= Latter Days (comics) =

2003 graphic novel by Dave Sim

- Cerebus #300; Latter Days #35 final issue of Cerebus
- Series: Cerebus
- Page count: 700 pages
- Publisher: Aardvark-Vanaheim

Creative team
- Writers: Dave Sim
- Artists: Dave Sim; Gerhard

Original publication
- Published in: Cerebus
- Issues: 266–300
- Language: English
- ISBN: 978-0-919-35922-2 (Latter Days); 978-0-919-35921-5 (The Last Day)

Chronology
- Preceded by: Going Home (2000 and 2001)

Latter Days is the tenth and final novel in Canadian cartoonist Dave Sim's Cerebus comic book series. It is made up of issues #266-300 of Cerebus. It was collected as the 15th and 16th "phonebook" volumes, as Latter Days (#266-288, November 2003) and The Last Day (#289-300, June 2004).

The novel concludes Cerebus' life, as Sim had long announced it would, and is generally considered the most difficult and problematic of the Cerebus novels.

Narrated by Cerebus from sometime later in his life, Latter Days is heavy in religious themes, and also features caricatures of the Three Stooges and Woody Allen.

== Background ==
Sim had declared early on that Cerebus would chronicle the life leading up to death of its titular character. The Judge at the end of Church & State had foretold that Cerebus would "die alone, unmourned and unloved". The main Cerebus story came to an end with issue #200; the final 100 issues served as a dénouement, with Latter Days an "epilogue-to-the-epilogue".

At the end of Going Home, Cerebus comes to reject Jaka, the woman he has loved almost since the beginning of the series and with whom he has been travelling to his childhood home.

== Synopsis ==
=== Prologue ===
(Cerebus #266–267)

Thirty years following Going Home, Cerebus, working as a shepherd, is only waiting to die.

=== Latter Days ===
(Cerebus #268–288)

Cerebus returns from the north with the intention of provoking the Cirinists into killing him when he is abducted by radical followers of the religion Rick founded in Rick's Story—they turn out to be a trio of caricatures of the Three Stooges called the Three Wise Fellows. With these followers behind him as an army, Cerebus leads a successful rebellion against the Cirinsts and conquers the continent of Estarcion, setting up a fascist utopia, from which he retires and starts obsessively collecting a Reads called "Rabbi", becoming an expert on the series and setting out to write "The. One. Definite. Guide to Rabbi."

He meets Konigsberg, the Not-So-Good Samaritan (a caricature of Jewish filmmaker Woody Allen), to whom Cerebus gives his unique interpretation of the Old Testament, in a mostly textual series called "Chasing YHWH" in issues #282-290. Cerebus explains that YHWH (which he pronounces "Yoowhoo") is a female deity who believes she is God.

=== The Last Day ===
(Cerebus #289–300)

A hundred years pass, and Cerebus awakens from a dream or vision in which cosmology is seen as a reflection of theology, complete with explanatory footnotes by Sim. Upon waking, Cerebus—now incredibly aged, decrepit, pain-ridden, and mildly senile, makes the laborious trek to his writing desk to write down his new revelation. He then hides the manuscript, and it is implied that nobody will find it for two thousand years, and he has written instructions on how to carry on his dynasty in a final testament for his son.

Cerebus spends most of the rest of the book trying to persuade his chief of security, Walter O'Reilly (named after Corporal Walter (Radar) O'Reilly from M*A*S*H) to admit his son, Shep-Shep, with whom he remembers sharing an idyllic father-son relationship. The Sanctuary is under lockdown due to opposition from a new and even more rabidly "feminist-homosexualist" group led by Shep-Shep's mother, however, whom Cerebus refers to as "New Joanne". The group favors such "rights" as pedophilia, zoophilia, juvenile recreational drug use and lesbian motherhood, as the result of which social values have undergone a complete breakdown.

Cerebus finally goes to bed despairing of seeing his son again, but Shep-Shep manages to sneak into Cerebus' room late that night. Their subsequent conversation shatters Cerebus' last illusions about his son. Shep-Shep has aligned himself with his mother, who has been conducting genetic engineering experiments, partly with knowledge gained from Cirin's earlier experimentation. Cerebus is disgusted and horrified when Shep-Shep shows him the results of one of the experiments; a baby sphinx made with his DNA. As he leaves, Shep-Shep reveals that he and his mother plan on creating a new religion around the sphinx. He also informs his father of a second new religion that has sprung up, Islam, and implies that Cerebus and his state will one day fall at the hands of Muslim invaders who see Cerebus's views on religion as blasphemy.

After Shep-Shep leaves, a rejuvenated Cerebus grabs a knife, intending to kill him and his followers, but falls out of bed and breaks his neck, alone, unmourned, and unloved, just as the Judge had predicted. His life passes before his eyes in a series of flashback panels and his ghost sees many of his old friends and enemies waiting for him in "the Light." Jaka, Bear, and Ham beckon to him and he eagerly rushes to join them, thinking they are in Heaven, but he then notices Rick's absence and realizes that the Light may in fact be Hell. He calls out to God for help, but is dragged into the Light nonetheless.

In 2017, Sim published a new five part series with Cerebus entitled Cerebus in Hell, with issues #0 and #1 through #4. This series reveals that the Light is indeed Hell. Cerebus is shown wandering around Hell with the artwork taken from Gustave Doré's illustrations for Dante Alighieri's Divine Comedy.

== Characters ==
Cerebus
The Three Wise Fellows
Caricatures of the Three Stooges; Koshie (Curly), Loshie (Larry) and Moshie (Moe). Radical followers of the religion Rick has started, they kidnap Cerebus in the hopes of receiving some sort of revelation from him.
Konigsberg
Caricature of Woody Allen (whose birth name is Allan Konigsberg), to whom Cerebus gives his interpretation of the Torah.
New Joanne
The female journalist interviewing Cerebus in the first parts of the novel, who bears a striking resemblance to Jaka. After the interview, she and Cerebus get married and have a son. Later, she becomes the leader of a "feminist-homosexualist" group, opposed to Cerebus' rule, that is causing social breakdown.
Shep-Shep
The son of Cerebus and New Joanne.
Walter O'Reilly
Chief of security. A caricature of Corporal Walter (Radar) O'Reilly from M*A*S*H.

== Publication ==
The novel took up the last 35 issues of Cerebus, from #266 through #300. It was published in two "phonebook" volumes: Latter Days in November 2003, collecting issues #266–288, and The Last Day in June 2004, collecting issues #289–300. The volume The Last Day includes a two-page introduction and 18 pages of annotations. The Last Day first printing in limited edition signed (by both Dave Sim and Gerhard) and numbered (out of 1000) ISBN 0-919359-21-3.

Gerhard had become frustrated with the time restraints on the work at this point, and has said publicly that Sim had lost him as a reader.

== Reception ==
Sim and Gerhard's continuing artistic innovations met with some praise, but the Three Stooges caricatures (and their tangential back-story) left some readers cold, as did Cerebus' take on the Scriptures. The fact that it was so text heavy (approximately a third of the book in small fonts) was also considered tiresome.
