= Mothers and Daughters (comics) =

Comic book series novel by Dave Sim

Mothers & Daughters
- Cover to Cerebus #155, the fifth issue of the Mothers & Daughters storyline
- Series: Cerebus
- Publisher: Aardvark-Vanaheim

Creative team
- Creators: Dave Sim; Gerhard

Original publication
- Published in: Cerebus
- Issues: 151–200
- Language: English

Chronology
- Preceded by: Melmoth (1991)
- Followed by: Guys (1997)

Mothers & Daughters: a novel is the sixth novel in Canadian cartoonist Dave Sim's Cerebus comic book series. Sim considers the novel to be the final portion of the main story. It collects Cerebus #151–200 in four volumes, the seventh through tenth volumes of the paperback "phone book" collections of the series, titled Flight, Women, Reads and Minds.

After two quiet, character-focused novels (Jaka's Story and Melmoth) in which the character Cerebus took a supporting role, Cerebus springs into action and takes centre stage in the series again. The novel is filled with climactic happenings, including the revelation of the identity of Suenteus Po, a sword battle between Cirin and Cerebus, and Cerebus having a long conversation with his creator—Sim himself.

Of particular note are the text portions that made up a large part of the third book of the novel, Reads, and especially what was the last issue making up that book—issue #186, in which Sim speaks to the reader in the first person about his ideas on gender. His writing in that issue about the "Male Light" and the "Female Void" have earned Sim a reputation as a misogynist and lost him numerous readers.

== Background ==
Cerebus, who had twice been Prime Minister of the city-state of Iest (first in High Society) and then all-powerful Pope, had fallen from grace at the end of Church & State. The fascist, matriarchal Cirinists invaded Iest, and Cerebus went into hiding, first with Jaka (the love of his life) and her husband.

After Jaka is captured by the Cirinists for illegal exotic dancing, Cerebus believes she has been put to death. He takes Jaka's doll, Missy, with him and finds a café at which to spend the rest of his life, paying for it with a rare gold coin, whose value has risen as the Cirinists have collected all the gold in the city.

Cerebus comes out of the near-catatonic state in which he had spent the duration of Melmoth when he hears of Jaka's ill-treatment at the hands of the Cirinists. He becomes enraged and starts attacking Cirinists with his sword, clutching Missy to himself.

== Books ==
Sim considers Mothers & Daughters to be one novel, but divided it into four books, as indicated in the indicia of each issue. The four books were collected into paperback "phonebook" volumes separately.

=== Book One: Flight ===
(Cerebus #151–162)

Cerebus's return from hiding and slaughter of Cirinsts leads to a very brief revolution. When word reaches Cirin, who is busily having books burned, she dispatches her army and has the rebellion brutally crushed, but before they can capture Cerebus, he disappears.

Artemis, with Elrod as his sidekick, also stages his own impromptu revolution under his new persona "PunisherRoach", a parody of the Marvel comics character The Punisher, armed with pearl-handled semi-automatic crossbows. Punisherroach plows through the Cirinists before Elrod leads him to a brothel, where he falls for a prostitute named Blossom, which calms him down somewhat.

Mrs. Thatcher and Mrs. Kopp (a parody of former Canadian Member of Parliament Sheila Copps) each try to take control of Cirinist power. Cirin works to manage her sect and arrange her own Ascension, while obsessing over Astoria and her connection with Cerebus.

Cerebus ascends into the Seventh Sphere and finally up to the Eighth Sphere where he speaks with Suenteus Po—who, he discovers, is the mysterious third aardvark. Po warns Cerebus not believe what George (the Judge from Church & State) has told him, as he is not reliable.

=== Book Two: Women ===
(Cerebus #163–174)

Cerebus crashes back to Earth. He is assisted by a mysterious old woman who is being openly spied upon by the Cirinists; she sends him to a bar to hide. This story arc includes a parody of Neil Gaiman's Sandman in which the Roach plays "Swoon" (a parody of Dream) and Elrod plays "Snuff" (a transgender parody of Death). Astoria and Cirin symbolically duel in a dream realm. The book includes excerpts from books written by Astoria and Cirin that describe their differing beliefs. Cerebus flies across the city to slay Astoria, but is interrupted by the arrival of Suenteus Po.

=== Book Three: Reads ===
(Cerebus #175–186)

This book primarily consists of two long text pieces. These two stories are accompanied by a long discussion between Cirin, Astoria, Cerebus, and Suenteus Po. Po gives information about aardvarks, including that all aardvarks have Cerebus' "magnifier" quality, and attempts to convince each of the others to abandon their pursuits of power and return to what they enjoy doing most, then leaves them to their fates. Astoria is convinced and also leaves, but not before giving Cerebus information about her history with Cirin and also informing him of his hermaphrodite nature. Cerebus and Cirin then engage in a long and brutal sword fight, which leads to the beginning of another Ascension.

The first revolves around an author of Reads, which are heavily illustrated books that are popular in Cerebus' world. In this story, there is a strong thread about the dangers of commercial success and "selling out". The series moves from this storyline to a long essay attributed to Viktor Davis, a fictional Reads author. This essay puts forth a theory on the nature of the genders, describing the "Female Void" focused on feeling, and the "Male Light" focused on reason and that "feelings" (the void) seeks the utter annihilation of "reason" (the light). It is in the conclusion to this book that Sim produced issue #186, which earned him the reputation of being a misogynist.

=== Book Four: Minds ===
(Cerebus #187–200)

Cerebus and Cirin ascend, then are separated by a mysterious force. As Cerebus flies through the Solar System, he is shown images from his past and is forced to reconsider his actions and his faith. He then encounters a disembodied voice calling itself "Dave" that acknowledges itself as Cerebus's creator. "Dave" shows Cerebus the history of the Cirinist movement, revealing that Cirin is actually named Serna and was the best friend of the real Cirin (the old woman Cerebus encountered in Women), but usurped Cirin's leadership and effectively exchanged identities with her. "Dave" then gives Cerebus information about his past, showing that Cerebus unwittingly ruined his original destiny, causing chaotic repercussions which have influenced most of his adventures. Cerebus demands that "Dave" make Jaka love him; in response, "Dave" shows Cerebus visions of possible futures between himself and Jaka, all of which are disastrously flawed for both of them due to Cerebus' nature. After a period of penance and self-reflection on Pluto, Cerebus asks "Dave" to place him in a bar he remembers from his mercenary days.

== Issue 186 ==
Cerebus #186 was published in September 1994. The issue is the final portion of the Reads collection in the Mothers & Daughters story. It went on to become one of the most notoriously controversial books in comics history.

Sim speaks directly to the reader through a fictional version of himself, Viktor Davis. Sim had long been critical of modern feminism. The text from this particular issue speaks directly about real-world events (rather than the Cerebus story-line) and involvement of men versus women. 'Viktor' offers that many modern problems are worsening by the influence of women, specifically their alleged tendency to take important decisions based on emotions rather than intellectual reasoning. He describes gender roles and male-female relationships with visceral metaphor to the effect that the "Female Void devours the Male Light," and suggests that most men in long-term relationships with women are treated little better than "housepets".

According to Sim, Cerebus issue #186 was "one of the few Cerebus back issues to sell out virtually overnight", and word of its content made headlines in the comics community. The reaction was generally a combination of shock and outrage, followed by sharp decline in readership. Once known as a pioneer for independent comics, word of his essay brought Dave Sim a reputation as a misogynist.

== Characters ==
Cerebus
After spending two novels in a secondary role, and spending an entire novel in a near-catatonic state, Cerebus leaps into action and takes centre stage once again. He finally meets the mysterious third aardvark, who turns out to be Suenteus Po. It is also revealed that Cerebus is a hermaphrodite.
Cirin
Leader of the matriarchal Cirinists who have conquered the city of Iest—also, along with Cerebus, one of only three aardvarks known to exist in Estarcion. She is working to bring about another Ascension, and having a giant gold sphere made in preparation. Cerebus and Cirin have a dramatic sword fight during the course of Reads. It is later revealed that she is not the real Cirin however—her real name is Serna, and she has usurped power from the real Cirin, a human woman, now old.
Suenteus Po
After appearing only as a voice in Cerebus' head for most of the series, it is finally revealed that he is the third Aardvark.
Astoria
Cirin's greatest matriarchal rival.
The Roach
Once again taking on parodic roles, first as the "Punisheroach" (after the Marvel character, The Punisher), and then as "Swoon" (after Neil Gaiman's take on the Vertigo character, Dream, from The Sandman).
Elrod
The Roach's sidekick again, Elrod takes on the persona of "Snuff" (a transvestite parody of the Sandman character, Death).

== Publication ==
Mothers & Daughters "phonebook" collections
Volume Title	Published	Issues	Dates	ISBN
Flight	March 1993	151–162	1991–1992	0-919359-13-2
Women	April 1994	163–174	1992–1993	0-919359-14-0
Reads	April 1995	175–186	1993–1994	0-919359-15-9
Minds	June 1996	187–200	1994–1995	0-919359-16-7

Originally serialized in Cerebus #151-200, Mothers & Daughters was conceived as one novel, but was collected into four paperback "phonebook" volumes. As in Jaka's Story and Melmoth previously, and as in all the Cerebus stories to follow, the issues displayed the current issue number of the Cerebus comic, as well as the current number of the Mothers & Daughters storyline, so that issue #155 of Cerebus was also indicated to be installment #5 of Mothers & Daughters. The four books of Mothers & Daughters, however, were not indicated by name or installment number on the cover. All first printings were limited editions signed (by both Dave Sim and Gerhard) and numbered on the inside title page; Flight numbered out of 5000, Women and Reads numbered out of 3500, and Minds numbered out of 2100.

The Cerebus "phonebook" volumes had text-free spines until the publication of Flight. Afterwards, all volumes (and reprintings of the earlier volumes) had text on their spines, including the title and volume number.

== See also ==
- Alternative comics
- Graphic novel
