= Going Home (comics) =

2000 graphic novel by Dave Sim

- Cover to Cerebus #232, the first installment of Going Home photograph by Gerhard
- Series: Cerebus
- Page count: 686 pages
- Publisher: Aardvark-Vanaheim

Creative team
- Writers: Dave Sim
- Artists: Dave Sim; Gerhard

Original publication
- Published in: Cerebus
- Issues: 232–265
- Date of publication: July 1998 – April 2001
- Language: English
- ISBN: 978-0-919-35919-2 (Going Home); 978-0-919-35920-8 (Form & Void)

Chronology
- Preceded by: Rick's Story (1998)
- Followed by: Latter Days (2003 and 2004)

Going Home is the ninth novel in Canadian cartoonist Dave Sim's Cerebus comic book series. It is made up of issues #232–265 of Cerebus. It was collected as the 13th and 14th "phonebook" volumes, as Going Home (#232–250, March 2000) and Form & Void (#251–265, May 2001).

Cerebus has reunited with Jaka, and has agreed to travel with her to Sand Hills Creek, where he grew up. Along the way, they take a ride on a riverboat and meet F. Stop Kennedy, a caricature of F. Scott Fitzgerald; and later they meet Hamilton Earnestway (Ernest Hemingway) and his wife Mary.

== Background ==
Cerebus has spent two novels confined to a tavern. At the end of the previous book, Cerebus meets his creator (Sim), who leaves him a package—Jaka's doll, Missy. Jaka then appears, and the two are reunited and fall in love. Jaka's tries to convince Cerebus to go to Cerebus' childhood home, Sand Hills Creek, with her. He has to make a decision between his male friends in the tavern or Jaka. He eventually gives in to Jaka, and the two set off.

== Synopsis ==
Going Home was divided into three sections: "Sudden Moves", "Fall and the River", and "Form & Void". The first two were collected in the Going Home "phonebook" collection, while the third was collected separately as Form & Void.

=== Sudden Moves ===
(Cerebus #232–239)

Cerebus and Jaka are together and deeply in love. Having been reunited at the end of the previous volume, they set out toward Cerebus' childhood home of Sand Hills Creek. Jaka's aristocratic status affords them protection along the way—Cirinists (including a caricature of Janet Reno) travel ahead of the couple to each tavern to ensure a warm reception wherever they go. Each morning the pair go shopping for Jaka's outfits and move on by afternoon, never spending more than a day at any one location.

On their travels, they encounter pubs run by caricatures of real-world comics personalities such as Greg Hyland, Rick Veitch, and Alan Moore. Jaka insists on shopping and sightseeing at every stop, while Cerebus grows increasingly anxious—Sand Hills Creek lies on the other side of the Conniptin mountains, and he fears they will be caught by the first snowfall and stranded.

=== Fall and the River ===
(Cerebus #240–250)

Cerebus and Jaka board a riverboat to continue their journey. Onboard, they encounter F. Stop Kennedy, a caricature of F. Scott Fitzgerald. Sim uses this section to explore themes of literary legacy and artistic decline, drawing extensively on his research into Fitzgerald's life and work, some of which was later compiled as "Chasing Scott" in the collected Going Home volume. The riverboat setting allows for an extended character study between Cerebus and the Fitzgerald figure.

=== Form & Void ===
(Cerebus #251–265)

Cerebus and Jaka find a hunting lodge in which to spend the winter, and are surprised to discover that the famous writer Hamilton Earnestway—a thinly veiled parody of Ernest Hemingway—and his wife Mary are also lodging there. Cerebus, a devoted fan of Earnestway's work, is starstruck by the encounter. However, Earnestway is in his twilight years, suffering from deep depression and crippling writer's block. Cerebus is initially oblivious to Ham's deteriorating state, but gradually recognises how withdrawn and diminished the once-great writer has become.

Sim uses the visual language of comics to convey Earnestway's decline: the character's speech balloons are rendered shaky and small, while those of his boisterous wife Mary are bold and expansive—a technique that illustrates his psychological collapse without the need for explicit narration. The section draws heavily on Sim's research into Hemingway's life, particularly his final years, and serves as a meditation on creativity, masculinity, and artistic failure.

== Publication ==
Going Home "phonebook" collections
Volume Title	Pages	Published	Issues	Dates	ISBN
Going Home	386	March 2000	#232–250	July 1998 – September 1999	978-0-919-35919-2
Form & Void	300	May 2001	#251–265	October 1999 – April 2001	978-0-919-35920-8

Going Home was published in Cerebus issues #232 (July 1998) to #265 (April 2001) and collected in two volumes: Going Home in March 2000, collecting Cerebus #232–250; and Form & Void in May 2001, collecting Cerebus #251–265. Going Home first printing in limited signed (by both Dave Sim and Gerhard) and numbered (out of 1000) March 2000, ISBN 0-919-359-19-1. Form & Void first printing in limited signed (by both Dave Sim and Gerhard) and numbered (out of 1000) May 2001, ISBN 0-919-359-20-5.

All the covers—including those of the collections—were done with full-colour photographs taken by Gerhard. When serialized, Sim included copious amounts of notes on the background research he did into F. Scott Fitzgerald which was included as "Chasing Scott" in the Going Home volume.
