= Rick's Story =

- Cover to the Rick's Story collection (Aardvark-Vanaheim, 1998)
- Series: Cerebus
- Page count: 246 pages
- Publisher: Aardvark-Vanaheim

Creative team
- Writers: Dave Sim
- Artists: Dave Sim; Gerhard

Original publication
- Published in: Cerebus
- Issues: 220–231
- Language: English
- ISBN: 978-0-919-35918-5

Chronology
- Preceded by: Guys (1997)
- Followed by: Going Home (2000 and 2001)

Rick's Story is the eighth novel in Canadian cartoonist Dave Sim's Cerebus comic book series. It is made up of issues #220-231 of Cerebus. It was collected as Rick's Story in one volume in November 1998, and was the 12th collected "phonebook" volume.

Rick, Jaka's ex-husband from Jaka's Story, unexpectedly shows up in the tavern that Cerebus has inhabited for the duration of Guys. Rick is writing a book about his relationship with Jaka. He looks up to Cerebus and constantly pesters him for advice. Cerebus feels like his babysitter and constantly tries to get Rick to leave, even try to get him married off to Joanne from Minds, who has also shown up. Rick has descended into religious madness, and starts telling the story of Cerebus as an angel/demon in faux-King James Bible-style English.

== Synopsis ==
Picking up where Guys left off, Cerebus is confronted with a strangely familiar face. When he can't quite figure out who this character is, he's given a hint: "You once told me that you were in love with my wife."

Rick is writing a book, entitled Rick's Story, about his breakup with Jaka. He was monogamous by nature, and it irrevocably changed him when his marriage with Jaka collapsed at the end of Jaka's Story. He has become an alcoholic, and the story he tells Cerebus of his life since last they met is convoluted and contradictory. He breaks down crying after being hit with a ball when playing Five Bar Gate. Cerebus resents becoming Rick's babysitter and desperately tries to get Rick to suck it up, be a man and get on with life, telling him to "Go on! Beat It! Scram!" which for Rick takes on the character of religious teaching. Following this, Rick begins a Cerebus-centred religion, in which Cerebus represents both god and the devil.

Rick reads out his version of the "Books of Genesis" in a style reminiscent of the King James Version of the Bible. He eventually descends into religious insanity, eventually leading to gory, drunken self-flagellation resulting in mortification.

Rick starts going out with Joanne, and Cerebus tries to convince him to leave with her. Eventually Rick leaves, but not before placing a spell on him and telling him to "go to hell", as Cerebus had told Joanne. He tells Cerebus they will see each other only one more time after that day.

Sim himself appears in the pub and talks with Cerebus, but Cerebus doesn't recognize who he is. Sim leaves Cerebus a package, which turns out to be Jaka's doll, Missy. Finally, Jaka arrives on the scene and tries to convince Cerebus to go with her to Sand Hills Creek, where Cerebus grew up. Cerebus must decide between Jaka and his male companions in the tavern. He decides on going with Jaka.

== Publication ==
The story was collected in a single 246-page volume as Rick's Story in November 1998 after being serialized in issues #220-231 of Cerebus. It was the 12th "phonebook" volume. The first printing was a limited signed (by both Dave Sim and Gerhard) and numbered (out of 1000) edition. ISBN 0-919359-18-3 for that printing.

The covers of the issues displayed the current Rick's Story installment number on a bar-sign graphic which, after a turning point in the story, began to grow and engulf the cover, leaving a small bar-sign-shaped area for the actual cover drawing that shrunk every issue.

== Reception ==
The book had little impact, and despite some memorable dialogue, one reader called it "the most forgettable of all the books so far", and found the faux-King James passages to be impenetrable, although at Jazz Bastards it was said to be "a chapter in the story of Cerebus that deserves a place with other respected graphic novels."
