= Melmoth (comics) =

Fifth novel in Dave Sim's Cerebus comic book series

- Cover to the Melmoth collection (Aardvark-Vanaheim, 1991)
- No. of issues: 11
- Series: Cerebus
- Publisher: Aardvark-Vanaheim

Creative team
- Creators: Dave Sim; Gerhard

Original publication
- Published in: Cerebus
- Issues: 139–150
- Language: English
- ISBN: 0-919359-10-8

Chronology
- Preceded by: Jaka's Story (1990)
- Followed by: Mothers & Daughters (1993, 1994, 1995, and 1996)

Melmoth is the fifth novel in Canadian cartoonist Dave Sim's Cerebus comic book series. It follows Oscar (a caricature of Oscar Wilde) in his last days leading up until his death, while Cerebus sits catatonic, clutching the doll of Jaka, the woman he loves but believes has been killed.

The novel was collected as the sixth paperback "phonebook" collection in the series in October 1991.

== Synopsis ==
After Jaka, Rick and Oscar's arrest (and Pud's death), Cerebus returns to the Lower City, where he uses a gold coin to buy room and board at Dino's for the rest of his life. There he sits near-comatose for most of the rest of the story, gripping Jaka's doll Missy.

Oscar has become ill.

== Characters ==
Oscar
After being released from prison, Oscar (like the real Oscar Wilde) assumes the name Sebastian Melmoth. Terminally ill, he spends his remaining days in a hotel, receiving visits from his doctor and close friends.
It is not clear that this Oscar is the same Oscar from Jaka's Story—Sim was ambiguous "with a capital 'A'" as to whether they were the same person, and the Oscar of Melmoth referred to the Oscar who was the author of Jaka's Story in the third person.
Cerebus
After seeing the destruction of Jaka's home, he has become near-catatonic. He uses the gold coin he found to pay for room and board at Dino's for the rest of his life, where he sits quietly and vacantly with Jaka's doll, Missy.
Dino
The owner of the café where Cerebus has chosen to spend the rest of his life.
Doris
Janice
Reggie
Close friend of Oscar.
Robbie Ross
Close friend of Oscar.
Dr. Tucker
Oscar's doctor.

There were also brief appearances by numerous characters from the series, including the Roach, Mick & Keef, Posey and others.

== Artwork ==
At this point, according to Gerhard, Sim and Gerhard had "an unspoken understanding" when it came the backgrounds—Sim would occasionally make suggestions (such as the white fog that surrounded Cerebus at times to reflect his emotional state), but for the most part Gerhard was left to decide on how to handle the backgrounds himself. The building designs were based on what Gerhard could find in library architecture books. He couldn't find anything specific about the doctor's office or Wilde's final resting place, aside from Wilde's "famous last line" ("My wallpaper and I are fighting a duel to the death. One or the other of us has to go.") indicating that the "wallpaper had to be really ugly." He drew inspiration from Barry Windsor Smith for the series covers.

== Publication ==
The story was originally serialized in Cerebus #139–150. The issues were further numbered Melmoth Zero (Cerebus #139, October 1990) through Melmoth Eleven (Cerebus #150, September 1991), although this numbering is not acknowledged in the collection.

The collection appeared in October 1991. It included an 11-page text section with reproductions of letters from The Collected Letters of Oscar Wilde that Sim used as the basis for the Wilde portions of the story, showing the changes he made to make them fit into the fictional world of Estarcion, plus annotations. The first printing, October 1991, was a signed (by both Dave Sim and Gerhard) and numbered (out of 410) by hand on the inside title page. No volume number was printed on the spine until later printings.

== Sim's sources ==
- Hart-Davis, Rupert. Collected Letters of Oscar Wilde. (1962)
