= Guys (comics) =

- Cover to the Guys collection (Aardvark-Vanaheim, 1997)
- Series: Cerebus
- Page count: 408 pages
- Publisher: Aardvark-Vanaheim

Creative team
- Creators: Dave Sim; Gerhard

Original publication
- Published in: Cerebus
- Issues: 201–219
- Language: English
- ISBN: 978-0-919-35917-8

Chronology
- Preceded by: Mothers and Daughters (1993, 1994, 1995, and 1996)
- Followed by: Rick's Story (1998)

Guys is the seventh novel in Canadian cartoon artist Dave Sim's Cerebus comic book series. It is made up of issues #201-219 of Cerebus and was collected as Guys in one volume in September 1997.

The book marks a return to a lighter and more humorous style, and takes place in a males-only bar.

== Synopsis ==
After being shown the truth about the universe and himself, Cerebus is given the opportunity to choose to be anywhere he wants. He chooses a bar. The tavern he is placed in is located by the Wall of T'si, with a host of Cerebus regulars, including Bear, Boobah and Mick & Keef; visits from the Margaret Thatcher caricature from Jaka's Story; and new characters, such as bartenders Richard George and Harrison Starkey (based on members of the Beatles), and caricatures of Norman Mailer and Marty Feldman's Igor from the film Young Frankenstein.

Much of the story revolves around Cerebus' relation to Bear, who is seen as having achieved a certain level of manhood and contentment. Cerebus, in contrast, is selfish, childish and controlling. Cerebus is unable to connect with others, and gradually alienates those around him with his drunken, selfish behaviour.

== Publication ==
Sim says that the actual Cerebus story finished with issue #200, and that following would be 100 issues of dénouement. The first printing was a limited edition signed (by both Dave Sim and Gerhard) and numbered (out of 1500) on the inside title page.

== Sources ==
- Cerebus Fangirl
- Cerebus Wiki, set up by Cerebus Fangirl
