= Jaka's Story =

- Cover to the Jaka's Story collection (Aardvark-Vanaheim, 1990)
- Date: 1990
- Series: Cerebus
- Page count: 486 pages
- Publisher: Aardvark-Vanaheim

Creative team
- Writer: Dave Sim
- Artists: Dave Sim; Gerhard

Original publication
- Published in: Cerebus
- Issues: 114–136, 138

Chronology
- Preceded by: Church & State (1987 and 1988)
- Followed by: Melmoth (1991)

Jaka's Story is the fourth major storyline in Canadian cartoonist Dave Sim's Cerebus comics series.

Originally published in Cerebus #114-136, the storyline continues in the wake of the events of "Church and State" and the conquest of the city of Iest by the fascist matriarchal Cirinists. The story focuses on Cerebus, his longtime love interest Jaka, Jaka's husband Rick, Oscar (a stand-in for the real life Oscar Wilde), and Jaka's employer Pud (a tavern owner) as they struggle against the repressive fascist regime of the Cirinists. In particular, the free spirited Jaka defies the Cirinist ban on dancing, which leads to ruin for Rick, Jaka, and Cerebus.

The book flashes back and forth between Jaka's lonely, aristocratic childhood up to her twelfth birthday, and the "present" time of the main Cerebus storyline. The "present" sections are told in comics form while the "past" portions are told in flowery prose sections, which the reader finds out later are written by Oscar (and are in Sim's imitation of Wilde's writing style), unknown to Jaka and based on what Oscar has heard from Rick.

== Overview ==
The story alternates between "the present" in regular comics pages (mostly done in a six-panel grid) and "the past" in illustrated text passages. Cerebus' character remains mostly in the background, and doesn't even appear in most of the second half of the book.

The overblown prose of the text passages, the reader discovers later, were written by Jaka and Rick's artistic neighbour Oscar (a caricature of Oscar Wilde). It tells the tale of Jaka's childhood and aristocratic origins as she is brought up in her uncle Lord Julius' household with an overbearing Nurse, as interpreted by Oscar from stories he has heard from Rick. Nurse's face is never seen—often it is replaced with the face of Jaka's doll, Missy).

The story is told with a limited number of people and locations, creating a confined, claustrophobic feeling. Much of the novel is spent developing the characters, and Cerebus himself takes a back-seat role.

== Synopsis ==
=== Prologue ===
(Cerebus #114)

Jaka goes about her morning, waking her husband Rick and preparing the bath and his breakfast, and irritatedly prodding him to go find work in the Lower City.

Parallel to this, in the prose sections, we see Jaka as a lonely child, also going about her morning, being watched over by her imposing Nurse. Her only friend was her doll, Missy. Together, they are taken to visit a park in which she plays on a wooden horse called Thunder, but which in her imagination is called Magic. The reader finds out that Missy is still with Jaka in the "present", sitting on her shelf, watching over her, as if protecting her.

=== Book One: Pogrom's Progress ===
(Cerebus #115–119)

Cerebus, on his way down towards the Lower City, comes across a tavern run by Pud Withers. Cerebus tries to order an ale, but Pud panics when Cerebus tries to pay with a gold coin—certain indenture laws have sent the price of gold "through the roof". Jaka walks in and, seeing that Cerebus is still alive, she embraces him and invites him to stay at her home. Cerebus learns that Jaka has had a miscarriage, and meets Rick. After staying for some time, Cerebus announces to Jaka that he will not leave without her. Rick overhears the conversation between Jaka and Cerebus and realizes that their guest had formerly been the Pope. Cerebus stays, witnessing Jaka and Rick's fights and make-up love-makings through the walls.

Jaka works for Pud as a dancer in the evenings, though she feels "useless" that she has drawn no customers. She also seem unaware of Pud's lusting for her—he plays out fantasy conversations with her in his mind—or the fact that he's ruining himself financially over her.

During the text sections, we follow Jaka's lonely childhood, as she hits her head on Magic and is left bedridden; and as she finds a hidden room in the house.

=== Book Two: The Poet ===
(Cerebus #120–130)

Oscar, Jaka and Rick's next-door neighbour (and a caricature of Oscar Wilde) return from the Upper City. Rick is enamoured of Oscar, who is vain, rude and arrogant. Rick tells Oscar that he wants to have a son, and that he will give his son a foal when he turns 10. He'll have his son lift it over his head every day until he turns 13, at which point he'll be able to lift a full-grown horse, and not be skinny and weak like Rick himself. Rick accidentally lets Oscar know of their houseguest, before quickly remembering that Cerebus had been the Pope and was in hiding. He covers up by calling Cerebus "Fred" and claiming he is Jaka's brother.

Jaka and Pud both dislike Oscar. Pud makes no effort to disguise his dislike; however, as landlord, must allow him to stay, as his dead mother had given Oscar a 90-year lease on his house.

Jaka returns home excitedly one night after having her first customer at Pud's tavern, an old veteran. The news is stifled by Rick and "Fred", who are in the middle of a game, and Jaka goes to her room in tears. Rick follows, and the two fight, partly over Rick's insistence that he will go to the Lower City to fetch paint for Oscar. "Fred" overhears, and in the morning leaves a note saying that he will go to the Lower City for the paint.

Oscar lets Rick know that he has completed a book—the very book that the reader has been reading between the comics. Oscar lets Jaka know through Rick, and has himself invited to see Jaka dance. Jaka's curiosity is piqued and she consents. She dances for Oscar, Rick, Pud and the veteran. Oscar then excuses himself to get the manuscript of the book, and while he is gone, Rick lets her know that it is about her childhood. Jaka is mortified—she can't believe Rick would tell such private things to Oscar.

Before Oscar can return, the tavern is discovered and invaded by Cirinists. Exotic dancing is illegal in Cirinist-run Iest, and Jaka is arrested. Pud and the veteran are killed. Oscar returns, but assures the Cirinsts that he was not a patron. They arrest him, instead, for writing a book without having an "artistic license", and sentence him to two years hard labour.

=== Book Three: Mystery Achievement ===
(Cerebus #131–136)

Jaka is imprisoned by the Cirinists for the felony of being an exotic dancer. In the prison, she finds out that her neighbour in the next cell is Nurse, who is to be executed for lacking the proper immigration papers. Jaka is treated harshly by the prison guard, and is led to believe that Rick is dead.

We are introduced to Mrs. Thatcher, a caricature of former British prime minister Margaret Thatcher, a matriarch who tries to show Jaka what exotic dancing "really was", as opposed to what Jaka believed it to be. She is allowed to return to Palnu on the condition that she sign an admission of wrongdoing. Under pressure, she signs, whereupon she is told that Rick is still alive and they are to be reunited. When they are brought together, however, Mrs. Thatcher reveals to Rick that the Cirinists knew that Jaka had had an abortion, not a miscarriage. Rick explodes and strikes Jaka. The two are allowed to separate, with Rick being returned to his mother, but not before having his left thumb broken for "striking a woman".

At the end, "Fred" returns with the paint, only to find the houses burnt out and the inhabitants gone.

=== Epilogue ===
(from second half of Cerebus #138)

Jaka spends her time in the suite in Palnu where she had spent her last year before running away. The servants gossip, while Jaka, who barely eats or drinks, stares vacantly out a window.

== Characters ==
Jaka Nash (née Tavers)
Married to Rick and pregnant by him, Jaka is now dancing at Pud's tavern in exchange for just enough money to cover rent and groceries, which are provided by Pud. While she had been pregnant the last time she and Cerebus met, she tells Cerebus she has had a miscarriage. Later, it is revealed that she had actually had an illegal abortion.
In a 1994 interview (around the time the anti-feminist Cerebus #186 was published), Sim claimed he wrote Jaka as a nuanced, sympathetic character only as a "writing exercise", the point of which was to build her up in the readers' minds and then tear her down at the end of the story, although in the past Sim had written that Jaka was someone he would actually like to hang out with. Jaka was ranked 55th in Comics Buyer's Guide's "100 Sexiest Women in Comics" list.
Nurse
Jaka's governess in the prose sections of the book; stern and overbearing. Her real name is Ada Talbot.
Rick Nash
Jaka's unemployed husband; slack, immature but likeable. He desperately wants a son. He also enjoys hanging around with Oscar and helping him out, though Jaka considers Oscar a bad influence.
In the introduction to the Jaka's Story phonebook, Sim dispels the idea that Rick was based on himself. He goes on to say that Rick is most likely the closest Sim came to writing a character who is a truly good person.
Pud Withers
Store- and tavern-owner; Jaka and Rick's landlord; Jaka's employer at the tavern. He secretly pines after Jaka, but is too shy wo do anything about it. The reader is privy through inner monologue to the fantasy conversations he imagines having with Jaka.
Cerebus
Jaka and Rick's house guest, hiding from the Cirinists under the assumed name of "Fred"
Oscar
Caricature of Oscar Wilde; Jaka and Rick's next-door neighbour. A writer who is vain and arrogant aristophile. He was granted a 90-year lease on the house he lives in by Pud's dead mother. Pud himself, however, despises Oscar.
Mrs. Thatcher
A matriarch based on Margaret Thatcher, she tries to get Jaka to sign an admission of guilt for her exotic dancing, and tries, forcefully, to convince her why such dancing is wrong.

== Style ==
Preliminary floor plan and #d view designs done by Gerhard prior to starting the book

The pages of the "present" portions of the book were done in six panel grids, two tiers of three panels. This was done with little variation, although sometimes the shape of the panels was distorted, reflecting tensions occurring within the panels.

Mrs Thatcher's distinct melodramatic and rhythmic speech balloons

The characters were more realistic and less exhibited less caricatured exaggeration than in earlier Cerebus stories. The backgrounds were particularly realistic. As this was the first Cerebus "novel" that Gerhard participated in from the beginning, he had the luxury of being able to plan out the rooms of the houses ahead of time. They were based on Sim's memory, as described to Gerhard, of the apartment Sim and his then-wife Deni had first shared. (Note: Jaka's Story, page 9. "[Gerhard's] patience in reconstructing the apartment where I first lived with my ex-wife (it was demolished some years ago) from my descriptions of it was prodigious[...]") Gerhard spent about a month completing floor plans and 3D views of the buildings in the story before any pages were actually drawn, and Sim wrote the scenes of the story to suit these plans.

Of particular interest is Sim's award-winning, expressive use of lettering and speech balloons, especially the exaggerated rhythms and intonation used for Mrs. Thatcher's dialogue.

== Publication history ==
Instalment numbers of Jaka's Story were displayed prominently on the covers of Cerebus the Aardvark along with issue numbers

Originally published in issues #114–136 of Sim's monthly Cerebus series from August 1988 to July 1990, Jaka's Story was published as a trade paperback "phone book" collection in October 1990. Sim had briefly toyed with the idea of publishing expensive, high-quality, oversized editions of Jaka's Story, but soon decided against it for being too greedy. The first printing, October 1990, was limited to 435 signed (by both Dave Sim and Gerhard) and numbered copies (hand written on inside title page), ISBN 0-919359-12-4.

Jaka's Story was the first Cerebus novel to be conceived with the finished graphic novel collection in mind. When serialized, it prominently displayed the novel name (Jaka's Story) on the cover, and printed both the current issue of the series and the current issue of the novel—so, for example, the January 1989 issue was numbered both Cerebus #119 and Jaka's Story #6.

Sim says he was influenced by Love and Rockets to do a "more human" story.

The novel was sandwiched between two issues (the #112/113 double issue and #137) that have not been collected in the series of "phone book" collections. Issues #137 and #138 were subtitled "Jaka's Story Epilogue" 1 and 2 on their covers. The second half of issue #138 was included in the Jaka's Story collection as the epilogue, but the story that made up the rest of the two issues ("Like-a-Looks", see below) was not included in the Jaka's Story collection.

=== Like-a-Looks ===
In issue #137 and the first half of #138 ran the story "Like-a-Looks"—a light-hearted, comedic story about the numerous doppelgängers Lord Julius would hire to stand in his place when he needed a break. The story has never been included in any "phonebook" collection. It has, however, been included in Cerebus Number Zero, which collects all the stories from the regular Cerebus series that didn't appear in the phonebooks.

== Reception ==
=== Recognition ===
Jaka's Story has been said to be Sim's peak work and the best introduction to Cerebus (although others says High Society is the best introduction). In 1990, it was nominated for a Harvey Award for "Best Single Issue or Story". It was included in Stephen Weiner's book The 101 Best Graphic Novels in 2001.

== Reappraisal ==
Though for years, the series was considered by Sim as one of his proudest works, but in recent time Sims has spoken negatively of the work. In particular, Sim has stated that Jaka's actions in the story were selfish and that the unhappy ending was not a commentary on censorship and fascist behavior of totalitarian regimes, but a commentary on Jaka's selfish nature towards not caring that her dancing would lead to harm done to those around her.
