= Cerebus (comics) =

Comic series by Dave Sim

- Date: 1987
- No. of issues: 25
- Series: Cerebus
- Page count: 534 pages
- Publisher: Aardvark-Vanaheim

Creative team
- Creators: Dave Sim

Original publication
- Published in: Cerebus
- Issues: 1–25
- Date of publication: December 1977 – April 1981
- Language: English
- ISBN: 0-919359-08-6

Chronology
- Followed by: High Society (1986)

Cerebus is the first collected volume of Canadian cartoonist Dave Sim's Cerebus comic book series. It is made up of the first 25 issues of Cerebus, plus, as of the 11th edition, some strips that ran in Comics Buyer's Guide featuring Silverspoon, a parody of the comic strip Prince Valiant.

While Cerebus is the first volume in the series, it was the third to be collected in "phonebook" form, after High Society and Church & State Volume I.

== Synopsis ==
The first 13 issues have one-shot stories that, near the end, begin to blend into longer storylines. Many of the early issues are completely or partially homages to classic sword and sorcery stories and characters, particularly Conan and Elric. With Issue #14, 'The Walls of Palnu', Cerebus is introduced to Grandlord Julius (a parody of Groucho Marx), ruler of the city-state of Palnu. Lord Julius rewards Cerebus for rescuing his son, Lord Silverspoon, with a government job that he styles as 'Kitchen Staff Supervisor' but is really in charge of Lord Julius' private security detail.

During these first 25 issues, we are introduced to most of the major characters in the series going forward, as well as hints of the major political conflicts going on in the larger world.

== First appearances ==
Cerebus
Bran Mak Muffin
Jaka
Red Sophia
Elrod the Albino (or Elrod of Melvinbone)
The Roach
Lord Julius

== Publication ==
Cerebus (though only the collected volume is so titled) comprises the first 25 issues of the Cerebus comic book series. Unlike the other volumes, Cerebus is not a cohesive story, but rather, most represented issues contain their own story, with certain stories lasting two or three issues.

For the first dozen issues, the comic book was published bi-monthly. When Sim's partner and wife-to-be, Deni Loubert, realized that the comic book was selling well enough to go monthly, Sim dropped his commercial art work and focused on Cerebus.

Though the first in the series, Cerebus was the third volume to be printed after High Society came out in 1986 and Church & State Volume I came out in 1987. Cerebus left the presses on August 15, 1987.

The 11th and later editions contain extra pages—the "Silverspoon" storyline from the Comics Buyer's Guide that took place between Cerebus #13 and #14. It was placed in the middle of the Cerebus "phonebook" starting on page 295. Sim said its appearance in the phonebook was important, otherwise the sudden appearance of Lord Julius is inexplicable; that the story had not been included before was an oversight.

== Sources ==
- Cerebus Fangirl
- Cerebus Wiki, set up by Cerebus Fangirl
