= Cerebus phonebook =

Paperback collections

Cerebus phonebooks are the paperback collections in which Dave Sim has collected his comic book series Cerebus since 1986. They have come to be known as "phonebooks" as their thickness and paper stock resemble that of telephone directories. The format had a large influence on alternative comics publishing and was key in the move from the periodical-centric publishing style that was once dominant.

== History ==
=== Swords of Cerebus ===
Starting in 1981, Sim started collecting the Cerebus stories in Swords of Cerebus. Swords collected four issues per volume, each with a backup story and new cover.

Swords of Cerebus volumes
#	Issues	Date	Backup	Notes
1	1-4	January 1981	"The Name of the Game is Diamondback"	
2	5-8	June 1981	"Demonhorn" "The Morning After"	
3	9-12	Fall 1981	"What Happened Between Issues Twenty & Twenty-One."	
4	13-16	Fall 1982	"Magiking" "Silverspoon"	
5	17-20	Fall 1983	"Cerebus Dreams" by Barry Windsor-Smith	Front and back covers by Barry Windsor-Smith
1	21-24 (1st); 21-25	Fall 1984	"A Night on the Town"	First printing did not reprint issue #25, so a supplemental issue was printed of #25

=== High Society ===
High Society had been conceived as one complete story, but Sim had not originally planned for it to be published as one volume. He did so more as an expedient:

I have arrived at this decision for a number of reasons (a) the difficulty involved in keeping each volume of Cerebus in print at all times, (b) the convenience of being able to introduce new fans to Cerebus with two large volumes and (at most) two dozen back issues, (c) a manageable format for someday having all 300 issues available, (d) the opportunity to expand Cerebus' exposure by making it available in bookstores.

— Dave Sim

Sim published it as one 512-page trade paperback volume in 1986. It was offered exclusively through mail order and sold out its 6000-copy print run within a year. Its success convinced Sim to drop the Swords collections and republish their contents as one volume as well.

=== Further volumes ===
Church & State, at 1200 pages, would have been too unwieldy for one volume, so it was published in two—the first in 1987, before the story was finished.

Jaka's Story was the first to be conceived from the beginning with the end "phonebook" collection in mind. When serialized, it prominently displayed the novel name (Jaka's Story) on the cover, and printed both the current issue of the series and the current issue of the novel—so, for example, the January 1989 issue was numbered both Cerebus #119 and Jaka's Story #6.

In High Society, each issue of Cerebus comprised one chapter of the story, but as the series progressed, Sim came to compose the stories with the collected volumes in mind. This meant that the stories would be serialized in the comic book in twenty-page installments, but with little regard for the per-issue reading experience—sometimes an issue would end mid-scene. Many fans started waiting for the collected volumes to be released, abandoning the monthly series—a phenomenon that came to be known as "The Cerebus Effect".

Starting with the thirteenth volume, Going Home, the books featured colour covers. The covers to Going Home and Form & Void were photographs taken by Gerhard.

=== Distribution dispute ===
When Sim published the High Society phonebook, it was initially not available through traditional comic-book direct market distributors, who felt that Cerebus' success until then had been largely due to them and put up "a lot of resistance" to Sim selling directly through the mail.

In retaliation, Diamond Comic Distributors in 1987 chose to drop Puma Blues, which was being published by Sim's Aardvark One International. Diamond's orders accounted for 33% of Puma Blues' sales. To extract themselves from the dispute, the book's creators, Michael Zulli and Stephen Murphy, moved publication of Puma Blues to Mirage Studios.

Sim did not relent on having the "phone books" distributed by the Direct Market until well into the 1990s. Retailers were able to get bulk discounts on boxes of Cerebus phonebooks directly from Aardvark-Vanaheim, however.

== The Cerebus effect ==
Japanese manga strips had been collected and reprinted in tankōbon format since at least the 1930s, but before Cerebus, it was uncommon for American comics to be made available in collected form. Collections, while requiring more money to be spent up front, came to be seen as a way of keeping beloved strips in print. This presented a dilemma to creators, particularly if they relied on the income from the series to support themselves until they could publish enough material for a collection. Comics Journal columnist Bart Beaty coined the term "Cerebus effect" to label this tendency, as Cerebus was seen as the first Western series with which this problem emerged.

Another aspect of the "Cerebus effect" was that Cerebus and certain other serialized comics (such as Chester Brown's Underwater, Gilbert Hernandez' Poison River and Tom Hart's The Sands) would appear in installments that critic Robert Boyd said were "like they were cut randomly from a larger narrative." This hurt the serialized reading experience and further convinced many readers to wait for the collections, to the detriment of the periodical comic sales.

== Printing ==
The books are all softcover and printed on newsprint, printed by Preney Print & Litho, of Windsor, Ontario in Canada. Except for the final four volumes, the covers are all in black and white.

At one time, Sim talked about publishing high-quality, oversized editions of Jaka's Story, but soon scrapped it as a cash-grab. Foreign editions, however, have come out on higher-grade paper, some in hardcover. In March 2015, the eleventh printing of High Society was issued as a high quality, 30th anniversary gold logo signed (by Dave Sim) and numbered (out of 850 copies) on a tipped in bookplate to the inside cover, printed on white paper. This edition had artwork digitally scanned and restored using current technologies with contributions of original artwork by Cerebus fans, acknowledged in the afterword.

== Books ==
=== Novels and collections ===
#	Title	Issues	Orig. dates	Storyline	Year	ISBN	Notes
1	Cerebus	1–25	1977–1981	Cerebus	1987	0-919359-08-6	Third published volume From 11th printing, also contains "Silverspoon" strips
2	High Society	26–50	1981–1983	High Society	1986	0-919359-07-8	First published volume
3	Church and State I	52–80	1983–1985	Church & State	1987	0-919359-09-4	Second published volume
4	Church and State II	81–111	1985–1988	Church & State	1988	0-919359-11-6	
5	Jaka's Story	114–136	1988–1990	Jaka's Story	1990	0-919359-12-4	
6	Melmoth	139–150	1990–1991	Melmoth	1991	0-919359-10-8	
7	Flight	151–162	1991–1992	Mothers & Daughters	1993	0-919359-13-2	first volume published with a volume number
8	Women	163–174	1992–1993	Mothers & Daughters	1994	0-919359-14-0	
9	Reads	175–186	1993–1994	Mothers & Daughters	1995	0-919359-15-9	
10	Minds	187–200	1994–1995	Mothers & Daughters	1996	0-919359-16-7	
11	Guys	201–219	1995–1997	Guys	1997	0-919359-17-5	
12	Rick's Story	220–231	1997–1998	Rick's Story	1998	0-919359-18-3	
13	Going Home	232–250	1998–2000	Going Home	2000	0-919359-19-1	
14	Form and Void	251–265	2000–2001	Going Home	2001	0-919359-20-5	
15	Latter Days	266–288	2001–2003	Latter Days	2003	0-919359-22-1	
16	The Last Day	289–300	2003–2004	Latter Days	2004	0-919359-21-3	

== See also ==
- Graphic novel
- Trade paperback
- Tankōbon
