= Latter Days (disambiguation) =

Latter Days is a 2003 American romance film.

Latter Days may also refer to:

- Latter Days (comics), a graphic novel in the Cerebus series
- Latter Days: Best of Led Zeppelin Volume Two, a compilation album
- Latter days, a term for the end time used in Abrahamic religions
- Latter Day of the Law, one of the Three Ages of Buddhism
- "Latter Days", a song by American band Big Red Machine featuring Anaïs Mitchell from the album How Long Do You Think It's Gonna Last?

== See also ==
- Latter Day Saint movement
