= High Society (comics) =

High Society is a Canadian political cartoon series from the 1980's

- Wraparound cover to Cerebus Vol. 2: High Society. The Regency Hotel drawn by Gerhard, though his art does not appear within the book.
- Date: 1986
- No. of issues: 25
- Series: Cerebus
- Page count: 512 pages
- Publisher: Aardvark-Vanaheim

Creative team
- Creator: Dave Sim

Original publication
- Published in: Cerebus
- Issues: 26–50
- Date of publication: May 1981–May 1983
- ISBN: 0-919359-07-8

Chronology
- Preceded by: Cerebus (1987)
- Followed by: Church & State (1987 and 1988)

High Society is the second collected volume, and first volume-length story, of Canadian cartoonist Dave Sim's Cerebus comic book series. It focuses mainly on politics, including Cerebus's campaign for the office of Prime Minister, in the fictional city-state of Iest in Sim's world of Estarcion. It is generally considered the best book for beginning Cerebus readers to start reading, and has been called "one of the finest storylines of the 1980s". The story was published in individual issues from May 1981 (issue #26) to May 1983 (#50), with the collection published in 1986.

The story is considered a turning point in the Cerebus series, as Sim moved from the "Conan pastiche" of the stories contained in the Cerebus, to making a "piece of political satire," the beginning of Sim moving away from individual issue-focused stories and short, two- or three-issue story arcs, to "longer, far more complex 'novels'" lasting hundreds of pages, that were the focus of the rest of the series.

The storyline became the first of the Cerebus "phone book" paperback collections to be published. Its success led Sim to abandon the Swords of Cerebus series of four-issue collections in favour of the larger collections for the final format of the 6000-page Cerebus saga.

== Background ==
In Cerebus #12, Sim announced his intention to continue Cerebus until December 2003, which, at a bi-monthly pace, would take the series to issue #156.

In Cerebus #19, Sim announced that Cerebus would last 300 issues, and that it would chronicle the life of Cerebus up until his death. Further, the book would be subdivided into "novels". The first of these novels would be High Society—one self-contained story that would nevertheless be only one storyline in the larger Cerebus story.

== Synopsis ==
=== Arrival in Iest ===
Cerebus arrives in the city-state of Iest, where he checks into the high-class Regency Hotel (whose design was based on the Chateau Laurier) and becomes embroiled in political machinations as the Chief Kitchen Supervisor to Lord Julius.

Cerebus is kidnapped for ransom by Dirty Drew and Dirty Fleagle McGrew. Cerebus soon arranges with the kidnappers to split the ransom money, but when the time comes to pick up the ransom, Cerebus is betrayed by the brothers and knocked unconscious, and he enters a long dream sequence where he speaks once again with Suentius Po.

When he comes to, Cerebus finds himself back at the Regency Hotel, where he is told that he is expected to pay back the ransom that was paid for his release. He discovers the Regency Elf in his room, who informs him that the brothers have been captured. He goes to talk with them at the prison, but finds out they never got the money—all they got was a statue of a "duck".

With the help of the Elf, Cerebus contrives to get the money to repay his ransom. At the moment that he seems to have schemed the money out of Holland M. Hadden, Hadden is assassinated by the Moon Roach (a new guise of the Roach; a parody of Moon Knight), who is under the control of Astoria. Cerebus is under the Inquisition's suspicion for Hadden's murder, and is only safe due to his diplomatic status—a situation which is complicated by the Moon Roach's assassination of two members of the Inquisition. Astoria takes Cerebus under her wing, telling him she will make him "embarrassingly wealthy".

=== Campaign ===
During PetuniaCon (a parody and commentary on Comic Book Conventions, put on by Lord Julius), Astoria announces that she has gathered enough disaffected ministers to form a new party that wants to run Cerebus for Prime Minister. Elrod the Albino wins the election to become the ranking diplomatic representative from Palnu, the position formerly held by Cerebus. Cerebus gets a critical letter of recommendation from Mr. Blakely and begins his campaign.

Cerebus tours the various districts of Lest, making speeches while Astoria makes backroom deals with the actual power brokers. Things seem to be going very well, but when the delegates meet to declare how many representatives each candidate will receive, many districts turn away from Cerebus.

=== Election ===
Lord Julius puts forward a goat to run against Cerebus as Prime Minister. Election night ends in a draw, with one vote uncounted. Cerebus sets out with Astoria and the Roach (this time in a caricature of Sergeant Preston of the Mounties to find Lord Storm'send in snowy Northbell to secure the last vote. After talking with Cerebus, Storm'send lights a beacon indicating who he has voted for, but refuses to tell Cerebus whom he has decided on. Cerebus, Astoria and the Roach head back through the snow, but eventually are stopped due to a bridge being out. They check into an inn located by the bridge, where they find out that Cerebus has won.

=== Prime Ministership ===
(Cerebus #45-50) Almost immediately, the government of Iest begins to crumble around Cerebus. Sensing opportunity, several military forces from surrounding regions - notably, the Sepran Empire - begin campaigns to capture the city-state. The new Iestian Pontiff announces the reunification of the Church, and that it will support the Sepran Empire. All of Cerebus' allies abandon him, and he walks out on Astoria. Cerebus is left with nothing and flees the city with the things he came into it with: his sword, his vest, and his medallions. At the very end, he finds the Albatross Statue that eluded so many people for so long; with it, he could have united the church himself and ruled Estarcion. Cerebus destroys the statue and leaves the city.

== Characters ==
Cerebus
A grey anthropomorphic aardvark, who becomes Prime Minister of the fictional city of Iest. His personality is that of an aggressive drunk who has a short temper.
The McGrew Brothers—Dirty Fleagle and Dirty Drew
Fighting brothers who at first kidnap Cerebus for ransom money, but later become part of Cerebus' fold. Visually based on Gene Day and his brother Dan, with speech patterns like Yosemite Sam.
The Regency Elf
A childlike, playful spirit who inhabits Cerebus' rooms at the Regency Hotel in High Society; at first, only Cerebus can see her. She helps Cerebus with some of his political scheming, though, as innocent as she seems, it's all just a game to her. She is inspired in part by Elfquest and its creator Wendy Pini. Visually, the Regency Elf is inspired by Debbie Harry.
The Roach
Also called Artemis, the Roach is Sim's vehicle for comic book parodies. In High Society, he follows Astoria, and first comes into the story as Moon Roach (a parody of Marvel Comics' Moon Knight), who commits political assassinations for Astoria, and later as Sergeant Preston (a parody of Sergeant William Preston of the Challenge of the Yukon radio program). As Cerebus rises in the political world, the Roach takes on the rôle of his bodyguard, while secretly and jealously believing that Cerebus is stealing Astoria away from him.
Astoria
A beautiful political manipulator, Lord Julius' ex-wife, and the main driving force behind Cerebus' campaign to become Prime Minister in High Society.
Lord Julius
Lord of Palnu, a city-state to which Iest is considerably in debt. Cerebus has attracted a lot of attention as he had been Lord Julius' Kitchen Staff Supervisor, and is believed to have influence with Lord Julius, who strongly resembles Groucho Marx.
Duke Leonardi
Leader of Serrea, cousin to Lord Julius. A caricature based on Chico Marx.

== Publication ==
Originally published in issues #26-50 of Sim's monthly Cerebus series between May 1981 and May 1983, High Society was published as a 512-page paperpack "phone book" collection in 1986, originally with a print run of 6000, printed by Preney Print & Litho Inc. of Windsor, Ontario, Canada. Its tenth printing came out in 2005. The eleventh printing was released in March 2015 as a limited edition 30th anniversary Gold Logo edition signed (by Dave Sim) and numbered (out of 850) on a glued-in bookplate inside the front cover. This edition was printed on white paper, with images re-scanned and digitally "cleaned up" using current technology, ISBN 0-919359-07-8, UPC 9 780919 359079 53000, originally priced at US$30. The High Society logo on the front cover was printed in gold foil.

Between 1985 and 1988, Sim underwent negotiations with DC Comics, in which DC offered $100,000 and 10% of licensing and merchandising. During this time, Sim set up a dedicated 800 number and announced in Cerebus #86 (May 1986) that he would put out the first printing of the High Society "phone book" through mail order. The book sold out in less than a year, and grossed $150,000, which made DC's offer seem "kind of puny by comparison", according to Sim.

Sim's artistic partner, Gerhard had not yet joined him when High Society was being made, but had joined him shortly before the High Society "phone book" was first published, and so was able to provide the drawing of the Regency Hotel on the wraparound cover.

The collection was dedicated to Barry Windsor-Smith, Neal Adams and Mike Kaluta.

=== Dispute with Diamond Comic Distributors ===
The book was initially not available through traditional comic-book Direct Market distributors, who felt that Cerebus' success until then had been largely due to them, and put up "a lot of resistance" to Sim selling direct. As a result, in 1987 Diamond Comic Distributors chose to drop Puma Blues, which was being published by Sim's Aardvark One International. Diamond's orders accounted for 33% of Puma Blues' sales. In order to get out of the dispute, the book's creators moved publication to Mirage Studios. Sim didn't relent on having the "phone books" distributed by the Direct Market until well into the 1990s.

== Foreign editions ==
Sim had long disallowed foreign-language editions of Cerebus, saying couldn't be sure of the accuracy of the translations since he couldn't read any language other than English. In 2010, he finally allowed a number of translations.

Language	Title	Publisher	Date	Translator	ISBN	Notes
Spanish	Alta Sociedad	Ponent Mon	April 2010	Andrés Moon	978-8-492-44449-6	Hardcover
French	High Society: "Une Histoire de Cerebus"	Vertige Graphic	August 2010		978-2-849-99080-3	Softcover with flaps on the inside front cover
Italian	Alta Società	Black Velvet Editrice	November 2010	Francesco Matteuzzi	978-8-896-19717-2	Hardcover with dust jacket

== See also ==
- Direct Market
- Marx Brothers
- Trade Paperback (comics)
