= Cerebus the Aardvark =

Comic book

- Cover to Cerebus Issues #112 and #113, from 1988 by Dave Sim and Gerhard

Publication information
- Publisher: Aardvark-Vanaheim
- Schedule: Initially bimonthly, then monthly
- Format: Ongoing series (concluded)
- Genre: Parody of sword and sorcery (early issues), fantasy, comedy, political satire, drama (mid-period issues), theological fiction (later issues)
- Publication date: December 1977 – March 2004
- No. of issues: 300
- Main character: Cerebus
- ISSN: 0712-7774

Creative team
- Created by: Dave Sim
- Written by: Dave Sim
- Artist(s): Dave Sim; Gerhard

Cerebus (/ˈsɛrəbəs/; also Cerebus the Aardvark) is a comic book series, created by Canadian cartoonist Dave Sim, which ran from December 1977 until March 2004. The title character of the 300-issue series is an anthropomorphic aardvark who takes on a number of roles throughout the series, including barbarian, prime minister, and pope. The series stands out for its experimentation in form and content, and for the dexterity of its artwork, especially after background artist Gerhard joined with the 65th issue. As the series progressed, it increasingly became a platform for Sim's controversial beliefs.

The comic began as a parody of sword and sorcery comics, primarily Marvel's version of Conan the Barbarian. However, it evolved to explore a variety of other topics, including politics, religion, and gender issues. At a total of 6,000 pages, it progressively became more serious and ambitious than its parodic roots. Sim announced early on that the series would end with the death of the title character. The story has a large cast of characters, many of which began as parodies of characters from comic books and popular culture.

Starting with the "High Society" storyline, the series became divided into self-contained "novels", which form parts of the overall story. The ten "novels" of the series have been collected in 16 books, known as "Cerebus phonebooks" for their resemblance, by way of their thickness, to telephone directories. At a time when the series was about 70% completed, celebrated comic book writer Alan Moore wrote: "Cerebus, as if I need to say so, is still to comic books what Hydrogen is to the Periodic Table".

== Publication history ==
Cerebus was self-published by Dave Sim under his Aardvark-Vanaheim, Inc. publishing banner. For the first few years the company's publisher was Deni Loubert, Sim's girlfriend (the two married and divorced during the comic's run). Sim's position as a pioneering self-publisher in comics inspired numerous writer/artists after him, most notably Jeff Smith (Bone), Terry Moore (Strangers in Paradise), and Martin Wagner (Hepcats).

In 1979, Sim, who was at the time a frequent marijuana user, began using LSD, taking the drug with such frequency that he was eventually hospitalized. It was this incident that Sim claims led to the inspiration to produce Cerebus for 300 monthly issues.

When Sim published the first Cerebus "phone book", a paperback collection of the High Society graphic novel (Issues #26–#50), he angered distributors—who felt that their support had been instrumental in his series' success in an industry generally indifferent to small publishers—by offering the first printing via mail order only. The decision was a financial windfall for Sim, however, grossing over $150,000 in sales (equivalent to $441,000 in 2025). Sim became known for picking up hotel tabs for self-publishers and helping other self-publishers by paying for meals and limo service between stops. Negotiations regarding DC buying Cerebus took place over the course of 1985 to 1988, offering $100,000 ($272,000 today) and 10% of all licensing and merchandising, which Sim rejected.

The series hit a personal sales record with issue #100 which, despite being a normal issue in the middle of a story arc, had a print run of 36,000 copies. Sales took a substantial drop over the next 50 issues, however, and Sim commented that the fact that readers could not simply "jump in" to Cerebus, and had to read the entire series in order to be able to understand the current issue, was a major reason for the sales drop.

In July 1984, Cerebus publisher Aardvark-Vanaheim was threatened with possible legal action by Marvel Comics over a parody of Wolverine in Cerebus.

When Sim guest-wrote the 10th issue of Todd McFarlane's comics series Spawn, he donated his entire fee—over $100,000—to the Comic Book Legal Defense Fund.

"Jaka's Story", a tragic character study dealing with gender roles and the political suppression of art, is generally cited as the series' pinnacle of narrative achievement. Later issues of the series became highly personal, and began to alienate many long-time fans, female readers especially. Issue #186 (collected in Reads) contained a lengthy prose section that was attacked by some readers and critics for what they perceived as overt misogyny, and which Sim describes as "anti-feminism". During this part of the story, the storyline consisted of a textual treatise written by Viktor Davis, a fictional "Reads" author, interspersed with the main Cerebus storyline. In Davis's material, he refers to the "creative male light" and the "emotional female void", a reversal of the gender-based view of creation espoused by the Judge at the end of Church and State (in which the "female light" is raped by the "male void" and shatters into the physical universe). As Sim himself says in an interview with The Comics Journal, "Cerebus #1–200 [is] the completion of the story. The yin and yang. The ultra-female reading. The ultra-male reading. I'm attaching an allegory to the Big Bang. You make up your mind which one's the pit and which one's the top of the mountain." By the end of the series, the Void is again male and identified as God, and the Light is female, now identified with YHWH. Issue #186 was followed by another essay in the back of issue #265 called "Tangent", in which Sim identified a "feminist/homosexualist axis" that opposed traditional and rational societal values. This material appeared as Sim was retreating from public life and becoming more marginalized by his peers in the industry.

Sim himself appeared as a character in Cerebus, as when he berated the title character in the "Minds" story arc.

Sim's religious beliefs heavily influenced the last third of Cerebus's storyline. Once an atheist, Sim became a believer in God while gathering research material for "Rick's Story". However, rather than following an established religion, Sim follows his own personal belief system cobbled together from elements of Judaism, Christianity, and Islam, although he described himself in issue #8 of Following Cerebus as "mostly Muslim". A 2003 magazine interview describes Sim as reciting a prayer of his own devising five times a day (which was published in the back of issue #300), and as having sold much of his furniture to donate the money to charity as an act of religious asceticism. In an editorial contained in issue #297, Sim stated that he regards the production of Cerebus as of secondary importance to his religious practice. Sim's religious beliefs tie into his views on gender, and the bulk of the Cerebus storyline after "Guys" deals with this, especially "Rick's Story", "Latter Days", and "The Last Day".

A quarterly publication, Following Cerebus, followed in August 2004. Following Cerebus features correspondence, essays, and previously unpublished artwork from Sim, as well as interviews with other comic writers and artists.

Sim was rumored to have said that had he died or otherwise chosen not to complete Cerebus prior to issue #300, the remaining issues were to either consist of blank pages or Gerhard was to have drawn his backgrounds only, leaving Sim's contribution blank. It is not known if this plan was ever serious, since it was never put into effect. At the completion of the series, Sim directed that upon his and Gerhard's death, Cerebus would enter into the public domain. Effective 31 December 2006, Sim purchased Gerhard's share of the company. Sim has already granted a general license for other creators to use his characters in their own works, stating that he is trying to be consistent with his own appropriation of others' works.

In early 2009, Sim launched the bimonthly series Cerebus Archive, a bimonthly series featuring material from his archives, including early comics, correspondence, artwork and commentary on his work. It was translated into Italian; and in 2011, Church and State Vol. I was published in Spanish.

== Published volumes ==
=== Cerebus ===
Issues #1–25.

This first story arc, uniquely in this series, consists of one to three-issue storylines with only occasional back-references. Cerebus is introduced as an amoral barbarian mercenary, fighting (and betraying) for money and drinking it away. During his adventures, he encounters the warrior Pigts (whose religion reveres aardvarks) and the insane wizard Necross, who turns himself into a giant stone Thrunk (visually similar to Marvel Comics' The Thing). Most of the series' prominent characters are introduced (or at least mentioned) in these issues, including Elrod of Melvinbone (a parodic representation of Michael Moorcock's Elric of Melniboné), Lord Julius (a politician based upon Julius "Groucho" Marx), the Cockroach (who would evolve into an all-purpose parody of Marvel and DC superhero characters), and Jaka Tavers. The series takes a sharp change in direction with issue #20 which is the first of the "Mind Games" issues that are a feature of the comic and introduces the philosophical Suenteus Po and the ultra-matriarchial Cirinists.

=== High Society ===
Issues #26–50.

Cerebus comes to the wealthy city-state of Iest as the representative of Lord Julius's city-state of Palnu. He quickly finds himself enmeshed in the fast-paced world of high finance and politics, and comic tension is built through his ignorance of the "high society" machinations going on around him. Cerebus is befriended by the legendary Regency Elf as he adjusts to his new circumstances. He meets and soon finds himself maneuvered into a political campaign by the mysterious Astoria, who is also manipulating Artemis into pseudo-super hero identities that are parodies of Moon Knight and later Sergeant Preston of the Mounties. Cerebus recognizes that he is a pawn in a political game between Lord Julius and Astoria, but he struggles to assert himself and ultimately confounds the expectations of everyone attempting to use him. Cerebus is eventually elected Prime Minister of Iest, but launches an unnecessary war of conquest that causes him to lose everything.

=== Church & State I ===
Issues #52–80.

After some travels, Cerebus returns to Iest and is manipulated by Weisshaupt, who wants to use Cerebus's popularity with the masses, into again becoming Prime Minister of Iest. Weisshaupt has maneuvered himself into the tenuous presidency of a federation of states (including Iest, Palnu and New Sepra) as a bulwark against the Cirinists. Weisshaupt lures Cerebus into a drunken marriage to Red Sophia, but ultimately loses his influence over Cerebus when Weisshaupt's rival, Bishop Powers, appoints Cerebus Pope of the Eastern Church of Tarim. Finally out from under anyone else's control, Cerebus lets absolute power go to his head and demands that all the citizens must give him all their gold or face the end of the world. Sophia walks out on Cerebus, and then he discovers that Jaka is married and pregnant. Cerebus is threatened by Weisshaupt's secret invention of cannons, but Weisshaupt suffers a heart attack and Cerebus continues his papal reign of terror. He is finally ejected from the Upper City by the sudden invasion of the giant stone Thrunk, who claims to be the God Tarim.

=== Church & State II ===
Issues #81–111.

Cerebus returns to Iest's Upper City and uses Weisshaupt's cannons to destroy Thrunk and reclaim the papacy. Astoria has mysteriously killed the Western pope ("the Lion of Serrea"), and Cerebus must execute her for the crime in order to retain his papacy. Cerebus confronts her in a dungeon, and after being taunted by Astoria, he grants himself a divorce from Red Sophia, marries himself to Astoria, rapes her, and then divorces himself from her. Astoria's trial, which echoes with similarities to a repeating pattern of historical executions of reformers, is interrupted when Cerebus makes the predicted Ascension to the Moon that is the culmination of the land's religious prophecy. There, Cerebus meets the Judge, a timeless, godlike being who has watched over history from the very beginning. (Sim had based the personality of this character on cartoonist and playwright Jules Feiffer.) The Judge explains his version of the creation myth of Cerebus's universe, before warning Cerebus that he will live only a few more years before dying "alone, unmourned and unloved". The Judge tells Cerebus that if the Aardvark ever questions his suffering, he should remember his "second marriage" to Astoria. Cerebus then falls back to earth, where he discovers that the Cirinists have invaded, and his empire has collapsed.

=== Jaka's Story ===
Issues #114–136.

Cerebus returns to Iest, now under a brutal Cirinist dictatorship, and runs into Jaka again. She is illegally working as a dancer in her landlord's tavern. The landlord/barman, Pud, treats Jaka kindly but secretly spends his days lusting after her. Cerebus agrees to live with Jaka and her husband Rick as their houseguest. That story is interwoven with unreliable tales of Jaka's childhood told by a writer, representing Oscar Wilde, using notes and stories provided by Rick. In the end Cerebus disguises himself and travels to the Lower City to buy a jar of paint. While he is gone, the Cirinists find the tavern, kill Pud and arrest Jaka, Rick, and Oscar. Jaka is made to sign a confession of immoral behavior, and is reunited with Rick; however, the Cirinists reveal to Rick that Jaka aborted the son that Rick always wanted. He lashes out at Jaka and is allowed to divorce her (although he is maimed for striking her). Jaka returns to Palnu, and Cerebus returns to the inn to find it in ruins.

=== Melmoth ===
Issues #139–150.

This story arc concentrates on the last days and death of Oscar Wilde (who is attended to by his trusted companion Robbie Ross) rather than on Cerebus himself, who appears in only a few pages. (The title refers to the gothic novel Melmoth the Wanderer by Charles Robert Maturin, a relative of Wilde's. Wilde adopted this alias during this period of his life.) Meanwhile, a catatonic Cerebus, believing Jaka to be dead, spends his days mourning on the patio of a café. In the last few pages of the story, after the main action had concluded, Cerebus overhears a conversation by two Cirinist jailers insulting Jaka. Enraged, Cerebus murders one of the guards and then springs into action.

=== Flight ===
Issues #151–162.

First part of the "Mothers & Daughters" story arc. Cerebus's return to Iest and slaughter of Cirinists leads to a very brief failed revolution. Cerebus descends into darkness and speaks with Suenteus Po. Meanwhile, Cirin works to manage her sect and arrange her own Ascension. Artemis, with Elrod as his sidekick, also stages his own impromptu revolution under his new persona "Punisheroach", a parody of the Marvel comics character the Punisher.

=== Women ===
Issues #163–174.

Second part of the story-arc "Mothers & Daughters". Cerebus crashes back to earth. He is assisted by a mysterious old woman who is being openly spied upon by the Cirinists; she sends him to a bar to hide. This story arc includes a parody of Neil Gaiman's The Sandman in which the Roach plays "Swoon" (a parody of Dream) and Elrod plays "Snuff" (a trans person parody of Death). Astoria and Cirin symbolically duel in a dream realm. The book includes excerpts from books written by Astoria and Cirin that describe their differing beliefs. Cerebus flies across the city to slay Astoria, but is interrupted by the arrival of Suenteus Po.

=== Reads ===
Issues #175–186.

Third part of the "Mothers & Daughters" story arc. This book primarily consists of two long text pieces. The first revolves around an author of Reads, heavily illustrated books in Cerebus's world. In this story, there is a strong thread about the dangers of commercial success and "selling out". The series moves from this storyline to a long essay attributed to Viktor Davis, a fictional Reads author. This essay puts forth a theory on the nature of the sexes, describing the "Female Void" focused on feeling, and the "Male Light" focused on reason. These two stories are accompanied by a long discussion between Cirin, Astoria, Cerebus, and Suenteus Po. Po gives information about aardvarks, including that all aardvarks have Cerebus's "magnifier" quality, and attempts to convince each of the others to abandon their pursuits of power and return to what they enjoy doing most, then leaves them to their fates. Astoria is convinced and also leaves, but not before giving Cerebus information about her history with Cirin and also informing him of his hermaphrodite nature. Cerebus and Cirin then engage in a long and brutal fight, which leads to the beginning of another ascension.

=== Minds ===
issue #187–200.

Fourth and concluding part of the "Mothers & Daughters" story arc. Cerebus and Cirin ascend, then are separated by a mysterious force. As Cerebus flies through the Solar System, he is shown images from his past and is forced to reconsider his actions and his faith. He then encounters a disembodied voice calling itself "Dave" that acknowledges itself as Cerebus's creator. "Dave" shows Cerebus the history of the Cirinist movement, revealing that Cirin is actually named Serna and was the best friend of the real Cirin (the old woman Cerebus encountered in Women), but usurped Cirin's leadership and effectively exchanged identities with her. "Dave" then gives Cerebus information about his past, showing that Cerebus unwittingly ruined his original destiny, causing chaotic repercussions which have influenced most of his adventures. Cerebus demands that "Dave" make Jaka love him; in response, "Dave" shows Cerebus visions of possible futures between himself and Jaka, all of which are disastrously flawed for both of them due to Cerebus's nature. After a period of penance and self-reflection on Pluto, Cerebus asks "Dave" to place him in a bar he remembers from his mercenary days.

=== Guys ===
Issues #201–219.

Cerebus spends time, and eventually becomes bartender, in one of the Cirinists' bars where "degenerate" men are essentially quarantined from the female citizens. Described in the trade paperback's introduction as based on a bar that Sim frequented during a near-alcoholic stint between relationships, the series features various parodic characters who come and go while Cerebus remains stationary. Cerebus begins a somewhat reluctant relationship with a woman named Joanne, who was first introduced in one of the possible futures with Jaka that "Dave" showed Cerebus in Minds.

=== Rick's Story ===
Issues #220–231.

Eventually Jaka's ex-husband Rick arrives at the bar. He has significantly aged, become a heavy drinker (having barely been able to tolerate alcohol in "Jaka's Story"), and it is gradually revealed that the mental and emotional scars from the events at the end of "Jaka's Story" have left him mildly insane. Rick is working on a book about his life, which gradually becomes a religious work in which Cerebus is a holy figure and Rick his follower. Joanne returns and taunts Cerebus by courting Rick. At the end of the book, Rick departs, for reasons not entirely clear, and tells Cerebus that he will see Rick only once more in his life. After Rick has left, Jaka shows up at the bar, and she and Cerebus depart together, heading for Cerebus's childhood home of Sand Hills Creek.

=== Going Home ===
Issues #232–250.

First part of the "Going Home" story arc. Cerebus and Jaka travel across land, then on a river boat. Cerebus is eager to make as much time as possible, as he fears being trapped in the mountains near Sand Hills Creek by winter, but instead he indulges Jaka's desire for shopping and public appearances. Along the way, they encounter veiled hostility from the Cirinists. Cerebus and Jaka's relationship begins to show signs of deterioration, and Jaka is almost tempted away by F. Stop Kennedy (a fictional version of F. Scott Fitzgerald), a writer who has accompanied them on their river boat.

=== Form & Void ===
Issues #251–265.

Second and concluding part of the story arc "Going Home". Cerebus and Jaka continue their journey towards Sand Hills Creek, in the company of Ham and Mary Ernestway, analogues to Ernest Hemingway and his fourth wife, Mary. On the trip, Mary tells them about some of her and Ham's journeys. This material is based on Mary Hemingway's journals about Ernest's last African safaris prior to his death. Ham dies in what appears to be suicide, but Cerebus becomes convinced Mary murdered him and flees in panic, taking Jaka with him. They discover that they have been traveling in circles without making any significant progress toward Sand Hills Creek, and nearly die in a blizzard. They finally arrive in Sand Hills Creek only to find that Cerebus's parents are dead and the rest of the community has shunned Cerebus for his perceived abandonment of his family. Cerebus drives Jaka away, blaming her for keeping him away too long.

=== Latter Days ===
Issues #266–288.

First part of the story arc "Latter Days". After a prodigious leap in time over two issues, Cerebus returns from the north intent on provoking the Cirinists into killing him. Instead, he is captured by a trio of characters based on the Three Stooges, who await a religious revelation from him. While Cerebus was in the north, a religious movement developed out of the teachings of Rick and his writings about Cerebus. Once Cerebus supplies the required revelation, he inspires a successful anti-Cirinist rebellion and a subsequent reordering of society. Much of the second half of this chapter consists of Cerebus giving a highly idiosyncratic analysis of the Torah. Published over the course of nearly a year, this section, called "Chasing YHWH", was presented almost entirely in text format, with minimal art. This story arc is unusual in that disembodied thought balloons give the impression that Cerebus is speaking directly to the reader at times. It is revealed in the last issue of the arc that Cerebus has been talking to a female reporter who bears a striking resemblance to Jaka. He eventually falls in love with the woman and marries her.

=== The Last Day ===
Issues #289–300.

The second and concluding part of "Latter Days", and the conclusion of the series as a whole. In the first 40 pages Cerebus has a dream or vision in which cosmology is seen as a reflection of theology, complete with explanatory footnotes by Sim. Upon waking Cerebus—now incredibly aged, decrepit, pain-wracked, and mildly senile—makes the laborious trek to his writing desk to write down his new revelation. He then hides the manuscript, and it is implied that nobody will find it for two thousand years.

Cerebus spends most of the rest of the book trying to persuade his chief of security, Walter O'Reilly (named after Corporal Walter (Radar) O'Reilly from M*A*S*H), to admit his son, Shep-Shep, with whom he remembers sharing an idyllic father–son relationship. However, the Sanctuary is under lockdown due to opposition from a new and even more rabidly "feminist-homosexualist" group led by Shep-Shep's mother, whom Cerebus refers to as "New Joanne", which favors such "rights" as pedophilia, zoophilia, juvenile recreational drug use and lesbian motherhood. As a result, social values have undergone a complete breakdown.

Cerebus finally goes to bed despairing of seeing his son again, but Shep-Shep manages to sneak into Cerebus's room late that night. Their subsequent conversation shatters Cerebus's last illusions about his son. Shep-Shep has aligned himself with his mother, who has been conducting genetic engineering experiments, partly with knowledge gained from Cirin's earlier experimentation. Cerebus is disgusted and horrified when Shep-Shep shows him the results of one of the experiments, a lion cub with a human baby's head, and explains his mother's plans.

As Shep-Shep leaves, Cerebus grabs a knife, intending to kill him, but falls out of bed and breaks his neck. He dies alone, unmourned, and unloved, just as the Judge had predicted. His life flashes before his eyes in a series of flashback panels and his ghost sees many of his old friends and enemies waiting for him in "the Light". Jaka, Bear, and Ham beckon to him, and he eagerly rushes to join them, thinking they are in Heaven, but then he notices the absence of Rick and realizes that the Light may in fact be Hell. He calls out to God for help, but is dragged into the Light nonetheless.

== Other appearances ==
=== Comics Buyer's Guide ===
- "Silverspoon", Prince Valiant comic strip parody, 11 pages published weekly in Comics Buyer's Guide, reprinted in Swords of Cerebus vol. 4 and in the Cerebus "phone book" from 11th printing on

=== Swords of Cerebus ===
Each of the six issues includes one or two Cerebus stories not all of which are included in the "phone books".

Swords of Cerebus vol. 1, January 1981

- "The Name of the Game Is Diamondback", 7 pages, layouts by Marshall Rogers, story and art by Sim, January 1981

Swords of Cerebus vol. 2, June 1981

- "Demonhorn" (first appeared in Nucleus #1), 5 pages, story and art by Sim
- "The Morning After", 6 pages, inks by Josef Rubinstein

Swords of Cerebus vol. 3, Fall 1981

- "What Happened Between Issues #20 and #21", 8 pages

Swords of Cerebus vol. 4, Fall 1982

- "Magiking", 10 pages
- "Silverspoon", (first appeared in Comics Buyer's Guide), 11 pages,

Swords of Cerebus Vol 5, Summer 1983

- "Cerebus Dreams", written and drawn by Barry Windsor Smith

Swords of Cerebus Vol 6, Fall 1984

- "A Night on the Town"

All of the stories above except "Demonhorn" were reprinted in "Cerebus World Tour Book 1995"

=== Epic Illustrated ===
- "His First Fifth", 9 color pages, October 1984
- "A Friendly Reminder", 3 color pages, February 1985
- "Selling Insurance", 2 color pages, June 1985
- "The Girl Next Door", 3 color pages, June 1985

=== AV in 3D ===
- "Cerebus Dreams II", 4 3D pages, December 1984

=== Cerebus Jam #1, April 1986 ===
- "The Defense of Fort Columbia", by Sim, Gerhard, Scott and Bo Hampton, 6 pages
- "The First Invention of Armour, 1404" by Sim, Gerhard, and Murphy Anderson, 6 pages
- "Squinteye the Sailor" by Sim, Gerhard, and Terry Austin, 5 pages
- "Cerebus versus the Spirit", Sim, Gerhard, and Will Eisner, 4 pages

=== Anything Goes! #3 ===
- "Breaking Up is Hard to Do", 3 color pages plus cover, March 1986

=== Teenage Mutant Ninja Turtles #8 ===
- "Teenage Mutant Ninja Turtles and Cerebus the Aardvark", by Eastman, Laird, Sim and Gerhard, 43 pages plus cover, 1986

=== Spawn ===
Spawn #10, May 1993

- "Crossing Over", 22 color pages plus cover, story by Sim, art by Todd McFarlane

=== Glamourpuss ===
The March 2011 (incorrectly dated March 2010 on the reverse cover) issue of Glamourpuss #18, written and drawn by Sim

- "What if Cerebus had lived in the age of Mad Men", 10 pages.

=== Cerebus in Hell? ===
In November 2016, Sim launched Cerebus in Hell? with issue #0, followed by four additional issues in 2017. Cerebus, having died in Cerebus #300, is now in what appears to be Hell, wandering—and, as usual, badmouthing—his way through Gustave Doré's famous illustrations for Dante Alighieri's Divine Comedy. Small pictures of Cerebus, copied from the Cerebus comic book, with only a few poses repeated throughout, are added to the art.

=== Cerebus #1s ===
Starting in August 2017, Dave Sim began to write and publish a series of monthly comic books, all numbered "#1", and all satires of various classic comic books. The first, Batvark #1, is a satire of Batman #1, the second, Aardvark Comics #1, a satire of Action Comics #1. As with Cerebus in Hell, the artwork is by Gustave Doré with small pictures of Cerebus added.

Cerebus in Hell? Presents

- #1 Cerebus in Hell? No. 0, November 2016
- #2 Cerebus in Hell? No. 1 (1/4), January 2017
- #3 Cerebus in Hell? No. 2 (2/4), February 2017
- #4 Cerebus in Hell? No. 3 (3/4), March 2017
- #5 Cerebus in Hell? No. 4 (4/4), April 2017
- #6 Batvark #1, August 2017
- #7 Aardvark Comics #1, September 2017
- #8 Strange Cerebus #1, October 2017
- #9 Death of Cerebus in Hell #1, November 2017
- #10 Cerebus: The Vark Knight Returns #1, December 2017
- #11 Watchvark #1, January 2018
- #12 The Amazing Cerebus #1, February 2018
- #13 World's Finite Cerebus #1, March 2018
- #14 Love and Aardvarks #1, April 2018
- #15 The Undateable Cerebus #1, May 2018
- #16 The Un-Bedable Vark #1, June 2018
- #17 Teenage Mutant Ninja Cerebi #1, July 2018
- #18 Nick Calm, Agent of C.O.D.P.I.E.C.E. #1, August 2018
- #19 Crisis of Infinite Cerebi #1, September 19, 2018
- #20 The League of Extraordinary Cerebi #1, October 2018
- #21 Cerberus in Hell? #1, November 2018
- #22 Canadian Vark! #1, December 2018
- #23 Giant-Size Jingles #1, January 2019
- #24 Cerebus the Aardvark In: Sim City - A Dave to Kill For #1, February 2019
- #25 Cerebus the Aardvark In: Sim City - That Issue After #1 / Teenage Money-Nabbing Cerebi #0, March 2019
- #26 Super Cerebus Annual #1, April 2019
- #27 Cerebus Woman #1, May 2019
- #28 LGBTQ etc. People #1, June 2019
- #29 Fornicators inc. #1, July 2019
- #30 Tales of Sophistication #1, August 2019
- #31 The Iron Manticore #1, September 2019
- #32 Colour Your Own Cerebus in Hell? #1, October 2019
- #33 Vark Wars #1, November 2019
- #34 Vark Thing #1, December 2019
- #35 The House of Cerebus #1, January 2020
- #36 The Silver Cerebus #1, February 2020
- #37 The Varking Dead #1, March 2020
- #38 Green Dante/Green Virgil #1, April 2020
- #39 Vark Wars: Walt's Empire Strikes Back #1, May 2020
- #40 Attractive Cousins #1, July 2020
- #41 The Amicable Spider-Vark Annual #1, August 2020
- #42 Batvark Penis #1, September 2020
  - #42 Batvark Penis #1 Virgin Cover Variant, September 2020
  - #42 Batvark XXXXX #1 <Censored-for-Grandma Variant>, September 2020
  - #42 Batvark XXXXX #1 <Censored-for-Grandma Variant> (Second Printing), January 2021
- #43 The Vault of Cerebus #1, Octoberish 2020
- #44 Spider-Whore #1, November 2020
- #45 Hermann #1, December 2020
  - #45 Hermann #1 Virgin Cover Variant, December 2020
- #46 Cerebus in Hell? 2021 #1, January 2021
- #47 The Amazing Batvark #1, February 2021
- #48 Flaming Cerebus Comics #1, March 2021
- #49 Cerebus The Duck #1, April 2021
- #50 Baby Yoda Cerebus #1, May 2021
- #51 Strangers in Cerebus #1, June 2021
- #52 The Unethical Spider-Vark #1, July 2021
- #53 Crisis In Infinite Quarantine #1, August 2021
- #54 Batvark: Coronavirus - There Are No Comics #1, September 2021
  - #54 Batvark: Coronavirus - While Diamond Slept: 2020 #1, September 2021
- #55 Super-Cerebus VS. Covid-19 #1, October 2021
  - #55 Super-Cerebus VS. Covid-19 #1 Wraparound Cover Variant, October 2021
- #56 The League of Extraordinary Corona #1, November 2021
- #57 Coronavirus Book #1, December 2021
- #58 Cerebus in Hell? Presents #58 Cerebus in Hell? 2022 #1, January 2022
- #59 Cerebus in Hell? Presents #59 Defective Comics Annual #1, February 2022
- #60 Cerebus in Hell? Presents #60 Cerebus the Emily #1, March 2022
  - #60 Cerebus in Hell? Presents #60 Cerebus the Emily #1 Harpies' Bizzaarre Variant, March 2022
- #61 Cerebus in Hell? Presents #61 Batvark: A Poet in the Family #1, April 2022
  - #61 Cerebus in Hell? Presents #61 Batvark: A Poet in the Family #1 Batvark-Girl Variant, April 2022
- #62 Cerebus in Hell? Presents #62 Grey A.L.@. #1, May 2022
- #63 Cerebus in Hell? Presents #63 Giant-Size Public Defenders #1, June 2022
  - #63 Cerebus in Hell? Presents #63 Giant-Size Public Defender: Varkdevil Variant #1, June 2022
- #64 Cerebus in Hell? Presents #64 The Uncrucifiable Cerebus Goes To A Gay Bar #1, July 2022
- #65 Cerebus in Hell? Presents #65 Kurtz VZ Kurtz #1, August 2022
- #66 Cerebus in Hell? Presents #66 Flailing at Love #1, September 2022
- #67 Cerebus in Hell? Presents #67 Hell 'O Dali #1, October 2022
- #68 Cerebus in Hell? Presents #68 BTVRK #1, November 2022
- #69 Cerebus in Hell? Presents #69 Giant-Size Aardvark Vanaheim Three-Wheeler Long-Winded Title Logo Annual #1, December 2022
- #70 Cerebus in Hell? Presents #70 Cerebus in Hell? 2023 #1, January 2023
- #71 Cerebus in Hell? Presents #71 Cancel America Comics #1, February 2023
- #72 Cerebus in Hell? Presents #72 AV Team-Up #1, March 2023
- #73 Cerebus in Hell? Presents #73 New Varks #1, April 2023
- #74 Cerebus in Hell? Presents #74 Aversions #1, May 2023
- #75 Cerebus in Hell? Presents #75 She-Aversions #1, June 2023
- #76 Cerebus in Hell? Presents #76 War In Hell? #1, July 2023
- #77 Cerebus in Hell? Presents #77 Aardvarkian Splendor #1, August 2023

== Characters ==
=== Cerebus ===
Cerebus is a misanthropic, amoral, anthropomorphic 3-foot-tall (91 cm) bipedal gray aardvark, although like other anthropomorphic characters in the series, he was born to ordinary human parents. He refers to himself by name, in the third person, with occasional exceptions in the early issues and later intentional uses of the first-person pronoun when Cerebus makes speeches while campaigning for office. Although Cerebus identifies as male and is treated as such, biologically, he is hermaphroditic. Possessing both sexes' genitalia and reproductive systems, Cerebus is theoretically capable of impregnating himself. However, a childhood injury to his uterus makes this impossible.

=== Supporting characters ===
Jaka Tavers
The love of Cerebus's life. A dancer by profession, she is the niece of Lord Julius and (ex-)wife of Rick Nash.
Lord Julius
Grandlord of the city-state of Palnu, who exercises control by making the bureaucracy incredibly dense and incomprehensible. Julius is crafty and intelligent, but often plays the fool to confuse and baffle opponents. His character design and behavior is based on Groucho Marx, including snappy insults, a constant cigar, the chicken walk, and a painted-on mustache.
Astoria
A beautiful political manipulator, Lord Julius's ex-wife, and the main driving force behind Cerebus's campaign to become prime minister in High Society. She is the leader of the Kevillists, a feminist sect which opposes Cirin. The Kevillists mirror the Cirinists' philosophy, but would prefer power in the hands of daughters instead of mothers. She is named for actress Mary Astor, and may be inspired in some ways by Sim's ex-wife Deni Loubert, though Sim himself denies this in issue 298.
Cirin
Leader of the Cirinists, a matriarchal fascist sect which conquers Estarcion at the conclusion of the Church and State storyline. Originally named Serna, she took the name and effectively exchanged identities with the real Cirin, whose views were much less militaristic. The sect honors mothers primarily, also giving high honors to daughters (potential mothers) and children. Men are tolerated. Like Cerebus, she is an aardvark.
Elrod the Albino (Elrod of Melvinbone)
Essentially Michael Moorcock's Elric of Melnibone with the voice and personality of Senator Claghorn (or Foghorn Leghorn), Elrod is an almost purely comic character whose main purpose is to frustrate and enrage Cerebus. In Reads it is revealed that he was created by Cerebus's proximity to a magic gem, and after learning this he vanishes from existence. However, Joanne tells Cerebus she and her husband used to live next door to Elrod, who was married at the time to Red Sophia.
Roach (Artemis)
An incompetent superhero character. Sim used the Roach to satirize popular mainstream comic characters or industry publishing trends, beginning with Batman. His other guises have included Captain Cockroach (Captain America), Moonroach (Moon Knight), Wolveroach (Wolverine), the Secret Sacred Wars Roach (Marvel Super Heroes Secret Wars series and Frank Miller's Batman from The Dark Knight Returns), normalroach (Valentino's normalman), Punisheroach (the Punisher), Swoon (The Sandman), and Sergeant Preston of the Royal Mounted Iestan police (the main character of the radio series Challenge of the Yukon).
Adam Weisshaupt
Introduced in Cerebus, he is a ruthless political opponent of Cerebus throughout the Church & State storyline. His manipulations of both Cerebus and the Roach lead to his pawns eventually growing more powerful than he ever hoped to be. Weisshaupt is named after the historical Adam Weishaupt but drawn to look like George Washington (a connection well known to Illuminati conspiracy theorists).
Bear
Cerebus's best friend from his mercenary days and main drinking buddy. In "Guys" there are hints Cerebus is suppressing an attraction to him.
Joanne
Introduced in a possible future for Cerebus and Jaka by "Dave" in "Minds", Joanne is a bored housewife who has an affair with Cerebus, prompting Jaka's suicide. After Cerebus returns to Estarcion, Joanne reappears and becomes Cerebus's lover, only to be spurned by Cerebus. She later seduces Rick as a way to taunt Cerebus. Joanne is in many ways an opposite of Jaka, and Cerebus bases much of his post-Guys views on how to deal with women on his experience with her. After Shep-shep's mother leaves Cerebus, he labels her "New Joanne".
Bran Mac Mufin
Originally a barbarian warlord whose people worshiped an idol who looked remarkably like Cerebus (and which the aardvark destroyed). He later turns up quite unexpectedly, in civilized clothing, to act as an adviser to Cerebus in two separate occasions, first in Cerebus's campaign and first reign as Prime Minister of Iest and then arriving after Cerebus is pope to observe the miracles and give Cerebus advice, though he seems to have a hidden agenda. During the Iest campaign Cerebus states that he trusts Mac Mufin's military advice more than anyone else's. When Thrunk deposes Cerebus, Mac Mufin commits suicide by stabbing himself in the chest with a sword. Mac Mufin is a parody of Robert E. Howard's Celtic barbarian Bran Mak Morn. In his first appearance in issue #5 his name was spelled Bran Mak Mufin, but in subsequent appearances he goes by Bran Mac Mufin.
Rick Nash
First introduced as Jaka's husband in Jaka's Story, Rick is a friendly, gentle ne'er-do-well, whom Sim described in the introduction to the "phonebook" of Jaka's Story as "the nearest I will ever come to the portrayal of a good and thoroughly decent human being; completely without guile or malice". After his marriage to Jaka is dissolved, he becomes mildly insane. He eventually goes on to become the prophet of a religion centered on Cerebus.
Suenteus Po
Estarcion's third aardvark, who has lived several lifetimes and has shaped the history of Estarcion. It is also a very common name and several people named "Suenteus Po" appear in the story in various roles—one as an enigmatic illusionist and another as a historian who narrates a sizable portion of Cerebus's first reign as Prime Minister of Iest (though it is very strongly implied that both these Pos are the aardvark). It is mentioned in High Society that some of the followers of the original Suenteus Po named their children after him. The name may be a playful misspelling of the name of Roman historian Suetonius. There was a rock band on San Francisco label Solana Records named Suenteus Po that released an album in 2000.
The Regency Elf
A childlike, playful spirit who inhabits Cerebus's rooms at the Regency Hotel in High Society; at first, only Cerebus can see her. She helps Cerebus with some of his political scheming, though, as innocent as she seems, it's all just a game to her. It is discovered later that the Regency Elf who appears to Cerebus is a fake created by Cerebus's subconscious. The Regency Elf is inspired in part by Elfquest and its creator Wendy Pini. Visually, the Regency Elf is inspired by Debbie Harry.

Various other characters in the series were designed to resemble famous actors, politicians, and other personalities and comic in-jokes, including British prime minister Margaret Thatcher, Professor X (with a bit of Chris Claremont thrown in), Canadian Member of Parliament Sheila Copps, director Woody Allen, Alan Moore, Rick Veitch, Oscar Wilde, F. Scott Fitzgerald, Ernest Hemingway, Norman Mailer, Rodney Dangerfield, Mick Jagger, Keith Richards, and Chico Marx.

== Collected editions ==
The first 25 issues of Cerebus were collected in six issues of Swords of Cerebus, plus one supplement to vol. 6, and these stories were then collected in the Cerebus trade paperback. Swords of Cerebus also published several new short Cerebus stories, listed under "Other appearances" above, which were not reprinted in the "phone books"

All of the story arcs from the Cerebus comic book have been reprinted in collected omnibus editions of 240–630 pages each, all of which are presently still in print. They are generally referred to by fans and retailers as Cerebus "phone books" due to their size; also, they use the same newsprint paper as the original comics.

Sim has released two collections of his responses to readers' letters (the original letters are not included) after the publication of Cerebus #300. Collected Letters 2004 (ISBN 0-919359-23-X) was released in 2005, and Collected Letters vol. 2 was released in 2007 (ISBN 0919359248).

Miscellaneous stories not appearing in the above collections have been reprinted in the short collections Cerebus World Tour Book and in Cerebus Number Zero, which reprints Issues #51, #112/#113 and parts of issues #137–138. A few standalone, uncollected stories have appeared in various collections and magazines over the years, and Cerebus has made cameo appearances on the covers of magazines such as Comics Revue. Sim also marketed a set of "Diamondback" cards (based upon a game seen in early issues) in the 1980s. All of the material in the Cerebus arc was reprinted in smaller collections called Swords of Cerebus before Sim decided on the "phonebook" format.

The phonebooks themselves tie into ideas presented in the series. Although grammatically incorrect, the titles of books 8 through 11 could be read as a sentence ("women read minds, guys"—the concept of women reading minds is a key plot point). Also, beginning with Going Home (the first storyline begun after Sim's religious conversion), the covers of each "phone book" are printed in full color, with Going Home and Form and Void using Gerhard's scenic nature photography as covers, rather than the drawings used on past books.

=== Novels and collections ===
#	Title	Issues	Orig. dates	Storyline	Year	ISBN	Notes
1	Cerebus	1–25	1977–1981	Cerebus	1987	0-919359-08-6	Third published volume From 11th printing, also contains "Silverspoon" strips
2	High Society	26–50	1981–1983	High Society	1986	0-919359-07-8	First published volume
3	Church and State I	52–80	1983–1985	Church & State	1987	0-919359-09-4	Second published volume
4	Church and State II	81–111	1985–1988	Church & State	1988	0-919359-11-6	
5	Jaka's Story	114–136	1988–1990	Jaka's Story	1990	0-919359-12-4	
6	Melmoth	139–150	1990–1991	Melmoth	1991	0-919359-10-8	
7	Flight	151–162	1991–1992	Mothers & Daughters	1993	0-919359-13-2	first volume published with a volume number
8	Women	163–174	1992–1993	Mothers & Daughters	1994	0-919359-14-0	
9	Reads	175–186	1993–1994	Mothers & Daughters	1995	0-919359-15-9	
10	Minds	187–200	1994–1995	Mothers & Daughters	1996	0-919359-16-7	
11	Guys	201–219	1995–1997	Guys	1997	0-919359-17-5	
12	Rick's Story	220–231	1997–1998	Rick's Story	1998	0-919359-18-3	
13	Going Home	232–250	1998–2000	Going Home	2000	0-919359-19-1	
14	Form and Void	251–265	2000–2001	Going Home	2001	0-919359-20-5	
15	Latter Days	266–288	2001–2003	Latter Days	2003	0-919359-22-1	
16	The Last Day	289–300	2003–2004	Latter Days	2004	0-919359-21-3	

== Reception and legacy ==
Cerebus has been rated to be one of the greatest characters in comics history. Wizard rated him as the 63rd-greatest comic book character, while Empire rated him as the 38th-greatest comic book character, describing him as a character born of bizarre brilliance. IGN placed Cerebus as the 91st-greatest comic book hero of all time, stating that "few names hold as much sway in the independent comics scene as Cerebus" and "Cerebus' mark on the industry will be everlasting".

The term "Cerebus syndrome" has come to commonly describe developments where initially comedic or superficial works in any medium gradually become more serious, complex, and dramatic.

Over a decade after the end of the comic book series, an author named Michael Fryar published a science fiction novel titled Wasted Genius: A Flaherty Story which features Cerebus as a character.
