= Glamourpuss (comics) =

Canadian independent comic book by Dave Sim

glamourpuss

Publication information
- Publisher: Aardvark-Vanaheim
- Schedule: Bimonthly
- Publication date: 2008 – 2012
- No. of issues: 26
- Main character(s): glamourpuss Skanko; Dr. Norm

Creative team
- Created by: Dave Sim
- Written by: Dave Sim
- Artist: Dave Sim
- Penciller: Dave Sim
- Inker: Dave Sim

Glamourpuss (stylized as glamourpuss) is a Canadian independent comic book written and illustrated by Dave Sim which was published from April 2008 to July 2012 and ran for 26 issues. The comic was published bimonthly, with 24 pages of story and art, and back issues remaining available throughout the comic's print run. The premise of the book is threefold: a parody of fashion magazines, a history of photorealism in comics, and a surreal super-heroine comic.

One of the stories within Glamourpuss, about the death of comic illustrator Alex Raymond, remained uncompleted at the time of the last issue, and plans to release The Strange Death of Alex Raymond were briefly cancelled. In early 2021, it was announced that the completed book (finished by co-illustrator Carson Grubaugh) would be released in September of that year.

Issue #4 (November 2008) and #5 (January 2009) of the book were offered with "Zombie" variant covers, featuring "zombie-fied" covers instead of the traditional fashion magazine versions. Issue #18 (March 2011) featured the first new Cerebus comic book story in seven years, the ten page "What If Cerebus had Lived in the Age of Mad Men." Issues #22–26 (re-numbered #1–5) were offered with "Zootanapuss" variant covers, autographed and numbered by Sim.

== Characters ==
- glamourpuss – The heroine of the comic.
- Skanko – glamourpuss' evil twin sister.
- Dr. Norm – glamourpuss' long-time therapist.
