= Church and State (comics) =

Church & State
- Cover to the first volume of Church & State (Aardvark Vanaheim, 1987)
- Series: Cerebus
- Publisher: Aardvark-Vanaheim

Creative team
- Writer: Dave Sim
- Artists: Dave Sim; Gerhard

Original publication
- Published in: Cerebus
- Issues: 52–111
- Date of publication: July 1983 to June 1988
- ISBN: 0-919359-09-4 (Vol. I); 0-919359-08-6 (Vol. II)

Chronology
- Preceded by: High Society (1986)
- Followed by: Jaka's Story (1990)

Church & State is the third novel in Canadian cartoonist Dave Sim's Cerebus comic book series. In it, Cerebus once again becomes Prime Minister, and eventually Pope. The story was published in individual issues from July 1983 (issue #52) to June 1988 (#111).

The 1200-page novel was divided into seven books has been collected in two volumes. Church and State I (June 1987, 592 pages ISBN 0-919359-09-4) collects Books One through Three (Cerebus #52-80); and Church and State II (July 1988, 630 pages ISBN 0-919359-08-6) collects Book Four through Seven (Cerebus #81-111), and starts with page 595, emphasizing Sim's intention that the two volumes make up one novel.

== Background ==
In High Society, Cerebus rose to power, with the help of Astoria, in the city-state of Iest, eventually becoming prime minister. His brief time in power came to an end and he made his way away from the city.

== Synopsis ==
The novel is divided into seven parts:

=== Apres State ===
(Cerebus #52-55)

Cerebus, while writing his memoirs, is interrupted by Lord Julius' son Lord Silverspoon and two companions. After playing (and losing) a "cute" game of cards with them, Cerebus loses his temper and scares them off. Later, they hunt him down again, accidentally letting it known that the Countess Michelle Detin, with whom they planned to stay, will only let them come if they bring Cerebus. Cerebus manages to scam the trio out of the money that the countess sent them, as well as the rest of the money they had, and travels to the Countess's mansion alone.

The Countess lives alone—the Count is dead, and the Countess has no need for servants. Cerebus decides to stay and finish his memoirs, while the Countess tries to get information out of him about what he's writing. His answers are very terse and to-the-point. Her questioning is cut off with the sudden, dramatic appearance of whom the Countess calls "Uncle Artemis"—the Roach, this time in the garb of the Wolveroach, a parody of the Marvel Comics character Wolverine, who announces the beginning of a three-part miniseries on the origin of the Wolveroach (also a parody of 1980s superhero comics trends).

Weisshaupt and the Countess have long known each other. The Countess had helped out Weisshaupt by helping Artemis build himself up into Captain Cockroach, but when Weisshaupt had been run out of Beduin, Artemis had nowhere to turn, so the Countess took him in. At some point, Astoria came to stay. She befriended the Roach, and made use of him as Moon Roach until Cerebus entered the picture in High Society. After Cerebus fell from power, Artemis returned to Michelle. As this is all being related by the Countess, Weisshaupt barges in, again with his grandiose plans for a United Feldwar States, using the Wolveroach as a hero for the masses, and with the hopes of getting Cerebus to become Prime Minister again, which Cerebus refuses.

After scrapping with a group of soldiers, Cerebus finds the Roach in the Countess Michelle's basement. Professor Charles X. Claremont is using the Roach's body as a host for his spirit, as his own body was destroyed by his Apocalypse Beasts. Cerebus and Michelle's relationship becomes strained, and Cerebus decides to make a stand by moving on. Michelle gives him a pouch with a thousand crowns in it, and he makes off.

=== Back to Iest ===
(Cerebus #56-63)

Cerebus wakes up, seemingly after a bender, to find himself in bed with Red Sophia. He has been drugged by Weisshaupt and married to Sophia. Divorce is illegal, except by the permission of the President—Weisshaupt himself. Cerebus agrees to become Prime Minister again and do Weisshaupt's bidding in order to be granted (eventually) a divorce from Sophia. The marriage is stormy, especially between Cerebus and Mrs. Henrot-Gutch—a "vicious, old, fat, ugly woman" who is Sophia's mother and Henrot's ex-wife.

Cerebus and Sophia move back into the Regency, and Cerebus meets up again with the Regency Elf. Cerebus is a mere puppet of Weisshaupt, even more so than he had been with Astoria. Cerebus is summoned to Pope Harmony IV, who babbles incoherently about Cerebus, Weisshaupt, Cirin, Lord Julius and others, and claims that Cirin, not Weisshaupt, will triumph. Harmony reveals that he is a Cirinist, and is shot down with a crossbow by a man in the employ of the mysterious Lion of Serrea.

Bishop Powers demands Weisshaupt for a new candidate for Pope, but Weisshaupt bluffs the Bishop, who leaves with a candidate. After getting overly drunk one night, Cerebus discovers that Powers has nominated him for Pope.

=== Church & State ===
Cerebus is appointed Pope of East Iest, where he immediately becomes drunk with power. His first act is to demand all of the citizens give him all of the gold in the kingdom, lest Tarim destroy the world. Sophia and her mother are moved to a house near the Pope's residence, where they are kept under house arrest. To persuade the public to obey his greed driven demand, Cerebus murders a child handed to him to be blessed and later, an elderly man who beggared his family in order to give Cerebus his family's life savings.

Cerebus's reign however provides him with little comfort, leading to him ordering Jaka located and taken to him. As he is now a Pope, Cerebus can divorce Sophia at his leisure to marry Jaka. But Jaka reveals that she is now married and expecting a child; more importantly, she no longer loves Cerebus due to him not returning to her following the events of "High Society".

Sophia meanwhile leaves her guest house prison, when Cerebus ends up falling through a wall and getting stuck. She informs Cerebus that she is leaving him and that she can divorce him if he wishes to, having realized Cerebus does not love her.

Cerebus takes comfort in his house filled with sacks of gold, but soon finds it coveted by a rival Pope; a giant stone golem which attacks Cerebus's home. As Bran commits suicide rather than suffer a horrific death, Cerebus is flung to the lower city.

=== The Sacred Wars ===
Cerebus struggles to return to Iest, before the rival pope can melt all of his ill-gotten gold into a giant throne. Along the way, he encounters The Roach (now dressed in a black Spider-Man costume, with two henchmen dressed in white Spider-Man costumes) and Elrod (dressed in a giant plush roach costume). The four men are engaged in attacks on locals, as part of the "Sacred Wars"; from Elrod, Cerebus learned of Weisshaupt's plans for "The Ascension"; a religious ritual that happens once a century where whoever holds a magic golden orb, is taken to the moon on a pillar of skulls, to meet Tarim.

Cerebus attempts to get the four to join him in fighting the giant but fails to, as they are too concerned with "protecting" local villages on the far end of Iest from Cirinist raiding parties (though in truth, the four have taken a town hostage as their base of operations). However, as he reaches his home, Cerebus is confronted by Elrod, who has agreed to come join him. Elrod is swatted aside by the giant, but buys Cerebus time to arm a cannon at the palace, which he uses to kill the giant.

While celebrating his victory, Cerebus is confronted by an angry Astoria, who is furious that Cerebus has returned.

=== Astoria ===
Cerebus orders Roach arrested for his refusal to help Cerebus. Though the Roach escapes, before he goes he reveals that Astoria is the one who murdered the previous Pope in order to arrange Cerebus's appointment to the position. Put into the dungeon, Astoria reveals that she manipulated Cerebus to counter Weisshaupt 's own schemes to carry out the Ascension. Astoria seeks to be the one who is summoned to the moon, so she can meet Tarim (who Astoria refers to as "Terim" and considers a woman) so that she can ask to be his prophet and end the religious war that exists between her Kevillists sect and the Cirinists in her side's favor.

During her interrogation, Cerebus "marries" Astoria, then has sex with her and then "divorces" her, before taking Astoria to trial for murder of the previous pope. During the trial, Astoria uses previously never mentioned before psychic powers to make Cerebus think the roles of the two were switched to try and gain pity from Cerebus. However, the trial is interrupted when the tower that will lead whoever possesses the golden orb to the moon, manifests. Using the orb that Cerebus has found in Weisshaupt's bedroom, Cerebus is forced to leave Astoria's punishment in the hands of a subordinate as he rushes to catch the start of the ascension.

=== The Final Ascension ===
(Cerebus #102-106)

The Tower is spinning, breaking away and rising away. Cerebus, clutching the golden sphere, is holding on desperately while being watched by everybody, from the Cirinist Abbes far away with a viewing device, to those living in the Upper and Lower Cities of Iest. Eventually Cerebus gets his bearings and makes his way up the inside of the Tower. Whether real or imagined, he keeps coming across the face of Weisshaupt. In a rare crossover, Flaming Carrot comes to his rescue and leads him to the top of the tower, when he comes across Fred, Ethel and the "Fellow with the Hair", who knocks Cerebus' gold sphere off the Tower, and tries to knock Cerebus off, too. The Tower grows narrower and narrower until the top eventually breaks off, and the three-headed creature plummets towards the Earth, leaving Cerebus alone to complete the Final Ascension.

=== Walking on the Moon ===
(Cerebus #107-11)

Cerebus crash lands on the Moon and discovers there, not Tarim, as he had expected, but a balding, moustachioed man dressed as a judge. He explains to Cerebus that he has been on the moon for aeons, watching the Earth, from the time of sentient, walking redwoods and the time of dinosaurs to the present day. He is disappointed that Cerebus succeeded at the Ascension rather than Weisshaupt.

Cerebus is unable to speak on the airless moon, but the Judge answers his questions nonetheless—for example, he assures Cerebus that he will not, in fact, conquer the known world. The Judge goes on at length about the history of Suenteus Po, most of which Cerebus misses as he wanders off around the moon. The Judge then goes on to explain to Cerebus the nature of Tarim, the Void, and male deity, who the Judge tells Cerebus is real, as is Terim, the Light, who the Cirinists worship and who Cerebus believed didn't exist. The Big Bang was a result of their meeting. Now, the Light is slowly coming back, and the Void is awaiting her arrival—"Part of the void plans their reunion and part of the void plots his revenge".

This is followed up with an accurate description of the space race that happened in the real world, and concludes in an undisclosed future with the destruction of the sun at the push of a button. As for Cerebus, while he has been on the moon, his deadline for the end of the world has come and gone without incident; his followers have left him; the Cirinists have invaded Lower Felda and Iest, and taken all of Cerebus' gold. Cerebus himself will live only a few more years. He will "die alone, unmourned and unloved", and if he ever thinks his fate is unfair, he is told to remember his second marriage.

== Characters ==
Michele
Bishop Powers
Boobah
Mick and Keef
Caricatures of Mick Jagger and Keith Richards of the Rolling Stones.
The Judge
Drawn to look like Lou Jacobi's character Judge Stern in the film version of Jules Feiffer's play Little Murders.

== Controversy ==
Sim drew the ire of many readers over certain scenes in Church & State, notably when Cerebus threw a baby from the steps of the hotel before a crowd of followers, and more infamously when Cerebus raped Astoria while she was in prison chained to a wall.

== Publication ==
Originally published in issues #52-111 of Sim's monthly Cerebus series from July 1983 to June 1988, Church and State was published as two paperback "phone book" collections: Church and State I in June 1987, and Church and State II in July 1988. The novel was sandwiched between two issues (#51 and the #112/113 double issue) that have not been collected in the series of "phone book" collections, although Sim considers 112/113 to be an epilogue to Church & State.

Sim was sent a cease and desist order by Marvel Comics over the Wolveroach, his parody of Marvel's popular Wolverine character, although they had never given Sim any trouble over his parodies of Marvel's Captain America or Moon Knight.

Sim's artistic partner, Gerhard joined him starting with issue #66, and therefore was a major contributor to most of the novel.

=== Cerebus 112/113: Square One ===
After spending five years on Church & State, Sim and Gerhard took a few weeks off. Sim decided they would do a double issue between Church & State and Jaka's Story, as they would only have to do one front and back cover, and one letters page.

The story is mostly done in pantomime, and thus is a very quick read. Cerebus returns to the hotel he had used when he was Pope, and finds it destroyed and deserted. He explores the area, coming across a note from Boobah and the fly-ridden, rotting corpse of Bran Mak Muffin. Remembering the Judge's last words to him, he contemplates suicide, but stops himself. He falls asleep outside, but after a dream sequence returns to the hotel to sleep. In the morning he finds a single gold coin, which he takes with him. He leaves the hotel, and while making his way down the mountain comes across a tavern whose single patron is griping about the conditions under Cirinist rule. When the patron asks when it when all end, Cerebus informs the patron (as the Judge had informed Cerebus): "Someone pushes a button and blows up the sun", and continues down towards the Lower City.

The July/August issue was released in August, 1988, and provided what Sim agrees is an epilogue to the Church & State story. The fact this was combined into one issue rather than printed separately means that technically, there's only 299 issues of actual issues Cerebus rather than the official 300. Sim says he had talked to his printer about including it in later printings of Church & State Volume II, but the binding would have been too strained if an extra 40 pages were added to what is already the thickest of the Cerebus "phonebooks". As of 2011, the story has yet to be collected with the rest of the series, although it has been collected with the other in-between issues in Cerebus Number Zero.

== Artwork ==
Gerhard, who used to deliver art supplies to Sim, did backgrounds and colours for the stories Sim had been commissioned to do for Epic Illustrated. Due to the success of the stories, Sim asked him to take over the duty of drawing backgrounds and laying down screentone for Cerebus starting with issue #66.

For the first several issues together, Gerhard experimented with different techniques and textures, trying to find out what style would both mesh well with Sim's, and reproduce correctly when printed. He experimented with laying two layers of screentone on top of each other, crosshatching over stippled screentone, stippled screentone over crosshatching—adding and discarding different tricks until he had a repertoire that worked.

== Reception ==
The end of Church & State was met quietly. Sim said, "Virtually no mail came for a month or two." Heidi MacDonald ran a review that called the ending "too darn cosmic"—a comment Sim found "moronic[...]in a medium where the blowing up of the universe and getting superpowers from radioactivity are the norm rather than the exception."

== Foreign editions ==
Language	Title	Publisher	Date	Translator	ISBN	Notes
Spanish	Iglesia y Estado I	Ponent Mon	2011	Andrés Moon	978-1-908-00707-0	Hardcover
Italian	Chiesa & Stato I	Black Velvet Editrice	2011	Francesco Matteuzzi	978-8-896-19751-6	Hardcover
