= Trade paperback (comics) =

Comic books reprinted in book form

In comics in the United States, a trade paperback (shortened: TPB or trade) is a collection of stories originally published in comic books, reprinted in book format, usually presenting either a complete miniseries, a story arc from a single title, or a series of stories with an arc or common theme.

A trade paperback may reproduce the stories either at the same size in which they were originally presented (in comic book format), in a smaller "digest-sized" format, or a larger-than-original hardcover. This article applies to both paperback and hardcover collections. In the comics industry, the term "trade paperback market" may refer to the market for any collection, regardless of its actual cover.

A trade paperback differs from a graphic novel in that a graphic novel is usually original material. It is also different from the publishing term trade paperback, which is a book with a flexible cardstock cover that is larger than the standard mass market paperback format.

== History ==
For many years, trade paperbacks were mainly used to reprint older comic-book stories that were no longer available to the average reader. Original copies of those stories were scarce, and often very expensive when found due to their rarity. In 1954, "the first mass-market paperback reprints of American comic book material" began with "The MAD Reader, published by Ballantine Books". The reprint collections of Mad in the late 1950s and early 1960s increased their popularity. In the 1960s and 1970s, Marvel Comics (first through Lancer Books and then through the Fireside Books imprint) published trade paperbacks which were collections around specific themes such as battles, villains and individual characters. After Marvel's success with their Fireside Books collections, DC Comics began publishing similar themed collections through Warner Books. In 1981, the Great Superman Comic Book Collection was "the first DC comic book collection in the modern tradition". Paul Levitz of Vulture commented that "these collections of reprints were united by their title character or series but only accidentally had any commonality of story or theme, and their existence as books was clearly an afterthought".

The growth of trade paperbacks and graphic novels in the 1980s allowed smaller publishers to flourish. In 1981, Warp Graphics's Elfquest series "landed in bookstores" as full color trade paperback collections – "it was the first graphic novel series to push its way out of the comic book marketplace". The success of series such as Mirage Studios' Teenage Mutant Ninja Turtles and Dave Sim's Cerebus showed that "readers were interested in bound comic book collections, whether they were called phone books, comic book novels, albums or graphic novels".

In 1984, Marvel shifted from trade paperbacks which were general collections to trade paperbacks which were notable recent runs such as the "Dark Phoenix Saga" and "The Power of Iron Man". Similarly, trade paperbacks were a "minor endeavor" for DC "until 1986's collection of The Dark Knight Returns". Brian Cronin, for CBR, highlighted that The Dark Knight Returns trade "was a true game-changer. The crux of the great Alan Moore/DC Comics feud is that Moore's deal with DC for Watchmen said that Moore and Dave Gibbons would get the rights to the characters once the book went out of print. At the time that Moore signed the deal, which was [before] the Dark Knight Returns was collected, the idea of a comic book staying in print was absurd. Well, by the time that Watchmen was finished, Dark Knight Returns was a sensation as a trade paperback and naturally, DC gave Watchmen the same treatment [...] and it's never been out of print since". The Dark Knight Returns, Watchmen, and Art Spiegelman's Maus (published as a collection in 1986 by Pantheon Books) "established a beachhead for 'graphic novels' in the book trade".

In the 1990s, "trade paperbacks found their popularity boom". Comic book publishers began releasing trade paperbacks of collected story arcs directly after those stories' original periodical publication, because a new reader could purchase the trade paperbacks and access the entire series' stories to date. The Librarian's Guide to Graphic Novels for Children and Tweens by David S. Serchay explains: "At first it was the most popular stories that were being collected, but more and more comic book stories are now being put into trade, sometimes less than two months after the 'newest' issue is sold. And [...] not only recent material but a great deal of older material is finally being collected into trades". In 2015, Polygon highlighted that "though this was far less common a decade ago, pretty much every monthly comic out there right now is eventually collected into trade paperback or hardcover edition that prints several issues in one package".

== Additions and omissions ==
Author David S. Serchay wrote that with books "trades have an International Standard Book Number (ISBN) and a spine and come in a variety of sizes. In some cases, the pages of the trade are larger or smaller than they were in the original comic book". A trade paperback will sometimes feature additional artwork, such as alternative cover art, pinup galleries by guest artists, or additional story material that had not been released in the standard issues. A common practice is to include an art gallery featuring the artwork of the original comic book covers from which the series was compiled. Many feature introductions written by prominent figures, some from outside the world of comics—for instance, The Sandman: Worlds' End features an introduction by Stephen King, the Ultimates 2 book has an introduction by Jonathan Ross and most Hellboy trade paperbacks have included introductions by prominent authors.

Trade paperbacks generally do not feature advertisements, fan mail, or special foil or embossed covers. "Back-up" stories not related to the main arc may also be omitted, and in older trade paperbacks it was common practice to omit pages from the main story related to other subplots.

== Readers and sales ==
Since trade paperbacks may be less expensive and more convenient than buying the individual periodicals, readers may forgo purchasing individual issues in favor of the trade. A significant benefit of the trade paperback version is that it is often available in bookstores, from smaller booksellers to the larger suppliers, and other retailers that do not normally carry comic books. Despite the growing popularity of the trade paperback, the serialized, individual issues are still considered the primary mode of sale by comics publishers, and a poorly selling series may face cancellation irrespective of trade paperback sales. However, some series, such as Ms. Marvel and Moon Girl and Devil Dinosaur, "survive on the popularity of their trades sales, not just in the direct market and local comic shops, but in book stores across the world" and at "Scholastic [book] fairs and the like". Other times a series might be relaunched after cancellation, such as Iceman and The Unstoppable Wasp in 2018, if the series has good trade sales.

In 2018, Screen Rant highlighted that "publishers and retailers traditionally ignore the sales of trade paperbacks when it comes to deciding whether or not a specific title is doing well. For decades, the single issue has been king, even though those sales figures are far from helpful. [...] Trade paperbacks are increasingly important as a marker of what sells, with 2016 seeing a 12% jump in trade sales over 2015 - a period when single issue sales fell. Even 2017, which saw both trades and single issue sales fall compared to 2016, trades were down 9.38%, compared to single issues dropping 10.4%". In 2019, Bleeding Cool emphasized that "in recent years, collected issues/trade paperbacks are more popular and profitable than monthly comic book periodicals. As single issue sales have consistently plummeted, trade paperbacks and graphic novels have filled in the gaps. From 2013 to 2018, graphic novels were the highest-selling format for comic books". According to industry reports, "the massive shift to graphic novels as the preferred format for comics continued in 2019 bringing sales in the book channel above the comic store channel in North America for the first time in the history of the medium" and that "the sales of graphic novels were growing faster in the book trade than in comics shops".

Trade paperbacks and graphic novels are the preferred format for circulating library collections, since these collections are created to be read, and not to be retained as collector's items or as investments. Attempts to catalogue and circulate single-issue comics can pose difficult problems and the durability of the trade paperback format is an important consideration for longevity and collection development in public and school libraries. Trade paperbacks "are also the primary culprit in people's confusion of the lexicon, since 'TPBs make up 95% of what many librarians refer to as graphic novels'".

== See also ==
- Graphic novel
- Limited series
- Omnibus edition
- Tankōbon
