= Gerhard (cartoonist) =

Canadian artist

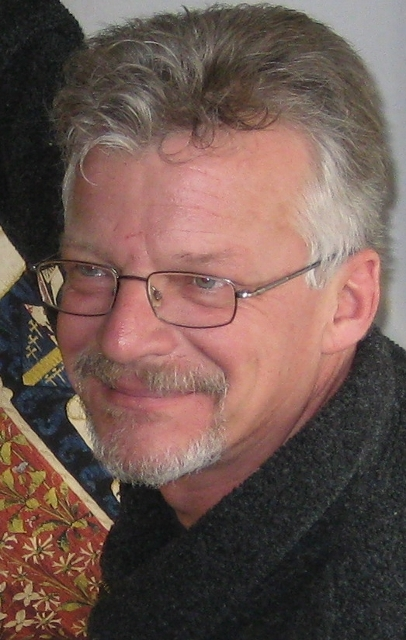
- Gerhard in 2012
- Born: April 14, 1959 (age 67) Edmonton, Alberta, Canada
- Area: Artist
- Notable works: Cerebus
- Collaborators: Dave Sim
- Awards: Joe Shuster Award (2005, Outstanding Achievement)

Gerhard is the professional name of a Canadian artist, best known for drawing the elaborately detailed background and settings in the comics series Cerebus the Aardvark.

== Biography ==
Gerhard was born on April 14, 1959, in Edmonton, Alberta. His association with Dave Sim's Cerebus began with issue #65 (August 1984), and continued through its conclusion in issue #300, in March, 2004. The series was written by Dave Sim, who also drew the foreground figures, and had worked on the self-published series largely solo for the first 64 issues. In 2005, Gerhard and Sim received the Joe Shuster Award for Outstanding Achievement for completing Cerebus the previous year.

Gerhard jokingly described his job saying that he "draws tables and chairs behind an aardvark". He is also fond of photography and sailing. Later issues of the comic book have covers based on his scenic photos.

In 2007, three years after finishing his work on Cerebus, Gerhard ended his professional and personal relationship with Dave Sim. Subsequently, Sim was arranging to purchase Gerhard's share of Aardvark-Vanaheim.

Although most associated with Cerebus, Gerhard has produced works for other publications, although mostly with Sim. In September 1994, however, he worked with Stephen R. Bissette on the cover to Bissette's Tyrant #1, and coloured Sim's back cover for Oni Press's Free Speeches #1 (August 1998).
