= Dave Sim =

Canadian cartoonist and publisher (born 1956)

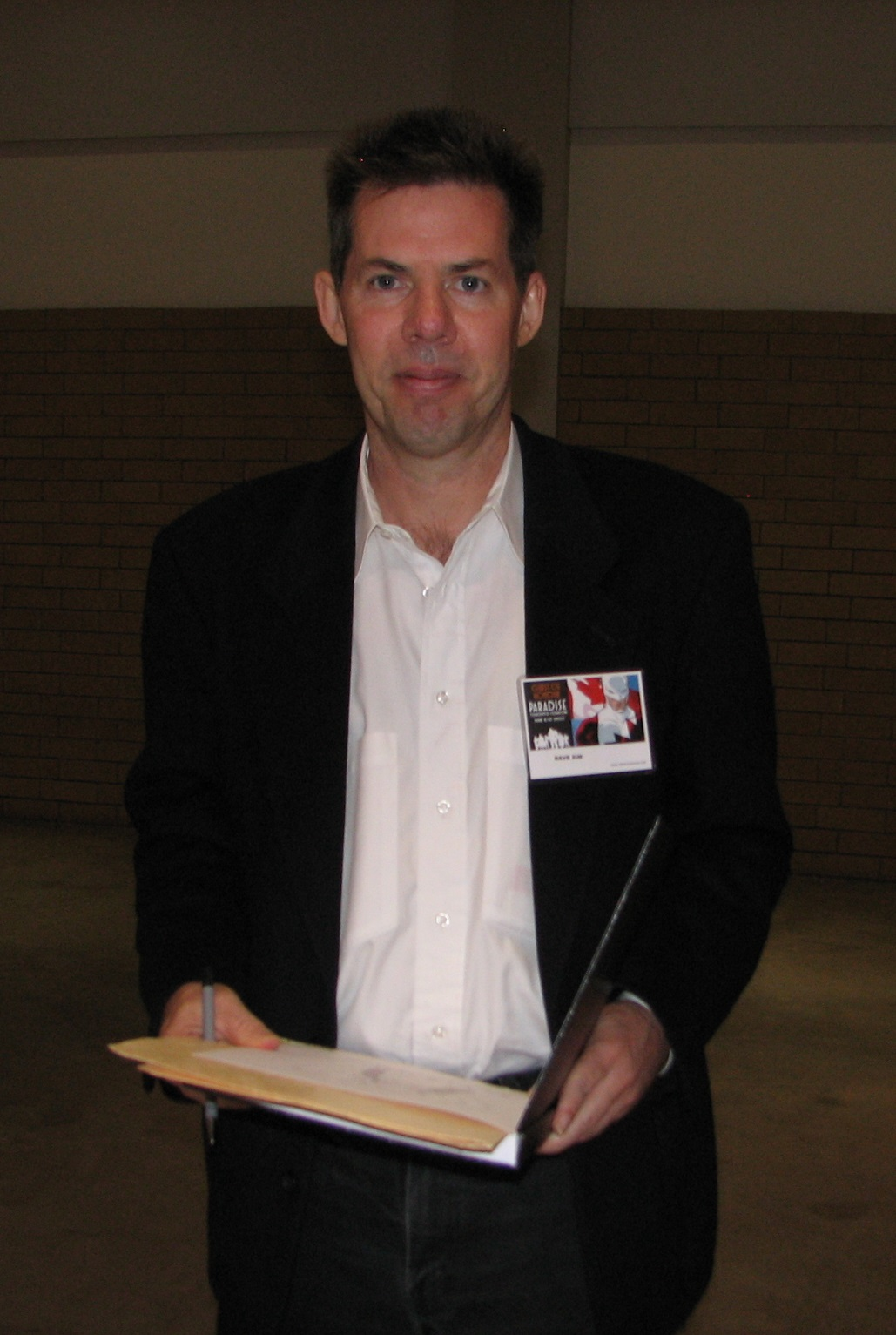
- Sim at Paradise Comics Toronto Comicon 2007
- Born: May 17, 1956 (age 70) Hamilton, Ontario, Canada
- Areas: Cartoonist, Writer, Artist, Publisher, Letterer
- Notable works: Cerebus
- Collaborators: Gerhard
- Awards: Inkpot Award (1981)
- Spouse: Deni Loubert (m. 1978; div. 1983)

Dave Sim (born 17 May 1956) is a Canadian cartoonist and publisher, known for his comic book Cerebus, his artistic experimentation, his advocacy of self-publishing and creators' rights, and his controversial political and philosophical beliefs.

Born in Hamilton, Ontario, Sim rose to prominence with Cerebus, which began in December 1977. Sim initially conceived it as a parody of Conan the Barbarian and other sword and sorcery comics, but after two years he began to consider the series a self-contained work that would run for 300 issues and be subdivided into novels. By the time the 6000-page work was completed in March 2004, Sim had delved into politics, and an examination of feminism and gender, while becoming progressively more sophisticated and experimental in his storytelling and artwork. Sim worked on Cerebus Archives afterward, and he produced the comic books Glamourpuss, which examines the history of photorealistic comics, and Judenhass, about the Holocaust.

Sim co-founded the small press publisher Aardvark-Vanaheim with his wife-to-be, Deni Loubert, in 1977. Most of the titles it published moved to Loubert's Renegade Press after the couple's divorce in the mid-1980s. The publishing company later was co-owned by Sim's creative partner, Gerhard, who dissolved their partnership and sold his stake in the company to Sim in 2007.

Sim helped create the Creator's Bill of Rights in 1988. He has criticized the use of copyright to restrict creators, and has arranged for his body of work to fall into the public domain following his death. Sim has already released one of his works, Judenhass, to the public domain.

== Early life ==
Sim was born on 17 May 1956. His father was a factory supervisor at Budd Automotive and worked as a labour negotiator.

Sim became interested in comic books when he was eight. He had a letter published in Iron Man #37 (May 1971). Bernie Wrightson's Badtime Stories (1971) inspired him to devote himself to drawing. Sim also found inspiration in Mad magazine, particularly Harvey Kurtzman and Wally Wood's "Superduperman" parody, as well as underground cartoonist Jack Jackson's Conan parody. He wrote and drew comics throughout his adolescence, and he began submitting work to fanzines. His first published work was some articles in the comics fanzine Rocket's Blast Comicollector. He had submitted artwork as well and, although it was rejected, Sim struck up a relationship with editor Gabe Quintanilla, who encouraged him to continue submitting material. Now & Then Books owner Harry Kremer allowed him to produce a newsletter called Now & Then Times. The first issue arrived in summer 1972. Sim produced another issue in 1973, but he had begun devoting his time to John Balge's Comic Art News and Reviews, another Canadian comics fanzine. For CANAR he interviewed subjects such as Barry Windsor-Smith.

Inspired by Charles Schulz's Peanuts and Outhouses of the North (a small book of cartoons published by the Highway Bookshop in northern Ontario), Sim spent 1975 and 1976 developing a comic strip called The Beavers. Highway Bookshop published the strip as a book in 1976. A second book failed to materialize when the publisher shut down. Sim then pursued syndication, pitching The Beavers to the Kitchener-Waterloo Record. With Day inking the strips, a year's worth was produced in three days. Sim also wrote or drew stories published in anthologies such as Phantacea and Star*Reach. The Beavers also saw print in Star*Reach's sister talking animals comic Quack!.

Around this time, Sim's work was published by Charlton Comics and Warren Publishing. In 1976, Sim took the only job he ever held outside of comics: an employee at Now & Then Books. He also wrote and drew parts of "Ali Baba" #1 for Gauntlet Comics.

== Career ==
=== Cerebus ===
In December 1977, Sim began publishing Cerebus, an initially bi-monthly, black-and-white comic book series. It began as a parodic cross between Conan the Barbarian and Howard the Duck. Progressively, Sim shifted his narrative style to story arcs of a few issues' length. Soon he moved to longer, far more complex "novels", beginning with the 25-issue storyline High Society which began in issue #26. The sword and sorcery elements in the series, prominent up to that point, were minimized as Sim concentrated more on politics.

Cerebus was published through Sim's company, Aardvark-Vanaheim, which was run by his wife, Deni Loubert. The two met in 1976, married in 1979, and divorced after nearly five years of marriage.

In 1979, during a time when he was taking large doses of LSD, Sim was hospitalized for treatment of schizophrenia-like symptoms.

"Arnold the Isshurian", a two-page parody of Conan and Little Nemo, ran in Epic Illustrated in February 1982.

Beginning with issue #65 (August 1984), Sim began collaborating with the artist Gerhard, who drew all the backgrounds while Sim, who continued to write the series himself, drew the foreground figures. Gerhard and Sim continued to work together on Cerebus until the series concluded with issue #300, in March 2004.

Although Sim did not maintain a consistent monthly schedule for the entire run, which at times required an accelerated production schedule to catch up, he completed the Cerebus series on schedule in March 2004. As the series progressed, it was noted for its tendency towards artistic experimentation. Sim has called the complete run of Cerebus a 6,000-page novel, a view shared by several academic writers and comics historians.

He purchased Gerhard's stake in Aardvark-Vanaheim and has made arrangements for the copyright of Cerebus to fall into the public domain following his death.

=== Post-Cerebus work ===
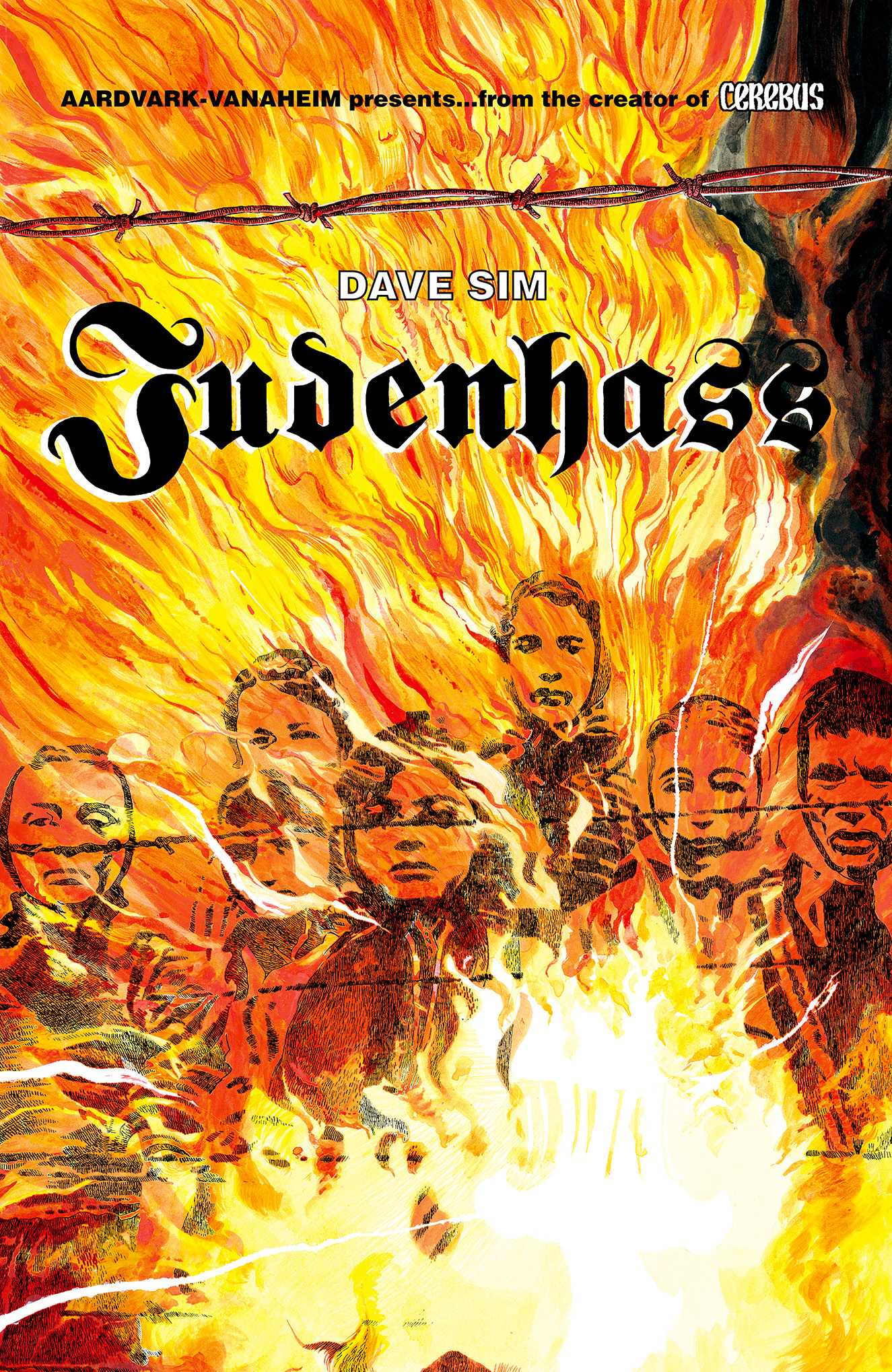
Front cover of Judenhass

Beginning in 2006, Sim began publishing an online comic-book biography of Canadian actress Siu Ta titled Siu Ta, So Far.

In late 2007, Sim announced two projects. One, which he initially referred to only as "Secret Project One", was Judenhass (German for "Jew hatred"), a 56-page "personal reflection on The Holocaust" which was released on May 28, 2008. The other is glamourpuss, a comic-book series which was a combined parody of fashion magazines (wherein Sim traces photos from real fashion magazines) and a historical study of the photorealist style of comic-strip art, for which he did a promotional "tour" of comics-related forums online in February 2008.

In 2009, Sim began publishing Cerebus Archive, a bimonthly presentation of his work before and surrounding Cerebus.

On October 23, 2009, the first episode of the web series Cerebus TV premiered. The show aired new episodes Fridays at 10 pm Eastern time, which then stream continuously throughout the week. Credits list Dave Sim as the executive producer. Sim was often the primary feature of the shows, either interviewing comics legends or showing behind the scenes at Aardvark-Vanaheim. As of early 2013, there were approximately 115 episodes of Cerebus TV.

In 2011, BOOM! Town announced that in 2012 it would publish Dave Sim's Last Girlfriend, a collection of letters between Dave Sim and Susan Alston originally intended for Denis Kitchen's Kitchen Sink Press. A collection of academic essays about Cerebus was published in 2012 by McFarland.

It appeared that the 2012 end of Glamourpuss would mean the end of The Strange Death of Alex Raymond, a running feature in that book. In 2013 it was announced IDW would publish the series in a reworked edition, as well as handle a number of other projects, including a Cerebus cover collection.

In 2001, Sim and his then-collaborator Gerhard founded the Howard E. Day Prize for outstanding achievement in self-publishing, in tribute to Sim's mentor, Gene Day. Bestowed annually at SPACE (Small Press and Alternative Comics Expo) in Columbus, Ohio from 2002 to 2008 the prize consisted of a $500 cash award and a commemorative plaque. The recipient was chosen by Sim and Gerhard from a pool of submitted works. Beginning in 2009, the Day Prize was replaced by the SPACE Prize.

In 2017, Cerebus returned in a series of one-shots collectively known as Cerebus in Hell? Presents. Each title presented as a #1.

In 2020, Sim ceased work on The Strange Death of Alex Raymond. His collaborator on the project, Carson Grubaugh, finished and published the work, which saw release in 2021 through Living the Line.

== Influence ==
Sim's use of an extended, multi-layered storytelling canvas, divided in large arcs divided in mostly self-contained issues, was acknowledged by J. Michael Straczynski as his inspiration for the structure of Babylon 5. Neil Gaiman named Sim as one of his two biggest influences within comics.

== Controversies ==
=== Creators' rights ===
During the 1980s and early 1990s, Sim used his sales leverage from Cerebus to act as a major proponent and advocate of creators' rights and self-publishing. After the Puma Blues distribution incident, he helped write the Creators' Bill of Rights along with Kevin Eastman, Peter Laird, and Scott McCloud. In addition to speaking on these topics at comic book conventions (as in his 1993 PRO/con speech), Sim also published the seminal The Cerebus Guide to Self-Publishing in 1997, which instructed readers on the practical matters of how to successfully self-publish their own comics, and which promoted other creators' fledgling work.

Sim has criticized the use of copyrights to restrict the use of creations which would have more quickly become public domain under earlier copyright law. He has stated that other creators are free to use his characters in their own works, which he characterizes as an attempt to be consistent with his own appropriation of others' works.

=== Views on women ===
In the course of writing Cerebus, Sim expressed opposition to feminism and made controversial statements regarding men and women. Sim expressed his views on gender in issue #186 of Cerebus, in a text piece as part of the story arc "Reads" (one of four books in the larger "Mothers & Daughters" arc), using the pseudonym Viktor Davis. Among the various theories expounded upon in the piece, Sim's alter-ego Viktor Davis categorizes humanity into metaphorical lights, which tended to reside in men, and voids, which tended to be in women. He characterized Voids as "without a glimmer of understanding of intellectual processes" and declared that "Light does not Breed".

In 1995, The Comics Journal #174 featured a Bill Willingham caricature of Sim on one of the covers, bearing the title "Dave Sim: Misogynist Guru of Self-Publishers". Inside was a lengthy article written by Jonathan Hagey and Kim Thompson that published responses from comics creators such as Alan Moore, Seth, Rick Veitch, Steve Bissette, and Sim's friend and fellow Canadian Chester Brown. The responses ranged from anger to a belief that Sim was joking. Others would later speculate that Sim had a mental illness related to his heavy drug use in the late 1970s. The article also included a short interview with Sim's ex-wife, wherein she described the essay as evidence of Sim being "very scared". In the essay in Cerebus #186, Sim characterized fellow self-publishing cartoonist Jeff Smith as an example of a man dominated by his wife. When Smith contested this, Sim accused Smith of lying and challenged Smith to a boxing match, which Smith declined.

In 2001, Sim published another essay, "Tangent", in Cerebus #265 (April 2001). In it, Sim furthered the themes from "Reads", describing the tangent he contends western society has taken due to the widespread acceptance and proliferation of feminism, beginning in 1970. The Comics Journal posted the full essay on its website, although a short introduction by staff distanced the Journal from the ideas therein, calling them "nutty and loathsome". The following issue included a rebuttal to the first "Tangent" by "Ruthie Penmark". Several years later, in issue #263, the Journal devoted a section to discussion of Cerebus. It reprinted a 2001 essay by R. S. Stephen—"Masculinity's Last Hope, or Creepily Paranoid Misogynist?: An Open Letter to Dave Sim"—addressing the "Tangent" controversy. Sim's reply to Stephen, and Stephen's subsequent rebuttal, were published in The Comics Journal #266.

Despite his reputation as a misogynist, Sim maintains that he is not one. In 2008, Sim sent out a self-written form letter to individuals who had sent him mail, detailing his disagreement with being called a misogynist and disenchantment with what he perceived as a dearth of support in refuting those claims to his character. Contending that society perceived misogynists as the "lowest, subhuman form of life in our society", he mentioned that few, if any, people had defended him, allowing him to be called "the lowest, subhuman form of life in our society with impunity." Sim's letter ended with an ultimatum, requesting that those who wished to receive his return correspondence reply with a letter or online posting and the statement, "I do not believe Dave Sim is a misogynist." All others were asked not to attempt to contact him again.

=== Relationship with The Comics Journal ===
The coverage of Sim's writings about feminism was not the only subject of Sim's conflict with The Comics Journal. He and Gary Groth, the Journal's editor-in-chief, developed a combative relationship. In December 1979, the magazine published a review of the first dozen or so issues of Cerebus by Kim Thompson, who called Cerebus "a true heir to Carl Barks' duck stories".

During a panel discussion at the 1999 San Diego Comic-Con the editorial staff of The Comics Journal indicted Sim in what Groth characterized as a "Nuremberg-style tribunal designed to bring to light the most deserving criminals who had over the past decade and longer besmirched the good name of the comics art and industry". Groth took issue with a 1992 speech Sim had given to Diamond Comic Distributors, then one of the largest distributors for comic books in North America. In his speech, Sim advocated for the speculator boom occurring at the time, a position that Groth felt personified the worst aspects of capitalism and greed.

=== Accusation of child grooming ===
In September 2018, Sim publicly voiced support for Ethan Van Sciver, a leading figure in the Comicsgate movement. Van Sciver hired Sim to write a story for Van Sciver's creator-owned book Cyberfrog. In the wake of this announcement, statements Sim had made about dating a fourteen-year-old girl resurfaced. Although Sim claims that the relationship did not become sexual until just before her 21st birthday, Sim conceded that his interest in her had been immoral, and that he had violated the Mann Act when he transported her across state lines during a 1985 convention. Van Sciver initially defended the relationship but subsequently canceled the project.

== Health ==
On February 27, 2015, Sim suffered a wrist injury, and was physically unable to draw. In a September 28, 2017 video on his Cerebus Online YouTube channel, he revealed that he had been showing some signs of recovery and was able to create his first new drawing of Cerebus.

== Awards and recognition ==
In 2026, Sim was selected for inclusion in the Eisner Hall of Fame.

Former Awards and recognition include:

Year	Award	Category	Work or recognition
1981	Inkpot Award	—	Individual recognition
1985	Kirby Award	Best Black & White Series	Cerebus
1987	Kirby Award	Best Black & White Series	Cerebus
1992	Harvey Award	Best Cartoonist (Writer/Artist)	Cerebus
1994	Eisner Award	Best Graphic Album–Reprint	Cerebus: Flight (with Gerhard)
1998	Ignatz Award	Outstanding Artist	Cerebus
2004	Harvey Award	Best Letterer	Cerebus
2005	Joe Shuster Award	Outstanding Canadian Comic Book Achievement	Completion of the 300-issue Cerebus series (with Gerhard)
2006	Joe Shuster Award	Canadian Comic Book Creator Hall of Fame	Induction
2009	Joe Shuster Award	Outstanding Cartoonist (Writer/Artist)	Glamourpuss #1–4 and Judenhass
2026	Eisner Award	Will Eisner Award Hall of Fame	Induction

== Collections ==
- Cerebus Guide to Self-Publishing (ISSN 0712-7774) (1997; rev. 2010) collects selections from Sim's 'Notes from the President' column that dealt with self-publishing, the Pro/Con speech from 1993, and more.
- Collected Letters: 2004 (ISBN 0-919359-23-X, 2005) collects Sim's responses to readers' letters (the original letters are not included) after the publication of Cerebus #300.
- Dave Sim's Collected Letters 2 (ISBN 0919359248, 2008) collects Sim's responses to readers' letters (the original letters are not included) from June and July 2004.
- Dave Sim: Conversations (2013) edited by Eric Hoffman and Dominick Grace, University Press of Mississippi, 2013; collects interviews with Sim spanning 1982–2006.

== See also ==
- Canadian comics
- Cerebus phonebook
