= Aardvark-Vanaheim =

Canadian independent comic book publisher

- Industry: Comics
- Founded: 1977
- Founders: Dave Sim; Deni Loubert
- Headquarters: Kitchener, Ontario, Canada
- Website: cerebustv.com

Aardvark-Vanaheim is a Canadian independent comic book publisher founded in 1977 by Dave Sim and Deni Loubert and is best known for publishing Sim's Cerebus.

For a brief time, the company also published other titles, sometimes under the name Aardvark One International. This was mainly in the early 1980s, and most of these titles moved to Deni Loubert's new company, Renegade Press. Since the 1980s the majority of titles published by the company were related to Cerebus, although since the final issue of Cerebus was published, A-V has gone on to publish other works by Sim, including glamourpuss.

In July 1984, Aardvark-Vanaheim was threatened with possible legal action by Marvel Comics over a parody of Marvel's Wolverine character in Cerebus.

Aardvark-Vanaheims offices are located in Kitchener, Ontario.

== Titles ==
- A-V in 3-D (1984), #1
- Cerebus the Aardvark (1977–2004), #1–300 (also reprint titles Swords of Cerebus, Cerebus World Tour Book, Cerebus Number Zero, and the Cerebus "phone book" omnibuses).
- Cerebus in Hell (2017), #1–4
- Cerebus Jam (1985), #1
- glamourpuss (2008–2012), #1–26
- Cerebus Archive (2009–2012), #1–18
- Journey by William Messner-Loebs (1983–1984), #1–14 (moved to Fantagraphics)
- Judenhass by Dave Sim (2008), one-shot (nn)
- Flaming Carrot Comics by Bob Burden (1984–1985), #1–5 (moved to Renegade Press)
- normalman by Jim Valentino (1984–1985), #1–8 (moved to Renegade Press)
- Neil the Horse by Katherine Collins (1983–1984), #1–10 (moved to Renegade Press)
- Ms. Tree by Max Collins and Terry Beatty (1984–1985), #10–15 (from Eclipse Comics; moved to Renegade Press)
- The Puma Blues by Stephen Murphy and Michael Zulli (1986–1988), #1–17 (as "Aardvark One International"; issues 18–20 self-published, moved to Mirage)
- Strange Brew by Michael T. Gilbert (1982), one-shot (nn)
