= Dalibor Talajić =

Croatian comic book artist

- Born: Sarajevo, SR Bosnia and Herzegovina
- Areas: Penciller, inker and colorist
- Notable works: Deadpool Kills the Marvel Universe, Deadpool Kills the Marvel Universe Again,Madaya Mom
- Collaborators: Goran Sudžuka, Cullen Bunn, Miroslav Mrva
- Relatives: Ljiljana Molnar-Talajić (Yugoslav opera singer)

Dalibor Talajić is a Croatian comic book artist. He is most famous for his work for the Marvel Comics publishing house. He gained international acclaim and commercial success working on the Deadpool Kills the Marvel Universe series in 2012. In 2016, in collaboration with ABC News, Talajić created Madaya Mom, where he illustrated the siege of Madaya based on messages ABC reporters received from within the city.

== Biography ==
Dalibor Talajić was born in Sarajevo, SR Bosnia and Herzegovina. In 1975, his family moved to Zagreb. While in secondary school, he attended the Vatroslav Lisinski music school where he studied the clarinet. After finishing his secondary education, he studied music arts at the Music Academy in Zagreb. While at the Academy, he applied at the Academy of Fine Arts in Zagreb for two consecutive years but was not accepted. Talajić graduated from the Music Academy in 1994 and taught the clarinet at the Zlatko Baloković music school for the following eleven years. His work has been published in several Croatian magazines including the Zagreb fanzine Endem, where he still remains a regularly presented author.

Talajić entered the US comics market in 2005 and since 2009 has been working almost exclusively for Marvel. His most celebrated work for the publisher is the four-issue series Deadpool Kills the Marvel Universe (2012), which was followed by Deadpool Kills the Marvel Universe Again (2017).

== Bibliography ==
Interior comic work includes:

- The Atheist #2-4: "The Inn Between" (with Mike Raicht, co-feature, Desperado Publishing, 2005–2007)
- Negative Burn vol. 2 (anthology, Desperado Publishing):
  - Summer Special: "A Monster's Tale" (with Gary Reed, 2005)
  - Winter Special: "The Drop" (with Fabian Nicieza, 2005)
- Deadworld vol. 3 #3-6 (with Gary Reed, Desperado Publishing, 2006)
- Hunter's Moon #1-5 (with James L. White, Boom! Studios, 2007–2008)
- Hrvatski Velikani Volume 2: "Nikola Šubić-Zrinski" (with Darko Macan, anthology graphic novel, Astoria, 2008)
- La bible: L'Évangile selon Matthieu (with Jean-Christophe Camus and Michel Dufranne, Delcourt, 2009)
- Deadpool #900: "Silent but Deadly" (with Fred Van Lente, anthology, Marvel, 2009)
- Hit-Monkey (with Daniel Way, Marvel):
  - World's Greatest Assassin (digital one-shot, 2010)
  - "Year of the Monkey" (in #1-3, 2010)
- Deadpool Team-Up (Marvel):
  - "Merc with a Myth" (with Fred Van Lente, in #899, 2010)
  - "It! The Living Colossus" (with Christopher E. Long, in #895, 2010)
- PunisherMAX: Tiny Ugly World (with David Lapham, one-shot, Marvel, 2010)
- Tomb of Dracula Presents: Throne of Blood (inks on Goran Parlov, written by Victor Gischler, one-shot, Marvel, 2011)
- X-Men: To Serve and Protect #3: "...and You'll Miss It" (with Christopher Yost, anthology, Marvel, 2011)
- 5 Ronin #2: "The Way of the Monk" (with Peter Milligan, Marvel, 2011)
- Vekovnici Volume 5 (with Marko Stojanović, among other artists, System Comics, 2011)
- X-Men vol. 3 Giant-Size + #12-15: "First to Last" (with Christopher Yost and Paco Medina, Marvel, 2011)
- Shame Itself: "Marvelous" (with Kurt Braunohler and Horacio Domingues, anthology one-shot, Marvel, 2012)
- The Incredible Hulk vol. 3 #11: "The Search for the City of Sasquatches" (with Jason Aaron, Marvel, 2012)
- Avengers Origins: Luke Cage (with Mike Benson and Adam Glass, one-shot, Marvel, 2012)
- Zabava za celu porodicu #25: "Razumevanje" (with Vlada Tadić, co-feature, Lavirint, 2012)
- Ghost Rider vol. 6 #6 (with Rob Williams, Marvel, 2012)
- Deadpool Kills the Marvel Universe (with Cullen Bunn, Marvel):
  - Deadpool Kills the Marvel Universe #1-4 (2012)
  - Deadpool Kills the Marvel Universe Again #1-5 (2017)
- Uncanny X-Force vol. 2 (with Sam Humphries, Marvel):
  - "Torn and Frayed" (with Adrian Alphona, in #7-9, 2013)
  - "The Great Corruption" (with Phil Briones, in #15, 2014)
- Dexter (with Jeff Lindsay, Marvel):
  - Dexter #1-5 (2013–2014)
  - Dexter Down Under #1-5 (2014)
- Wolverine: In the Flesh (with Chris Cosentino, one-shot, Marvel, 2013)
- Empire of the Dead: Act Two #1-5 (with George A. Romero, Marvel, 2014–2015)
- In the Dark: "Set Me Free" (with Jody LeHeup, anthology graphic novel, Tiny Behemoth, 2014)
- New Avengers vol. 3 #30: "Time Runs Out, Part 14" (with Jonathan Hickman, Marvel, 2015)
- Secret Wars: Master of Kung Fu #1-4 (with Haden Blackman, Marvel, 2015)
- Red Wolf vol. 2 #1-6: "Man Out of Time" (with Nathan Edmondson, Marvel, 2016)
- Hercules vol. 4 #6: "Here's to a Long Life" (with Dan Abnett and Goran Sudžuka, Marvel, 2016)
- Civil War II: Kingpin #1: "Janus Jardeesh" (with Matthew Rosenberg, co-feature, Marvel, 2016)
- Foolkiller vol. 3 #1-5 (with Max Bemis, Marvel, 2017)
- She-Hulk (Marvel):
  - "Deconstructed" (with Mariko Tamaki and Nico Leon, in Hulk vol. 3 #2, 2017)
  - "I am... She-Hulk" (with Robbie Thompson, co-feature in #159, 2018)
- Shang-Chi, Master of Kung Fu #126 (with CM Punk, Marvel, 2018)
- Shock: "The Last Dance with You" (with Paul Jenkins, anthology graphic novel, Aftershock, 2018)
- X-Men: Black – Magneto: "The Stars, Our Destination?" (with Chris Claremont, one-shot, Marvel, 2018)
- Old Man Logan #36-38: "Moving Target" (with Ed Brisson, Marvel, 2018)
- Relay #4-5 (with Zac Thompson, Aftershock, 2019)

=== Covers only ===
- Deadworld: Frozen Over #1-4 (Desperado Publishing, 2008–2010)
