= Derek McCulloch (comics) =

Comics writer (born 1964)

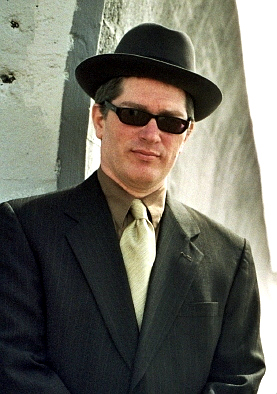
- Born: 1964 (age 61–62) Ottawa, Ontario, Canada
- Area: Writer
- Notable works: Stagger Lee

Derek McCulloch (born 1964) is a writer, known for graphic novels such as Stagger Lee, Gone to Amerikay, Pug, and Displaced Persons. He was born in Ottawa, Ontario, raised in Grande Prairie, Alberta, and lives in Oakland, California.

== Biography ==
Throughout the mid-1980s and early 1990s, he was the publisher of Strawberry Jam Comics, and wrote To Be Announced and night life. He was also co-founder of The Comic Legends Legal Defense Fund in Canada and co-edited the organization's two True North anthologies. His stories have appeared in comics series including Open Season, Shred!, and Cerebus High Society. He works as a technical editor at an engineering company.

He wrote Stagger Lee, a graphic novel based on the story of Stagger Lee and drawn by Shepherd Hendrix, which was published by Image Comics in May 2006. It has been nominated for several awards, including the Eisner Awards 2007 and the Eagle Awards 2006, and won several Glyph Comics Awards in 2007, including Story of the Year and Best Writer.

McCulloch wrote Gone to Amerikay, an original graphic novel drawn by Colleen Doran and released in 2012 to numerous positive notices from The Wall Street Journal, Boing Boing, Irish Echo, The Miami Herald, Irish Central, and The Sunday Times, Dublin edition. An excerpt from the book was included in the anthology The Best American Comics 2013 under the title "The Story of Gráinne Ní Mháille."

In 2009, he released his first book for children, T. Runt!, illustrated by Jimmie Robinson.

In 2010, he self-published a print on demand anthology of short stories, Stories of a Callow Youth.

Pug, his 2010 graphic novel with artist Greg Espinoza, was nominated for the 2011 Spinetingler Award, in the category of Best Crime Comic/Graphic Novel.

In December 2011, The Repertory Theatre of St. Louis announced that its 2012 new theatre series, Ignite! would feature a reading of a stage musical adaptation of Stagger Lee with a book by McCulloch and music and lyrics by Stew and Heidi Rodewald. When the reading took place on March 15, 2012, it was with not just book but also lyrics by McCulloch. It was directed by Amanda Dehnert and had a cast including Ken Page, Rebecca Naomi Jones, and Javier Munoz.

In August 2014, Image Comics published Displaced Persons, an original graphic novel by McCulloch and Anthony Peruzzo, described as a "tale of murder, love, crime, friendship, betrayal, and just the slightest bit of time travel," taking place in San Francisco in the years 1939, 1969, and 1999. Displaced Persons was previously announced (and solicited) in 2008 as a project for McCulloch and Rantz Hoseley. but Hoseley was not connected with the final version of the book.

In February 2016, 59E59 Theaters, an off-Broadway theater announced a stage musical adaptation of Damon Runyon's Madame La Gimp, with a book by McCulloch and Giles Havergal, lyrics by McCulloch, music by Kyle Athayde, and arrangements and orchestrations by Peter and Will Anderson. The production was scheduled for October 2016, and was to be directed by Amanda Dehnert.

In December 2018, the first of several collaborations with musician Richard Stuverud appeared, when Green Monkey Records included their song "Empty Branches" (lyrics by McCulloch, music written and performed by Stuverud) on their 2018 Christmas compilation, "A Green Monkey Christmas for Martians Up on Mars." The following year, two different versions of their song "Snowing in Frisco" appeared on Green Monkey's "Hail the Jolly Christmas Monkey!"

In May 2020, Stuverud released his first solo album, "Memories in Kodachrome," with 10 of its 11 songs featuring lyrics by McCulloch.

== Bibliography ==
=== Original graphic novels ===
- Stagger Lee (with artist Shepherd Hendrix, Image Comics, May 2006, ISBN 1-58240-607-3)
- Pug (with artist Greg Espinoza, Image Comics, July 2010, ISBN 1-60706-066-3)
- Gone to Amerikay (with artist Collen Doran, Vertigo (DC Comics), March 2012, ISBN 1-4012-2351-6)
- Displaced Persons (with artist Anthony Peruzzo, Image Comics, August 2014, ISBN 1-63215-121-9)
- To Be Announced (trade paperback reprint collection of Strawberry Jam Comics' To Be Announced, with artist Mike Bannon, About Comics, October 2022, ISBN 978-1-949996-51-7)

=== Books for Children ===
- T. Runt! (with artist Jimmie Robinson, Silverline Books, June 2009, ISBN 1-60706-074-4)

=== Prose ===
- "The Gambler" (self-published chapbook, illustrated by Ben Catmull, September 2001)
- Stories of a Callow Youth (CreateSpace, January 2010, ISBN 1-4505-1407-3)

=== Strawberry Jam Comics ===
- To Be Announced #1-7 (with artist Mike Bannon, June 1985-June 1987)
- night life #1-7 (with artist Simon Tristam, September 1986-March 1988)
- Open Season #7 (text page, July 1989)
- Oombah Jungle Moon Man #1 (text page, August 1992)

=== Other ===
- Open Season #6: "The Ballad of the Filipino Head Boxer" (written with Jim Bricker, drawn by Bricker and Shepherd Hendrix, Renegade Press, April 1988)
- The True North: "Rosebud" (with artist Simon Tristam, Comic Legends Legal Defense Fund, August 1988)
- Shred #5: "Leroy Smalls and His Amazing Atomic Skateboard," (with artist Ronny Turner, CFW Enterprises, August 1989)
- Cerebus High Society #1: "The Single Paige" (with artist Simon Tristan, Aardvark-Vanaheim, February 1990)
- The True North II: "Three Card Monty" (with artist Simon Tristan, Comic Legends Legal Defense Fund, July 1991)
- night life #8 (with artist Simon Tristan, Caliber Press, November 1991)
- night life #9 (with artist Simon Tristan, completed but unpublished)
- EXPO 2001: "Stagger Lee on American Bandstand" (with artist Rik Livingston, EXPO/CBLDF, September 2001)
- Displaced Persons preview book (with artist Rantz Hoseley, Image Comics, July 2007)
- Popgun #1: "Jenny Greenteeth" (with artist Shepherd Hendrix, Image Comics, November 2007, ISBN 1-58240-824-6)
- Comic Book Tattoo: "Pretty Good Year" (with artist Colleen Doran, Image Comics, July 2008, ISBN 1-58240-964-1)
- PopGun #2: "Nixon's the One" (with artist Ron Turner, Image Comics, July 2008, ISBN 1-58240-920-X)
- PopGun #3: "Cuffs" (with artist Peter Krause, Image Comics, April 2009, ISBN 1-58240-974-9)
- This is a Souvenir: The Songs of Spearmint and Shirley Lee: "The Last Bus Home" (with artist Jimmie Robinson, Image Comics, May 2009, ISBN 1-60706-048-5)
- PopGun #4: "Harshing the Mellow" (with artist Anthony Peruzzo, Image Comics, February 2010, ISBN 1-60706-188-0)
- Fractured Fables (Free Comic Book Day Edition): "Raponsel" (with artist Anthony Peruzzo, Image Comics, May 2010)
- Fractured Fables: "Raponsel" (with artist Anthony Peruzzo, Image Comics, July 2010, ISBN 1-60706-269-0)
- The Best American Comics 2013: "The Story of Gráinne Ní Mháille" (excerpt from Gone to Amerikay, with artist Colleen Doran, Houghton Mifflin Harcourt, October 2013, ISBN 978-0-547-99546-5)
- Little Earthquakes: the Graphic Album: "Song for Eric" (with artist Colleen Doran, Z2 Comics, December 2022, ISBN 978-1-954928-61-9)

=== Mini-Comics ===
- Krang! #5 (stories and art by Derek McCulloch, Severely, Ltd., 1988)
- Krang! #6 (stories and art by Derek McCulloch, Severely, Ltd., 1991)

== Discography ==
=== Singles ===
- "Empty Branches," by Richard Stuverud, lyrics by Derek McCulloch, music by Richard Stuverud (on "A Green Monkey Christmas for Martians Up on Mars"), December 2018
- "Snowing in Frisco Part 1," by Richard Stuverud, lyrics by Derek McCulloch, music by Richard Stuverud and Dave Flores (on "Hail the Jolly Christmas Monkey!"), December 2019
- "Snowing in Frisco Part 2," by Richard Stuverud, lyrics by Derek McCulloch, music by Richard Stuverud (on "Hail the Jolly Christmas Monkey!"), December 2019

=== Albums ===
- "Memories in Kodachrome," by Richard Stuverud, lyrics by Derek McCulloch, music by Richard Stuverud, May 2020
