= Dexter (comics) =

2013 comic book series

- Dexter #1. Cover art by Michael Del Mundo

Publication information
- Publisher: Marvel Comics
- Schedule: Monthly
- Format: Limited series
- Genre: Crime
- Publication date: June – November 2013
- No. of issues: 5

Creative team
- Created by: Jeff Lindsay
- Written by: Jeff Lindsay
- Artist: Dalibor Talajić
- Letterer: VC's Cory Petit
- Colorist: Ive Svorcina
- Editor: Bill Rossman

Dexter is a five-issue limited series comic book written by Jeff Lindsay, painted by Dalibor Talajic and published by Marvel Comics in 2013. It is based on Lindsay's popular Dexter novels.

== Publication history ==
Marvel Comics announced the Dexter comics in November 2012. The series was penned by Jeff Lindsay, the creator of the original Dexter series, and illustrated by Dalibor Talajić. Talajić's previous collaborations with Marvel include work on Deadpool and Hit-Monkey. The first issue was scheduled to be released in February 2013, prior to Showtime's final season of Dexter. However, the comics were delayed for three months and finally released in June 2013.

== Plot ==
A murder comes to the attention of Dexter and it is linked to a philanthropist group of Miami. Is that just a coincidence or are there any extended roots? On top of that, there are some unsettled accounts between the head of the group and Dexter in the past.

== Reception ==
Dexter comics received mixed to negative reviews. While Dalibor Talajic received praise for his artwork, a major complaint was that the comics failed to adapt the main character in the way the TV series had done. Some also felt that the source content could not be effectively conveyed in a Marvel comic due to removal of some mature elements.

In 2014, Marvel released another limited series Dexter comic, written by Jeff Lindsay, entitled Dexter Down Under.
