= Ages of Apocalypse =

2000 comic books

- Publisher: Marvel Comics
- Publication date: March 2000
- Genre: Superhero; Crossover
Title(s)
- Cable #77
- The Uncanny X-Men #378
- Wolverine #148
- X-Men #98
- X-Men Unlimited #26
- X-Men: Search for Cyclops #1-4
- Main characters: Apocalypse; Nate Grey; X-Men

Creative team
- Writers: Brett Booth; Alan Davis; Karl Bollers; Terry Kavanagh; Joe Pruett; Erik Larsen; Matt Nixon; Joseph Harris
- Artists: Adam Kubert; Graham Nolan; Rick Leonardi; Bernard Chang; Roger Cruz; Brett Booth; Toby Cypress; Alan Davis
- Pencillers: Joe Bennett; Tom Raney
- Ages of Apocalypse: ISBN 0-7851-2264-8

"The Ages of Apocalypse" is a series of sub-chapters to Marvel Comics' "Apocalypse: The Twelve" saga, wherein En Sabah Nur finds himself trapped in the body of Scott Summers (Cyclops of X-Men) after a failed attempt to possess Nate Grey. Using his newfound powers, Apocalypse warps reality several times, trying to get the Twelve to feed him power. "The Ages of Apocalypse" arc is an exploration of the trapped heroes finding a way out of the reality warps.

== Characters ==
Team	Leader	Members	Notes
X-Men	Professor X	Beast, Colossus, Gambit, Iceman, Marrow, Phoenix, Rogue, Storm, Wolverine Former Members: Polaris, Sunfire	Cecilia Reyes and Siphon were both members of a warped reality version of the X-Men.
X-Force		Cannonball, Warpath	All warped reality versions.
Generation X		M, Synch	All warped reality versions.
Excalibur	Captain Britain	Banshee, Colossus, Mastermind, Nightcrawler, Shadowcat	All warped reality versions.
Fantastic Four		Ghost Rider, Hulk, Spider-Man, Wolverine	All warped reality versions.
Horsemen of Apocalypse	Apocalypse	Famine (Ahab), Pestilence (Caliban), War (Deathbird), Death (Erik the Red)	All warped reality versions.
The Avengers		Former Members: Silver Surfer, Thor, Vision	All warped reality versions.

== Reading order ==
- Part 1 – Uncanny X-Men #378 – Back in the past, Gambit and Storm replace Cyclops and Angel in the original X-Men.
- Part 2 – Cable #77 – Cable is the leader of an opposition group based in Egypt.
- Part 3 – Wolverine #148 – Wolverine, Ghost Rider, Peter Parker and Hulk are the Fantastic Four.
- Part 4 – X-Men Unlimited #26 – In the near future, the aged X-Men face an attack by the Sh'iar Empire.
- Part 5 – X-Men #98 – Far in the future, the X-Men now come from many different worlds.

== Collected editions ==
The story has been collected into trade paperback and hardcover:

Title	Material collected	ISBN
Astonishing X-Men: Deathwish (Apocalypse: The Twelve Prelude)	X-Men #92, 95; Astonishing X-Men (vol. 2) #1–3; Uncanny X-Men #375	0-7851-0754-1
X-Men vs. Apocalypse: Volume 1: The Twelve	Cable #75-76, The Uncanny X-Men #376-377, Wolverine (vol. 2) #146-147 and X-Men #96-97	ISBN 0-7851-2263-X
X-Men Vs. Apocalypse Volume 2: Ages Of Apocalypse TPB	X-51 #8, Uncanny X-Men #378, Annual 1999, Cable #77, Wolverine #148, X-Men Unlimited #26, X-Men #98 and X-Men: Search for Cyclops #1–4	ISBN 0-7851-2264-8
X-Men Vs. Apocalypse: The Twelve Omnibus	Uncanny X-Men #371-380, Annual 1999; X-Men #91-93, 94 (a Story), 95-99, Annual 1999; X-Men Unlimited #24(a Story), 25-26; Gambit #8-9; Astonishing X-Men #1-3; Wolverine #145-149; Cable #71-78; X-Man #59-60; X-51 #8; X-force #101; X-Men 1999 Yearbook	ISBN 1-302-92287-4
