= Roxanne Starr =

Comics artist

- Born: Paris, France
- Occupations: Graphic designer, Comic book letterer
- Years active: 1984-Present

Roxanne Starr is an American graphic designer and comic book letterer.

== Biography ==
=== Early life and education ===
Roxanne Starr was born in Paris, France to German parents, however was raised in the United States after moving to New York City at the age of two. Her career in art began at age fourteen when she took a summer job as a colorist for a textile design company. She later graduated from the City College of New York with a degree in Art and minor in Philosophy. Starr took commercial art courses at the School of Visual Arts, taking two years off to work as a Traffic Editor at The National Enquirer. Her first job after college was in advertising at a Madison Avenue agency.

=== Flaming Carrot Comics ===
In 1980, Starr moved to Atlanta where she freelanced as a graphic designer. In 1982, she began lettering comics, initially with Bob Burden's Flaming Carrot Comics.

At first, she hand-lettered her works, but eventually created fonts to imitate her style.

In 1984, soon after Starr started working on Flaming Carrot, the book was picked up by Canadian-based publisher Aardvark-Vanaheim. Four years later, Starr became Flaming Carrot's editor when it was picked up by Dark Horse Comics.

=== The 1990s ===
By the early 1990s, Starr was freelancing as a comic book letterer while working a day job in the magazine industry. As a Commercial Art Director, she gave cover and interior editorial art assignments to comics artists like Dave Johnson, Craig Hamilton, and Michael Zulli.

In the early 1990s, Starr was assigned by editor Paul Jenkins to re-letter the first two issues of Alan Moore and Bill Sienkiewicz's ultimately unfinished project Big Numbers — which was to be picked up by Tundra Publishing — and continue on as the project letterer of the remaining issues. Big Numbers would halt with only two issues released commercially.

Starr did most of her professional lettering during the comics’ boom of the 1990s. In addition to Flaming Carrot Comics, titles she worked on included books published by Malibu Comics' Ultraverse imprint (1993–1995) and James D. Hudnall's ESPers (1996–1997). The majority of her work was with Caliber Comics, lettering Brian Michael Bendis' creator-owned Jinx (1997) and Joe Pruett's anthology comic book series Negative Burn (1998). Starr lettered a number of "The Alan Moore Songbook" stories in Negative Burn — stories written by Moore and illustrated by various artists.

=== Present ===
Starr currently lives in Atlanta, Georgia, and still works with Bob Burden on his various creator-owned projects, including his 2012 Flaming Carrot Kickstarter campaign which raised $42,048. In 2015, Stable Enterprises Press released Stable Enterprises' first issue, "Sexy Enterprises", an illustrated novel written by Starr, with art by Timothy Paul. Sexy Enterprises is ta pseudo-autobiographical parody novel about the comics industry and the many freelance artists with whom Starr has worked.
