= Desperado Publishing =

American independent comic book publisher

- Parent company: Image Comics (2005–2007); IDW Publishing (2009–present)
- Founder: Joe Pruett
- Key people: Stephan Nilson, Gary Reed
- Publication types: Comics, trade paperbacks
- Fiction genres: Horror
- Official website: www.desperadopublishing.com

Desperado Publishing is an American independent comic book publisher, established in 2004. Located in Norcross, Georgia, Desperado's president is Joe Pruett, its creative director is Stephan Nilson, and its director of business development is former Caliber Press publisher Gary Reed.

== Overview ==
With a background as former creative director of Caliber Press and editor of Caliber's 1990s anthology Negative Burn, Pruett founded Desperado in 2004.

After initially planning on launching the Desperado line alone, Pruett instead announced in September 2004 that Desperado had joined Image Comics' publishing lineup. The debut titles under the Desperado/Image publishing partnership were Bob Burden's Flaming Carrot and a specially priced preview book, Desperado Primer, which gave readers a chance to sample the talent assembled under the Desperado umbrella. (The Desperado Primer featured stories written by Paul Jenkins, with art by Adam Hughes, Brian Stelfreeze, Cully Hamner, Phil Hester, Kelsey Shannon, and Jason Pearson, and a prologue to Tony Harris's Roundeye). In January 2005 they published Freak Show, a hardcover compilation of four vintage horror comics stories by the team of artist Bernie Wrightson & writer Bruce Jones.

In addition, Pruett and Desperado revived Negative Burn, starting with two seasonal specials in 2005, and segueing into a monthly title in 2006. Pruett views the new incarnation of Negative Burn as a potential launching pad for new creators: "I'm offering Negative Burn as a way for a new creator to break in with us. If a creator shows promise and potential with his/her short story contributions then I might try to find them work with an already established creator or title in our library of titles.... I believe there needs to be an outlet for new talent... and [I] will try to do what I can to help them."

In March 2007, Desperado separated from Image after a two-and-a-half-year publishing partnership to become a self-sufficient publishing entity. (Negative Burn volume two's first eleven issues were published by Image.) As such, Desperado would publish under its own banner.

In 2009, Desperado was acquired by IDW Publishing as a new imprint.

Desperado also produced a line of art books, which kicked off with the Eisner Award-winning The Art of Brian Bolland. Other titles include Archetype: The Art of Tim Bradstreet, The Art of P. Craig Russell, and The Art of Joe Jusko. In 2011, in collaboration with IDW, they published Jeffrey Jones: A Life In Art.

== Creators ==
In addition to the aforementioned Burden, Harris, Hester, Jenkins, and Stelfreeze; notable creators involved with Desperado include Brian Bolland, P. Craig Russell, Andrew Robinson, Joe Jusko, Michael Gaydos, Tim Bradstreet, Goran Sudzuka, John McCrea, J.M. DeMatteis, Mike Ploog, Ron Kasman and Keith Giffen.

== Titles ==
- Antoine Sharp (formerly The Atheist)
- Atomik Mike
- Cherubs!
- Common Foe
- Deadworld
- Detectives Inc.
- Dusty Star
- Flaming Carrot
- Hatter M
- Monsterpocalypse
- Necessary Evil
- Negative Burn
- The Revenant
- Roundeye
- Sabre
- Starchild
- Thirteen Steps

== Awards ==
Two Desperado titles won 2007 Eisner Awards:

- Best Humor Publication: Flaming Carrot Comics by Bob Burden
- Best Comics-Related Book: The Art of Brian Bolland, edited by Joe Pruett
