= Apocalypse: The Twelve =

Marvel Comics storyline

- The Uncanny X-Men #377 (February 2000). Cover art by Adam Kubert and Scott Hanna.
- Publisher: Marvel Comics
- Publication date: January – February 2000
- Genre: Superhero; Crossover
Title(s)
- Cable #75-76
- The Uncanny X-Men #376-377
- Wolverine (vol. 2) #146-147
- X-Man #60
- X-Men (vol. 2) #96-97
- Main characters: Apocalypse; Generation X; Horsemen of Apocalypse; X-Force; X-Man; X-Men; Skrulls; The Twelve: - Bishop; - Cable; - Cyclops; - Iceman; - Living Monolith; - Magneto; - Phoenix; - Polaris; - Professor X; - Mikhail Rasputin; - Storm; - Sunfire

Creative team
- Writers: Chris Claremont; Alan Davis; Terry Kavanagh; Erik Larsen; Fabian Nicieza; Joe Pruett
- Pencillers: Bernard Chang; Roger Cruz; Alan Davis; Rob Liefeld; Mike S. Miller; Tom Raney
- Editors: Pete Franco; Bob Harras; Mark Powers
- The Twelve: ISBN 0-7851-2263-X

"The Twelve" is a comic book crossover storyline published by Marvel Comics in March 2000. The storyline was continued and concluded with the Ages of Apocalypse crossover.

== Background ==
The story of the Twelve begins with a young mutant by the name of Tanya Trask, who would later become Madame Sanctity. Adrift in the timestream, Tanya was rescued by Rachel Summers, in her guise of Mother Askani, who took her to the future and there healed her mind. This future, under the rule of Apocalypse, was somber and grim, and Tanya sought to change it. She traveled back in time, three years before the formation of the X-Men, despite Mother Askani's warnings not to do so, and attempted to contact her father, Bolivar Trask. Rachel followed her and stopped her from revealing herself to her father, but not before Tanya could tamper with her father's creation, Master Mold, and upload a program called "The Twelve".

Years later, as Cyclops pondered his relationship with Madelyne Pryor in Alaska, he was attacked by Master Mold, who claimed Cyclops was one of the Twelve and had to be killed. Master Mold was stopped, but not before revealing several other possible members of the Twelve, such as Charles Xavier, Apocalypse, Storm, Jean Grey, and Franklin Richards among others.

Master Mold survived the encounter and later faced Power Pack in an attempt to kill Franklin Richards. As the youngsters fought the demented robot, he revealed the nature of the Twelve: "The dozen mutant humans who will one day rise up and lead all of mutantkind in war against Homo sapiens in the twilight of Earth." He was stopped, but not before revealing several other possible candidates, including Danielle Moonstar, Cannonball and Psylocke.

The subsequent mention of the Twelve came from Apocalypse himself, claiming that not only was he one of the "fabled Twelve", but so too were all five original X-Men, Charles Xavier, Storm, Cannonball and Cable.

As the new millennium approached, a series of events led to the return of Apocalypse. Cable was witness to said events — the darkening of New York City, the arrival of the Harbinger of Apocalypse, and several other signs. Mother Askani's astral form revealed herself to Cable, implanting the knowledge of who the Twelve were. Sadly, he never had the opportunity to find them.

== Plot synopsis ==
Apocalypse began his attack by planting a fake Wolverine among the ranks of the X-Men. This led Xavier, who suspected the infiltration, to disband the X-Men. The X-Men parted ways, and soon after, Rogue and Shadowcat found themselves protecting Mystique from Japan's military, the Yakiba. As Rogue fought Sunfire and his men, Kitty watched over Mystique and found, unwittingly, Destiny's diary. The diary itself had a cryptic description of a "thirteenth" and told that the Twelve would be involved in the destruction of the world.

With the death of Wolverine's imposter, the X-Men reunited at the mansion, only to discover it was not truly Wolverine who had died, but a Skrull. The infiltrator had been found. To save Polaris from abduction, Cyclops took her place using an image inducer, and the X-Men followed him to the Skrulls' lair, where they were attacked by Death, Apocalypse's most lethal and fiercest Horseman, the same person responsible for the death of the fake Wolverine. After a heavy battle, Death was unmasked by Colossus. The X-Men were surprised to see their newest enemy was in truth the real Wolverine, who had earlier volunteered for the role knowing that the other possibility (Sabretooth) would enjoy it too much whereas he himself would fight the conditioning involved. Following this revelation, Death escaped, leaving the X-Men with half-truths and enigmas that needed solving.

Soon after, Xavier revealed the "List of Twelve", written in Destiny's Diary. The Twelve were:

1. Magneto
2. Polaris
3. Storm
4. Sunfire
5. Iceman
6. Cyclops
7. Phoenix
8. Cable
9. Bishop
10. Mikhail Rasputin
11. Professor X
12. Living Monolith

The Horsemen of Apocalypse kidnapped Cable, Mikhail Rasputin, Iceman, Sunfire and the Living Monolith. The X-Men, with Magneto's help, rushed to Egypt, to Apocalypse's lair. They were soon attacked by an army of Skrulls and followers of Apocalypse. Amidst the battle, Bishop, who had been trapped in an alternate future reality, appeared out of thin air, furthering the confusion. Thanks to illusions and lies, the agents of Apocalypse were able to kidnap all remaining members of the Twelve. Their true role was then explained at last. Polaris and Magneto represented the opposing magnetic poles; Storm, Iceman and Sunfire represented the elements of nature; Cyclops, Jean, and Cable represented the unity of family (Father, Mother and Child), and chosen for the power of the Summers-Grey bloodline; Bishop and Mikhail represented the control over time and space; Xavier represented the power of mind and the Living Monolith represented the core. Placing the Twelve inside containment cells, part of an ages-old Celestial machine, Apocalypse would then siphon the energies of the "Eleven of Power" through the Living Monolith to start the machine, which would grant him omnipotence. However, Apocalypse knew his frail, centuries-old body would not be able to withstand such power. And that's when he revealed the thirteenth mutant, the X-Man, Nate Grey. He intended to transfer his consciousness into Nate's young body and then use the energies of the Twelve to evolve.

He began the process, but Magneto's then-recent power loss was something Apocalypse had not counted, and soon his energies were depleted, creating a break in the chain of power. Apocalypse increased the flow of energies, attempting to bypass the break, but this drove the Living Monolith insane, destroying his containment unit and starting a rampage that unwittingly released the X-Men. While half of the team battled the Monolith, the other half attempted to stop Apocalypse. Jean Grey exposed the true nature of Apocalypse, showing his rotting body inside his armor. As he tried to enter Nate Grey's body, Cyclops took his place, sacrificing himself to save Nate. Jean attempted to contact her husband's mind, but Xavier claimed there was nothing of Cyclops left inside Apocalypse.

The story carries on into the Ages of Apocalypse arc, where Apocalypse using the energies gathered from the Twelve, re-made reality twice, attempting to re-create the process once more and finish his transformation. He was unable to do so, for the X-Men fought him both times, in the past and the future. His energies spent, he and the Living Monolith escaped. The X-Men had prevented Apocalypse from becoming a god, at the seeming expense of Cyclops' life. Heartbroken over her husband's death, Jean took a leave of absence from the X-Men.

== Characters ==
Team	Leader	Members
X-Men	Professor Xavier	Archangel, Beast, Cable, Colossus, Cyclops, Gambit, Iceman, Marrow, Nightcrawler, Phoenix, Polaris, Psylocke, Rogue, Shadowcat, Storm, Wolverine Former Members: Bishop, Sunfire
X-Force		Cannonball, Domino, Warpath
Generation X		Jubilee
Horsemen of Apocalypse	Apocalypse	Death (Wolverine), War (Deathbird), Famine (Ahab), Pestilence (Caliban)
Cadre K	Z'Cann	Cadre K are a group of mutant Skrulls, founded by Professor Xavier.

Nate Grey, Mikhail Rasputin, Living Monolith and Magneto were all also primary characters.

== Crossover issues ==
The lead-in to the series, including the Wolverine impostor and the disbanding of the team, occurred in the following issues:

1. The Uncanny X-Men #370–375
2. X-Men (vol. 2) #91–95
3. Astonishing X-Men (vol. 2) #1–3
4. Wolverine (vol. 2) #145

The Apocalypse: The Twelve crossover proper was contained in the following comic books:

1. The Uncanny X-Men #376
2. Cable #75
3. X-Man #59
4. X-Men (vol. 2) #96
5. Wolverine (vol. 2) #146
6. Wolverine (vol. 2) #147
7. X-Man #60
8. The Uncanny X-Men #377
9. Cable #76
10. X-Men (vol. 2) #97

The crossover also led directly into the Ages of Apocalypse.

== Collected editions ==
The story has been collected into trade paperbacks and hardcover:

Title	Material collected	ISBN
X-Men vs. Apocalypse: Volume 1: The Twelve	Cable #75-76, The Uncanny X-Men #376-377, Wolverine (vol. 2) #146-147 and X-Men (vol. 2) #96-97	ISBN 0-7851-2263-X
X-Men Vs. Apocalypse Volume 2: Ages of Apocalypse	X-51 #8, The Uncanny X-Men #378, Annual 1999, Cable #77, Wolverine (vol. 2) #148, X-Men Unlimited #26, X-Men (vol. 2) #98 and X-Men: Search for Cyclops # 1–4	ISBN 0-7851-2264-8
X-Men Vs. Apocalypse: The Twelve Omnibus	Uncanny X-Men #371-380, Annual 1999; X-Men (vol. 2) #91-93, 94 (A story), 95-99, Annual 1999; X-Men Unlimited #24 (A story), 25-26; Gambit #8-9; Astonishing X-Men #1-3; Wolverine (vol. 2) #145-149; Cable #71-78; X-Man #59-60; X-51 #8; X-Force #101; X-Men 1999 Yearbook	ISBN 1-302-92287-4

== In other media ==
- The Twelve Saga is loosely adapted in the X-Men: Evolution episode "Dark Horizon". Like in the original story, Apocalypse attempts to become godlike by taking the powers of various mutants through manipulating others. In a simplified version of the plan, Apocalypse and Mesmero manipulate Rogue into absorbing the powers of the X-Men, Brotherhood of Mutants, and Acolytes before taking the powers for themselves.
- Elements of The Twelve Saga were used in X-Men: Apocalypse, with Apocalypse taking the powers of other mutants and planning to transfer his consciousness into Charles Xavier's body.
