= Neil the Horse =

Comic book character

- Neil the Horse Comics and Stories #1 (1983).

Publication information
- Publisher: Aardvark-Vanaheim; Renegade Press; Conundrum Press
- First appearance: Newspaper strip: 1975; Comics: Charlton Bullseye #1 (June 1981)
- Created by: Katherine Collins (as "Arn Saba")

In-story information
- Species: Horse
- Partnerships: Soapy; Mam'selle Poupée
Neil the Horse Comics and Stories
Publication information
- Schedule: Monthly
- Format: Ongoing series
- Genre: Humor, talking animal
- Publication date: Feb. 1983 – Aug. 1988
- No. of issues: 15
- Main character(s): Neil the Horse; Mam'selle Poupée; Soapy
Creative team
- Written by: Katherine Collins
- Artist: Katherine Collins
Collected editions
- The Collected Neil the Horse: ISBN 978-1772620153

Neil the Horse is a comic book character created by Canadian cartoonist Katherine Collins (as "Arn Saba") in 1975. Neil is a happy, singing and dancing horse who likes bananas and milkshakes. Neil's adventures were syndicated in Canadian newspapers, published in a comic book series, and adapted for a radio musical.

The comic book series featured Neil and his friends Soapy the Cat and the romantic marionette Mam'selle Poupée. All three of the characters sing, dance, and play music. The more developed comics stories primarily revolve around the trio's attempts to attain show-business success. While existing as a fantasy with nostalgic style, Neil the Horse also pays tribute to the era it was made (the 1980s). A typical issue included a story in prose with illustrations, a few short comic strips, and a longer comic-strip adventure.

As the motto of Neil the Horse was "Making the World Safe for Musical Comedy", all issues also included original sheet music for the songs sung by the characters in the course of their adventures.

A complete reprinting of the series, The Collected Neil the Horse, was published by Conundrum Press in 2017.

== Characters overview ==
Neil is a happy go-lucky (and not too bright) horse with a mania for bananas. In some issues he breakdances in urban streets to the accompaniment of a boombox.

Mam'selle Poupée is a hopeless romantic living doll from France. Poupée's body is jointed like a Barbie figurine. With the red circles on her cheeks, curly hair, large bust and thin waistline, the French-accented Poupée appears to be a cross between Raggedy Ann and Dolly Parton. She wears headbands and works out à la Olivia Newton-John. In "Video Wars" (issues #4-7), the gang comes in contact with characters that inhabit an arcade game.

Soapy is a street-wise and cynical (with a heart of gold) orange cat, a cigar-smoker and a drinker, who serves as their manager and the brains of the operation.

== Publication history ==
=== Syndicated strip ===
Neil the Horse started life in 1975 as a weekly newspaper comic strip, self-syndicated by Vancouver cartoonist Collins to Canadian regional newspapers. In 1977, Collins and Toronto cartoonist Jeff Wakefield (Bubblegummers) joined forces to found 'Great Lakes Publishing" (GLP), a cartoon syndicate dedicated to promoting Canadian newspaper comics. At its height, GLP sold weekly comic strips, including Neil the Horse, to about 30 newspapers. GLP quietly faded out of existence in 1982. The early Neil strips were reprinted in The Menomonee Falls Guardian.

For the first two years, Neil was a double-tier comedy-adventure continuity strip, afterward switching to a single-tier gag format. The purported gags were highly surreal, and in fact at times deliberately nonsensical and without a real punchline. Collins has referred to these strips as having "symbolized a comic strip", rather than actually being one.

=== Neil the Horse Comics and Stories ===
Neil the Horse appeared as a comics feature in the 1980 and 1981 editions of the Canadian Children's Annual, and Potlatch Presents the 1980 Comics Annual, published by Potlatch Publications of Hamilton, Ontario. Neil the Horse's first comic book appearance was in a colorized version of a 1978 comic strip featured in the first issue of Charlton Comics's Charlton Bullseye, which also announced "next issue: Neil the Horse by Arn Saba!" The second issue of Charlton Bullseye featured an eight page colour story titled simply "Neil the Horse", in which Neil, Soapy, and Poupée take a trip to another universe. Much of this work was seen by Dave Sim and Deni Loubert of the Kitchener, Ontario-based publisher Aardvark-Vanaheim, which led to their offering to publish Neil, first as a backup to Sim's Cerebus and then as a periodical comic book.

Neil the Horse Comics and Stories was published from 1983 to 1984 by Aardvark-Vanaheim (issues #1–10), and then from 1985 to 1988 by Renegade Press (issues #11–15), also under Deni Loubert. Issues #11 and 13 of Neil the Horse involved a tribute to Fred Astaire with song-and-dance routines that flowed from page to page. Letters to Neil the Horse were always (ostensibly) "answered" by Neil and his friends, instead of the comics' creator. Some of the materials were reprints from the 1970s newspaper comic strip and other sources, with the series described (by "Soapy") in the final issue as containing "everyt'in what's any good from our foist thoiteen years".

Creator Collins always worked with other cartoonists as assistants/collaborators. Her primary pairings were with David Roman of Toronto and Barb Rausch of Los Angeles, both of whom assisted with plotting and penciling. It was common for the original art pages to be sent by courier back and forth between the two cities to be worked on; throughout the 1980s, Collins frequently moved back and forth between cities, and as well often worked while in transit, setting up a temporary studio in guest rooms and even once in a gazebo in Oakland, California.

The last published appearance of Neil the Horse was "Autumn Adventures", a text comic included in the 1989 double-length "final issue" #50 (it was in fact followed by issues #48–49) of Fantagraphics' Critters. In 2017 Conundrum Press announced and published a collection of the full 15-issue series as The Collected Neil the Horse, including a foreword by Trina Robbins and new commentary by Collins.

=== Animation adaptation attempts ===
Collins's ambition was to adapt Neil for animation—preferably a full-length feature, but failing that, a television series. To that end, starting in 1985, she began a major adaptation effort, employing David Roman and a fluctuating number (3–12) of experienced animation artists and writers. As a business partner, John Gertz of Berkeley, California-based Zorro Productions was the salesman, adviser, and liaison with Hollywood studios. Between 1988 and 1993, Neil was "optioned" several times by major animation studios and television networks, but no program was ever produced.

=== Radio musical ===
In 1982, Collins wrote a two-and-a-half hour radio musical called Neil the Horse and the Big Banana that was twice broadcast in five episodes, in Canada on CBC Radio's Morningside. Collins wrote the script, music, and lyrics, and played the part of Neil. The musical was unanimously reviewed with raves across the country, but subsequent efforts to mount later musical-comedy projects were unsuccessful.

In 1986, Collins wrote and produced a twelve-song Neil the Horse music tape, Neil the Horse: Bananas are Here to Stay, with all new material, which was sold through the comic book. Both the play and the tape were produced with a full twelve-piece band, and live tap-dancers, in jazzy Broadway style.
