= Deni Loubert =

Canadian comics publisher

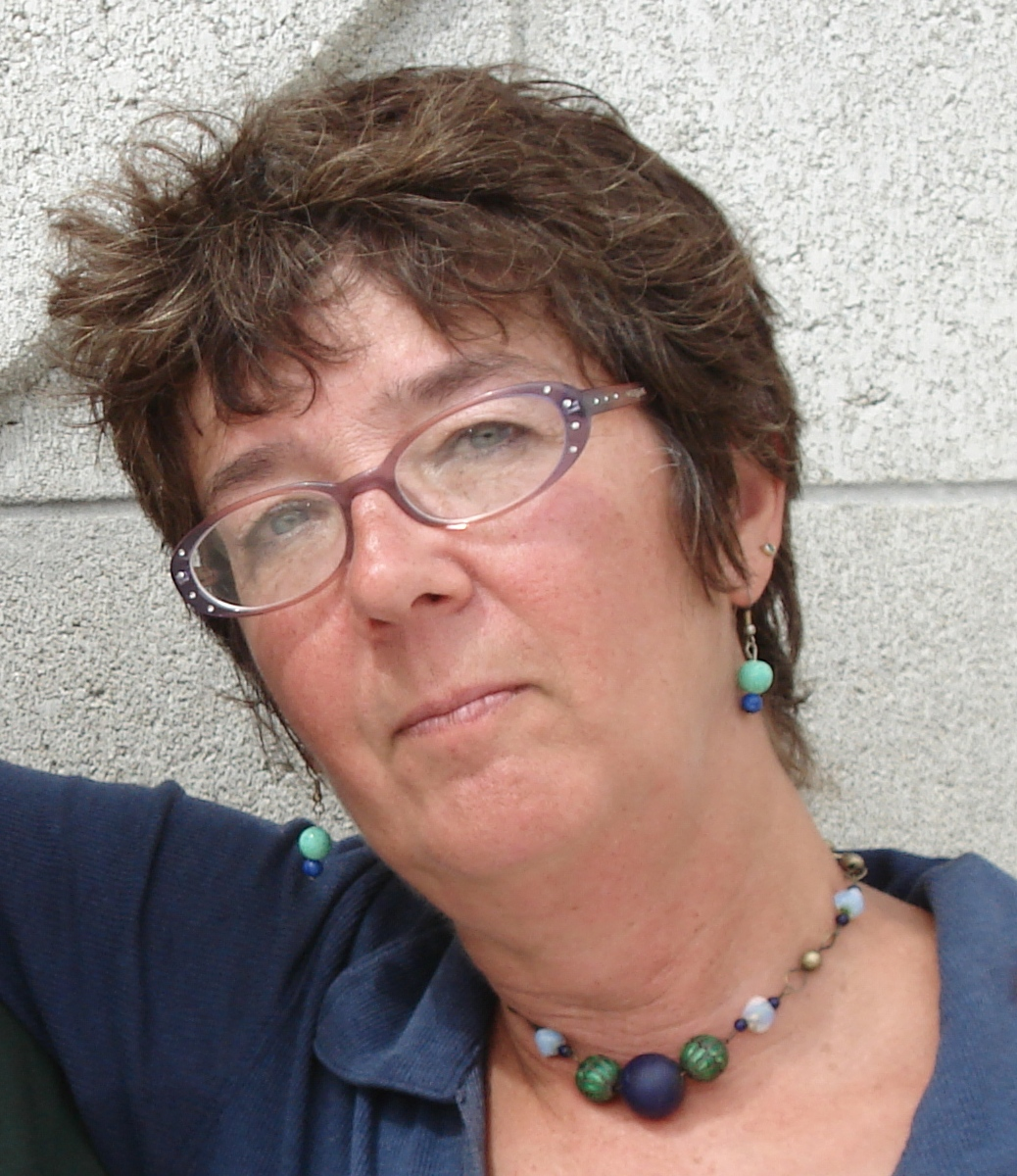
- Deni Loubert at 2008 San Diego Comic-Con
- Born: Denise Loubert; September 30, 1951 (age 75) Timmins, Ontario, Canada
- Area: Publisher
- Notable works: Aardvark-Vanaheim; Renegade Press
- Collaborators: Dave Sim
- Awards: Inkpot Award, 1987; Canadian Comic Book Creator Hall of Fame, 2010
- Spouse: Dave Sim (1978-1983)

Denise "Deni" Loubert (born September 30, 1951) is a Canadian comics publisher, co-founder of Aardvark-Vanaheim, and founder of Renegade Press. She is the ex-wife of Dave Sim, with whom she founded Aardvark-Vanaheim and published Cerebus from issues #1 to #77 (1977–1985).

Loubert and Sim met in 1976 and were married from October 6, 1978, to August 20, 1983. The barbarian aardvark Cerebus was sketched initially by Sim as a mascot to accompany Loubert's proposed fanzine, Cerebus, so titled when Loubert misspelled Cerberus, the name of the mythical dog guarding Hades. The fanzine went unpublished.

Aardvark-Vanaheim, managed by Loubert, began publishing other comics besides Cerebus, such as William Messner-Loebs's Journey and Bob Burden's Flaming Carrot. After Sim and Loubert's 1984 separation, Loubert started Renegade Press. Cerebus was the only title to remain at Aardvark-Vanaheim, with Renegade assuming publishing duties for most other titles. Renegade Press operated from 1984 to 1989.

Loubert's brother is Michael Loubert, who designed the original map used as the basis of Cerebus's world, Estarcion. Michael Loubert also wrote "The Aardvarkian Age" columns that appeared in early issues of Cerebus.

== Awards ==
In 1987, Loubert was presented with an Inkpot Award. In 2010, she was inducted into the Canadian Comic Book Creator Hall of Fame. In 2024, she was inducted into The Giants of the North: The Canadian Cartoonist Hall of Fame.

=== Controversy ===
In 1987, Loubert accepted an Inkpot Award on Steve Ditko's behalf (Renegade had published Ditko's World in 1986). Ditko refused the award, phoning Loubert to say, "Awards bleed the artist and make us compete against each other. They are the most horrible things in the world. How dare you accept this on my behalf." At Ditko's behest, Loubert returned the award to the San Diego Comic-Con organizers.

== Bibliography ==
- "A Case for Reading," The Comics Journal #102 (Sept. 1985), pp. 111–112 — editorial about literacy, illiteracy, the Business Council for Effective Literacy, and the Literacy Volunteers of America
- "On the Edge" (art by Angela Bocage), in Wimmen's Comix #14 (Last Gasp, 1989), pp. 23–26
- "Hero Worship" (written with Len Wein), in Against the Wind, edited by Richard Pini (New York: Tom Doherty Associates, 1992)
- "The Former Mrs. Viktor Davis," The Comics Journal #174 (Feb. 1995), pp. 116–118
- (ed.) How to Get Girls (into your Store): a Friends of Lulu Retailers Handbook (San Diego, CA: Friends of Lulu, 1997)
