= Silent Invasion =

Silent Invasion may refer to:

- Silent Invasion (book), a 2018 non-fiction book
- The Silent Invasion, a 1962 film
- The Silent Invasion (comics), a black and white comics series
