= Comic Legends Legal Defense Fund =

Canadian nonprofit organization

- Formation: 1987
- Headquarters: Toronto, Ontario, Canada
- Website: www.clldf.ca

The Comic Legends Legal Defense Fund (CLLDF) is a Canadian nonprofit organization, created in 1987 to protect the free speech rights of comics creators, publishers, retailers, and readers, by helping to cover legal expenses in the defense of cases where its directors feel those issues are at stake.

== History ==
The Comic Legends Legal Defense Fund was begun by writer Derek McCulloch, Vancouver comics convention organizer Leonard S. Wong, student and community organizer Liz Schiller, and Paul Stockton of Strawberry Jam Comics to assist with the legal defense of Comic Legends, a Calgary, Alberta comic shop whose owners were charged with selling obscene materials. The CLLDF raised approximately $3000 to aid in the owners' defense, bringing Fantagraphics publisher Gary Groth to Calgary to testify as an expert witness in the trial. The trial ended with a conviction and a sentence totaling $3,000 in fines. The CLLDF supported an appeal. The conviction was not overturned, but the sentence was reduced to a nominal fine. As part of this effort, the organization published the books True North and True North II as fund-raisers.

In later years, the organization made financial contributions to support Little Sister's Book and Art Emporium in its legal dispute with Canada Customs over imported comics, and paid for an expert witness whose testimony assisted in the acquittal of Marc Laliberte, a fanzine publisher in Windsor, Ontario.

In 2011, the organization, which had been mostly dormant for twenty years, became involved in a case involving a U.S. citizen visiting Canada, whose laptop computer had been searched by Canada Customs and who was arrested and charged with possession of "child pornography" based on the comics illustrations found there. In coordination with the Comic Book Legal Defense Fund, a U.S. organization with similar goals, which became involved because of the defendant's citizenship and international elements of the legal issues, the CLLDF raised funds for his defense and to promote awareness of the legal issues involved in the case. The organization contributed US$11,000 toward his $75,000 legal expenses; charges were dropped.

To facilitate fundraising, CLLDF formally incorporated in 2011 as a nonprofit organization. At the same time, the fund expanded its board of directors from three (McCulloch, Stockton, and Wong) to five, adding retailers Jay Bardyla and Jennifer Haines.

== See also ==
- Comic Book Legal Defense Fund
