= Joe Pruett =

American comic book writer, editor, and publisher

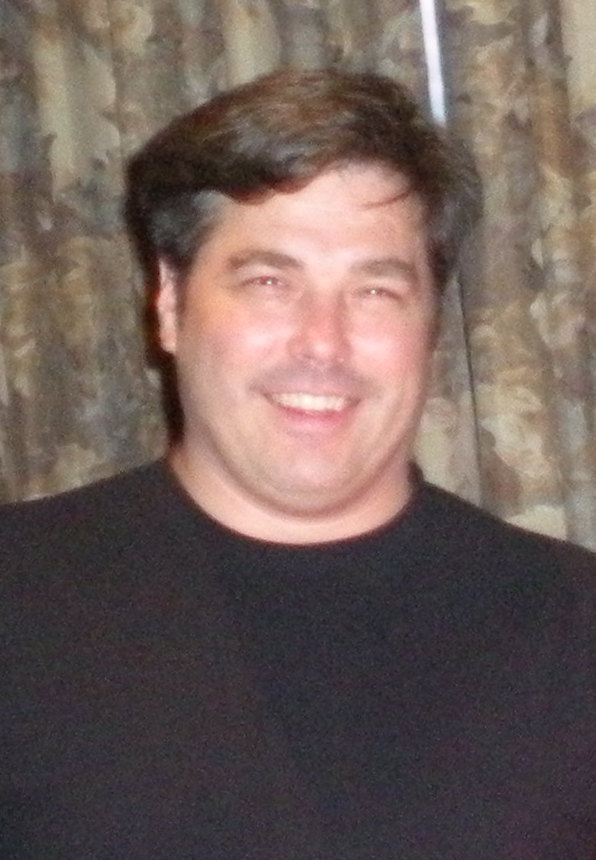
- Joe Pruett in 2009
- Areas: Writer, Editor, Publisher, Letterer
- Notable works: Negative Burn; Kilroy Is Here

Joe Pruett (born January 8, 1966) is an American comic book writer, editor, and publisher, and the co-founder of Desperado Publishing and AfterShock Comics.

== Biography ==
Pruett broke into the industry during the year of 1989 as Bob Burden's assistant on Flaming Carrot Comics, where he inked backgrounds, assisted on lettering, and transcribed scripts. He worked with Burden from issues #23-29.

In 1992, Pruett joined Gary Reed's Caliber Comics where he served through 1998 as a writer, an editor, and a creative director. While at Caliber, Pruett's anthology title Negative Burn was nominated for numerous Harvey and Eisner awards.

In 1998 he left Caliber to become a freelance writer and became a regular contributor to Marvel's X-Men books. In particular he wrote Cable during the storylines "Apocalypse: The Twelve" and "Ages of Apocalypse".

Pruett formed Desperado Publishing in the summer of 2004 and brought back the second series of Negative Burn. He is launching a third series of yearly anthology books in 2010.

In 2015, Pruett co-founded the creator-owned publisher AfterShock Comics with Marvel Comics veteran Mike Marts.

== Awards ==
Awards he has won or been nominated for include:

- 1994: Negative Burn nominated for "Best Anthology" Harvey Award
- 1995:
  - "We Can Get Them For You Wholesale" from Negative Burn #11, nominated for "Best Short Story" Eisner Award (story adapted by Pruett from prose by Neil Gaiman)
  - Negative Burn nominated for "Best Anthology" Harvey Award
- 1996:
  - Best of Negative Burn nominated for "Best Graphic Album of Previously Released Material" Harvey Award
  - Negative Burn nominated for "Best Anthology" Harvey Award
- 1997:
  - Nominated for "Best Editor" Eisner Award, for Negative Burn
  - Negative Burn nominated for "Best Anthology" Eisner Award
  - Negative Burn nominated for "Best Anthology" Harvey Award
- 1999: Negative Burn #50 nominated for "Best Anthology" Eisner Award
- 2007: Won "Best Comics-Related Book" Eisner Award for The Art of Brian Bolland
- 2022 Won Gary Reed Independent Creator of the Year Award

== Bibliography ==
=== Writer ===
Comics he has written include:

- Negative Burn vol. 1 (Caliber Comics):
  - "Kilroy Is Here: Tiananmen Square" (with pencils by Guy Burwell and inks by Tim Bradstreet, in Negative Burn #1, July 1993)
  - "The Panic" (with J. Adam Walters, in Negative Burn #3, September 1993)
  - "Kilroy Is Here: Rosewood" (with pencils by Guy Burwell, in Negative Burn #4, October 1993)
  - "Kilroy Is Here: Safe Haven" (with pencils by Ken Meyer Jr., in Negative Burn #6, December 1993)
  - "We Can Get Them For You Wholesale" (adapted from story by Neil Gaiman, with pencils by Ken Meyer Jr., in Negative Burn #11, May 1994)
  - "Kilroy Is Here: Henry" (with pencils by Marc Erickson, in Negative Burn #13, July 1994)
- Kilroy Is Here #0-10 (Caliber Comics, 1994–1996, tpb also including short stories, 304 pages, Desperado Publishing, April 2006, ISBN 1-58240-587-5)
- Cable #71, 73-78 (with pencils by Rob Liefeld, Bernard Chang, Michael Ryan and Juan Santacruz, Marvel Comics, September 1999 - April 2000)
- X-Men Unlimited #24-30 (with pencils by Pascual Alixe, Brett Booth, Ron Lim and John Czop, Marvel Comics, September 1999 - January 2001)
- Wolverine vol. 2 #158 (with Sunny Lee (pencils), Harry Candelario (inks) and Richard Starkings (colors), Marvel Comics, January 2001)
- Gambit #25 (with Scott Lobdell, and pencils by Georges Jeanty, Marvel Comics, February 2001)
- "First Among Men" (with Marcelo Frusin, in Weird Western Tales vol. 2 #2, DC Comics, May 2001)

=== Editor ===
Comics (and comics-related books) he has edited include:

- Negative Burn #1-50 (Caliber Comics, January 1993 - December 1997)
- Negative Burn vol. 2 #1-21 (Desperado Publishing, May 2006 - June 2008)
- The Art of Brian Bolland (312 pages, Desperado Publishing, December 2006, ISBN 1-58240-603-0)

== Notes ==
Preceded by Rob Liefeld	Wolverine writer 2000	Succeeded by Frank Tieri
