= Barb Rausch =

Comics artist and writer

- Born: Barbara Ann Rausch; 7 June 1941
- Died: 14 June 2001 (aged 60)
- Areas: Cartoonist, Writer, Artist

Barbara Ann Rausch (1941–2001) was a Los Angeles-based comics artist and writer.

== Biography ==
Barb Rausch was born on 7 June 1941, and worked on a number of comic books, cartoons and newspaper comic strips. She worked on comic books including Barbie comics (Marvel Comics), The Desert Peach, and Omaha the Cat Dancer (Kitchen Sink Press), created work for Disney Studios, and was a continuing collaborator on Arn Saba's Neil the Horse. Rausch worked as an art teacher in Flint, Michigan during the early 1970s.
