= Charlton Bullseye =

Charlton Bullseye may refer to:

- Charlton Bullseye (comic), a comic produced by Charlton Comics
- Charlton Bullseye (fanzine), a fanzine by the CPL Gang
