= Wretch =

Wretch may refer to:

- Wretch (album), a 1991 album by Kyuss
- Wretch (website), a Taiwanese web log community
- The Wretch, a 2003 comic book by Phil Hester
- "Wretch", a song from the 2008 Protest the Hero album Fortress
- "Wretch", 2019 single by Autoheart

== See also ==
- Les Scélérats ("The Wretches"), 1960 French film
- Wretches, 2018 South Korean film
- Retching, also known as dry heaving
