= The Wretch =

- Cover to The Wretch Volume One: Everyday Doomsday.

Publication information
- Publisher: SLG Publishing
- First appearance: Negative Burn #23 (as "The Creep")
- Created by: Phil Hester

In-story information
- Alter ego: unknown

The Wretch is a comic book created by Phil Hester and published by Slave Labor Graphics. The series focuses on the creepy town of Glass City and its residents who are protected by a strange entity known only as the Wretch. Weird things can always be found in Glass City, such as aliens, black magic, and even psychotic clowns. But the Wretch is always there to stop these things. The Wretch originally appeared in Joe Pruett's anthology title Negative Burn, where he was called "The Creep." The Wretch then moved into his own four-issue series published by Caliber Comics, which was followed by a six-issue series published by Slave Labor Graphics. The Caliber series was nominated for an Eisner award for best new series.

== The character ==
Although he has appeared in many stories, little is known about the Wretch's history or powers. Phil Hester told Newsarama that "The Wretch is inscrutable, he – if it is a 'he'– never speaks, appears mysteriously, uses his ill-defined powers to solve a problem in a funky way, then fades back into the night." The stories generally focused on the people in Glass City that the Wretch helped.

In the Wretch's early appearances he wore belts all over his body and had two large hoses which connected from his back to the front of his neck. The hoses were shown at different times to emit strange liquids and/or gases. Later the Wretch's look was tweaked. The hoses and much of the "armored" look was eliminated in favor of bandages which were wrapped around his arms and neck. In both costumes the Wretch is always seen in silhouette.

== Collections ==
- The Wretch Volume One: Everyday Doomsday (collects the SLG/Amaze Ink run) | SC: ISBN 978-0-943151-68-7
- The Wretch Volume Two: Devil's Lullaby (collects the Caliber issues) | SC: ISBN 978-0-943151-72-4
- The Wretch Volume Three: From Cradle to Grave (collects various shorts stories) | SC: ISBN 978-0-943151-73-1
