= Mystery Men =

1999 American superhero comedy film

- Theatrical release poster
- Directed by: Kinka Usher
- Written by: Neil Cuthbert
- Based on: Flaming Carrot Comics by Bob Burden
- Produced by: Lawrence Gordon; Lloyd Levin; Mike Richardson
- Starring: Hank Azaria; Claire Forlani; Janeane Garofalo; Eddie Izzard; Greg Kinnear; William H. Macy; Kel Mitchell; Lena Olin; Paul Reubens; Geoffrey Rush; Ben Stiller; Wes Studi; Tom Waits
- Cinematography: Stephen H. Burum
- Edited by: Conrad Buff
- Music by: Stephen Warbeck
- Production companies: Golar Productions; Dark Horse Entertainment
- Distributed by: Universal Pictures
- Release dates: July 22, 1999 (Los Angeles); August 6, 1999 (United States)
- Running time: 120 minutes
- Country: United States
- Language: English
- Budget: $68 million
- Box office: $33.5 million

Mystery Men is a 1999 American superhero comedy film directed by Kinka Usher and written by Neil Cuthbert, based on Bob Burden's Flaming Carrot Comics. The film stars Hank Azaria, Claire Forlani, Janeane Garofalo, Eddie Izzard, Greg Kinnear, William H. Macy, Kel Mitchell, Lena Olin, Paul Reubens, Geoffrey Rush, Ben Stiller, Wes Studi, and Tom Waits. The story revolves around a team of lesser superheroes with unimpressive powers who are required to save the day from a criminal genius when Champion City's resident superhero gets captured. Mystery Men premiered in Los Angeles on July 22, 1999. The film received mixed reviews from critics and grossed $33 million worldwide against a $68 million budget, but was eventually acknowledged as a cult film.

== Plot ==
In Champion City, the amateur superhero team of Mr. Furious, the Shoveler, and the Blue Raja attempt to make a name for themselves, but their inexperience, infighting, and dubious abilities generally result in frustration while the city's powerful but arrogant superhero, Captain Amazing, consistently upstages them. However, Amazing's prowess has made his job obsolete, and his corporate sponsorships are drying up. To create a need for his services, Amazing uses his alter ego, billionaire lawyer Lance Hunt, to argue for the release of his supervillain nemesis, Casanova Frankenstein, from an insane asylum. But once released and reunited with his henchman Tony P and his Disco Boys, Casanova blows up the asylum, captures Amazing, and prepares to unleash the "Psycho-frakulator" machine to destroy the city.

On a stakeout of Casanova's mansion, Furious witnesses Amazing's capture and informs his team. After a failed rescue attempt, the three realize that they need more allies and recruit Invisible Boy, the Spleen, and the Bowler. Emboldened, they vandalize Casanova's limousine. In retaliation, the Disco Boys nearly kill them, but the Sphinx, an enigmatic superhero, saves them and agrees to train them. Furious grows annoyed by the Sphinx's unconventional team-building exercises and antimetabolic rhetoric and quits, while the others flourish under his tutelage. To improve their chances, they seek non-lethal weaponry invented by Doc Heller. Encouraged by Monica, his new girlfriend, Furious rejoins the team.

The group breaks into Casanova's mansion during a summit of the city's gangs to free Amazing. However, they become confused by his instructions and condescending attitude and inadvertently set off the Psycho-frakulator, killing him. The team despairs until the Shoveler inspires them to continue. Through a combination of surprise, teamwork, maximizing their powers, and Heller's weapons, the team successfully assaults Casanova's mansion and defeats his henchmen. However, Casanova takes Monica hostage and activates the Psycho-frakulator, which begins wreaking havoc on the city. While the team works to disable the machine, Furious unleashes his powers and throws Casanova into the Psycho-frakulator's core, killing him. The others help the Bowler destroy the machine and escape the mansion as it implodes.

Afterward, reporters swarm the team, demanding to know their group's name, which sparks an argument among them.

== Cast ==
- Ben Stiller as Roy / Mr. Furious, an amateur superhero who derives power from his rage, which enhances his strength and agility.
- Hank Azaria as Jeffery / Blue Raja, an amateur superhero with superhuman vision and accuracy, with throwing cutlery being his preferred method of attack.
- William H. Macy as Eddie / Shoveler, a quarry worker turned amateur superhero with superhuman agility and cunning who wields a shovel as a weapon.
- Greg Kinnear as Lance Hunt / Captain Amazing, Champion City's local superhero and a billionaire lawyer.
- Kel Mitchell as Invisible Boy, an amateur superhero who can become invisible if nobody is looking at him.
- Paul Reubens as Spleen, an amateur superhero whose flatulence makes others faint.
- Janeane Garofalo as Carol / Bowler, an amateur superhero with psychic powers and whose crystal bowling ball contains the skull of her dead father, Carmine the Bowler, who died fighting the Disco Boys.
- Wes Studi as The Sphinx, a mysterious superhero who can use his mind to cut weapons in half.
- Claire Forlani as Monica, a waitress and Roy's love interest.
- Geoffrey Rush as Casanova Frankenstein, a criminal genius.
- Lena Olin as Dr. Anabel Leek, Casanova's prison psychiatrist and love interest.
- Eddie Izzard as Tony P., Casanova's right-hand man and leader of the Disco Boys gang.
- Tom Waits as Doc Heller, a mad scientist who makes non-lethal weaponry.
- Artie Lange as Big Red, the leader of The Red Eyes gang.
- Ned Bellamy as Funk.
- Louise Lasser as Violet, Blue Raja's mother.
- Ricky Jay as Vic Weems, Captain Amazing's publicist.
- Jenifer Lewis as Lucille, the Shoveler's wife.
- Prakazrel Michel as Tony C., a member of the Disco Boys.
- Goodie Mob as The Not-So-Goody Mob, a Champion City gang and allies of Casanova.

Additionally, Corbin Bleu and Philip Bolden respectively appear as Butch and Roland, the Shoveler and Lucille's sons. Television personality Riki Rachtman and filmmaker Michael Bay appear as members of the Frat Boys gang. Legendary stuntman and martial artist Gene LeBell appeared as a member of The Suit gangmen. Composer Mark Mothersbaugh appears as a band leader while Sung Kang, in his film debut, and Monet Mazur have small roles as Susie and Becky Beaner, respectively. Additionally, Dane Cook, Doug Jones, Vincent Bowman, and Dana Gould make minor appearances as superhero auditionees the Waffler, Pencilhead, Son of Pencilhead, and Squeegeeman.

== Production ==
=== Development ===
In 1997, Mike Richardson, publisher of Dark Horse Comics, pitched the "Mystery Men" concept to producers Larry Gordon and Lloyd Levin at Universal. "My first impression was just how relatable the characters are," Levin said "Bob [Burden] has a real surrealistic sensibility, but at the core of his work is something that's thematically so identifiable. I think there is an almost childlike persistence of all the characters. And they ultimately hold on to the conviction that with courage and sacrifice, they can become what they dream."

The film was announced in mid-1997 along with a raft of comic book adaptations including Blade, Virus, Superman Lives, X-Men, The Fantastic Four, The Hulk, Captain America, The Sub-Mariner, Iron Man, Daredevil and Silver Surfer, Hellboy, Concrete, Green Hornet and 26 other titles.

That fall, Danny DeVito was in talks for a $13-million deal to both star and direct, but negotiations broke down over who would produce the soundtrack. "It was a big deal for me," DeVito said. "I really wanted it, so I walked away from the project." Ben Stiller was then approached to rewrite the script and direct but eventually turned it down. "I decided I didn't want to do it," he explained, "because it was just too much. It was a huge movie I'd be taking on."

Commercial director Kinka Usher was signed in April 1998 to direct. As of 2026, it remains his only feature-length directorial effort. Usher had won awards for the "Got Milk?" and Taco Bell Chihuahua campaigns. Usher, who had been approached for other films, was discouraged when he saw the script for Mystery Men. "I thought it was boring," he said. "However, the premise was great." He continued, "Most of the movies made by commercial directors are heavy on visuals and thin on content. I don't want to be a part of that. I was very cognizant of showing that I know how to work with character."

=== Casting ===
Garofalo signed on and persuaded Stiller to appear in the film. "I met Kinka and he was nice and funny and the money was good, so I decided to do it," she said. "I had to twist Ben's arm because he's always so busy."

Stiller was originally offered the Blue Raja role, but was not interested in playing what he called a "nerdy guy" again. "The minute you start doing the same thing in comedy, people go, 'Oh, I've seen that,'" he said. He took the role of Mr. Furious but explained, "In the original script, he was just angry all the time, but I thought that would be boring, so one of the changes I made is that he has the least power. Like if we're a band, I'm the guy who started the band but who's also the least talented."

Geoffrey Rush was cast in what was his first Hollywood film in July, followed by Azaria, Reubens, Forlani and Macy. Lena Olin was added in August; Greg Kinnear in October; and Eddie Izzard in November. Ving Rhames had been the initial choice for Shoveler. Vince Vaughn had also been in consideration for a role.

For Reubens, it marked his first major film role since he retreated from the public eye earlier in the decade after he was caught masturbating in an X-rated movie theater, though he still would not perform as Pee-wee Herman for another decade. His promotion of the film on The Tonight Show with Jay Leno marked one of his first public appearances as himself as opposed to Herman since the early 1980s.

=== Writing ===
Reubens said, "I liked the idea. I hadn't seen it before. I loved the cast that was assembled by the time I came into it, and I thought the script was fun, smart and goofy all at the same time." Regarding his character, he said, "I felt I was playing the character as kind of slow, but when I saw the movie it didn't seem like that at all. I don't know what that says."

According to Stiller, the script was fluid. "The script was being reworked all the time by... everybody! Because everybody kind of wanted to personalize their part, and try to make it as funny as possible. So yeah, that was welcome. That was the idea we had going in, to just have everybody kind of get together and try to make it as funny as we could. Especially in the context of a big action, special effects type movie. You know, a lot of the time what gets lost is the specific character stuff, and the small moments that really have to work for the whole thing to work. So that's what we were concentrating on as much as possible. And it's good if everybody's on board with that, you know what I mean? And I think Hank, myself and Paul and Janeane were probably most involved in that process, for our characters. We're used to working that way."

Usher said, "We did a lot of unscripted stuff. I let Ben and Janeane go. They were totally free." Usher said he wanted "the film to look flat, like a comic book. I tried to capture that alternate reality but keep the edgy humor."

=== Filming ===
Shooting began on October 21, 1998, in Los Angeles, and was completed the following April. "I thought it would be quick, but it ended up being this six month shoot," Stiller recalled.

Bob Burden was on the set for some of the shoot, answering questions that came up about his creations. "There were times when we were kind of stumped in a scene and we asked him what he thought," Levin said. "The great thing about him is that 10 minutes later, we'd get 30 pages in the fax machine with probably 29 pages filled with the lousiest ideas that you've ever read but that one page of pure genius."

Hank Azaria, when asked about the film in 2011, noted the toughness of the production in regards to the effects and actors present, which fell on Usher in particular:

It was so difficult for him that… it was self-inflicted. He said, "You know, I didn’t enjoy this." I think he was a genius commercial filmmaker, he got shitloads of money for making commercials, and he even said in the middle of making the film, "I'm going back to commercials when this is done. I've had enough. I'd much rather do my cool little one-minute shorts that I make than deal with all this nonsense."

The original ending was unpopular with test audiences, so Usher shot a new one with what he called "a big-cheer finish."

== Music ==
The musical score for Mystery Men was composed by Stephen Warbeck. Written within a 28-day time span, the score was recorded on the Sony Scoring Stage. "I was quite liberal in the choice of instruments, because I've chosen a couple of Hungarian instruments, the tárogató and the cimbalom, and also a Greek instrument, the bouzouki," said Warbeck on the film's range of sounds. "And then Mike Fisher and the other percussionists have brought along an exciting range of stuff which are so interesting and varied that we keep picking bits of those and adding them in." After Warbeck's contributions were completed, the film's producers decided to alter various scenes. Because of this, composer Shirley Walker was brought in to create additional music and rearrange Warbeck's score to fit the new running time.

A soundtrack album was released on July 6, 1999, by Interscope Records. the album spawned two singles, "All Star", and "Who Are Those Mystery Men".

The soundtrack album's first single, the recently recorded "All Star" by the California rock band Smash Mouth (which was heard during the end credits of the movie) became a critically and massively successful international hit after their manager Robert Hayes licensed it for the film's official soundtrack. And to promote it, a music video directed by McG was made featuring footage from the film. It became their signature song, peaking at number 4 on the Billboard Hot 100, nominated for the Best Pop Performance by a Duo or Group with Vocals at the 42nd Annual Grammy Awards, and it was later licensed to be used in many films, TV shows, commercials and more.

Track listing
No.	Title	Artist	Length
1.	"Back In 1999"	John Oszajca	3:45
2.	"All Star"	Smash Mouth	3:19
3.	"Keep Keep Movin'"	Dub Pistols	3:42
4.	"The Mystery Men Mantra" (feat. Terry Bradford, Will Wheaton & Nancye Ferguson)	Mark Mothersbaugh	4:11
5.	"No Way"	Freak Power	4:14
6.	"Who Are Those Mystery Men"	Kel and the M.A.F.T. Emcees Feat. Romaine Jones	4:08
7.	"Rainy Day Parade"	Jill Sobule	3:05
8.	"Sometimes"	Michael Franti & Spearhead	3:48
9.	"Won't You Come Down"	Spy	4:04
10.	"Gangsters"	Citizen King	2:43
11.	"No More Heroes"	Violent Femmes	2:54
12.	"Indigo"	Moloko	3:34
13.	"Disco Inferno"	The Trammps	3:34
14.	"Night Fever"	Bee Gees	3:30
15.	"Mystery Men Oath"	Ben Stiller & William H. Macy	0:42

Additional songs featured in the film include:

- "Planet Claire" – The B-52s
- "O Mio Babbino Caro" (Composed by Giacomo Puccini) – Miriam Gauci
- "Play That Funky Music" – Wild Cherry
- "A Fifth of Beethoven" - Walter Murphy and the Big Apple Band

== Release ==
=== Box office ===
Universal delayed the film's release one week to avoid competing with the opening of The Blair Witch Project. In its opening weekend, Mystery Men grossed $10,017,865, ranking number six at the domestic box office. By the end of its run, on October 14, the film had grossed $29,762,011 domestically and $3,699,000 internationally, for a worldwide total of $33,461,011.

=== Critical response ===
Review aggregator site Rotten Tomatoes gives the film a score of 59% based on 103 reviews, with an average rating of 5.80/10. The site's consensus states: "Absurd characters and quirky gags are brought to life by a talented cast, providing this superhero spoof with lots of laughs." On Metacritic, the film has a 65 out of 100 rating based on reviews from 24 critics, indicating "generally favorable reviews". Audiences polled by CinemaScore gave the film an average grade of "C+" on an A+ to F scale.

Godfrey Cheshire for Variety thought the film "may contain more yuks than the summer's other big pop sendup, the second Austin Powers, but it also spreads them over an ultimately tiresome two hours...Though pic boasts several action sequences that are expertly handled and laden with dazzling effects, its most engaging passages by far are the ones focusing on the central sextets' banter and interaction." Kenneth Turan of the Los Angeles Times wrote, "Watching Mystery Men is a bit like sitting next to a brilliant person at a dinner party who just won't shut up. Because this film is so self-conscious and, like Mr. Furious and friends, has a tendency to try too hard, it's an effort you end up admiring more than completely loving. Influenced by its betters, films such as Brazil, Buckaroo Banzai and even Blade Runner, it's destined to join them all in cult film heaven."

Jonathan Romney for Sight & Sound said that it was "a desperately hit-and-miss affair". Michael Dequina of The Movie Report said that it "fails to come up with worthy gags and one-liners for the able cast." Steve Murray of Cox News Service gave it a negative review, saying "Mystery Men is like its hapless heroes. It's a wannabe that has the best intentions – including a pronounced anti-gun stance – but none of the knack it takes to save the day, or itself."

Newsday wrote, "'Mystery Men' manages to exalt both the terminally weird and the frighteningly mundane with such flamboyant good spirits that you overlook its occasional dead zones and dull patches. Try as it might to prop up its static plot, the movie is more comic revue than action comedy. Viewed within these parameters, 'Mystery Men' is as satisfying as a heaping helping of Abbott-and-Costello shorts. And much smarter than the average doofus blockbuster." British television channel Film4 gave the film 3.5 out of 5 stars, saying it was "Hugely entertaining – especially for those with a thing for superheroes."

== Legacy ==
While Mystery Men was not a hit during release, it has been acknowledged as a cult film. Cast members have generally expressed interest in returning to their roles for a sequel, while acknowledging the unlikelihood of such a sequel happening.

Janeane Garofalo kept her character's skull bowling ball after filming, and enjoys using it as a Halloween decoration.
