= Charlton Bullseye (comics) =

1981–1982 comic book series

- Charlton Bullseye #1. Art by Bob McLeod and Dan Reed.

Publication information
- Publisher: Charlton Comics
- Schedule: Monthly
- Format: Ongoing series
- Publication date: June 1981 – December 1982
- No. of issues: 10

Charlton Bullseye is a Charlton Comics showcase comic book series that was published from June 1981 through December 1982. Several new stories using Charlton's "Action Heroes" appeared, before they were sold to DC Comics in 1983. After the cancellation of Charlton Bullseye, stories intended for the title were published in Scary Tales #36–40, which explains the superhero story "Mr. Jigsaw" in issue #38 and "Dragon Force" in issue #40. Several other unpublished stories for the title were published by AC Comics.

According to the 1980 press release for the series, an artist showed up at the Charlton offices and offered to work for them for free in hopes of accumulating enough credits to get a job with one of the two leading comics publishers. Charlton Bullseye was based around this concept; contributors to the series were paid only in contributor copies, all original art was returned to the artists after publication, and contributors would hold the copyrights to any original characters they introduced.

== Issues ==
1. Blue Beetle and the Question. Art by Dan Reed.
2. "Funny animal" stories, featuring the first appearance of Neil the Horse, by Arn Saba.
3. Swords and sorcery/science fiction
4. The Vanguards (all-woman super team), by Larry Houston.
5. The Barbarian, Warhund. Art by Chas Truog and colors by Wendy Fiore.
6. Michael Mauser. Story by Rick Burchett.
7. Captain Atom, with art by Dan Reed; and Nightshade, by Bill Black.
8. Horror stories
9. "Bludd, the Ultimate Barbarian", a science fiction barbarian story. Art partially done by Gene Day.
10. Thunder Bunny, by Martin L. Greim.

== Attempted revivals ==
In 1985, a final attempt at a revival was spearheaded by new editor T.C. Ford with a direct-market only version of Charlton Bullseye Special, which featured work by then newcomers Amanda Conner, T.C. Ford, and Chris Pridgen. United Comics, T.C. Ford's publishing house, reprinted this edition as Shockwave #1 in 2016.
