= Living Monolith =

Marvel Comics fictional character

The Living Monolith
- The Living Monolith as depicted in X-Men (vol. 2) #94 (November 1999). Art by Alan Davis.

Publication information
- Publisher: Marvel Comics
- First appearance: The X-Men #54 (March 1969)
- Created by: Arnold Drake; Don Heck

In-story information
- Alter ego: Ahmet Abdol
- Species: Human mutant
- Team affiliations: Cult of the Living Monolith; The Twelve
- Partnerships: Plasma
- Notable aliases: Living Pharaoh; Living Planet
- Abilities: Energy absorption and projection Superhuman strength, durability and longevity Size and mass manipulation Telepathy

The Living Monolith (Ahmet Abdol) is a supervillain appearing in American comic books published by Marvel Comics. He was created by writer Arnold Drake and artist Don Heck, and first appeared in The X-Men #54 (March 1969).

Abdol is the Living Pharaoh while in his normal appearance, but once he obtained enough cosmic energy, he would increase in mass, size, and power, thus becoming the Living Monolith.

Abdol has mainly been an X-Men villain, usually using Havok to become the Living Monolith. He has also used other superheroes, including the Fantastic Four (who gained their super powers from exposure to cosmic rays). He even killed his own daughter to achieve his goal.

== Fictional character biography ==
Ahmet Abdol was born in Cairo, Egypt. He is a professor of Egyptology and archeologist who possesses the ability to manipulate cosmic energy, mainly by absorbing it and projecting it as energy blasts. Deciding to use his powers for his own personal gain, Abdol creates a cult around himself as the messiah, the Cult of the Living Pharaoh, and becomes a supervillain, intending to rule all of Earth.

Abdol discovers that another mutant, Havok (Alex Summers, brother to Scott Summers also known as Cyclops) could absorb and project cosmic energy more easily than him. Abdol kidnaps Havok and uses him to increase his power, then battles the X-Men. He transforms into the Living Monolith and battles the X-Men in this form. He is captured by Sentinels, but escapes.

Later, Abdol abducts Mister Fantastic, the Invisible Woman, and the Human Torch to absorb cosmic radiation from their bodies, growing to a massive size. Thor throws Abdol into outer space, where he becomes a "Living Planet," similar to Ego.

It is later revealed that Abdol's formerly dormant mutant powers were activated by a procedure performed on him by Mister Sinister. Sinister spliced genes from Alex Summers into his genome, thus giving Abdol the ability to absorb cosmic energy. Since his powers were modified to become genetically similar to Havok's, this explained why their abilities symbiotically interfered with one another's. Abdol is found by Bishop and Deathbird floating in space. Deathbird betrays Bishop and brings Abdol to Apocalypse, who uses his body as an energy container during The Twelve story arc.

When the Crimson Gem of Cyttorak reappears on Earth and sends out a call to individuals suitable to become a new Juggernaut, Abdol hears the call and makes his way to the Temple of Cyttorak. Amidst conflict between demonic guardians of the Gem, the X-Men, and several prospective and former candidates for the Juggernaut's power, Abdol manages to claim the Gem. He loses his powers when Cyttorak returns his power to his former host, Cain Marko.

== Powers and abilities ==
Ahmet Abdol possesses the mutant ability to absorb cosmic energy, transforming him into the Living Monolith. After genetically augmenting himself, he gains the additional ability to empower himself by absorbing energy and psychic abilities that enable him to read and control the minds of others. Additionally, he is a skilled scientist specializing in archaeology, genetics, and radiation.

== In other media ==
- The Living Monolith appears as a boss in X-Men.
- The Living Monolith appears as a boss in X-Men Legends II: Rise of Apocalypse, voiced by Dwight Schultz.
- Ahmet Abdol as the Living Monolith and Living Pharaoh appears as a boss in Marvel Avengers Alliance.
