= Ken Lopez =

Letterer and logo designer

- Born: September 4, 1963 (age 63)
- Areas: Lettering, Logo Design
- Notable works: Computer lettering DC Art Director for Lettering; DC Cover Editor; Superman: The Man of Steel; JLA

Ken Lopez (born September 4) is a letterer and logo designer for the comic book industry. A pioneer of computer lettering, Lopez designed the fonts for DC Comics's in-house lettering unit, and is currently DC's art director for lettering and its cover editor.

== Lettering ==
=== Marvel ===
Lopez began his lettering career as a freelancer for Marvel Comics in 1986, rapidly rising to prominence for his speed and creativity. From 1989 to 1996, Lopez was the regular letterer on a number of Marvel titles, including Marc Spector: Moon Knight, The Punisher, Guardians of the Galaxy, Deathlok, and X-Men 2099. His tenure on Guardians of the Galaxy lasted five years.

=== Valiant ===
In 1992–1994, Lopez lettered for a number of Valiant Comics titles, including Magnus, Robot Fighter and almost the entire run of X-O Manowar.

=== DC ===
From 1994 to 2005, Lopez moved to DC, where he was regular letterer on a number of titles, including Superman: The Man of Steel, The Batman Chronicles, Resurrection Man, JLA, Young Justice, JSA, and Harley Quinn. Lopez lettered Superman: The Man of Steel for nine years, and JLA for eight years. Lopez also lettered the landmark limited series Identity Crisis. With Lopez's ascension to DC's art director of lettering in 2004, his output has understandably decreased.

== Logos ==
Lopez has designed logos for such titles (among others) as Marvel's Wally the Wizard (1985), Iron Man (1985), Classic X-Men (1986), Comet Man (1987), Excalibur (1988), and Spider-Man 2099 (1992); and DC's Green Lantern (1994 and revised in 2002), Green Lantern Corps (2006), and Justice League of America (2006). In addition, as DC's cover editor, Lopez solicits new logos from freelancers, and modifies existing designs. He continues to create fonts while training others.

== Personal life ==
Lopez lives in Manhattan.

== Selected bibliography ==
- Marc Spector: Moon Knight (Marvel, 1989–1993)
- The Punisher (Marvel, 1989–1993)
- Guardians of the Galaxy (Marvel, 1990–1995)
- Deathlok (Marvel, 1991–1994)
- X-O Manowar (Valiant, 1992–1994)
- X-Men 2099 (Marvel, 1993–1996)
- Superman: Man of Steel (DC, 1994–2003)
- The Batman Chronicles (DC, 1995–2000)
- Resurrection Man (DC, 1997–1999)
- JLA (DC, 1997–2005)
- Young Justice (DC, 1998–2003)
- JSA (DC, 1999–2005)
- Harley Quinn (DC, 2000–2002)
