= X-Men Black =

Comic book limited series

- First issue of X-Men: Black. Art by J. Scott Campbell.

Publication information
- Publisher: Marvel Comics
- Format: Limited series
- Genre: Superhero
- Publication date: October 3 – October 31, 2018
- No. of issues: 5

Creative team
- Written by: Chris Claremont; Geraldo Borges; Zac Thompson; Seanan McGuire; Robbie Thompson; Leah Williams
- Artist(s): Geraldo Borges; Dalibor Talajic; Nick Bradshaw; Marco Failla; Shawn Crystal; Chris Bachalo
- Editor(s): Darren Shan; Chris Robinson; Jordan D. White

Collected editions
- X-Men: Black: ISBN 9781302915537

X-Men Black is a five-issue comic book anthology series published weekly by Marvel Comics in October 2018, consisting of one-shot issues, each focusing on an X-Men antagonist: Magneto, Mojo, Mystique, Juggernaut, and Emma Frost.

== Publication history ==
X-Men Black is the third "color-themed X-title", following X-Men Blue and X-Men Gold. X-Men Black was first announced at the X-Men panel at San Diego Comic-Con. Marvel revealed that X-Men Black would be an entire line of one-shot comics rather than a single series. Each issue is headlined by a mutant villain and features its own creative team, while all covers were illustrated by J. Scott Campbell. Each one-shot also includes "backup stories" titled The "Degeneration", focusing on Apocalypse, written by Lonnie Nadler.

The initial announcement only revealed the title and cover of the first issue, which featured Magneto. This led to confusion and speculation that the project would be an ongoing series centered on Magneto. Marvel later clarified that X-Men Black was intended to be a weekly anthology-limited series that starring multiple characters.

== Issues ==
The characters and their respective creative teams were as follows:

- Magneto #1 — Written by Chris Claremont and illustrated by Dalibor Talajic, it was released on October 3, 2018. The issue begins with Magneto in a diner, where he starts a conversation with a waitress named Kate. Shortly afterward, he gets into a fight with "some ignorant locals", during which he hears a news report on the television behind him stating that the Office of National Emergency (O.N.E.) has built three detention centers across the country, intended to detain young mutants for "processing". In response, Magneto launches an attack on the O.N.E. Critic Nathaniel Muir notes the use of the "discrimination" theme, something he finds common in Claremont's work.
- Mojo #1 – Written by Scott Aukerman, and illustrated by Nick Bradshaw, it was released on October 10, 2018. It begins with Mojo leaving his "underground hideout to do reconnaissance" in New York City. The issue is described as a "bad boy trying to find love" storyline, presenting a "lighthearted...funny" story.
- Mystique #1 – Written by Seanan McGuire and illustrated by Marco Failla, it was released on October 17, 2018. The issue is described as a "little heist story" that shows the title character's "wry sense of humor". Throughout the story, the reader gets inside Mystique's head, providing a running commentary on what is happening.
- Juggernaut #1 – Written by Robbie Thompson and illustrated by Shawn Crystal, it was released on October 24, 2018. Juggernaut is tasked with finding a series of "familiar foes", including the X-Men. As he does so, he is forced to confront his "inner demons", sensing that something is wrong. Still, he pushes forward with his "impossible fight" against the X-Men.
- Emma Frost #1 – Written by Leah Williams and illustrated by Chris Bachalo and Borges, it was released on October 31, 2018. The issue is set after the Inhumans vs. X-Men event, where Emma Frost was turned into a villain. This issue uses dark humor as it focuses on the title character as she infiltrates the Hellfire Club, having concluded that the Club is responsible for much of the conflict between mutants and humans. She decides that the only "rational course of action is to destroy [it]", which requires confronting the Black King, Sebastian Shaw. This confrontation is depicted through a series of escalating scenes described as "funny and frightening". Critic Jamie Lovett noted that, "rather than try[ing] to redeem Emma or reduce her to a simple villain, Williams has Emma walk her own path, making use of her gifts in intelligent and subtle ways to position herself a major player in the mutant world".

== Reception ==
According to Diamond Comic Distributors U.S. estimates for comic specialty store sales in October 2018, X-Men Black one-shots performed well. X-Men Black: Emma Frost ranked 23rd with estimated sales of 55,731 copies, making it the highest-selling title in the line. It was followed by X-Men Black: Magneto, which placed 31st with 49,660 estimated copies sold. This was followed by X-Men Black: Mystique, which ranked 42nd with estimated sales of 43,039 copies. X-Men Black: Juggernaut came in at 45th with 41,092 copies, while X-Men Black: Mojo ranked 52nd, selling an estimated 37,034 copies. AIPT gave the X-Men Black trade paperback, released in 2019, a rating of 7 out of 10, describing it as a "mostly good collection of villain-centric stories that gives the characters actual arcs and makes them feel three-dimensional".

ComicBook.com's Jamie Lovett gave the debut issue, X-Men Black: Magneto, a rating of 3 out of 5, criticizing Chris Claremont's characterization of Magneto as a villain, which he said "feels all over the place". Lovett argued that Claremont seems forced to justify "every thought and action Magneto takes, painting a picture of the character that feels both incomplete and contradictory". AIPT's Nathaniel Muir gave it a rating of 7 out of 10, noting that while "no one writes Magneto better than Chris Claremont", the story felt "too short and typical" to fully develop its heavy themes. Muir also criticized Dalibor Talajić's artwork, noting that unlike previous depictions that gave Magneto an "air of royalty and power", Talajić made him look like a "feeble man", which he felt did not fit the character's portrayal as a powerful character. Contrarily, The Beat staff found the issue "very long" and unoriginal, noting that some depictions, like Magneto's mutant supremacist trope, were outdated. Talajić's art was praised as "simplistic and minimalist"; however, they also felt that he is not the best choice to illustrate a Magneto solo story. Comic Book Resources' Matt Lune found that "Claremont and Talajic provide an interesting character focus that, while not necessarily breaking any new ground, reinforces Magneto's situation and pushes him forward with a new objective and a potential new character or two".

For the second issue, X-Men Black: Mojo, AIPT's Muir gave it a rating of 8.5 out of 10, praising Aukerman's writing of the story's "bad boy trying to find love" narrative, describing it as a "success". He noted that the issue employed familiar tropes, creating a sense of "certain comfort in familiarity". The artwork by Nick Bradshaw and André Lima Araújo was praised as it had a "borderline sinister and cold feel to it. As the issue progresses, it becomes more colorful and more cartoon-like to fit the bubbly tale". ComicBook.com's Lovett gave the issue a rating of 4 out of 5, praising the creative team for turning "the lord of the Mojoverse into an effective cipher for the perpetually disgruntled corners of fandom". The Beat staff found the issue "weird" and juvenile, but enjoyable as it progressed.

For the third issue, X-Men Black: Mystique, AIPT’s Muir gave it a rating of 9 out of 10, found it a "great issue" and described it as straddling "the middle ground between the previous two issues, though it definitely leans toward the more serious side" He also praised Marco Failla's artwork, noting his attention to the smallest details. ComicBook.com's Lovett gave it a rating of 3 out of 5, while he praised Failla’s artwork, he criticized how the story lacks a "real standout moment".

For the fourth issues X-Men Black: Juggernaut, AIPT’s gave it a rating of 8 out of 10, Muir described it as a "mixed bag", much like X-Men Black: Mojo, using a "traditional setup " to tell a "great story". He noted that the art is "hit and miss", with some good scenes balanced by "oddly rendered ones". ComicBook.com's Lovett gave it a rating of 3 out of 5, finding it to be a typical issue that adds nothing new. He noted that Shawn Crystal’s art delivers some "stellar compositions and Rico Renzi’s colors aptly differentiate reality from the mental plane but are a bit garish at times, particularly when used on Crystal’s sparse background".

AIPT's Muir gave the final issue, X-Men Black: Emma Frost an 8.5 out of 10, calling it "a great ending to the series of one-shots.. exciting and filled with dark humor that highlights just how great a character Emma is". ComicBook.com's Lovett gave it a 4 out of 5, noting that it progresses its title character in a "new and interesting direction" and calling the issue "essential" reading for fans of the character and enjoyable for all readers. He also praised Chris Bachalo’s "signature sense of design and unorthodox framing techniques", although Bachalo was assisted by a large team of inkers and colorists. As a result, Lovett found it wasn’t Bachalo’s "sharpest-looking work" and noted some inconsistencies but still sees it as "stellar-looking comics". Both Comic Book Resources' Lune and PopMatters' Jack Fisher praised Leah Williams's portrayal of Emma, as well as Bachalo's artwork.
