= Negative Burn =

Black-and-white anthology comic book

- The cover to Negative Burn (vol. 1) #1 (1993).

Publication information
- Publisher: Caliber Press; Image Comics; Desperado Publishing
- Schedule: Monthly
- Format: Ongoing series
- Publication date: (vol. 1); January 1993 – December 1997 (vol. 2); May 2006 – June 2008
- No. of issues: (vol. 1); 50 (vol. 2); 21
- Editor: Joe Pruett

Collected editions
- The Best of Negative Burn, Year One: ISBN 0-941613-69-0
- The Best of Negative Burn, Year Two: ISBN 0941613844
- The Best from 1993-1998: ISBN 1582404526

Negative Burn is a black-and-white anthology comic book published beginning in 1993 by Caliber Press, and subsequently by Image Comics and Desperado Publishing. Edited by Joe Pruett, Negative Burn is noted for its eclectic range of genres, mixture of established comics veterans and new talents, and promotion of creative experimentation.

== Publication history ==
=== Volume 1 (1993–1997) ===
The first volume of Negative Burn lasted 50 issues from January 1993 to December 1997. During that period it was nominated for the Best Anthology Harvey Award from 1994 to 1997, and for the Eisner Award for Best Anthology in both 1997 and 1999.

=== Volume 2 (2005–2008) ===
Revived in 2005 with two seasonal specials, Negative Burn returned to a monthly format in 2006. The first eleven issues of the new volume were published by Image Comics, while the final ten issues were published by Desperado Publishing.

During its 2005–2008 revival, editor/publisher Joe Pruett positioned Negative Burn as a platform for emerging creators, with the aim of helping them move on to larger or more established projects within the publisher’s catalog. He described the series as “a way for a new creator to break in ... such as Dalibor Talajic and Federico Dallocchio with Deadworld and Will Volley with Antoine Sharp," adding that promising contributors might later be paired with established creators or titles.

While the revival benefited from the series' name recognition from the 1990s, it nevertheless experienced the gradual sales decline typical of the period; volume 2 of Negative Burn ended in June 2008 with issue #21.

=== Revival attempts and ultimate publication (2009–2026) ===
The title was slated to return in 2009 as a 200-page annual trade paperback anthology from Desperado. Delayed when Desperado was absorbed by IDW Publishing in late 2009, the title was re-solicited by IDW in 2010, but ultimately canceled without ever being published.

Pruett revived the anthology in 2026, crowdfunded on Zoop.

== Contents ==
A typical issue of Negative Burn might include a number of stand-alone stories; a new chapter of a longer, serialized piece; recurring features such as Brian Bolland's "Mr. Mamoulian"; and a sketchbook section. The sketchbook featured studies, rough drawings, and never-before-seen artwork by a single illustrator. Artists such as Dave Dorman, Michael William Kaluta, David Mazzucchelli, Terry Moore, P. Craig Russell, Greg Ruth, Charles Vess, and even Neil Gaiman have been featured in the sketchbook section.

== Creators ==
Notable Negative Burn contributors include Brian Bolland, Alan Moore, P. Craig Russell, Doug Wheeler, Dave Johnson, Dave Gibbons, Evan Dorkin, Phil Hester, Arthur Adams, Edvin Biuković, Bob Burden, Zander Cannon, Mark Chiarello, Guy Davis, Michael Gaydos, Dean Haspiel, Darko Macan, Mike Wieringo, Terry Moore, Brian Michael Bendis, Josh Neufeld, Ron Kasman, Patton Oswalt, Paul Pope, Jim Mahfood, Moebius, Roxanne Starr, Mike Perkins and Tony Harris.

== Awards ==
Negative Burn has been nominated for over twenty comics industry awards, including the Harvey Award, the Eisner Award, the Eagle Award, the Don Thompson Award, and many others. In addition, the collection Negative Burn: The Best from 1993-1998 was named by Diamond Comic Distributors' Scoop e-newsletter as a Top Ten Trade Paperback of 2005.

== Collected editions ==
- The Best of Negative Burn, Year One (128 pages, Caliber Press, 1994, Stabur Press, 1995, ISBN 0-941613-69-0)
- The Best of Negative Burn, Year Two (128 pages, Caliber Press, 1995, Stabur Press, 1996, ISBN 0-941613-84-4)
- Negative Burn: The Best from 1993-1998 (200 pages, Image Comics, 1999, ISBN 1-58240-452-6, 2005, ISBN 1-58240-441-0)
