= Kinka Usher =

French director of television director

- Born: 1960 (age 65–66); France
- Occupation: Director
- Years active: 1984–present

Kinka Usher is a director of television commercials. He also directed the 1999 feature film Mystery Men.

== Early life ==
Kinka Usher was born in Nice, France, one of five children. His mother, an Italian by birth, owned a ballet production company and his father was a museum exhibit designer. Growing up he spent his time between Europe (primarily the island of Capri, Italy) and the United States (primarily Santa Barbara). During these early years he explored a career in the restaurant business, in the back of the house, and ultimately attaining the status of Sous-chef.

== Career ==
Entering the film industry at 23, he began as a production assistant at Harmony Pictures in Los Angeles, working up to camera assistant, Steadicam operator, and eventually a director/cameraman. His big break came when he was hired as a cameraman for one of Roger Corman's films.

His directorial debut came in 1992 on "Aborigine," a spot for Acura which earned him a Belding Award. Three years later, he opened House of Usher, and by 1997 he had four gold Lions from the Cannes International Festival and clients from around the world. The following year he received the Directors Guild of America Award for Best Commercial Director. His extensive list of credits includes spots for Taco Bell, Nike, Got Milk?, Nissan, Miller Lite, Polaroid and Pepsi.

In 1999, he crossed over from commercials to film, directing Mystery Men for Universal Studios. He subsequently returned to directing commercials, including a Bridgestone ad featured in the 2011 Super Bowl.

== Personal life ==
In February 2022, he sold his Montecito seaside mansion he had built in 2014 called Villa Tragara, modeled after the Alhambra palace in Granada, Spain, to Ellen DeGeneres for $22 million, down from the original listing price of $35 million.

== Awards ==
- Directors Guild of America - 1998 Best Commercial Director
- Nine Cannes Lions - Gold, Silver, and Bronze
- Five AICP Awards
- Clio Awards - 5 Gold, 1 Silver, and 2 Bronze
