= Strawberry Jam Comics =

Defunct Canadian comics publisher

- Industry: Comics
- Founded: 1985
- Founder: paul Stockton and Derek McCulloch
- Defunct: 1992
- Headquarters: Edmonton, Alberta, Canada
- Key people: Mike Bannon, Simon Tristam

Strawberry Jam Comics was a Canadian publisher of comic books during the black-and-white comics boom of the mid and late 1980s. Inspired by the creative success of Dave Sim's Cerebus the Aardvark, founders paul Stockton and Derek McCulloch launched Strawberry Jam with the publication of To Be Announced #1 in 1985. The commercial success of Kevin Eastman and Peter Laird's Teenage Mutant Ninja Turtles provided further inspiration.

Strawberry Jam never achieved significant renown or commercial success, and folded in 1992 after seven years of intermittent publication. Strawberry Jam's series night life has been recalled by some observers as a precursor to the style of writer-driven comics later to emerge from DC Comics' Vertigo imprint.

== Titles ==
- To Be Announced (7 issues, written by Derek McCulloch, drawn by Mike Bannon)
- night life (7 issues, written by Derek McCulloch, drawn by Simon Tristam)
- Open Season (7th issue, written and drawn by Jim Bricker; first six published by Renegade Press)
- Oombah, Jungle Moon Man (1 issue, written and drawn by Mike Bannon)
