= The Silent Invasion (comics) =

American comic book series

The Silent Invasion is a series of black and white graphic novels written by Larry Hancock and drawn by Michael Cherkas, both of whom live in Toronto.

The story is set in the early 1950s and combines McCarthy-era Cold War-type paranoia with flying saucers and alien abductions. It follows the adventures of newspaper reporter Matt Sinkage as he tries to solve the conspiracy and the powerful people trying to stop him.

The first series consisted of twelve issues published by Renegade Press between 1986 and 1988.

Reprints were published in the 1980s (sorted by date):

- TPB vol. 3: Tarnished Dreams. April 1987, published by Renegade.
- HC vol. 1: Secret Affairs. May 1988, NBM Publishing (reprinting #1-3).
- HC vol. 2: Red Shadows. August 1988, NBM (reprinting #4-6).
- HC vol. 3: Tarnished Dreams. March 1989, NBM (reprinting #7-9).
- TPB vol. 4: The Great Fear. April 1989, Renegade.
- HC vol. 4: The Great Fear. July 1989, NBM (reprinting #10-12).

In 1996, Caliber Comics published a six-issue series (May 1996-December 1996) which reprinted the first six issues published by Renegade, but with new covers and extra material.

In 1998, Caliber published The Silent Invasion, Abductions #1, dated May 1998, which didn't get past the first issue, but was reprinted & continued as Secret Messages in 2001 by NBM.

In 1999, NBM published Silent Invasion: Secret Affairs and Red Shadows TPB, October 1999 (reprinting first 6 issues of 1986 series).

In 2001, NBM started publishing Secret Messages a five-issue series (May 2001-May 2002). The first issue being a reprint of The Silent Invasion, Abductions #1.

In 2018, NBM started publishing a series of new editions of Silent Invasion. The first two books have reprinted the original volumes, the third book will collect "the never before collected third album" (presumably Secret Messages), and the fourth book will be "all-new".

The books have received reviews from publications including Publishers Weekly, School Library Journal, and Midwest Book Review.
