= Katherine Collins =

Canadian cartoonist

- Born: 6 July 1947 (age 79) Vancouver, British Columbia
- Areas: Cartoonist, Writer
- Notable works: Neil the Horse

Katherine Shannon Collins (born 6 July 1947) is a Canadian-born cartoonist and writer. She created the newspaper comic strip Neil the Horse, which ran from 1975 to 1991.

== Biography ==
Katherine Collins (formerly Arnold Alexander Saba, Jr.) was born in Vancouver, British Columbia, on July 6, 1947. Her name comes from her maternal great-grandmother, Mary Adda "Dolly" Collins, a painter, writer, and illustrator herself. Collins's mother, who was also a cartoonist and comics collector, instilled in her an interest in comics from a young age. Her earliest influences include Carl Barks and Milton Caniff, whose comics she collected throughout the 1950s and onward. She started reading underground comics in the late 1960s, enjoying artists such as Robert Crumb, Kim Deitch, Skip Williamson, Jay Lynch, and Trina Robbins. Growing up in Canada, she was surrounded by and presented with works of both American and British comics culture.

== Career ==
=== Neil the Horse ===
Collins is known as the creator of Neil the Horse. The series ran in Canadian newspapers from 1975-1982 via the Great Lakes Publishing syndicate located in Toronto. It subsequently appeared in fifteen comic book issues from 1983–1988, published by Aardvark-Vanaheim/Renegade Press.

Collins's efforts to continue the project in print were unsuccessful. It was optioned for film and television in cooperation with Zorro Productions, but the work did not make it to the screen.

Referring to Neil the Horse, Maaheen Ahmed wrote that Collins's work is "Rooted in the North American independent comics scene," bringing to life "forgotten elements of comics memories (girls' comics, childish funny animals) that are, in many ways, antithetical to the "grown up" image of comics that was being cultivated contemporaneously". In response to assertions that Neil the Horse appears to be heavily rooted in nostalgia, Collins herself has noted that it never occurred to her that these comics were looking back at all, but were rather an alternative approach to real life.

=== Later career ===
In the past few years, Collins's work has experienced a notable resurgence in popularity and recognition. In 2017, Conundrum Press republished her work in an anthology titled The Collected Neil the Horse, which features all fifteen issues of the Neil the Horse comic book, along with the weekly comic strips and other significant pieces from her career.

=== Awards ===
In 1983, Collins was awarded an Inkpot Award, among the ranks of other acclaimed comics artists such as Robert Crumb (1989), Howard Cruse (1989), Neil Gaiman (1991), and Art Spiegelman (1987).

In 2013, Collins was inducted into the Joe Shuster Award Canadian Comic Book Creator Hall of Fame, and sent an acceptance video to the ceremony. In 2017, Collins was inducted into the "Giants of the North" hall of fame by the Doug Wright Awards for Canadian Cartooning.

== Personal life ==
Katherine Collins was born in Vancouver, British Columbia. She transitioned, identifying publicly as a transgender woman since 1993.

It has been mentioned that Collins wrote a book on her physical and spiritual journey in transitioning to a woman, though it is likely that work was never published.

In 2003, Collins was arrested for her activities as a "highly organized purveyor of psychedelic drugs". Police raided her apartment, finding "six half-pound bags of magic mushrooms" and "four pounds of marijuana". Her conviction, for a crime considered a crime of "moral turpitude", led to her deportation in 2005 under the Patriot Act. After her return to Vancouver, Collins was diagnosed with leukemia. In 2008, she announced she was recovering.
