= Cable (comic book) =

Marvel comic book series

- Cover for Cable #1 (May 1993). Artwork by Art Thibert

Publication information
- Publisher: Marvel Comics
- Format: Ongoing series
- Genre: Superhero
- Publication date: List: (vol. 1) May 1993 – September 2002 (vol. 2) May 2008 – June 2010
- No. of issues: List: (vol. 1): 108 (vol. 2): 25 (vol. 3): 14 (vol. 4): 12 (vol. 5): 4
- Main character(s): Cable; Hope Summers

Creative team
- Written by: List: (vol. 1) Fabian Nicieza Jeph Loeb Todd DeZago James Robinson Joe Casey Joe Pruett Robert Weinberg David Tischman (vol. 2) Duane Swierczynski (vol. 3) [[]] (vol. 4) Gerry Duggan (vol. 5) Fabian Nicieza
- Penciller: List: (vol. 1) Art Thibert Steve Skroce Ian Churchill Jose Ladronn Michael Ryan Igor Kordey (vol. 2) Ariel Olivetti Paul Gulacy Gabriel Guzman
- Inker: List: (vol. 1) Mike Sellers Scott Hanna Juan Vlasco (vol. 2) Mariano Taibo

Cable is the name of multiple comic book titles featuring the character Cable and published by Marvel Comics, beginning with the original Cable comic book series which debuted in 1993.

== Publication history ==
In 1992, the character was featured in his first solo series, a two issue miniseries, titled Cable: Blood and Metal, written by Fabian Nicieza, pencilled by John Romita, Jr., and inked by Dan Green, published in October and November of that year.

=== Volume 1 ===
Shortly after Blood and Metal, Cable was given his own ongoing series titled Cable. The book initially had trouble finding a stable creative team. A writer/penciller team would complete no more than three issues in a row until Jeph Loeb and Ian Churchill began work on issue #20 and finish on #35 (though with a gap between issues #20 and #21 due to the Age of Apocalypse event). Loeb and Churchill provided the first instance of stability, working together on 15 of the 20 issues from #20–39. During their run, they explored characters in Cable's past, his feeling of responsibility toward Nathan Grey, his relationship with Domino and Blaquesmith, and further adventures with Garrison Kane, the Sugar Man, and the Microverse.

Cable #34–35 were part of the "Onslaught" storyline, which was a top vote getter for the Comics Buyer's Guide Fan Award for Favorite Comic-Book Story for 1997.

The series ran for 107 issues from May 1993 until September 2002 before being relaunched as Soldier X, which lasted 12 more issues until Aug. 2003.

After his solo series ended, he was paired with the mercenary Deadpool in a new ongoing series titled Cable & Deadpool.

=== Volume 2 ===
Cover of Cable, vol. 2, 1 (May 2008). Art by Ariel Olivetti

In 2008, Marvel Comics released Cable vol. 2, a new ongoing series by Duane Swierczynski and artist Ariel Olivetti. This new series directly follows the events of "Messiah Complex". The series features Cable, and the messianic child's time traveling adventures. The dangers of the future and pursuit by Bishop are balanced with the humor of "Cable the soldier" becoming "Cable the Nanny."

According to Duane Swierczynski, although the writer "missed Cable's heyday in the early 1990s," Cable is "[his] kind of antihero—the cryptic, Man with No Name of mutantkind. If [Swierczynski had] quibbles with the Cable of yesteryear, it's that he was just a tad too powerful. [Cable] could port around the world at will, fetch beer from the fridge with the power of his mind, and then crush said beer can against his metallic love handle." When asked whether Nathan Summers was a tragic character in his mind, Swierczynski replied that, "Cable's still a bad ass soldier, make no mistake. But [the mission to protect Hope Summers in X-Men: Messiah War] is breaking him down like he's never been broken down before" and said that "[the readers are] going to see Cable struggling with a new bodily problem, one directly borne out of his experiences in 'Messiah War.'"

In 2009, Cable vol. 2 had a seven-issue crossover with X-Force, X-Force/Cable: Messiah War, which is the second story in a three-part storyline that began in X-Men: Messiah Complex.

Cable was canceled in April 2010 with issue #25 (the final issue being called Deadpool and Cable #25).

=== Volume 3 ===
A third volume of Cable, written by James Robinson and drawn by Carlos Pacheco, was launched in April 2017 as part of the ResurrXion relaunch. The series ran for five issues before it was renumbered under legacy issue numbering as part of Marvel's Legacy relaunch, starting with #150. Under this legacy numbering, the title was written by Ed Brisson (#150-154) and Zac Thompson and Lonnie Nadler (#155-159), and drawn by Jon Malin (#150-154) and German Peralta (#155-159).

=== Volume 4 ===
Cable

Publication information
- Publisher: Marvel Comics
- Schedule: Monthly
- No. of issues: 7 (as of January 20, 2020)
- Main character: Cable

Creative team
- Written by: Gerry Duggan
- Artist(s): Phil Noto; Main covers Phil Noto
- Inker: Phil Noto
- Letterer: Joe Sabino
- Colorist: Phil Noto
- Editor(s): Editor; Jordan D. White; Assistant Editor; Annalise Bissa; Head of X Jonathan Hickman

Cable was relaunched in March 2020 as part of Dawn of X. Written by Gerry Duggan and drawn by Phil Noto, the series focuses on the younger version of Cable who is at the center of Krakoa's teenage revolution. The fourth volume concluded after a brief run of 12 issues.

==== Cast ====
Issues	Year	Characters
#1	2020	Armor; Cable; Curse; Fauna; Pixie; Wolverine
#2	2020	Cable; Cyclops; Emma Frost; Stepford Cuckoos
#3	2020	Cable; Deadpool; Esme Cuckoo
#4	2020	Cable; Cyclops; Esme Cuckoo; Emma Frost; Jean Grey
#5	2020	Cable; Cyclops; Jean Grey; Magik
#6	2020	X of Swords crossover
#7	2021	Cable; Cyclops; Jean Grey; Rachel Summers

==== Prints ====
Issue	Publication date	Writer	Artist	Colorist	Comic Book Roundup rating	Estimated sales to North American retailers (first month)	Notes
#1	March 11, 2020	Gerry Duggan	Phil Noto		8.1 by 16 professional critics	52,143	None
#2	July 29, 2020	Gerry Duggan	Phil Noto		8.1 by 8 professional critics	Data not available	None
#3	August 19, 2020	Gerry Duggan	Phil Noto		8.4 by 6 professional critics	Data not available	None
#4	September 2, 2020	Gerry Duggan	Phil Noto		7.5 by 5 professional critics	Data not available	None
#5	October 14, 2020	Gerry Duggan	Phil Noto		8.1 by 8 professional critics	32,500–36,000	X of Swords tie-in
#6	November 18, 2020	Gerry Duggan	Phil Noto		8.0 by 9 professional critics	Data not yet available	X of Swords tie-in
#7	January 20, 2021	Gerry Duggan	Phil Noto		8.5 by 7 professional critics	Data not yet available	None

=== Volume 5 ===
The fifth volume was launched in January 2024 as part of the Fall of X relaunch, taking place at the end of the Krakoan Era. The story finds Cable teaming up with his younger self, to survive a war against Neocracy and Orchis. Being written by longtime X-men writer Fabian Nicieza and drawn by Scot Eaton, the volume concluded after 4 issues.

== Collected editions ==
=== Volume 1 (1993) ===
Title	Material collected	Publication Date	ISBN
Cable Classic: Volume 1	New Mutants (vol. 1) #87; Cable: Blood and Metal; Cable (vol. 1) #1–4	March 2008	Paperback: 0-7851-3123-X
Cable Classic: Volume 2	Cable (vol. 1) #5–14	August 2009	Paperback: 0-7851-3744-0
Cable Classic: Volume 3	Cable (vol. 1) #15–20, Wolverine (vol. 2) #85	August 2012	Paperback: 0-7851-5972-X
Cable and X-Force Classic: Volume 1	Cable (vol. 1) #21–28; X-Force (vol. 1) #44–48	May 2013	Paperback: 978-0-7851-8432-4
Cable and X-Force: Onslaught Rising	Cable (vol. 1) #29-31; X-Force (vol. 1) #49-56, X-Man #14 and X-Force/Cable Annual '95	February 2018	Paperback: 978-1-302-90949-9
Cable and X-Force: Onslaught! (TPB)	Cable (Vol. 1) #32-39; X-Force (Vol. 1) #57-61; Incredible Hulk (Vol. 1) #444; X-Man #18-19; X-Force/Cable Annual '96	March 2019	978-1302916190
X-Man: The Man Who Fell to Earth	Cable (1993) #29–31; Excalibur (1988) #95 and X-Man #5–14	July 4, 2012	Paperback: 978-0-7851-5981-0
X-Men: Prelude to Onslaught	Cable (vol. 1) #32–33; X-Men (vol. 2) #50; Uncanny X-Men (vol. 1) #333; X-Man #15–17,	April 2010	Paperback: 0-7851-4463-3
X-Men: The Complete Onslaught Epic Volume 1	Cable (vol. 1) #34; X-Force (vol. 1) #57; X-Men (vol. 2) #53–54; Uncanny X-Men (vol. 1) #334–335; and more.	December 2007	Paperback: 0-7851-2823-9
X-Men: The Complete Onslaught Epic Volume 2	Cable (vol. 1) #35; X-Force (vol. 1) #58; X-Men (vol. 2) #55, Uncanny X-Men (vol. 1) #336; and more.	June 2008	Paperback: 0-7851-2824-7
X-Men: The Complete Onslaught Epic Volume 4	Cable (vol. 1) #36; X-Men (vol. 2) #56–57; Uncanny X-Men (vol. 2) #337; Onslaught: Epilogue and more.	January 2009	Paperback: 0-7851-2826-3
X-Men: Operation Zero Tolerance	Cable (vol. 1) #45–47; X-Force (vol. 1) #67–70; X-Men (vol. 2) #65–70; and more.	March 2000	Paperback: 978-0-7851-0738-5
Cable: The Hellfire Hunt	Cable (vol. 1) #-1, 48–58; Cable & Machine Man Annual 1998; Machine Man & Bastion Annual 1998; Wolverine/Cable #1	November 2017	Paperback: 978-1-302-90785-3
Deathlok: Rage Against The Machine	Cable (vol. 1) #58–62; Uncanny X-Men (vol. 1) #371; X-Men (vol. 2) #91; X-Men Annual 99'; Deathlok (vol. 3) #1-11.	February 2015	Paperback: 978-0-7851-9291-6
Cable: the Nemesis Contract	Cable (vol. 1) #59-70 and Cable (vol. 1) ANNUAL '99 and X-Man #45-47	January 2018	Paperback: 978-1-302-90948-2
X-Men Vs. Apocalypse, Volume 1: The Twelve	Cable (vol. 1) #75–76; Uncanny X-Men (vol. 1) #376–377; X-Men (vol. 2) #96–97; Wolverine (vol. 2) #146–147	March 2008	Paperback: 0-7851-2263-X
X-Men Vs. Apocalypse, Volume 2: Ages of Apocalypse	Cable (vol. 1) #77; Uncanny X-Men (vol. 1) #378; X-Men (vol. 2) #98; The Search for Cyclops #1–4; and more.	September 2008	Paperback: 0-7851-2264-8
X-Men: Powerless	Cable (vol. 1) #78; X-Force (vol. 1) #101; Uncanny X-Men (vol. 1) #379–380; X-Men (vol. 2) #99; and more.	August 2010	Paperback: 0-7851-4677-6
Cable: Revolution	Cable (vol. 1) #79-96	April 2018	Paperback: 978-1-302-91217-8
X-Men: Dream's End	Cable (vol. 1) #87; Uncanny X-Men (vol. 1) #388–390; Bishop: The Last X-Man #16; X-Men (vol. 2) #108–110.	December 2004	Paperback: 0-7851-1551-X
Cable: Shining Path	Cable (vol. 1) #97–100	May 2002	Paperback: 0-7851-0909-9
Cable: The End	Cable (vol. 1) #101–107	November 2002	Paperback: 0-7851-0963-3
Cable: Soldier X	Cable (vol. 1) #97-107, Soldier X #1-12	October 2018	Hardcover: 978-1-302-91398-4

=== Oversized hardcovers ===
Title	Material collected	Publication Date	ISBN
X-Force Omnibus – Vol. 1	New Mutants #98–100, Annual #7; X-Men Annual #15; X-Factor Annual #6; X-Force #1–15; Spider-Man #16; Cable: Blood & Metal #1–2; material from New Warriors Annual #1, X-Force Annual #1	February 2013	0-7851-6595-9
X-Men: X-Cutioner's Song	X-Force #16–18; Uncanny X-Men #294–296; X-Factor #84–86; and X-Men (vol. 2) #14–16	May 1994	0-7851-0025-3
Deadpool and X-Force Omnibus	X-Force #19-31, Annual #2; Cable (vol. 1) #1–8; Deadpool: The Circle Chase #1-4; Deadpool (vol. 1) #1-4; New Warriors (vol. 1) #31; Nomad #20	November 2017	978-1-302-90830-0
Cable and X-Force Omnibus	X-Force #32-43, Annual #3; Cable #9-20; New Warriors #45-46; X-Factor #106; Excalibur #82, Wolverine #85	July 2019	
X-Men/Avengers: Onslaught	Cable #32-36; X-Force #55, 57-58; Uncanny X-Men #333-337; X-Man #15-19; X-Men #53-57; X-Men Annual '96; X-Men Unlimited #11; Onslaught: X-Men; Onslaught: Marvel Universe; Onslaught: Epilogue; Avengers #401-402; Fantastic Four #415; Incredible Hulk #444-445; Wolverine #104-105; X-Factor #125-126; Amazing Spider-Man #415; Green Goblin #12; Spider-Man #72; Iron Man #332; Punisher #11; Thor #502; X-Men: Road to Onslaught #1; material from Excalibur #100, Fantastic Four #416	March 2022	
X-Men: Operation Zero Tolerance	X-Force #67–70, Generation X #26–31, X-Men #65–70, Uncanny X-Men #346, Wolverine #115–118, Cable #45–47, X-Man #30	August 2012	0-7851-6240-2
X-Men vs. Apocalypse: The Twelve Omnibus	Uncanny X-Men #371-380 and Annual '99; X-Men (vol. 2) #91-99 and Annual '99 (#94, A-story only); X-Men Unlimited #24-26 (#24, A-story only); Astonishing X-Men (vol. 2) #1-3; Wolverine (vol. 2) #145–149; Gambit #8-9; Cable #71-78; X-Man #59-60; X-51 #8; X-Force #101; X-Men Yearbook 1999	February 2020	
Cable: Soldier X	Cable (vol. 1) #97-107, Soldier X #1-12	October 2018	Hardcover: 978-1-302-91398-4

=== Volume 2 (2008) ===
Title	Material collected	Publication Date	ISBN
Cable: The Last Hope, Volume 1	Cable (vol. 2) #1–12; King-Sized Cable; X-Men: The Life and Times of Lucas Bishop #1-3; X-Men: Future History - The Messiah War Sourcebook	April 2018	1-302-91216-X (softcover)
Cable: The Last Hope, Volume 2	Cable (vol. 2) #13-24; Deadpool & Cable #25; X-Force/Cable: Messiah War #1; X-Force (vol.3) #14-16; X-Men: Hope #1	December 2018	1-302-91394-8 (softcover)
Cable, Volume 1: Messiah War	Cable (vol. 2) #1–5	January 2009	0-7851-3226-0 (hardcover); 0-7851-2973-1 (softcover)
Cable, Volume 2: Waiting for the End of the World	Cable (vol. 2) #6–10; King-Sized Cable	June 2009	0-7851-3391-7 (hardcover); 0-7851-2973-1 (softcover)
X-Force/Cable: Messiah War	Cable (vol. 2) #11–15; Messiah War one-shot; X-Force (vol. 3) #14–16; X-Men: The Times and Life of Lucas Bishop #1–3; X-Men: Future History – The Messiah War Sourcebook	August 2009	0-7851-3157-4 (hardcover); 0-7851-3173-6 (softcover)
Cable, Volume 3: Stranded	Cable (vol. 2) #16–20	February 2010	0-7851-4241-X (hardcover); 0-7851-4167-7 (softcover)
Cable, Volume 4: Homecoming	Cable (vol. 2) #21–25; X-Men: Hope #1	November 2010	978-0-7851-4509-7 (hardcover); 978-0-7851-4168-6 (softcover)
Avengers: X-Sanction	Avengers: X-Sanction #1–4	December 2012	Paperback: 0-7851-5863-4

=== Volume 3 (2017) ===
Title	Material collected	Publication Date	ISBN
Cable, Volume 1: Conquest	Cable (vol. 3) #1–5	December 18, 2017	Paperback: 978-1-302-90482-1
Cable, Volume 2: The Newer Mutants	Cable #150–154	April 24, 2018	Paperback: 978-1-302-90483-8
Cable, Volume 3: Past Fears	Cable #155–159	September 19, 2018	Paperback: 978-1-302-91196-6

=== Volume 4 (2020) ===
Title	Material collected	Format	Publication date	ISBN
Cable by Gerry Duggan – Vol. 1	Cable (vol. 4) #1–4	Trade paperback	November 24, 2020	ISBN 978-1-302-92178-1
Cable by Gerry Duggan – Vol. 2	Cable (vol. 4) #7–12	Trade paperback	October 12, 2021	ISBN 978-1-302-92179-8
Cable by Gerry Duggan (Hardcover)	Cable (vol. 4) #1-4, 7-12	Oversized Hardcover	April 2022	
