= The Atheist (comics) =

- Cover of the first issue

Publication information
- Publisher: Image Comics
- Format: Comic book
- Publication date: 2005–present
- Main character(s): Antoine Sharpe, Melissa Nguyen

Creative team
- Created by: Phil Hester (writer), John McCrea (artist)

The Atheist is a horror comic book originally released in April 2005 and is published by Image Comics. Phil Hester, of The Wretch and Green Arrow, wrote The Atheist, while Irish John McCrea of Hitman provided the black and white artwork.

The storyline revolves around present day humans that are having their bodies being "possessed" by the souls from Hell similar to the possessions in the 1950s horror movie The Invasion of the Body Snatchers. The souls from Hell then begin an extremely hedonistic and malicious lifestyle that includes raves, drugs, self-mutilation, murder, and other violence. The possessed bodies then start congregating in Winnipeg, Manitoba, Canada.

== Characters ==
- Antoine Sharpe - The protagonist, who has the nickname The Atheist not for a lack of religious belief, but because Sharpe has an "uncompromising brand of logic". Sharpe is "independently contracted" by the United States government to evaluate the bizarre events caused by the souls from Hell possessing living human bodies.
- Melissa Nguyen - The other protagonist of the comic. She is an employee of The Canadian Security Intelligence Service (CSIS). Sharpe and Nguyen team together to stop the souls from Hell.
