= Open Season (comics) =

Open Season is a comic book series created by Jim Bricker. Six issues were published by Renegade Press and one issue by Strawberry Jam Comics from 1986 to 1989.

Open Season concerned the lives of three roommates living in the San Francisco Bay Area:

- Joe is a just-out-of-college man aspiring to work in the advertising agency.
- Robin is a newspaper reporter.
- Cliff is a former fraternity bigwig who works as an assistant hotel manager.

The three roommates live very different lifestyles and don't particularly like each other, hence the title of the series.

Published in black-and-white, Bricker's style was more akin to those of comic strips than mainstream American superhero comics. The series was generally played for humor, but it core were its well-defined characters, whose problems often resulted in moments of profound pathos.

A stage play based on the series was produced in 1989.
