= Letterer =

Member of a team of comic book creators responsible for drawing the comic book's text

A letterer is a member of a team of comic book creators responsible for drawing the comic book's text. The letterer's use of typefaces, calligraphy, letter size, and layout all contribute to the impact of the comic-book-reading experience. The letterer crafts the comic's "display lettering": the story's title lettering, creator credits, and any specialized captions that appear on the story's first page. They also craft the lettering that appears in the word balloons, also designing the various sound effects that appear within the comic book story. Many letterers also design logos for the comic book company's various titles.

== History ==
=== Origins ===
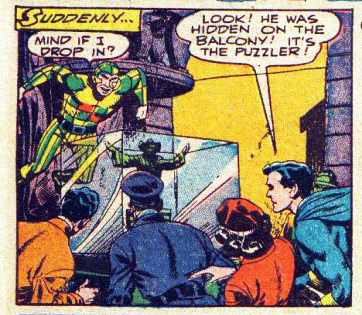
Lettered 1949 panel from America's Best Comics

By the time comic books came of age in the 1940s, the huge volume of work demanded by publishers had encouraged an assembly-line process, dividing the creative process into distinct tasks: writer, penciller, letterer, inker, and colorist. By the late 1940s, it became possible to make a living just lettering comic strips and comic books for artists, studios, and companies that did not have the time or desire to do it in-house. The career of freelance letterer was born, and by the 1950s, letterers such as Gaspar Saladino, Sam Rosen, and Ben Oda were crafting full-time careers as letterers for DC Comics, Marvel Comics, and King Features.

Letterer and logo designer Ira Schnapp defined the DC Comics look for nearly thirty years. Starting in 1940, he designed or refined such iconic logos as Action Comics, Superman, The Flash, and Justice League of America, while also creating the distinctive appearance of DC's house ads and promotions. (Schnapp also designed the Comics Code Authority seal, which was a fixture on comic book covers from all major companies for over forty years.)

DC Comics used a stable of more than 20 letterers in the comics they published in the 1950s and 1960s (some of the letterers — like Jerry Robinson and Dick Sprang — were more well known as artists):

- John Costanza
- Jon D'Agostino
- Ben Oda
- Jerry Robinson
- Joe Rosen
- George Roussos
- Gaspar Saladino
- Ira Schnapp
- Dick Sprang

Starting in around 1966, Ira Schnapp's classic, art deco-inspired look was replaced by the pulsing, organic style of Gaspar Saladino, who redesigned DC's house style for the counterculture era. Gaspar became the cover letterer for all of DC's books throughout the 1970s, and even "ghosted" as Marvel Comics' "page-one" letterer for much of the same period. Gaspar's work became so iconic that various independent comics publishers which sprang up in the 1970s and 1980s – such as Atlas/Seaboard, Continuity Comics, and Eclipse Comics – hired him to design logos for their entire line of titles.

From 1930 through the 1990s (with a few exceptions), the letterer added their lettering, in pen and ink, on the same original art page the penciler drew. The penciled art was then inked after the letterer had completed their work on the page. At DC Comics during the "Silver Age" of the 1960s, pencilers were required to "rough in balloons and sound effects" for the letterers to use as a working guide. An accomplished letterer was able to adapt their style to the style of the art for that particular book.

=== Computer lettering ===
The evolution of desktop publishing powered by computers, especially those made by Apple, began in the 1980s, and started having a gradual impact on comics lettering soon after. One of the first users of computer-generated lettering was writer/artist John Byrne, who made fonts from existing lettering. (Incidentally, Byrne made use of existing lettering by other artists, such as Dave Gibbons, without their permission. Now Byrne uses a computer font based on the handwriting of letterer Jack Morelli – with Morelli's permission.) Other early users of computer lettering were David Cody Weiss and Roxanne Starr, who experimented in computer lettering with Bob Burden's Flaming Carrot Comics.

Computer lettering really started making an impact with the availability of the first commercial comic book font, "Whizbang" (created by Studio Daedalus) around 1990.

In the early 1990s letterer Richard Starkings and his partner John Roshell (formerly Gaushell) began digitally creating comic book fonts for use on computers, and started Comicraft, which has since become the major source of comics fonts (though they have competition from others, such as Blambot).

In deference to tradition, at first computer lettering was printed out and pasted onto the original artwork, but after a few years, as comics coloring also moved to desktop publishing, digital lettering files began to be used more effectively by combining them directly with digital art files, eliminating the physical paste-up stage altogether. Wildstorm Comics was ahead of the curve, Marvel came around a few years later, and DC held to traditional production methods the longest, but now nearly all lettering is digitally applied.

In the early years of the 21st Century, the mainstream American comics companies moved almost exclusively to in-house computer lettering, effectively ending the era of the freelance letterer. Chris Eliopoulos designed the fonts for Marvel's in-house lettering unit, and Ken Lopez did the same at DC. Since then the trend has swung the other way, with most comics publishers once again using freelance letterers rather than in-house staff. Nearly all use computer and digital comic book fonts.

== Tools and methods ==
=== On-the-board ===
The traditional comic book letterer needs little more than a lettering guide, a pen or brush, India ink, and white paint for corrections. Some situations required the letterer to use vellum overlays on top of the original art.

=== EC Comics ===
The lettering in the comics of the sensationalist horror comics publisher EC Comics (c. 1945 – c. 1955) was different from other publishers – its mechanical appearance gave it a sterile aspect, and helped define the particular style of comics EC was known for. EC's letterers achieved their particular look by using a Leroy lettering set, a device popular amongst draftsmen and architects. The Leroy lettering set consisted of a stylus and a pantographic lettering form.

=== Computer lettering ===
Most Marvel and DC books are now lettered using a graphics program such as Adobe Illustrator, Adobe Photoshop or Adobe InDesign, and a font that resembles hand lettering. Computer lettering provides a lot of technical shortcuts, especially by combining the lettering work directly with digital art files, eliminating the tedious physical paste-up stage altogether. Some letterers handwrite part of the script. Hand-lettering is often used for sound effects and onomatopoeia in comics.

There are also still comics artists and inkers who prefer to have the lettering directly on their pages. First, it saves drawing time (not having to put art where a big caption will be); and second, comics tell a story, and a page of comics art without the lettering is only half the story.

Long-time letterer John Workman toes a middle ground between traditional and digital lettering. In addition to his "on-the-art boards work", Workman has been electronically hand-lettering by way of a Wacom tablet.

== Awards and recognition ==
The Shazam Awards, given from 1970 to 1975, had a "best letterer" category. Both the Harvey Awards (given starting in 1992) and the Eisner Awards (given starting in 1993) have a "best letterer" category. Todd Klein has won the Eisner award for lettering fifteen times and has won the Harvey Award for lettering eight times. Ken Bruzenak, Chris Ware, John Workman, and Dan Clowes have all won the Harvey Award for lettering multiple times.

== Letterers and lettering studios ==
=== Notable letterers ===
- Diana Albers
- Jim Aparo
- Ken Bruzenak
- Janice Chiang
- John Costanza
- Chris Eliopoulos
- Tom Frame
- Todd Klein
- Ken Lopez
- Jack Morelli
- Jim Novak
- Bill Oakley
- Ben Oda
- Tom Orzechowski
- Annie Parkhouse
- Bill Pearson
- Nate Piekos
- Joe Rosen
- Sam Rosen
- Gaspar Saladino
- Ira Schnapp
- Artie Simek
- Richard Starkings
- John Workman
- Bill Yoshida

=== Artist-letterers ===
Cartoonists known for the lettering on their own comics:

- Jim Aparo
- John Byrne
- Eddie Campbell
- Daniel Clowes
- Dave Gibbons
- Jean (Moebius) Giraud
- Rian Hughes
- Walt Kelly
- Frank Miller
- Stan Sakai
- Dave Sim
- Ty Templeton
- Frank Thorne
- Noah Van Sciver
- Chris Ware

=== Companies ===
Companies and studios that create fonts and provide computer lettering:

- Blambot
- Comicraft
