= Renegade Press =

Defunct American comic book company

- Industry: Comics
- Founded: 1984
- Founder: Deni Loubert
- Defunct: 1989
- Headquarters: Long Beach, California, U.S.

Renegade Press was an American comic book company, founded by Canadian Deni Loubert, that operated from 1984 to 1988. Notable titles published by Renegade included Flaming Carrot, Ms. Tree, and normalman.

== History ==
Loubert was publisher of Aardvark-Vanaheim until she and husband Dave Sim (owner and major contributor to Aardvark-Vanaheim) divorced, at which point she started Renegade and moved to the United States. With the move, all of Aardvark-Vanaheim's titles (with the exception of Cerebus) left that publisher to continue with Renegade. These included Flaming Carrot Comics, normalman, Neil the Horse, and Ms. Tree.

Although Renegade started in high-profile fashion, its titles suffered from low print runs. In early 1988, Renegade refit its publishing strategy, but suspended all publications later that year. In July 1989 the publisher was shut down for good.

== Titles ==
- 3-D Zone Pack Vol. 2 (#6–10)
- 3-D Zone Set
- Agent Unknown (1987–1988), #1–3
- Amusing Stories
- Howard Cruse's Barefootz: The Comix Book Stories (1986), #1
- Cases of Sherlock Holmes (1986–1989), #1–15 (moved to Northstar Publications)
- Cecil Kunkle Vol. 1 (1986), #1
- Ditko's World Featuring...Static (1986), #1–3 (considered Robin Snyder's Revolver #7–9 as per the title page of #3)
- Eternity Smith (1986–1987), #1–5 (moved to Hero Comics)
- Flaming Carrot (1985), #6–17 (moved to Dark Horse Comics)
- French Ice Featuring Carmen Cru (1987–1988), #1–13
- Friends (1987), #1–3
- Gene Day's Black Zeppelin (1985–1986), #1-5
- Holiday Out (1987), #1–3
- Kafka
- Kilgore #1-4
- Love Fantasy
- Manimal (1986), #1
- Maxwell Mouse Follies (1986), #1–6
- Mechthings (1987–1988), #1–3
- Ms. Tree (1985–1989), #16–50 (from Aardvark-Vanaheim, #16–18 published with Aardvark-Vanaheim)
- Ms. Tree 3-D (1985), #1
- Ms. Tree Rock & Roll Summer Special (1986), #1
- Murder (1986), #1–3 (considered Robin Snyder's Revolver #10–12 as per the title pages of #11 and #12)
- Neil the Horse (1984–1988), #11–15 (from Aardvark-Vanaheim)
- normalman (1985), #9–12, 3-D Annual #1 (from Aardvark-Vanaheim)
- Open Season (moved to Strawberry Jam Comics)
- Phony Pages (1986), #1–2
- Renegade Romance
- Robyn Snyder's Revolver (1985–1986), #1–6
- Robot Comics (1987), #0
- Roscoe the Dawg, Ace Detective
- Shadows from the Grave
- The Silent Invasion (1986–1987), #1–10 (moved to Caliber Comics)
- The Spiral Cage (1986), non-numbered
- Starbikers
- Starbinders
- Strata (1986), #1–5
- Suburban Nightmares (1988), #1–4
- T-Minus-1 (1988), #1
- Tony Bravado: Trouble-Shooter (1988), #1–2
- Trypto the Acid Dog (1988), #1
- Valentino
- Vicki Valentine (1985), #1
- Wimmen's Comix (1986–1987), #11–13 (from Last Gasp; continued at Rip Off Press)
- Wordsmith (1985–1988), #1–12 (reprinted by Caliber Comics)
