= Flaming Carrot Comics =

American superhero comic

The Flaming Carrot
- The Flaming Carrot, from Flaming Carrot #4 (Image Comics, 2006); art by Bob Burden.

Publication information
- Publisher: Aardvark-Vanaheim (1984–1985); Renegade Press (1985–1987); Dark Horse Comics (1988–2002); Image Comics (2004–2006)
- First appearance: Visions #1 (Atlanta Fantasy Fair, 1979)
- Created by: Bob Burden

In-story information
- Species: Human
- Abilities: Ability to induce himself in a state of "Zen Stupidity"; Use of nuclear powered pogo stick and a semi-automatic pistol Wears a utility belt
Flaming Carrot Comics
Publication information
- Schedule: Irregular
- Format: Ongoing series
- Genre: Independent
- Publication date: May 1984 – Mar. 2006
- No. of issues: 37
- Main character: Flaming Carrot
Creative team
- Written by: Bob Burden
- Artist: Bob Burden

Flaming Carrot Comics is an American superhero comic book created by Bob Burden, featuring the absurd, surreal adventures of the Flaming Carrot.

The series first appeared in Visions #1, a magazine-size comic book publication. Flaming Carrot chronicled "the further adventures of the strangest man alive". Flaming Carrot is often noted for his distinctive exclamation "Ut!" Flaming Carrot adventures have been published by Aardvark-Vanaheim, Renegade Press, Dark Horse Comics, and Image Comics, among others. He has guest-starred and made cameos in comics published by Fantagraphics, Mirage Studios, Atomeka Press, and others.

== Concept and themes ==
The Flaming Carrot was in part inspired by the obscure Golden Age character The Fin. Burden recounted "I took this particular idea and scratched it down one night when I came home about three o'clock in the morning. I'd been out on the town all night, and it was one of those nights when I came home tired and fell asleep with my clothes on." When asked to explain the meaning of the character's catchphrase "Ut!", he stated:

I'll tell you who said it. At Shea Stadium, when the Beatles were all up there, and the fans were trying to rush the stage, and the police were trying to keep them behind the barricades, George Harrison points to one that gets through, and says, "Ut!" It's like oops! It's just a goofy thing that's kind of childlike and fun.

Flaming Carrot Comics and Burden's spin-off Mysterymen project went on to forsake the elitist, perfection-oriented traditional superheroes with characters who were blue-collar, second-string, roughnecks and goofballs with mediocre powers: outcasts that couldn't make it into the major leagues but saved people, risked everything and fought evil.

Flaming Carrot and the other Mysterymen are depicted as unconventional and often disorderly characters from working-class American backgrounds. They are shown engaging in irreverent behavior, heavy drinking, legal troubles, and morally ambiguous actions, while occasionally obtaining food, drinks, or romantic encounters.

Burden commented that "our theme was do the best you can with what you got, never leave a pal behind, lost causes are sometimes the best ones and keep it fun. I'd say, Flaming Carrot was to the regular superheroes what Huckleberry Finn was to Tom Sawyer".

== Publication history ==
The Flaming Carrot first appeared in Visions #1 (1979), a direct-market magazine and in subsequent yearly issues that eventually became the program booklet of the Atlanta Fantasy Fair, with Flaming Carrot stories went on to appear in each yearly edition of the magazine through 1987. Bob Burden illustrated and wrote the book, with lettering by Roxanne Starr, who went on to be one of the first pioneers of computer lettering.

In 1981, Burden, under the company name Killian Barracks Press, self-published Flaming Carrot Comics #1, an oversized one-shot. Four to eight-page Flaming Carrot stories appeared in each subsequent annual issue of Visions through #4 (1982), that last of which contained an apocryphal Flaming Carrot history that convinced Dave Sim, of the self-publishing company Aardvark-Vanaheim, to publish Flaming Carrot as a regular comic, First, however, Sim included back-up stories of the Carrot in the pages of Aardvark-Vanaheim's Cerebus' #61–62 (cover-dated April–May 1984). The Carrot eventually guest starred in the series proper in Cerebus #104 (Nov. 1987).

In the meantime, Aardvark-Vanaheim had published Flaming Carrot #1-5 (May 1984 - Jan. 1985). The company also published a 3-D special, A-V In 3-D #1 (Dec. 1984).

After Dave Sim and Deni Loubert, the couple behind Aardvark-Vanaheim, divorced, Loubert established Renegade Press to publish all of Aardvark-Vanaheim's former titles apart from Cerebus. Flaming Carrot was one of these, and remained with Renegade until the publisher went bankrupt in 1988. Renegade published issues #6-17 (March 1985 - July 1987). Burden also published a short Flaming Carrot piece in the Fantagraphics anthology Anything Goes! (Oct. 1986).

After Renegade, Burden took Flaming Carrot to Dark Horse Comics, which published 14 more issues of Flaming Carrot, #18-31 (June 1988 to Oct. 1994). Dark Horse also published Flaming Carrot stories in its anthology Dark Horse Presents #20 (Aug. 1988) and its annual anthology San Diego Comic Con Comics #1.

Following issue #31 in 1994, the character appeared only sporadically in one-shots over the next decade as Burden focused on writing stories for a number of new properties including a new Mysterymen comic series. In winter 1994, Bob Burden self-published Flaming Carrot Stories No. 1, referred to on the cover as a "Text Version of Future Issue". From 1997-1998, the company published four volumes of the Flaming Carrot Comics Collected Album, which was the first time the series had been reprinted, and the 64-page "Flaming Carrot Comics Annual No.1", featuring a new story. In 1999, Dark Horse published four issues of the spin-off series "Bob Burden's Original Mysterymen Comics", which did not feature the Flaming Carrot. In 2002, Dark Horse published the crossover special Flaming Carrot & Reid Fleming, World's Toughest Milkman, listed as Flaming Carrot Comics #32 in the indicia.

In 1993–1994, Mirage Studios published the four-issue series Teenage Mutant Ninja Turtles / Flaming Carrot Crossover. Burden did not do the art for this series, however.

Flaming Carrot was relaunched in 2004 with Image Comics and Desperado Publishing. This series lasted two years, comprising four issues (simultaneously numbered #1-4, and #33-36).

The final appearance of Flaming Carrot was the 2006 Photo Comic Special #1 (#37), featuring "fumetti" style of storytelling using photographs instead of illustration, in conjunction with Sam Gaffin and his Killer Robots project.

== Fictional character biography ==
The Flaming Carrot origin states that "having read 5,000 comics in a single sitting to win a bet, this poor man suffered brain damage and appeared directly thereafter as—the Flaming Carrot!".

Flaming Carrot's villains include the likes of the Artless Dodger, Don Wiskerando, The Bicycle Thief, Garbage Mouth, Mr. Chicken Pants, a giant spider with diapers on, and many others. The Carrot, who lives in Palookaville, a blue-collar district of rust-belt era Iron City, has staved off at least three alien invasions, a Communist takeover of Iron City, flying dead dogs, the Man in the Moon, Death itself, and a cloned horde of evil marching Hitler's boots. Flaming Carrot even died in #6 by falling into a deep toxic waste pit in Palookaville, but was brought back from clinical death in #7, described his sojourn in Limbo in #8 and got back at those who sent him to Limbo in #9.

Flaming Carrot was also a founding member of the blue collar superhero group the Mystery Men, introduced in a flashback/dream sequence in Flaming Carrot Comics #16. The story of this group was later made into the 1999 film Mystery Men and a short-lived spin-off comic book series. The Flaming Carrot himself does not appear in the film, although a handful of characters like Mr. Furious, the Shoveler, and Dr. Heller do. The Blue Raja character serves as the Flaming Carrot's stand-in.

== Powers and abilities ==
The Carrot wears a costume that consists of a giant carrot mask which extends from above his head to below his crotch, a white shirt, red pants, and flippers on his feet (in case he has to swim). The mask has a continually burning flame at the top and a secret compartment containing a nuclear-powered pogo stick (the mask and the pogo stick were invented by Dr. Heller of the Mystery Men). The Flaming Carrot also wears a crime fighting utility belt which is filled with Silly Putty, rubber bands, laughing gas, random playing cards, sneezing powder, and other similarly frivolous items. Dr. Heller upgraded Flaming Carrot's equipment after bringing him back from the clinically dead. The Flaming Carrot also relies heavily on his 9mm Radom pistol to kill his enemies.

The Flaming Carrot is able to go into a self-induced state of "Zen Stupidity" in order to face danger and evil boldly and without trepidation.

== Collected editions ==
Flaming Carrot Comics have been collected in a number of trade paperbacks and hardcovers.

Trade Paperbacks

Flaming Carrot Comics: Man of Mystery! (Collected Album No. 1)

- Collects: #1-3, material published in Cerebus #61-63, Aardvark-Vanaheim in 3-D, and some original material
- Dark Horse Comics, 1997

Flaming Carrot Comics: The Wild Shall Wild Remain! (Collected Album No. 2)

- Collects: #4-11 and some original material
- Dark Horse Comics, 1997

Flaming Carrot's Greatest Hits (Collected Album No. 3)

- Collects: #12-18 and some original material
- Dark Horse Comics, 1998

Flaming Carrot Comics: Fortune Favors the Bold! (Collected Album No. 4)

- Collects: #19-24 and some original material
- Dark Horse Comics, 1998

Mysterymen (Collected Anthology No. 1)

- Collects: #16-17, 25-27 and Annual #1
- Dark Horse Comics, 1999

Flaming Carrot Comics: Unacceptable Behavior (Collected Album No. 6)*

- Collects: #1-4 of the Image series( #33-36 in regular series) and Flaming Carrot Special #1 (2006)
- Image/Desperado Comics, 2006

Flaming Carrot Omnibus (Volume 1)

- Collects: #1-2, 4-11 and 25-27
- Dark Horse Comics, 2019

*Flaming Carrot Comics (Collected Album No. 5) was planned but never released.

Hardcovers

Flaming Carrot Comics (Limited Edition Hardcover #1)

- Collects: the same material as Man of Mystery!, as well as a new 10-page Flaming Carrot story, a foreword by Dave Sim, the first appearance of three new superheroes
- Bob Burden Studios, 2008

Flaming Carrot Comics (Limited Edition Hardcover #2)

- Collects: the same material as The Wild Shall Wild Remain!, as well as an all-new story
- Bob Burden Studios, 2008

Uncollected Issues

The following have yet to be collected, among others:

- Flaming Carrot Comics #28–32
- Teenage Mutant Ninja Turtles Flaming Carrot #1-4 (1993)
- Flaming Carrot Stories #1 (1994)
- Flaming Carrot and Reid Fleming, World's Toughest Milkman (2002)

== Legacy ==
Flaming Carrot’s unpredictable antics, irreverent humor, fantastic characters and surreal storylines engendered a cult following and legendary status that still exists to this day. Burden attributes his longevity and success to the storytelling more than anything else: "The stories seem, at first glance, non-linear and spontaneous, and in truth they start that way, but they are really linear. I always somehow manage to orchestrate a beginning, middle and end. I believe I was born a natural storyteller, but journalism school and the Robert McKee books and writing seminars didn't hurt at all. Studying is not about memorizing or mimicking the methods of others. When trying to mentor young, new artists, my main objective is to teach them to teach themselves, to also learn on their own and experiment, take risks... just use knowledge as a jumping off point for wisdom. And always remember, no matter how hard it seems, it's also got to be fun. Never lose sight of that."

Like the primitive, raw New Wave music of the early 80s spawned from the art-student/garage-band movement, the New Wave comics championed creativity over musical experience and expertise. Flaming Carrot was one of the founding elements of the New Wave in comics, where independent, self-published, outside-the-box, creators wrote books that rebooted, reformatted and revived the comics industry. Burden never went to art school or took lessons, but collected and studied original comic art and took tips and critiques from experienced comic and art mentors like Jim Steranko, Stanislav Szukalski and Steve Ditko.

Working outside of the corporate comics environment and challenging the conservative approach of Marvel and DC, the "Indi Comics" creators of the early 80s set a trend of literary, humorous, and absurdist stories.

The early, pioneering, and seminal New Wave/independent books like Cerebus The Aardvark and Flaming Carrot Comics served as "missing links" to the heritage of the then fading Underground comics. Books like Flaming Carrot carried on the explorations and off-the-wall forays of the preceding undergrounds, and revived the sense of freedom and creativity that the undergrounds had instigated.

Eventually, the comic revolution of the early 80s was absorbed and co-opted by the big companies and the mainstream comics industry, but not before giving inspiration to more commercial properties like Teenage Mutant Ninja Turtles, Spawn and The Crow, all of which crowned and validated the indie comics movement with mass-market success. In Burden's commentary: "Even Flaming Carrot succumbed to the pop comics frenzy with the 60 million-dollar spin-off Mystery Men movie from Universal. But walk down artist alley at any comic convention and there's a whole new generation of go-getters and story-tellers sharpening their pencils with a pocket knife, publishing their own short run books, having fun and ready to take on the world".

== Awards ==
- 1992 Eisner Award nomination: Best Continuing Series
- 1992 Eisner Award nomination: Best Humor Publication
- 2007 Eisner Award: Best Humor Publication
