= Bob Burden =

American comic book artist and writer

- Burden at Dragon Con in 2026
- Born: Robert Burden; 1952 (age 73–74) Buffalo, New York
- Areas: Writer, Penciller
- Notable works: Flaming Carrot Comics; Mystery Men
- Awards: Inkpot Award, 1990; Will Eisner Comics Industry Award, 1988

Bob Burden is an American comic book artist and writer, best known as the creator of Flaming Carrot Comics and the Mystery Men.

== Early life ==
Burden was born the eldest of three siblings in Buffalo, New York. His father worked at Westinghouse Electric Corporation and moved the family often, to cities like Pittsburgh and Milwaukee.

Burden graduated with a degree in journalism from the University of Georgia. After graduation, he worked as a collectible and antique salesman.

== Career ==
Burden's best-known creation is the Flaming Carrot which first appeared in 1979 direct market magazine. He worked as writer and editor with lettering by Roxanne Starr. It has received some scholarly recognition: a cover story and interview in Atlanta's prestigious Art Papers; an original cover drawing in Sotheby's art auction; and reviews in The Village Voice literary supplement.

Burden's Mystery Men was the subject of a 1999 film adaptation, directed by Kinka Usher and starring Ben Stiller and Geoffrey Rush.

Besides Flaming Carrot Comics and Mysterymen, Burden wrote a Gumby story, a two-part Cholly & Flytrap story with Arthur Suydam, and Robot Comics, a series which was reprised as the "Robot Crime" story for the 20th anniversary of Heavy Metal.

Burden has also produced some prose work, including a short story called "You've Got Your Troubles, I've Got Mine", and an anthology of short stories by various writers, including Stephen King, called Dark Love, from Penguin Books.

Though he has drawn a number of comics, Burden has said that he considers himself solely a writer: "I'm a writer, okay? The fact that I draw art is purely coincidental to that, but I'm not really what you'd call a competent illustrator."

== Awards ==
Burden's works have won numerous awards including the Inkpot Award for Outstanding Achievement in Comic Arts, the ACE Award, and perhaps the most prestigious award in comics, the Will Eisner Comics Industry Award for the Best Single Issue (Gumby's Summer Fun Special). Burden also has two 1998 Eisner Award Nominations, for Invincible Man and Flaming Carrot's Greatest Hits Volume Three.
