= Micro-adventure (disambiguation) =

Micro-adventure may refer to:

- Microadventure, an overnight outdoor adventure that is small and achievable
- Micro Adventure, a young adult series of books published by Scholastic, Inc. during the 1980s
- MicroAdventure!, a 4D film spin off of the Honey, I Shrunk the Kids film series that was shown at Tokyo Disneyland
