= M.I.C.R.A.: Mind Controlled Remote Automaton =

American comic book series

M.I.C.R.A.
- Doctor Lucrane and M.I.C.R.A. on the cover of M.I.C.R.A.: Mind Controlled Remote Automaton No. 7, by Ted Boonthanakit.

Character information
- First appearance: M.I.C.R.A.: Mind Controlled Remote Automaton No. 1 (1986)

In-story information
- Alter ego: Angela Griffin (born Angela Morales)
- Species: Human
- Place of origin: Earth
- Abilities: Superhuman strength Superhuman durability Flight; Laser blasts

Publication information
- Publisher: Fictioneer Books
- Schedule: Bi-Monthly (#1–2); Quarterly (#3–7)
- Formats: Limited series
- Genre: Superhero
- Publication date: November 1986–Spring 1988
- Number of issues: 7

Creative team
- Writer(s): Lamar Waldron
- Artist(s): Ted Boonthanakit
- Editor(s): Dwight Jon Zimmerman

M.I.C.R.A.: Mind Controlled Remote Automaton (often referred to as simply MICRA or Micra) is an unfinished creator-owned American science fiction comic book series written by Lamar Waldron and drawn by Ted Boonthanakit. It was published between November 1986 and Spring 1988 by Fictioneer Books, an imprint of Comics Interview publisher David Anthony Kraft. Set in 2048–49, the story concerns a young paraplegic college student who is able to take control of the titular robotic body via telepresence.

== Creation ==
Waldron conceived of the storyline some four years before publication. He had hoped to again partner with Rod Whigham after their well-received collaboration on the graphic novel Lightrunner, but after the artist found work with Marvel Comics Waldron instead planned it as a prose novel. However, he went back to the original plan, intending to work with airbrush artist Tom Gonzales. The pair were unable to find a publisher until WaRP Graphics showed an interest, and then only as a black-and-white series. As Gonzales had no experience in the medium he left the project. Waldron found a new artist via a competition at the Atlanta Fantasy Fair, an event he co-founded, which unearthed the Thailand-born Ted Boonthanakit.

The author aimed to combine aspects of the superhero, science fiction and robot comics in M.I.C.R.A.. Waldron felt telepresence was an achievable near-future technology, and also hoped to address his views on the planet's ecological future, telling Amazing Heroes "The trends are there – all I've done is assume they continue to accelerate at the same rate". He hoped that as well as exploring these concepts the work would still be able to present strong characters.

== Publishing history ==
M.I.C.R.A was planned as a 12-issue limited series. Before any material was published the series encountered problems with WaRP. Waldron pitched it to Comics Interview president David Anthony Kraft, who was looking to expand his portfolio after the success of Southern Knights, and a deal was struck. Kraft showed the M.I.C.R.A. concept writeup to his friend Dwight Jon Zimmerman, asking for his input. Impressed by the several pages of critiques and suggestions which Zimmerman returned to him, Kraft asked Zimmerman to be the editor for M.I.C.R.A. The first issue was released in September 1986 (cover-dated November 1986), and was heavily advertised by Kraft with inserts in Comics Buyer's Guide, which would also run several pieces promoting the series. Kraft would state the tactics led to considerable demand for the first issue. Further support came when M.I.C.R.A was featured on the cover of Kraft's Comics Interview No. 49, which included a lengthy interviews with Waldron, Boonthanakit and series letterer Susan Barrows.

Initially the comic was bi-monthly, but it changed to quarterly from No. 3. Issue No. 7 featured a recap, with advertising flagging it as a good starting point for new readers and linking the story matter with the successful film Robocop. The comic reputedly had a circulation of 30,000, outselling acclaimed titles of the period such as Love and Rockets, "Omaha" the Cat Dancer and Xenozoic Tales, but was a victim of a glut of small publisher black-and-white comics on the market. Feeling Kraft was unable to support the title in the competitive market, Waldron did not renew the contact with Fictioneer following the publication of No. 7.

Waldron looked for another publisher to continue it, possibly as a colour title. Apple Comics were announced as M.I.C.R.A's new publisher in 1988 with issue No. 8, "All Hell Breaks Loose" announced and a trade paperback containing the stories to date also planned for 1989. Apple also planned to continue the series further after the initial 12-issue storyline was completed. However, no further issues were produced before Apple folded in 1994.

== Synopsis ==
In 2048, much of Earth's atmosphere has become polluted, and the United States is controlled by the authoritarian President Corman. The privileged Insiders live in A.S.Ds (Air Supported Domes) where it is pure, while the poor live beyond as Outsiders, many of whom die young from cancer. Spoiled rich girl Angela Griffin, a bioengineering student at King University in the South Dakota A.S.D., is visiting Yellowstone Recreation Dome with her boyfriend Matt. The dome comes under attack by rebel Free America Now forces, and Angela is left comatose and quadriplegic. Her distraught adoptive father dies in a Speeder crash shortly after visiting her. On Christmas Day, Angela regains consciousness. Her bratty attitude irritates the King University Hospital staff, including her nurse Tanya. Over the next couple of months she gradually comes to regret her attitude, and is visited by her classmate Eric Jensen, who arranges for Doctor Aleta Lucane to meet with her. The professor is sympathetic towards Angela's plight and offers the hope of a human application for the M.I.C.R.A. (Mind Controlled Remote Automaton) technology if she resumes her studies. Wanting to avoid the scrutiny of principled Vice President Paula Robinson while exploring the military potential of M.I.C.R.A., Corman and General Wyler underwrite Lucane's research budget, with Colonel Barr assigned as observer. After a few weeks, the M.I.C.R.A. synthetic android is ready, and Angela mentally transfers to the robot.

Angela bonds with Eric and Tanya. M.I.C.R.A. undergoes flight testing, while Angela learns she was adopted. Led by Rita Morales, Free America Now seizes control of the Dallas A.S.D. Government commandos are sent in to reclaim it, with both sides causing collateral damage. Most of Rita's followers are killed but she escapes on a Speeder. Wounded, she crashes and her Speeder's distress signal is picked up by M.I.C.R.A. When Angela sends the robot to investigate it comes under fire. M.I.C.R.A. attacks the rebels, only to be disabled by an electrical blast. Angela reboots M.I.C.R.A. and confronts Rita, discovering she is her biological sister, and they were both born Outsiders. Discovering M.I.C.R.A. has automatic weaponry built in, she disables the Free America Now soldiers, though Rita escapes. M.I.C.R.A. is then sent to the Detroit A.S.D. to meet an army informant; however, the spy has defected to Free America Now and M.I.C.R.A. is trapped. Army reinforcements arrive in time to prevent the destruction of M.I.C.R.A., who is filmed by a news crew. Enraged over the military's interference in the project, Locane declares that M.I.C.R.A. will be shut down.

Angela's attorney locates her birth mother, Maria Morales. Barr persuades Locane to continue the M.I.C.R.A. project, with the compromise that Angela will have manual control of the weapons systems. They use M.I.C.R.A. to visit the San Simeon slum looking for her mother. However, she discovers Maria was killed in a riot shortly after her adoption, with another resident drawing her social security checks. With the help of the resident she learns Rita has been working at the Monterey ASD in an Esctasite, a high-tech brothel. M.I.C.R.A.'s enquiries there are fruitless as Rita is at a Free America Now rally in Lusk, Wyoming, announcing on TV that the whole settlement is being held hostage. With the regular army unable to make any impression on Rita's forces, M.I.C.R.A. is sent to Wyoming, bargaining for better treatment of Eric in return. Rita uses an electrical generator to knock M.I.C.R.A. off-line. Angela reboots the robot and attempts to convince Rita of her identity, but Rita is seemingly killed by army reinforcements. Angela is enraged, especially when the army begins massacring surrendering rebels, shooting down one of the government speeders. Upon M.I.C.R.A.'s return to Kings University, Angela tells Barr she no longer wants to be part of the program. He attempts to talk her out of it, revealing he is secretly aligned with Robinson, who contacts Angela and asks her to continue as M.I.C.R.A. Angela tells Barr of her relation to Rita and her actions in Wyoming, and with the support of Locane and Eric they conspire to use M.I.C.R.A. to covertly curb the military's excesses while Robinson works to end martial law through legitimate political means. The Free America Now survivors, led by Rita's friend Flik, reach the Colorado dome. M.I.C.R.A. is sent in to help. The terrorists are captured, as are numerous councillors loyal to Robinson, as part of Corman's plan to equate her hopes of ending martial law with the terrorist group. The president is eager to mass-produce M.I.C.R.A. for the armed forces. Angela uses M.I.C.R.A. to free the councillors held in Colorado without discovery, and begins a relationship with Eric. Lucane and Barr also grow closer.

Military intelligence learns of Angela's origin as an Outsider, and that she is sister to Rita. In the Washington dome, Wyler and his adjutant Evans realise that Angela and her friends are actually helping the rebels during an action at Cheyenne. Wanting them killed before he is disgraced, Wyler contacts Angela, offering her radical surgery to end her paralysis. The tactile feedback from a feeling body would make her unable to use M.I.C.R.A. Wyler kidnaps Flik and fellow rebel Woryer, planning to use them as stooges for the murders of Locane and Eric, while arranging for the hospital's power supply to go off during Angela's operation. Tanya, a mole for military intelligence, tearfully confesses the plan to Angela. She protests as the operations begins, and the surgeon tells her she has to decide whether she wants the treatment or not. Barr is shot by Wyler after attempting to break free, and the general waits for the powercut that will signify Angela's death.

=== Unpublished material ===
The series went out of publication before the storyline could be resolved, ending on a cliffhanger. Waldron suggested that M.I.C.R.A. No. 8 would see someone else take control of M.I.C.R.A., and that the main cast fight their way out of the dome and winter with the Outsiders in North Dakota. The third arc from #9–12 would have been set several months later. Reputedly Waldron was frequently asked about the resolution of the cliffhanger at conventions in the following years. A text story featuring M.I.C.R.A. originally written for a fanzine by Waldron was printed in issue 12 of Caliber Press' anthology Negative Burn in 1994, and the character was featured on the cover using new art created by Boonthanakit. In an accompanying interview, Waldron was still optimistic about Apple Comics publishing new material for the series. As of 2026 the work remains incomplete.

=== Additional material ===
Timelines of the series' "future history" written by Waldron were printed in M.I.C.R.A. No. 2, No. 4 and No. 6 Boonthanakit also produced a pin-up of M.I.C.R.A. for Amazing Heroes' 1987 Swimsuit issue.

== Reception ==
Don Thompson graded the first issue 'A' in a review for Comic Buyer's Guide, calling it "one heck of a good comic book" and praising Boonthanakit's art. R.A. Jones of Amazing Heroes was also positive, noting it "combined the genres of superheroes and science fiction with overtones of Japanimation to yield a comic that's truly unique", also complementing the art. The cover of the second issue carried praise from Stan Lee and Ray Bradbury, while the collected edition also bore testimonials from Roger Zelazny, Trina Robbins, Will Eisner, Thompson and Robert Bloch.

Joe Pruett would later describe M.I.C.R.A. as the first comic to deal with virtual reality and one of the first with a "realistic ecological theme". In a retrospective review for Atomic Junk Shop, Fraser Sherman was positive about the series, noting it "was good stuff, but not successful stuff". D. Aviva Rothschild also felt the lack of completion was frustrating, calling M.I.C.R.A. "first-rate science fiction" when covering Graphic Album No. 1 for reference book Graphic Novels.

== Collected Editions ==
An album containing the first three issues, a foreword by Waldron and early sketches by Boonthanakit was released by Fictioneer in 1988. As of 2026, issues #4-7 have not been collected.

Title	ISBN	Release date	Issues
M.I.C.R.A.: Mind Controlled Remote Automaton Graphic Album No. 1		October 1988	M.I.C.R.A.: Mind Controlled Remote Automaton #1–3
