= Lilwall =

Lilwall is a surname. Notable people with the surname include:

- Rob Lilwall (born 1976), British-born adventurer
- Steve Lilwall (born 1970), English footballer
