= Cardiac Risk in the Young =

British health charity

CRY logo

Cardiac Risk in the Young (CRY) is a humanitarian charitable organisation helping to raise awareness of young sudden cardiac death (YSCD, SCD), including sudden arrhythmic death syndrome (SADS, SDS). CRY was established in May 1995 by Alison Cox MBE and is based in the United Kingdom.

The charity supports the families of victims of YSCD, facilitates the heart screening of young people through cardiac testing programmes and contributes to medical research.

== Objectives ==
- Raising awareness of young sudden cardiac death amongst the general public and within the medical community
- Providing appropriate support to affected families, including expert cardiac pathology
- Increasing early diagnosis through cardiac screening for young people
- Improving the management of young people identified with cardiac conditions
- Furthering research into young sudden cardiac death

The CRY General Election Manifesto 2015 states: “Through awareness, support and screening many deaths can be prevented, and research into these conditions will be the key to providing the knowledge crucial to saving these young lives.”

== Activities ==
CRY offers support to those who have suffered tragedies through a network of trained volunteer bereavement supporters, counselling groups and medical information. The charity also offers support and regular meetings to young people diagnosed with a cardiac condition through their myheart Network.

CRY holds regular subsidised ECG screening clinics for those aged 14 to 35 across the UK, with the majority of events funded by bereaved families and free to the public.

The charity funds an expert centre for fast-track cardiac pathology in the UK, the CRY Centre for Cardiac Pathology (CRY CCP) at St George's Hospital, London. The centre is directed by Professor Mary Sheppard. Pathology is free of charge when the cause of death is unascertained and the deceased was aged 35 or under. CRY also funds the CRY Centre for Inherited Cardiovascular Disease and Sports Cardiology at St George’s Hospital. Professor Sanjay Sharma, medical director of the London Marathon, is CRY’s consultant cardiologist and leads their research programme.

== CRY can provide information on ==
- Hypertrophic cardiomyopathy (HCM)
- Arrhythmogenic right ventricular dysplasia (ARVC)
- Dilated cardiomyopathy (DCM)
- Restrictive cardiomyopathy (RCM)
- Myocarditis
- Coronary artery disease (CAD)
- Ion Channelopathies – Long QT syndrome (inc. Jervell and Lange-Nielsen syndrome & Romano–Ward syndrome), Brugada, Lev–Lenegre's syndrome)
- Wolff–Parkinson–White syndrome (WPW)
- Coronary artery anomaly (CAAs)
- Marfan syndrome
- Other cardiac conditions – Endocardial fibroelastosis (EFE), Tachycardia, Antibiotic prophylaxis, Eosinophilic granulomatosis with polyangiitis, Right bundle branch block (RBBB), Kawasaki disease

== Postcard Campaigns ==
On 15 July 2004 CRY launched its National Postcard Campaign to highlight the deaths of eight young people per week from undiagnosed heart problems by featuring their pictures. The campaign was launched at a Parliamentary Reception in Westminster. From August 2004 the Postcard has been re-launched as region specific including South West, North East, South, North West, Scotland and Wales versions. In February 2009 the postcard campaign was updated to "12 a week" and continues to draw attention the number of young people with undetected heart conditions.

== Patrons ==
- Sir Ian Botham OBE – former England cricketer, honorary president of CRY
- Rob Andrew MBE – former England rugby union international, RFU director of elite rugby
- John Barrowman MBE – actor, singer, dancer, musical theatre performer, writer and television personality
- Jeremy Bates – former British tennis player
- Ben Brown – BBC journalist
- Clive Clarke – former professional footballer
- James Cracknell OBE – former British rower, winner of two Olympic gold medals
- Brian Dooher – former Tyrone Gaelic football player
- Nick Easter – Harlequins and England rugby player
- Jonny Evans – West Bromwich Albion and Northern Ireland footballer
- Baroness Ilora Finlay – independent crossbench member of the House of Lords
- Simon Halliday – former England rugby union international
- Kathryn Harries – director of the National Opera Studio, soprano
- Michael Hoey – professional golfer
- John Inverdale – BBC Sport presenter and journalist
- Tom James MBE – British rower, double Olympic gold medallist
- Pat Jennings OBE KSG – former Northern Ireland goalkeeper
- Robert Jones MBE – Wales rugby union coach and former player
- Rob Key – former captain of Kent County Cricket Club, England cricketer
- Pixie Lott – singer, songwriter and actress
- Emily Maitlis – BBC News presenter
- Graeme McDowell MBE – professional golfer, US Open winner and Ryder Cup player
- Professor William McKenna – professor of cardiology
- Lee Mears – former England rugby union international
- Bill Neely – NBC chief global correspondent
- Lawrence Okoye – British Olympic athlete, GB men's discus record holder, American football player
- Phil Packer MBE – former major in the British Armed Forces, fundraiser for charities that help young people
- Sir Steven Redgrave CBE – former British rower, winner of five Olympic gold medals
- Joe Root – England and Yorkshire cricketer
- Andy Scott – former professional football player and manager
- Roger Taylor MBE – former British tennis player
- Professor Gaetano Thiene – professor of cardiology
- Gregor Townsend MBE – former Scotland rugby union international
- Andrew Triggs Hodge MBE – GB rowing, double Olympic gold medallist
- Matt Wells – GB Rowing, Olympic bronze medallist
- Ray Wilkins MBE – former England international footballer
- Sir Clive Woodward OBE – World Cup winning England rugby union coach, director of elite performance for the British Olympic Association
