= Marin Medak =

Slovenian adventurer

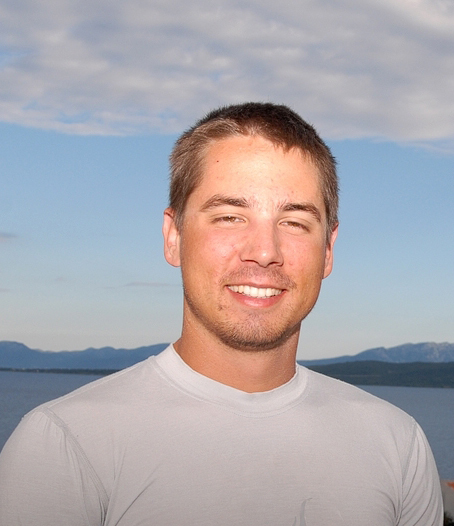
Marin Medak

Marin Medak (born 1987) is a Slovenian adventurer.

Medak is one of the youngest ocean rowing expedition leader and the first Slovenian to row across the Atlantic Ocean.

Medak graduated from the Faculty of Electrical Engineering at the University of Ljubljana in 2016. He started sea kayaking in early 2009 and after four months departed for his first solo sea kayaking adventure. He paddled the islands of Dalmatia (Croatia), starting at Lošinj (Croatia)and finishing in Zadar (Croatia).

A year after he kayaked solo 1400 km from Savudrija (Croatia) to the Island of Zakynthos (Greece).

In 2011, he persuaded experienced sea kayaker Simon Osborne (UK) to come with him to South Korea. In March 2011, after 23 days of temperature around or below freezing, the duo become the first to successfully paddle the length of the coast of South Korea. In the same year Medak and his Paralympian friend Gal Jakič try to set a speed record for kayaking the coast of Croatia, but had to abort the expedition due to medical problems.

After three years of adventures around the world it was time for Medak to live his dreams and row across the Atlantic Ocean. In early 2012 he successfully skippered a four-man Slovenian-British Ocean Rowing expedition Tušmobil TransAtlantik. He was joined by three UK rowers, Simon Osborne, Stephen Bowens and Alastair Humphreys.

Medak is supporting and raising funds for Društvo KROS, a charity organization that helps with children rehabilitation after neural injuries.

After his extreme expeditions, Medak ventured into entrepreneurship.

In April 2013 he launched a keyring brand, Hobkey, with keyrings for sea and whitewater kayakers, scuba divers and canoeists. At the end of 2013, Medak and Gigodesign, a design studio from Ljubljana, began developing Oivo, a compact emergency iPhone charger powered by two AA batteries. The device was designed to be carried on a key ring.

Oivo was launched on Kickstarter in September 2014, but the team cancelled the campaign after 18 days. Medak later said that the timing of the campaign shortly before the introduction of a new iPhone was one of several mistakes made during the launch.

In January 2015 Marin joined forces with an Australian adventurer, Huw Kingston, to become the first to row the Eastern Mediterranean from Tunisia to Turkey. They started in Hammamet stopped in Malta, Foinikounta, Monemvasia and finished 1750 kilometers and 49 days later in Çeşme. For the last two legs, Dimitris Kokkoris joined the expedition. Due to delays by unfavorable winds, Huw had to skip the last let and end his rowing leg earlier, to continue his bigger expedition Mediterr Année.

In 2019, Medak co-founded the optical retailer Della Spina. In addition to offering online ordering and home trials, Della Spina opened its first physical optical store in Ljubljana in July 2019 and a second location in Maribor in June 2023. In 2019, the Della Spina project received two Netko awards, for best company or startup presentation and best online store. Medak later founded Relenser, a company providing online ordering and replacement of prescription lenses in customers' existing eyeglass frames.

== Expeditions ==
Period	Expedition	Distance	Description
July 2009	Padlling the coast of Dalmatia	700 kilometers	Start 13.7.2009 island of Lošinj – paddling to Dubrovnik – back to Zadar. Finishing 13. August 2009. Time needed: 1 month.
2010	Savudrija - Zakynthos	1400 kilometers	Paddling from Savudrija ( Croatia ) to Zakynthos ( Greece ). Time needed: 1 month.
2011	Expedition South Korea	1100 kilometers	Start in Jeongok Harbor (South Korea) and finishing at Sokcho Harbor (South Korea). Time needed: 23 days.
2011	Croatian coast speed record	550 kilometers	Starting at Prevlaka peninsula (Croatia ), with an intended finish in Piran (Slovenia) Expedition aborted on the island of Unije for medical reasons. Marin continued solo and finished in Piran (Slovenia). Time needed: 10 days.
2012	Expedition Tušmobil Transatlantik2012	4700 kilometers	Rowing across the Atlantic ocean Start on Gran Canaria (Spain) and finishing in Port St Charles (Barbados). Time needed: 45 days and 15h.
2015	Expedition Eastern Mediterranean	1750 kilometers	Started in Hammamet (Tunisia), stopped in Malta, Foinikounta (Greece), Monemvasia (Greece) and finished in Çeşme (Turkey) . Time needed: 49 days.
2016-2021	Male avanture (Small adventures)		He and his camera guy are exploring Slovenia & Croatia on adventures that last for 2–3 days.

== Environmental advocacy ==
In 2016, Medak took part in protests against Bohinj Municipality's introduction of fees and mandatory entry and exit points for non-motorized watercraft on Lake Bohinj. At a protest in February, attended by approximately one hundred people, he argued that lakes and other bodies of water should remain freely accessible as public goods and that paddlers should not be charged merely for placing their own equipment in the water. Medak subsequently presented the paddlers' position to the Bohinj municipal council. After the council maintained the ordinance, the paddlers announced further protests and plans to challenge it through legal proceedings. Municipal representatives maintained that the fees covered designated access points and related infrastructure rather than access to the lake itself. According to Slovenske novice, Bohinj mayor Franc Kramar subsequently announced that the municipality would seek criminal prosecution of Medak after he published excerpts from recordings of a municipal council meeting in which councillors discussed their reasons for imposing the fees.

In May 2020, Medak and environmental activist Rok Rozman were among four protesters who were removed and taken to a police station during a sit-in outside the Ministry of the Environment and Spatial Planning. The protest opposed provisions in the third COVID-19 relief package that would restrict the participation of environmental organizations in administrative procedures. Medak challenged the fine issued to him. In 2022, the court discontinued the proceedings against him, finding that the evidence did not establish that he had refused to identify himself and that the police order to leave the area was not lawful. A subsequent review by the Ministry of the Interior concluded that the police had lacked a legal basis for taking him to the police station and using coercive measures.
