= Leon McCarron =

Leon McCarron (born 1986) is a Northern Irish adventurer, filmmaker and author. He is a Fellow of the Royal Geographical Society, and specialises in storytelling via long distance, human-powered journeys. Most recently, he walked 1000 miles from Jerusalem to Mount Sinai along a series of new hiking trails in the region.

== Biography ==
At the end of 2012 McCarron crossed 1000 miles of the Empty Quarter desert with Alastair Humphreys, roughly following the route of explorer Wilfred Thesiger and pulling a cart loaded with supplies. In May 2012 he concluded a 6-month, 3000 mile expedition walking the length of China with Rob Lilwall, from the Gobi Desert in Mongolia to the South China Sea in Hong Kong. National Geographic Channel produced a 4-part TV series of the journey. Other journeys include: 14,000 miles by bicycle from New York to Hong Kong; a folding bike trip around the British Isles to climb the Six Peaks; a human-powered descent of the longest river in Iran, the Karun; and a crossing of Argentine Patagonia on horseback. In 2017 he was the recipient of the Royal Geographical Society's Neville Shulman Challenge Award, and spent a month with the Israelite Samaritans documenting the way of life of perhaps the world's smallest and oldest ethno-religious group. Most recently McCarron has walked on and written about trails in the Balkans and the Caucasus, and has been working in Iraqi Kurdistan and on the Indian Ocean island of Socotra.

McCarron has written three books, including The Road Headed West, and The Land Beyond. His third book, Wounded Tigris, was short-listed for the 2024 Stanford Dolman Travel Book of the Year. He has made three independent films and a TV series. Most recently, McCarron presented a documentary about the Samaritans, with whom he spent time in their village of Kiryat Luza on the West Bank in the Holy Land. It is entitled How to Save a Tribe and was released in 2018.

He was awarded the Cherry Kearton Medal and Award by the Royal Geographical Society in 2024, "for dedication to unearthing the importance, beauty and fragility of natural history."

== Publications ==
- McCarron, Leon (2014). The Road Headed West: A Cycling Adventure Through North America. Chichester, UK: Summersdale Publishers. ISBN 9781849536356.
- McCarron, Leon (2020). The Land Beyond: 1000 Miles on Foot Through the Heart of the Middle East. Bloomsbury Publishing. ISBN 9781786732842.
- McCarron, Leon (2023). Wounded Tigris: A River Journey through the Cradle of Civilisation. Simon and Schuster. ISBN 9781639365081.
