= Rob Lilwall =

British adventurer

Rob Lilwall (born 1976) is a British-born adventurer, author and motivational keynote speaker. He currently lives in Hong Kong, and is one of the most popular and acclaimed professional speakers in Asia.

Lilwall went to school in London and Shropshire (Shrewsbury School) and then studied geography for 4 years at Edinburgh University. After completing his PGCE at Oxford University, he taught geography for two years at Larkmead School in Abingdon, before quitting his job, and setting off on his Cycling Home From Siberia expedition

== Cycling Home From Siberia ==
Lilwall's life changing expedition began in 2004 when he flew to the north-eastern Siberian city of Magadan with his bicycle Alanis (named after singer–songwriter Alanis Morissette) and setting off to ride back home. The journey of over 30,000 miles (50,000 kilometres) through 28 countries eventually took him over three years (2004–2007) and took him on detours through Papua New Guinea, Australia, Tibet, Afghanistan and Iran. To cross the sea between landmasses and islands, Lilwall always caught ferries, or hitch-hiked on yachts, cargo ships and dive boats. During the journey was robbed twice, caught malaria, camped at minus forty and was twice knocked off by motor vehicles. He also became the first person to take a bicycle over the Kokoda Trail.

His first book "Cycling Home From Siberia" was published in August 2009 by Hodder & Stoughton, to excellent reviews from the British press. The book was also published as a North American edition by Howard Books (Simon & Schuster), and translated into Korean, Italian and Danish. A television series about the journey, using Lilwall's original camcorder footage, was made by National Geographic in 2009. The series consists of six 24 minute episodes. It was broadcast in Australia on the Nat Geo Adventure Channel starting Sunday, 7 December 2009. The DVD and download of the series is available directly from Lilwall.

In 2009, Lilwall married Christine Liu, who he had met whilst cycling home from Siberia. They moved back to Christine's native Hong Kong where they set up a Mobilisation Office for the children at risk charity Viva. Now in Asia, Rob began motivational speaking at conferences in the corporate world and planning new expeditions.

== Walking Home From Mongolia Expedition ==
In 2011 Lilwall set off on a new expedition—this time calling it "Walking Home From Mongolia". After flying from Hong Kong to Mongolia, he set off on foot from the Gobi Desert town of Sainshand. He then walked for the following six and a half months, 3,500 miles back to Hong Kong. National Geographic commissioned a TV series about the journey (which was subsequently premiered on the Nat Geo Adventure Channel in December 2013), and so Lilwall also took a cameraman with him on the expedition, the young Northern Irish adventurer Leon McCarron. They endured temperatures down to minus thirty and severe physical hardship as they covered the huge distances with heavy packs. Lilwall wrote a weekly column for the South China Morning Post as he walked, and was given an advance book deal from his previous publisher, Hodder & Stoughton, with publication of the new book in 2013 in the UK, and subsequently translated into German and Chinese. The DVD of the TV series is available from Lilwall.

Lilwall also wrote about the journey for NatGeo Traveller Magazine, and was interviewed by Time Out Magazine, the BBC World Service, BBC Breakfast Television.

== Tandem USA ==
In 2015, Lilwall and his wife Christine rode a tandem bicycle from Los Angeles to New York, via Nevada, Arizona, New Mexico, Texas, Oklahoma, Arkansas, Mississippi, Tennessee, and the east coast.

== Solo across the Desert of Death ==
In 2016, in perhaps his most ambitious expedition to date, Lilwall embarked on a 71-day solo attempt to walk across China's Taklamakan Desert. He was inspired by Major Charles Blackmore's crossing in the late 1990s, but rather than going with a team of camels and people, Lilwall attempted the journey across 1,000 km of sand dunes by hauling a home made beach cart called Odysseus, full of his supplies.

After many adventures and setbacks, Lilwall completed the journey in October 2016, and returned home just in time to be at the birth of his first child.

Whilst Lilwall did complete the crossing, he admitted he did not think it counted as a “first solo” crossing, as for one significant section he was forced to use the Southern Silk Road, traversing through the southern edge of the desert.

Lilwall wrote four articles for the South China Morning Post about the journey.

== Other expeditions and activities ==
Lilwall has often supported the children's charity Viva, on his expeditions, raising over US$100,000 for the charity. He and his wife Christine set up and ran the Hong Kong office of Viva from 2010 to 2014, and Lilwall later joined the board of directors of Viva Network Limited Hong Kong for several years.

Lilwall's serious adventures began in collaboration with his university friend, British Adventurer Alastair Humphreys. Lilwall and Humphreys remain good friends and were best men at each other's weddings.

Lilwall's other, shorter expeditions include:

Cycling across Ireland (1995) the Karakoram Highway in Pakistan (1997), Ethiopia (2002), Bolivia and Peru (2003).

Walking: through Israel, from the Golan Heights, to Masada, via the West Bank towns of Jinin and Nablus (2010), and a lap of the M25 (2010).

Lilwall's adventures in Siberia and elsewhere are also documented in several of Alastair Humphreys' books.

== Personal life ==
Lilwall is a committed Christian, and has a degree in contextual theology from St Mellitus College, London.

Lilwall is married to Christine Liu Lilwall, a former lawyer, who is from Hong Kong. They have two children and since late 2021 they have been based in Singapore.

== Current Projects ==
Lilwall is currently writing a book about his solo expedition across the Taklamakan Desert, due for publication by Hodder & Stoughton in 2023. A film about the expedition is in production with Fforest Films, due for release at film festivals in 2024.

Lilwall's primary work is now as a global corporate, keynote, motivational, and inspirational speaker. He has spoken at numerous high-level corporate conferences, including for Suntory Global Spirits, Nike, Adidas, HSBC, UBS, Goldman Sachs, Prudential, Manulife, the Million Dollar Round Table, Thomson Reuters, Hyatt, Marriott, Symantec and Microsoft. He has spoken at three TEDx events, and is an in-demand speaker globally. Lilwall has given speeches in 20 countries, and in 2017 received the highest credential amongst Speaking Professionals, the Certified Professional Speaker status (CSP) from the National Speakers Association, USA. Since the Covid-19 pandemic Lilwall has also frequently given virtual keynote speeches and workshops to clients all over the world.
