= Lamar Waldron =

American writer and historian (born 1954)

- Born: 1954 (age 71–72)
- Education: Georgia State University
- Occupations: Writer, historian
- Writing career
- Period: 1983–present
- Genre: nonfiction

Lamar Waldron (born 1954) is an American writer and historian who often writes about conspiracies and cover-ups.

== Education ==
Waldron studied at Georgia State University. He has two degrees from Georgia State, including a Masters in Counseling/Psychology.

== Writer ==
=== Comic books ===
Waldron was co-founder and long-time organizer of the Atlanta Fantasy Fair, an annual trade show devoted to comic books and science fiction/fantasy fandom, from 1975 to 1987. During this period he edited and published Visions, the official program booklet of the AFF, which also contained original interviews and comics.

Throughout the 1980s and a good portion of the 1990s, Waldron wrote stories in the comics field, for such publishers as Fictioneer Books, Disney, and Dark Horse Comics. In 1983 Starblaze Graphics published Lightrunner, an "epic science fiction adventure" written by Waldron and illustrated by Rod Whigham. Waldron was the writer of the Fictioneer series M.I.C.R.A.: Mind Controlled Remote Automaton, which ran 7 issues from 1986 to 1988.

=== Nonfiction writing ===
Among the topics Waldron has written about are the assassinations of John F. Kennedy, Martin Luther King, Jr., and Robert F. Kennedy; the United States' plans to overthrow or assassinate Cuban leader Fidel Castro; and the Watergate scandal.

Waldron partnered with radio talk show host Thom Hartmann to produce the 2005 book Ultimate Sacrifice: John and Robert Kennedy, the Plan for a Coup in Cuba, and the Murder of JFK. The research for the book extended over a 20-year period.

Waldron kept the partnership with Hartmann and extended their 2005 work in a new volume using many sources which had recently been declassified. This 2008 book (2009 trade paperback even more extensive), Legacy of Secrecy: The Long Shadow of the JFK Assassination, is currently being made into a movie by Warner Brothers, starring Leonardo DiCaprio, slated for release in the near future. In a review for Vanity Fair, Rob Sheffield wrote: "The book gets infinitely more chaotic when it moves on to the Robert F. Kennedy and Martin Luther King Jr. assassinations, trying to make all the pieces fit together into a theory of everything. You really have to use the index and jump around from chapter to chapter to follow the plot, checking the 2,000 end notes along the way." The Hidden History of the JFK Assassination, an updated and abridged version of Legacy of Secrecy, was published in 2013 by Counterpoint.

In 2012, Counterpoint published Waldron's Watergate: The Hidden History: Nixon, The Mafia, and The CIA. The book states the "driving force" responsible for the Central Intelligence Agency—Mafia assassination attempts on Fidel Castro in 1959-1960 was Richard Nixon, then Vice President of the United States. According to Waldron, Nixon launched the Watergate break-ins to find a dossier that could expose the assassination plots. Barry Forshaw of The Independent included the book on a list of "best non fiction spy releases", stating that Waldron "provides much new information on the involvement of the Mafia, and assassination attempts on Fidel Castro are tied into Richard Nixon when he was vice president; even at this historical distance, it’s incendiary stuff". The Washington Independent Review of Books wrote that the book uses newly released information from government files which Waldron "combines with his encyclopedic knowledge of existing assassination history to draw a new picture of the Watergate plumbers, their master and their motives". While a review in Publishers Weekly writes: "One vast conspiracy begets another in this meticulous but unconvincing theory of the Watergate scandal."

== Selected bibliography ==
- Ultimate Sacrifice: John and Robert Kennedy, the Plan for a Coup in Cuba, and the Murder of JFK, with Thom Hartmann. New York: Carroll & Graf (2005). ISBN 978-1-84529-338-3.
- Legacy of Secrecy: The Long Shadow of the JFK Assassination, with Thom Hartmann. Berkeley, Calif.: Counterpoint (2009). ISBN 978-1-58243-535-0.
- The Hidden History Of The JFK Assassination. Berkeley, Calif.: Counterpoint (2013). ISBN 978-1-61902-261-4.
- Watergate: The Hidden History: Nixon, The Mafia, and The CIA. Berkeley, Calif.: Counterpoint (2020). ISBN 978-1-58243-813-9.
