= David Anthony Kraft =

American writer, publisher, and critic (1952–2021)

- Born: May 31, 1952 Devils Lake, North Dakota, U.S.
- Died: May 19, 2021 (aged 68) Gainesville, Georgia, U.S.
- Areas: Critic, writer
- Pseudonyms: DAK, Dave the Dude
- Notable works: Comics Interview, The Defenders
- Spouse: Jennifer Bush-Kraft

David Anthony Kraft (May 31, 1952 – May 19, 2021) was an American comic book writer, publisher, and critic. He was primarily known for his long-running journal of interviews and criticism, Comics Interview, as well as for work for Marvel Comics in the late 1970s and early 1980s.

== Writing career ==
Before his comics career, Kraft worked as a rock and roll journalist. In September 1976, he became editor of FOOM with issue #15, Marvel's self-produced fan magazine, lasting as editor until the magazine's final issue (#22) in 1978.

Known for his offbeat approach, Kraft first made a name for himself as a comic book author with his work on Marvel Comics' The Defenders, particularly the 1977 "Scorpio Saga" story-arc (issues #46, 48–50). In The Defenders, Kraft wrestled with large philosophical issues: the temptations of power, the Cold War and nuclear power, sibling rivalry, and growing old alone. Kraft also merged his interests in music and comics by inserting multiple references to the band Blue Öyster Cult into his Defenders stories specifically the "Xenogenesis: Day of the Demons" storyline, issues #58–60. Kraft combined music and comics in his scripting of the Marvel Super Special #4 featuring The Beatles. Marvel Super Special #7, an adaptation of the film Sgt. Pepper's Lonely Hearts Club Band, by Kraft and artists George Pérez and Jim Mooney was promoted on the "Bullpen Bulletins" page in Marvel Comics cover-dated January 1979. It was never published in the U.S. "because the book was late and the movie proved to be a commercial failure," according to a contemporaneous news account.

Kraft wrote the Man-Wolf feature in Creatures on the Loose and Marvel Premiere and featured the character in The Spectacular Spider-Man Annual #3 (1981). He wrote the entire run, except the first issue, of Savage She-Hulk, which ran from 1980 to 1982. Kraft worked on such titles as Captain America and scripted the first story drawn by John Byrne for Marvel Comics: "Dark Asylum," published in Giant-Size Dracula #5 (June 1975).

In the early to mid-1980s Kraft wrote children's storybooks featuring Marvel characters such as Spider-Man, the Hulk, and the Fantastic Four for the Children's Press, Marvel Books, and Simon & Schuster. During this same time, he wrote the interactive game books Ghost Knights of Camelot for Avon, and Robot Race for Scholastic books. In 1983–1984, Kraft wrote World's Finest Comics for DC Comics, including that series' issue #300 (Feb. 1984). After that, Kraft did occasional comics writing, but mostly focused his energies on publishing and criticism. In 1995, Kraft worked as story-editor and scripter for the short-lived animated series G.I. Joe Extreme. Kraft was the co-writer and editor of Yi Soon Shin: Warrior and Defender by Onrie Kompan Productions, LLC.

== Publisher, critic and literary agent ==
=== Fictioneer Books ===
In 1974, Kraft founded the specialty science fiction publisher Fictioneer Books. Over the years, Fictioneer published books by such authors as A. E. van Vogt, Robert E. Howard, Jack London, Otis Adelbert Kline, and Don McGregor.

Fictioneer and its imprint Comics Interview Group published magazines including David Anthony Kraft's Comics Interview, the newspaper-comic-strip reprint magazine Comics Revue, and trade journals such as the trade text 100 Hot Tips from Top Comics Creators (1994). In early 1985 Comics Interview Group branched out into comic books by taking on Henry and Audrey Vogel's Southern Knights (previously a self-published series). In 1986 they expanded their comics lineup with M.I.C.R.A. and Aristocratic Xtraterrestrial Time-Traveling Thieves, and began publishing a number of Southern Knights reprints in the form of graphic novels, one-shots, and limited series. Though 1988 saw them also introduce Julie Woodcock and Brian Stelfreeze's CyCops, none of their comics publications sold as well as Southern Knights, and by the end of that year they had stopped publishing any other titles. In mid-1989, Southern Knights was canceled as well, and the Comics Interview imprint was again devoted solely to magazines and trade publications although they would co-publish Southern Knights No. 35 and 36 in 1992.

Comics Interview

In 1983, Kraft founded David Anthony Kraft's Comics Interview, which ran for 150 issues between 1983 and 1995, and garnered Eisner and Eagle Award nominations. As suggested by the title, each issue of Comics Interview was filled entirely with in-depth creator interviews. The concept was pitched to Kraft by Jim Salicrup, who was inspired to have a magazine which explored the comics industry in the same way that the magazine Interview explored the film industry, through interviews of people within the industry.

=== Literary agent ===
Since 1974, Kraft was the literary agent for the estate of pulp author Otis Adelbert Kline.

== Influences and personal life ==
Kraft counted science fiction author Leigh Brackett, Stan Lee, and writer E. Hoffmann Price as mentors.

Kraft died from COVID-19 on May 19, 2021. He is survived by his wife, Jennifer Bush-Kraft and son, Bryce Bush.

== Bibliography ==
=== Books ===
- Sgt. Pepper's Lonely Hearts Club Band (Junior Press, 1979)
- The Compleat OAK Leaves: Volume One of the Official Journal of Otis Adelbert Kline and his Works (editor) (Fictioneer Press, 1980)
- Stan Lee Presents the Incredible Hulk pop-up book (Marvel Comics Group, 1980)
- Captain America: The Secret Story of Marvel's Star-Spangled Super Hero (Children's Press, 1981)
- The Fantastic Four: The Secret Story of Marvel's Cosmic Quartet (Children's Press, 1981)
- The Incredible Hulk: The Secret Story of Marvel's Gamma-powered Goliath (Children's Press, 1981)
- Attack of the Tarantula (Intervisual Communications, 1982)
- The Dark Crystal (Marvel Books, 1982)
- Stan Lee Presents the Incredible Hulk Pop-up Book, "Trapped" (Marvel Comics Group, 1982)
- Fantastic Four vs. the Frightful Four coloring book (Marvel Books, 1983)
- Heathcliff, #1 Cat at the Show coloring and activity book (Marvel Books, 1983)
- Heathcliff at The Circus coloring book (Marvel Books, 1983)
- The Treasure of Time (Marvel Books, 1983)
- The Amazing Spider-Man: The Big Top Mystery (Marvel Books, 1984)
- The Amazing Spider-Man and Wolverine in The Crime of the Centuries (Marvel Books, 1984)
- Ghost Knights of Camelot (Avon Books, 1984) ISBN 978-0-380-89276-1
- Micro Adventure no. 6: Robot Race (Scholastic, 1984) ISBN 0-590-33170-1
- Marvel Super Heroes Secret Wars: Captain America and Iron Man in Escape from Doom (Budget Books, 1986)
- Marvel Super Heroes Jumbo Coloring & Activity Book (Marvel Books, 1987)

=== Short stories ===
- "Incantation," Weirdbook #3, 1970
- "Myrra," Amazing Science Fiction Stories, September 1971

=== Comic books ===
==== Atlas/Seaboard Comics ====
- Demon Hunter #1 (1975)

==== DC Comics ====
- Blackhawk #247–248 (1976)
- Kamandi, The Last Boy on Earth #44–46 (1976)
- Richard Dragon, Kung-Fu Fighter #11–12 (1976)
- Secret Society of Super Villains #2–4 (1976)
- Swamp Thing #24 (1976)
- Tarzan #254 (1976)
- World's Finest Comics #293, 295–300, 302–307 (1983–1984)

==== Marvel Comics ====
- Captain America #221 (with Steve Gerber), 265–266, 271, 273–274 (1978, 1982)
- Creatures on the Loose #33–37 (Man-Wolf) (1975)
- Defenders #44–56, 58–68, 89 (1977–1980)
- Giant-Size Dracula #4–5 (1975)
- Haunt of Horror #5 (1975)
- The Hulk #24 (1980)
- Logan's Run #2–5 (1977)
- Marvel Comics Super Special #4 (The Beatles Story) (1978)
- Marvel Fanfare #4 (Deathlok), #17 (Hulk) (1982–1984)
- Marvel Premiere #45–46 (1978–1979)
- Marvel Preview #12–14 (1977–1978)
- Marvel Spotlight #33 (1977)
- Marvel Super Special #7 (Sgt. Pepper's Lonely Hearts Club Band); #24 (The Dark Crystal) (1979–1983)
- Marvel Super-Heroes vol. 2 #15 (1993)
- Marvel Team-Up #109 (1981)
- Marvel Two-in-One #41, 88–89, 94–95 (1978–1983)
- Savage She-Hulk #2–25 (1980–1982)
- The Spectacular Spider-Man Annual #3 (1981)
- Tales of the Zombie #8 (1974)
- Tarzan #12, 15–21 (1978–1979)
- Thor #252–253 (Tales of Asgard backup stories) (1976)
- What If...? #37 (1983)

=== Television ===
- G.I. Joe Extreme (1996–1997)

Preceded by Gerry Conway	The Defenders writer 1977–1979	Succeeded by Ed Hannigan
Preceded by Stan Lee	Savage She-Hulk writer 1980–1982	Succeeded by n/a
Preceded by Doug Moench	World's Finest Comics writer 1983–1984	Succeeded by Kurt Busiek
