= Media space =

Online working environment

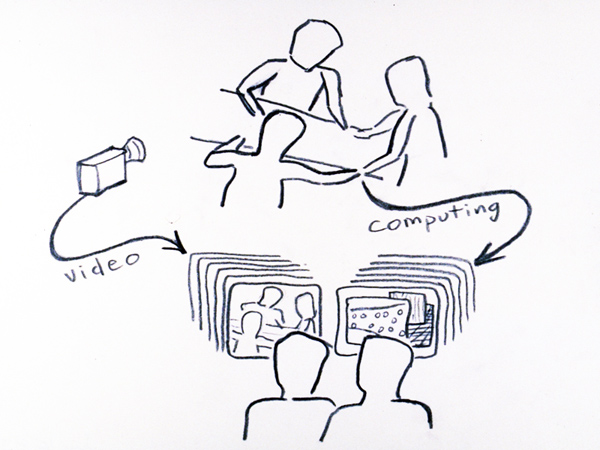
An original concept drawing of a media space by Robert Stults from 1982.

Media spaces are electronic settings in which groups of people can work together, even when they are not present in the same place and time. In a media space, people can create real-time visual and acoustic environments that span physically separate areas. They can also control the recording, accessing and replaying of images and sounds from those environments. After its initial conceptualization in the late 1980s, media spaces has gone through a rapid and significant evolution that allowed for its current widespread use, which was mainly influenced by the mobilization & individualization of technological media and the variety that this trend has brought to the tech world.

== Research and development ==
Media Spaces were the subject of research during the mid- and late-1980s, led by Robert Stults and Steve Harrison, in the Smalltalk group at Xerox Palo Alto Research Center (PARC). The research was carried out in the Design and Media Spaces Area of the Software Concepts Laboratory, as part of a larger inquiry into systems and media to support the social process of design.

The Media Space at Xerox PARC was implemented in laboratory sites in Palo Alto, California, and Portland, Oregon. These employed live and recorded audio and video, video and audio switching, networked workstations and servers, and inter-site network connection, in order to provide for a form of telepresence within offices and work areas at the two sites. Interactions among staff at the sites were conveyed in real time by video and audio, and by the networked workstations; and the interactions were recorded and played back, and digital indexes of the records were prototyped. The live and recorded interactions permitted communications among the connected spaces, as well as asynchronous participation. Recording and retrieval, integrated with persistent live connection, was a major distinguishing feature between Media Space and videoconferencing as it was understood at the time.

=== Modernization of the technology ===
Early research surrounding media spaces has played a pioneering role in the development and use of new media spaces— which have started gaining momentum in the early 2000s with the commercialization of internet access and comparably mobile, single-user devices. The concept has consequentially evolved into encompassing a wider spectrum of utilization techniques and styles as the practice was no longer depended on fixed-station installations to function. Soon, the development of software that establish the said recording and retrieval through a continuous live (internet) connection on demand followed, making the function of creating media spaces within singular yet versatile devices possible. This newfound convenience surrounding the use of media spaces also played a part in the prevalence of such devices and mobile applications to be more on demand in the 2010s, further expanding the area of interest and potential for modern media spaces by gradually centralizing the services and their providers.

==== The COVID-19 pandemic ====
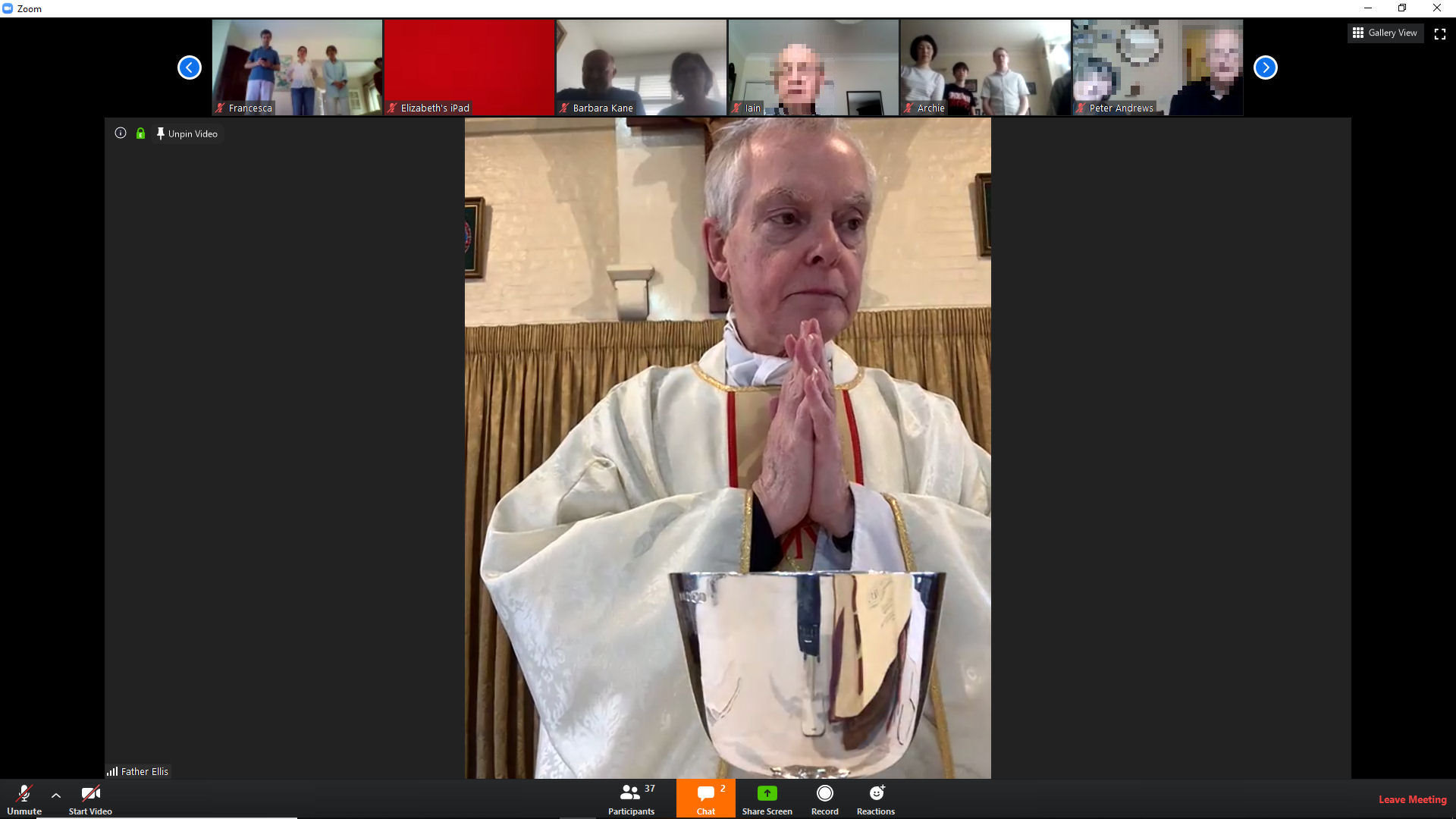
St. Thomas Aquinas Church in a ZOOM session with Fr. Robert Ellis during the COVID-19 lockdown.

After the COVID-19 pandemic started to spread globally, it was necessary to take precautions to control the diseases' spread, and this meant that face to face interactions that were once the norm would also be altered accordingly. With the implementation of social distancing and quarantine campaigns, almost all social and professional interactions were progressively adapted to alternative communication methods worldwide. For most professional settings this meant almost a complete transition to, "work from home" or simply remote work. Specifically in the U.S., such hybrid or remote work was practiced by only 20% of the before the pandemic, and rose up to 71% afterward.

During this time, the rapid integration of modern media space technologies and their utilization as the main vessel to most human interactions has had long-term effects on the overall business practices that are still observable and persistent today. For example, many of the videoconferencing software (i.e. groupware) such as Zoom, Skype, Microsoft Teams, Google Meet, and many more are still actively used by most businesses and educational institutions in the aftermath of the pandemic, although not as much as they did during it. Although these applications seemingly revolve around videoconferencing from the first glance, they share and employ the vision of recording and retrieval features that earlier media space research had experimented with through features like session recording, cloud uploads, and screensharing.

== See also ==
- Remote work
- Virtual workplace
- Virtual community
- Distributed development
- Collaboration technologies
- Collaborative virtual environment
- List of video telecommunication services and product brands
- List of collaborative software
