= Bill Neely =

Journalist from Northern Ireland

- Born: 21 May 1959 (age 67); Glengormley, County Antrim, Northern Ireland
- Occupations: Broadcast journalist, foreign correspondent
- Notable credit(s): ITV News, NBC News
- Spouse: Marion Kerr
- Children: 2

Bill Neely (born 21 May 1959) is a retired Irish journalist. He was the Chief Global Correspondent for NBC News from 2014 to 2021. He has been a broadcaster since 1981. Neely spent 25 years at ITN's ITV News. He now teaches & mentors journalists around the world.

== Early life and education ==
Neely was born in Glengormley, County Antrim, Northern Ireland, in 1959 and graduated with joint honours in Modern History and English from Queen's University of Belfast. He was named the Queen's University Graduate of the Year in 2021 for his work as a broadcaster.

== Career ==
Bill Neely has covered many of the major world news events over four decades, including the fall of the Berlin Wall, which he describes as "the best story I ever covered", the break-up of the Soviet Union, numerous wars and terrorist attacks including 9/11, multiple natural disasters and national elections, particularly in the United States.

He began his career with BBC Northern Ireland in 1981, covering the violence there for six years before joining the BBC in London in 1987. He was hired by Sky News in 1989 to help launch the channel. He joined ITN in June 1989.

He has won four BAFTA awards for news coverage, including an unprecedented three consecutive awards (2009–11), an Emmy award, a Monte Carlo Golden Nymph award, a Peabody prize, an Edward R. Murrow award, and numerous other nominations and awards for international news reporting over the past four decades, including eight Emmy nominations for NBC News. He has won four Royal Television Society awards, including the International News Award for coverage of the Haiti earthquake. He has twice been nominated for Broadcasting Journalist of the Year by the London Press Club, winning in 2011.

Neely was Washington correspondent and US Bureau Chief for six years (1991–97), covering two Presidential elections, the Atlanta Olympics and Oklahoma City bombing, the OJ Simpson trial, the Waco siege as well as many major stories across North and South America and the Caribbean. From 1997–2002 he was Europe Correspondent, covering the death of Diana, Princess of Wales for which he was part of the team nominated for a BAFTA award; the crash of Concorde and the wars in Kosovo and Afghanistan. ITN received the Golden Nymph from the Monte Carlo Television Festival, Europe's top award for television journalism, for his work in Kosovo. He has also reported regularly from the Middle East and the United States. For many years Neely was a presenter on ITV News programmes including News at Ten & the ITV Evening News. He also presented many editions of CNN's International Correspondents.

Neely has covered five US Presidential election campaigns since 1992. In addition, he has covered elections in Russia, Germany, France, Canada, the UK, Ireland, Spain, Jamaica, Iran, and Israel, and has interviewed numerous presidents, Prime Ministers and Heads of State.

His reports from the deadly earthquake in China in 2008 won him the 2009 International Emmy Award for News and the 2009 BAFTA Award for Television News. Earlier in 2008 he reported from the Antarctic – 600 miles from the South Pole – on global warming. He covered the 2005 Pakistan earthquake for which ITV News won a Royal Television Society award and, in the same year, the devastating floods in New Orleans and the Asian tsunami. He was nominated for a BAFTA for coverage of the Beslan siege. He was also part of the ITV News team whose reports from the Asian tsunami won the 2005 BAFTA award for news ("Seven Days That Shook The World").

In 2010, he reported on the earthquake in Haiti, for which he won the 2010 BAFTA (British Academy of Film and Television Arts) award for the best news coverage. He covered the campaign of Tony Blair in the 1997 United Kingdom general election and David Cameron in the 2010 general election. He also reported on the killing of Osama bin Laden, the Iranian 'Green Revolution' of 2008, as well as terror attacks in Sri Lanka, the Philippines, India, Pakistan, Nigeria, Egypt, Israel and across Europe.

He reported regularly on the "Arab Spring", firstly from Egypt, then Libya, and during more than a dozen visits to Syria; frontline dispatches that have been broadcast around the world. He interviewed Syrian President Bashar al-Assad in 2016. In October 2013, he was voted one of the 100 most influential journalists in the world covering conflict.

He won the 2011 BAFTA (British Academy of Film and Television Arts) for his reporting of the killings in Cumbria in July 2010; his third BAFTA success in three years. He was twice nominated as Broadcasting Journalist of the Year by the London Press Club, winning the award in 2011.

In 2011, Neely took part in a documentary called As Others See Us which looked back on his reporting of The Troubles in Northern Ireland. He highlighted reporting on the Droppin Well bombing in Ballykelly. He was joined by Peter Taylor, Kate Adie and Martin Bell.

In 2013 he was nominated for the Bayeux War Correspondents Award and the Golden Nymph Award at Monte Carlo for his work in Syria.

On 25 November 2013, it was announced that Neely would be joining NBC News. His final story for ITV News was on the death of Nelson Mandela. He joined NBC News on 20 January 2014.

In 2014, Neely reported on the Syrian and Iraq wars, the Russian invasion of Crimea, the mystery of the missing Malaysian plane MH370, the World Cup in Brazil and the war in Gaza.

With NBC News, Neely was part of the team that won a prestigious Peabody Award for "Continuing Coverage of ISIS" in 2014. Neely reported less than seventy yards from the ISIS front line in Northern Iraq. In 2015 and 2016 he reported on the terrorist massacres in Paris, Nice, and Brussels. He was part of the Nightly News team that won the Edward R. Murrow Award for reports after the Paris attacks of January 2015. He interviewed President Assad of Syria in July 2016 and covered the fall of Aleppo from the city in December 2016. He has interviewed senior officials from North Korea during four trips to the country in 2016–2017 and was told by officials that he was the first Western journalist in 70 years to visit a section of N. Korea's border with China.

Neely received eight Emmy nominations at NBC, including for work on the Brussels terror attacks in 2016 and in the Best Interview category for his exclusive interview with Syria's President Assad.

Neely reported on the COVID crisis of 2020–21 from Hong Kong, Italy, Sweden, Austria, London, and Brazil.

NBC paid tribute to him in broadcasts on the Today show and Nightly News on his final day, 2 April 2021.

Neely recorded a TedX talk in 2022, asking if 'Mainstream Media' are 'Enemies of the People'. He has given talks at several UK Universities.

After retiring from frontline reporting in 2021, Neely began teaching and mentoring television reporters around the world. He has worked for, among others, Sky News, ITV News and Feature Story News, in the US, South Africa, India, Pakistan and across the UK.

== Marriage and family ==
Neely and his wife, Marion Kerr, live in Richmond, London and have two daughters.

Bill Neely has completed eleven London marathons, most recently in 2021 with a time of 3.12.25 and with a best time of 3.09.48 in the 2011 event. He has also competed in Triathlons and regularly takes part in Richmond Park's Parkrun.

He is a patron of the heart charity CRY, Cardiac Risk in the Young and has raised more than £60,000 for it to tackle undiagnosed heart defects in young people.

He has been an active supporter of Leeds United since 1967.
