= Phil Packer =

British charity activist

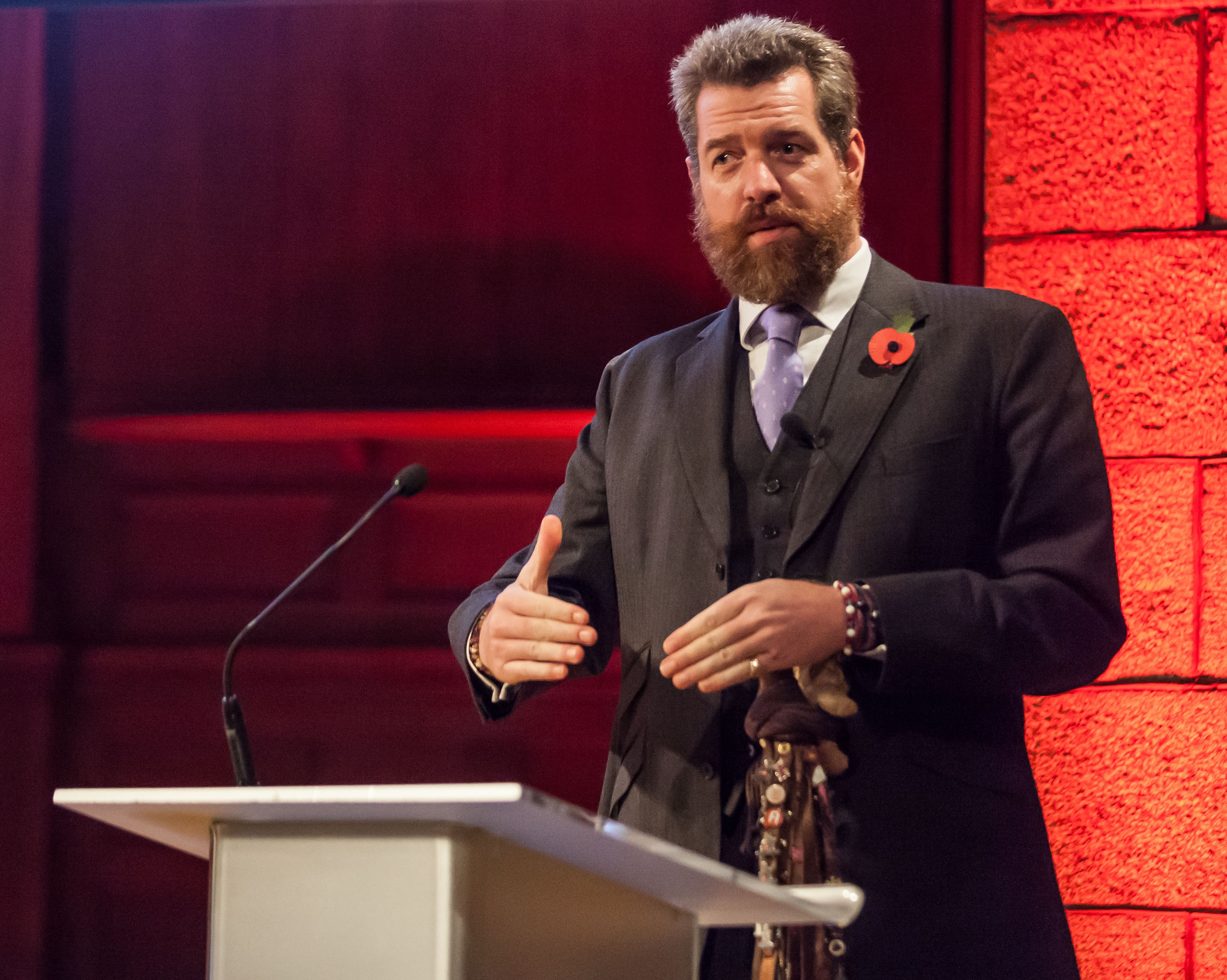
Packer in 2013

Philip Packer MBE (born 1972) is a British charity activist who suffered serious injuries while serving with the British military in Iraq in 2008 and has since engaged in numerous publicised physical challenges in support of his charity, the British Inspiration Trust (BRIT), and other causes.

== Surgery and rehabilitation ==
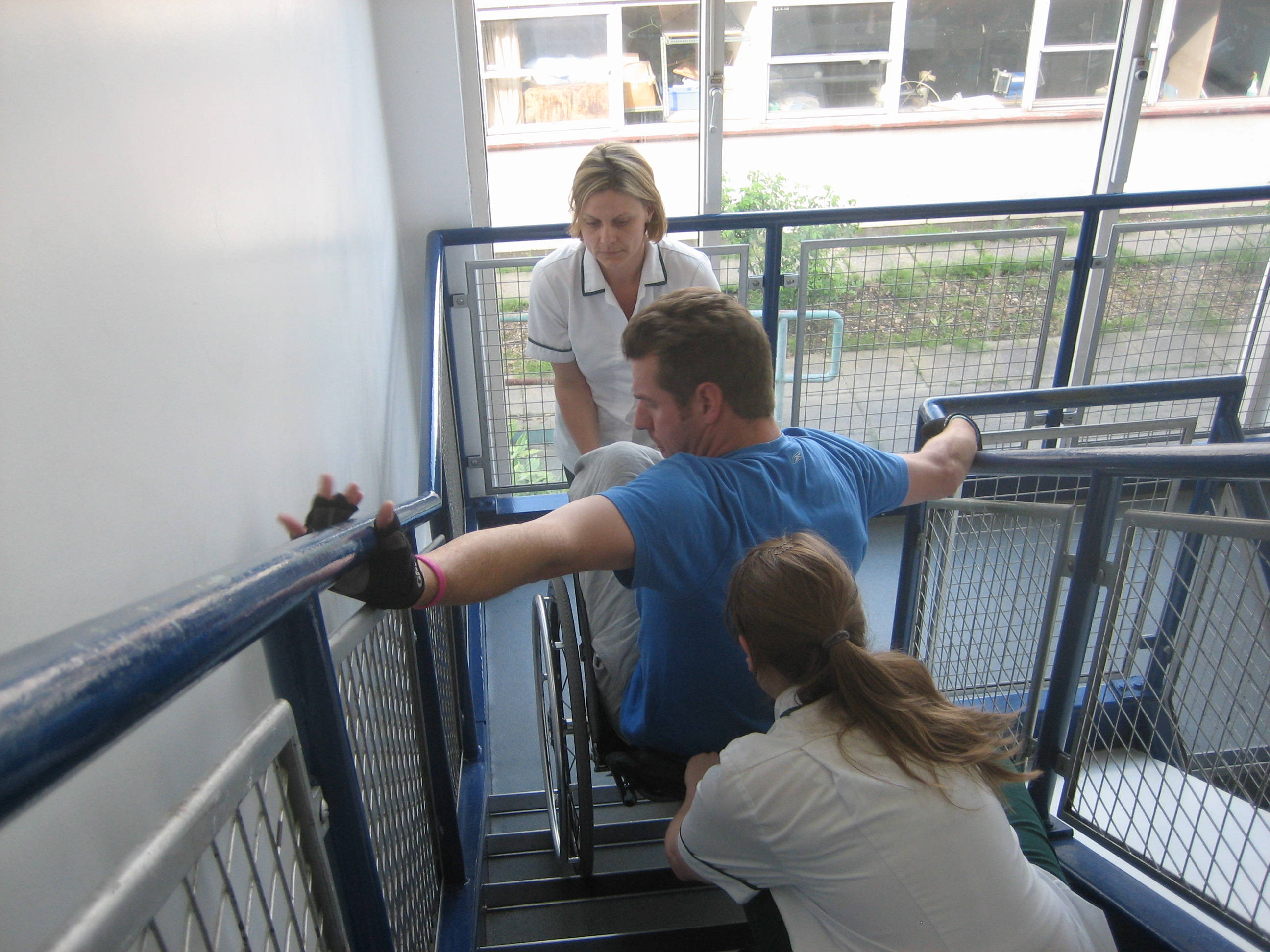
Packer learning how to climb stairs at RNOH Stanmore as a wheelchair user

Packer sustained severe spinal cord injuries in 2008, whilst on operational duty with British military forces in Iraq. He had a motor-complete T12/L1 spinal cord injury, and was told he would never walk again. Following surgery and recuperation, his injury improved to T12/L1 motor-incomplete.

== Physical challenges to raise funds ==
Following his recuperation, Packer has embarked on numerous publicised physical challenges, both to raise money, and to help himself recuperate psychologically from his injuries.

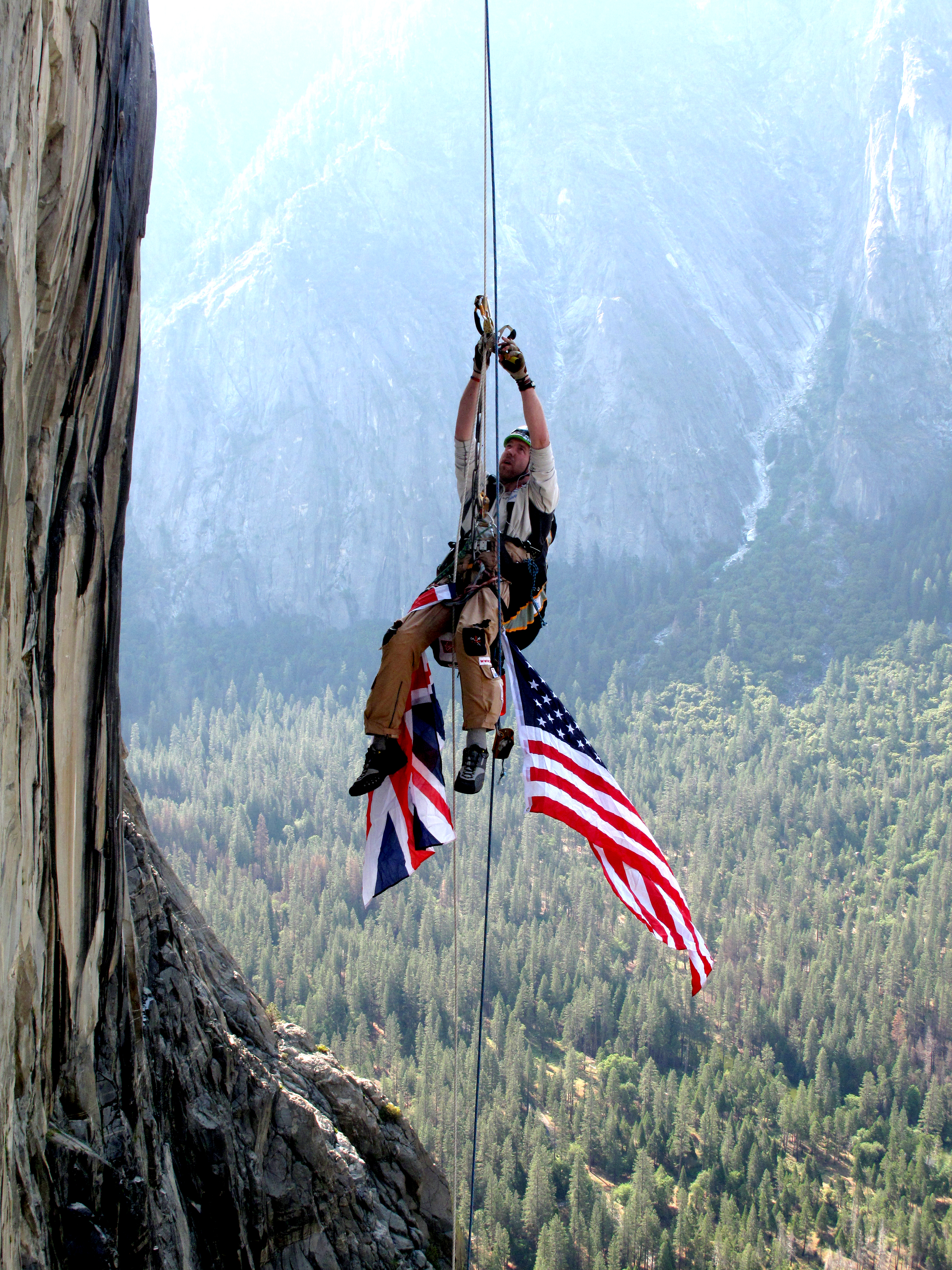
Packer hauling himself up El Capitan

In February 2009, less than a year after his injury, Packer rowed the English Channel with Alastair Humphreys.

Next he entered the 2009 London Marathon. It took him thirteen days to complete the course, then the longest time in the event's history. By the end of the marathon he had raised £637,000 for wounded ex-servicemen.

The same year with support from an expert climbing team led by Andy Kirkpatrick, Packer was brought up El Capitan, the granite cliff in Yosemite National Park, over a period of 3 days.

In 2010 Packer and BBC presenter Kate Silverton, with other personalities, took part in the National Three Peaks Challenge for Sport Relief, climbing the highest peaks in England, Scotland and Wales in 72 hours. The challenge was the focus of the BBC documentary A Major Mountain to Climb.

He also took part in the 2010 London Marathon, completing it in 26 hours.

From January to December 2012, Packer walked 2012 miles throughout the U.K. and Northern Ireland, to raise awareness of his charity.

In September 2015, Packer again walked a marathon through London, taking 14 hours, to raise funds for BRIT.

== Charity positions ==
In 2010, Packer founded the British Inspiration Trust (BRIT), which aims to "deliver inspiration to young people facing adversity (who are physically or mentally disabled, deprived, have medical conditions, are injured or wounded)". The Trust was launched with an event at 10 Downing Street with Prime Minister David Cameron.

His principal role is with BRIT but he has also held positions in other charities:

- Ambassador for The Prince’s Trust (2009–present)
- Special Ambassador for The Royal Yachting Association's Sailability Program (2009–present)
- Ambassador for The Douglas Bader Foundation (2009–present)
- Patron for The National Society for the Prevention of Cruelty to Children NSPCC Team GO (2009–present)
- Patron of Cardiac Risk in the Young (CRY) (2009–present)
- Vice Patron of The Helen Rollason Cancer Charity (2011–present)
- Ambassador for The UK The Scout Association Scout Association (2012–present)
- Ambassador for The Calvert Trust (2009–2014)
- Special Ambassador for The Army Benevolent Fund – The Soldiers' Charity (2009–2014)
- Ambassador for The Football Foundation's Inside Right Programme (2009–2014)
- Envoy for The Royal Navy and Royal Marines Children’s Fund (2010–2014)
- Envoy for Combat Stress (Ex-Services Mental Welfare Society) (2010–2014)
- Envoy for The National Autistic Society (2010–2014)
- Envoy for Arthritis Research UK (2010–2014)
- Vice President of The Children's Trust (2011–2014)
- Envoy for The Papworth Trust (2011–2014)

== Awards ==
In 2009, he won the Helen Rollason Award at the BBC Sports Personality of the Year awards, was "Fundraiser of the Year" at the Pride of Britain Awards, and received the Athlete of the Year Badge from The Scout Association.

Packer was made appointed Member of the Order of the British Empire (MBE) (Mil) in the Queen's Birthday Honours of 2010, and also received the Jane Tomlinson Inspiration Award from Runner's World.

In 2012, Packer was awarded an honorary Master of Arts degree in education from the University of Chichester. In 2014, he was awarded a Master of Arts degree in Psychological Trauma from the University of Chester.
