= Brugada =

Brugada is a surname. Notable people with the surname include:

- Antonio Brugada (1804–1863), Spanish painter
- Clara Brugada (born 1963), Mexican politician and economist

== See also ==
- Brugada syndrome
- Ricardo Brugada, a neighbourhood in Paraguay
