= Atlanta Fantasy Fair =

Science fiction convention held in Atlanta, Georgia

- Status: Defunct
- Genre: Multi-genre
- Venue: Dunfey's Royal Coach (1977–1978, 1980–1981); Omni Hotel & Georgia World Congress Center (1982–1987, 1990); Atlanta Hilton & Towers (1988–1989, 1991); Hyatt Atlanta Airport (1992–1993)
- Locations: Atlanta, Georgia
- Country: United States
- Inaugurated: 1975
- Founders: Gary Cook and Lamar Waldron
- Most recent: 1995
- Attendance: 4,000 (1989)
- Organizer: A.C.F.F., Ltd.
- Filing status: Non-profit

The Atlanta Fantasy Fair (AFF) was a multigenre convention which took place once each summer in Atlanta, Georgia from 1975 to 1995. Organized by A.C.F.F., Ltd., the convention was a nonprofit entity designed to promote the fantasy genre in the American Southeast. Over its two-decade run, the AFF featured hundreds of guests, encompassed hotels in downtown Atlanta and ran thousands of hours of programming for fans of science fiction, fantasy, comic books, and other elements of fandom.

Most AFFs took place over three days, from Friday to Sunday. The convention featured a large range of pop culture elements, primarily comic books but also science fiction/fantasy, film/television, animation, anime, manga, toys, horror, and collectible card games. Along with panels, seminars, and workshops with industry professionals, the AFF often featured previews of upcoming films, and such evening events as a costume contest. The convention featured a large floorspace for exhibitors, including comic book dealers and collectibles merchants.

The Atlanta Fantasy Fair was a family-friendly event that worked on a "membership" basis, which enabled attendees to gain admittance to the show for the entire weekend. The show was known for its program booklet (titled Visions) and for the annual presentation of the Atlanta Fantasy Fair Award for Outstanding Achievement.

== History ==
The Atlanta Comics & Fantasy Fair was founded in 1975 by Harley Anton, Lamar Waldron, and Gary Cook. The first convention was held July 22–24, 1975, at the Ramada Inn and Conference Center located near Interstate 85 and Monroe Drive. The guest of honor was Marvel Comics figurehead Stan Lee. The convention offices were in Morrow, Georgia.

Dr. Kenneth Smith, a local fantasy illustrator, small-press publisher, and philosophy professor, was a guest of every show from 1975 until 1988, when a dispute with an attendee led to him leaving and not coming back.

By 1977 the co-chairmen of the convention were Harley Anton, Gary Cook, and Lamar Waldron.

By 1982, the convention was officially being organized as a nonprofit through the organization Atlanta Comics & Fantasy Fair, Ltd. In 1984, the AFF headquarters were in Marietta, Georgia.

Waldron was displaced as convention chair after the 1986 convention. Terry (alternately spelled as "Terri") Loggins was convention president from 1986–1989. In 1989, the AFF headquarters were in Norcross, Georgia.

The Atlanta Fantasy Fair, Inc. registered as a Georgia Domestic Non-Profit Corporation on August 12, 1991. Their headquarters were in Stockbridge, Georgia, and the two principals were listed as CEO (Felton) Wayne Loggins and CFO David Denton.

By the early 1990s, attendance at AFF was declining, in many ways due to competition with the also Atlanta-based Dragon Con (est. 1987), as well as the collapse of the comic speculator market. The quality of guests began to decline and the show petered out in 1995.

Former Atlanta Fantasy Fair co-organizer Wayne Loggins attempted to rebrand the convention the next year, producing Atlanta StarCon & Comics on November 1–3, 1996. Held at the Atlanta Marriott North Central Hotel, the show boasted such guests as George Pérez, Michael O'Hare, Kane Hodder, Frank Marshall, and Kathleen Kennedy. Programming included a party at Planet Hollywood, a masquerade contest, meals "with the stars," a dealer room, and gaming. The show was not enough of a success to continue the following year.

=== Dates and locations ===
| Dates | Location | Official guests | A.F.F. Award | Notes |
|---|---|---|---|---|
| August 22–24, 1975 | Ramada Inn | Stan Lee, Kenneth Smith, and collector Mike Curtis | N.A. | Membership: $3.50 before June 30; $4.50 at the door |
| 1976 | Marriott Downtown | Frank Brunner, Steve Gerber, Dick Giordano, and Kenneth Smith | N.A. | |
| August 12–14, 1977 | Dunfey's Royal Coach (Castlegate) | Jenette Kahn, Dick Giordano, Kenneth Smith, Neal Adams, and Jim Steranko. | N.A. | A Conan the Barbarian van was parked inside the convention hall |
| 1978 | Dunfey's Royal Coach | Stan Lee, Jim Starlin, Howard Chaykin, Jim Steranko | N.A. | Robert Conrad was seen in the hotel lobby on Saturday night |
| 1979 | Downtown Atlanta Sheraton | John Byrne, Dave Sim | N.A. | |
| July 25–27, 1980 | Dunfey's Royal Coach | Robert Bloch | N.A. | Gil Kane drew the cover of the program and was a scheduled guest, but didn't make it. |
| 1981 | Dunfey's Royal Coach | Al Williamson, Michael Whelan, Bob Burden, Mike Jittlov Dave Cockrum | N.A. | |
| August 13–15, 1982 | Omni Hotel & Georgia World Congress Center | Frank Miller, Ray Harryhausen, Will Eisner, Philip Jose Farmer, Forrest J Ackerman, Bob Burden, Mike W. Barr, Dick Giordano, Brad Linaweaver, Somtow Sucharitkul, Len Wein, musical guests "Axis" | Forrest J Ackerman | |
| August 5–7, 1983 | Omni Hotel & Georgia World Congress Center | Chuck Jones, Theodore Sturgeon, Chris Claremont, Wendy & Richard Pini, Forrest Ackerman, Mike Grell, Ted White, and Bob MacLeod, Gerald W. Page, Bob Burden | Chuck Jones | Membership: $19, rooms $44 a night |
| August 3–5, 1984 | Omni Hotel & Georgia World Congress Center | Larry Niven, Forrest J Ackerman, Robert Bloch, Sharon Webb, Richard Pini, Peter Laird, Kevin Eastman, Fred Hembeck | Robert Bloch | Membership: $25 |
| August 2–4, 1985 | Omni Hotel & Georgia World Congress Center | Newt Gingrich, Will Eisner, Frederik Pohl, Theodore Sturgeon, Gerald W. Page, Ted White, Forrest J Ackerman | Will Eisner | |
| August 2–4, 1986 | Omni Hotel & World Congress Center | Comics guests included Chris Claremont, Denny O'Neil, Stan Lee, Ralph Bakshi, Matt Feazell, Kelly Freas, Dave Gibbons, Greg Hildebrandt, Jim Starlin, John Romita, Sr., Boris Vallejo, and Bob Burden. Science fiction/fantasy writers included Robert Asprin, John Varley, Brad Strickland, and Diane Duane. Media guests included Carl Macek, Don Kennedy, and Steve Jackson of Steve Jackson Games. | Stan Lee | 5,000 attendees |
| July 31–August 2, 1987 | Omni Hotel & Georgia World Congress Center | Adam West, Caroline Munro, Robert Bloch, Boris Vallejo, Kelly Freas, Jennifer Roberson, and Tom Savini | Tom Savini | |
| June 24–26, 1988 | Atlanta Hilton & Towers | Guest of honor was Stan Lee; official guests included Mark Gruenwald, Archie Goodwin, Steven Grant, Bob Burden, Kevin Maguire, Julius Schwartz, and Chris Claremont. | Julius Schwartz | Convention location changed due to 1988 Democratic National Convention in Atlanta; 4,000 attendees) |
| July 21–23, 1989 | Atlanta Hilton & Towers | George Pérez, Michael Dorn, Jerry Robinson, Gary Gygax, Todd Bryant, June Chadwick, Marc Singer, and Marina Sirtis | George Pérez | Membership: $27 before July 7, $30 at the door; 4,000 attendees; scheduled guests Bob Kane and Tom Savini were forced to cancel |
| August 17–19, 1990 | Omni Hotel & Georgia World Congress Center | Jack Kirby, John de Lancie, Sandahl Bergman, Catherine Hicks, Julius Schwartz, Sharon Green, Linda Thorson, Martin Caidin, Greg Theakston, Boris Vallejo, Bobbie Chase, Danny Fingeroth, and Carl Macek | ? | |
| July 26–28, 1991 | Atlanta Hilton & Towers | Marina Sirtis, Dean Stockwell, Marc Singer, Matt Wagner, Julius Schwartz, Greg Bear | Greg Bear | Attendees were offered a sneak preview of Beastmaster 2: Through the Portal of Time, not due to be released until August. |
| June 20–21, 1992 | Hyatt Atlanta Airport | Peter David, Stephen R. Donaldson | Stephen R. Donaldson | |
| June 25–27, 1993 | Hyatt Atlanta Airport | David Prowse, Grace Lee Whitney, Caroline Munro, Monique Gabrielle, Jeff Rector, Gunnar Hanson, Irish McCalla | ? | Membership: $27 until June 5, $30 at door |
| June 17–19, 1994 | Holiday Inn Crowne Plaza | Sarah Douglas, Bruce Campbell, Jeff Rector, Geraint Wyn Davies, John A. Russo, Ted V. Mikels | ? | Membership: $27 until June 5, $30 at door. Rooms $79 single/double, $99 triple/quad |
| June 23–25, 1995 | Castlegate Hotel | Claudia Christian, Dirk Benedict, Dwight Schultz, Jeff Pittarelli, Don Hillsman II, Wayne Vansant, Joe Phillips | ? | Membership: $35 for 3 days. Rooms $69 |

== Visions ==
From 1979 to 1987, the convention produced Visions, a program booklet given out to convention attendees. Each issue of the AFF zine highlighted that year's special guests, publishing biographies and checklists of their work. Each issue also featured pinup illustrations by professional and amateur artists. Visions was published by convention organizers Gary Cook and Lamar Waldron, and then, beginning with issue #4 (1982), under the name Atlanta Comics & Fantasy Fair, Ltd. Visions was edited by Lamar Waldron and was typically 12 in × 9 in (300 mm × 230 mm) in size.

Visions #1 (1979) features the first appearance of Bob Burden's Flaming Carrot. Visions #3 (1981) contains an extremely rare early Flaming Carrot story by Burden.

The AFF published 4,000 copies of Visions #4 (1982), which contained a Frank Miller Batman pinup, a Miller checklist, a Forrest J Ackerman article written by Robert Bloch, artwork by Ray Harryhausen and Will Eisner, and the fourth appearance of Burden's Flaming Carrot.

Visions #5 featured checklists of the books of Robert Bloch and Larry Niven, and "Remembering Boris Karloff" by Forrest J Ackerman. The cover depicted model Susan Barrow (a.k.a. Susie the Floozie).

== Atlanta Fantasy Fair Awards ==
In 1982 the Atlanta Fantasy Fair Award for Outstanding Achievement was established, bestowed for lifetime achievement in the fields of science fiction, fantasy, horror, comics, and related fields in any medium. The prize (sculpted by Edward Knox) was a sterling silver statuette of "Miss Fantasy Fair," with an elaborate headdress and a diamond in one eye.

Winners were required to be present to claim the award, or it would pass to the next choice. The inaugural recipient was science fiction and fantasy fan, spokesman, and promoter Forrest J Ackerman.
