= Microadventure =

Word popularised by Alastair Humphreys

The term microadventure was made common by British adventurer and author Alastair Humphreys and is defined as an overnight outdoor adventure that is "small and achievable, for normal people with real lives". The New York Times described microadventures as "short, perspective-shifting bursts of travel closer to home", in which people might "explore their city by moonlight, or hold a family slumber party in the backyard."

The concept is flexible enough in its definition to allow the individual to choose the location, duration, and overall scope of the adventure. Microadventures are generally considered affordable in that little to no specialized gear is required, travel costs are trivial or nonexistent, and only a minimal amount of provisions are needed for the outing. Often participants will sleep out under the stars using a bivvy bag, rather than a tent, and wild swims are actively encouraged. Microadventures have proved popular with people whose lives are busy with work and/or family commitments.

The Collins Dictionary blog recognised 'microadventure' as a neologism in April 2014. Microadventure is popular as an online hashtag, used on Twitter, Facebook and Instagram to share microadventure experiences.

== Publications ==
In 2012, Humphreys was nominated a National Geographic Adventurer of the Year award for his campaign to involve ordinary people in microadventures.

Humphreys published a microadventures book in June 2014, which documents a series of "short, inexpensive trips" around the UK.

For 2015, Humphreys put together a 'Year of Microadventure', a calendar suggesting activities for followers to take part in once a month, all-year-round.

Microadventures have been discussed on both BBC Radio 5Live and Talk Sport. In the US, Outside Magazine described "The Benefits of Microadventure" in a series of articles written of "A Quest to Boost Happiness". Microadventures were also featured on CNN's "Human to Hero" series and the Huffington Post series. The Financial Times described microadventures as "short, thrilling trips that fit in around work and family commitments." BBC Online featured a microadventure in a series of microvideos.
