= Alastair Humphreys =

English cyclist, adventurer, author and motivational speaker

Alastair Humphreys is an English adventurer and author. Over a four-year period he bicycled 46,000 miles (74,000 km) around the world. He was a National Geographic Adventurer of the Year in 2012. He is responsible for the rise of the idea of the microadventure – short, local, accessible adventures.

== Biography ==
Humphreys studied at the University of Edinburgh and completed a PGCE at Oxford. He began his first expedition in August 2001 from his Yorkshire home. Passing south through Europe and Africa, he crossed to South America by sea from Cape Town and proceeded up the west coast of the Americas, crossed from Alaska to Magadan in Russia, Japan then westward across China and Central Asia to return to Europe. His journey included raising funds and awareness for a charity called Hope and Homes for Children.

Humphreys arrived home in November 2005, having ridden over 46,000 miles (74,000 km) in four years and three months. He has written several books about his experiences, titled Moods of Future Joys, Ten Lessons from the Road, Thunder and Sunshine and a series of three children's books called The Boy Who Biked the World. Humphreys also wrote a book about walking across India called There Are Other Rivers.

In 2008, Humphreys competed in the Marathon des Sables, a 150 miles (240 km) run across the Sahara desert. He broke his foot during the race but still completed the event. He narrowly missed being in the top-100 finishers.

In February 2009, Humphreys rowed across the English Channel with Major Phil Packer to raise £1 million for Help for Heroes. In spring 2009, Humphreys walked across India, and in 2010 he walked and packrafted across Iceland.

His 2011 "Year of Microadventure" earned him the National Geographic accolade of an "Adventurer of the Year". Humphreys pioneered the concept and coined the term "microadventure" and the hashtag "#microadventure" is now used as a popular hashtag on social media sites.

In 2012, he joined Marin Medak, Simon Osborne and Steve Bowens to row unsupported across the Atlantic Ocean. The team successfully finished their journey in Barbados after 45 days and 15 hours at sea. He also walked across the Empty Quarter desert with Leon McCarron and undertook an expedition in Greenland.

In 2013, Humphreys released his first documentary film, Into the Empty Quarter, documenting his walk through the Empty Quarter desert with Leon McCarron The film premiered at the Royal Geographical Society, London, in November 2013. In 2020, Humphreys appeared on the podcast Trees A Crowd.

== Publications ==
- 2007. Moods of Future Joys: Around the World by Bike – Part 1. Eye Books. ISBN 978-1-903070-56-7.
- 2007. Thunder and Sunshine: Around the World by Bike – Part 2. Eye Books. ISBN 978-1-903070-54-3
- 2009. Ten Lessons from the Road. Eye Books.
- 2011. The Boy Who Biked the World: On the Road to Africa. Eye Books.
- 2011. The Boy Who Biked the World: Part Two: Riding the Americas. Eye Books.
- 2011. The Boy Who Biked the World: Part Three: Riding Home Through Asia. Eye Books.
- 2011. There Are Other Rivers: On Foot Across India. Self Published.
- 2014. Microadventures. HarperCollins.
- 2016. Grand Adventures. HarperCollins.
- 2018. Alastair Humphreys' Great Adventurers. Big Picture Press.
- 2019. Around the World by Bike. Blink Publishing. (an audiobook compilation of Moods of Future Joys and Thunder and Sunshine)
- 2019. My Midsummer Morning: Rediscovering a Life of Adventure. HarperCollins.
- 2019. The Doorstep Mile: Live More Adventurously Every Day. Self Published.
- 2020. A Notebook for Adventures: The Doorstep Mile. Self Published.
- 2020. A Notebook for Living Adventurously: Questions and Answers. Self Published.
- 2021. Ask an Adventurer. Eye Books.
- 2022. The Girl Who Rowed the Ocean. Lightning Books.
- 2024. Local: A search for nearby nature and wilderness. Eye Books.
- 2026. Unwilded: Finding Our Way Back to Nature. Eye Books.

== See also ==
- Bicycle touring
