= Micro Adventure =

1980s book series

Micro Adventure is the title of a series of books for young adult readers, published by Scholastic, Inc. during the 1980s. Created by Eileen Buckholtz and Ruth Glick, the YA series combined adventure stories with computer activities.

The cover of the first Micro Adventure book, Space Attack

The books are noted for the inclusion of short BASIC type-in programs related to the plot of the story that the reader could type into their computers. The series also used second-person narration (rather like the Choose Your Own Adventure series, though unlike those, Micro Adventure storylines could not be influenced by the decisions of the reader).

Through the second-person narration, the reader took the part of Orion, a computer expert and agent for the Adventure Connection Team, and followed the action in the continuing struggle against ACT’s nemesis, BRUTE (Bureau of Random Unlawful Terror and Evil).

The plots generally resembled those typically found in other works of the secret agent/adventure genre, ranging from sabotage aboard a space station to android doubles of the President of the United States, but differ from other works for their different approach to twists, and a lack of oversimplification.

Most of the programs, even “shoot-em-up” games, were tailored towards novice programmers and designed to be small (none were over 2K in file size, a must given the limitations of some personal computers available at the time, such as the TI-99/4A). Instructions were included on how to "tweak" the programs to make them run on many popular home computers of the time.

As a bonus, an appendix to each book gave step-by-step analyses of each of the programs in that particular book as a method of teaching simple programming theory and construction.

In 2017, Auri Rahimzadeh created a website to read the books and enter their programs in an on-page emulator.

== List of titles ==
Micro Adventure series

- 1. Space Attack: Micro Adventure Number One by Eileen Buckholtz and Ruth Glick (1984; Scholastic, Inc.; ISBN 0-590-33165-5)
- 2. Jungle Quest: Micro Adventure Number Two by Megan Stine and H. William Stine (1984; Scholastic, Inc.; ISBN 0-590-33166-3)
- 3. Million Dollar Gamble: Micro Adventure Number Three by Chassie L. West (1984; ISBN 0-590-33167-1)
- 4. Time Trap (Micro Adventure, No 4) by Jean Favors (1984; Scholastic, Inc.; ISBN 0-590-33168-X)
- 5. Mindbenders (Micro Adventure, Vol. 5) by Ruth Glick and Eileen Buckholtz (1984; Scholastic, Inc.; ISBN 0-590-33169-8)
- 6. Robot Race (Micro Adventure, Vol. 6) by David Anthony Kraft (1984; Scholastic, Inc.; ISBN 0-590-33170-1)
- 7. Doom Stalker (Micro Adventure, No 7) by Ruth Glick and Eileen Buckholtz (1985; Scholastic, Inc.; ISBN 0-590-33382-8)
- 8. The Big Freeze (Micro Adventure, No 8) by Jean M. Favors (1985; Scholastic, Inc.; ISBN 0-590-33383-6)
- 9. Dead Ringer (Micro Adventure No 9) by Chassie West (1985; Scholastic, Inc.; ISBN 0-590-33384-4)
- 10. Spellbound (Micro Adventure, No 10) by Megan Stine and H. William Stine (1985; Scholastic, Inc.; ISBN 0-590-33385-2)

Magic Micro series

- Captain Kid and the Pirates (Magic Micro No 1) by Glick, Buckholtz (1985; Scholastic, Inc.; ISBN 0-590-33476-X)
- Superworld (Magic Micro No 2) by Steven Otfinoski (1985; Scholastic, Inc.; ISBN 0-590-33477-8)
- Wizards of Wonder (Magic Micro Adventure, No 3) by Megan Stine and H. William Stine (1984; Scholastic, Inc.; ISBN 0-590-33478-6)
- The Cats of Castle Mountain (Magic Micro, No 4) by Buckholtz, Glick (1985; Scholastic, Inc.; ISBN 0-590-33479-4)
