= Elves (Elfquest) =

Fictional characters created by Wendy and Richard Pini

The comic book series Elfquest, created by Wendy and Richard Pini, features a race of elves on the World of Two Moons, searching for their origins and place in the world.

== Origin ==
The elves are descended from a spacegoing race known as the High Ones, who were accompanied by small workers (later to evolve into trolls) and winged flitters (later to become the Preservers). One isolated group of High Ones, seeking a new world to dwell in, encountered an unknown planet with two moons inhabited by humans.

Scanning the planet from orbit, they learned of human legends which suggested that other High Ones had once visited the planet. Intending to communicate with the humans in order to learn more, the High Ones reshaped their bodies into elfin form and their spaceship into a Medieval-style palace. Just as they were about to land, the troll servants rebelled and caused the ship to jump back in time 20,000 years (as stated on the official Elfquest timeline), to an age when humans were at a Paleolithic stage of development. The primitive humans killed some of the elves and drove the rest away. The preservers followed the elves while the trolls, freed from their masters, established underground colonies.

Thus the elves were both the cause and the result of a time paradox, because the legends the High Ones had seen were about their own time-shifted descendants.

Most of the High Ones died out, and their descendants forgot their origins completely until Cutter's quest led to their rediscovery.

== Physical characteristics ==
While the Original High Ones (including the partial remnant of High Ones within Glider elves) are only a headlength shorter than humans and much slenderer, the Wolfriders and the Go-Backs tribes are between one half and one third of a human. The elves of Elfquest are broadly human in appearance, but are distinguished from humans by the following characteristics:

- Ears are the most obvious elfin characteristic. They are much bigger than human ears, and prominently pointed. Their tips are supported by prominent bony ridges on either side of the skull.
- Eyes are larger than human eyes, with slanted eyelids.
- Cheekbones are high and prominent.
- Noses are smaller and narrower.
- Hair is much finer and silkier than human hair (Wolfriders' hair is coarser than that of pure elves, due to their wolf blood).
- Facial hair: None, except in the case of male Wolfriders, who develop "face fur" - mutton chops, beards and moustaches - after living for several centuries.
- Fingers and toes: Only four digits on each hand and foot.
- Skin color: Elves generally exhibit the same range of variation as humans. The Sun Folk, adapted to desert conditions, have medium to dark brown skin. Wolfriders have adapted to cold temperate climates; they are pale pink or ruddy, but tan in hotter climates. Go-backs have a lighter complexion from living in Abode's northern mountains. Gliders - who mostly lived inside a mountain - are fair to pallid.

== Tribes ==
Subsequent to their arrival on the World of Two Moons, the elves splintered into a number of different tribes. These tribes differ considerably in culture and even physical appearance but all of them have some kind of animal that they use and that can be related to a form of tribe totem.

=== Wolfriders ===
The Wolf-riders are a hunter-gatherer society of nocturnal elves who possess wolf blood, which gives them characteristics unique from other tribes. In addition to having keener senses, they are mortal. Wolfriders live by a code of conduct called "The Way". It is based on the natural cycle of the wolf; it glorifies the wild freedom of a hunter's life, and the "now" of wolf-thought.

=== Sun Folk ===
The Sun Folk are a peaceful, largely agrarian desert-dwelling tribe whose dark skin helps protect them from the powerful sunlight of their home, a village called Sorrow's End. The Sun Folk can work soft metals, such as copper, silver, and gold. They are excellent weavers and are capable of building elaborate homes of sun-dried clay.

=== Gliders ===
The Gliders are a tall race of elves, almost all of whom possess the power of gliding. To avoid human persecution they have cloistered themselves inside the hollowed-out Blue Mountain, devoting themselves to art and contemplation. In the process they have become arrogant and decadent, none more so than the black-robed Winnowill. Because they had lived so long in claustrophobic isolation, the Gliders ceased to Recognize and therefore ceased having children. Eventually, they found themselves worshiped by a human tribe that dwelt at the foot of Blue Mountain. A race of giant hawks were bred to bear the Chosen Eight, the elfin messengers who bore gifts to the humans, received tokens and live offerings of human tribe members, and hunted for the other Gliders.

=== Go-Backs ===
The Go-Backs, as their name suggests, desire to return to the Palace, but the Palace had long been claimed by King Guttlekraw's trolls, enemies of the elves. In response, the Go-Backs have become a race of brutally barbaric warriors, constantly fighting the trolls until the war had become their "meat and milk". Their life was short and harsh, and they opted not to use magic because it made life deceptively soft. They value offspring, but believe in a warrior's early death. The Go-Backs had domesticated giant elks for use as mounts, and primarily dwell in lodges built into the mountains. Unknown to the Go-Backs, their chief Kahvi actually has long hidden Wolf-rider blood.

In the German edition, the Go-backs are called snow-elves.

=== Wave-dancers ===
The Wave-dancers are a tribe of elves who took refuge in the oceans of the World of Two Moons. Thanks to elfin flesh-shaping magic, the Wave-dancers have in some cases undergone physical alterations such as fins and fish-like tails to help them adapt to an aquatic life.

== Longevity ==
Most elves are effectively immortal unless killed in battle, or by disease or misadventure. The oldest known elf, Timmain, has lived at least 20,000 years by World of Two Moons' reckoning (the length of the elves' presence on the planet), and for countless time before her arrival on that planet. Wolfriders, however, because of their wolf blood, will eventually grow old and die - something that was forgotten during their conflict with humans because of the high mortality rate in that period. It is not known just how long a Wolfrider can live, but some have been known to survive for 3,000-3,500 years. This wolf trait can be removed by a healer, but such a profound excision of an inherent element of themselves is an option few Wolfriders find desirable. So far the only 'reverted' wolfriders are Skywise, in an act of desperation, and Windkin, who had his wolf blood removed in infancy without consent, and more recently, Moonshade, after a certain time of living in near proximity of the Palace of the High Ones, which altered her perceptions of life. Suntop (later renamed Sunstream), though of Wolfrider descent, never had wolf blood; his twin sister Ember 'called' the wolf blood to herself in the womb.

After death an elf's immortal spirit survives. Most elfin spirits journey to the Palace of the High Ones, but the descendants of Timmorn Yellow-Eyes, due to their wolf blood, can choose to remain to watch over their people. It has been stated that they are the only elves who are able to go where they wish after death, while all others are involuntarily drawn back to their ancestral home.

== Magic ==
Many elves have some magic, or psi powers. These include the following abilities, most of which are never given a name within the comic itself. Many of these are rare talents:

- Animal-bonding: The ability to develop an empathic or telepathic connection with an animal. Only Wolfriders are able to bond with wolves, and have a particularly close connection with them thanks to their wolf blood. A similar power exists among other tribes, such as the Gliders, who bond with giant birds.
  - Animal control: Teir's skills with animals go considerably further, allowing him to be considered part of any pack of animals.
- Astral projection: The ability to 'go out' and communicate with other magic-users in a bodiless psychic plane.
  - Mind-snare: The ability, possessed by strong astral projectors, to 'trap' other projectors in the astral plane, preventing their return to their bodies.
- Fire-starting: The ability to start and control fires. This ability is very rare; among the Wolfriders, the last known possessor who was able to control this magic was Zarhan Fastfire, in the time of the Wolfriders' second chief. It may have been a failed firestarting attempt by him that created the bad magic pool that spawned Madcoil. Per the novelizations, both Savah and Winnowill also have this ability, but Winnowill has never been shown using it in the comic itself. Savah has only rarely done so, as when she magically lights the lanterns for the Sun Village's annual festival.
- Freezing stare: The ability to paralyze an animal or intelligent being with a stare, a kind of hypnosis. It was introduced by Rayek in the Original Quest.
- Force shield: The power to create a magical barrier capable of holding back magical attacks or physical objects. This is most effectively demonstrated by Zhantee of the SunFolk in the Forbidden Grove when he shields Krim and Skot from a falling branch and again when he keeps the Djun's tower from crushing the others as they escaped.
- Gliding: The ability to 'fly' or self-levitate, allowing an elf to glide with the winds or with an initial kick-off. Strong gliders use the power more fully for self propulsion, at high speed and maneuverability. Tyldak of the Gliders had Winnowill reshape his body into a bat-like structure so to be able to truly fly with his own propulsion. Gliding is a very deeply innate ability - the Glider elves of Blue Mountain are shown to glide while unconscious, sleeping, or having sex. The magic-user Rayek doesn't actually glide - rather, he uses powerful telekinesis to move himself, somewhat lacking in finesse.
- Healing: The ability to heal injury or disease. Unscrupulous healers can invert the power by violently stimulating pain nerves to make the target experience agonizing pain. Conversely, the pleasure nerves can also be stimulated with equal strength, producing intensely pleasurable sensations that can dramatically enhance sexual experiences. Healers can also induce Recognition, with varying degrees of success. Go-backs stigmatize healers, believing they make warriors soft and careless. It is possible for an elf to heal a non-elf (such as a human) but this is significantly more difficult as their bodies are much less malleable.
  - Flesh-shaping: The ability, possessed by sophisticated healers, to manipulate flesh to shape it to their desires. This can be done on a large scale, such as Winnowill's reshaping of Tyldak into a birdlike being, or on a very subtle level, such as the removal of 'wolf blood' from Wolfriders.
  - Shielding: The ability to protect another from magical attack using one's own healing power.
- Levitation: The ability to telekinetically manipulate objects.
- Magic feeling: The ability to detect past and present use of other psi powers.
- Rock-shaping: The ability to sculpt and mold solid rock, but generally this power cannot affect refined metal. This ability is most notably used by the Gliders Egg and Door, as well as firstborn to the High Ones, Ekuar.
- Sending: The ability to exchange thoughts and feelings by telepathy. All elves appear to have the capacity for sending, but some tribes use it more often than others; the Wolfriders send frequently, whereas the Go-Backs send very rarely and the Sun Folk hardly at all. Wolfriders can send to their wolves (only the original wolves and their offspring, due to being descendants of Timmorn Yellow-Eyes) but the wolves communicate in images more than words.
  - Black-sending: The ability to send in such a way as to cause psychic pain. Winnowill is adept at black-sending. This attack can be blocked by a healer in physical contact with a victim to counter the induced pain.
  - Power sending: Strongbow's sending is significantly stronger than most, allowing him to reach large distances, or impose his will over weaker minds.
  - Send-shielding: The ability to block or protect against the sendings of others. Venka displayed this power at a very young age.
- Shapeshifting: The ability to assume the form of other living creatures (even humans in some cases). Experienced healers can flesh-shape themselves to (for instance) grow gills, but the process is notoriously slower.
- Tree-shaping: The ability to grow and shape plants. Especially skilled is the wolfrider Redlance.

There are also certain abilities that the elves attribute to their family bonds:

- Cutter, Leetah, and the twins (Suntop and Ember) have shown increased strength (in resisting Winnowill's attacks, and using sending to overpower her) through being together and acting as a unit (in Siege at Blue Mountain). They attributed this specifically to their being a family.
- The twins have a connection that defies any distance, and they attribute it specifically to their being twins. In what appears to be sending but might have an astral projection component, they can communicate even when on opposite sides of the planet, and Suntop has sensed Ember's emotional turmoil without any physical communication attempt on her part.

Furthermore, the knowledge of an elf's soulname gives the person who knows said soulname power over that elf, in a notably similar manner as True Names in Ursula K. Le Guin's Earthsea series. While the Wolfriders were at Blue Mountain, Winnowill was able to prevent Dewshine from leaving the mountain by using her soulname as a form of mind control. She had discovered it by spying on Tyldak, who had recently Recognized Dewshine.

The soulname is known from conception to the child's parents, and it is forgotten by all involved at birth, later revealed only to the child in a spirit quest. It is often only revealed in Recognition to the Recognized lifemate, unless the elf decides to divulge the name willingly to another, but this is rarely done; two notable occurrences are Dewshine, Tyleet and Scouter, and Nightfall and Redlance, before the fight for the palace with the Go-Backs. Generally, only Wolfriders had soulnames: according to Leetah in the first album, the Sun Folk have either forgotten how to send or do so rarely, which eliminates the need to protect the inner self with a secret name. Gliders, on the other hand, are capable senders and have no soulnames either, and Go-Backs have no soulnames as well, with Kahvi being a possible exception.

=== New Moon ===
New Moon is Cutter's curved sword, passed down to him by his father Bearclaw when he died and Cutter became chief of the Wolfriders. Forged from steel (called "bright-metal" by elves, whose metalwork knowledge is limited), its hilt comes apart to reveal a hidden key. The key's purpose, and what it unlocks, are pivotal to the outcome of the original series of Elfquest.

=== Palace of the High Ones ===
There is a familial spirit that exudes this place. Originally it was a cosmic egg, space craft that transmogrified into a Castle, a form that the human inhabitants could identify with. In the beginning of the saga, this is the hidden object of Cutter's quest, but in later series, the united elves can join in a united "sending" to lift the Palace and transport themselves throughout the cosmos.

=== Egg ===
Egg is "the pride of the Gliders", and refers both to the elf permanently fixed in a stone chair in Blue Mountain, entranced in the levitation and constantly reshaped egg (actually several eggs one inside the other). It is at once an elaborate work of art and history of the elves. Winnowill's uniquely long meditations upon the Egg (she was patient enough to watch it shaped from the first shell) allow her to conceive a plan which is the subject of the second series of Elfquest, Siege at Blue Mountain. Egg (the rock shaper, real name Aurek) is later called Father of Memory by Jink.

== Sex and relationships ==
=== Fertility ===
Because of their extreme longevity, elves have a very low birth rate. Stable and peaceful elf societies such as the Sun Folk and the Gliders have no deaths for long periods and therefore no births, while the Wolfriders and Go-Backs, plagued by centuries of war against humans and trolls respectively, have a higher birth rate in order to stabilize their populations, although still very low by human standards.

Elves also have a very long gestation period - about two years. The reason for this is not entirely clear, but it does make the eventual birth of a child an eagerly-anticipated event. Among elves the concept of an unwanted child is unthinkable.

Perhaps because of the low birth rate, and the fact that elves have no sexually transmitted diseases, sex is regarded also as a recreational rather than a reproductive activity and there are few taboos.

=== Relationships: Lovemates and lifemates ===
Elves who form casual relationships with partners of either sex are called lovemates, and it is fairly common for an elf to have more than one lovemate at a time. Although this is not like marriage, lovemates can be very close, and the loss of a lovemate can be traumatic.

Some elves choose partners, usually of the opposite sex, for life, called lifemates. This is the closest elfin equivalent to marriage, but there is no bar against one or both lifemates of a pair taking other lovemates (or even other lifemates) of either sex, as long as the other does not object. While lifemates usually share soul names, lovemates usually do not.

While elves tend to remain emotionally loyal to their lifemates, they can be free with their sexuality.

These arrangements usually run smoothly, although possessiveness and jealousy are not unknown. Freedom and independence within a relationship were key concerns for Leetah, as she struggled over whether to form a relationship with Cutter; Savah made her realize that the Wolfriders value freedom too, so Cutter was not likely to be a controlling mate. True to Savah's word, the couple's submission to the demands of Recognition eventually were replaced with a deep mutual love, to the point Leetah later told Rayek "[Cutter] was my SOUL!"

=== Recognition ===
Among the elves there is the phenomenon known as Recognition. When two elves of opposite sex having exceptionally compatible qualities for reproduction meet, they experience a sudden and immediate compulsion to mate. This leads to a child and often becoming life-mates. A Wolfrider who experiences Recognition involuntarily surrenders his or her soul name to the other recognized elf. This is described by the phrase, "soul meets soul when eyes meet eyes".

Recognition is a purely involuntary urge that has no regard for pre-existing relationships. This can cause considerable tension between one or both of those experiencing it and their established partners; while Recognition does not dictate the formation of a lasting relationship, it is very common. This is likely due to the two elves involved knowing the other's soulname, removing all barriers to essentially knowing everything about the person. Generally, even if a longer relationship does not develop, a new-found level of respect is formed. Some elves have tried to resist Recognition, but this only causes them to experience increasing physical and mental distress. Richard Pini has stated that unconsummated Recognition is never fatal.

Emotional reactions to Recognition have varied widely with different characters. For instance, Leetah's parents were close for some time before they Recognized, and they immediately complied with the biological imperative without any argument. By contrast, Leetah attempted to resist her Recognition with Cutter, but the combination of Cutter's patience with her reticence, her growing appreciation for Wolfrider culture, and her elder's counsel on the matter convinced her to cooperate, until Recognition faded favor of a strong love. On the other hand, Dewshine and Tyldak of the Gliders were mutually resistant until they were convinced to fulfill the physical requirements before agreeing to go their separate ways. When Dewshine's lifemate, Scouter, recognized Tyleet, Dewshine was delighted at this development, and in turn they formed a triad.

The purpose of Recognition is to produce healthy offspring that have their beneficial inherited characteristics maximized. Whatever emotional upheavals it may cause, all elves agree that children conceived in Recognition have greater physical, mental and magical gifts than those who are not. For example, the children of the recognized lifemates, Cutter and Leetah, Suntop and Ember have considerable magical potential and physical hardiness respectively. A gifted offspring resulting from non-Recognized parents do occur; one example is Kahvi and Rayek's magically endowed daughter Venka.

Recognition can have direct consequences for the affected adults. For instance, Dewshine and Tyldak's perception of each other is directly influenced by the effect; Dewshine sees Tyldak in his normal form before Winnowil altered his body into a bird-like structure while Tyldak sees her as a half-animal with fur and a vaguely lupine face. Another example is the Recognized union of Woodlock and Rainsong, notably prolific as far as elves go.

Probably the strangest noted "Recognition", confirmed by Wendy and Richard Pini from Wolfrider! The Newer edition is between Skywise and Cutter. After a daunting year of Cutter being forced to be the trolls' slave, Skywise bought his freedom, causing great anger to Cutter (who wanted to gain the trolls' respect), and the tension thus caused the two of them to discover the other's soulname whilst fighting. The two have determined they are "brothers in all but blood" since then, even experiencing the other's pain in times of duress.

=== The Go-Backs' Orgy ===
Among the Go-backs one further form of sexual relationship exists: the orgy. In Go-back society both sexes fight in wars. Thus the night before a battle is usually marked by frenzied dancing followed by group sexual activity. This is partly in order to celebrate life before risking it in battle, and partly to scatter seed as widely as possible so that those females who survive will replenish the tribe. In addition, the founder of this tribe favored quantity over quality in reproduction and thus Recognition's influence was significantly reduced to allow for more frequent conceptions.
