= The ElfQuest Boardgame =

The ElfQuest Boardgame is a 1986 board game published by Mayfair Games.

== Gameplay ==
The ElfQuest Boardgame is a game in which a game adapted from the Elfquest comic series offers is designed for two to five players, and centers on elf tribes racing to locate their birthplace, Elf Home, while contending with event cards and iconic characters like Cutter, Skywise, and Winnowill, who can either aid or obstruct them. King Guttlekraw's trolls are controlled by one player who actively disrupts elf progress. Trolls have hidden strength counters and access to troll tunnels, giving them strategic mobility and combat advantages. The game board is built from tiles laid during play, with the troll player able to manipulate terrain by playing tiles from any player's hand, often to block Elf Home's discovery. Only one of five Elf Home tiles is genuine, and elves must deduce its location by visiting clue tiles. Meanwhile, the troll gains morale through combat, which can be spent to construct a dome over Elf Home—securing victory if completed before the elves uncover its true location. Gameplay focuses on elves competing to find Elf Home while cooperating to fend off the troll.

== Reception ==
Ian Marsh reviewed The Elfquest Boardgame for Adventurer magazine and stated that "No one player has a crushing advantage over the others, so gamers who enjoy balanced games should take to Elfquest. Gamers who are fans of the comic will also enjoy the game for its portrayal of the quest. And Elfquest haters may well simply enjoy the game because it allows them to smash cute elves to bits."
