= Elfquest =

Comic book series by Wendy and Richard Pini

- Elfquest #5, 1979, cover art by Wendy Pini.

Publication information
- Publisher: WaRP Graphics (1978–2003); Marvel Comics (1985–1988); DC Comics (2003–2006); Dark Horse Comics (2013–present)
- Publication date: 1978 – present

Creative team
- Created by: Wendy and Richard Pini
- Written by: Wendy and Richard Pini; Various others
- Artist(s): Wendy Pini; Various others

Collected editions
- Elfquest Archives vol. 1: ISBN 1401201288
- Elfquest Archives vol. 2: ISBN 1401201296
- Elfquest Archives vol. 3: ISBN 1401204120
- Elfquest Archives vol. 4: ISBN 1401207731

Elfquest (or ElfQuest) is a comic book property created by Wendy and Richard Pini in 1978, and still owned by them. It is a fantasy story about a community of elves and other fictional species who struggle to survive and coexist on a primitive Earth-like planet with two moons. Several published volumes of prose fiction also share the same setting. Elfquest was one of the first comic book series to have a planned conclusion. Over the years Elfquest has been self-published by the Pinis through their own company Warp Graphics, then Marvel Comics, then the Pinis again, more recently DC Comics, and, since 2013, Dark Horse Comics. All issues of Elfquest published prior to 2014 are available online for free.

== Publication history ==
The first Elfquest story, "Fire and Flight", appeared in February 1978 in the underground comic book Fantasy Quarterly, published by Lansing, Michigan-based IPS (Independent Publishers Syndicate). That company closed after publishing the first issue of Elfquest. Sandwiched between the two parts of the Elfquest story was a brief story written by T. Casey Brennan and illustrated by Cerebus the Aardvark creator Dave Sim titled "Doorway to the Gods". The quality of the publication was disappointing to Wendy and Richard Pini. The interior was printed on newsprint, and the cover was printed, in a limited color palette, on only slightly heavier, uncoated paper stock.

=== WaRP Graphics ===
The poor quality of this publication convinced the Pinis that they could produce a higher quality publication on their own. After borrowing money in order to start WaRP Graphics, the Pinis started publishing with Elfquest #2. It was printed magazine-size with glossy full-color covers and a character portrait print on the back cover by Wendy, a format that continued throughout the series' entire run. This story continued the Elfquest tale started in Fantasy Quarterly. Later, the Pinis' company WaRP Graphics reprinted the story from Fantasy Quarterly as Elfquest #1 with a new front cover and full-color portrait print for the rear cover.

This series was one of the early successes that marked the establishment of a phase in underground comics in which a new genre of alternative independent comic books emerged that were closer in content to mainstream comics. Elfquest was also one of the first comic book series that had a prearranged conclusion. It was highly praised for its innovative themes. The fact that a female artist/writer (Wendy Pini) was the creative principal of the series was also notable.

The original series – generally referred to as "The Original Quest" or "OQ" – ran for 20 magazine-size issues (spanning about seven to eight years in terms of the main storyline), released three times a year. Color compilations followed, published by the Donning Company under its Starblaze imprint as Books 1-4. Two more series were published in a reduced comic book-size format, but still in black and white: Siege at Blue Mountain (8 issues) and Kings of the Broken Wheel (9 issues), later collected and published in color by Warp Graphics under its Father Tree Press imprint as part of a second edition of the graphic novels as Books 5-8. The stories take place three years after the original quest.

=== Warp Graphics explosion and implosion ===
In the 1990s, the Pinis rebranded slightly (WaRP became Warp) and then began to publish multiple titles concurrently, many with overlapping storylines, showcasing the work of new artists and writers on the series. The (initially) color titles New Blood, Hidden Years, and Shards for the most part carried the main storyline forward from the prehistoric to the medieval period of the World of Two Moons (now named Abode), occasionally featuring non-canonical stories. The historical background of the Wolfriders was filled out in Blood of Ten Chiefs, Two-Spear, and Kahvi. The future of Abode was explored in The Rebels and Jink, set at a time when humans have reached space and colonized other worlds and the elves have all but disappeared. A fifth tribe of elves, the WaveDancers, was introduced only to be redacted from continuity. A one-shot issue re-introduced the sea elves with a new cast of characters. The first ten issues of Hidden Years were collected in two color volumes, Hidden Years and Rogue's Challenge (Book 9 in the continuity of the second edition of graphic novels). Selected stories from the first ten issues of New Blood were collected as New Blood and Bedtime stories. Towards the end of their runs, in the mid-1990s, most of these titles reverted to black and white in North America, though some were published in color in Europe.

In large part as a response to the shrinking direct market in the mid-1990s, continuing storylines were collapsed together into a single 64-page anthology series introduced by the one-shot Metamorphosis. The new series was simply titled Elfquest (Volume 2), and ran for 33 issues.

=== Other media ===
The series has also served as the basis for three novelizations (Journey to Sorrow's End, The Quest Begins, and Captives of Blue Mountain) and five Blood of Ten Chiefs short story anthologies (some of which served as the basis of scripts in Blood of Ten Chiefs comic book series). The music CD A Wolfrider's Reflections is an album of folk songs based on elements from the original quest. Several collectibles, calendars, apparel, a role-playing game, and figurines have been sold over the years. The full-length novel ElfQuest: Journey to Sorrows End, which included both text and several black-and-white illustrated plates, was published in Playboy in 1982, and by Berkley in March 1984.

=== Marvel ===
In 1985, the original series was republished by Marvel Comics' Epic imprint in 32 installments. Distributed on newsstands, this gave the series much-desired mass-market exposure. Because of Marvel's 22-page format, these new editions featured additional bridging pages which broke the narrative at different points than in the original Warp comics, which contained 32 pages of story. Marvel's license was only for the original series, which was already completed, so none of the sequels followed suit. Most of the additional material (bridging pages and panels) was incorporated into subsequent print collections and the online edition.

=== DC Comics ===
Elfquest: Wolfrider #1, 2003.

In March 2003, after 25 years of self-publication, the Pinis licensed all publishing and merchandising rights in the series to DC Comics, although the Pinis retained ownership and creative control.

DC's publication of Elfquest material began in July 2003 with The Elfquest 25th Anniversary Special, reprinting the first issue of Elfquest with new computer coloring and lettering by Wendy Pini and two short interviews with the Pinis. This was a teaser for The Elfquest Archives, hardcover color compilation volumes which were released beginning in November. This series planned to reprint the first eight graphic novel collections in glossy format with new coloring and lettering. Fans complained that the publication schedule was disappointingly slow. Volume 2 was originally scheduled to appear in fall 2004 but after some delays was finally released in March 2005, 16 months after Volume 1. Part of the reason for the delay is that Wendy Pini was undergoing hip replacement surgery.

Meanwhile, September 2003 saw the publication of Elfquest: Wolfrider Volume 1, beginning a series of bimonthly manga-sized black-and-white reprint collections which arrange the story into chronological order for the first time, beginning around 600 years before the events in the original series. Wolfrider Volume 2 is followed chronologically by Elfquest: The Grand Quest Volume 1, the first in a series reprinting the original storyline, including the additional art drawn for the Marvel version. In this series, the original artwork has been rearranged into new panel layouts for clarity in the physically smaller manga format, which sometimes involved Wendy Pini adding extensions to the original artwork. Some sections of the original artwork are not included, for example in ElfQuest: The Grand Quest Volume 11, a standalone story involving Tyleet and her adopted human son Little Patch is not in the volume, though later in Volume 13 Tyleet mentions Little Patch constantly while discussing the dream she had while encased for 10,000 years by the Preservers.

Another book, Elfquest: The Searcher and the Sword, was published in July 2004. Critical reaction was generally favorable; the major criticism leveled at the book is that it is overpriced for its size (96 pages).

After the four-issue comic series Elfquest: Discovery, published in 2006, no more new stories appeared until the Final Quest, beginning in 2012.

=== Online release ===
In March 2008, Warp Graphics began uploading previously published stories to elfquest.com. They intended to make the entire series available online over the course of 2008, but the issues proved too numerous to upload within the year. Uploading of all comics was completed in March 2009.

In September 2012, the latest series' Final Quest prologue story began publication at a rate of one page per week at Boing Boing. Only about half of the prologue appeared there, deliberately, as a teaser leading to the print and digital publication planned for 2013 by Dark Horse Comics.

=== Final Quest ===
In October 2013, Elfquest Special: The Final Quest was published as a one-shot by Dark Horse Comics. It included the material originally seen at Boing Boing plus the rest of the Final Quest prologue. The Final Quest series began publication by Dark Horse Comics, with the first issue released on January 22, 2014. The entire Final Quest series ran for 24 issues. The final issue, #24, was released on February 28, 2018, exactly 40 years after issue #1 of the Original Quest was first released.

=== Stargazer's Hunt ===
In November 2019, a new series debuted from Dark Horse Comics. Titled Elfquest: Stargazer's Hunt, the story focuses on Skywise.

== Background and setting ==
The world in which the series takes place – eventually called Abode by its human inhabitants, but originally referred to as the World of Two Moons – superficially resembles Earth, with geography that is marginally similar. There are some unusual prehistoric survivals among the fauna, and in early storylines Abode could have been described as Earth with two moons, hence its original name. As the story moves forward and Abode's history develops, it becomes apparent that its human culture and technology is distinguished by the twenty thousand years of influence by the elves, who have left an indelible mark on human society (though their existence is unacknowledged and unofficially suppressed by Abode's world government).

The elves of Elfquest are descended from highly advanced humanoid aliens called High Ones by their descendants. When their homeworld's natural resources became depleted due to overpopulation, they went spacefaring in order to find new planets to settle. Some of them returned to their dead homeworld, and ended up awakening their immense psycho-kinetic psychic powers and biological immortality. They eventually resumed spacefaring to explore the wider universe, using telekinesis to create egg-shaped vessels and pilot them to new worlds, adapting to any ecosystem by shifting their own shapes and metabolisms. As companions, they brought two of the last surviving animal species from their home, both of which gradually evolved during the journey (and subsequent events) into two more races of sapient near-immortals: the insectoid Preservers and the simian-descended Trolls.

After journeying to many different worlds, one of these vessels came to Abode (known to its inhabitants as the World of Two Moons), where human civilization had reached a level that was almost identical to Europe's medieval period on Earth. Observing the humans, the High Ones saw the humans' artwork and literature depicted angels, deities, spirits and other ethereal beings which suggested to the High Ones that others of their kind had previously visited that world. In order to facilitate contact with the humans, before landing on the world, the High Ones deliberately formed themselves like elves and reshaped their egg-vessel to resemble a beautiful floating castle that matched the native architectural idiom, so that they could stay long enough to seek out more information about the previous visitors. The palace itself consists of two main parts: the magical material of which it is made, and two magic scrolls that contain all the history of the High Ones. The palace is also where the souls of dead elves come together to spend the rest of their existence.

Also by this time, the evolved simians (proto-Trolls) had become resentful of their subservient status and wished to permanently remain on the world. As the High Ones began to make the 'castle' descend, the simians violently rebelled, disrupting the High Ones' telekinetic controls enough to hurl the entire vessel and its contents back through time to Abode's paleolithic era. Staggering out from the crash-landing, the High Ones found that their psychic powers were greatly weakened on Abode, leaving many of them unable to defend themselves from the prehistoric cave-dwelling humans who fearfully attacked them. Forcibly dispersed away from the massacre outside of the palace-shaped vessel, many of the initial elf survivors soon died, unable to adapt to the new, hostile environment; the others gradually gathered into several widely scattered tribes. The known tribes include (in order of introduction) the Wolfriders (forest-dwelling hunter-gatherers), Sun Folk (desert-dwelling farmers), Gliders (mountain-dwellers, only a few of whom hunt), Go-backs (formerly hunters, now primarily reindeer herders), and the Wavedancers (sea-dwelling hunter-gatherers). The High Ones' evolved-simian servants also fled, mainly into networks of caverns where they became larger and established themselves as the subterranean race of Trolls, treasure-seeking miners and metalsmiths whose original links to the High Ones were forgotten.

The main story begins 10,000 years later, with elves and other beings having adapted with great difficulty to their home. Each tribe of elves has its own set of adaptations and traditions, and most of them are unaware that any of the other tribes even exist.

== Cast ==
=== The Wolfriders ===
The central characters are the Wolfrider elves, a tribe of ferocious hunter/warriors closely allied with wolves who serve as mounts, hunting partners, and friends. Their culture is roughly analogous to the Iroquois Native American nation. Within their founder group, a female High One named Timmain had been the only member to retain her shape-shifting ability. When winter came, Timmain shape-shifted into a wolf to hunt food for the starving elves around her. She sank deeply into her wolf-form and eventually forgot her original identity, even mating with a native wolf to produce a half-wolf chimeric son whom she handed over to the Elves after teaching him as much as she could as a wolf. They gave him the name Timmorn Yellow-Eyes and he became the first Chief of the Wolfriders, bringing the wolf pack and the stranded elves together to form a close symbiotic alliance. Because of his mixed blood, Timmorn was mortal, unlike his progenitors. Timmorn then went on to sire many children, with both wolves and elves; as a result, the entire tribe and their bonded wolf pack can all trace their bloodline back to Timmorn in some way by the point at which the series begins. This mingling of wolf and elf blood produces unexpected results; aside from maintaining a feral, wolf-like mentality (known as the Way), the Wolfriders are the only elves who can, eventually, die of old age. In addition to the close bonds with their wolves, the Wolfriders also have some basic psychic powers like telepathy (known as "sending"), healing, and plant manipulation. Because of the hybridization, their wolves also possess powers of telepathy, allowing Wolfriders to "send" with their wolves.

The central storyline, beginning with the series known as the Grand Quest or Original Quest, focuses on the tribe during the leadership of their eleventh chief Cutter. At the start of the story, the Wolfriders' regular forest life – intermittently interspersed by conflict with superstitiously genocidal humans – is lost when the humans set fire to the forest in retaliation for a previous battle.

The Wolfriders seek refuge in the caverns of their sullen, greedy, cowardly trade partners, the trolls. The elves claim that the trolls owe them sanctuary because of all the ways the Wolfriders have helped them over the years, but the corrupt troll king, Greymung, feels humiliated for being held at knifepoint by an elf and plots revenge. The elves are taken down a long tunnel toward what the trolls claim will be a land of bright promise, but is actually a trackless desert. Then their guide seals the tunnel behind them. Desperately inspired by a piece of "magic" lodestone they obtained from the trolls' caves that acts as a crude compass, they make an arduous journey across the wasteland until they encounter an oasis called Sorrow's End, populated by a tribe of sedentary, agrarian elves called the Sun Folk.

=== The Sun Folk ===
Compared to the Wolfriders, the peaceful Sun Folk have retained more knowledge about the High Ones. In turn, there are some psychic phenomena which have remained more common among the Wolfriders than among the Sun Folk, such as sending and "Recognition", a powerful involuntary compulsion to mate with another elf; this mating is guaranteed to produce offspring who are more powerful than either parent. This powerful impulse can be resisted with difficulty, but at the cost of great personal stress. If the two individuals are not temperamentally compatible, they may part ways again as soon as a child has been produced, but otherwise they may form a lifelong pair-bond as "lifemates".

Cutter's partner in Recognition is the Sun Folk's beautiful and powerful healer, Leetah. She initially rejects him as a savage barbarian, especially since she is already partnered to her village's haughty chief hunter, Rayek. The love triangle between Cutter, Leetah, and Rayek is the main focus of much of the first part of the story. Cutter and Leetah eventually become lifemates; bested by Cutter in a ritual trial and displaced as sole hunter and protector by the Wolfriders, Rayek leaves the village.

Once this conflict is resolved, the two tribes quickly unite with each side willing to adjust to the other for their mutual benefit. The Wolfriders enjoy the benefits of a more sophisticated culture with greater knowledge, while the Sun Folk benefit from a band of strong hunters and defenders of their desert refuge from humanity.

Six years later, the oasis sanctuary of Sorrow's End is breached by a handful of starving humans who approach the oasis. Although they are sent on their way (probably to die of thirst), Cutter realizes that more could follow and decides to take action. He goes on a quest with his soul-brother, Skywise, seeking other elf tribes as allies against humanity. Later, Cutter's son, Suntop, receives a warning from the Sun Folk's elder Savah, The Mother of Memory, about an evil which Cutter must avoid. Savah, who is close to being a High One herself, possesses a magical ability known as "going out", where her spirit leaves her body in attempts to connect to other Elves. In this way she was also able to briefly contact Rayek after he left Sorrow's End. The majority of the Wolfriders escort Leetah, Suntop, and his twin sister Ember on their journey to deliver Savah's warning to Cutter and Skywise.

=== The Gliders ===
Continuing their quest, Cutter and Skywise learn of the existence of another elf tribe dwelling in a place called Blue Mountain. This previously unknown tribe, consisting of tall, thin, graceful elves, is known as the Gliders. They treated humans like any other prey, until a human shaman made her way near the peak of Blue Mountain and sang and talked to them. The Gliders then agreed not to hunt humans, if they in turn received offerings and worship. The humans then worshiped them as "spirit-gods".

The Gliders claim to be original High Ones and are nominally led by an ancient elf named Lord Voll. He wanted them to have a safe home, thus their rockshapers built a home inside Blue Mountain after the memories of the Palace of the High Ones. After Lord Voll's lover and confidant Winnowill created the Chosen Eight, a group of hunters that rode the Giant Hawks that nested in Blue Mountain – no one but those hunters left the mountain. They are a conservative community that has degenerated into insular decadence, dominated by the seductive, sinister Winnowill, who was once Voll's consort but who now has her own agenda.

Cut off from new impulses, the Gliders' culture turned in on itself. They created intricate art, such as the Egg of Six Spheres, which recorded the elves' history, but stopped growing. For millennia no children were born. Some of the rockshapers were put into permanent trance, and do nothing but fulfill a certain function. Winnowill manipulated Voll so that his plans to leave Blue Mountain again never grew to fruition. Lord Voll came to believe that the elves were doomed to wither, and that there would never be any children born. Only the arrival of the Wolfriders with their children and the Preservers could wake him up. He was then determined to return to the Palace of the High Ones as soon as possible, but was killed before reaching it, leaving Winnowill as new Lord of the Gliders.

The Gliders rarely venture out of their mountain except for the Chosen Eight, the tribe's hunters and (if need be) warriors. Although they have their own powers of psychic levitation, the Eight ride massive birds with whom they share a strong bond, similar to that of the Wolfriders and their wolves. As the Wolfriders search for Cutter and Skywise, Strongbow shoots down one of the massive birds for food. Enraged at the death of their mount, the Gliders attack the Wolfriders and imprison most of the tribe within Blue Mountain. Winnowill then tortures Strongbow for the death of the bird, while Leetah, Ember, and Suntop hide in the Forbidden Grove which is the home of the Preservers. Nightfall and Redlance also manage to escape imprisonment, and stumble upon Cutter and Skywise shortly after Cutter and his family are re-united. One-Eye, also not captured, lurks around the base of the mountain surviving on the humans' unknown generosity.

Dewshine, much to the dismay of her tribe (and herself), becomes Recognized by one of the Gliders named Tyldak, who has been reshaped by Winnowill to resemble a bird himself. Both fight the Recognition at first, but eventually give in and Dewshine becomes pregnant.

Winnowill puts all Gliders but the Chosen Eight into deep sleep, and attempts to use their magic powers to shape Blue Mountain into a vessel to leave the World of Two Moons. This plan is foiled by the Wolfriders. The already re-shaped Blue Mountain shatters, and nearly all Gliders are killed; as a people and a tribe, the Gliders no longer exist.

=== The Go-Backs ===
The Go-Backs are the fourth and last Elf tribe encountered during the Original Quest. Originally a migrating tribe, the Go-Backs are named after a sudden desire to "go back" to the Palace of the High Ones. The Palace has a strong pull on all elves once in range, and the Go-Backs were the first to stumble on it since the High Ones were driven away. First appearing to save Cutter and his followers from a war party of trolls in a snow-bound tundra, the Go-Backs are arctic-dwelling elk-herders, bearing about the same resemblance to the Sámi as the Wolfriders do to the Iroquois and the Sun Folk to Mesoamericans (that is to say, mainly in costume). They are highly warlike and hardened, being locked in continual strife with the trolls who bar their way to the Palace. They have a prejudice against magic, but not to the extent of persecuting its users. The Go-Backs, so removed from magic, no longer rely on Recognition to procreate. They provided the bulk of the military strength that allowed the completion of the first quest, and lost half their numbers in doing so.

=== The High Ones ===
The High Ones were an advanced race, resembling the aliens known as Greys; they were stranded on Abode after their ship, the Palace, was sabotaged from within and crash-landed. There are few, if any, known High Ones remaining on Abode, though they live on in their descendants, the Elves, Trolls, and Preservers.

== Contributing artists and writers ==
Various artists and writers have contributed to Elfquest over the years, including the following, as listed on the Elfquest Reader's Collection page.

=== Artists ===
Wendy Pini, Sonny Strait, Carol Lyon, Delfin Barral, Brandon McKinney, Barry Blair, Jerry Braccia, Jeff Zugale, Janine Johnston, Paul Bonanno, Ken Hooper, Steve Blevins, Craig Taillefer, Barb Kaalberg, Charles Barnett, Daniel Shelton, Mat Nastos, Bill Neville, Al Nickerson, Jen Marrus, Rick Ketcham, Paul Abrams, John Byrne, Terry Beatty, O.F. Roko, Lorraine Reyes, Justin Bloomer, David Boller, Dennis Fujitake, Kathryn Bolinger, Colin Chan, Wendi Strang-Frost, Carla Speed McNeil, Chris Schenk.

=== Writers ===
Wendy & Richard Pini, Sonny Strait, Brandon McKinney, Bern Harkins, Christy Marx, Andy Mangels, Terry Collins, Joellyn Auklandus, Kim Yale, Sara Byam, Wendi Lee, John Ostrander, Barry Blair, Vickie Murphy, Kathryn Bolinger, Christopher Lane, Pam Fremon, Bill Neville, Carla Speed McNeil.

== Adaptations ==
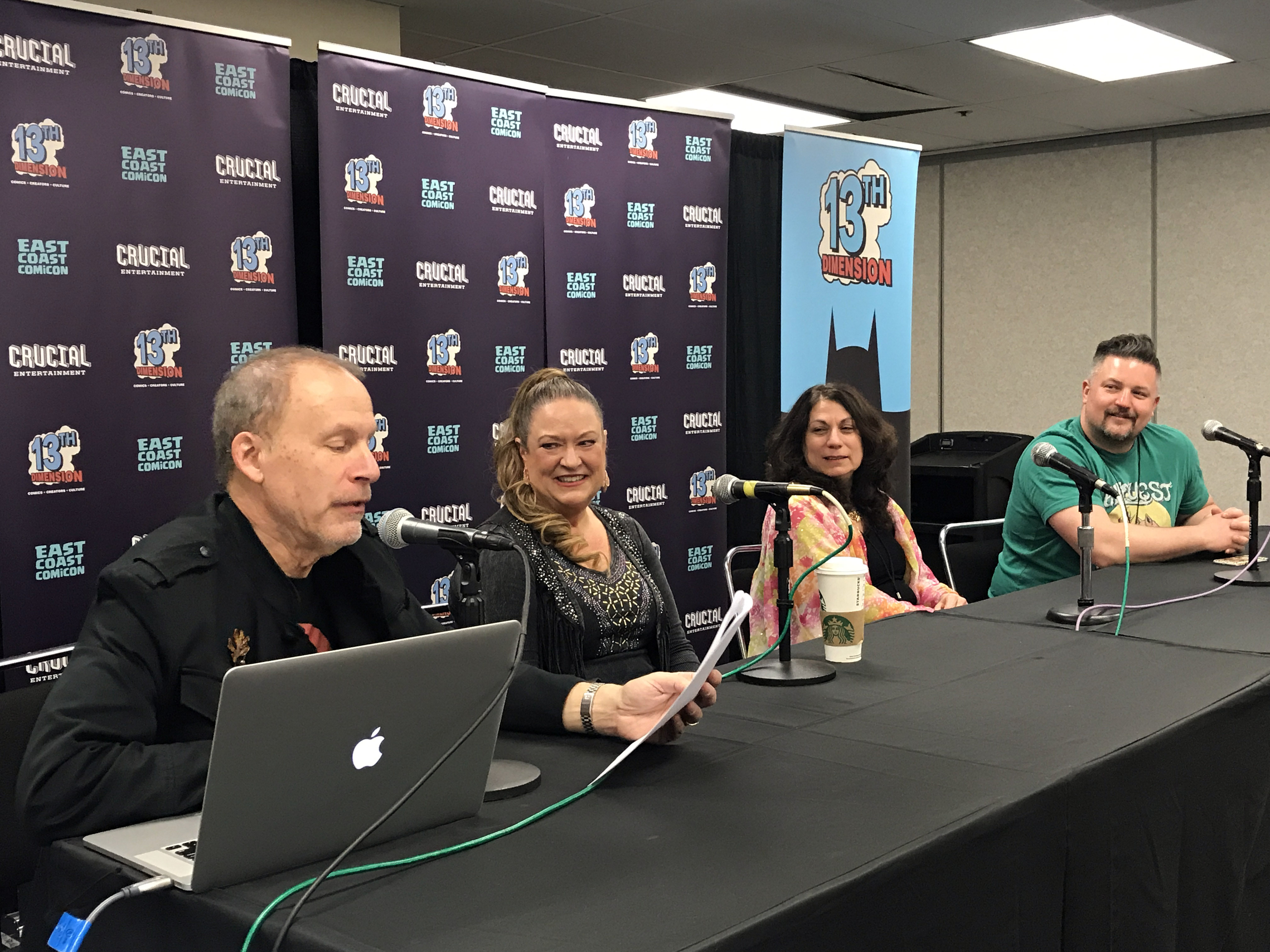
Elquest panel discussion at the 2018 East Coast Comicon in New Jersey. From left to right: Richard Pini, Wendy Pini, writer Joellyn Auklandus, and Elfquest podcaster David Mizejewski.

Besides an unofficial homage in Marvel's X-Men #153 (Kitty Pryde wears an Elfquest T-shirt throughout the issue, and a sprite named "Pini" appears on p.16), Elfquest has been adapted into a range of media. A scene from Elfquest between Cutter and Leetah in Sun Village was also performed as part of a theater rehearsal in Fantastic Four #242.

While not an adaptation in the strictest sense of the term, Piers Anthony's 13th Xanth novel Isle of View introduces a character named Jenny Elf, a Wolfrider who was magically brought to Xanth from Abode after a tragic accident. Jenny Elf, by the author's own admission, is a tribute to a young girl who was paralyzed by a drunk driver. Jenny Elf continues to be a character in subsequent Xanth novels. Warp Graphics published the first volume of a graphic novel adaptation of Isle of View entitled Return to Centaur.

=== Film ===
In 1982, the Pinis were in talks with Nelvana to produce an animated film based on the story, which was contemplated to open after issue #20's anticipated release in late 1984. While described as being in the "very early planning stages", nothing further was ever mentioned about this project.

The Pinis signed a development deal with film producer Edward Pressman in 1994, with Jeremiah Chechik planned as the director.

In 2008, Warner Bros. considered to adapt Elfquest saga to the big screen, with Rawson Thurber serving as writer and director. The format (live action, CGI, or traditional animation) is unknown. Elfquest's official Facebook page later confirmed that Warner Bros. ultimately said "no"; the ostensible reason was that Warner Bros. did not want the film to compete with their film The Hobbit. In 2013 there were rumors of recapping the project on behalf of the producers of a fanmade trailer which appeared a few years prior.

=== Animated video series ===
In the early 1990s, an ad for a multi-volume animated adaptation of Elfquest appeared in the comic. A few issues later, the Pinis told readers they'd withdrawn from the deal, and that readers should ask for refunds. Those who did not eventually received a 50-minute VHS tape from Abby Lou Entertainment, copyrighted from 1992. Covering the first volume of the book, it consists of color still images taken straight from the comic, some minor animation, and spoken dialogue. It featured the voices of Brian Cummings, Cam Clarke, Will Ryan, Jack Angel, Kath Soucie, and Mary Kay Bergman. The animated video is available for free on the official ElfQuest website.

=== Web trailer ===
Stephanie Thorpe and Paula Rhodes produced a short web trailer entitled Elfquest: A Fan Imagining. The Pinis donated original art for the fundraising campaign, and lent an original dress to the production. The short premiered at the Screen Actors Guild in April 2011 and the cast featured Taryn Southern, Casey McKinnon, Jessica Lee Rose, and more.

=== Role-playing games ===
A licensed tabletop Elfquest role playing game was produced by Chaosium in 1984, utilizing the Basic Role-Playing system which had first appeared in the game RuneQuest and some original illustrations by Wendy Pini, including the character sheets.

Both the role-playing game and the comics themselves have inspired a number of online games (mostly MUSHes).

=== Toys ===
A line of action figures was briefly produced, featuring Cutter, Leetah (with a small Petalwing figurine), Picknose, and Tyldak. A proposed second series that would have included Skywise, among others, never reached production.

=== Board games ===
Two board games featuring the Elfquest world have been published.

In 1986, Mayfair Games released ElfQuest, a competitive game where players lay tiles to build the board as the game proceeds. Players play one of four elf tribes as they try to find the elf homeland, or as the troll tribe that tries to prevent the elf players from finding the homeland long enough until they can "build a dome" over it.

In 2015, Cheeky Dingo games released the ElfQuest Adventure Game, a cooperative board game, where the players take four elven characters on a campaign of adventures based on stories from the comic books. The game was funded via Kickstarter.

=== Music ===
In 1987, Off Centaur Publications released A Wolfrider's Reflections: Songs of Elfquest, a collection of filk songs. In 2013, several unreleased Elfquest songs by Julia Ecklar were also included on her solo album, Horsetamer.

=== Starfire ===
One particular anecdote was the creation of a mission insignia for one of the experiments taken aloft by Space Shuttle Columbia with mission STS-87, which was dubbed 'Enclosed Laminar Flames', abbreviated to ELF, in 1997. As the Elfquest series was quite popular in those days, Dennis Stoker, who sponsored and managed the experiment and a huge fan of the series, asked Wendy Pini to contribute to the experiment in designing an insignia. The result is a circular insignia depicting the experiment, holding the names of the primary contributors (including the University of Iowa), set against a dark blue, star-spangled background and a unique elven character, wearing a green-and-black suit with star motifs accompanying the experiment. The character, dubbed "Starfire", became a first in space – no comic book-style character had been created in connection with a spaceflight mission, let alone actually traveled to space. Wendy Pini was particularly proud of this work.

=== ElfQuest: The Audio Movie ===
In 2021, the Pinis began to develop an audio movie production via live stream focusing on the first five issues of the original comic book series. The full-cast audio drama was developed with Dagaz Media and The Fantasy Network (TFN), using crowdfunding that allowed fans to directly support Pinis where they were able to maintain their independent voice and vision for the project without corporate changes.

Two crowdfunding pledge campaigns, one with TFN and the other through Kickstarter, were both successful, raising over $300,000. Pre-production commenced that June. Over 40 cast members were attached, including: Alejandro Saab as Cutter, Cree Summer as Savah, Amber Benson as Nightfall, Osric Chau as Skywise, Zehra Fazal as Moonshade, Hugo Pierre Martin as Redlance, Will Friedle as Strongbow, Divinity Roxx as Leetah, Pun Bandhu as Rayek, Robert Picardo as Picknose, Aaron Douglas as Treestump, Clare Kramer as Clearbrook and Rainsong, Jonathan M. Woodward as One-Eye and Woodlock, Nicole Maines as Dewshine, Thomas Trinh as Scouter, Ray Porter as Spirit Man and King Greymung, Yasha Jackson as Shenshen, Tim Russ as Sun Toucher, Abie Ekenezar as Ahdri, Jeffrey Vincent Parise as Bearclaw, Lisa Coronado as Joyleaf, and David Mizejewski as Rain. Series creator Wendy Pini appeared as a background character commonly referred to as "the Baker".

=== Cancelled adult animated series ===
In 2024, Fox Entertainment and Bento Box Entertainment developed a pilot script commitment for a one-hour adult animated series based on the comics.

On April 17, 2026, it was reported that the show will not move forward at Fox and plans had been cancelled.

== Awards and honors ==
- 1979 Ed Aprill Award (New York Comic Art Convention) – Best Independent Comic
- 1979, 1980 Alley Award
- 1980 Small Press Writers and Artists Organization – Best Artist (Comics), Wendy Pini – Best Editor (Comics), Richard and Wendy Pini
- 1981 Phantasy Press Comic Art Awards (Woody Awards, in honor of Wally Wood) – Best Alternative Comic
- 1983 Small Press Writers and Artists Organization – Best Comic
- 1983 Heroes Award (Heroes Aren't Hard To Find) – Best Black and White Magazine
- 1984 New York State Jaycees Distinguished Service Award (Wendy and Richard Pini)
- 1985 Balrog Award (Sword and Shield Corp. of Denver, Colorado) – Best Artist (Wendy Pini)
- 1986 Fantasy Festival Comic Book Awards (El Paso Fantasy Festival) – Best Alternative Comic
- 1987, 1988 Skywise (Elfquest character) inducted into Massachusetts Institute of Technology freshman class
- 1989 Golden Pen Award (Young Adult Advisory Committee, Spokane, Washington)
- 2019 Will Eisner Hall of Fame
- 2025 Inducted into the Harvey Awards Hall of Fame at New York Comic Con
