= List of Elfquest characters =

This is a list of characters in Elfquest, the science fiction/fantasy comic book series created in 1978 by Wendy and Richard Pini.

The initial list is derived from the original series, which Warp Graphics published in 1978–1984. Later series introduced numerous additional characters; about 650 have been mentioned by name at least once.

== Wolfrider Elves ==
- Bearclaw (male; soulname: Grenn): Son of Mantricker and Thornflower, possible half-brother of Moonshade, lifemate of Joyleaf, father of Cutter, grandfather of Suntop (Sunstream), Ember, and Goldruff, adoptive grandfather of Shuna, great-grandfather of Korafay. Tenth chief of the Wolfriders, Bearclaw took risks, lived in "the now", and provoked humans for amusement. He had brown hair, grey eyes, a beard and thin moustache. He was known for rowdiness, gambling with trolls, and a fine taste for dreamberry wine. He also was fiercely protective of his tribe. Bearclaw was killed by the monster Madcoil after mortally wounding it. At the end of his life, Bearclaw's wolf friend was Blackfell, after the death of his wolf Snapper. Other known wolf-friends include Crest, who knew Bearclaw's soul name, and Snapper, who died of poisoning.
- Buckthorn (male; soulname: Prye): Recognized lifemate of Hummer, father of Sprout and Sharpsight. He lived during Mantricker's time. He tried to prove he was better at anything than anyone, which resulted in his age-mate Hummer constantly challenging him to competitions in which she mostly bested him. Because she did not have any patience, he challenged her to a staring contest. He was known for participating in the strangest Recognition in Wolfrider history, as he recognized Hummer after two days and two nights.
- Clearbrook (female): Lifemate of One-Eye and later Treestump, mother of Scouter and an unnamed daughter (sometimes thought to have been called Moth or Moss), grandmother of Pool and adoptive grandmother of Windkin. Clearbrook is a tribal elder of Cutter's Wolfriders and is very serene and wise. One known wolf-friend is Whitebrow, though there are others.
- Cutter (male; soulname: Tam): Also called Kinseeker and Blood of Ten Chiefs, Cutter is the son of Bearclaw and Joyleaf, many possible deceased siblings and half-siblings, grandson of Mantricker and Thornflower, nephew of Treestump (brother of Joyleaf), first cousin of Dewshine, first cousin once removed of Windkin, Recognized lifemate of Leetah (of the Sun Folk), father of Suntop (later called Sunstream), Ember, and Goldruff, adoptive father of Shuna. He is grandfather of Korafay and adoptive grandfather of Shukopek, and the eleventh chief of the Wolfriders. His wolf-friends have been Nightrunner, Warfrost, Holdfast, Filcher for the majority of "Final Quest", and finally Loper. Brave, strong, valiant, wise in the ways of leadership and change and with a deep love and concern for his tribe, he was killed by spider bite near the end of Final Quest. Cutter is the main character of the Elfquest saga.
- Dart (male; soulname: Dyrr): Son of Strongbow and Moonshade, younger brother of (the deceased) Crescent, older brother of Chitter, grandson of Trueflight, Brightwater and possibly Mantricker, Recognized to Serrin (daughter of the Wolfrider Wing, and of Behtia of the Sun Folk), father of (deceased) Bowki, lifemate of Shushen (deceased, of the Sun Folk) close friend of Kimo, former lifemate of Talmah (of the Sun Folk), lifemate of the Wolfrider Mender. Head of the Jackwolfriders, Dart, a natural leader, took it upon himself as a young child to teach the Sun Folk to defend themselves, and later led a lengthy, fateful expedition to the far-southern Forevergreen forest. Dart has significant ability at weaponless martial-arts-like fighting and teaches his skills to all who ask. He is now a tribe member of Cutter's Wolfriders, living in the Father Tree Holt. He aids the adopted human Shuna in her endeavors to reach out to the human tribes surrounding the Holt's forest, and has recently lifemated to Mender.
- Dewshine (female; soulname: Lree): Daughter of Treestump and Rillfisher, niece of Joyleaf, first cousin of Cutter, first cousin once removed of Ember and Sunstream, Recognized to but not lifemate of Tyldak (of Blue Mountain), mother of Windkin, adoptive mother of Pool, grandmother of Teir, lifemate of Scouter and Tyleet. Dewshine is a huntress and gatherer, singer, dancer, storyteller, and the fastest runner and most dexterous of all the Wolfriders. She regularly "scares her tribemates to death" with daring leaps and jumps from and to high places. She is a tribe member of Ember's Wolfriders. Trollhammer, one of her wolf-friends, ironically was killed by a troll's hammer; another of Dewshine's wolf-friends was the pack leader Longshanks.
- Ember (female; soulname: Zheel): Daughter of Cutter and Leetah, twin sister of Suntop/Sunstream, sister of Goldruff, adopted sister of Shuna, granddaughter of Bearclaw, Joyleaf, Toorah and Anatim (Suntoucher), niece of Shenshen, first cousin once removed of Dewshine and great-niece of Treestump, aunt of Korafay, former lovemate of Mender, lifemate of Teir. Ember is twelfth chieftess of the Wolfriders and first chieftess of the Wolfrider previously living on Khulki's Mountain in the New Land. Creative, resourceful, brave, compassionate and forward-thinking, Ember has medium brown skin inherited from her Sun Folk mother, fire-red hair and aqua-colored eyes. Her known wolf-friends have been Choplicker and Patches. Her preferred weapon is the spear.
- Freefoot (male): Son of Huntress Skyfire and possibly Dreamsinger, brother of Nightstar, father of Tanner, Fangslayer, and Longoak by his lifemate Starflower. He was a wanderer and secretly sired a son by recognizing a member of the foreparents of the Go-Backs, then a Goatrider, Two-Shadows, when he wandered on the plains. The son's name was Hawkcatcher. He only encountered his son much later and was attacked by him, Hawkcatcher believing his mother's death was caused by Freefoot's abandonment. He was forced to kill the boy and bury him on the plains. He told no one, but it did not ruin his wandering habits. A sixth chief of the Wolfriders, he died when, while rescuing elf "cubs" (children) from a tree during a thunderstorm, he was struck by lightning (ironically, "skyfire").
- Freetouch (female; formerly Chitter): Daughter of Strongbow and Moonshade, sister to Crescent (deceased) and Dart, lovemate to Pool, Sust, Mender, and others. She was conceived and born during the events of "The Searcher and the Sword". After Strongbow and Moonshade received a vision from the spirit of their daughter Crescent about "joy above and danger below", it turned out the "joy above" was that the couple had Recognized for the third time. Two years later, Moonshade gave birth to Chitter, presumably named because she was a hyperactive toddler who talked and made animal sounds non-stop. Unlike Strongbow, who prefers sending over talking, Chitter liked to talk to anyone within hearing range and usually asked her father to not "think-talk", but "talk like Shuna". When she grew up, she changed her tribe name to Freetouch and left to join Ember's tribe as their tanner. She has light reddish-brown hair and violet eyes.
- Foxfur (female): Member of Bearclaw's tribe known for her namesake fox fur cap, and young Skywise's lovemate despite her greater age, she was killed in Madcoil's rampage against the Wolfriders.
- Goldruff (male): Son of Cutter and Leetah (born after Cutter's death), brother of Sunstream and Ember, adoptive brother of Shuna, grandson of Suntoucher, Toorah, Bearclaw, and Joyleaf. He is lovemate of Jink, Nokkah, and possibly others, and a father of deceased unnamed son. Born two years after the death of his sire, Goldruff resembles Cutter so much that he serves as a living reminder. He grew up listening to stories of the father he never knew; his favorites were the ones about Cutter and Skywise. Despite his sister Shuna being human, Goldruff developed a strong dislike for humans and an intense hatred for their weapons, due to having lost his son to a bullet from a "fire-spitter".
- Goodtree (female; soulname: Neme): Daughter of Tanner and Stormlight, lifemate to both Lionleaper and Acorn, mother of Mantricker and Speedwell, possible grandmother of Spark. The eighth chief of the Wolfriders, she was the only wolf chief with plant-shaping ability and began the shaping of what would become the tribe's first Father Tree, later referred to as "Goodtree's Rest". It is believed she is the great-grandmother of Redlance, through her daughter Speedwell.
- Hummer (female; soulname: Wirr): Recognized lifemate of Buckthorn, mother of Sprout and Sharpsight, she lived during Mantricker's time. It is not known what tribe name she was born with but when she became older she changed it to Hummer, after the hummingbirds she would imitate. She went to prove herself better than her age-mate Buckthorn, which culminated in a staring contest. She was known for participating in the strangest Recognition in Wolfrider history, as she and Buckthorn recognized after staring at each other for two days and two nights.
- Joyleaf (female; soulname: Dehl): Sister of Treestump, aunt of Dewshine, great-aunt of Windkin, Recognized lifemate of Bearclaw, mother of Cutter, grandmother of Ember, Suntop, later called Sunstream, and Goldruff and great-grandmother of Korafay. Joyleaf had long, curly blond hair and blue eyes and was very wise and kind, moderating many of Bearclaw's rash decisions by her gentle influence. Despite this, she was a very keen hunter. She was one of the victims of the monster Madcoil. One of her wolf-friends was called Shadowsheen.
- Kimo (male): Son of Newstar and Lutei (a Sun Villager who was unnamed until Wendy Pini revealed his identity in a July 2006 online column), grandson of Woodlock and Rainsong, great-grandson of Rain the Healer, soulbrother of Dart, close friend of Shuna, the adopted human daughter of Cutter and Leetah. Kimo has blue eyes, blue-black hair, and medium brown skin inherited from his Sun Folk sire. Under the tutelage of Timmain, he has recently developed his shapeshifting talent and often turns himself into a wolf. Kimo, who grew up in the Sun Village, became part of Cutter's tribe. With Dart, he aids Shuna in her outreach efforts to the human tribes surrounding the Father Tree Holt's forest, so much so that he made the decision to stay behind with her when the palace leaves the World of Two Moons. He was slain during the battle against the invading Djunslander army.
- Mantricker (male): Son of Goodtree and Lionleaper, younger brother of Speedwell (a female who was killed in early adulthood), father of Bearclaw and possibly others, and lovemate of Moonshade's mother Brightwater. Ninth chief of the Wolfriders, he was renowned for his constant trickery at the expense of nearby human tribes, yet he also forged a partnership with the human scout Demontricker, which helped keep the peace between elves and humans during Demontricker's lifetime. In later generations, the human tribes kept up their harassment of the Wolfriders, and in desperation Mantricker kidnapped a human boy and cut his face as a warning. A band of human trackers angrily fired blind arrow-shots and spears toward the elf; one spear found its mark, killing the chief. The boy, later revealed as "Scar", held a grudge against elves until his death at Bearclaw's hands. Mantricker had dark brown hair and brown eyes.
- Mender (male): Youngest son of Rainsong and Woodlock, brother to Newstar and Wing, former lovemate of Ember, Yun, and Freetouch, and a lifemate of Dart. Mender grew up in the Sun Village, but later joined the Wolfriders in the New Land, in part to find his heritage, and also to learn from Leetah to use his healing abilities to their best. Mender accompanied Cutter and the other warriors in the battle with Grohmul Djun for the shards of the palace. After the palace was restored, he joined Ember's tribe when Leetah returned to Cutter's. Though briefly told about Teir, he did not learn the extent of the elf's involvement with Ember until years later. At first, Mender tried to sabotage the budding relationship, refusing to become a "golden Rayek to that black-haired Cutter". It took years before he came to terms with their romance. He became lovemate with Yun, but the relationship ended when she left Ember's tribe to join Cutter's. He then developed romantic feelings towards Dart, feelings that deepened until they became lifemates. He has long, blond hair and crystal blue eyes.
- Moonshade (female; soulname: Eyrn): Daughter of Brightwater and possibly of Mantricker, possible half-sister of Bearclaw, lifemate of Strongbow and mother of Crescent (deceased), Dart and Freetouch. She was the leatherworker of Cutter's Wolfriders, and taught her own skills to Tyleet, Shuna, and Freetouch. She was quiet and not a natural fighter, utterly devoted and perhaps a bit subordinate to her lifemate. Recently, she had her wolf-blood removed by Leetah, thus rendering her immortal, to Strongbow's dismay. Though she chose to leave with the palace while her family decided to stay on the World of Two Moons, a short time later Moonshade threw herself in front of Strongbow when a human war-man threatened to shoot him and took the bullet meant to kill him, dying in his arms shortly afterwards. Moonshade had brown curls, violet eyes, and occasionally a bit of a temper and sharp tongue. She was a tribe member and elder of Cutter's Wolfriders.
- Newstar (female): Daughter of Rainsong and Woodlock, sister of Mender and Wing, granddaughter of Rain, niece of Pike, cousin of Sust, lifemate of (the deceased) Lutei of the Sun Folk, mother of Kimo, and occasional lovemate of Skywise. She is very slender and has extremely long straight blond hair and blue eyes; while she lived with the Sun Folk she maintained medium-brown skin, which, now having returned to the forest, has lightened. Newstar is often referred to as the "elfiest elf". She grew up in the Sun Village, but is now a tribe member of Cutter's Wolfriders.
- Nightfall (female; soulname: Twen): Daughter of Longbranch and Brownberry, niece of One-Eye, cousin to Scouter and his unnamed sister, lifemate of Redlance, mother of Tyleet, grandmother of Pool and the human nicknamed Little Patch. Huntress, gatherer, archer, valiant warrior, and great friend and protector of Cutter, with whom she was raised, Nightfall is one of the main characters of the series. She is a tribe member of Cutter's Wolfriders.
- One-Eye (male; soulname: Sur): Brother of Longbranch, uncle of Nightfall, great-uncle of Tyleet, lifemate of Clearbrook, father of Scouter and an unnamed, deceased daughter, grandfather of Pool. Hunter and warrior, One-Eye had brown hair, a brown eye, and an eye patch. He was formerly called Woodhue before humans captured him and gouged out one of his eyes. One-Eye was killed by a Frozen Mountain troll while fighting to free his sword from another troll's fallen body.
- Pike (male): Son of Rain, half-brother of Rainsong, uncle of Newstar, Wing, and Mender, great-uncle of Kimo and Serrin, briefly lovemate of the Go-Back, Vaya, lifemate of (the deceased) Krim and (the deceased) Skot, also of the Go-Backs, possible father of Cheipar (who died in infancy) and stepfather of Sust. Named for his great skill with a spear, he is frequently teased by the Wolfriders for his great love of (intoxicating) dreamberries. Mischievous, happy-go-lucky and a follower by nature, Pike is the howl-keeper (tribal storyteller) and eldest of Ember's Wolfriders, until he left her tribe to rejoin Cutter's in order to be closer to the palace and the spirits of his lifemates Skot and Krim.
- Prey-Pacer (male; soulname: Owm): Youngest child of Rahnee the She-Wolf and Zarhan Fastfire, lifemate of Softfoot, Recognized Wreath, father of Two-Spear, Dove, and Huntress Skyfire (by Wreath), and others. A third chief of the Wolfriders, he had brown eyes and hair.
- Rahnee the She-Wolf (female): Second daughter of Timmorn Yellow-Eyes and Valloa (also called Murrel, later renamed herself New-Wolf), mother of Prey-Pacer and many others, including Ice, Cat, Brighteyes, and Penda. She is the second chief of the Wolfriders and full sister of Laststar. She Recognized her lifemate Zarhan Fastfire multiple times until her "death". When Zarhan sought her out, they discovered a new tribe of plains elves and answered the call of Recognition to different elves.
- Rain (male): Father (with unknown lifemate) of Pike and Rainsong, grandfather of Mender, Wing, and Newstar, great-grandfather of Kimo and (deceased) Serrin, great-great-grandfather of (deceased) Bowki. Healer of the Wolfriders until he was killed by Madcoil, Rain, not nearly as powerful as Leetah or even Mender, had soothing hands and could "sing pain away". He is often referred to as "Rain the Healer".
- Rainsong (female): Daughter of (deceased) Rain, half-sister of Pike, lifemate of (deceased) Woodlock, mother of Newstar, (deceased) Wing, and Mender, grandmother of Kimo and (deceased) Serrin, great-grandmother of Bowki (deceased). Utterly devoted to her unusually large brood of "cubs" (children), Rainsong was called "Lifebearer" and "a wonder" because she and Woodlock had their three offspring within 12 years, a very short time by elfin standards. Like her lifemate Woodlock and her son Wing, she died of old age at Sorrow's End.
- Redlance (male; soulname: Ulm): Lifemate of Nightfall, father of Tyleet, grandfather of Pool and the human nicknamed Little Patch. Plant-shaper, gentle soul, excellent tracker, and lover of children, Redlance has red hair and "face fur" (a beard). Tribe member of Cutter's Wolfriders and formerly called Redmark, she was given his new tribename after rescuing his chief Bearclaw from a longtooth (sabertooth tiger) using a spear.
- Rillfisher (female): Treestump's first lifemate, and Dewshine's mother. Fisher and gatherer, she was killed by a falling tree branch while fishing.
- Scouter (male; soulname: Jial): Son of Clearbrook and (deceased) One-Eye, brother of a deceased, unnamed sister, nephew of (deceased) Longbranch, first cousin of Nightfall, first cousin once removed and also Recognized lifemate of Tyleet, un-Recognized lifemate of Dewshine, father of Pool, adoptive father of Windkin, tribal scout and warrior. He has dark brown hair, sideburns, and brown eyes. Scouter has the best eyesight of both Wolfrider tribes, and possibly the worst temper as well, at least when it comes to protecting his family. When Dewshine and Pool are kidnapped by the human Lehrigen, he temporarily seized control of the tribe from Ember, but later returned the chieftainship to her. He is a tribe member of Ember's Wolfriders.
- Huntress Skyfire (female): Daughter of Prey-Pacer and Wreath, half-sister of Two-Spear, lifemate of Dreamsinger, mother of Freefoot and Nightstar. Fifth chief of the Wolfriders, she gained control of the tribe after challenging her increasingly warlike, psychopathic brother to a duel. Skyfire lost the challenge and was grievously wounded, but Two-Spear, perhaps feeling his grip on the tribe slipping away, exiled himself along with about half the tribe members; his sister became leader of the rest. Skyfire formulated the Way of the Wolfriders, the ethic and habits by which they live.
- Skywise (male; soulname: Fahr): Son of Shale and Eyes High, soul brother of Cutter, considered part of Cutter's family, father of Yun (daughter), father of (daughter) Jink (of the far future), perpetual "ladies' man", and lover of the stars. Casual lovemates were known to include the Glider Aroree; Vurdah, Maleen and Ruffel of the Sun Folk; Newstar; and the unknown Go-back mother of Yun, among others. Skywise, whose parents died at the time of his birth, was raised by the entire tribe of Wolfriders. He is a tribe member of Cutter's Wolfriders, appointed Master of the Palace by Timmain, considered one of the new High Ones, Recognized lifemate of the High One Timmain, whom he also had as a wolf-friend (in wolf shape). Skywise's only other wolf-friend was Starjumper, who was killed in a challenge with Dodia's jack-wolf Skimsand. He chose never to take another wolf-friend who would someday die. After being kidnapped by Rayek into the future, Skywise asked Leetah to take away his wolf-blood so that he could spend as much time as was needed to find a way back to his soul-brother. Ironically, only hours later, it was revealed that Cutter and the Wolfriders had spent most of the intervening 10,000 years in suspended animation until the kidnapped elves returned to them. Years later, Skywise achieved his lifelong dream of traveling to the stars, as he left with the palace along with Timmain and other elves.
- Strongbow (male; soulname: Wyl): Son of (deceased) Trueflight and an unknown father, lifemate of (deceased) Moonshade, father of (deceased) Crescent and of Dart and Chitter, grandfather of (deceased) Bowki. Archer and elder of Cutter's band, Strongbow and his lifemate Moonshade are the tribal conservatives, standing fast against unwise change and acting as keepers of the Way of the Wolfriders. Strongbow's psychic "sending" ability is the strongest of any Wolfrider but the powerful Sunstream; of the rest, only Cutter approaches his mental range and force. After exposure to the restored Palace, Strongbow develops the ability to shoot his prey without aiming, even through trees and over obstructions. He has russet brown hair and eyes and "face fur". His known wolf-friends have been Briarsting, Lashpaw and Gnawbone. He chose to stay on the World of Two Moons, even after Moonshade decided to go with the palace. After he lost his lifemate when she died trying to save him from humans, and after Cutter's death, he joins Skywise in travelling the stars. An elf believed to be Strongbow (and referred to as "Archer") appears in the time of Jink of the Future Folk.
- Sunstream (male; formerly called Suntop; soulname: Klynn): Son of Cutter and Leetah, twin brother of Ember, brother of Goldruff, adopted brother of Shuna, grandson of Anatim (Suntoucher), Toorah, Bearclaw and Joyleaf, nephew of Shenshen, great-nephew of Treestump, first cousin once removed of Dewshine, second cousin of Windkin. He is Recognized lifemate of Brill of the Wavedancers; their relationship is long-distance. He has blond hair and blue eyes and is by far the tallest of the Wolfriders. Member of Cutter's tribe, he is one of at least nine known elves who can "go out" into the spirit world. Sunstream, whose sending power is almost unlimited, has a deep magic-sensing ability and is to become the conduit by which all elves communicate over long distances.
- Tanner (male; originally named Oakroot; soulname: Lhu): Son of Freefoot and Starflower, lifemate to Stormlight, father of Goodtree. Seventh chief of the Wolfriders, he had one of the longest tribal reigns (some 700 years) and certainly one of the most peaceful, marked by the absence of run-ins with humans. He stumbled across the method for tanning leathers, after a human hunter (jokingly referred to as "Lift-Leg") inadvertently urinated into a bundle of skins he was storing.
- Timmorn Yellow-Eyes (male): The first Wolfrider chief and the first Wolfrider ever, he is the son of Timmain (a High One who had shaped herself into a wolf) and a true male wolf, lifemate to Valloa (also called Murrel or New-Wolf), but lovemate to many others, father of Rahnee the She-Wolf, Wreath, Laststar, Threetoe the Father, Frost, Glowstone, Sharpears, Journey, and many others. Even Timmorn never knew how many children he had fathered.
- Treestump (male): Brother of Joyleaf, uncle of Cutter, lifemate of Rillfisher (deceased) and now Clearbrook, father of Dewshine, grandfather of Windkin, great-grandfather of Teir, great-uncle of Sunstream and Ember. Hunter and warrior, Treestump is the Wolfriders' most robust and physically powerful tribe member. Treestump was once named Birdcall; his name was changed when, during an attack by trolls, he refused to be moved, thus saving himself and Bearclaw. He has curly blond hair and thick "face fur". Treestump, the oldest living Wolfrider, is second-chief of Cutter's Wolfriders, and up until recently has been the one to take over when Cutter is absent. Due to the need of Cutter's Wolfriders for metal weapons, with great difficulty Treestump has recently taught himself blacksmithing, using tools left behind by trolls. His work has become such that it has even been complimented by the master smith Two-Edge, which Treestump considers the highest praise earned.
- Two-Spear (male; soulname: Marr): Son of Prey-Pacer, lifemate to Willowgreen, brother of Huntress Skyfire and Dove, father of Kahvi (the future Go-Back chieftess), grandfather of Vaya (deceased), Venka and Teir. Fourth chief of the Wolfriders, he went by the tribe name Swift-Spear until humans killed his wolf-friend Blackmane while the two were psychically connected. Many Wolfriders, including his sister Skyfire, believed that event to be the beginning of the madness Two-Spear was famous for; it was also the beginning of his deep and abiding hatred for humans. Later, he launched a brutal attack on a neighboring tribe of humans he believed to blame for the death of his elder sister Dove, an attack which his sister Skyfire feared would lead to an all-out war that might annihilate the elves. Convinced her brother was slipping into insanity, she duelled with him to seize control of the tribe but failed, suffering near-fatal wounds in the process. Despite his victory, Two-Spear immediately quit the tribe along with a group of his supporters; his faction later evolved into the Go-Back tribe under the leadership of his daughter, Kahvi.
- Tyleet (female; soulname: Sohn): Daughter of Nightfall and Redlance, granddaughter of Brownberry and Longbranch, great-niece of One-Eye, first cousin once removed and Recognized lifemate of Scouter, lifemate of Dewshine, mother of Pool, and adopted mother of human son Little Patch. Huntress, linguist, and tanner, she has narrow, hazel eyes and wavy, light reddish hair in a distinctive triple-tiered hairdo; sometimes she gains white strands that her parents claim predict the coming winter's severity and duration. Tyleet, probably the sweetest and gentlest of all the Wolfriders owing to her upbringing in a time of near-complete safety and security, is very fond of humans and once adopted and raised a human baby (Little Patch). Tyleet befriended a human family in order to learn the language of the New Land humans and pass it on to other elves, in order to aid in the recovery of the stolen Palace. A tribe member of Ember's Wolfriders, her name means "Healer's Gift".
- Wing (male): Son of Woodlock and Rainsong, brother of Mender and Newstar, uncle of Kimo, Recognized lifemate of Behtia (of the Sun Folk), father of Serrin and grandfather of Bowki. He considered himself a Sun Villager and passed almost all of his long life there. He had his mother's blond hair and blue eyes. He died of old age at Sorrow's End a few hundred years after the passing of his parents.

== Sun Folk Elves ==
- Ahdri (female): Granddaughter of Tekshu, great-great-granddaughter of Alekah, great-great-great-great-granddaughter of Savah, and a lovemate of Windkin and Two-Edge. Working near the Little Palace - a chunk of the Palace of the High Ones shaped by Ekuar and gifted to the Sun Folk in Kings of the Broken Wheel - one day, she discovered a latent ability to rock-shape that she later developed to defend Sorrow's End and ultimately save the Sun Village, first from the nearby volcano's eruption and later from attacking humans. In the act of saving the Little Palace from the troll Thuggop and the attacking humans, Ahdri took a human arrow in the back as she crossed the Bridge of Destiny. She collapsed the bridge with the troll on it and hid behind the sun symbol, where preservers wrapped her wounded body. She was later discovered by half-mad Holt-trolls tunneling under the desert and used her rock-shaping powers to unearth gems for them, to keep them from unwrapping and possibly killing her. She was discovered in a pit by Treestump and Clearbrook and eventually healed by Leetah. She reunited with Windkin, who had long thought her dead. After some years, she became lovemates with the half-troll, half-elf Two-Edge, whom she is helping to "explore his elfin half". At some point between Final Quest and Stargazer's Hunt she became chieftess of the Go-Backs. She has long, curly golden brown hair, and golden-brown eyes.
- Dodia (female): A member of the Jack-Wolfriders, Recognized mate of Door (Ekolin), and a mother of Harotim. Huntress and defender of her village, she has short black hair and purple eyes. Her jack-wolf, Skimsand, killed Skywise's wolf-friend Starjumper in a challenge. Dodia attacked Door when his madness threatened Dart and the others captive inside the human city in the Forevergreen. Although at first she was later shown to have stayed in the Forevergreen and raise her son, No-Name, in secret, her history was retconned in Final Quest to show that she did, in fact, accompany her friends when they were rescued from the Forevergreen and lived in the palace with the other Sun Folk, giving birth to and raising her son Harotim. She was one of the elves who encouraged Ekolin to come into the palace to be greeted by love, rather than encase it in stone as he originally planned. Once he entered the palace, she introduced him to their son.
- Leetah (female): Daughter of Toorah and Anatim (better known as Suntoucher), sister of Shenshen, friend and former lovemate of Rayek, Recognized lifemate of Cutter, mother of Suntop (later renamed Sunstream), Ember, and Goldruff, adoptive mother of the human girl Shuna, grandmother of Shuna's son Shukopek and Sunstream's and Brill's daughter Korafay. Throughout the story Leetah explores her powers over life and death and the moral implications that arise. She has medium brown skin, auburn hair and green eyes "the color of new leaves", and she's slightly taller than Cutter, not counting both of their hair. Her name means 'healing light'.
- Maleen (female): Lovemate of Vurdah, Shenshen, Newstar, Ruffel and Skywise, she has long black hair and dark eyes.
- Rayek (male): Son of Jarrah and Ingen, friend and one-time lovemate of Leetah, one-time lovemate also of Kahvi who bore him the daughter named Venka, lovemate and soul-brother of Winnowill, and a grandfather of Satreeka, he has long straight black hair and amber eyes. He has many growing powers, such as telekinesis, floating, a paralyzing stare and the ability to shelter other elven spirits in his body. His name means "Child of the Rocks".
- Ruffel (female): Lovemate of Vurdah, Maleen, Shenshen, Newstar and Skywise, she had blondish-red hair and blue eyes. Ruffel was killed by a lightning bolt.
- Savah (female): Daughter of Hassbet and an unknown father, mother of many Sun Villagers, lifemate of Yurek, great-great-great-great-grandmother of Ahdri. Last of the original settlers of the Sun Village, she is their gentle Mother of Memory. As their founder she is their unquestioned leader in all spiritual matters and her advice is valued, her wisdom considered sacrosanct. She has many magical abilities and her skills mean she is mentor at some point and to some extent to any villager with magical gifts. Rayek's skills blossom under her tutelage. Later she becomes a mentor to Suntop/Sunstream and to Ahdri, when Ahdri's long dormant rockshaping ability surfaces in the presence of the small palace. Savah's shown magical abilities are: astral travel, sending (telepathy, common amongst elves, though rare in Sun Folk), sensing magic, creating soft illumination that seems tied to her souls presence and some degree of fire-starting (she lights the lamps at the Festival of Flood and Flower). She can also use her mental gifts to "tame" zwoots, a skill she passed on to Rayek. She has long silver hair and golden-brown eyes.
- Shenshen (female): Daughter of Toorah and Anatim a.k.a. Suntoucher, younger sister of Leetah, aunt of Sunstream, Ember, and Goldruff, grand-aunt of Shukopek and Korafay. In the Final Quest series, she is transformed (by her own wish) into a human to follow her calling as a midwife, since Elves bear children only infrequently. She has auburn hair and yellow-green eyes.
- Shushen (male): Lovemate and soul-brother of Dart, Shushen was among those killed in the Go-Back tribe's attack on Sorrow's End. He had dark hair and dark eyes.
- Sun-Toucher (male; given name: Anatim): Lifemate to Toorah, father of Leetah and Shenshen, grandfather of Sunstream, Ember, and Goldruff. He studies the sun and its patterns to guide Sun Villagers in their farming; he went blind in early adulthood by looking into the sun too often, but prefers this state and declines to have his daughter restore his sight and he says his blindness has allowed him to learn to "see" in other ways. He became a mentor to Skywise while the Wolfrider's dwelled in the Sun Village and they would often study the skies together. He is considered the Sun Folk's day to day leader and, after Savah, the tribe's eldest.
- Thiro (male): An early lovemate of Leetah, Thiro was killed when a zwoot (a sort of camel-horse hybrid) Rayek had tamed suddenly came to its senses and attacked him. He had brown hair and blue eyes.
- Toorah (female): Lifemate of Anatim the Sun-Toucher and mother of Leetah and Shenshen. Before Leetah's birth she provided the Sun Folk with a true healer, Toorah's gift with a needle and thread and her many salves and unguents provided much needed medical aid to her folk. She appears to have similar coloring as her daughters but is always hidden in a full-length, hooded robe.
- Vurdah (female): A lovemate of Maleen, Ruffel, and Skywise, she greatly desired to Recognize Skywise, but eventually gave up. She had auburn hair and green eyes.
- Windkin (male): Recognized son of Tyldak and Dewshine, adopted son of Scouter, and a father of Teir by Kahvi, he can fly and has long, curly brown hair and brown eyes. Though he was born half Wolfrider, his wolf blood was forced from him through the dark magic of Winnowill's shapechanging, making him immortal. Raised in the Sun Village, he becomes the lovemate of Savah's handmaiden, Ahdri. In the Final Quest Prologue, he is found in the deserted Sun Village after having lived with Kahvi and Tyldak for a period of time. He is reunited with the rest of the Elves, including Ahdri, whom he thought dead.
- Yurek (male): Lifemate of Savah. Along with Savah, he was one of the original elves who fled a faraway forest to found Sorrow's End. A rockshaper, he expended much effort in creating the Bridge of Destiny, a rock arch high above the village. After completing the Bridge of Destiny, his severely weakened form finally tumbled from the windy heights. In new art from Wendy Pini, he is revealed to have light auburn hair and violet eyes and the brown skin (tanned, not inherently brown as he and the other founders were originally forest dwellers) of other Sun Folk. His spirit was one of the ones who alerted Sunstream and the other living elves to Door's journey and presence and his diabolical plans for the palace.

== Glider Elves ==
Unless otherwise noted, all Gliders have the inherent ability to float/fly. Gliders are immortal and are considered First-, Second-, and Thirdborns of the original High Ones. They resided in Blue Mountain and are considered an extinct tribe.

- Lord Voll (male): Founder of the Gliders and a long-time lovemate of Winnowill, he states he is the child of High Ones, possibly Deir and Gibra, who had birthed a son called Vol in the years after the Palace fell. He was the leader of the Gliders for many years. He lived in a state of depression believing his people to be going stagnant and believed there were no more elven children. Upon seeing Ember and Suntop, he became rejuvenated, until a dark sending from Winnowill put him into a deep sleep. When Leetah woke him from his sleep he asked the Wolfriders to seek the Palace of the High Ones with him. When they declined he offered to help them find a new holt, but instead forced them to follow him to the palace. A projectile fired by trolls from a giant ballista impaled Voll and his bond-bird, Tenspan, killing both and earning the Wolfriders the scorn of many of the Gliders, with Aroree and Tyldak being possibly the only ones not to blame them.
- Winnowill (female): Once lovemated to Lord Voll and later Rayek's love mate, mother of Two-Edge, and the first elf to master black sending, or pain telepathy, she was a healer, but after the Gliders retreated into the safety of Blue Mountain, her gift was not needed and festered. Her mental state degraded at the growing despair of realizing herself as useless in placid society. In order to cling to her remaining sanity, she purposely injured her fellow Gliders to practice her gift. She controlled the Chosen Eight, and secretly the lives of all Gliders. Voll once asked her to help the female Gliders bear children, and she did, only to make them miscarry in secret, knowing Blue Mountain would not support more of their kind. Winnowill finally decided to find the Palace for Voll's sake and her own, and left the mountain alone, only to encounter an injured troll named Smelt, who had been sent to collect rockshapers. Winnowill nursed him back to health and, out of what she called "perverse curiosity", seduced Smelt and mated with him. The half-elf, half-troll Two-Edge was the result of that union. Winnowill killed Smelt when he remembered what he had come to the mountain for, then locked up and tortured Two-Edge when the child threatened to go to Lord Voll to report what she had done. She returned to the Gliders as a sadistic megalomaniac, and has been the principal elfin villain of the series. When the arrival of the Wolfriders threatened to lead her people back to the outside world, she tried to prevent this. Later she tried to annihilate the Wolfriders. She spent about ten thousand years creating monsters and playing with the humans in the new land, known to some of them as Lady of the Waves. The Palace of the High Ones was destroyed when she tried to conquer it, and was thwarted by Rayek and his daughter Venka. She shape-changed herself into a human to attempt to gain mastery over the shards, but was thwarted again, this time by Rayek, Venka, the Wolfriders, and Timmain. Immediately before it was restored, she let herself be killed to free her soul, so that her spirit could wreak havoc worldwide using the Palace. Rayek intervened by absorbing her spirit into himself, claiming that since he once held all the spirits of the Gliders, he could hold her. Since that time she has been vying for control of his body, even occasionally reshaping it into her female form, and constantly resisting his efforts to make her renounce evil. Winnowill is gradually gaining more control over her magic, but the two elves are in constant struggle.
- Aroree (female): Member of the Chosen Eight and a lovemate of Skywise, Aroree was one of the Chosen Eight. Even after falling in love with Skywise and wanting to be free she was loyal to Winnowill and did not leave the Gliders until she kidnapped Windkin, Tyldak's son, whom gave to Winnowill as a replacement for herself, triggering the events of The Siege of Blue Mountain. There is some tension between her and the other elves as a result of her kidnapping of the infant Windkin. She later helped both Rayek and Kahvi attain their destinations as she wanders the skies on her giant bondbird, Littletrill. She would later join the Wolfriders and became a respected member of the tribe, and a teacher. After the restoration of the palace she accompanied Venka, hoping to find Tyldak. She stayed with the Go-Backs after Venka became their chieftess. Many years later, she encountered a grown Windkin, who had come seeking her and Venka to inform them about Kahvi and Tyldak's deaths and of Kahvi's son, Teir. Windkin forgave Aroree for having kidnapped him, allowing her to finally forgive herself. She accompanied Venka and the Go-Backs to the palace. She and Aurek (Egg) later reunited with fellow Glider Ekolin (Door) when he entered the palace and tearfully watched as he died in their arms a short time later. She is very tall for an elf, with long blonde hair and large blue eyes; her nickname is Sad Eyes.
- Tyldak (male): Lovemate of Kahvi, recognized the Wolfrider Dewshine, father of Windkin, and grandfather of Teir. Tyldak loved flying so much that he asked Winnowill to re-shape his body to have wings instead of arms, so that he could truly fly. He was loyal to Winnowill, partly because he felt he owed her for this favor. He recognized Dewshine, resulting in the cub Windkin who floats. Winnowill later betrays him, chaining him to the throne hall floor, never again to fly. He was freed by Two-Edge during the frenzy of the Fall of Blue Mountain. He took the Go-Back chieftess Kahvi as his lovemate. He was extraordinarily devoted to her, and claimed he must "protect" her from herself. After being reunited with his son Windkin, the three went on a quest to find Winnowill, for Tyldak to regain his wingless appearance and Windkin to gain wings. They met many other humans groups, some which worshiped Tyldak and others who wanted him as a trophy. After being wounded by a human, Tyldak begged Kahvi to kill him, which she did by puncturing his neck and letting him bleed to death. After avenging his death and cremating his body, Windkin and Kahvi parted ways. Unshaped, Tyldak had curly golden brown hair and brown eyes.
- Aurek (male; formerly known as Egg): One of the rockshapers that were in a permanent trace, living only to fulfill their purpose. His was shaping the Egg of Six Spheres, a floating stone egg that showed in pictures the history of the elves - this was only possible because he had knowledge of it. After the death of Lord Voll he had a vision of Timmain, charging him with remembering, and starting to wake him up. He survived the fall of Blue Mountain with the help of Two-Edge and built a more humble home in the remains. Aurek created two "eggs", one was destroyed with the Gliders, and the other was taken by Kahvi herself as a trophy for her people. With one of these Aurek showed Kahvi her own past and the origin of the Go-Backs to her. Thousands of years later, he came to live in the Palace of the High Ones, reuniting with fellow Glider Aroree and then Ekolin (Door), the latter of whom died a short time later. About a millennium later on the World of Two Moons, he becomes a mentor to Jink, the elf-woman living among the humans of Abode's space age. He has pale hair and pale eyes, and seems to enjoy nature and animals. He has some small floating ability.
- Kureel (male): One of the Chosen Eight, loyal to Winnowill, and hostile toward the Wolfriders, the latter in part because they killed a young giant hawk that would have been his bond bird when grown. After the fall of Blue Mountain, he tried to kill Dart and his human friend Geoki, and was in turn killed by Strongbow. Deeply guilty for this albeit necessary act, Strongbow sought Kureel's soul in the Palace to ask for forgiveness. For his part, Kureel was at peace and barely remembered the circumstances of his death, and with that circumstance in mind, granted Stongbow's request immediately.
- Door (male; also called Ekolin): Recognized to Dodia and a father of Harotim, he shaped Winnowill's secret chambers, and was put into a permanent trance after he had nearly let Two-Edge's father escape. He stayed loyal to Winnowill, trying to keep the chambers secured even while Blue Mountain was collapsing, but Cutter forced him to make a way to the outside. The Hoan G'Tay Sho took him with them on their search for a new home in the rainforests of Sunholt, then spent the next 10,000 years building an elaborate elf-based religion around him, but it took him millennia to return to lucidity, which immediately turned to rage and hatred. He lured Windkin and some of the Jack-wolf riders to the Forevergreen, where he tried to draw Windkin on his side, to help him rebuild the Gliders, and to rule the humans. He Recognized the Sun Villager Dodia, who, ashamed at being pregnant by such an evil man, beat him with a club. At first, Door was presumed dead, but is later revealed in Final Quest that he survived the beating and, after kidnapping the Go-Back Chot, forced him to help find the shards of the Little Palace. Once he found it, he used his rock-shaping skills to journey underground until they were under the palace, with the intent of encasing it in stone and not allowing it to fly away until the other elves promised to worship him as their lord and leader. Unbeknownst to him, however, the spirits of the Rockshapers and Gliders sensed his presence and journey and alerted the living elves, including Sunstream. Rather than attack Door, elves living and spirit invited him to enter the palace and be greeted and forgiven. Unused to, and confused by, such love and compassion, an overwhelmed Ekolin came inside, where he was reunited with fellow Gliders Aurek and Aroree, the latter of whom he remembered as having taken care of him when he was Winnowill's slave. He then saw Dodia, who introduced him to their son, Harotim, who resembled him in both form and rockshaping abilities. It was then Door realized he had actually grown very weary of his long life on the World of Two Moons. He soon died in Aroree and Aurek's arms, his body "dissolving" and his spirit joining those of Lord Voll and the other deceased Gliders.
- Door (female; also called Innekah): A rockshaper in permanent trance, in charge of the main gate of Blue Mountain, she was killed in the mountain's collapse.
- Reevol (male): One of the Chosen Eight, he was the one who took Dewshine out of Blue Mountain when the Wolfriders wanted to exchange her and Windkin for the Preservers.
- The other Chosen were Eresir, Talno, Oroleed, Hoykar (all male and deceased) and Yeyeen (female, deceased).
- Brace (male; also called Kaitek): One of many Gliders who became an unconscious "tool" within Blue Mountain, he became nothing but a living brace rock-shaping a doorway to prevent its collapse. He died in the fall of Blue Mountain.
- Harotim (male): Son of Door (Ekolin) and the Sun Villager Dodia. Originally, his mother Dodia stayed in the Forevergreen and raised her son, then called No-Name, in secret, keeping him in chains and preventing him from using his rockshaping abilities out of fear the evil spirit of his father would come claim him. In Final Quest, their histories were retconned so that, instead of living in a cave in the Forevergreen, Dodia accompanied her friends to the palace, where she gave birth to and raised her son, naming him Harotim. Harotim not only resembles his father in looks, he has also inherited Ekolin's rockshaping abilities, but instead of shaping stone, he uses his powers to shape the crystal the palace is made of, becoming, in Dodia's words, the most accomplished crystal-shaper. Harotim, along with Dodia and other elves, invited Ekolin inside the palace rather than encase it in stone. Father and son met for the first, and last, time, as Ekolin died a short time later.

== Go-Back Elves ==
While the Go-Backs are technically immortal (with the possible exception of Kahvi and her descendants), they have lifespans no longer than—and often shorter than—those of the mortal Wolfriders, thanks to their warlike and reckless lifestyle; thus, in their attitudes toward life and death, they are more like the Wolfriders than like the other immortal elves.

- Kahvi (female): The original chief of the Go-Backs in the series, Kahvi is a daughter of Two-Spear and Willowgreen, former lovemate to Rayek, Cutter and Tyldak, as well as many others, mother of Vaya, Venka, Teir, and possibly more, and a grandmother of Satreeka. Very stubborn and rowdy, she was a strong, loyal chief. She was killed by the human Lehrigen. She had long brown hair and green eyes.
- Krim (female): Cave guard, she later gave birth to two sons, Sust and Cheipar. She was killed in a fight with Angrif Djun. She had short blonde hair and blue eyes.
- Chot (male): Zey's second in command, he later adjusts to life in the Sun Village when he is spared, tormenting Suntop and falling in love with Shenshen. He later joins Jethel in Forevergreen. Years later, he is captured by Door and is forced to find the shards of the Little Palace and follow Door to the caverns underneath the larger Palace, which the latter planned to encase in stone. Once Door died, Chot tried to make off with the Little Palace but was caught by Windkin and brought before his fellow Go-Backs, who were disgusted with his betrayal and cowardice. He met up again with Yun, who gave him a "beating that he was owed".
- Urda (female): Kahvi's trusted friend, watcher of the children and co-second in command, she is presumed to have been killed by trolls. She had white hair and pale eyes.
- Mardu (female): Kahvi's trusted second-in-command, who later serves as the Go-Backs' acting chief when Kahvi is away (which was increasingly often). She taunted Rayek constantly and was finally backhanded for her tongue. She has red-brown hair and brown eyes.
- Mirff (male): Lovemate to Venka and an unnamed female Go-Back, and a father of Venka's daughter Satreeka.
- Skot (male): Cave guard, he is later killed in the Shards era battle for the Palace, shortly after fathering Sust and/or Cheipar. He had a strong desire to be a father. He had long dark brown hair and brown eyes.
- Vaya (female): Kahvi's daughter and Pike's one-time lovemate, she was captured in an opening skirmish in the Battle for the Palace while holding off the mountain trolls so the others could escape. She was brought before King Guttlekraw, who was about to torture her for military information. Both to protect the tribe and desiring a worthy death her enemies would never grant, she grabbed a dagger and lunged at the troll king, successfully provoking his guards to kill her before Guttlekraw could learn anything. Later, her discarded body was collected by Two-Edge and left in the secret armory clothed in armor to inspire her tribe to wear armor as well. She had brown hair and brown eyes.
- Venka (female): Kahvi and Rayek's daughter, she is raised by the Wolfriders after her parents disappeared. Venka is a sister of Vaya (deceased) and Teir, lovemate to Zhantee, Mirff, and possibly others (including an unnamed female Go-Back), and a mother of Satreeka. Known for her temperance and her skill at countering Winnowill's sendings, she believes her destiny is intertwined with the Go-Backs and wants to be their chief after her mother's death. She gave leadership of the Go-Backs to Ember and Teir and left with the other elves in the palace when it departed the World of Two Moons. She has black hair and yellow eyes, and dark skin.
- Yif (male): This elf was healed by Leetah, but was later killed in the Elf-Troll War.
- Yun (female): Skywise's daughter with an unknown Go-Back, an adoptive mother of Khorbasi, and a lovemater of Mender. Very stubborn and outspoken, she also loves the stars. She has white blonde hair and pale blue eyes.
- Zey (male): Possible son of Mardu, a young upstart who took over while Kahvi was out. His henchman was Chot. He attacked the Sun Folk pointlessly, starting a massacre on both tribes. They used Greymung's old tunnels to get there. Kahvi kills him in the battle, as it turns out she was resting with the Sunfolk at the time. He had red-brown hair and dark eyes.

== WaveDancer elves ==
- Brill (female): Twin sister of Krill (likely an identical twin, though extensive flesh-shaping has obscured their similarities), Recognized lifemate of Sunstream, and a mother of Korafay. She has long brown hair and deep blue eyes, and has the power of astral projection. Brill is one of the few Wavedancers to leave the World of Two Moons in the Palace.
- Coral (female): Mother of Surge, she was the former chieftess of the WaveDancers and possibly the first WaveDancer to be killed by men.
- Darshek (male): Son of Longfin and Pirn, half-brother of Sandsparkle, and a lovemate of Krill. He has long light brown hair and caramel eyes. He is a metal-shaper who was nearly killed by captain Ardan Djarum, only to be rescued by his mother and his lovemate (the exact tale of his rescue remains to be told).
- Drift (male): Lifemate of Fairshell and father of Moonmirror, he has blond hair and brown eyes. Drift and his lifemates were killed together with Skimmer, making their daughter an orphan. The human ship responsible for their death was sunk, and their bodies were brought back to the village by Snakeskin and Krill. Drift favored the color brown.
- Fairshell (female): Lifemate of Drift and mother of Moonmirror, she has long white blond hair and deep blue eyes. Fairshell and her lifemate were killed together with Skimmer, making their young daughter an orphan. The human ship responsible for their deaths was sunk, and their bodies were brought back to the village by Snakeskin and Krill. Fairshell favored the color violet.
- Farbright (female): Lifemate of Haze, possibly the mother of Brill and Krill. She has long brown hair and deep blue eyes, and had a scarlet fishtail. She was a flesh-shaper. She and her lifemate were among the first WaveDancers to be killed by men (together with Chieftess Coral). Her body was brought back to the village by Snakeskin. She favored the color bright blue.
- Foam (female): Daughter of Salt and Spray, Recognized lifemate of Strand, and mother of Puffer. She is short, curly, and has red hair and violet eyes.
- Gull (gender unknown; only mentioned): Gull was one of the elves who sailed off Crest Point with Zephyr and were killed by humans.
- Haze (male): Lifemate of Farbright, possibly the father of Brill and Krill. He has long turquoise hair and deep green eyes. He and his lifemate were among the first WaveDancers to be killed by men (together with Chieftess Coral). His body was brought back to the village by Spine. He favored the color green.
- Korafay (female): Daughter of Brill and Sunstream, and lovemate of Reef. She has green hair and green eyes, and has the power of floating.
- Krill (female): Twin sister of Brill, lovemate of Darshek, and a hunter. She has short brown hair and ice blue eyes, and favors the color red.
- Kroosh (male): Son of Redcrest and Pearl, younger brother of Strand, uncle of Puffer. He has long flame-red hair and green eyes. He is a hunter and favors the color blue.
- Longfin (female): Lifemate of Pirn and Shadowcrest, mother of Sandsparkle and Darshek and grandmother of an unnamed child who died young. She has long bluish-gray hair and dark violet eyes. She is a rockshaper and favors opalescent colors.
- Moonmirror (female): Daughter of Drift and Fairshell, she has long whiteblond hair and deep blue eyes. Like her mother, Moonmirror favors the color violet and looks all in all like a miniature copy of Fairshell.
- No-Ripple (female): Lifemate of Stormsong and mother of Tumble, lovemate of Spine and Snakeskin. She has long brown hair and warm brown eyes.
- Pearl (female; only mentioned): Lifemate of Redcrest, mother of Kroosh and Strand, grandmother of Puffer.
- Pirn (male; only mentioned): Lifemate of Longfin, father of Darshek, but died before his son's birth.
- Puffer (male): Son of Strand and Foam, grandson of Salt, Spray, Redcrest and Coral, nephew of Kroosh. He has short red hair and dark brown eyes.
- Redcrest (male): Lifemate of Pearl, father of Strand and Kroosh, grandfather of Puffer, and a treeshaper. He has long red curls and green eyes.
- Reef (male): He has no living relatives and is a lovemate of Korafay. He was a healer, but lost this ability after being tormented by Winnowill when he tried to heal her. He lived for thousands of years with the WaveDancers as "the Broken One", a misshapen creature who spoke nonsensically (almost in riddles), was unable to send, and refused to be healed. Only when the Wolfrider chief Cutter pieced together enough of his mutterings to figure out what happened did Reef finally decide to allow himself to be healed in the Palace. He eventually regains enough self-shaping ability to shift between his elfin form and that of a large, powerful, monstrous-looking creature. Despite his healing, he still lived in extreme fear of Winnowill's spirit, until he finally had the chance to confront her. Once he realized that what she had done to him was a complete accident, he forgave her, allowing his spirit to finally be healed.
- Salt (male): Lifemate of Spray, father of Foam, grandfather of Puffer, and a flesh-shaper. He was one of the few Wavedancers to accompany the Palace when it left the World of Two Moons.
- Sandsparkle (female): Daughter of Longfin and Shadowcrest, lifemate of Skimback, mother-to-be. She has long sandy blond hair and deep green eyes.
- Shadowcrest (male; only mentioned): Lifemate of Longfin and father of Sandsparkle, would-be grandfather to Come.
- Skimback (male): Lovemate of Brill, lifemate of Sandsparkle, and a healer.
- Skimmer (female): Deceased lifemate of Surge and mother of Snakeskin, she was a healer and flesh-shaper.
- Snakeskin (male): Son of Surge and Skimmer, and lovemate of No-Ripple. He has long blond hair and amber eyes. He is the chieftain and a healer.
- Spine (male) - Brother of Stormsong, lovemate of No-Ripple, uncle of Tumble. Reddish brown Mohawk and deep green eyes.
- Spray (female): Lifemate of Salt, mother of Foam and grandmother of Puffer. She has long curly red hair and yellow eyes. Spray was one of the few Wavedancers to accompany the Palace when it left the World of Two Moons.
- Stormsong (male; only mentioned): Deceased brother of Spine, Recognized lifemate of No-Ripple, and father of Tumble.
- Strand (male): Son of Redcrest and Pearl, brother of Kroosh, Recognized Lifemate of Foam and father of Puffer.
- Surge (male): Son of Coral, Recognized lifemate of Skimmer and father of Snakeskin. He is a watershaper (hydrokinetic) and former chieftain of the WaveDancers, but has since died.
- Tumble (male): Son of No-Ripple and Stormsong, nephew of Spine, he has long curly blue black hair.
- Wavecatcher (male): A flesh-shaper, he is one of only two survivors of a clan that attempted to found a new colony, only to be massacred by a human army. He has a tremendous obsession with the land-elf Yun, who he surprised as she gazed into a forest pond. It is hinted that they might Recognize.
- Wavelet (female): Along with Wavecatcher as the other survivor of the ill-fated WaveDancer colony, she was adopted as an infant by a man of the Hungtsho (the tropical human tribe descended from the Hoan G'Tay Sho) and became revered for plant-shaping abilities that guaranteed the village bountiful harvests. She is recently rediscovered by Wavecatcher.
- Zephyr (male): Founder of Cavernsong, the colony of WaveDancers that was virtually wiped out during a human battle.

== Original WaveDancers elves ==
This series, published in 1993–94, was produced by artist Jozef Szekeres and co-writers Julie Ditrich and Bruce Love of Black Mermaid Productions in Australia. Because of a legal dispute between that studio and Warp Graphics over the ownership of the characters, the series was stripped of its place as a canonical Elfquest story. A court settlement between Black Mermaid and Warp prevents either company from republishing the six-issue series in whole, with Black Mermaid having the rights to the characters of OWD and Warp Graphics the WaveDancers title/name.

- Ailsa was the soulmate of Brom and mother of Raenafel. She had long frosty white hair, and died in childbirth.
- Ausra was one of the original five High Ones who fled from the palace after the bloodbath with the humans. She was lost to the Wailing River and believed drowned, but returned later on the back of a white horned whale to save three of her companions. The other High One drowned. Ausra was the mother of the WaveDancer colony and taught the others how to coexist in the watery world. She wore a necklace with a large crystal talisman in the centre. The narwhal was her companion, and she was a flesh shaper and healer. After establishing the colony, she flesh-shaped her legs into a tail along with the other three first comers and some of the other elves from later generations.
- Barmek is the son of Kirith and Rhialdor, and does not take himself as seriously as his brother Jormak does. Barmek is smart and has very good instincts. He has the adventurous spirit of an explorer and is not afraid to take risks. Most of the time he is friendly and gentle, but if his loved ones are threatened he can be savage and show his teeth. Barmek is 5 feet tall, average height for a WaveDancer, with a crop of golden hair and laughing brown eyes. He recognises with Raenafel who he first accidentally encountered when he was just a young squirt.
- Brom is a father of Raenafel and soulmate of Ailsa, was the third generation Crown and younger half brother of Shardon. Brom was marked by the Cursemaker who flesh-shaped Brom's hairline into a beard to look like the much feared humans. Brom hid his daughter to protect her from the Curse of Recognition, but after Barmek's discovery he had to send her inland with No-Wing in search of the Palace of the High Ones. He was a strong, majestic and determined leader. He never rested and was ever vigilant and quite driven. He was about 5 feet 3 inches, with strands of white hair on his temples and a flowing grey beard that weighed him down in the water. He had green eyes and despite his age was strong and one not to be reckoned with.
- Burdekin is the lifemate to Zadori, and father to Shoresprout. He has a mane of red hair framed by a headband of decorative shells. He is a fun loving and playful elf and is devoted to his family, but he is easily influenced and led astray by Sydor. Burdekin is also one of the storytellers to the colony, and takes an active part in festivities.
- Hyfus is one of the rare tailed elves. He has a burnished orange and gold tail, a well-developed torso, long ash blond hair, and green eyes. He is strong and a protector of the colony, and was the acting Crown after Brom's death for the years prior to Raenafel's return. Hyfus was the original soul-mate to Tilaweed with whom he recognised. He is the father to Illora, a Child of Recognition, who was stolen from the WaveDancers.
- Inkbottom is the half brother to Sleia, and his parents are Shoseabee and Kadva. He is a squirt with large pointy ears and big blue eyes, and is a leader rather than follower. Inkbottom is occasionally led astray by Shoresprout, but he is a sensitive little elf with potentially good telepathic abilities which would have emerged in subsequent series. He tends to err on the side of caution. Inkbottom gets his name from the birthmark in the shape of an octopus on his buttock.
- Illora is a Child of Recognition who was stolen when she was a small child. She is the daughter of Tilaweed and Hyfus, and has a small pixieish face with long ears in her true form, and is quite distorted and grotesque in her altered form. She wears a head covering of polished coral to cover a bald head and has aqua-marine eyes. Illora was brought up with Shardon under Sydor's cruel hand, but she shares a love of music with her mother.
- Irralee: A young elf on the brink of fertility and sexuality, Irralee has long port wine coloured hair and one amber eye and one green eye. She sometimes stands alone from the rest of the WaveDancers, but is very giving and generous. She holds an adoration for Sydor and recognises a special quality within him that is attractive to her, but that she can't seem to pinpoint.
- Jormak is slightly taller than his younger brother Barmek. He has long coal-black hair that is tightly drawn back and threaded through seashells giving it the appearance of a long braid. His eyes are a deep golden-brown and quite piercing. Jormak has a strong and powerful physique which he maintains through disciplined sporting activities. He tends to be self-absorbed and has complete disregard for the values and feelings of others. He is very much into the physical, not given to contemplation or development of his inner resources. He is the lead hunter with a fascination for inventing weapons for defence and conquest. He is cunning and shrewd and can be manipulative at times, and certainly not be laughed at for it would raise his wrath. With dark rugged looks and an intense sexual aggression, he is popular with many of the WaveDancers. His sire is Rhialdor, and his mother is Kirith.
- Kadva is one of the Storytellers in the WaveDancer colony and is a traditionalist. He is the life-mate of Shoseabee and father of Inkbottom. He wears a brown loin cloth and seaweed bindings on his calves and forearms. He has black and brown hair that rises to a point at each side of his head near his pointed ears. Kadva has marine blue eyes.
- Kirith is slightly smaller and rounder than the average WaveDancer. She has long hair bundled up for practical purposes into a hair net, and her tail is green. Her skin is the colour of pearls and she has huge brown eyes. She possess the wisdom and teaching of the dolphins behind her and shares a special relationship with them. Though she is a third generation WaveDancer, she is one of the elders. She is also known as the "birthing mother" by the others as she is the midwife to the colony. Kirith can be spirited and frisky, but is also responsible: she was entrusted by Brom to look after and educate Raenafel which she achieved with the utmost care and secrecy. Rhialdor is Kirith's lifemate, and she is the mother of Jormak and Barmek.
- Korillia is quite tall for a WaveDancer, about 6 feet including her tentacles. In some ways she is a freak in the colony because of her hybrid form: half WaveDancer and half octopus (she is the victim of a patch of bad magic when her mother was pregnant with her). Korillia has a mop of red curly hair and violet eyes. Her tail is crimson with pink/purple suckers. Her tentacles have given her a purpose in the colony: she is the cook and has a special talent for turning anything in the ocean into foodstuff for the elves (except for octos with which she has an affinity). Korillia is quite temperamental and is a perfectionist. She has been known to cry into her cooking shells at times when she doesn't get her way. Korillia is a second born, but is barren. The squirts in the colony like to tease and play tricks on her.
- Lazik has brown hair and large blue eyes, and is one of the storytellers in the WaveDancer community. He is a naive elf with good intentions, so he is easily influenced by Sydor. Lazik is good with undersea plants and can often be found tending gardens of seaweed. He uses these plants for medicinal purposes and also supplies Rhialdor with appropriate weed which can be dried out and used for making garments. Lazik and Shoseabee are Slea's parents.
- Maron is one of the fourth generation elves, and is slight in build but quite sporty and adventurous. He has his white/grey hair tied in braids, and has distinct black eyebrows and large blue eyes. He is adventurous of spirit, and is the partner of Paffa. Maron is the head storyteller in the WaveDancer community, and also the sire of Zadori.
- Paffa has black crimpy hair with a white streak down the middle, brown eyes and a very masculine jawline and thick neck. He has the physique of an athlete, and is an excellent hunter. Paffa is the brother of Irralee and is very protective of her as well as Maron, his partner. He has a good sense of humour, loves life and food. He is also a forward thinker and a risk taker if it is in the best interests of the WaveDancer community.
- Raenafel is a fourth generation WaveDancer and is destined to be the fourth Crown by her birthright. Brom and Ailsa are Raenafel's parents, and she was born a Child of Recognition. She stands taller than the average female WaveDancer, and can look most male elves in the eye. She has extremely long thick hair the colour of midnight, and her plush deep purple eyes are doe-like in appearance. In contrast to the other elves, Raenafel is a babe in the woods and knows nothing of the world except for what she learn from Brom's, Kirith's and No-Wing's teachings when she was hidden away. Despite her naivety and her lack of socialisation, she has tremendous powers: healing and flesh-shaping. Raenafel is a natural leader and does not shirk at the threat of danger, and she takes her role as the next Crown very seriously.
- Rhialdor is the lifemate of Kirith and sire of Barmek and Jormak. He is a pacifist by nature, and takes on the role of clown or court jester within the community. He has long hair the colour of burnt umber tied up in a plait, and brown eyes and thick black eyebrows. He is a garment maker for the rest of the WaveDancers. Rhialdor is the lifemate of Kirith.
- Shoresprout is the rambunctious but adorable daughter of Burdekin and Zadori and a seventh generation WaveDancer. She has orange hair and lime green eyes, and wears a tunic to match. Her best friend is Inkbottom who is just a little younger than her, and she is definitely the leader of the two. She can be quite mischievous and spirited, and is not averse to getting into trouble. Shoresprout can also be quite dramatic, and loves the re-enactment of the WaveDancer history by the rest of the Storytellers.
- Shoseabee is quite an exotic elf with large almond shaped brown eyes, a snub nose and short golden hair. She is one of the Storytellers to the clan and loves to dance. She is easily influenced and doesn't think things through, and is perhaps a trifle frivolous. Shoseabee has two lovemates and a child to each of them: Lazik, who is the father of Sleia and Kadva, who is the sire of Inkbottom. Shoseabee is a fourth generation WaveDancer.
- Sleia is the daughter of Lazik and Shoseabee, and half sister to Inkbottom. She has a well-toned body for a female elf and is shorter than the average WaveDancer. She has crystal blue eyes and light sandy-brown hair which she keeps braided. She has a square jaw, a broad nose and strong forehead. Sleia is not known as a pretty elf, but what she lacks in looks is made up tenfold in courage and personality. She can be wilful and cheeky, and is very nimble. She is Barmek's best friend, and is loyal, honesty and trustworthy. Quiet and a little reserved around most of the others, she blossoms into a gregarious and delightful personality when she is adventuring with Barmek. She can be humorous, outgoing and talkative and is the more practical of the two. Sleia can move with great stealth, and is very comfortable with her body and her sporting prowess.
- Sydor (also known as Rydos, his name rearranged) is the High One, is very tall and gangly in appearance. He has cobalt blue eyes and his hair is frosted creme. He is silent and lethal in his actions, and is a dark character who has split inside himself. He lives in secrecy waiting patiently for the time when he can change all and sundry into their original forms and return to the skies in the palace. He mismanages his magic, and uses his flesh-shaping abilities to inflict pain on the innocent even though he is convinced that he is doing the right thing. Sydor also has the ability to black send and to create a bubble around him that refracts light and therefore appears invisible under water.
- Tentus is the only first generation elf still alive in the WaveDancer colony, and possesses the ability of rock/coral shaping. He is the younger brother of Neama, and the child of Ausra and Desh. He is medium in height and has a receding hairline of white hair, bushy eyebrows and his skin has a jaundiced look to it as if it has been stretched over bone. His most prominent features are his grey eyes that look as if they have cataracts. He is somewhat eccentric, a little cranky and impatient because all he wants is to be left alone. His function is the colony is that of historian and he sculpts coral statues of the ancestors and their stories in the Chamber of Remembrance. Tentus is a strong sender and receiver. When the threat of the Soul Stealer is upon them, he can sense it through nightmares which leave him drained, sick and helpless.
- Tilaweed is one of the oldest mer-elves in the WaveDancer colony. She is about 5 foot 10 inches with her tail. She carries herself with dignity as if she is of royal birth, but this is a natural quality rather than a false persona. She has long golden blonde hair and large ice blue eyes, and wears a girdle and head-dress of pearls and shells. Her tail is a green blue with some pink through her fin. She possesses many great talents. She is a musician: she has a beautiful lyrical voice that can soothe the soul and lull the mind, but she rarely chooses to sing because she mourns for her lost Child of Recognition. Tilaweed is estranged from her soul-mate Hyfus. She is a loner and tends to be secretive, but her glamorous facade hides her sensitivity and pain. Tilaweed spends her time equally above and below water though she can never venture on land because of her tail.
- Zadori is the mother of Shoresprout and the lovemate of Burdekin. She is also the daughter of Maron and is a sixth generation WaveDancer. Even though she is quite young, she is a traditionalist not given to forward thinking. Zadori is long, sleek and sensuous, and has silver white hair and blue eyes. She is also one of the Storytellers in the community.

== Elves of other or unknown tribes ==
- Ekuar (male, rockshaper): Part of an ancient group of elves (probably of the second generation), he was captured by trolls and used for his rockshaping skills, with dismemberment serving as punishment for disobedience; thus he lacks an arm, a leg, and several fingers. He is a mentor, adviser and father figure to Rayek.
- Mekda (female, rockshaper, deceased): Part of an ancient group of elves (second generation or thereabouts), she was captured by trolls and used for her rockshaping skills, with dismemberment serving as punishment for disobedience. After several centuries, she became little more than a mindless tool, named Sack-o'-Bones. She is finally employed by Guttlekraw to force his way into the Go-Back's lodge and strike at their children; she was afterwards found by Ekuar, dead from cold exposure.
- Osek (male, rockshaper, deceased): Part of an ancient group of elves (second generation or thereabouts), he was captured by trolls and used for his rockshaping skills, but managed to escape into the desert surrounding Sorrow's End. His final act was shaping a niche in a sheer cliff wall, to crawl in and die. This niche was later found by Suntop through his magic sense.
- Teir (male, of Go-Back, Wolfrider, and Glider descent): Teir is an elf with prodigious skills in animal bonding. He is lifemated to the new Wolfrider chief Ember, after a long, difficult competition with her lovemate Mender and although the couple has since Recognized, they have chosen to postpone having a child until they feel they are ready. His appearance is similar to the famed meeting of Chieftess Huntress Skyfire and her lifemate Dreamsinger, who they both physically resemble in kind. It was recently revealed that Teir is, in fact, the son of deceased Go-Back chieftess Kahvi and her lovemate Tyldak's son, Windkin, whom she had asked to sire a child on her after the death of his father; this, in effect, makes Teir grandson to Dewshine, great-grandson to Treestump, and second and third cousin to Cutter and twins Ember and Sunstream, respectively. He has long black hair with many braids and feathers, and gray eyes.

== Half troll, half elf ==
- Two-Edge: Son of Winnowill, an elf, and Smelt, a troll, he became a master blacksmith, but is mentally crippled by his abused childhood at the hands of his mother. He had an unusual interest, possibly romantic, in Venka, Rayek's daughter, referring to her as his "maiden". Though he heavily resembles a troll with broad, heavy features, he is more muscular than his pure counterparts, and bears no warts or rounded nose. He is unusually dextrous for a troll, and was the forger of the infamous New Moon, Cutter's sword. He has pointed ears and the ability to send, a gift awakened by Leetah previous to events of The Siege of Blue Mountain, in an attempt to heal his madness. He recently became lovemates with Ahdri, who is helping him explore his elfin side. He has white-gray hair.

== High Ones ==
At least eight High Ones survived the primitive humans' slaughter after their Palace crashed on the World of Two Moons:

- Aerth: A lovemate of Timmain, a healer and possible ancestor of Leetah, he helped raise Timmorn alongside Sefra. With auburn hair and green eyes, he was the Circle of the Nine's Ears, deciding why they would go.
- Deir: Lifemate of Gibra and father of Vol, he offered to accompany Gibra on her quest to find Haken, but she rejected this offer and left him with the other High Ones. He had short red hair.
- Gibra: Mother of Vol, her son with Deir, her lifemate, she was the Caution in the Circle of the Nine, holding them back. She had blonde hair and blue eyes. She went after Haken after his banishment, hoping baby Vol would turn his heart to good. Although Vol has a similar name to Lord Voll of the Gliders, Richard Pini has stated that they are not the same elf.
- Haken: Timmain's nemesis and a possible ancestor of Winnowill or Rayek, he wanted to conquer the humans. He was Gibra's opposite, Passion, pushing them forward. He regained use of powerful magic in a fairly short time after the crash, displaying the ability levitate, shape, and transmute matter, as well as shapeshifting himself. He was mutilated and banished by Timmain. It is not known what became of him. He had black hair, dark skin, and yellow eyes.
- Kalil: A possible lovemate of Kaslen, with brown hair and eyes, he appears as a gentler tempered version of Strongbow. He refuses to sing with the rest of the Circle after they crash, but agrees to keep time by beating out rhythm.
- Kaslen: A female treeshaper, possible lovemate of Kalil, it was her broken arm that started the conflict between Timmain and Haken. She is possible ancestor of Redlance, and has long red-orange and green eyes.
- Sefra: A female Timekeeper of the Circle of the Nine, and close friend of Timmain's. Sefra is the first stargazer, and a probable ancestor of Skywise and Shale. She has silver hair and eyes.
- Timmain: With Aerth, mother of an unnamed daughter, and with an unnamed wolf the mother of Timmorn Yellow-Eyes, with Skywise the mother of Jink, Timmain was the only High One to learn to adapt to the world, and mother of the Wolfriders. She is the last surviving High One, after spending millennia in wolf form, and is now Recognized and lifemated to Skywise.

In addition, the names of several of the slain High Ones are known:

- Adya: A close friend of Timmain, he was the first to try to make contact with the humans, and the first to be killed. He had blond hair and blue eyes. He was their Eyes, seeing where the Circle of the Nine would go. Timmain stated that if she had chosen a lifemate, he would have been hers.
- Guin was killed during the humans' first assault, and is a close friend of Haken's.
- Ima was killed during the humans' first assault.
- Orolin tended the Scroll of Colors within the Palace, and was wrapped in a Preserver cocoon. According to Timmain, his Preserver cocoon ripped during the crash, and he eventually died without ever waking.
- Tislin was killed during the humans' first assault.

Even more elves, such as Rellah, Enlet, Almeck, Nefahrin, Menolan, Seeree, Oraynah, Marreck, and Jennah are mentioned in the non-canonical Blood Of Ten Chiefs collaboration novels, edited by Richard Pini.

== Preserver ==
Preservers are mentioned by the original High Ones to be the descendants of some sort of goodnatured insect or bug-like creature, that evolved for the better with their influence. They are immortal and cannot reproduce, but seem to be entirely indestructible except for their colorful wings. They are famed for their inherent ability to produce "wrapstuff", a weblike material that renders those completely cocooned into a timeless sleep state until the webbing is torn.

- Petalwing is a notoriously poor singer, and by virtue of its (preservers don't have a gender) big mouth, their de facto leader. It follows the "highthings" in order to protect them, since they refuse its constant offerings to be put into safe "wrapstuff". Petalwing was the only Preserver to stay on the World of Two Moons when the Palace departed, preferring to do so to take care of the Wolfriders.
- Tittersweet
- Berrybuzz
- Bitterscreech
- Willowsnap
- Littlesky
- Bumbleclaw
- Tickletoe
- No-Wing was the only preserver mentioned as having gone with the forebears of the Wavedancers in the original, now non-canonical Wavedancers series. It accompanied Raenafel on her journey to the Palace and placed her in wrapstuff when she became too weak from dehydration to continue. It stood guard over her until she was found by Sleia and Barmek, then placed Barmek in wrapstuff when he was injured. No-Wing was primary companion of the old rock-shaper Tentus.

== Trolls ==
Trolls are immortal, brought by the original High Ones as 'pets'. Their evolution was not a pleasant one, and they became ape-like, childish creature with a penchant for cruelty. It is the fault of Trolls that the Palace crashed. Their descendants are much larger and more intelligent, the latter by barely.

=== Greymung's Trolls (Holt Trolls) ===
- Greymung was king of the Holt Trolls after refusing to leave at the command of Guttlekraw, rebelling and driving him and his followers away. He was killed when Guttlekraw's force returned in force years later. Greymung was the facilitator of the Original Quest when he tricked Cutter and his Wolfriders into the desert in the hopes of killing them once and for all.
- Old Maggoty is the oldest known Troll, knowledgeable in herbal lore, Oddbit's granny and great granny of Trinket. She is rumored to be an old concubine of Guttlekraw when she was young. She is much more levelheaded than her fellow female Trolls, and interacts well with elves. She was one of a handful of trolls to accompany the elves in the Palace when it departed the World of Two Moons.
- Oddbit: A maiden who is an opportunist of considerable enterprise, and the love interest of Picknose, she has been a concubine of both Greymung and Guttlekraw. Assumed mother of Trinket and many others, she has shown pity to elve's "stupidity" and "ugliness" on more than one occasion. She is extraordinarily self-centered, even for a Troll and is highly promiscuous. She has curly blonde hair.
- Picknose: A soldier of the Holt Trolls, he was one of the few to escape when the colony was invaded. He was told of a treasure trove to which a key in the hilt of Cutter's sword provided access. After failing to gain the key, he and his companions went up north anyway to find the treasure and were caught and enslaved in the attempt. When the Wolfriders and Go-Backs invaded the tunnels of Guttlekraw's realm, they freed Picknose and the other Holt Trolls and formed an alliance that overthrew Guttlekraw and established Picknose as King. He lost the throne while gambling and hooked up with the Wolfriders who eventually allowed him to establish a colony of his own. According to the Pinis, his name comes not from any unsavory habit but from the fact that his nose resembles a pickaxe.
- Scurff (also known as Scurfball) is a King Greymung's doorkeeper. He tried to prevent the Wolfriders from entering the caverns when the Holt was burned down, but was "persuaded" to let them in by Cutter.
- Trinket is a daughter of Oddbit and Picknose. She has a strange liking for elves, especially Mender, whom she has a huge crush on. She was taken by Rayek in the palace. As a result, even though she is the first-born daughter, all of her siblings and subsequent descendants are significantly older than her. She accompanied Jink and Yun when they went in search of Skywise during Stargazer's Quest and, after meeting a group of trolls on another planet, she decided to stay with them when they invited her to.

=== Guttlekraw's Trolls ===
- King Guttlekraw: An ancient King of the Trolls of Frozen Mountain, he had a fanatical hatred for Elves, possibly encouraged by Two-Edge. This hate extended to keeping rockshaping elves in brutal slavery and worked to permanently seal the Palace of the High Ones from all access. He wears a crown of elf fingers taken from captives, and it is hinted that he has eaten elf flesh. He was going to torture the Go-Back, Vaya, for the elves' secrets, but she made an attempt on his life and was executed. He was defeated and killed at the hands of the Go-Backs, Wolfriders and the Holt Trolls, and was devoured by their wolf companions.
- Itchback is a young, overconfident Troll warrior. When the Wolfriders and Go-Backs invade Guttlekraw's realm, he brashly attacks them and is killed before he can lay his hands on them.

=== Picknose's Trolls ===
- Drub is one of Picknose and Oddbit's daughters, and sister to Flam, with whom she is implied to have an incestuous relationship. She accompanied Cutter's group of elves during the Shards series.
- Flam is one of Picknose and Oddbit's sons, and brother to Drub, with whom he is implied to have an incestuous relationship. He accompanied Cutter's group of elves during the Shards series. He is best friends with Mender, chiefly due to their common temperament.
- Mungwart is one of Picknose and Oddbit's sons. He is killed along with two unnamed Trolls while defending his home from Grohmul Djun's men.

=== Other Trolls ===
- Unnamed Firstcomer Troll: Cutter and Two-Edge discovered that one of the last of the trolls that caused the Palace of the High Ones to crash land on the World of Two Moons thousands of years ago was still alive and had been reluctantly crowned king by trolls who formerly served Guttlekraw and Picknose. When the elves found him, it was Leetah who realized that the troll was in very poor health and was dying. When the troll stated that his wish was to go back to the elves and trolls' homeworld, he was invited to come to the Palace and be welcomed by elves and trolls alike. He was nursed back to health by Leetah and Old Maggoty, then welcomed into the Palace by Timmain. With a handful of trolls, including Old Maggoty, his wish to go back to his homeworld was granted.

== Humans ==
=== Stone Age ===
This list includes the original series, Blood of Ten Chiefs, Wolfrider, and some short stories.

- Adar is Nonna's husband and a member of Olbar's tribe. Banished for taking a wife from another tribe, he later returned and persuaded Olbar to take them back with a little help from the "spirits" Cutter and Skywise. He is loosely based on Richard Pini.
- Aro is a survivor from the fire set in the "Green Growing Place" who happened upon Sorrows End in a desperate bid for food and water along with his son, wife and brother.
- Azak
- Bakta
- Bone Woman is a shaman to Olbar's tribe who used bones for scrying. She was eventually cast out for her plotting against Nonna and Adar and the Elves.
- Bruga (male)
- Buruk: While out in the woods one day Buruk, out of jealousy and hatred, attacked fellow hunter Krat and left him for dead, but Krat slowly crawled back to the village and, according to Buruk, lived long enough to condemn him. He was sentenced to burn at the stake, but the fire burned through his ropes and he ran, still on fire, into the woods. He was left hideously scarred by the flames and began hunting his fellow villagers out of revenge. He also decided to hunt the elves too, spending years studying them by disguising himself with wolf musk to hide his scent. In this way, he not only learned the elves' language but also their ways of hunting, skills he used to kidnap Redpelt, one of the tribe's cubs, with the intent of torturing him. Redpelt, and thus Buruk, was tracked down by the elf Finder, who killed the human both in self-defense and to keep him from killing Redpelt.
- Chiad G'cho is a Hoan G'Tay Tribe member who went on a secret war with part of the tribe to attack the "Wolf Demons" and helped set fire to the Forbidden Grove. He was captured due to the arrival of Dart's Jack Wolf Riders. He returned to his tribe but was killed by Kureel.
- Demontricker is Mantricker's opposite among Gotara's Chosen, but, eventually, the elf's ally when it came to preventing all-out war between their people. Ironically, hundreds of years later, tales of his exploits would be used by shamans to encourage those of Gotara's Chosen to destroy the "demons".
- Dreeka (male)
- Dro is Aro's brother who went mad following the fire at the Green Growing Place. He died of an apparent heart attack following a confrontation with the elves.
- Ehok is a twin brother of Taf. Both boys considered themselves as Demontricker's heirs, naive to the fatal repercussions of their actions. They ultimately became responsible for the deaths of Skywise's parents, causing their tribe's shaman to sacrifice Taf, a price for overconfidence which Ehok would regret for the rest of his life.
- Elona is a girl who lived during Goodtree's reign, and had a major crush on Mantricker. She later became Demontricker's wife.
- Geoki is a juvenile member of the Hoan G'Tay Sho, Nonna's tribe. He befriends Dart without any prejudice. Both are nearly killed by Kureel and healed by Leetah's efforts.
- Geru (from Olbar's tribe)
- Graysha (female, Olbar's mate)
- Graz (male)
- Kakuk is a Hoan G'Tay Tribesman who went into blue mountain as an offering to the spirits. There he was a servant of Winnowill tasked with singing to her when she was troubled. After she took over Blue Mountain he was one of Winnowill's prisoners.
- Kerthan (male, lived during Twospear's time)
- Klaa (male)
- Kloni (female)
- Kohahn (male, Hoan G'Tay Sho)
- Krat: Very little is known about Krat, except he was one of his village's best hunters. While out hunting one day, he was attacked and left for dead by fellow hunter Buruk. Despite his fatal injuries, Krat managed to crawl back to his village and was barely able to name Buruk as his attacker before succumbing to his wounds.
- Kron (male, lived during Goodtree's time)
- Malak: A young man of Olbar's tribe who failed his trial of manhood and eloped with Olbar's daughter Selah. Olbar and his men pursued them into the Forbidden Grove, but were driven back by Petalwing's band of Preservers. The young lovers thanked the friendly "spirits", which then wrapped them in suspended animation cocoons while they slept. About a year later they were discovered by Cutter, who made good his name by cutting them out, and they left to find a new home.
- Marn is Skar/Sohan's father. Having always hated the elves, when his son Sohan was taken and left scarred by Mantricker, Marn passed that hatred onto his son. Convincing the boy that his scar was a sign from Gotara to destroy all elves, Marn taught his son all the skills he felt would be needed to kill the "demons". Sometime later, Marn died of a heart attack, leaving his son an orphan and an outcast in the village who had to raise himself when no other family would take him in.
- Morri is Skar's wife. Despite his anger and fearful appearance, she fell in love with him, and he with her, when she became the only person capable of calming down his rages. They married and a short time later she gave birth to his son. Some years later, Morri was bitten by an animal infected with foaming sickness (rabies). When she herself died of the disease, it reignited Skar's rage against the elves after he convinced himself they were the ones who sent the rabid animal to kill Morri.
- Nima is one of Nonna's and Adar's adopted children.
- Nonna is a human artist from the Hoan G'Tay Sho tribe who was the first human whom the Wolfriders found was sympathetic to them. She lives with her husband, Adar, who is commemorated in the Wolfriders' Howls, and are the only humans so honoured. She is loosely based on Wendy Pini herself.
- Olbar the Mountain-Tall is a leader of a village of Humans renowned for his great size, and one of the first in his tribe to respect the Elves as equals. He is first seen in the Elfquest sidebar story "Homespun" in Epic Illustrated.
- Little Patch is a human adopted by Tyleet as a baby after his parents had abandoned him in the wild because of a large red birthmark on his face, which also gave him his name. He became the first human to live among the Wolfriders, but later left them and rejoined his parents' tribe, eventually becoming their chief. Just before his death of old age, he returns to the Wolfriders' holt and dies in Tyleet's arms.
- Riven Fire-Mouth (later God-Talker) is a female Shaman of the tribe that later became the Hoan G'Tay Sho, and is the first human to make contact with the Gliders of Blue Mountain.
- Rovin (male)
- Selah is Olbar's daughter and a lover of Malak. Rumor has it that Malak and Selah were based on a couple the Pinis knew.
- Shan is Skar's son, and was orphaned when his mother died of foaming sickness and his father committed suicide. Like his father, Shan had no other relatives to take him in. Because he felt sorry for the boy and he did not want history to repeat itself, Demontricker took Shan in and raised him as his son, teaching him to respect the "demons" and to encourage peace between the village and elves. By the time Shan became a village elder, his foster father's exploits had become legendary, so he would often regale the village children with tales of Demontricker, along with lessons of living in peace with the "demons".
- Sohan/Skar: As a child, he was held hostage by Mantricker and left physically and emotionally scarred by the encounter, resulting in a lifelong obsession to destroy the "demons". This obsession made him an outcast in the village, although he married and fathered a son. After his wife died of the foaming sickness, he held Demontricker's own wife hostage to force him to find Mantricker and pass along Skar's challenge. As Mantricker died years before, he ended up fighting Bearclaw instead. When Skar lost the fight, he felt that with his vengeance gone he had nothing left to live for and took his own life.
- Spirit Man is a shaman for Gotara's Chosen. In his religious fanaticism, he set the Holt ablaze in retaliation for a previous battle with the Wolfrider and was killed for it.
- Tabak is the Spirit Man's apprentice, and was killed by Cutter to prevent him from sacrificing Redlance. His death led to the destruction of the Holt.
- Taf is a twin brother of Ehok. Both boys considered themselves as Demontricker's heirs, naive to the fatal repercussions of their actions. They ultimately became responsible for the deaths of Skywise's parents, causing their tribe's shaman to sacrifice Taf.
- Tenchi is one of Nonna's and Adar's adopted children.
- Thaya
- Thief: A man whose original name was stripped from him by his brother Olbar as punishment for some serious crime. He conspired with Bone Woman to murder Cutter and Skywise for the lodestone. After he claimed a new name - Spiritslayer - he was killed by Cutter.
- Tolf the Wood-Cleaver is Adar's father.
- Yokut (male)

=== Forevergreen ===
The stories told in "New Blood 11ff" and "Fire Eye" in Elfquest II:

- Ahn-Lai, later called Ahnn-Li (male)
- Aramak (male) is "attained father" (chief or priest-king) of the Hungtsho, the humans living in the Forevergreen.
- Auroa (female)
- Bailon (male)
- Balam (male)
- Bren (male)
- Brienne (female)
- Cam Triompe (male, Hearthstone): An ally of the elf Jethel and the Forevergreen human children.
- Fleeg
- Ge-O'Ka is the son of the tyrant Aramak, and sides with the elves after learning the origin of his name.
- Gillie (female)
- Jahri (male)
- Jooka (male): Servant of the Ahnessa.
- Kamut (male)
- Karcha (male)
- Kin-chi (male)
- Malana (female)
- Marish (male)
- Pei-Lar: Originally an enemy of Suntop and his friends as they go to rescue Windkin, she is the leader of a rebellion against the government of Aramak and his elf-cult; it is suggested that she lost a son to his child sacrifices. She has thick white blonde hair.
- Quaila (male)
- Squarr (male)
- Wanderer (male)
- Yahan (male)

=== Middle ages ===
Humans in the 'New Land' (known to humans as Junsland), mostly in the storyline Shards, but also in some short stories.

- Atvon Grang (male)
- Bolli is Woodcutter's wife, no great believer in spirits, and she is cautious about Tyleet dining with them. After Woodcutter is taken away she tells Tyleet and Skywise and asks them to bring Woodcutter back to her.
- Broden'Hull (male)
- Donmahr (male)
- Grennetch (male)
- Grohmul Djun is an overlord of the known World of Two Moons who sought to conquer Abode. He greatly desired Lady Venovel (Winnowill), but found himself unable to touch her. He also desired Venka, but was thwarted and betrayed by the infatuated half troll Two-Edge, also his master builder. His empire crumbled when the Elves regained their palace (as recorded in the Shards series) and, in exile, he is later killed by his own son Angrif.
- Karkapetch (male)
- Ladlopp (male)
- Padki is Woodcutter's and Bolli's child, and was saved by Tyleet when he was threatened by a rat that nearly crawled into his crib.
- Rulnk (male)
- Shuna is rebel fighter and daughter of one of the Djun's best men, inspired at a young age by Leetah, who healed her of a terrible disease when she was small. She became a trusted ally of the elves when she helped then regain the palace shards and saved Strongbow's life by allowing him to shoot a rope arrow through her hand while he was falling. She is later adopted by Cutter and Leetah after the deaths of her human parents. She was later married first to the abusive Nunkah, then her friend Bee. She became a "bridge" between humans and elves, teaching each side how to respect the other. She was later known as Shaman Shuna by the humans and had her life extended several times by Leetah, and became the first human to be able to send like the elves. In the Stargazer's Quest storyline, it is explained that after several hundred years, Shuna decided she had lived long enough and asked the "good spirits" (most likely Leetah) to remove her immortality. Shuna then started aging again and lived out her life, dying of natural causes.
- Shuna's Father is a brutal and opportunistic mercenary in Grohmul Djun's employ. He first attempted to use Leetah's healing powers for his own gain, which was foiled by Leetah and Skywise. During the Shards storyline, he longed to become Saddle Chief, a military rank similar to cavalry captain. When Shuna spoiled his plan to use his next elven captive, Tyleet, for personal gain and subsequently fled his wrath, he beat his wife to death when he found out that she'd been secretly assisting her daughter. He was accidentally killed by Grohmul Djun during the decisive uprising of Djun's resentful subjects.
- Tomloch (male)
- Vort'Chust (male)
- The Woodcutter believed in 'good tree spirits'. Befriended by Tyleet, it was his forced labor for the Djun that helped encourage action on part of the elves.
- Yengchuk is a soldier of the Djun's army who steals some shards but is caught. One of his eyes is removed as punishment.
- Lady Venovel is Winnowill's human disguise.

=== Wild Hunt ===
The tales of Ember's tribe up to and including Recognition.

- Abtrag
- Anamara (female; Longrider)
- Androw is one of Lehrigen's men on the hunt for Ember's elves, approximately 19–20 years old with a black braid. He was seduced by the elf Dewshine, who summarily hung him upside down without his clothes as a warning to the humans.
- Angrif Djun is the only son of Grohmul Djun, and valued somewhat for it. Despite his penchant for arrogancy, it is his gender that often saves him from his father's own sword or fist. Despite his tongue, he values his father's opinion and steals from the Wild Hunt in order to bring back a prize. This leads to his sister Gifa's journey to the Wild Hunt, to which he very much opposes. In retaliation, he orders her to be ambushed by his own men, beaten and abandoned, to make the infiltration more "realistic". He later kills Gifa to spur the humans against the elves. Soon afterwards he also murders his father. As he got older, he amassed a large army and set about conquering the World of Two Moons, as well as tracking down and killing his father's illegitimate offspring. As he entered the mountains, he heard rumors about the elves living there and infiltrated their holt to kill them once and for all. In the ensuing battle he lost both of his sons and was castrated by Krim shortly before she died. In retaliation, he spent the remaining years of his life (as well as a lot of money and resources) overlooking the building of a large fleet of warships. He lived just long enough to witness the completion of the ships. His skull now adorns the ship that is the head of the fleet.
- Aupa (male; Longrider)
- Beilid (male)
- Bokko (male)
- Cassa (female)
- Cushyuk (male; leader of the Longrider clan)
- Dalan (male; Longrider)
- Diena (female)
- Dob'il (male)
- Durra (male)
- Erghii (male)
- Falz (male)
- Fledarn (male)
- Gifa is the only daughter of Grohmul Djun, and valued all the less for it. She attempts to infiltrate the Wild Hunt with the intention of killing them and gaining her father's favor, but her plan is thwarted by her conscience and upon her escape, she is killed by her brother Angrif to serve his purposes.
- Greenz (male)
- Gretch (male)
- Halu (male)
- Heltu (male)
- Hulda (female)
- Khorbasi is a Longrider orphan adopted by the elf Yun and taken into the Wild Hunt tribe. He is fiercely protective of the Holt and seems to hold a certain distaste for his fellow humans, although he risks his life to save a small group of children when their village is attacked by Angrif Djun's army. Due to an illness, his life was extended by Mender, enabling him to be able to live longer than most humans. In effect, this has made him more like his adopted family than the humans he was born to.
- Khuldalchi (male)
- Korik (male)
- Krois (male)
- Lehrigen is a professional elf hunter who claimed to have killed elves all across Abode, including the Go-Back chief Kahvi. Her death has since been confirmed. He was respected by the elves for his demeanor and loyalty to his allies. He had a dog called Morri he used to hunt them with. He was one of few humans that spoke elvish and called them 'elves'. He kidnapped Dewshine and Pool in order to trade them for the healer Mender. He lived to old age and was killed fighting Angrif Djun and his men. He died alongside the Go-Back Krim, whose eyes he wanted to be his last sight in his life.
- Lodok (male)
- Lozzi (male)
- Mager (male)
- Meryam (female)
- Mindin (male)
- Morisaitai (female)
- Muldav (male)
- Oingovet (male)
- Oot (male)
- Pahx (male)
- Pengawh (male)
- Quinji (male)
- Rathol (male)
- Rowb (male)
- Shikar (male)
- Skwaat (male)
- Stamm (male)
- Stang (male)
- Sunuvaslut (male)
- Tesha
- Uliban (male)
- Veser (male)
- Vinz'ik (male)
- Wach (male)
- Wiesel (male)
- Yalu (male)
- Yan (male)
- Zaris (male)

=== Wavedancers ===
- Ardan Djarum spent years claiming to have come from the future as Grohmul Djun's descendant, but during Final Quest, it was revealed by Angrif Djun that Ardan was, in fact, one of his father's numerous illegitimate offspring. Ardan was captured and tortured by Angrif's men, which drove him further into madness. When Angrif felt he learned all he needed to know about the "demons", he shot and killed his half-brother using a pistol Ardan had stolen to further his claim.
- Bran Porak (male)
- Ellia is the first wife of Ardan Djarum. She was familiar with the streets folklore and the legends born around her husband's supposed ancestor, Grohmul Djun. Ellia believed the spirits (elves) were good, and her words angered Ardan so much that he slapped her, breaking her neck. Her memory, whom he blamed on the elves, haunted him for years.
- Djarum junior is the son of Ardan Djarum and a "loveless wife" he married some time after Ellia. A man in his thirties or forties, he shared his father's intense hatred of elves. He was killed by Surge.
- Liff is a Hungtsho boy and a son of Marish.
- Marish is Hungtsho farmer in whose home the Wavedancer elf Wavelet lives, and is father of Liff. Marish's great-grandfather rescued the infant elf Wavelet after the newborn's tribe was massacred by humans, and Wavelet has lived with five generations of her human family ever since.
- Meesh (male)
- Murlon
- Perith
- Tarf (male)

=== Rogue's Curse ===
These stories take place some hundred years after Shards.

- Adda (male)
- Ariana (female)
- Bel (female)
- Bruck (male)
- Brundle (male)
- Buudji (female)
- Corena (female)
- Cressi is a prostitute/waitress who offers her services to the elf Rayek in exchange for rescuing her from a bad customer. The spirit of Winnowill encouraged him to accept, only to burn her face when they touched.
- Faldar (male)
- Finalla Retsdotter (female)
- Gui (female)
- Haryk (male)
- Hebron (male)
- Jone (female)
- Kristoff (male)
- Laruse (male)
- Loyla (female)
- Mada Shaya (female)
- Melaan (female)
- Moni (male)
- Nari Addason (male)
- Quintoc (male)
- Ressha
- Ret Addason (male)
- Rondol
- Runstoll (male)
- Sarloff
- Shed
- Sherla is a human psychic who managed to withdraw Winnowill from Rayek long enough for him to defeat two of her mutants. She was consumed by Winnowill and Rayek was forced to destroy her shell. Rayek called her a "brave, beautiful child" and was hinted to hold romantic feelings for her.
- Tarn "the Titanic" (male)
- Thegan Amuthson (male)
- Tomlin (male)
- Valbor (male)

=== FutureQuest ===
Includes the series The Rebels and Jink, which take place about 900 years after the restoration of the Palace, and their continuation in the second Elfquest magazine (Elfquest II) between 1996 and 1999.

- Baranaco Chirell (male)
- Barin (male)
- Belroyd Zuhn (male)
- Bernhar
- Blare
- Brinna (female)
- Brogham (male)
- Cala Saardotar (female)
- Cartisan (female)
- Cassie (female)
- Chandra Davenkee (female)
- Cosmo Luricahn (male)
- Dr. Conglio (male)
- Criante (female)
- Crim (male)
- D'lange (female)
- Elan Junnard (male)
- Ephra Traji (female)
- Faun (female)
- Frix Chirell (male)
- Gerrano
- Gestrelle Luricahn (female)
- G'Kahrii S'ha (female, of Hearthstone descent) is a psychopathic terrorist who wanted to annihilate the city of Cauldron.
- Graaf (female)
- Gran (male; Spacer)
- Grodans (male)
- Gyn Bellambara (female)
- Halm Junnard (male)
- Helm
- Homantes Taon (male)
- Imeliar L'cota (male, of Hearthstone descent)
- Jak (male)
- Jerrod Anaken (male)
- Jock (male)
- Jodano (male)
- Jonost (male)
- Kellum Luricahn
- Kimur (male, Spacer)
- Kinar
- Kralt (female)
- Kullyn Kenn (male)
- Laren (male)
- Lokan (male)
- Marger
- Marya Xanian Oth, Doma (female)
- Merton (male)
- Mikkan (male)
- Mirk, later Nurem (male, Spacer)
- Mora (female)
- M'wembe
- Nikerra (female)
- Nohlam Junnard (male)
- Nuriham (female)
- Pel Rikkar (male)
- Polis (male)
- Quaino (male)
- Raff (male)
- Ravya (female)
- Rolan (male)
- Rosie (female human-preserver hybrid)
- Roul (male)
- Sa'ar Kel Tarik (male)
- Saryn (female)
- Scorch Chirell (male)
- Selphin
- Sevine (female)
- Shayalla Beneir (female)
- Shifra Chirell (female)
- Shimmer (technically male mechanoid)
- Shra (female)
- Starwell Pyot (male)
- Stint (female)
- Straya (female, Spacer)
- Tal Chirell (male)
- Tamia Korhat (female)
- Tamul Djun (deceased; mentioned as a historical figure)
- Taranca (a poet quoted several times)
- Tebo (male, from Harveston)
- Thera Seele (female)
- Thilar Path Miomonde (female)
- Threll (male)
- Tivah Junnard (female)
- Tollibet (male)
- Tomi (male, from Harveston)
- Torlon Graaf (male, of Hearthstone descent)
- Traia (female, Spacer)
- Vargon Ghorst (male)
- Vendiva (female)
- Verown (male)
- Voleu Corcana (female)
- Whend'elle (female)
- Xono Kalik (male)

== Monsters ==
- Madcoil is a murderous monster accidentally created when a wildcat and a large snake, locked in mortal combat, disturbed a pool of decayed magic that was also hit with lightning at that exact moment. That combination of elements created the monster with a senseless lust for murder using its massive size, claws and psionic powers to confuse its prey to its advantage. It attacked both the human colonies and the Wolfriders, causing numerous deaths before it was defeated and killed by the elves under Cutter's leadership. Regardless, the humans accused the elves of deliberately creating the creature to bedevil them. It was later revealed that the mutual hatred between Bearclaw and a human chief had partially reawakened the spell and fueled the monster's rage.
