= List of American comics =

There is the list of American comics, by publishing company in the bellow.

== A ==
- Abstract Studio
  - Strangers in Paradise by Terry Moore
  - Echo by Terry Moore
  - Rachel Rising by Terry Moore
  - Motor Girl by Terry Moore
- AC Comics
- Antarctic Press
- Ape Entertainment
  - Pocket God by Allan Dye and Dave Castelnuovo
  - Goblin Chronicles by Troy Dye, Tom Kelesides, and Collin Fogel
- Arcana Studio
  - All Fall Down by Casey Jones
- Archie Comics
- Archaia Studios Press
  - Berona's War
  - Critical Millennium

== B ==
- Basement Comics
- Beyond Comics
  - Gekido by Graig Weich & B. Wilson
  - Code Name: Justice by Graig Weich
  - Ravedactyl by Graig Weich
  - Justice by Graig Weich
  - Gekido vs. Code Name: Justice by Graig Weich & B. Wilson
- Blue Juice Comics
  - The Accelerators by RFI Porto and Gavin Smith
  - Aether & Empire by Mike Horan and Bong Ty Dazo
  - Anne Bonnie by Tim Yates

== C ==
- Cellar Door Publishing
  - Minister Jade
- Centaur Publications
- Charlton Comics

== D ==
- DC Comics
- Dark Horse
- Devil's Due
- Dumbbell Press
  - Max Rep in the Age of Astrotitans

== E ==
- EC Comics
- Eclipse Comics
- Evil Ink Comics
  - Kill Audio
- Evil Twin Comics
  - Action Philosophers!

== F ==
- Fantagraphics Books
  - Acme Novelty Library by Chris Ware
  - Eightball by Daniel Clowes
  - Frank by Jim Woodring
  - Hate by Peter Bagge
  - Love and Rockets by Jaime Hernandez and Gilbert Hernandez
  - Naughty Bits by Roberta Gregory
  - Palestine by Joe Sacco
- Fenickx Productions LLC
  - Archaic
- First Comics
- Flat World Knowledge
  - Atlas Black: Managing to Succeed

== G ==
- Gilberton Publications
  - Classics Illustrated

== H ==
- Harris Comics
- Harvey Comics
- Hermes Press

== I ==
- IDW Publishing
- Image Comics

== L ==
- Laizen Comics
  - The Dreamhoppers
  - Comics Revue
  - Modesty Blaise Quarterly

== M ==
- Marvel Comics

Mad Cave Studios

Creator of smash hit Honor And Curse

- Mirage Studios
  - Bade Biker & Orson by Jim Lawson
  - Barabbas by Dan Vado and Gino Atanasio
  - Bioneers by A.C. Farley
  - Commandosaurs by Peter Laird
  - Dino Island by Jim Lawson
  - Fugitoid by Kevin Eastman and Peter Laird
  - Gizmo by Michael Dooney
  - Gobbledygook by various artists
  - Grunts by various artists
  - Gutwallow by Dan Berger
  - Hallowieners: Invasion of the Halloween Hot Dogs by Ryan Brown
  - Hero Sandwich
  - Melting Pot by Kevin Eastman and Eric Talbot
  - Mirage Mini-Comics
  - Paleo by Jim Lawson
  - Planet Racers by Peter Laird and Jim Lawson
  - Plastron Cafe by various artists
  - Prime Slime Tails
  - The Puma Blues by Stephen Murphy and Michael Zulli
  - Rockola by Ryan Brown
  - Stupid Heroes by Peter Laird
  - Teenage Mutant Ninja Turtles and related titles by Kevin Eastman and Peter Laird
  - Usagi Yojimbo (volume 2) and related titles by Stan Sakai
  - Wild West C.O.W.-Boys of Moo Mesa by Ryan Brown
  - Xenotech by Michael Dooney

== N ==
- NASA
  - First Woman
- New England Comics
  - The Tick
  - Paul the Samurai
  - Man-Eating Cow
  - Chainsaw Vigilante

== O ==
- Oni Press

== P ==
- Pacific Comics
- Poison Press
  - Cavalcade of Boys

== R ==
- Red Giant Entertainment
  - Amped by Bryan Augustyn
  - Arena: Earth
  - Banzai Girl
  - The Blood Conspiracy
  - Buzzboy
  - Catie & Josephine
  - Crow Scare
  - Dante
  - Drowtales
  - Duel Identity
  - Exposure
  - The First Daughter
  - God Mode
  - Greylore
  - Jade Warriors
  - Journey To Magika
  - Kat
  - Katrina
  - Last Blood
  - Legends of the Stargrazers
  - Lizzie
  - Medusa's Daughter
  - Midnight Piano
  - Modern Magic
  - Monster Isle by Larry Hama
  - Mrs. Hero
  - Pandora's Blogs
  - Porcelain
  - The P.S.I.C.E.T. Identity
  - Roboy Red
  - Scandals
  - Shadow Children
  - Sherwood
  - Shockwave Darkside
  - Sore Thumbs
  - Supernovas
  - Teen Angel
  - Tesla
  - Thundersaurs
  - TotallyTina
  - Warlords of Oz
  - Wayward Sons
  - Wayward Sons: Legends
  - WICKEDPOWERED
- Renegade Comics
  - Holiday Out
  - Ms. Tree
  - normalman by Jim Valentino
  - Open Season by Jim Bricker
  - Wordsmith

== S ==
- Shanda Fantasy Arts
  - Albedo Anthropomorphics by Steve Gallacci
  - Shanda The Panda by Mike Curtis
- Slave Labor Comics
  - Johnny the Homicidal Maniac by Jhonen Vasquez
  - Milk & Cheese by Evan Dorkin

== T ==
- Top Cow Productions

== V ==
- Valiant Comics
  - Archer & Armstrong
  - Armorines
  - Bloodshot
  - Eternal Warrior
  - H.A.R.D. Corps
  - Harbinger
  - Magnus, Robot Fighter
  - Ninjak
  - Psi Lords
  - Quantum and Woody
  - Rai
  - The Second Life of Dr. Mirage
  - Shadowman
  - Solar Man of the Atom
  - Turok Dinosaur Hunter
  - Unity
  - X-O Manowar
- Vertigo
- Virgin Comics
  - Zombie Broadway

== W ==
- WildStorm

== Others ==
- Airboy by Charles Biro
- Akiko by Mark Crilley
- American Splendor by Harvey Pekar
- Astro City by Kurt Busiek
- Banimon by Boris Savic
- Beyond the Veil by Rick Law
- Big Bang Comics by Gary Carlson & Chris Ecker
- Bone by Jeff Smith
- Buster the Amazing Bear by Tommy Yune
- Cavalcade of Boys by Tim Fish
- Cherry Poptart by Larry Welz
- Comics Revue edited by Rick Norwood
- The Crow by James O'Barr
- Curbside by Robert Kirby
- A Distant Soil by Colleen Doran
- Domino Chance by Kevin Lenagh (May 1982)
- Elfquest by Wendy and Richard Pini (moved to DC Comics in 2003)
- Finder by Carla Speed McNeil
- Funnyman by Jerry Siegel and Joe Shuster (Magazine Enterprises 1948)
- Future Shock Comics by Jim and Pat McGreal (2009-2015)
- Girl Genius by Phil Foglio
- Gold Digger by Fred Perry
- Hepcats by Martin Wagner
- It's Geek 2 Me by Francis Cleetus
- Megatokyo by Fred Gallagher and Rodney Caston
- Oh Yeah! Cartoons & Comics (Nicktoons Comics anthology series)
- Omaha the Cat Dancer by Reed Waller and Kate Worley
- Optic Nerve by Adrian Tomine
- Pakkins' Land by Gary Shipman and Rhoda Shipman
- Poison Elves by Drew Hayes
- Ralph Snart by Marc Hansen
- Sam & Max by Steve Purcell
- Starchild by James A. Owen
- Teenage Mutant Ninja Turtles by Kevin Eastman and Peter Laird
- Uncle Scrooge by Carl Barks
- XXXenophile by Phil Foglio
- Zot! by Scott McCloud

== See also ==
- List of furry comics
