= Hepcat =

Hepcat(s) may refer to:

- Hepcat, a term in jazz and beatnik subculture; see Hipster (1940s subculture)
- Hepcat (band), a ska band
- Hepcats, a comic book series
- HepCat AB, owner of HepCat Store and HepTown Records
