= Rachel Rising =

Comic book series

- Cover to issue #13, featuring (l-r) Rachel, Jet, and Zoe, art by Terry Moore.

Publication information
- Publisher: Abstract Studio
- Schedule: Monthly
- Format: Ongoing
- Genre: Horror
- Publication date: August 2011 – May 2016
- No. of issues: 42
- Main character: Rachel Beck

Creative team
- Written by: Terry Moore
- Artist: Terry Moore

Collected editions
- The Shadow of Death: ISBN 1892597519
- Fear No Malus: ISBN 1892597527
- Cemetery Songs: ISBN 1892597551
- Winter Graves: ISBN 189259756X
- Night Cometh: ISBN 1892597578
- Secrets Kept: ISBN 8865435380
- Dust to Dust: ISBN 1892597608
- Omnibus: ISBN 1892597616

Rachel Rising is a 42-issue American comic book series created by Terry Moore and published through Abstract Studio. The first issue was released on August 3, 2011, to positive reviews. Reviewers sometimes criticized the pace later in the run, but the series won industry awards throughout its publication. Since its conclusion in 2016, members of the cast have reappeared in other works by Moore. Plans for a television adaptation were announced in April 2013, but was still in the scripting stage in 2015.

The story follows Rachel Beck, a young woman who wakes up in a shallow grave after being strangled. She does not remember the circumstances of the attack, but begins trying to solve her attempted murder with the help of her Aunt Johnny and close friend Jet. Their investigation soon gets put on hold when they learn of a plot to destroy their town through witchcraft and demonic spirits.

== Development ==
Moore initially had the idea for Rachel Beck, then called "deadgirl", while he was writing Birds of Prey for DC Comics in 2002, but left that series before introducing her. He held onto the concept for nine years before turning her into the protagonist of a horror series.

Moore's wife suggested writing a story about a girl who wakes up in a grave and goes to find whoever put her there. Moore told Omar Valdivieso in a Near Mint Condition interview that he moved forward with the idea because the story gave him an outlet for the rage he felt after being criticized for writing female characters in Strangers in Paradise.

== Publication history ==
The first issue was released on August 3, 2011, and quickly sold out at the distributor level, prompting Moore to announce a second printing eight days later. A third printing of the first issue was released for the 2014 Halloween ComicFest. New issues were released approximately six weeks apart.

During a Twitter conversation with fellow comic writer Joe Hill in 2013, Moore mentioned sales of Rachel Rising had fallen and he may have to cancel it if they fell any further. Concerned fans responded by using the #SaveRachelRising hashtag in an effort to show support and promote the book. Afterwards the sales stopped falling, but they did not increase. Moore ended the series at issue #42 in May 2016. In addition to low sales, the constant dark themes in Rachel Rising left Moore feeling drained, and he wanted to move on to projects that were more fun, like Motor Girl.

Rachel Rising has been collected into a series of square bound paperbacks containing six issues each. The same day the first collection was released, The Walking Dead #95 included a promotional excerpt from Rachel Rising #1. A hardcover omnibus, Rachel Rising Black Edition, was made available to order at the 2016 Emerald City Comic Con and through Moore's website. The 776-page book has an all-black cover and was limited to 750 copies, each signed by Moore. A standard edition omnibus was released in June 2016 with the same cover image as issue number one.

A French translation of the series was published in France by Delcourt.

== Plot ==
Rachel Beck wakes up in a shallow grave in the woods with rope burns on her neck and no memory of how she got there. She hitchhikes to her house in the fictional town of Manson, Massachusetts, where her friends and family do not immediately recognize her. Her Aunt Johnny, who is a mortician, examines her and determines that Rachel should not be alive. With the help of Rachel's friend Jet, the three decide to find Rachel's attacker. Meanwhile, two other women in Manson are killed; one by Lilith, and one by a 10-year-old girl named Zoe who is possessed by the demon Malus. When Rachel's group coincidentally meets Zoe, Lilith causes a car accident that injures Aunt Johnny and kills Jet. Rachel accompanies Jet's body to the morgue, where Jet comes back to life in a condition similar to Rachel. Lilith traps Zoe and confronts Malus, whom she summoned 300 years prior to take revenge on the city of Manson for killing her followers during a witch-hunt. He tells her he is close to bringing about the End times, which will also destroy Manson. During their conversation, Zoe slits her wrists and Malus leaves her body to find another host. Zoe is taken to a hospital, where her life is saved and Rachel and Jet find her.

Lilith reincarnates two of her followers into the bodies of the other two dead women, and the three begin to terrorize Manson through plagues and violence. Rachel learns she is also a former witch who was resurrected by Lilith, but her memories are confused with the real Rachel Beck. Jet was brought back to life by the spirit of James, Rachel's boyfriend from her past life. Rachel, Jet, and Zoe kill the two resurrected witches and stop Lilith's plan to destroy Manson. James' spirit moves on to the afterlife, leaving Jet herself again. Rachel heals Jet and Aunt Johnny's wounds using her knowledge of witchcraft, and they resume the search for Rachel's killer.

Zoe is taken in by priest who has become Malus' new host. He gives her a blade which was once Satan's sword and tells her she will bear the antichrist. Zoe kills the priest, and Malus moves through several more hosts. Zoe reunites with Rachel and the others, and they decide to work with Lilith to stop Malus. Overcome by her inevitable role in the end of the world, Zoe cuts her own throat. While Rachel tries to save Zoe's life, Lilith takes her blade and confronts Malus's new host. Malus resists, and his host is killed. As he leaves the body, Lilith stabs him with the blade, condemning him to Hell.

Lilith tells Rachel that she was murdered by a serial killer. When Rachel confronts him, she finds he is bedridden due to an unrelated injury caused by Malus months earlier. She kills him, but he is able to shoot her before he dies. Rachel dies next to his bed, hoping she will finally stay dead. She awakens in the morgue, where Zoe is watching over her.

== Critical reception ==
The series debuted to mostly positive reviews, earning an average score of 8.6/10 from critics according to the review aggregation website Comic Book Roundup. Writing for Comic Book Resources, Kelly Thompson praised the first issue's balance of humor and dark elements. The series continued to receive favorable reviews, but critics frequently note the story's slow pace. Rachel Rising appeared on numerous "best of" lists during its run and the omnibus collection received an average rating of 8.5/10 at Comic Book Roundup.

=== Awards ===
Rachel Rising was recognized by multiple industry award programs. It won the Harvey Awards for Best Letterer in 2014 and Best Cartoonist in 2015 and was nominated for Best New Series (2012), Best Continuing Series (2012, 2013), and Best Cartoonist (2013, 2014, 2016). It was also nominated for an Eisner Award in the categories Best Continuing Series (2012), Best Writer/Artist (2012, 2014), and Best Letterer (2014). The series was nominated for Best Comic/Graphic Novel by the British Fantasy Society in 2014. When it was released in 2012, the first paperback collection was nominated for a Bram Stoker Award in the Superior Achievement in a Graphic Novel category by the Horror Writers Association.

== Sequel ==
In 2017, Moore said Rachel Rising is set in the same fictional universe as his other works, Strangers in Paradise, Echo, and Motor Girl. Also that year, Moore discussed plans to do a second volume of Rachel Rising after completing his 2018 series Strangers in Paradise XXV, saying the story was unfinished. The characters from Rachel Rising appeared in Strangers in Paradise XXV. In May 2019, Moore started publishing Five Years, a 10-issue series which unites the casts from his previous works and resolves plots from Rachel Rising. His 2021 series Serial followed Zoe on a quest for revenge.

== Television adaptation ==
Ben Roberts, a senior vice president at Alcon Entertainment, was interested in adapting Moore's previous comic, Echo, but the rights to it had already been sold. Instead, Moore suggested Roberts adapt Rachel Rising, which was not yet being published. Roberts agreed, and in April 2013, Alcon Television Group announced plans for a Rachel Rising television adaptation. Roberts was attached as the series producer, and Moore, Lloyd Levin, Andrew Kosove, Broderick Johnson, and Sharon Hall as executive producers. A showrunner wrote a spec script, but Moore said it "just wasn't right" and, after renegotiations, Moore was given more creative control and was allowed to write the pilot script in January 2015. The script was still being shopped around Hollywood since 2016.
