= Strangers in Paradise =

American comic book series by Terry Moore

- Pocket book #1 cover

Publication information
- Publisher: (vol. 1) Antarctic Press (3 issues, 1993–1994) (vol. 2) Abstract Studio (14 issues, 1994–1996) (vol. 3) Image Comics/Homage Comics (8 issues, 1996–1997); Abstract Studio (82 issues, 1997–2007)
- Genre: Romance, slice-of-life, crime, thriller
- Publication date: November 1993 – 2007
- No. of issues: 107
- Main character(s): Katina "Katchoo" Choovanski; Francine Peters-Silver

Creative team
- Created by: Terry Moore

Collected editions
- I Dream of You: ISBN 1-892597-01-2

Strangers in Paradise is a creator-owned comic book series, written and drawn by Terry Moore, which debuted in 1993. Principally the story of a love triangle between two women and one man, Strangers in Paradise began as a slice-of-life dramedy that later expanded to incorporate aspects of the crime and thriller genres. Moore has remained the sole creator throughout the run, with the exception of a superhero dream sequence drawn by Jim Lee that opens Volume 3, issue #1. The artwork was originally presented in Moore's distinctive black-and-white style, aside from two full colour dream sequences, which included the aforementioned superhero panels.

The majority of the run has been published under Moore's creator-owned imprint, Abstract Studio. The first issue was published in November 1993, and the original series reached its planned conclusion in 2007 with issue #90 of Volume 3.

In 2018, Moore officially revived the series as Strangers in Paradise XXV for the 25th anniversary.

== Origins and publication history ==
Terry Moore stated that "I started out wanting to do a newspaper strip, and tried one idea after another before I realized I hated the gag-a-day life and really wanted to try a story instead". Moore told Omar Valdivieso in a Near Mint Condition interview that he was inspired by girls' comics and Ian Fleming's James Bond novels.

Strangers in Paradise, or "this story about 2 girls and a guy who gets to know them" (from Moore's introduction to The Collected Strangers in Paradise, Volume One), used characters he had developed during his time on the gag-a-day circuit. For example, Katchoo appears as a "happy-go-lucky wood nymph" in an early strip by Moore about an enchanted forest. These strips were collected into two trade paperbacks, but they did not include three issues. Because of this, the entire run was later published in one large paperback edition entitled The Complete Paradise Too. This volume can be considered the true origin of Katchoo, Francine and the Strangers in Paradise universe.

SiP, as it is commonly known, began as a three-issue miniseries published by Antarctic Press in 1993, which focused entirely on the relationship between the three main characters and Francine's unfaithful boyfriend. This is now known as "Volume 1". Thirteen issues were published under Moore's own "Abstract Studio" imprint, and these make up "Volume 2". This is where the "thriller" plot was introduced. The series moved to Image Comics' Homage imprint for the start of "Volume 3", but after eight issues moved back to Abstract Studio, where it continued with the same numbering. Volume 3 concluded at issue #90, released on June 6, 2007.

Moore revived the series as Strangers in Paradise XXV in 2018 for the 25th anniversary. The new miniseries included characters and elements from Moore's other works, Echo, Rachel Rising, and Motor Girl.

== Plot ==
The story is centered on the stormy, lifelong relationship between two women, Francine Helena Peters and Katina Marie ("Katchoo") Choovanski, and their friend David Qin. Francine considers Katchoo her best, oldest friend. Katchoo makes no secret of her romantic attraction to Francine, creating tension each time Francine remains wary of fully committing to her. Meanwhile, Katchoo herself is deeply conflicted when David professes his love for her, as adamantly as she has declared her own love for Francine.

The love triangle later expands to a love rectangle with the introduction of Casey Bullock, who marries Francine's ex-boyfriend Freddie Femur (on the rebound from Francine) early in the series and later divorces him, then goes on to pursue both David and Katchoo.

Flashbacks and flash-forwards reveal more about the characters as the love story alternates with mystery, danger and intrigue, most of it stemming from Katchoo's past as an underage call girl who was taken in by David's lesbian sister, Darcy Parker (David's connection to Darcy only comes to light after he enters Katchoo's life). Darcy puts her "Parker Girls" to work for the shadowy Big Six organization, an international crime syndicate with influence over the world of politics. The Parker Girls are highly trained women, weaponized on targeted assignments by Darcy and the Big Six to control, manipulate, spy upon, and ultimately kill men and women in positions of power and authority.

== Characters ==
Katina "Katchoo" Choovanski
Katchoo (occasionally referred to as "The Original Angry Blonde" by fans of the series) is a temperamental artist with a violent past. A former prostitute, Katchoo was the lover and agent of Darcy Parker. Katchoo has been in love with her best friend, Francine, for most of her life, though she has complicated romantic feelings for her only male friend, David, as well. Katchoo was ranked 69th in Comics Buyer's Guide's "100 Sexiest Women in Comics" list.
Francine Helena Peters-Silver
Katchoo's kind-hearted best friend, Francine struggles with her weight and her self-image, never quite able to see the beauty in herself that Katchoo is enamored with. Francine has difficulty bringing herself to make a romantic commitment to Katchoo, partly due to her Methodist upbringing and partly because of her childhood dream to become a wife and mother. Her fairytale marriage to Brad Silver comes crashing down when she realizes that he is unfaithful to her, leading her to reconsider choosing him over Katchoo. Francine was ranked 86th in Comics Buyer's Guide' "100 Sexiest Women in Comics" list.
Yousaka Takahashi/David Qin
A gentle, sensitive art student, Yousaka is the younger brother of Darcy Parker and the unwilling heir to the Takahashi crime syndicate. Once the leader of a violent street gang, Yousaka became a born-again Christian after a personal tragedy and he changed his name to "David Qin" to reflect his new identity and honoring the young man he murdered. The complex romantic feelings he harbors for Casey and Katchoo come to a head when he is diagnosed with a serious illness, leading the trio to contemplate having a baby in his memory.
Casey Bullock-Femur
A blonde, busty, and bisexual aerobics instructor, Casey was married to Freddie Femur but divorced him after learning that he was still in love with Francine. Since the divorce, she has had romantic involvements with both Katchoo and David. Because of her childhood anorexia, she is unable to have a child with David.
Freddie Femur
Francine's ex-boyfriend, Casey's ex-husband, and a womanizing attorney, Freddie cheated on Francine and humiliated her during their break-up (giving her a nervous breakdown in the process) but later becomes obsessed with her.
Darcy Parker
A ruthless and predatory crime boss who leads the "Parker Girls", women who are skilled in various acts of seduction and espionage. Though she employs only women and expresses a profound abhorrence of the male gender itself, Darcy harbors an intense, incestuous love for her brother David. She had a relationship with Katchoo (and benefited from Katchoo's natural business acumen) until Katchoo ran away to Hawaii with her friend Emma. Darcy and the Parker Girls continue to re-enter and complicate Katchoo's life throughout the series.
Mary Beth "Tambi" Baker
A brutal enforcer loyal to Darcy Parker, Tambi is skilled in not only the deadly arts, but in business and strategy. She and her twin sister Sara Beth ("Bambi") both work for Darcy and are Katchoo's older half-sisters. In a quest to continue the Baker (and Parker) line, Tambi schemes to encourage Katchoo to bear David's child. Tambi's many scars are self-inflicted.
Griffin Silver
An aging rock star admired by Katchoo in her youth, Griffin's songs were printed in the series long before the character made his first appearance. He is the brother of Brad Silver.
Brad Silver
A charming, handsome gynecologist, Brad at first appears to be an ideal husband for Francine, but their inability to communicate drives a wedge between them.

== Awards ==
Strangers in Paradise received the Eisner Award for Best Serialized Story in 1996 for "I Dream of You" as well as the National Cartoonists Society's Reuben Award for Best Comic Book in 2003.

The series also won the GLAAD Media Award for Outstanding Comic Book in 2000 and 2008 and also nominated for the award in 2002, 2003, 2004, 2005, 2006 and 2019. As such, Strangers in Paradise has the distinction of being the most-nominated comic in the history of the award.

== Collected editions ==
Strangers in Paradise has been collected into a series of full-size trade paperbacks, hardback collections, and smaller format paperback collections. These reprints collect the issues into different sets.

The full-size paperback collections to date are:

| # | Title | Issues |
|---|---|---|
| 1 | The Collected Strangers in Paradise | Vol. 1, #1–3 |
| 2 | I Dream of You | Vol. 2, #1–9 |
| 3 | It's a Good Life | Vol. 2, #10–13 |
| 4 | Love Me Tender | Vol. 3, #1–5 |
| 5 | Immortal Enemies | Vol. 3, #6–12 |
| 6 | High School! | Vol. 3, #13–16 |
| 7 | Sanctuary | Vol. 3, #17–24 |
| 8 | My Other Life | Vol. 3, #25–30 |
| 9 | Child of Rage | Vol. 3, #31–32, 34–38 |
| 10 | Tropic of Desire | Vol. 3, #39–43 |
| 11 | Brave New World | Vol. 3, #44–48 |
| 12 | Heart in Hand | Vol. 3, #50–54 |
| 13 | Flower to Flame | Vol. 3, #55–60 |
| 14 | David's Story | Vol. 3, #61–63 |
| 15 | Tomorrow Now | Vol. 3, #64–69 |
| 16 | Molly & Poo | Vol. 2, #14, Vol. 3, #49 & 73 |
| 17 | Tattoo | Vol. 3, #70–72, 74–76 |
| 18 | Love & Lies | Vol. 3, #77–82 |
| 19 | Ever After | Vol. 3, #83–90 |

The hardback collections to date are:

| # | ISBN | Title | Issues |
|---|---|---|---|
| 1 | ISBN 978-1892597052 | The Complete Strangers in Paradise, Volume 1 | Vol. 1, #1–3 |
| 2 | ISBN 978-1892597069 | The Complete Strangers in Paradise, Volume 2 | Vol. 2, #1–13 |
| 3 | ISBN 978-1892597106 | The Complete Strangers in Paradise Volume 3, Part 1 | Vol. 3, #1–12 |
| 4 | ISBN 978-1892597120 | The Complete Strangers in Paradise Volume 3, Part 2 | Vol. 3, #13–25, Lyrics & Poems |
| 5 | ISBN 978-1892597144 | The Complete Strangers in Paradise Volume 3, Part 3 | Vol. 3, #26–32, 34–38 |
| 6 | ISBN 978-1892597175 | The Complete Strangers in Paradise Volume 3, Part 4 | Vol. 3, #39–46, plus 49 |
| 7 | ISBN 978-1892597236 | The Complete Strangers in Paradise Volume 3, Part 5 | Vol. 3, #47–48, 50–57 |
| 8 | ISBN 978-1892597281 | The Complete Strangers in Paradise Volume 3, Part 6 | Vol. 3, #58–69 |
| 9 | ISBN 978-1892597366 | The Complete Strangers in Paradise Volume 3, Part 7 | Vol. 3, #70–72, 74–82 |
| 10 | ISBN 978-1892597373 | The Complete Strangers in Paradise Volume 3, Part 8 | Vol. 3, #83–90 |

The "pocket book" collections to date are:

| # | ISBN | Title | Issues |
|---|---|---|---|
| 1 | ISBN 978-1-892597-26-7 | Strangers in Paradise Pocket Book 1 | Vol. 1, #1–3 and Vol. 2, #1–13 |
| 2 | ISBN 978-1-892597-29-8 | Strangers in Paradise Pocket Book 2 | Vol. 3, #1–17 |
| 3 | ISBN 978-1-892597-30-4 | Strangers in Paradise Pocket Book 3 | Vol. 3, #18–24, 26–32, 34–38 |
| 4 | ISBN 978-1-892597-31-1 | Strangers in Paradise Pocket Book 4 | Vol. 3, #40–45, 47–48, 50–60 |
| 5 | ISBN 978-1-892597-38-0 | Strangers in Paradise Pocket Book 5 | Vol. 3, #61–72, 74–76, plus Complete Molly & Poo 46, 49, 73 |
| 6 | ISBN 978-1-892597-39-7 | Strangers in Paradise Pocket Book 6 | Vol. 3, #77–90 |

Other books to date are:

- Lyrics and Poems
- Strangers in Paradise Source Book
- Strangers in Paradise Treasury Edition
- Strangers in Paradise calendars: 1999, 2000, 2002, 2003, 2004. For unknown reasons, there is no 2001 calendar.

== Merchandise ==
Two limited edition statuettes of Katchoo were produced by Clayburn Moore as the first in a planned series of three statues based around the series. In the first, she is standing in a skimpy black dress, and in the second she is reclining in a bath wearing her leather jacket and holding a drink and a gun.

In 2009, Shocker Toys released a Katchoo figure as part of the first series of its "Indie Spotlight" line.

In 1996, a series of trading cards was released by Comic Images, consisting of a 90-card base set plus extra collector's cards, such as the 500 'autograph cards' that featured Terry Moore's signature and information on the creation of SiP. These extra cards were inserted randomly into packs. Also produced was a matching SiP binder, which came with 12 9-pocket sleeves to hold the cards.

Advertised on the official SiP website are character pin badges representing Francine, Katchoo and David. There is also a black tote bag featuring the Strangers in Paradise logo and a tumbler decorated with colour panels from the series, in addition to a postcard set and two T-shirts, although several of these items are listed as 'sold out', and are hard to come by elsewhere.

== Film adaptation ==
In Autumn of 2017, Angela Robinson and Moore announced a film adaptation of the comic. Moore was working on a script for it. IMG Global Media was attached to finance the project and Robinson was attached to direct.
