= Anne Bonnie (comics) =

Comic book created by Tim Yates

- Cover to Anne Bonnie #6, art by Tim Yates

Publication information
- Publisher: Blue Juice Comics
- Schedule: Irregular
- Format: Ongoing series
- Publication date: March 2014
- No. of issues: 9

Creative team
- Created by: Tim Yates
- Written by: Tim Yates
- Artist: Tim Yates
- Letterer: Crank!
- Colorist: Tim Yates
- Editor: Thomas Mumme

Collected editions
- The Journey Begins: ISBN 1-940967-51-1

Anne Bonnie is an American comic book created, written, and illustrated by Tim Yates. The first issue was published by Blue Juice Comics on March 19, 2014. Additional issues have been published on an irregular schedule. In December 2015, the first six issues were collected into a trade paperback.

The story is a fantasy adventure about Ariana, a young girl who steals a haunted ship to pursue her dream of being a pirate.

== Publication history ==
Tim Yates was a nursing student before switching career paths and enrolling at The Kubert School, where he befriended classmate Gavin Smith. When Smith was hired to illustrate The Accelerators for Blue Juice Comics in 2011, he brought Yates along as his colorist. While promoting The Accelerators at the 2012 New York Comic Con, Yates was sketching characters and concepts for Anne Bonnie, a pirate adventure inspired by Pirates of the Caribbean and Indiana Jones. He was planning to pitch it to Blue Juice publisher Thomas Mumme as a new series, but Mumme approached Yates first to ask for a proposal.

Although Anne Bonnie is the first time Yates wrote or drew a comic, most of his previous story ideas had starred a female protagonist. When he began developing a pirate concept, including the historical Anne Bonny was a "no-brainer" for him. He chose to use a fantasy setting to give himself more freedom in his storytelling.

When writing scripts for the story, Yates uses a loose scripting style that allows him to make changes as he's creating the artwork. He draws inspiration from anime and cartoons in his open and colorful line art, which contrasts with more common styles that utilize solid blacks. Once the art is finished, he refines the dialogue to remove redundant exposition and enhance humor.

The first issue of Anne Bonnie was released to comic specialty stores through Diamond Comics Distribution and digitally through Comixology on March 19, 2014. Diamond sold out of the approximately 3,500 print run within a week. It was the 352nd best selling single issue of the month. A second issue with a print run of about 1,800 copies was released in June, followed by a third issue in October. After a hiatus, the series returned for three more issues released on a quarterly schedule beginning in June 2015. These six issues were collected into a single volume with the subtitle The Journey Begins in December 2015.

A seventh issue was scheduled for July 2017, but release was delayed when Blue Juice bought the rights to the project from Yates. Issues seven through nine were released monthly beginning October 2018. Because of the transfer of rights, the issues were published without creator credits.

== Plot ==
Ariana is an orphan who lives under the care of Lord Firestorm. He tries to teach her proper etiquette and manners, but she is more interested in the legend of Anne Bonnie, the Pirate Queen, and dreams of having her own adventures. As a teenager, she discovers the Crimson Dawn, an old pirate ship, beneath Lord Firestorm's castle and steals it. Because the ship is haunted, she is able to sail it by herself. In search of adventures, she quickly makes new friends and enemies.

== Reception ==
Noting that an early print run of the first issue sold out at comic conventions, Bleeding Cool editor Hannah Means-Shannon called Anne Bonnie a "major success". A team of reviewers for Unwinnable appreciated the creative art design, but believed the story had pacing problems.
