= Martin Wagner (artist) =

American artist, cartoonist, and filmmaker

- Born: Martin Wagner; April 27, 1966 (age 60)
- Areas: Writer, Editor
- Notable works: Hepcats

Martin Wagner (born April 27, 1966) is an American artist, cartoonist, and filmmaker.

== Career ==
=== Comics ===
Hepcats #9

While a student at the University of Texas at Austin, Wagner began Hepcats as a comic strip in the college newspaper The Daily Texan in 1987. Starting in 1989, he self-published it as a black-and-white comic book series and it gained more exposure with the assistance of Dave Sim, who allowed Wagner to submit a page to his bi-weekly reprints of Cerebus. To help support the comics financially, Wagner also offered sketches to fans who sent him cash in the mail. Although the series received critical praise, the combination of poor sales, Wagner's lack of business experience, and his divorce in 1991 contributed to financial difficulties. Along with Jeff Smith (Bone), Colleen Doran (A Distant Soil), James Owen (Starchild), Larry Marder (Beanworld) and Sim, Wagner was one of the prominent self-publishers of the 1990s, but a hectic schedule eventually led him to cease publishing the series altogether following issue No. 12 in 1994. In 1996 he made a deal with Antarctic Press to republish the existing material, to be followed by new issues, but the only new material published was a special "#0" color issue. Wagner also developed the Snowblind story-line as part of the Hepcats series which would be re-printed into a novel, but it never continued past part one.

=== Film ===
Following his departure from the comics industry, Wagner illustrated children's books and began a new career working in Austin-area film and television commercial productions. In 1999, Wagner produced some early conceptual drawings for director Robert Rodriguez (who was also a cartoonist at the University of Texas at the same time as Wagner) for his film Spy Kids, though he did not work on the film during production or any of its sequels.

In 2005, Wagner was slated to direct a 24p high-definition short film, Tremendous Risk for Mr. Ferdico, but when the producers failed to secure funding, he shifted his attentions to a documentary, Bloody Work, which was successfully funded on Kickstarter in the summer of 2013, but was never released, with updates to the campaign ceasing in 2016.

Wagner was a rotating co-host on the webcast and public access show The Atheist Experience from 2000 to 2016.
