= Fred Gallagher (cartoonist) =

American illustrator and web cartoonist

- Fred Gallagher sketching at an autograph booth at Anime Expo 2011
- Born: November 15, 1968 (age 57); Long Island, New York
- Other names: Fredrin, Piro
- Occupations: Architect, Illustrator, Web Cartoonist & Bus Driver
- Known for: Megatokyo
- Spouse: Sarah
- Children: Jack

Frederick M. Gallagher III (born November 15, 1968) is an American illustrator and web cartoonist. He is best known as the artist, co-creator, and now full owner of Megatokyo. He also goes by the name of Piro, the main character of Megatokyo, who he has stated is an idealized version of himself when he was in college. He took this name from that of the cat in the visual novel Kanon.

Gallagher lives with his wife and their son in Saline, Michigan.

== Projects ==
=== The Fine Red Cat ===
The Fine Red Cat (1993) is a children's book by Jennifer Ann Gallagher, Fred Gallagher's sister. It is notable as the first published work Gallagher illustrated.

=== Megatokyo ===
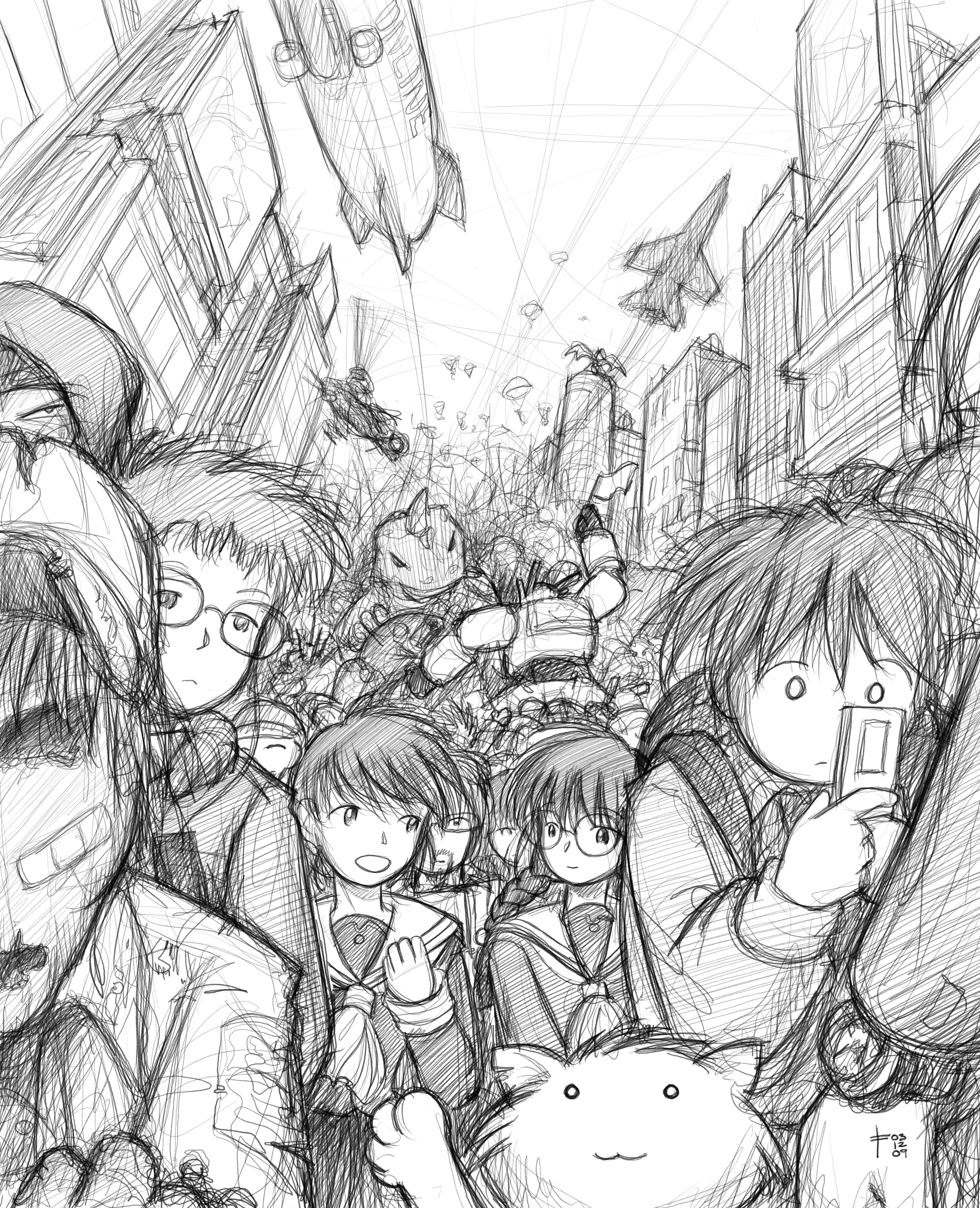
A page of Megatokyo drawn by Gallagher

The webcomic Megatokyo started its run on August 14, 2000 in collaboration with Rodney Caston, who owned the domain and wrote many of the scripts for the first year and a half, while Gallagher was responsible for the artwork. Due to creative differences, Caston agreed to sell his share in the venture to Gallagher in May 2002.

Megatokyo's success has allowed Gallagher to pursue it as a full-time occupation starting in October 2002, after being laid off from his job as an architect. He took a part-time job in 2018-present, as life events had prevented regular updates and revenue dropped off accordingly. Megatokyo in its entirety is available free of charge at the Megatokyo website, with strips being paired with comments from Gallagher. Gallagher's income from the strip comes from advertising, sales of Megatokyo books and merchandise, Patreon, and Twitch.

Since Gallagher attained full control over the strip, it has become more reflective of his vision, with an increasingly complex cast of characters, and a far slower pace than the original strips. The influence of Japanese manga and computer dating sims can be seen in both the character design, plotline and storytelling. While this has earned praise from some critics, it has also alienated some fans of the earlier strips, which were more comical, relying more on humor, slapstick, gags, and simpler storylines.

=== Fredart ===
Fredart is a collection of Gallagher's works dating back several years. It includes development sketches from other projects, such as Warmth. Since Megatokyo began, most of the content has been focused on characters from that project.

Fredart Studios LLC is the name of the company that officially owns the trademark to Megatokyo and Fred's other works. Megagear Inc. is the company owned and operated by Fred and his wife Sarah that runs the MegaGear store which sells Megatokyo related merchandise.

=== envelop(e) ===
A doujinshi work of Gallagher's from 1999. As he describes it:

Using the format of an illustrated story, 'envelop(e)' tells the story of how a misplaced envelope and love letter causes confusion between childhood friends who never really understood how much they meant to each other before.

=== Warmth ===
Warmth is a more serious love story on which Gallagher was working before Megatokyo, but it was pushed into the background when Megatokyo became popular. A few chapters of Warmth were released in the early issues of I.C. Entertainment's AmeriManga magazine. Gallagher has stated a number of times that he has not given up on the property, and will continue it in the future. Gallagher had released a sample (but this was later deleted), and many other drawings that include characters who will be featured in Warmth.

The main characters of Warmth are called Tom Moore, Tobari Saeko, and Shizuhara Eimi. Both Saeko and Eimi have cameos in recent Megatokyo strips.

=== Blurred ===
Blurred was a semi-erotic experimental art website, created by Gallagher in 1998 using the pen name "blurri." Gallagher later took it offline for personal reasons, but a discussion on February 2, 2006 on 4chan started a coordinated attempt to discover the contents of this website. On June 8, 2006, Gallagher again allowed public access to the "blurred" site, and mentioned it in his newspost on Megatokyo, in order to end the controversy.

=== Title TBA ===
Fred Gallagher announced that, some time in 2007, megagear (the Megatokyo store) would release a mini doujinshi. Little to nothing was known about this project, but it was expected later in the year. "We are looking forward to a great 2007. Megatokyo Volume 5 will be released in the Spring and we have lots of other new items planned including a skateboard deck, the first Megatokyo calendar, clocks, and a mini doujinshi for later in the year. "

It is possible that this is an endgames doujinshi. "But maybe 2 regularly delivered comics with everything else you expect from these websites - rants, updates, etc - including some other projects like maybe 'warmth' getting off the ground (and that endgames doujin i want to do)... we'll see."

In 2009, he posted an endgames preview and called it a doujin.

In May 2011, it was announced that Endgames were being revamped in a light novel format, with a story written by webfiction author Thomas Knapp, with four light novels planned. A short story "Behind the Masque" was also announced, and released on Amazon's Kindle Store on June 10, 2011.

== Convention appearances ==
Anime conventions in the United States Gallagher has appeared at include Otakon in 2001, 2002, 2003, and 2005, as well as A-Kon, Sakura-Con, Comic-Con International, and Anime Central. International convention appearances include Anime Expo Tokyo in 2004 and Ayacon in Northampton, UK in 2003.

== See also ==
- Rodney Caston
