= Blue Juice Comics =

American comic book publisher

- Parent company: Blue Juice Films, Inc
- Status: Active
- Founded: 2012; 14 years ago
- Founder: Thomas Mumme; Adam Miller; Michael Misconi; Jeremy Schneider
- Country of origin: United States
- Headquarters location: Orlando, Florida
- Publication types: Comic books, Picture books, Short stories
- Fiction genres: Science fiction, Fantasy

Blue Juice Comics is an American publisher of comic books, picture books, and prose. The company was founded as the publishing division of Blue Juice Films, Inc in 2012. Most of its publications were initially conceived as film or animation ideas.

== History ==
In 2005, Thomas Mumme, Adam Miller, Michael Misconi, and Jeremy Schneider used their freelance experience in television and film to establish Blue Juice Films, Inc in Orlando, Florida with the intent to create short films, music videos, and feature films. They were successful with the first two goals, but were unable to get funding for their feature film ideas. Meanwhile, the group members were still freelancing outside of Blue Juice Films. In 2011, Mumme and Schneider were working on AMC’s Comic Book Men television show with Brooklyn-based screenplay writer R.F.I. Porto. This project gave Mumme the idea to try using comics as a proof of concept for feature film proposals. Blue Juice Films reviewed some of Porto's unsold screenplay ideas, selecting the science fiction idea The Accelerators to publish as a comic.

In January 2012, before researching the details of the comic industry, they created the Blue Juice Comics division to publish The Accelerators. Mumme discussed the new project with Schneider and Porto on the set of Comic Book Men and was overheard by the show hosts. Two of the hosts, Mike Zapcic and Ming Chen, also host a comic-themed podcast called I Sell Comics!, where they invited Blue Juice Comics to give weekly updates on the development of their new company and comic. Over the course of a year, the episodes covered their progress and missteps as they moved from script to finished product. These updates were paired with social media updates that showed the artwork as it progressed from pencils to a finished page. Blue Juice also polled its Facebook followers to see what a fair price for a small-press comic is. Although it did not have a comic to sell, Blue Juice had a promotional table at the 2012 New York Comic Con. The logistics of getting the comic into comic specialty stores through Diamond Comic Distributors and the digital market place through Comixology took longer than the company expected, but the first issue of The Accelerators was advertised for release in May 2013. It was followed in March 2014 by Anne Bonnie, a comic written and drawn by The Accelerators colorist Tim Yates. Blue Juice Comics hoped to have a third comic available that same year, with a plan to release each title on a quarterly basis. By staggering the release, they would have one new comic available every month. However, the third comic, Aether & Empire, was not released until 2016.

== Titles ==
=== The Accelerators ===
The Accelerators is a time travel adventure about a small cast of characters. Originally intended to be a film, the concept was turned into a comic when Blue Juice Comics expressed interest. It is written by R.F.I. Porto, drawn by Gavin Smith, colored by Tim Yates, and lettered by Crank!. The first issue was released on May 22, 2013, and received an average critic rating of 8.1 out of 10 according to review aggregator Comic Book Roundup. In a review for Horror Talk, James Ferguson said the comic "stand[s] out within the genre [because travelers] can only go forward." Twenty issues have been released on an irregular schedule. Walt Flanagan provided the cover art for the first five issues, at which point Smith took over that task as well.

=== Aether & Empire ===
Aether & Empire is a steampunk adventure about an 1879 expedition to Mars described by writer Mike Horan as "Jules Verne meets Star Trek". Originally a screenplay, it was rewritten as a comic when Blue Juice Comics expressed interest. It was drawn by Bong Ty Dazo with cover and colors by Tim Yates. The first issue was released on April 13, 2016, and received an average critic rating of 8.9 out of 10 according to review aggregator Comic Book Roundup. In his review for Scifi Pulse, Patrick Hayes praised Dazo's ability to "[make] every panel action packed; even without dialogue". Six issues were released on a monthly basis. The series won the 2016 Spacie Award for Best Independent Comic.

=== Anne Bonnie ===
Anne Bonnie is an action-adventure tale about a young girl who wants to become a pirate. It is written and illustrated by Tim Yates with lettering by Crank!. The first issue was released on March 19, 2014, and sold out of its print run of 3500 copies within one week. It was followed by two more issues on a quarterly schedule in 2014. After a brief hiatus, three more issues were released in 2015. A seventh issue has been scheduled for October 2018. In a review for Unwinnable, Anne Bonnie was criticized for its pacing and praised for its creative art design.

=== Dudley and the Toy Keeper’s Chest ===
Dudley and the Toy Keeper's Chest is a children's picture book created by Patrick Algermissen that was first published July 14, 2015. It was adapted from Algermissen's 2005 short film made with puppets. A review from The Literary Connoisseur on June 16, 2015, called the book "a wonder" and said it "has awakened the child in me and reminded me of how magical children's books can be."

=== Growing Dark ===
Growing Dark is a prose anthology of short horror stories by Kristopher Triana that was first printed July 28, 2015. In a review of Growing Dark, Cemetery Dance Publications said that all the stories were "nuanced and highly entertaining...well worth a read for short story fans" and that "going on the strength of these stories, it's a safe bet we'll be seeing Triana's name a lot more in the years to come." Rue Morgue's review by Richelle Charkot said "Triana's writing might not be particularly complex or poetic, but his knack for imagery makes this short story collection a must-read."
