= Motor Girl =

Comics by Terry Moore

- Cover to issue #1, art by Terry Moore

Publication information
- Publisher: Abstract Studio
- Schedule: Monthly
- Format: Ongoing
- Genre: Science fiction
- Publication date: November 2016 – November 2017
- No. of issues: 10
- Main character: Samantha "Sam" Lockyear

Creative team
- Written by: Terry Moore
- Artist: Terry Moore

Collected editions
- Real Life (#1-5): ISBN 9781892597632
- No Man Left Behind (#6-10): ISBN 1892597659
- Omnibus HC: ISBN 1892597683

Motor Girl is an American comic book series created by Terry Moore and published through Abstract Studio. It was initially serialized in ten issues between November 2016 and November 2017 with new installments approximately six weeks apart. It has since been collected into two softcover volumes containing five issues each, released in May and December 2017, and a single omnibus edition in March 2018.

The story is about Sam, an Iraq War veteran with post-traumatic stress disorder. She works alone in a junkyard and talks to her imaginary friend Mike, who is a gorilla. When she learns the junkyard's owner might sell it, she begins to see friendly aliens visiting the junkyard. When the prospective buyer threatens the aliens, Sam resists him.

The series received generally positive reviews. Critics noted how different the tone in Motor Girl is from Moore's other comic work. The ending was praised for being well-planned.

== Publication history ==
Terry Moore began developing the concept as early as 2007, when he completed work on his series Echo. The concept developed from a sketch Moore made showing a female mechanic and a gorilla riding a motorcycle in the background. Moore wanted to do a Calvin and Hobbes type story that involved an invisible friend. When another creator told him they were already doing something with a similar premise, Moore chose to work on Rachel Rising instead and included some elements of the original Motor Girl character in a supporting character for that comic. When Rachel Rising concluded in 2016, the other creator had not followed through with the idea, so Moore decided to move forward with it. The first issue was released on November 2, 2016. New issues were released approximately six weeks apart. The series concluded with issue #10 in November 2017.

The series was reprinted in two paperback volumes that collected five issues each. The first was released in March 2017, followed by the second in December. A single-volume omnibus was released in soft and hardcover in March 2018 along with a special edition hardcover version limited to 1000 copies that was only available directly from Moore.

The junkyard owner, Libby, played a minor role in Moore's first comic work, Strangers in Paradise. Moore has confirmed that Motor Girl is also set in the same fictional universe as his other works, Echo and Rachel Rising. The characters had cameo appearances in the 2018 series Strangers in Paradise XXV.

== Plot ==
As a US Marine serving three tours in the Iraq War, Samantha "Sam" Lockyear survives two IED attacks and spends a lengthy time being tortured as a prisoner of war. Returning home, she lives and works at Libby's scrap yard, located in a remote part of a southwestern US desert. Due to her war experience, she has post-traumatic stress disorder and severe headaches. She spends her days talking to Mike, her imaginary friend who is a gorilla. One afternoon, Libby stops by to let Sam know a wealthy man has offered to buy the property. That night, a flying saucer experiences engine trouble and crashes in the scrap yard. Sam believes it is a hallucination, but plays along and repairs the UFO's engine.

The proposed buyer, a government scientist named Walton, has developed a weapon capable of shooting down UFOs and wants the land because of the high amount of extraterrestrial activity in the area. When Libby refuses, he hires two mercenaries, Victor and Larry, to strongarm her into changing her mind. Sam stops them, breaking Larry's nose. After a few more attempts at coercion, Victor and Larry learn Sam is a veteran and regret causing her trouble. Sam collapses, and Libby takes her to a hospital where they learn she still has some shrapnel in her brain. She will die if it is not removed, but doing so will cause Mike to go away.

When Walton captures an alien, Sam, Victor, and Larry decide to free it. When they put their plan into action, a large number of flying saucers descend and attack. Walton is killed. During the battle, Sam begins to hallucinate and imagines herself back in Iraq. As she realizes what is happening is impossible, she wakes up in a hospital room. Libby explains how Sam collapsed upon hearing the scrap yard might be sold and has been in the hospital ever since. Walton, the mercenaries, and the aliens were all in a dream sequence. When Sam leaves the hospital, she decides to return to society.

== Reception ==
The first issue debuted to positive reviews, averaging 8.6/10 based on six critical reviews according to review aggregator Comic Book Roundup. The series as a whole was ranked number 13 on io9's top 15 comics of 2017.

Multiple critics noted how different the writing and art were from Moore's previous works. Writing for ComicWow, Huck Talwar said the series was well-paced. Hassan Otsmane-Elaou agreed in an analysis of the artwork at ComicsAlliance, where he attributed Moore's control of timing to the lack of collaborators. He went on to praise Mike as a narrative device, noting how the amount of space he occupies in a panel represents the degree of Sam's unease in the scene. Halfway through the series, Newsarama reviewer Kat Calamia said the series was good when it "focus[ed] on Sam and the psychological aspects of the story", but felt Moore had not built a strong voice for Walton's group. In a review of the final issue for Multiversity Comics, Nicholas Palmieri said the last minute revelations felt planned and that "Motor Girl [#10] delivered everything you could want out of a concluding issue".

== Prints ==
=== Issues ===
| No. | Release date | Comic Book Roundup rating | Estimated sales (first month) |
|---|---|---|---|
| #1 | November 2016 | 8.6 by six critics. | 11,587, ranked 180th in North America |
| #2 | December 2016 | 10.0 by one critic. | 8,819, ranked 200th in North America |
| #3 | January 2017 | 8.5 by one critic. | 8,458, ranked 205th in North America |
| #4 | March 2017 | 9.0 by two critics. | 7,481, ranked 229th in North America |
| #5 | April 2017 | 7.0 by one critic. | 7,063, ranked 225th in North America |
| #6 | May 2017 | 9.5 by two critics. | 6,790, ranked 260th in North America |
| #7 | July 2017 | 7.0 by one critic. | 6,596, ranked 250th in North America |
| #8 | August 2017 | 8.0 by one critic. | 6,483, ranked 258th in North America |
| #9 | October 2017 | 9.5 by one critic | 6,234, ranked 254th in North America |
| #10 | November 2017 | 9.5 by one critic | 5,879, ranked 254th in North America |

=== Collected editions ===
| Title | Format | Material collected | Publication date | ISBN | Estimated sales (North America) [Trades] |
|---|---|---|---|---|---|
| Real Life | Trade paperback (TPB) | Motor Girl #1-5 | May 2017 | 9781892597632 | 988, ranked 94th the first month 975, ranked 112th second month |
| No Man Left Behind | Trade paperback | Motor Girl #6-10 | December 2017 | 1892597659 | 1403, ranked 72nd |
| Omnibus | Hardcover | Motor Girl #1-10 | March 2018 | 1892597683 | |
