= Echo (comic book) =

American comic book

- Cover to Echo #1

Publication information
- Publisher: Abstract Studio
- Schedule: Monthly
- Format: Ongoing series
- Genre: Science fiction
- Publication date: March 2008 – June 2011
- No. of issues: 30

Creative team
- Created by: Terry Moore
- Written by: Terry Moore
- Artist: Terry Moore

Collected editions
- Moon Lake: ISBN 1-892597-40-3

Echo is an American comic book independently published by Terry Moore under his Abstract Studio imprint. The first issue was released on March 5, 2008 with silver foil accents not to be included on future printings.

Echo's story revolves around Julie, a young photographer who inadvertently discovers a high-tech battle suit. Moore has said the premise of Echo is a woman living in today's America who is dealing with a sudden unbelievable change to her daily life.

== Publication history ==
The first issue was released on March 5, 2008. Echo ran for 30 issues, published on a roughly monthly basis, and concluding in June 2011, with periodic collections of five issues each. Following the series conclusion, a single collection of the entire series was published.

In 2009, the film rights for Echo were purchased by producer Lloyd Levin. The film was initially expected to begin production in late 2011.

In 2017, Moore said Echo is set in the same fictional universe as his other works, Strangers in Paradise, Rachel Rising, and Motor Girl and that the characters may return in the 2018 book Strangers in Paradise XXV.

== Story ==
While taking photographs in the desert, Julie Martin witnesses the explosion of a battle suit and its pilot, the end result of a live munitions exercise. The suit, now reduced to small pellets, rains down on Julie and her pickup truck. The pellets are heavy, landing with significant force and adhere to both Julie and her truck. Julie returns home, still covered in pellets, and listens to a voice mail from her husband, who is insisting she sign divorce papers. Julie attempts to remove the pellets that have stuck to her, only to have the pellets spread and bond to a portion of her body.

Julie decides to seek medical attention to have the metallic substance removed from her body. When she opens the door to her truck more of the pellets bond to her skin. Julie's shoulders and chest are almost completely covered by the metallic substance at this point, and the substance now bears an unknown symbol. When a doctor touches the substance it reacts by removing his fingernail, whereas Julie feels no more than a tingling and some slight warmth. The doctor believes the situation to be a horrible prank, and refuses to treat Julie. Meanwhile, the developers of the battle suit (HeNRI) have confirmed Julie's presence at the scene of the explosion and dispatch a young woman known as Ivy (despite objections from the military) to locate Julie.

Julie is aided by Dillon Murphy, a park ranger who was the boyfriend of Annie, the previous owner of the suit. Ivy eventually teams with Julie and Dillon to help them escape and to stop Dr. Foster of HeNRI, who plans to use the alloy to power a black hole device.

During her long run from the military, Julie discovers several things about her metallic plate. It seems bonded to her nervous system, tapping into her emotional state to achieve several powers, including, but not limited to, a powerful healing ability able to repair physical damage on her body and the ones of people to whom Julie is able to feel a strong empathic bond, or activate lightning to protect her from harm when she's scared or angered. Furthermore, the previous owner of the suit, Annie Trotter, seems to have somehow imprinted her personality in the metal, echoing at times in Julie's mind. The alloy also enhances Julie's physical form, making her noticeably taller and more powerful. Prolonged direct contact by Julie with Ivy also causes Ivy to decrease in physical age to her young teens.

== Characters ==
Julie Martin
Julie is a young photographer living near the desert where she witnesses the destruction of the Beta Suit. She is dealing with several hardships, ranging from delaying her divorce to being unable to feed her dog, Max.
Ivy Raven
An NSB agent called in by Cooper to find Julie Martin, Ivy has a young daughter, Lulu.
Dillon Murphy
Dillon is a California State Park ranger who served in the Army for six years, and Annie's boyfriend. He assists Julie in escaping from HeNRI and the military.
Dr. Annie Trotter
Annie is a scientist at the Heitzer Nuclear Institute (HeNRI) and a test pilot who died field testing the Phi Project suit.
Cain
A homeless drifter who may be the biblical Cain, he is also exposed to the fallout, and his right hand is semi-coated with the alloy. He attacks Julie several times, in a quest to destroy himself.
Professor Foster
Foster is in charge of Phi Project at HeNRI.
Jack Cooper
Jack is professor Foster's assistant at HeNRI, assigned to locate and stop Julie.
Hong Liu
A researcher at HeNRI who builds a weapon to deactivate the Beta Suit, Liu's lower face is blown off in an explosion, and he later tries to deactivate the alloy on Julie.

== Collected editions ==
- Echo: Moon Lake Volume 1 - collects issues #1-5 of the series, plus bonus pages include development sketches and design notes, August 2008, ISBN 1-892597-40-3
- Echo: Atomic Dreams Volume 2 - collects issues #6-10, June 2009, ISBN 1-892597-41-1
- Echo: Desert Run Volume 3 - collects issues #11-15, October 2009, ISBN 1-892597-43-8
- Echo: Collider Volume 4 - collects issues #16-20, April 2010, ISBN 1-892597-44-6
- Echo: Black Hole Volume 5 - collects issues #21-25, December 2010, ISBN 1-892597-46-2
- Echo: The Last Day Volume 6 - collects issues #26-30, July 2011, ISBN 1-892597-47-0
- Echo: The Complete Edition - collects all 30 issues, including covers and the sketch gallery, August 2011, ISBN 978-1-892597-48-9

== See also ==
- Golden ratio base
