= Cavalcade of Boys =

2006 graphic novel written by Tim Fish

- Cover art for the complete collection, 2006

Publication information
- Publisher: Poison Press
- Format: Limited series
- Publication date: 2002–2004 (original series), 2006 (graphic novel)
- No. of issues: Nine

Creative team
- Created by: Tim Fish

Cavalcade of Boys is a comic book miniseries by Tim Fish, featuring the lives and loves of several gay characters in America.

== Publishing history ==
Cavalcade of Boys started as a 9-issue series, published by Tim Fish between 2002 and 2004. It was then collected in three books the following year, and finally in a 550-page graphic novel in 2006.

Fish started an all-new, full-page weekly version of Cavalcade in Boston's LGBT newspaper, Bay Windows, in summer 2007, which was ultimately compiled as the graphic novel Love is the Reason in 2008. Trust/Truth another stand-alone graphic novel featuring Cavalcade characters, was published in 2009.

A French version is also published by H&O Éditions.
