= Future Shock Comics =

American comic strip

Future Shock Comics was a self-syndicated comic strip drawn by Jim McGreal and written by his brother Pat McGreal. The daily strip dealt with science, technology and the world of tomorrow. The comic debuted in September 2009 in the Chicago Villager. It ran in 25 newspapers including the Chicago Tribune and the Pasadena Star News. It was discontinued in 2015.

Future Shock Comics borrowed its name from the 1970 novel Future Shock by Alvin Toffler. It has been described as "H.G. Wells meets Gary Larson".

== History ==
Comic books were a big influence on the McGreal brothers growing up, and this is reflected in the artwork and subject matter of Future Shock. The concept was created by Pat McGreal early in 2009 and was originally titled “In the Near Future.” The intention was to produce a daily single panel cartoon about the future. Frequent themes are the environment, robots, time travel, extraterrestrials, computers and space travel. Future Shock has no reoccurring characters.

In July 2010, a Future Shock cartoon appeared in the science magazine Physics Today. The cartoon parodied a recent discovery of water on the Moon. Two enterprising Moon men are seen bottling water from the Moon River while commenting, “If they pay two bucks for it down there, they’ll surely pay four bucks for it up here!”

In October 2011, the McGreals released their first collection, simply titled Future Shock Comics. In May 2012, the artists were invited to speak at a symposium on the current state of on-line comics sponsored by Chicago's Beverly Arts Council. On December 30, 2012, Future Shock made its debut in the Chicago Tribune. Production was discontinued in 2015.
