= Megatokyo =

English-language webcomic

- Megatokyo volume 1, first edition
- Author(s): Fred Gallagher, Rodney Caston
- Website: megatokyo.com
- Current status/schedule: Active; erratic updates
- Launch date: August 14, 2000
- Publisher(s): Print: Dark Horse Comics; formerly Wildstorm, CMX and Studio Ironcat
- Genre(s): Comedy, drama, action, romance

Megatokyo (メガトーキョー; also stylized as MegaTokyo) is an English-language webcomic created by Fred Gallagher and Rodney Caston. Megatokyo debuted on August 14, 2000, and has been written and illustrated solely by Gallagher since June 17, 2002. Gallagher's style of writing and illustration is heavily influenced by Japanese manga. Megatokyo is freely available on its official website. The intended schedule for updates was for postings twice a week, but new comics are typically posted just once or twice a year on non-specific days. In 2011, updates began being delayed further due to the health issues of Sarah Gallagher (Seraphim), Gallagher's wife. Megatokyo was published in book-format by CMX, although the first three volumes were published by Dark Horse. For February 2005, sales of the comic's third printed volume were ranked third on BookScan's list of graphic novels sold in bookstores, then the best showing for an original English-language manga.

Set in a fictional version of Tokyo, Megatokyo portrays the adventures of Piro, a young fan of anime and manga, and his friend Largo, an American video game enthusiast. The comic often parodies and comments on the archetypes and clichés of anime, manga, dating sims, arcade and video games, occasionally making direct references to real-world works. Megatokyo originally emphasized humor, with continuity of the story a subsidiary concern. Over time, it focused more on developing a complex plot and the personalities of its characters. This transition was due primarily to Gallagher's increasing influence over the comic, which led to Caston choosing to leave the project.

== History ==
Megatokyo began publication as a joint project between Fred Gallagher and Rodney Caston, along with a few internet acquaintances. Gallagher and Caston later became business partners, as well. According to Gallagher, the comic's first two strips were drawn in reaction to Caston being "convinced that he and I could do [a webcomic] ... [and] bothering me incessantly about it", without any planning or pre-determined storyline. The comic's title was derived from an Internet domain owned by Caston, which had hosted a short-lived gaming news site maintained by Caston before the comic's creation. With Caston co-writing the comic's scripts and Gallagher supplying its artwork, the comic's popularity quickly increased, eventually reaching levels comparable to those of such popular webcomics as Penny Arcade and PvP. According to Gallagher, Megatokyo's popularity was not intended, as the project was originally an experiment to help him improve his writing and illustrating skills for his future project, Warmth.

In May 2002, Caston sold his ownership of the title to Gallagher, who has managed the comic on his own since then. In October of the same year, after Gallagher was laid off from his day job as an architect, he took up producing the comic as a full time profession. Caston's departure from Megatokyo was not fully explained at the time. Initially, Gallagher and Caston only briefly mentioned the split, with Gallagher publicly announcing Caston's departure on June 17, 2002. On January 15, 2005, Gallagher explained his view of the reasoning behind the split in response to a comment made by Scott Kurtz of PvP, in which he suggested that Gallagher had stolen ownership of Megatokyo from Caston. Calling Kurtz's claim "mean spirited", Gallagher responded:

While things were good at first, over time we found that we were not working well together creatively. There is no fault in this, it happens. I've never blamed Rodney for this creative "falling out" nor do I blame myself. Not all creative relationships click, ours didn't in the long run.

Four days later, Caston posted his view of the development on his website:

After this he approached me and said either I would sell him my ownership of MegaTokyo or he would simply stop doing it entirely, and we'd divide up the company's assets and end it all. This was right before the MT was to go into print form, and I really wanted to see it make it into print, rather [than] die on the vine.

In May 2011, it was announced that Endgames (a gameworld existing within Megatokyo) was being revamped in a light novel format, with a story written by webfiction author Thomas Knapp, with four light novels planned. A short story "Behind the Masque" was also announced, and released on Amazon's Kindle Store on June 10, 2011.

=== Production ===
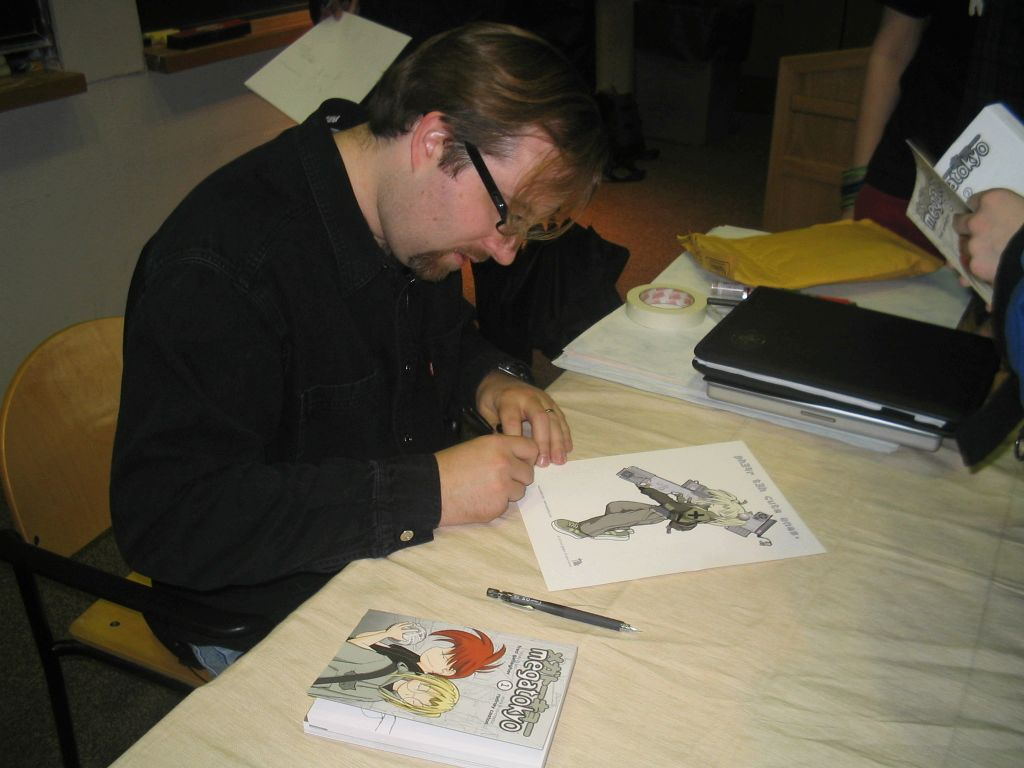
Creator Fred Gallagher in 2004

Megatokyo is usually hand-drawn in pencil by Fred Gallagher, without any digital or physical "inking". Inking was originally planned, but dropped as Gallagher decided it was unfeasible. Megatokyo's first strips were created by roughly sketching on large sheets of paper, followed by tracing, scanning, digital clean-up of the traced comics with Adobe Photoshop, and final touches in Adobe Illustrator to achieve a finished product. Gallagher has stated that tracing was necessary because his sketches were not neat enough to use before tracing. Because of the tracing necessary, these comics regularly took six to eight hours to complete. As the comic progressed, Gallagher became able to draw "cleaner" comics without rough lines and tracing lines, and was able to abandon the tracing step. Gallagher believes "that this eventually led to better looking and more expressive comics".

Megatokyo's early strips were laid out in four square panels per strip, in a two-by-two square array – a formatting choice made as a compromise between the horizontal layout of American comic strips and the vertical layout of Japanese comic strips. The limitations of this format became apparent during the first year of Megatokyo's publication, and in the spring of 2001, the comic switched to a manga-style, free-form panel layout. This format allowed for both large, detailed drawings and small, abstract progressions, as based on the needs of the script. Gallagher has commented that his drawing speed had increased since the comic's beginning, and with four panel comics taking much less time to produce, it "made sense in some sort of twisted, masochistic way, that [he] could use that extra time to draw more for each comic".

Megatokyo's earliest strips were drawn entirely on single sheets of paper. Following these, Gallagher began drawing the comic's panels separately and assembling them in Adobe Illustrator, allowing him to draw more detailed frames. This changed during Megatokyo's eighth chapter, with Gallagher returning to drawing entire comics on single sheets of paper. Gallagher stated that this change allowed for more differentiated layouts, in addition to allowing him a better sense of momentum during comic creation.

The strip is currently drawn on inkjet paper in pencil, the text and speech being added later with Adobe Photoshop or Illustrator. In March 2009, he began Fredarting, a streaming live video feed of the comic being drawn.

Gallagher occasionally has guest artists participate in the production of the comic.

=== Revenue ===
Megatokyo has had several sources of funding during its production. In its early years, it was largely funded by Gallagher and Caston's full time jobs, with the additional support of banner advertisements. A store connected to ThinkGeek was launched during October 2000 in order to sell Megatokyo merchandise, and, in turn, help fund the comic. On August 1, 2004, this store was replaced by "Megagear", an independent online store created by Fred Gallagher and his wife, Sarah, to be used by Megatokyo, although it later offered Applegeeks and Angerdog merchandise as well.

Gallagher emphasized in 2004 that Megatokyo will remain on the Internet free of charge, and that releasing it in book form is simply another way for the comic to reach readers, as opposed to replacing its webcomic counterpart entirely.

== Themes and structure ==
Strip #619 demonstrates Megatokyo's style and several of the comic's themes. It depicts Piro, Largo, Sonoda Yuki, and Nanasawa Kimiko.

Much of Megatokyo's early humor consists of jokes related to the video game subculture, as well as culture-clash issues. In these early strips, the comic progressed at a pace which Gallagher has called "haphazard", often interrupted by purely punchline-driven installments. As Gallagher gradually gained more control over Megatokyo's production, the comic began to gain more similarities to the Japanese shōjo (girls') manga that Gallagher enjoys. Following Gallagher's complete takeover of Megatokyo, the comic's thematic relation to Japanese manga continued to grow.

The comic features characteristics borrowed from anime and manga archetypes, often parodying the medium's clichés. Examples include Junpei, a ninja who becomes Largo's apprentice; Rent-a-zillas, giant monsters based on Godzilla; the Tokyo Police Cataclysm Division, which fights the monsters with giant robots and supervises the systematic destruction and reconstruction of predesignated areas of the city; fan service; a Japanese school girl, Yuki, who has also started being a magical girl in recent comics; and Ping, a robot girl. In addition, Dom and Ed, hitmen employed by Sega and Sony, respectively, are associated with a Japanese stereotype that all Americans are heavily armed.

Characters in Megatokyo usually speak Japanese, although some speak English, or English-based l33t. Typically, when a character is speaking Japanese, it is signified by enclosing English text between angle brackets (<>). Not every character speaks every language, so occasionally characters are unable to understand one another. In several scenes, a character's speech is written entirely in rōmaji Japanese to emphasize this.

Megatokyo is divided into chapters. Chapter 0, which contains all of the comic's early phase, covers a time span in the comic of about six weeks. Each of the subsequent chapters chronicles the events of a single day. Chapter 0 was originally not given a title, although the book version retroactively dubbed it "Relax, we understand j00." Between the chapters, and occasionally referenced in the main comic, are a number of omake (extras).

== Main characters ==
=== Piro ===
Piro, the protagonist, is an author surrogate of Fred Gallagher. Gallagher has stated that Piro is an idealized version of himself when he was in college. As a character, he is socially inept and frequently depressed. His design was originally conceived as a visual parody of the character Ruri Hoshino, from the Martian Successor Nadesico anime series. His name is derived from Gallagher's online nickname, which was in turn taken from Makoto Sawatari's cat in the Japanese visual novel Kanon.

In the story, Piro has extreme difficulty understanding Megatokyo's female characters, making him for the most part ignorant of the feelings that the character Nanasawa Kimiko has for him, though he has become much more aware of her attraction as the series progressed. Gallagher has commented that Piro is the focal point of emotional damage, while his friend, Largo, takes the physical damage in the comic.

=== Largo ===
Largo is the comic's secondary protagonist, and the comic version of co-creator Rodney Caston. An impulsive alcoholic whose speech is rendered in L33t frequently, he serves as one of the primary sources of comic relief. A technologically gifted character, he is obsessed with altering devices, often with hazardous results. Gallagher designed Largo to be the major recipient of the comic's physical damage. Largo's name comes from Caston's online nickname, which refers to the villain from Bubblegum Crisis. For various reasons (including fire and battle damage) he often ends up wearing very little clothing. Largo seems to have awkwardly blundered into a relatively successful relationship with Hayasaka Erika at the current time in the comic.

=== Hayasaka Erika ===
Hayasaka Erika (早坂 えりか) is a strong-willed, cynical, and sometimes violent character. At the time of the story, she is a former popular Japanese idol (singer) and voice actress who has been out of the spotlight for three years, though she still possesses a considerable fanbase. Erika's past relationship troubles, combined with exposure to swarms of fanboys, have caused her to adopt a negative outlook on life. Gallagher has implied that her personality was loosely based on the tsundere (tough girl) stereotype often seen in anime and manga.

=== Nanasawa Kimiko ===
Nanasawa Kimiko (七澤 希美子) is a Japanese girl who previously worked as a waitress at an Anna Miller's restaurant, and is Piro's romantic interest. At the current point in the story, she is a voice actress for the possibly-failing Lockart game "Sight", playing the main heroine, Kannazuki Kotone. Kimiko is a kind and soft-spoken character, though she is prone to mood-swings, and often causes herself embarrassment by saying things she does not mean. Gallagher has commented that Kimiko was the only female character not based entirely on anime stereotypes.

=== Tohya Miho ===
Tohya Miho (凍耶 美穂, Tōya Miho) is an enigmatic and manipulative young goth girl. She is drawn to resemble a "Gothic Lolita", and is often described as "darkly cute", with Gallagher occasionally describing her as a "perkigoth". Miho often acts strangely compared to the comic's other characters, and regularly accomplishes abnormal feats, such as leaping inhuman distances or perching herself atop telephone poles. Despite these displays of ability, it is hinted at that Miho has problems with her health. Little is revealed in the comic about Miho's past or motivations, although Gallagher states that these will eventually be explained. Largo believes that she (Miho) is the queen of the undead, and is the cause of the zombie invasion of Tokyo. It has been hinted that she is a magical girl who may have some past connection with the zombies. She is apparently killed in a robotic beam attack by Ed, but nine days later is found in the hospital reading and eating with no obvious signs of physical damage. More possibilities exist that she is some type of game prototype or archetype.

== Plot ==
Megatokyo's story begins when Piro and Largo fly to Tokyo after an incident at the Electronic Entertainment Expo (E3). Piro has the proper paperwork; Largo must beat the ninja Junpei at a video game to enter. After a spending spree, the pair are stranded without enough money to buy plane tickets home, forcing them to live with Tsubasa, a Japanese friend of Piro's. When Tsubasa suddenly departs for America to seek his "first true love", the protagonists are forced out of the apartment. Tsubasa leaves Ping, a robot girl PlayStation 2 accessory, in their care. This leads to old friends of Piro and Largo showing up later. The two are shadow operatives for video game companies, Ed (Sony) and Dom (SEGA).

At one point, Piro, confronted with girl troubles, visits the local bookstore to "research"—look in the vast shelves of shōjo manga for a solution to his problem. A spunky schoolgirl, Sonoda Yuki, and her friends, Asako and Mami, see him sitting amidst piles of read manga, and ask him what he is doing. Piro, flustered, runs away, accidentally leaving behind his bookbag and sketchbook.

After their eviction, Piro begins work at "Megagamers", a store specializing in anime, manga, and video games. His employer allows him and Largo to live in the apartment above the store. Largo is mistaken for the new English teacher at a local school, where he takes on the alias "Great Teacher Largo" and instructs his students in L33t, video games, and about computers. Yuki's father, Inspector Sonada Masamichi of the "Tokyo Police Cataclysm Division" (TPCD) hires Largo after Largo manipulates Ping into stopping a rampaging monster, the drunken turtle Gameru.

As Largo is working at the local high school, Piro encounters Yuki again while working at Megagamers, when she returns his bookbag and sketchbook, scribbled all over with comments about his drawings. She then, to his consternation, asks if he would give her drawing lessons. Piro, flustered, agrees, and promptly forgets about them.

Earlier in the story, Piro had seen Nanasawa Kimiko at an Anna Miller's restaurant, where she is a waitress, after Tsubasa brought him and Largo there. Later on, Piro encounters Kimiko outside a train station, where she is worrying aloud that she will miss an audition because she has forgotten her money and railcard. Piro hands her his own railcard and walks off before she can refuse his offer. This event causes Kimiko to develop an idealized vision of her benefactor, an image which is shattered the next time they meet. Despite this, she gradually develops feelings for Piro, though she is too shy to admit them. Later on in the story, Kimiko's outburst on a radio talk show causes her to suddenly rise to idol status. Angered by the hosts' derisive comments about fanboys, she comes to the defense of her audience, immediately and unintentionally securing their obsessive adoration. Later, her new horde of fanboys find out where she works and flock to the restaurant, obsessively trying to get pictures up her skirt. Piro works undercover as a busboy to get rid of all cameras. The scene eventually builds to a climax, in which Kimiko shouts at the fanboys and lifts her skirt in defiance, and they take photographs. Piro, provoked by her outburst into actively defending her, threatens the fanboy crowd, and collects all of their memory cards with the photos. On the way back from the restaurant, Kimiko is suffering from the aftermath of the scene and lashes out at Piro on the subway, which causes him to walk off.

Meanwhile, Largo develops a relationship with Hayasaka Erika, Piro's coworker at Megagamers. She and Kimiko share a house. As with Piro and Kimiko, Largo and Erika meet by coincidence early in the story. Later, it is revealed that Erika is a former pop idol, who caused a big scene then disappeared from the public eye after her fiancé left her. When she is rediscovered by her fans, Largo helps thwart a fanboy horde, but not well enough to escape being dismissed by the TPCD for it. He then offers to help Erika to deal with her "vulnerabilities in the digital plane". Erika insists on protecting herself, so Largo instructs her in computer-building. This leads into a little more relationship than Largo can handle, partly because he insists all computer building be done in the nude or as close to it as possible, to avoid static electrical discharge ruining components, and partly because his behavior, crude though it may appear, impresses Erika in many ways.

The enigmatic Tohya Miho frequently meddles in the lives of the protagonists. Miho knows Piro and Largo from the Endgames MMORPG previous to Megatokyo's plot. She abused a hidden statistic in the game to gain control of nearly all of the game's player characters, but was ultimately defeated by Piro and Largo. In the comic, Miho becomes close friends with Ping, influencing Ping's relationship with Piro and pitting Ping against Largo in video game battles. Miho is also involved in Erika's backstory; Miho manipulated Erika's fans after Erika's disappearance. This effort ended badly, leaving Miho hospitalized, and the TPCD cleaning up the aftermath. Most of the exact details of what happened are left to the readers' imagination, as are her current motivations and ultimate goal. Miho and many of the events surrounding her involve a club in Harajuku, the Cave of Evil (CoE).

After getting yelled at for retaining her waitress job, Kimiko quits her voice acting job and goes home to find Erika assembling a new computer in her undergarments. Not long after Erika tells Kimiko to strip, Piro comes by, who she tells to get undressed as well. While Erika and Piro talk about her, Kimiko, who hid when Piro showed up, runs out of the apartment. Kimiko runs into Ping, who wanted to talk to Piro about why, after an explosion at school, she had started to cry uncontrollably. They encounter Largo at the store, who explains what went wrong, although no one knows what he means until Piro comes in and translates. Ping is relieved to know that she will not shut down and Kimiko hugs Piro and apologizes for her actions. Largo leaves for Erika's apartment after she calls looking for help. That night, while Piro and Kimiko fall asleep watching TV, Erika, who finished the computer with Largo's help, tries to seduce Largo, but it freaks him out and he runs out for home. The next morning, after Kimiko departs, Piro finds out she quit her voice acting job and tries to find her.

Kimiko and Miho are in the same diner, to which Ed has sent an attack robot (Kill-Bot) against Miho, since she has disrupted his attempts to destroy Ping. Miho is in the diner trying to contact Piro, Kimiko is talking with Erika. Dom is also there to talk with Kimiko. After rescuing both herself and Kimiko from the Kill-Bot and chaos at the diner, the two talk about things. Miho talks to Piro on her phone, argues with him, and then Piro and Kimiko have a conversation about that as the two females are leaving the area. Dom follows and tries to coerce Kimiko into joining SEGA for protection from fans, but she refuses. Drained, she has Miho finish talking to Piro on the phone. Piro then encounters a group who found Kimiko's cell phone and other belongings after she and Miho escaped the diner. The group wants to help Piro get together with Kimiko, partially due to feeling bad for trying to snap a picture up Kimiko's skirt. Piro and the group set out for a press conference Kimiko is going to for the voice acting project, Sight. Besides all of the other fans going to the event, a planned zombie outbreak occurs in the area. Miho, who helped Kimiko get ready for the event and accompanied her to it, later calls the zombies off for unexplained reasons through an unexplained mechanism.

Largo and Yuki, who has since been revealed along the way to be a magical girl like her mother Meimi (likewise revealed), steal a Rent-a-Zilla to fight the zombie outbreak. Largo leaves Yuki to help Piro get to Kimiko. Unfortunately, the Rent-a-Zilla gets bitten by zombies and turns into one itself, resulting in the TPCD capturing it. Yuki protects it from the TPCD, teleports it out of the area, and adopts it as a pet in a miniaturized form, all much to her father's chagrin.

After the event, Erika, Largo, Kimiko and Piro are reunited, and they talk a bit with Miho, who has shown up again after storming out following an argument with Kenji earlier. Miho declines an offer to eat with the group and wanders off thinking about games and Largo and Piro. She is shown walking amongst the zombies and then in Ed's gun-sights, and in the center of an attack by a number of Ed's Kill-Bots.

During the next nine days, Piro and Kimiko have made up and Kimiko returned to both of her jobs, with them seeing little of each other. Largo and Erika are shown to likewise be involved but more often, including going to dinner with the Sonoda family, as the inspector's brother was Erika's fiancé. Kimiko is attempting to get Piro working as an artist on Sight, which unbeknownst to them is now being funded by Dom. Ping is concerned about the whereabouts of Miho, who has not been seen during the time, but Piro is still upset about all that has happened and somewhat evasively refuses direct assistance. Ping and Junko, another one of Largo's students, who used to be a friend of Miho, work towards finding Miho. Yuki and Kobayashi Yutaka then also become involved with the attempt because of this. That night, Piro and Kimiko discuss Miho and Endgames, which Yuki overhears, they unaware she is there. This leads Yuki to appropriate Piro's powerless laptop and leave, believing him to still be in love with Miho and that the device might hold clues to finding her. Kimiko and Piro work on his portfolio for Sight and then they say goodnight and leave. He returns to his apartment, but Kimiko goes to the CoE club using a pass Miho gave her long ago in the beginning. Once at the club, Dom mockingly advises her, Yuki unknowingly whisps past her, and she unexpectedly meets up with an old friend Komugiko. During all this, Piro has left his apartment after looking at his sketchbook and a drawing of Miho. His current location is unknown.

Aside from Kimiko, concurrent overlapping events have led to almost every main character converging upon the club for various reasons involving Miho, or in support of others involved. Ed, attempting to destroy Ping, fights with Largo, as the staff of the club have maneuvered Ed and Ping into the protective radius of ex-Idol Erika. Yuki and Yutaka get Piro's laptop powered on, she reads the old chat logs between Piro and Miho, and follows instructions from her to him. Going to a "hidden-in-plain-sight" hospital room, she finds Miho alive and well, although seemingly in a weakened state. During a heated argument and Miho's goading, Yuki then forcibly moves Miho to the club. Shortly after the arrival of the two in the center of everyone, the bulk of the denizens go into trance-like states while others are fighting or confused about what to do next. Miho appears to be collapsing. Upon instructions from Erika, Largo finds then uses his Largo-Phone and the club's sound system to knock out power in the immediate area of the club. During this event, Piro has gone to visit Miho at the "hospital" room, where he discovers that she is missing. Following the blackout, Largo, Erika, and Miho board a train, where Miho decides to return home. However, a large crowd has blocked her path home, apparently waiting for someone's return.

The next morning, Piro has been brought to jail, where he has been interrogated by police about Miho's disappearance. He is able to leave jail by paying a suspiciously set low bail of about $100 US, which is obtained through a 10,000 yen bill that has been shaped into an origami 'zilla and left in the cell. Piro walks back home, where he finds Miho sleeping on a beanbag in the apartment. Piro and Miho then work out some of the confusion between them, which reveals several background events. She explains the Analogue Support Facility as a sort of safehouse, where she was able to come and go when she wanted. Since Ping in her extreme attempt to find Miho had posted tons of pictures, videos, and information on the internet, people are now using that to "build a 'real' me", as Miho explains it. During the process, at one point Kimiko calls from the studio, updating Piro on his artwork and telling him some of how last night she and others found Miho and how crazy it was. Largo and Erika, who are riding on the roof of a train in the Miyagi prefecture also call during the conversation. After a short conversation with both Largo and Erika on the phone, and a bit more conversation with Miho, Piro instructs her to stay in the apartment until they can figure out what to do. Junko and Ping are shown leaving for school, with Junko seeming taking Ed's shotguns from last night with her.

After receiving a phone call from Yutaka, whom Masamichi initially disapproves of, Yuki, who has not changed clothing from the events of the previous chapter, leaves her house, grabs him, and takes him to a rooftop, where they try to explain things after Yutaka was being questioned by Asako and Mami. She goes over everything, even why she referred to herself as a "monster", which Yuki's friends previously overheard and misunderstood. Realizing that Miho is the cause of this mess, Yutaka indirectly vows revenge, but Yuki stops him. Yutaka goes anyway and meets his brother in front of Megagamers, who has tracked Miho to the store since the previous night. Yutaka's brother is a member of a group of Nanasawa fans who plan to intervene and remind Piro who his true love is to get rid of Miho. However, Dom's van is blocking the store's entrance. Though Yuki protests against intervention to the group, Dom, who is unknown to them, performs his own method of intervention anyway and forces Piro to choose between Nanasawa and Miho. It is currently unknown if Dom knows who Miho is, but Miho, in a disguise, overhears the conversation and forces Piro to briefly wear a hat. At the same time, Yuki, deciding that she can wait no longer, steals Dom's van and guns, and rushes into the store with Yutaka in tow. Seeing this, Miho grabs Piro and rushes upstairs, discarding the hat in the process. Yuki subsequently collides with the hat and a presumed explosion occurs, stalling Yuki and Yutaka. Miho and Piro don cosplay outfits as a disguise, escape, and make their way to the local bath house. Just before Yuki grabs Yutaka again, Dom, now trapped under a pile of rubble, expresses his condolences to Yutaka, to which he does not understand. The pair quickly follow Miho and Piro and await for them to leave the bath house.

== Books ==
Megatokyo was first published in print by Studio Ironcat, a partnership announced in September 2002. Following this, the first book, a compilation of Megatokyo strips under the title Megatokyo Volume One: Chapter Zero, was released by Studio Ironcat in January 2003. According to Gallagher, Studio Ironcat was unable to meet demand for the book, due to problems the company was facing at the time. On July 7, 2003, Gallagher announced that Ironcat would not continue to publish Megatokyo in book form. This was followed by an announcement on August 27, 2003, that Dark Horse Comics would publish Megatokyo Volume 2 and future collected volumes, including a revised edition of Megatokyo Volume 1. The comic once more changed publishers in February 2006, moving from Dark Horse Comics to the CMX Manga imprint of DC Comics. The comic then transferred to CMX's parent Wildstorm, with its last volume published in July 2010. CMX, along with Wildstorm closed down in 2010. Former publisher Dark Horse regained the rights to the series and planned to release it in omnibus format in January 2013, but did not.

As of July 2010, six volumes are available for purchase: volumes 1 through 3 from Dark Horse, volumes 4 and 5 by CMX/DC, and volume 6 by Wildstorm. The books have also been translated into German, Italian, French, and Polish. In July 2004, Megatokyo was the tenth best-selling manga property in the United States, and during the week ending February 20, 2005, volume 3 ranked third in the Nielsen BookScan figures, which was not only its highest ranking to date (as of August 2006), but also made it the highest monthly rank for an original English-language manga title.

In July 2007, Kodansha announced that in 2008 it intends to publish Megatokyo in a Japanese-language edition, (in a silver slipcased box as part of Kodansha Box editions, a new manga line started in November 2006). Depending on reader response, Kodansha hoped to subsequently publish the entire Megatokyo book series. The first volume was released in Japan on May 7, 2009.

No.	Title	Release date	ISBN
01	Megatokyo Volume 1: Chapter Zero (1st edition)	January 2003	1-929090-30-7
01	Megatokyo Volume 1 (2nd edition)	31 March 2004	1-59307-163-9
02	Megatokyo Volume 2	21 January 2004	1-59307-118-3
03	Megatokyo Volume 3	2 February 2005	1-59307-305-4
04	Megatokyo Volume 4	21 June 2006	1-4012-1126-7
05	Megatokyo Volume 5	23 May 2007	1-4012-1127-5
06	Megatokyo Volume 6	14 July 2010	1-4012-2481-4

== Reception ==
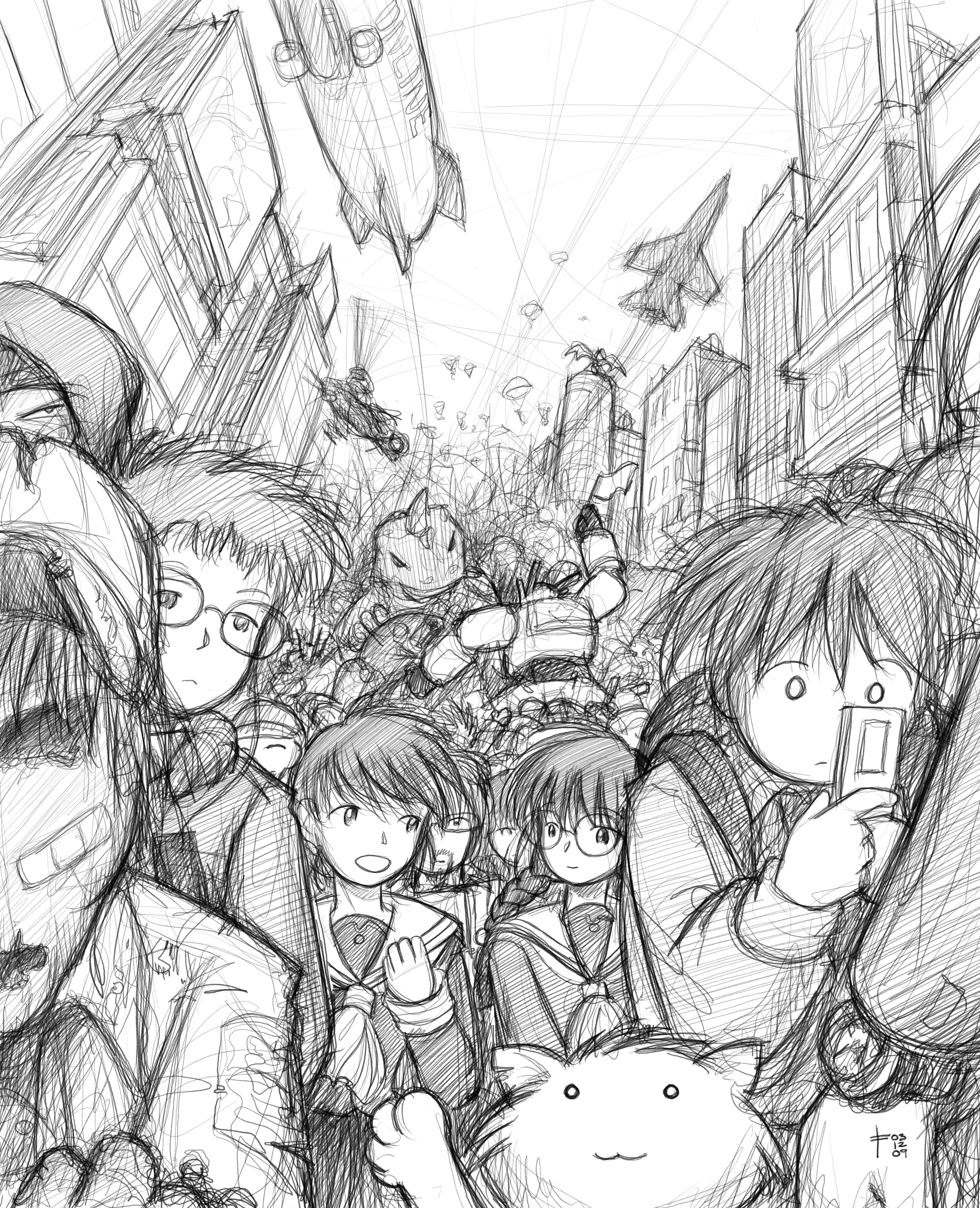
The grayscale artwork in Megatokyo has received praise from critics in The New York Times and elsewhere.

The artwork and characterizations of Megatokyo have received praise from such publications as The New York Times and Comics Bulletin. Many critics praise Megatokyo's character designs and pencil work, rendered entirely in grayscale; conversely, it has been criticized for perceived uniformity and simplicity in the designs of its peripheral characters, which have been regarded as confusing and difficult to tell apart due to their similar appearances.

Eric Burns, on his blog Websnark, said that the comic suffered from "incredibly slow pacing" (from 2000–2009, only about two months of in-universe time elapsed), a lack of resolution for plot threads, and an erratic update schedule. He also complained that updates should have become more frequent and consistent after Gallagher took on Megatokyo as a full-time occupation, which did not happen.

IGN called Megatokyo's fans "some of the most patient and forgiving in the webcomic world." During an interview, Gallagher stated that Megatokyo fans "always [tell him] they are patient and find that the final comics are always worth the wait," but he feels as though he "[has] a commitment to [his] readers and to [himself] to deliver the best comics [he] can, and to do it on schedule," finally saying that nothing would make him happier than "[getting] a better handle on the time it takes to create each page." Upon missing deadlines, Gallagher often makes self-disparaging comments. Poking fun at this, Jerry "Tycho" Holkins of Penny Arcade has claimed to have "gotten on famously" with Gallagher, ever since he "figured out that [Gallagher] legitimately detests himself and is not hoisting some kind of glamour."

While Megatokyo was originally presented as a slapstick comedy, it began focusing more on the romantic relationships between its characters after Caston's departure from the project. As a result, some fans, preferring the comic's gag-a-day format, have claimed its quality was superior when Caston was writing it. Additionally, it has been said that, without Caston's input, Largo's antics appear contrived. Comics Bulletin regards Megatokyo's characters as convincingly portrayed, commenting that "the reader truly feels connected to the characters, their romantic hijinks, and their wacky misadventures with the personal touches supplied by the author." Likewise, Anime News Network has praised the personal tone in which the comic is written, stating that much of its appeal is a result of the "friendly and casual feeling of a fan-made production."

Gallagher states early in Megatokyo Volume 1 that he and Caston "didn't want the humor ... to rely too heavily on what might be considered 'obscure knowledge.'" An article in The New York Times insists that such scenarios were unavoidable, commenting that the comic "sits at the intersection of several streams of obscure knowledge," including "gaming and hacking; manga ... the boom in Web comics over the past few years; and comics themselves." The article also held that "Gallagher doesn't mean to be exclusive ... he graciously offers translation of the strip's later occasional lapses into l33t ... [and] explains why the characters are occasionally dressed in knickers or as rabbits." The newspaper went on to argue that "The pleasure of a story like Megatokyo comes not in its novelistic coherence, but in its loose ranginess."

Megatokyo was nominated in at least one category of the Web Cartoonists' Choice Awards every year from 2001 through 2007. It won Best Comic in 2002, as well as Best Writing, Best Serial Comic, and Best Dramatic Comic. The largest number of nominations it has received in one year is 14 in 2003, when it won Outstanding Environment Design. The series tied with Svetlana Chmakova's Dramacon for the 2007 Best Continuing OEL Manga.
