= Terry Moore (cartoonist) =

American cartoonist

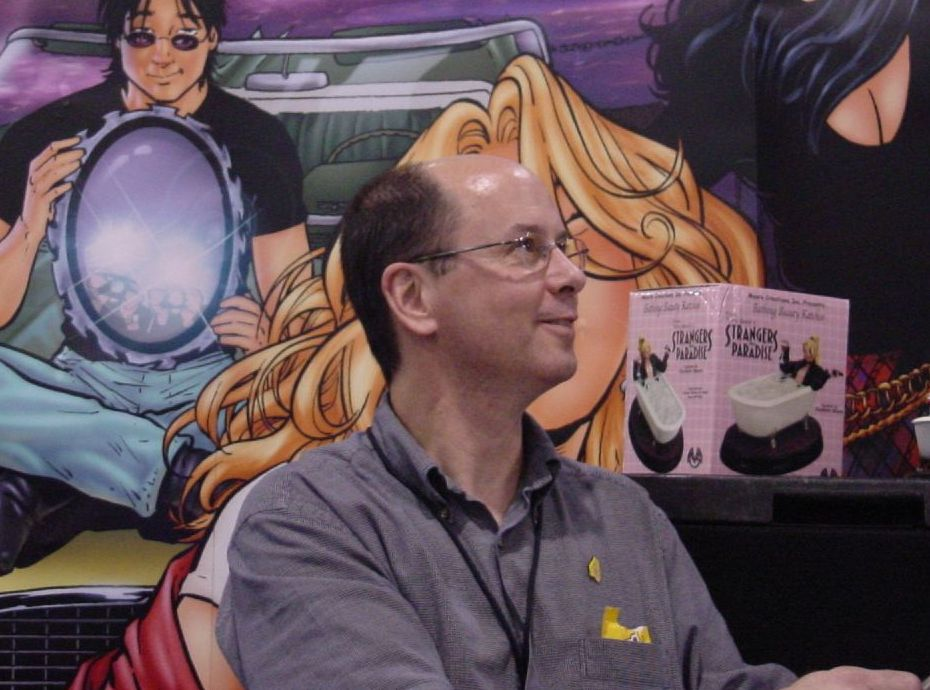
- Moore at Heroes Con 2006
- Born: Terry Moore; 1954 (age 71–72) Texas, U.S.
- Notable works: Strangers in Paradise; Echo; Rachel Rising; Motor Girl
- Awards: 1996 Eisner Award (Best Serialized Story); 2003 Reuben Award (Comic Books Silver Reuben Division Awards); 2014 Harvey Award (Best Lettering); 2015 Harvey Award (Best Cartoonist); 2024 Inkwell Awards (S.P.A.M.I. Award)

Terry Moore (born 1954) is an American cartoonist, known for the series Strangers in Paradise, Rachel Rising, and the founding of Homage Comics. His work has won him recognition in the comics industry, including the Eisner Award for Best Serialized Story in 1996 for Strangers in Paradise #1–8, which was collected in the trade paperback I Dream of You.

== Early life ==
Moore was born in Texas and he grew up in the Southern United States, Africa, and England. His younger sister was born while his family lived in Africa. He started drawing in sketchbooks when he was eight, and when he was thirteen, he learned to play the electric guitar. He has said his greatest career influence is Peanuts' Charles Schulz.

While working as a musician, Moore met and married his wife. When they decided to have a family, he took a more stable job as a video editor. He moved into cartooning when he became tired of editing.

== Career ==
Following the examples of independent comic creators like Dave Sim and Jeff Smith, Terry Moore decided to publish Strangers in Paradise himself through his own Houston-based Abstract Studio imprint.

In 2008, Moore wrote and drew covers for all five issues of Marvel Comics's Spider-Man Loves Mary Jane vol. 2. The following year, he began writing Runaways vol. 2, also for Marvel. This run lasted for nine issues.

The first issue of his next self-published series, Echo was released on March 5, 2008. Echo ran for 30 issues and concluded in June 2011. It was followed in August 2011 by Rachel Rising, a 42-issue horror comic which won the 2014 Harvey Award for Best Lettering and 2015 award for Best Cartoonist in addition to several other nominations. It was also nominated for an Eisner Award in the categories Best Continuing Series (2012), Best Writer/Artist (2012, 2014), and Best Letterer (2014). His next book, Motor Girl, ran for 10 issues between November 2016 and November 2017.

Moore was featured in The Cartoonist, a 2009 documentary film on the life and work of Jeff Smith, creator of Bone. Moore was nominated in 2016 for the Inkwell Awards All-in-One Award.

Moore has expressed a desire to do a syndicated cartoon strip in the authors notes at the back of the Strangers in Paradise collection books. Some of Moore's strip work has been published in Paradise, Too! and as a second feature in select issues of Rachel Rising.

== Bibliography ==
=== Abstract Studio ===
Titles published by Abstract Studio include:

Strangers in Paradise (1993–2007):

- Strangers in Paradise vol. 1, 3 issues (1993–1994)
- Strangers in Paradise vol. 2, 13 issues (1994–1996)
- Strangers in Paradise vol. 3, 90 issues (1996–2007)

Paradise, Too! 14 issues (2000–2003)

- Drunk Ducks (2002)
- Checking for Weirdos (2003)

Echo 30 issues (2008–2011):

- Volume 1: MoonLake (2008)
- Volume 2: Atomic Dreams (2009)
- Volume 3: Desert Run (2009)
- Volume 4: Collider (2010)
- Volume 5: Black Hole (2010)
- Volume 6: Last Day (2011)

Rachel Rising 42 issues (2011–2016):

- Volume 1: The Shadow of Death (2012), ISBN 1-892597-51-9
- Volume 2: Fear No Malus (2012), ISBN 1-892597-52-7
- Volume 3: Cemetery Songs (2013), ISBN 1-892597-55-1
- Volume 4: Winter Graves (2014), ISBN 1-892597-56-X
- Volume 5: Night Cometh (2015), ISBN 1-892597-57-8
- Volume 6: Secrets Kept (2015), ISBN 88-6543-538-0
- Volume 7: Dust to Dust (2016), ISBN 1-892597-60-8

How to Draw 4 issues (2012)

- Terry Moore's How To Draw (2012)
- Terry Moore's How To Draw Expanded Edition (2020)

SIP Kids 4 issues (2016)

Motor Girl 10 issues (2016–2017)

- Volume 1: Real Life (2017)
- Volume 2: No Man Left Behind (2017)

Strangers in Paradise XXV (2018)

- Volume 1: The Chase (2018)
- Volume 2: Hide And Seek (2019)

Five Years (Abstract Studio, 2019)

- Volume 1: Fire In The Sky (2019)
- Volume 2: Stalemate (2020)

Ever (2020)

Serial 10 issues (2021)

- Volume 1: The Glass Tomb (2021)
- Volume 2: Cat & Mouse (2022)

Parker Girls 10 issues (2023)

=== Other publishers ===
Titles published by various publishers include: Caliber Comics:

- Negative Burn #13 (1994)

Alternative comics:

- Original cover art for Dan DeBono's Indy #12 (c. 1995)

Image Comics:

- Lady Supreme #1-2 (1996)
- The Darkness/Vampirella 1-shot (2005)

WildStorm:

- Gen 13 Bootleg #5-6 (1997)

Dark Horse Comics:

- Star Wars Tales #5 (2000)
- Buffy the Vampire Slayer: Willow and Tara 1-shot (2001)

DC Comics:

- DC First: Batgirl/Joker #1 (2002)
- Birds of Prey #47-49 (2002)

Marvel Comics:

- Ultimate Marvel Team-Up #14 (2002)
- Spider-Man Loves Mary Jane vol. 2 (2008-2009)
- Runaways vol. 3 #1-9 (2008–2009)
- Strange Tales II #3 (2011)

Vertigo Comics:

- Fables #107 (2011)

Bongo Comics:

- Treehouse of Horror #12 (2006)

| Preceded by Chuck Dixon | Birds of Prey writer 2002 | Succeeded by Gilbert Hernandez |
| Preceded by Joss Whedon | Runaways writer 2008–2009 | Succeeded by Kathryn Immonen |
