= Berona's War =

Book series

- Cover of Berona's Hundred Year War
- Author: Anthony Coffey and Jesse Labbé
- Publisher: Archaia Studios Press

Berona's War is a book series created by Anthony Coffey and Jesse Labbé and published by Archaia Studios Press. Released books include Berona's Hundred Year War, Berona's War: Field Guide & Berona's War: Cabbalu Tales - Vol. 1: Without Perfection. Additional writers include Bret Kenyon and Opie Cooper.

Critics noted Berona's War: Field Guide for its unique presentation and narrative structure.

== Reception and analysis ==
Jonathan H. Liu of Wired explains that Berona's War: Field Guide "doesn't tell a traditional narrative, but instead presents the various creatures and weaponry as entries in the guide in an ever-escalating fashion." He concludes, "it's a fine introduction to this bizarre little world."

According to Publishers Weekly, "The book itself looks like an deliberately unpolished draft of a role-playing-game manual." They conclude, "The art is lovely, though, with strong design and a real feel for the world."

Michael Roberts of Comics Bulletin writes, "Although I was a little disappointed not to see any story material beyond the notes and maps, I am incredibly interested to see how the Berona War will go."

== Books ==
The book series documents various information on two factions at war on the Isle of Berona, as well as information on the continent's makeup. This information ranges from "units" and weaponry used by the factions to try to eliminate the other, as well as topography of the continent on which they wage their bloody war.

Berona's Hundred Year War and Berona's War: Field Guide document the various "heroes", weaponry, and other aspects of the war. These books are written more like a journal or documentary and set the tone for the stories to come.

Berona's War: Cabbalu Tales - Vol. 1: Without Perfection is a collection of stories from the war going on between the Ele-Alta and the Cropones. The book contains less pictures than the previous two but it isn't devoid of them either.

Berona's War: Fight for Amity is structured in a more comic book style and has recollections from the war.

Berona's Hundred Year War and Berona's War: Field Guide are essentially the same book, with the Field Guide being the 2nd Edition of the Berona's Hundred Year War, with different cover art and additional material.

== Story ==
On the Isle of Berona, peace no longer exists.

The Ele-Alta [El-Eh-All-Tuh] and the Cropone [Kra-Pohn] are at war, known from this point on as the "Hundred Year War". This war was triggered by a dispute over land and has since become more and more violent. Many stories have emerged from these battles, with many more not yet recanted to outsiders.

=== Factions ===
Ele-Alta:

- Powerful, hard-working
- Close knit group (no divide within the society)
- Indigenous to the mountainous region of Berona

Cropone:

- Highly intelligent, problem solvers
- Different beliefs cause separation within the community
- Indigenous to the grassy and more lush areas of Berona
