= Hepcats =

American comic by Martin Wagner

- Original cover of Issue #1.

Publication information
- Publisher: Double Diamond Press
- Schedule: Irregular
- Format: Standard black-and-white
- Genre: Furry
- Publication date: May 26 1989 – September 1994
- No. of issues: 12

Creative team
- Created by: Martin Wagner

Collected editions
- The Collegiate Hepcats: ISBN 978-0963666017
- Snowblind, Part One: ISBN 9780963666024

Hepcats is a comic book series self-published in the 1990s by cartoonist Martin Wagner. It deals with the lives of four college students, rendered as anthropomorphic animals (humanoid bodies, but animal heads), and is inspired by Wagner's own college experiences.

== Publication history ==
The series began as a comic strip in The Daily Texan, the student newspaper of the University of Texas at Austin, in 1987. Each installment was typically four panels (but with frequent variation), usually with a comedic gag at the end, but with ongoing storylines.

In 1989, inspired by cartoonists such as Dave Sim who were successfully self-publishing their comics, Wagner began publishing Hepcats as a black-and-white comic book series, under his own Double Diamond Press imprint. In this format, the series took on the highly detailed pen-and-ink artwork that would become one of its distinguishing features. Wagner immediately began experimenting with page layouts, including turning the pages sideways, using a double-page spread for each layout for Issue #2. Issue #3 began what was intended to be an 18-part graphic novel entitled Snowblind. Critics have frequently cited Sim's Cerebus the Aardvark as an artistic influence on this material.

Though critically acclaimed, with a cult following, the series was not a financial success, and this led to an erratic publishing schedule that frustrated readers. In comments written later, in the summer of 1996, Wagner cited poor sales, his weak business skills, and his 1991 divorce as the causes of a financial "hole" he was struggling to get out of. Despite Wagner's increasing prominence as one of several acclaimed self-publishers of the period - along with Jeff Smith (Bone), Colleen Doran (A Distant Soil), James A. Owen (Starchild), and Sim (Cerebus) - the series stalled after Issue #12 in 1994. Collections of the Daily Texan strips and of the first volume of Snowblind were released, but Wagner said those sales were not enough to make continuation of the series financially viable.

In 1996 Wagner signed a deal with Antarctic Press to republish the series to date, along with new issues. Antarctic republished the original 12 issues from 1996 to 1998; a color "#0" issue was released to launch this reprint series, but it was the last new material published. Wagner claimed to have finished Issue #13, but in a 1999 interview in Beau Yarbrough's "Comics Wire" at Comic Book Resources, he stated that the "pitiful" advance orders for that issue had led him to look for another way to make a living. Shortly after the cancellation of these orders, however, Antarctic employee Matthew High stated that these orders were in line with the publisher's expectations and that Wagner had never turned in any art for #13. Wagner left the comics industry in 1998.

In 2006, Wagner announced that he would be finishing the Snowblind storyline as a webcomic. By the end of 2010 he admitted to regretting that announcement, as he was busy with paying work and the series was not high on his leisure-time priorities list. In 2008, to tide fans over while waiting for Snowblind to appear, he began work on an 8-page mini-comic unrelated to the Snowblind storyline. The minicomic was also not completed, updates ceasing after page 5, also because of work commitments.

== Collected volumes ==
- Yo: The First Hepcats Book (1988; collection of Daily Texan strips—cover spoofs sleeve of Peter Gabriel's album So)
- The Collegiate Hepcats (1993; complete collection of all Daily Texan strips, plus Hepcats #1 and some pre-Hepcats work from the University of Houston paper)
- Snowblind, Part One (1995; collecting Hepcats #3–10, first half of unfinished Snowblind graphic novel)

Not reprinted in any of these collections are #2 (the sideways issue, reprinted in a "Special Edition" in 1994), and Issues #11 (a 42-page story with a black on dark-gray cover, a dramatic turning point in the story) and #12 (the final issue to see print).
