= Rodney Caston =

American writer and politician

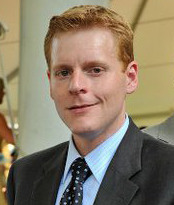
- Caston in 2011
- Born: May 13, 1977 (age 49); Baton Rouge, Louisiana, U.S.
- Occupations: Cybersecurity, writer

Rodney Caston (born May 13, 1977) is an American writer and politician. He is credited as the co-creator of the popular comic book series MegaTokyo.

== Writing ==
Caston is credited as a co-creator and writer of the first volume of the popular comic book series Megatokyo, and as a co-creator of the second volume. He has since parted ways with partner Fred Gallagher and relinquished his interest in Megatokyo. In July 2004, Megatokyo was the tenth best-selling manga property in the U.S.

=== Published works ===
- Megatokyo Volume 1: Chapter Zero (Megatokyo vol.1 1st ed.) ISBN 1-929090-30-7
- Megatokyo Volume 1, 2nd ed. ISBN 1-59307-163-9 (2004)
- Megatokyo Volume 2 ISBN 1-59307-118-3 (2004)
- The Government Hacker Threat Landscape

== Politics ==
Caston is a former member of the Libertarian Party. In 2008, he ran, unsuccessfully, for constable in the state of Texas against Republican Chuck Presley, Sr. He received 19,079 votes (19% of the total votes cast) to Presley's 79,039 votes (81% of the total cast). In 2012, he ran, again unsuccessfully, for Texas State Representative of District 106 for the Libertarian Party against Pat Fallon; he received 8,412 votes (17% of the total votes cast) to Fallon's 41,582 (83% of the total cast)
