= Tim Fish =

American comic book artist and writer

- Born: 1970 (age 55–56) New Hampshire
- Areas: Writer, penciler, inker
- Notable works: Cavalcade of Boys; Liebestrasse; Saved by the Bell: Freshman Year; Please Say It!

Tim Fish (a pen name; born 1970) is a comic book author and artist and playwright, known for the comics Cavalcade of Boys and its spin-off graphic novels, short stories for various anthologies and the original graphic novel Liebestrasse, which was nominated for a GLAAD Media Award for Outstanding Comic Book.

== Early life ==
Fish was born in 1970 and attended the University of New Hampshire. While at school, he created a weekly comic strip in the student newspaper, The New Hampshire. Tim began drawing strip comics at a young age, eventually evolving to mini comics and graphic novels.

== Career ==
Fish is known for his slice-of-life/romance print comic, Cavalcade of Boys, which has been released in trade paperback format, as well is its spin-off graphic novels. He was hired by the New England LGBT newspaper Bay Windows to continue his series Cavalcade of Boys as an ongoing serialized comic, as well as the Brazilian magazine DOM from 2007 to 2008.

He has contributed to several anthologies and adapted an excerpt of Emily Brontë's novel Wuthering Heights for Seven Stories Press. For Lionforge, he was an artist on an officially licensed comic series based on the NBC TV series Saved by the Bell from 2014 to 2015. In 2022, Dark Horse published Liebestrasse, the graphic novel he co-created with Greg Lockard which was named by the American Library Association on their official list of graphic novels for adults in 2022 and noted by the New York Times as one of ten books to celebrate Pride. He posted his young adult webcomic Please Say It! to Webtoon and Tapas from 2022 to 2024.

After completing his MALS degree at Dartmouth College, Fish was awarded a Fulbright research grant in affiliation with Trinity College Dublin. He is currently a PhD candidate in creative writing at the University of Limerick.

== Personal life ==
Fish, who is openly gay, has lived in New Hampshire, St. Louis, San Diego, Boston, and Dublin.

== Works ==
=== Books ===
- Baby Makes Three, Poison Press/Comixology, 2021,
- Boys in Love, H&O Éditions, 2006, ISBN 978-2-84547-141-2
- Cavalcade of Boys, Poison Press, 2006 ISBN 978-0-9762786-6-5
- Liebestrasse, Comixology Originals and Dark Horse, 2019, 2022 ISBN 978-1-5067-2455-3
- Love Is the Reason, Poison Press, 2008 ISBN 978-0-9762786-8-9
- Something Fishy This Way Comes, Poison Press, 2006 ISBN 978-0-9762786-5-8
- Strugglers, Poison Press, 2006 ISBN 978-0-9762786-3-4
- Trust/Truth, Poison Press, 2009 ISBN 978-0-9762786-9-6
- Saved by the Bell: Freshman Year, Roar Comics/Lion Forge, 2015 ISBN 978-1-63140-312-5

=== Webcomics ===
- Please Say It! (2022–2024)
- Imperfect Utopias (2024)

=== Anthologies ===
- On the Romance Road, Poison Press/Comixology, 2021
- Young Bottoms in Love, Poison Press, 2007 ISBN 978-0-9762786-7-2

=== Contributions ===
- The Book of Boy Trouble 2: Born to Trouble, edited by Robert Kirby and David Kelly, Green Candy Press, 2008 ISBN 978-1-931160-65-0
- Boy Trouble, edited by Robert Kirby and David Kelly, Boy Trouble Press, 2004 ISBN 0-9748855-0-9
- Happy Boys and Girls, Coniglio Editore, 2006 ISBN 88-6063-008-8
- I Heart Marvel, Marvel Comics, 2006
- Inbound #4, edited by Dave Kender, Dan Mazur, and Shelli Paroline, Boston Comics Roundtable, 2009 ASIN B00377AK58
- Nation X, Marvel Comics, 2010 ISBN 978-0-7851-3873-0
- Iron Man: Titanium, Marvel Comics, 2010
- Hopeless Savages Greatest Hits, volume 1, Oni Press, 2010 ISBN 978-1-934964-48-4
- The Graphic Canon, volume 2, Seven Stories Press, 2012 ISBN 978-1-60980-378-0
- No Straight Lines, Fantagraphics, 2013 ISBN 978-1-60699-718-5
- Strange Sport Stories, Vertigo, 2015 ISBN 978-1-4012-5864-1
- Where We Live: Las Vegas Shooting Benefit Anthology, Image Comics, 2018 ISBN 978-1-5343-0822-0
