= Omar Valdivieso =

American YouTube host and comics commentator (born 1978)

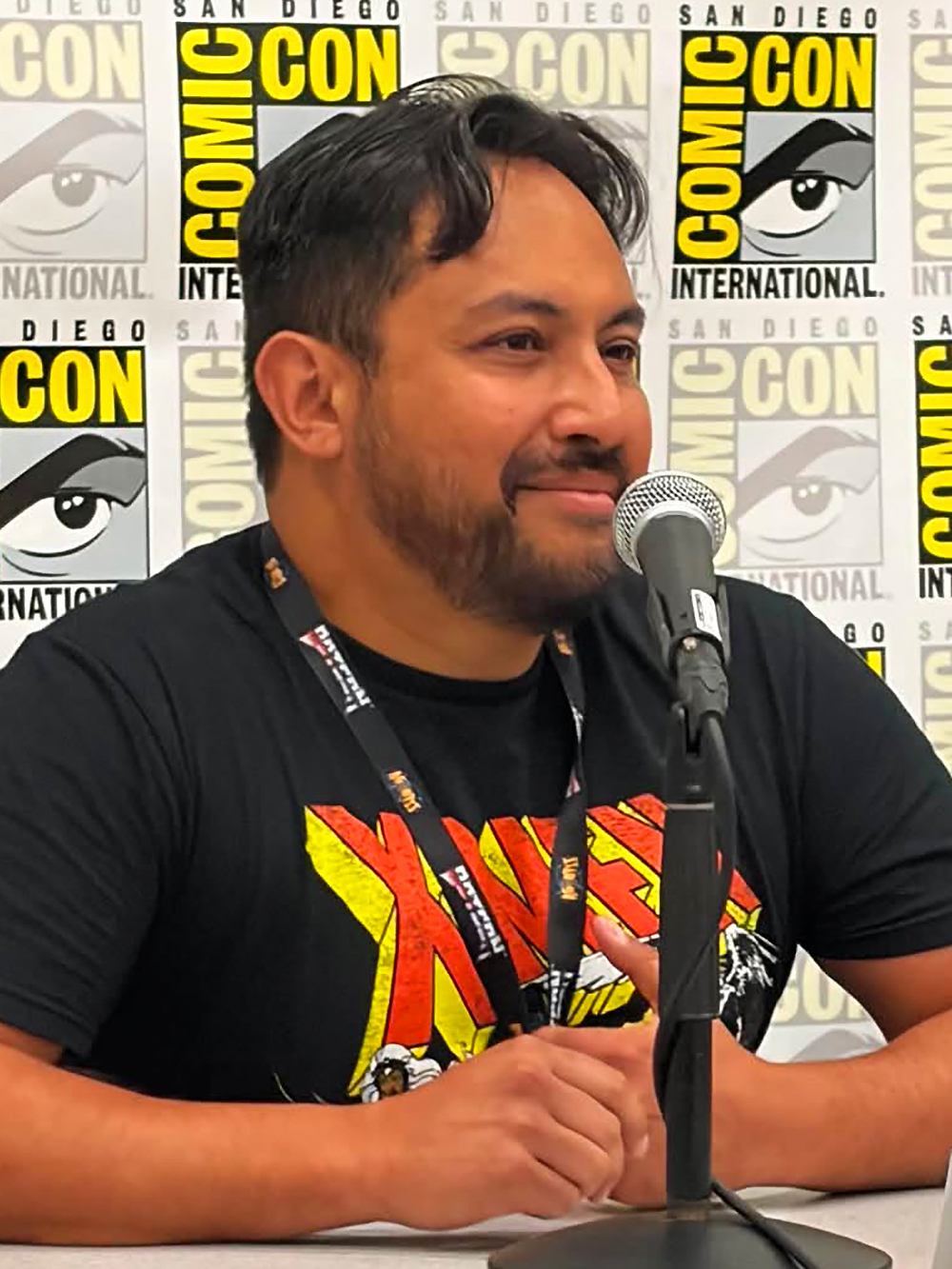
- Valdivieso at San Diego Comic Con in 2026
- Born: Lima, Peru
- Other name: The Uncanny Omar
- Occupations: YouTuber; author

Instagram information
- Page: nearmintcon
- Followers: 19,100

TikTok information
- Page: nearmintcondition
- Followers: 42,900

YouTube information
- Channel: Near Mint Condition
- Years active: 2016–present
- Genre: Comic Books / Graphic Novels
- Subscribers: 133,000
- Views: 55 million
- Last updated: July 17, 2026

Omar Valdivieso, also known online as The Uncanny Omar, is an American YouTube creator, comics reviewer, and commentator. He is the creator and host of the YouTube channel Near Mint Condition. Through the channel, he reviews collected editions of comic books and conducts interviews with comic book creators and publishers.

The channel focuses on collected editions published by companies including Marvel Comics, DC Comics, Image Comics, and Dark Horse Comics. Its programming includes reviews, release announcements, reading guides, creator interviews, and weekly livestream discussions with viewers.

His videos emphasize collected editions rather than comic book speculation or investment, and frequently provide reading recommendations for new readers.

Valdivieso also serves as an advisor to comics publishers regarding selection and production of collected editions.

== Early life ==
Born in Lima, Peru, Valdivieso discovered comic books in 1984 at age 5 while recovering from appendix surgery in a children's hospital. His uncle, who lived in the United States, sent him care packages of English-language superhero comics, including Uncanny X-Men #168. Valdivieso then began seeking out translated editions of American comics in Peru and collecting back issues.

In 1987, Valdivieso moved to the United States with his family and began to read monthly comic books as he developed his English skills. Valdivieso worked at a comic book store from 1993 to 1996.

After a six-year gap of not reading comics from 1996 to 2002, Valdivieso began seeking out collected editions to read the material he missed in single-issue format. By 2004, Valdivieso began reading comics exclusively in collected edition format.

Valdivieso wrote for various websites from 2003 to 2006, including Komikwerks and Beckett Anime magazine, in which he reviewed anime and manga titles in a monthly column titled "Fantastic Plastic". During that same period, Valdivieso co-hosted a comics podcast called "About Heroes", offering reviews of comics, anime, and manga, which later transitioned into a standalone website.

== Career ==
Omar Valdivieso on the panel "The Mount Rushmore of Comics Everyone Should Read" at Lexington Comic & Toy Convention 2026

Valdivieso launched the Near Mint Condition YouTube Channel in 2016 as a group discussion show in which he and several friends would discuss video games, anime, toys, and comics. He began filming videos featuring reviews of omnibus editions from his personal collection and reading order breakdowns for various Marvel and DC collected editions.

In 2018, Valdivieso made a video at his daughter's suggestion during a comic book store visit on Free Comic Book Day. The video was shared around the Marvel offices and David Gabriel, the Senior Vice President of Marketing and Publishing, reached out to Valdivieso to begin sponsoring announcement videos on Near Mint Condition. In 2020, at 42 years old, Valdivieso became a full-time content creator after being laid off from working as a project manager in IT, due to the effects of the COVID-19 pandemic.

The growth of his YouTube channel led to direct relationships with comic book publishers, particularly Marvel Comics, which sponsors regular "Breaking News" segments featuring announcements of upcoming omnibus editions.

In February 2026, Valdivieso was selected to speak on a panel at ComicsPro about the role of online creators in connecting publishers with readers. The same month, Valdivieso was announced as a contributor to the comics journalism fanzine Comics Staple. In July 2026, Valdivieso was invited to speak at San Diego Comic Con on the industry panel "Reels to Register: Is Short-Form Video the New Comics Journalism?". In September 2026, Valdivieso spoke at Lexington Comic & Toy Convention on the panel "The Mount Rushmore of Comics Everyone Should Read", discussing the top comic book series for readers.

== Publisher relationships and projects ==
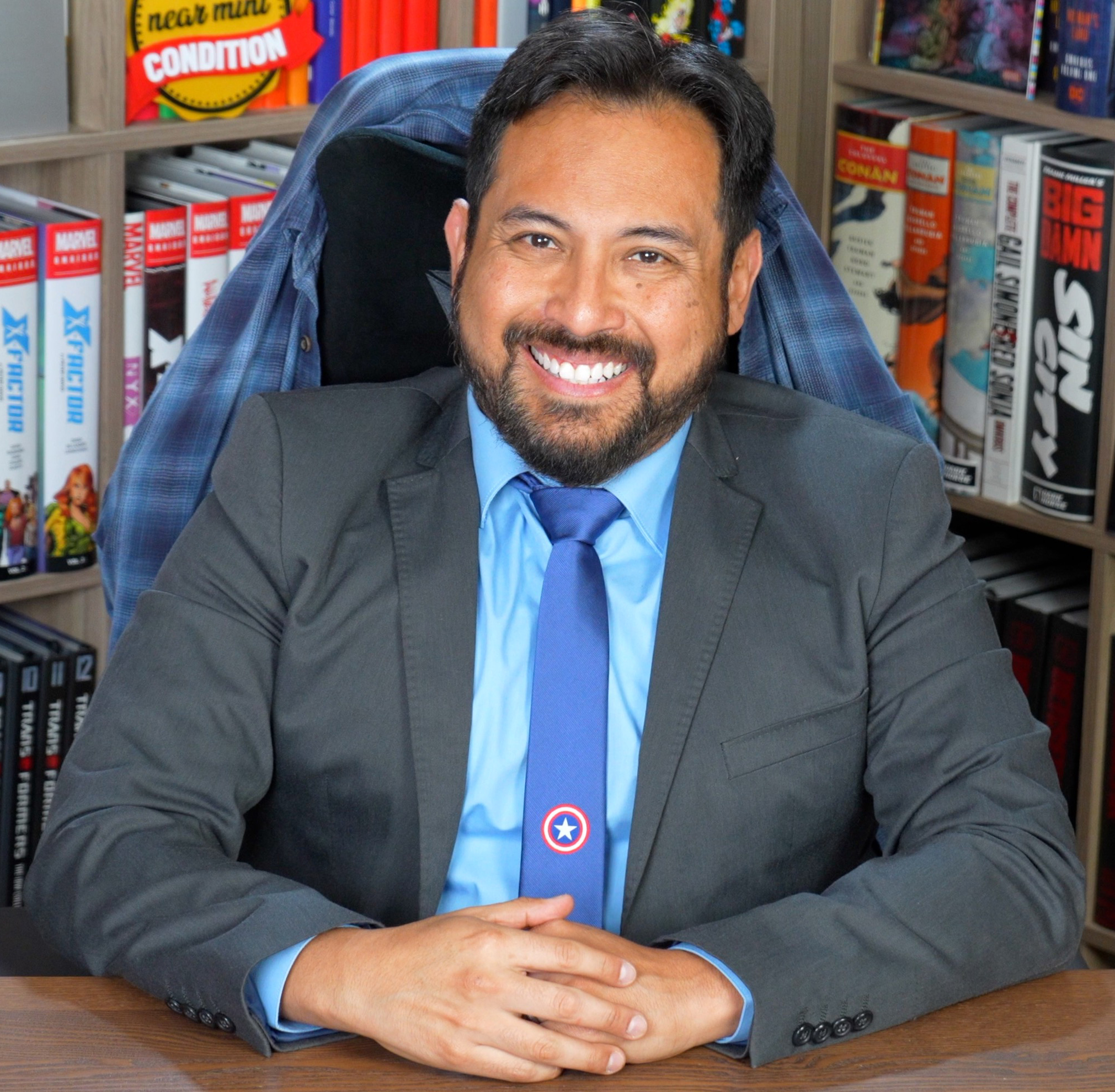
Valdivieso has hosted the Near Mint Condition YouTube channel since 2016, providing comic interviews, reviews, and commentary on collected editions.

According to David Harper of SKTCHD, Valdivieso's efforts to increase engagement between readers and publishers have contributed to the increased availability of first-time collected editions and reprints.

When Valdivieso previewed the digitally recolored cover of the Sensational She-Hulk by John Byrne omnibus, fans reacted negatively, and Byrne subsequently contacted Marvel to restore the original coloring.

In 2026, The Beat described him as "a trusted expert" on graphic novels and collected editions and noted that his channel had surpassed 127,000 YouTube subscribers. Valdivieso creates annual Reader Polls to inform Marvel and DC of the "most wanted" collected editions and reprints as voted by his viewers. Valdivieso also advises publishers on production-related concerns such as mapping, box size, and covers.

Valdivieso has appeared as a guest on several comics-related podcasts discussing collected editions and the growth of his channel. In 2024, Near Mint Condition co-produced an exclusive hardcover edition of Extremity by Daniel Warren Johnson and Mike Spicer, and in 2026, co-produced an exclusive hardcover of Stray Dogs by Tony Fleecs and Trish Forstner.

His Near Mint Condition channel achieved YouTube's Silver Play Button award for reaching over 100,000 subscribers. Valdivieso and Near Mint Condition won the Comic Book Community Award for Best Omnibus Overview in 2024, and received the Comic Book Community Hall of Fame Award in 2025.

== Personal life ==
Valdivieso lives in Kentucky with his wife Melanie, who often co-hosts on Near Mint Condition under the name "The Astonishing Melanie".
