= The Accelerators (comics) =

American comic book created by writer Ronnie Porto

- Cover to Accelerators #1, art by Walt Flanagan

Publication information
- Publisher: Blue Juice Comics
- Schedule: Irregular
- Format: Ongoing series
- Genre: Science fiction
- Publication date: May 2013
- No. of issues: 20
- Main character(s): Spatz, Alexa, Bertram

Creative team
- Created by: RFI Porto
- Written by: RFI Porto
- Artist: Gavin Smith
- Letterer: Crank!
- Colorist: Tim Yates

Collected editions
- Time Games: ISBN 1940967511
- Momentum: ISBN 194096752X
- Relativity: ISBN 1940967538

The Accelerators is an American comic book created by writer Ronnie Porto, who originally conceived it as a screenplay. It is illustrated by Gavin Smith, colored by Tim Yates, and published by Blue Juice Comics. Planned to be a six-issue limited series released in 2013, it was followed by three additional storylines. Accelerators was promoted through podcasts and social media. Twenty issues have been released on an irregular schedule, and the first fifteen have been collected into four square bound volumes. Porto expects the story to be complete after the fifth volume. The series has received mostly positive reviews from critics for its handling of time travel and its characters.

The story is about a teenager named Spatz who is accidentally taken to the future. As the story progresses, he encounters future versions of himself at various ages and states of sanity.

== Publication history ==
=== Development ===
Ronnie Porto (Note: Porto is credited as "RFI Porto" in the published material.) originally conceived The Accelerators as a screenplay, as he had previously had success with other film scripts, and worked on it periodically for about two years. While working on the set of AMC's Comic Book Men television show in 2012, he met members of Blue Juice Films, Inc who were also involved in the show's production. The show's content convinced Blue Juice Films to start a comic division called Blue Juice Comics. Blue Juice asked Porto to pitch ideas for a comic series, and they liked The Accelerators the best. They fine-tuned the concept for four months, deciding what events should happen in each issue and where chapter breaks would fit best. The series was initially planned as a five-issue limited series, but Porto was able to persuade editor Tom Mumme to extend the plan to six issues.

Another worker on the set who was aware of the developing book knew Gavin Smith, an aspiring comic book artist, and told Porto about him. Smith had graduated from the Kubert School in 2011, and he agreed to illustrate The Accelerators after a two hour telephone conversation with Porto in July 2012. Because no one was sure how successful the comic might be, Mumme only promised to pay Porto and Smith for two issues, with only one issue guaranteed to be published. The book would be released on a bimonthly schedule to allow extra time to gauge sales. If sales were weak, the rest of the project would be cancelled.

When Smith's artwork arrived, Porto and most of the Blue Juice team thought the quality was high enough to publish it in black and white, which would reduce costs. As an experiment to see if color could help distinguish different time periods in the story, Smith had his friend, colorist Tim Yates, submit a colorized version of one page. His enhancements to Smith's line art, such as scars on a soldier's face and red hair on a character whose clothes often blended into backgrounds, convinced everyone involved that the series needed to be done in full color. Due to the development path of the project, Porto and Blue Juice share ownership of The Accelerators, while Smith and Yates are considered work for hire. The final product was available in stores nearly a year after Porto began working on the script.

=== Production ===
As the creators developed the comic, they gave weekly progress updates on the "I Sell Comics" podcast hosted by Comic Book Men stars Mike Zapcic and Ming Chen and shared various stages of artwork on social media. Through Facebook, Blue Juice Comics ran a poll to see what a fair price for an independent comic would be. At the same time, Blue Juice was working with Diamond Comic Distributors and Comixology to secure a way to get the finished product to readers. This process took longer than expected according to Porto, but he was glad for the delay because it allowed him and Smith to get ahead of schedule.

Before starting each issue, Porto and Smith have a phone conversation to discuss the coming story. Most of the plot comes from Porto, but Smith occasionally suggests ideas that are used in the finished work, such as a main character befriending one of the henchmen. When drafting a script, Porto provides specific details to let Smith know how certain scenes and settings should look. Aside from a costume request from Porto, all character designs are left to Smith. After Smith completes the pencil work, he scans it and applies inks to a full-size copy. He sometimes applies white out to the inks to achieve a smear effect, and will occasionally use digital tools to add zipatone patterns or to make an adjustment. The line work is sent to Yates for coloring with only a few notes, since they established comfortable baselines on the first issue.

To draw more attention to the series, Walt Flanagan provided pencils for the first five covers, with Smith inking. Niko Walter also provided art for a variant cover of the first issue. Beginning with issue six, Smith has penciled and inked the cover art.

=== Publication ===
On October 17, 2012, the Blue Juice Comics blog released a free PDF containing two covers and the first seven pages of the first issue. Beginning in May 2013, a new issue of Accelerators was released to comic specialty shops every two months. Following issue six, the comic series went on hiatus. A paperback collection of the first six issues was released in July 2014 with the subtitle "Time Games". At that time, sales had been good enough for Blue Juice Comics to approve an additional four issues.

The next issue was released May 2015 as Accelerators: Momentum #1. It was labeled as a four-issue limited series and released on a monthly schedule. It was followed by a second paperback collection in December 2015. After another hiatus, the series returned with five more monthly issues in May 2016. These issues carried the subtitle "Relativity" and were numbered eleven through fifteen. They were collected into a third paperback volume that was released in December 2016. After yet another hiatus, the series returned with five more monthly issues (skipping August) in May 2020. These issues carried the subtitle "Backwards and Forwards" and were numbered sixteen through twenty. A fourth collected edition is scheduled for release in 2021.

In a 2015 interview, Porto said his ideas for the series would last for a total five volumes.

== Plot ==
=== Time Games ===
In 1960, Alexa is part of a team of physicists studying a mysterious piece of torus-shaped technology. Her husband, Bertram, is a member of the US Army and is part of the guard surrounding the project. One day the torus repeatedly and uncontrollably transports Alexa and Bertram into the future, with each jump skipping a longer duration of time. As they pass through the 1990s, they are joined by a teenager named Spatz. The trio arrives in the dystopic year 2046 where the torus technology is commonplace. They are captured and forced into gladiatorial combat with other participants pulled from the past. The leader of the games is a woman named Bob, and she removes Spatz from the games when she recognizes him. She explains that when he is older, Spatz will be able to travel back in time and that he was instrumental in the development of her society. With the aid of one of Bob's cyborg henchmen, Spatz rescues Alexa, Bertram, and a Centurion before sabotaging the torus powering the coliseum to end the gladiator games. As the whole building is transported to a future time, the group is confronted by an elderly version of Spatz. He explains that they must continue their journey forward, and that they must take Bob with them because she will be important.

=== Momentum ===
After a few stops in increasingly unpleasant time periods, Alexa, Bertram, Spatz, the henchman, the Centurion, and Bob stop in a peaceful pre-industrial society. Spatz discovers it is ruled by an artificial intelligence that believes humanity is more secure without advanced technology. It dismantles the torus so the group cannot leave. It has also been imprisoning criminals who have travelled from the past in suspended animation. It claims Spatz is responsible for many crimes that occurred in the past, but is confused because it already has him incarcerated. Spatz reveals the AI's existence to the rest of the group, activating a program hidden in the henchman's cyborg attachments which causes the AI to malfunction and shut down. The criminals escape, including an elderly version of Spatz. Without using a torus, the elderly Spatz warps the teen Spatz and his group further into the future.

=== Relativity ===
The group appears in the coliseum from the Time Games during an ice age in the 88th century, where they meet a middle-aged Spatz. The elderly Spatz explains that the teen Spatz will develop a brain tumor that causes insanity. The middle-aged "Lost" Spatz is in the midst of the insanity and devotes himself to traveling through time trying to prove the future can be changed. At some future point, the tumor will be surgically removed. The elderly Spatz, now sane, tries to undo the Lost Spatz's actions. Lost Spatz tries to persuade the teen Spatz to join him, but the teen declines. Lost Spatz then reveals that due to his meddling, Bob is actually Alexa and Bertram's daughter. Her cyborg henchmen are all created by mixing Spatz's DNA with other people. In an effort to force the elderly Spatz to take action, Lost Spatz fatally shoots Bob. An older version of Eve appears and knocks out Lost Spatz. As Bob dies, the time travels abilities of teen Spatz activate, but unable to control it, he travels to "the end of time" and discovers a meeting of countless copies of himself.

=== Backwards and Forwards ===
Framed as a story an ancient Spatz relates to his childhood self, teen Spatz meets his various future selves and discovers that only he can travel backwards in time. He departs for the past with a middle-aged "almost lost" Spatz. In the framing story, the Lost Spatz appears to kill his childhood self, only to be restrained by multiple versions of himself. The ancient Spatz continues the story about the group in the 88th century, where elderly Spatz takes control of the cyborgs, who fly the coliseum into the air and towards "the way home." On the way, they encounter three immense wormlike remnants of humanity who have mutated and bonded with Accelerator technology. Spartacus sacrifices himself to destroy one, and the others two are destroyed by a skull-headed cyborg Eve knows as "The Face", who stands in front of a gigantic spire that stretches into the sky, along with a teen Spatz in grunge attire. Face explains that the Spire grew from the Seedling, which grew from one of the original 1960s toruses, and that it acts as a door to a refuge from time travel. Elderly Spatz and Alexa operate on the brain (revealed to be technological rather than human) of Lost Spatz, while Bertram digs graves and Eve fights young worms along with Face. The grunge teen Spatz tells the story of time travelling with the almost lost Spatz, continually hunted by the Lost Spatz and continually saved by his various future incarnations. They eventually return to a later version of pre-industrial town, now run by Eve, but the Lost Spatz appears and sabotages the Seedling, annihilating the town and prompting the almost lost Spatz to depart and become the Lost Spatz. An older Spatz gives Eve a torus, who jumps to the 88th century to stop the Lost Spatz. The now sane Lost Spatz awakens from the surgery and joins the group in front of the now activated Spire, where Face, slacker teen Spatz, the former Lost Spatz, and the elderly Spatz explain that "home" is the 999th century, where Spatz are not permitted. Alexa and Bertram enter the Spire, while Eve and Face remain to guard it along with the former Lost Spatz. The grunge teen Spatz travels back to hear the end of the framing story, briefly considers killing their now sleeping childhood self, and witnesses the death of the ancient Spatz from old age. He and multiple other versions carry the body back to the gathering at the end of time.

== Reception ==
The first issue debuted to mostly positive reviews, earning an average score of 8.2 out of 10 according to the review aggregator Comic Book Roundup. The series overall averages 8.7 out of 10. Several reviewers praised the way time travel was represented, particularly that travelers could only move forward in time. In a review for Multiversity Comics, Drew Bradley said Porto had "adapted himself [from screenplays] to the 22-page serial format very well." Both Bradley and Capeless Crusader's Thom Obarski felt the characters were engaging. Smith's pencils and Yates' colors were also praised by reviewers. While Florida Geek Scene reviewer Dustin Infinger agreed the comic was well made, he felt "that nothing about [it] is very unique."
