= James A. Owen =

American novelist

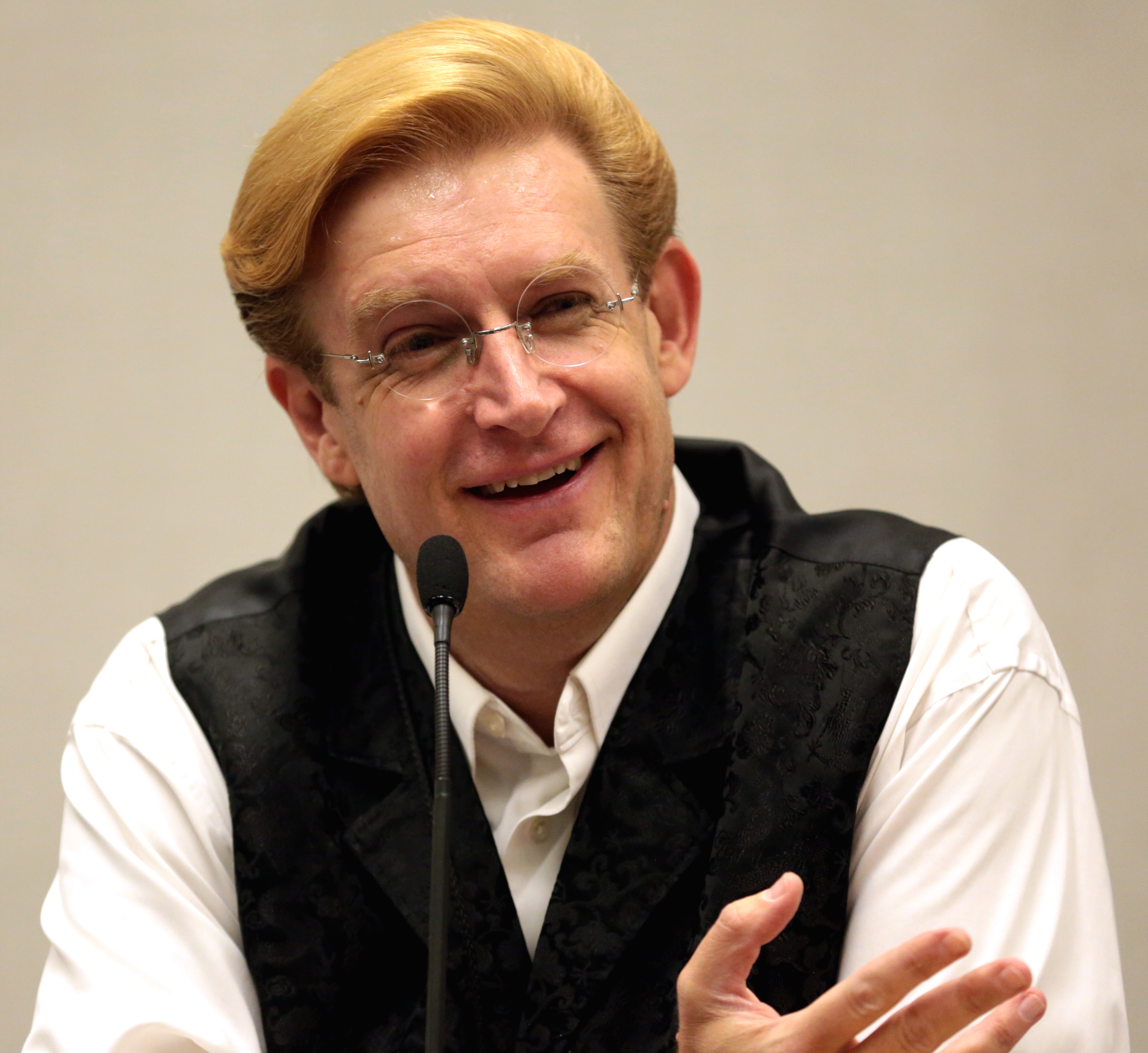
- Owen at Phoenix Comicon, 2017
- Born: November 11, 1969 (age 57)
- Areas: Writer, Artist, Publisher, Letterer
- Notable works: Starchild; Here, There Be Dragons

James A. Owen (born November 11, 1969) is an American comic book illustrator, publisher and writer. He is known for his creator-owned comic book series Starchild and as the author of The Chronicles of the Imaginarium Geographica novel series, that began with Here, There Be Dragons in 2006.

== Career ==
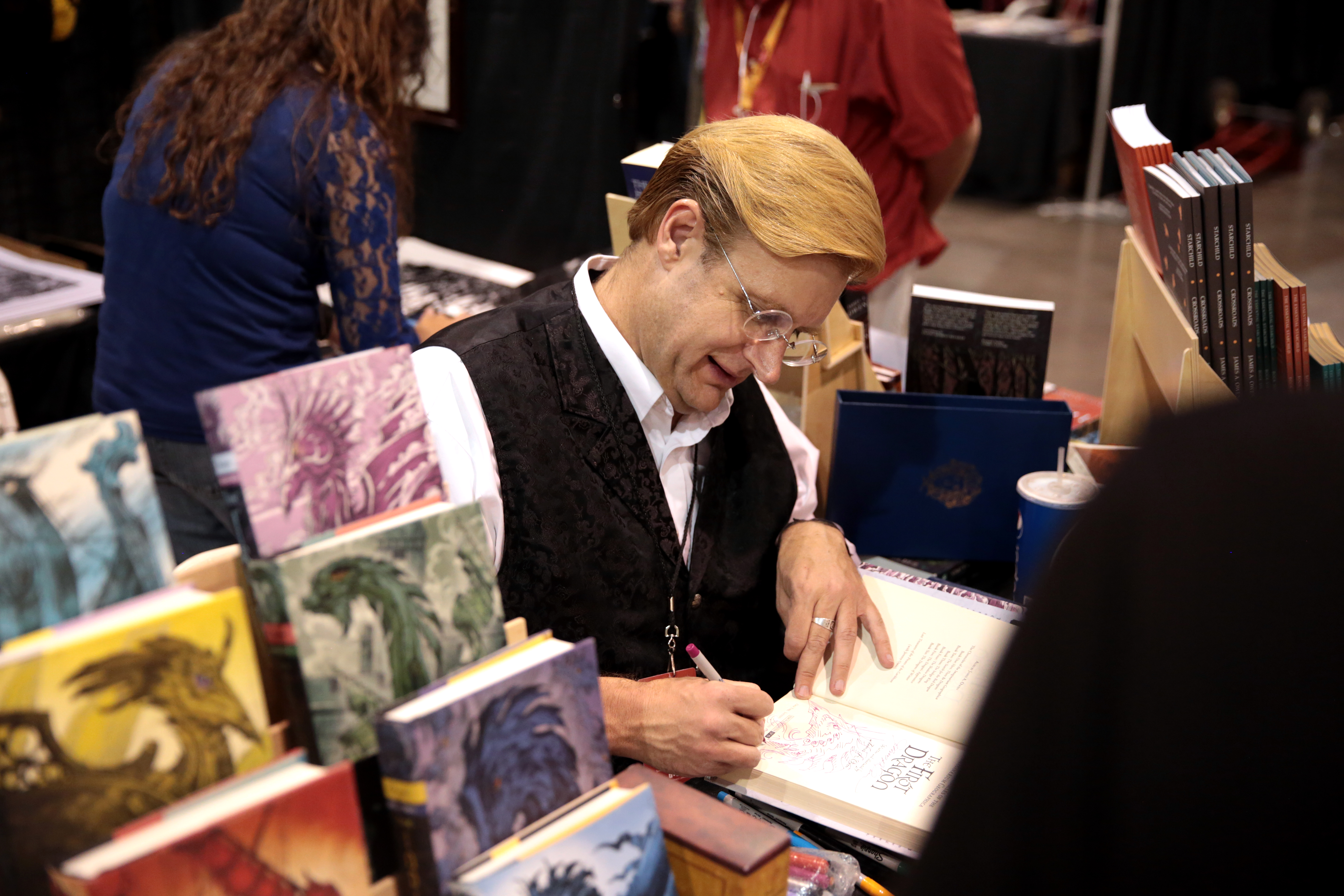
Owen signing books at the 2017 Phoenix Comicon

Owen self-published the black-and-white fantasy series Starchild under his Taliesin Press imprint in the 1990s. Adopting the name Coppervale Press for Starchild: Crossroads, he gave up self publishing in 1997 for Starchild: Mythopolis, five issues of which were published by Image Comics. Owen returned to self publishing, compiling a volume of Starchild reprints via a Kickstarter campaign in 2015.

Later, Owen reinvented himself as a novelist, creating a fantasy series titled Mythworld for a German publishing company. The books were later reprinted in the United States by Baen.

In 2003, Coppervale Press relaunched two newsstand style magazines, the fine arts-oriented International Studio and the fiction periodical Argosy, but both magazines ceased publication in 2004 after only a few issues. In 2009, a satirical short story by Jeff VanderMeer entitled "Errata" about Argosy and its demise was published by Tor Books.

In 2006 his novel Here, There Be Dragons was published, the first book in The Chronicles of the Imaginarium Geographica series. The book had multiple printings, and was published around the world in more than twenty languages. It was followed by The Search for the Red Dragon and The Indigo King in 2008, The Shadow Dragons in 2009, The Dragon's Apprentice 2010, The Dragons of Winter in 2012, and "The First Dragon" in 2013.

After releasing a non-fiction ebook of personal stories, Drawing Out The Dragons, Coppervale Press, in early 2011, Owen had a successful Kickstarter project raising funds to create a limited first edition paperback and hard cover, as well as an audio version of the ebook.

Owen announced The Meditations trilogy was picked up by Shadow Mountain Publishing but as of 2021, his work was out of print at the company.

== Works ==
- Pryderi Terra, vol. Book One: Awakening, 1986.

=== Starchild ===
- 0. Gatherum, 1993.
- 1. Prologue: Markings and The Mad-Eyed Sorcerer, 1992.
- 2. Children of the Storm, 1992.
- 3. That Hideous Strength, 1993.
- 4. The Wild Hunt, 1993.
- 5. Toccata and Fugue, 1994.
- 6. Autumn People, 1994.
- 7. The Old Mill, 1994.
- 8. A Fine Madness, 1994.
- 9. Fool's Game, 1994.
- 10. Spirits in a Material World, 1994.
- 11. Tempest in a Looking Glass, 1994.
- 12. Awakening, 1994.
- Awakenings, 1995 (retelling of the previous Starchild books).

=== Starchild: Crossroads ===
1. The Weaver's Tale, 1995.
2. The Innkeeper's Tale, 1996.
3. The Wanderer's Tale, 1996.
4. The Bard's Tale, 1997.

=== Starchild: Mythopolis ===
- 0. Prologue, 1997.
- 1. Pinehead, vol. Part 1, 1997
- 2. Pinehead, vol. Part 2, 1997.
- 3. Pinehead, vol. Part 3, 1998.
- 4. Fisher King, vol. Part 1, 1998.

=== Starchild: Mythopolis II ===
- Volume One, 2007.
- Volume Two, 2008, "planned".

=== Kai Meyers Mythenwelt (DE) ===
1. Die ewige Bibliothek, 2002.
2. Der unsichtbare Mond, 2003.
3. Der zeitlose Winter, 2004.
4. Die verschollene Symphonie, 2004.

=== The Chronicles of the Imaginarium Geographica ===
1. Here, There Be Dragons, September 2006.
2. The Search for the Red Dragon, January 2008.
3. The Indigo King, October 2008.
4. The Shadow Dragons, October 2009.
5. The Dragon's Apprentice, October 2010.
6. The Dragons of Winter, August 2012.
7. The First Dragon, November 2013.
8. The Dragon Knight, November 2020.

=== The Meditations ===
1. Drawing Out The Dragons, Shadow Mountain, February 2013 [2011, Coppervale].
2. The Barbizon Diaries, Summer 2013.
3. The Grand Design, Fall 2013.

=== Fool's Hollow ===
1. Volume 1, October 2013.
