= A-Kon =

Four-day anime convention held annually in Dallas

Coordinates: 32.8779653°N 96.9431448°W

- Logo
- Status: Active
- Venue: Irving Convention Center at Las Colinas; Toyota Music Factory
- Location: Irving, Texas
- Country: United States
- Inaugurated: 1990
- Attendance: 34,684 in 2018
- Organizer: Frank Powell
- Website: www.a-kon.com

A-Kon is an annual three-day anime convention held during June at the Irving Convention Center at Las Colinas and Toyota Music Factory in Irving, Texas. First held in 1990 with just 380 people in attendance, A-Kon is North America's longest running convention primarily focused on anime.

== Departments ==
A-Kon consists of many volunteer managed teams each dedicated to operating a portion of this large convention. Each year, usually in February or March, they post a web page for volunteer sign-up. Volunteers work at least sixteen hours during the weekend and receive a free pass to the convention. Working for 20 hours, volunteers aged over 18 can receive a hotel room, shared with 3 other staff members.

== Programming ==
While the focus of the convention was originally centered on anime fandom and screenings of films and television series, many other activities take place encompassing various segments of geek and Japanese pop culture. These events include panels with American authors and artists, a console gaming room, tabletop gaming room, cosplay, scavenger hunts, martial arts demonstrations, an art show, and concerts by Japanese and SteamPunk bands. The convention also maintains a vigorous social network presence on Facebook and Twitter, having about 15,000 and 7,000 followers respectively, through which they post information and run contests throughout the year.

== History ==
The name seems to be a play on the early anime series Project A-ko. A-Kon was purchased by Frank Powell in January 2019, during a period when the convention was having money issues. The convention moved from Fort Worth to Fair Park in Dallas during this ownership change and changed dates to later in June. A-Kon 2020 was cancelled due to the COVID-19 pandemic. A-Kon 2021 was also cancelled due to the COVID-19 pandemic. A-Kon 2024 was postponed due to various issues including financial problems. The convention, in a May 2025 update announced that 2024 refunds were starting to be issued, and they hope to hold an event in 2026 or 2027.

=== Event history ===
Dates	Location	Atten.	Guests
July 28–29, 1990	Richardson Hilton; Richardson, Texas	380	
May 25–26, 1991	Radisson Hotel & Suites; Dallas, Texas	497	Jerry Beck, DNA Productions, Ben Dunn, Tim Eldred, Trish Ledoux, Tomoko Saito, Toren Smith, Jason Waltrip, John Waltrip, and Adam Warren.
June 5–7, 1992	Holiday Inn Brookhollow; Dallas, Texas	650	
May 28–30, 1993	Holiday Inn Brookhollow; Dallas, Texas	850	
June 3–5, 1994	Sheraton-Mockingbird Hotel; Dallas, Texas	1,111	Robert DeJesus, DNA Productions, Ben Dunn, Neil Nadelman, Lisa "Honey-chan" Nelson, Fred Perry, Monkey Punch, Tomoko Saito, Sue Shambaugh, Toren Smith, and Adam Warren.
June 2, 1995	Harvey Addison Hotel; Addison, Texas	1,450	Kevin Altieri, Ippongi Bang, Glen Murakami, and Yorihisa Uchida.
May 31 – June 2, 1996	Harvey Addison Hotel; Addison, Texas	800	Ben Dunn, Neil Nadelman, Jan Scott-Frazier, Rikki Simons, and Tavisha Wolfgarth-Simons.
May 30 – June 1, 1997	Harvey Hotel-Addison; Addison, Texas	1,243	Tiffany Grant and Jan Scott-Frazier.
May 29–31, 1998	Harvey Hotel D/FW; Dallas, Texas	1,931	Will Allison, Ippongi Bang, Steve Bennett, Pat Duke, Ben Dunn, Newton Ewell, Tiffany Grant, Amy Howard-Wilson, Mitsuhisa Ishikawa, Kuni Kimura, Neil Nadelman, Jan Scott-Frazier, Doug Smith, Shawn the Touched, Elin Winkler, Robert Woodhead, and Toshifumi Yoshida.
June 4–6, 1999	Hyatt Regency DFW; Dallas, Texas	3,000	Will Allison, Hiroshi Aro, Steve Bennett, Jessica Calvello, Rodney "Largo" Caston, Robert DeJesus, Pat Duke, Ben Dunn, P.N. Elrod, Newton Ewell, Tiffany Grant, Lea Hernandez, Amy Howard-Wilson, Mari Iijima, Kuni Kimura, Trish Ledoux, Edward Luena, Neil Nadelman, Fred Perry, Rikki Simons, Brian Stelfreeze, Shawn the Touched, Valkyrie Games, Adam Warren, Brett Weaver, Joe Wight, Elin Winkler, Tavisha Wolfgarth-Simons, and Toshifumi Yoshida.
June 2–4, 2000	Hyatt Regency DFW; Dallas, Texas	4,500	Arik Renee Avila, Rodney "Largo" Caston, Dementia7 Studios, Tiffany Grant, Amy Howard-Wilson, Lisa Ortiz, and Gilles Poitras.
June 1–3, 2001	Sheraton Park Central Hotel; Dallas, Texas	5,200	Arik Renee Avila, Dementia7 Studios, Crispin Freeman, Tiffany Grant, Amy Howard-Wilson, Tsukasa Kotobuki, and Brett Weaver.
May 31 – June 2, 2002	Hyatt Regency DFW; Dallas, Texas	6,420	Will Allison, Arik Renee Avila, Steve Bennett, Tippi N. Blevins, Rodney "Largo" Caston, Meg Chittenden, Dementia7 Studios, DNA Productions, Duel Jewel, Pat Duke, Ben Dunn, P.N. Elrod, Newton Ewell, Melanie Fletcher, Fred Gallagher, Tiffany Grant, Yaya Han, Matthew High, Taliesin Jaffe, Daniel Kanemitsu, Kobushi Taiko, Steve Kyte, Edward Luena, Lee W. Madison, Lee Martindale, Helen McCarthy, Scott McNeil, Lindze Merritt, Millermuller Ballet, Phillip Nelson, Jonathan Osborne, Panther Comics, Eddie Perkins, Fred Perry, Radio Comix, Xero Reynolds, Joe Rosales, Stan Sakai, Jan Scott-Frazier, Diana X. Sprinkle, Michael Suarez, The Sun String Quartet, Valkyrie Games, Joe Wight, and Elin Winkler.
May 30 – June 1, 2003	Hyatt Regency DFW; Dallas, Texas	7,413	Will Allison, American Dream, Arik Renee Avila, Greg Ayres, John Barrett, Steve Bennett, Bob Bergen, Kei Blue, Samuel Bohon, Camino, Jonathan Clements, Dr. Comet, Robert DeJesus, Dementia7 Studios, Doug Dlin, DNA Productions, Duel Jewel, Lee Duhlig, Pat Duke, Ben Dunn, P.N. Elrod, Rod Espinosa, Rhonda Eudaly, Newton Ewell, Bruce Faulconer, Melanie Fletcher, Iain Gill, Tiffany Grant, James Hanrahan, Kyle Hebert, Matthew High, Amy Howard-Wilson, Ursula Husted, David Hutchison, Charlene Ingram, Daniel Kanemitsu, Kikimo-dan, Steve Kyte, Jaxon Lee, Joshua Lesnick, Bruce Lewis, Edward Luena, Lee W. Madison, Manga Graphix, Lee Martindale, Carol McAlister, Helen McCarthy, Mike McFarland, Scott McNeil, Stephanie Nadolny, Lisa "Honey-chan" Nelson, Phillip Nelson, Jana G. Oliver, Chris Patton, Eddie Perkins, Fred Perry, Walker Plagge, Monica Rial, Sally Ridout, Kai Robertson, Jan Scott-Frazier, Rikki Simons, Diana X. Sprinkle, Brian Stelfreeze, Strong Arm Productions, The Sun String Quartet, Nobuyuki Takahashi, Jonathan Tarbox, Temple Studios, Eric Vale, Valkyrie Games, Michael Vega, J. Shanon Weaver, Jochen Weltjens, Joe Wight, Elin Winkler, Amanda Winn-Lee, and Tavisha Wolfgarth-Simons.
June 4–6, 2004	Adam's Mark Hotel; Dallas, Texas	9,449	Will Allison, Arik Renee Avila, John Barrett, Steve Bennett, Samuel Bohon, Rick Bones, Camino, Michael Coleman, Zach Davis, Dementia7 Studios, Brad DeMoss, Doug Dlin, Do As Infinity (D-A-I), Lee Duhlig, Pat Duke, P.N. Elrod, Rod Espinosa, Newton Ewell, Bruce Faulconer, Steve Fellows, Fred Gallagher, Lauren Goodnight, Tiffany Grant, Alan Gutierrez, James Hanrahan, Kyle Hebert, Matthew High, Tony Hobdy, Amy Howard-Wilson, Ursula Husted, David Hutchison, Samantha Inoue-Harte, Jonathan Klein, Steve Kyte, Mark Lancaster, Bruce Lewis, Lee W. Madison, Manga Graphix, Carol McAlister, Helen McCarthy, Mike McFarland, Scott McNeil, Stephanie Nadolny, Jonathan Osborne, Eddie Perkins, Walker Plagge, Psycho Le Cému, Xero Reynolds, Monica Rial, Sally Ridout, Kai Robertson, S. John Ross, Carrie Savage, Sean Schemmel, Jan Scott-Frazier, JE Smith, Diana X. Sprinkle, Brian Stelfreeze, The Sun String Quartet, Nami Tamaki, Jonathan Tarbox, Valkyrie Games, Michael Vega, J. Shanon Weaver, Jochen Weltjens, Joe Wight, and Elin Winkler.
June 3–5, 2005	Adam's Mark Hotel; Dallas, Texas	10,771	Tom Bateman, Ferret Baudoin, Steve Bennett, DJ Boss, Anthony Brownrigg, Robert DeJesus, Michael Dobson, Robin Atkin Downes, dream, Ben Dunn, P.N. Elrod, Newton Ewell, Melanie Fletcher, Fred Gallagher, Megan Giles, Kyle Hebert, Joel Heyman, Matthew High, Samantha Inoue-Harte, Tramell Isaac, Taliesin Jaffe, Kumiko Kato, Kobushi Taiko, Steve Kyte, Bruce Lewis, Masao Maruyama, Jonathan Mathers, Helen McCarthy, Mike McFarland, Vic Mignogna, Stephanie Nadolny, Phillip Nelson, Jonathan Osborne, Eddie Perkins, Fred Perry, Michael Pondsmith, Radio Comix, Xero Reynolds, Kai Robertson, Rooster Teeth Productions, Joe Rosales, Brian Ruh, Jan Scott-Frazier, Doug Smith, Yasufumi Soejima, Gustavo Sorola, Michael Suarez, Takahiro Umehara, Elin Winkler, Dan Woren, Toshifumi Yoshida, and ZZ.
June 9–11, 2006	Adam's Mark Hotel; Dallas, Texas	12,459	Justin Achilli, Steve Bennett, Eirik Blackwolf, Anthony Brownrigg, Chromelodeon, Emily DeJesus, Robert DeJesus, Ben Dunn, Newton Ewell, Caitlin Glass, Michael Gluck, Darrel Guilbeau, Zel Harris, David Hutchison, Samantha Inoue-Harte, Jonathan Klein, Kotoko, Steve Kyte, Bruce Lewis, Peter Mayhew, Helen McCarthy, Jamie McGonnigal, Vic Mignogna, Jana G. Oliver, Tony Oliver, Jonathan Osborne, Penicillin, Fred Perry, Radio Comix, Xero Reynolds, Rooster Teeth Productions, Jeremy Ross, Kristine Sa, Jan Scott-Frazier, Patrick Seitz, Doug Smith, Gustavo Sorola, Sonny Strait, Jonathan Tarbox, Sean Teague, and Joe Wight.
June 1–3, 2007	Adam's Mark Hotel; Dallas, Texas	14,309	An Cafe, Peter S. Beagle, Steve Bennett, Bleedman, Brian Denham, Newton Ewell, Brian Glass, Kyle Hebert, Matt Herms, Samantha Inoue-Harte, ketchup mania, Steve Kyte, Bruce Lewis, Helen McCarthy, MELL, Vic Mignogna, Chris Patton, Wendy Powell, Scott Ramsoomair, Xero Reynolds, Rooster Teeth Productions, Jan Scott-Frazier, Doug Smith, Gustavo Sorola, Spike Spencer, David Stanworth, The Sun String Quartet, Jonathan Tarbox, Howard Tayler, Billy Tucci, Travis Willingham and Tommy Yune.
May 30 – June 1, 2008	Sheraton Dallas Hotel; Dallas, Texas	15,324	Steve Bennett, Anthony Brownrigg, Budo Grape, Steven Cummings, David Drake, Bill Fawcett, Kyle Hebert, M. Alice LeGrow, Helen McCarthy, Kevin McKeever, Vic Mignogna, Douglas Niles, Chris Patton, Wendy Powell, Monica Rial, The Sun String Quartet, Jonathan Tarbox, Versailles Philharmonic Quintet, and Shinichi Watanabe.
May 29–31, 2009	Sheraton Dallas Hotel; Dallas, Texas	16,037	Lynn Abbey, Vanessa "Vii" Arteaga, Keith Baker, Paul Benjamin, Steve Bennett, Anthony Brownrigg, Camino, John D. Carmack, Megumi Cummings, Steven Cummings, Camilla d'Errico, Brian Denham, Tim Eldred, Newton Ewell, Bill Fawcett, Melanie Fletcher, Anthony Gallela, Oscar J. Garza III, Yaya Han, Mohammad "Hawk" Haque, Kyle Hebert, DJ Infam0us, Samantha Inoue-Harte, Thomas W. Knowles, Steve Kyte, M. Alice LeGrow, Bruce Lewis, Lee Martindale, Helen McCarthy, Mike McFarland, Kevin McKeever, Vic Mignogna, Jody Lynn Nye, Ananth Panagariya, Chris Patton, Wendy Powell, Mike Resnick, Jeremy Ross, S. John Ross, Tony Salvaggio, Jan Scott-Frazier, Doug Smith, Jonathan Tarbox, Michael "Mookie" Terracciano, Jonathan Thompson.
June 4–6, 2010	Sheraton Dallas Hotel; Dallas, Texas	17,596	Abney Park, Robert Axelrod, Peter S. Beagle, Steve Bennett, David Brehm, Anthony Brownrigg, Jon Buran, Ewen Cluney, Sheldon Drzka, Melanie Fletcher, Esther Friesner, Terrance Griep, Yaya Han, Victor Hao, Malcolm Harris, Chris Hazelton, Kyle Hebert, Steve Horton, DJ Infam0us, Thomas W. Knowles, Steve Kyte, Bruce Lewis, Catherine Lundoff, Lee Martindale, Helen McCarthy, Mary Elizabeth McGlynn, Kevin McKeever, DJ Midget, Jim O'Rear, Jan Scott-Frazier, Jonathan Tarbox, Michael "Mookie" Terracciano, Jason Thompson, Ursula Vernon, Crystal Yates, Stephanie Young.
June 10–12, 2011	Sheraton Dallas Hotel; Dallas, Texas	18,447	Lynn Abbey, Vanessa "Vii" Arteaga, Clint Bickham, Blood Stain Child, Jennie Breeden, Brentalfloss, Robert Brown, Anthony Brownrigg, Jon Buran, Chloe Chan, D, Brian Denham, Melanie Fletcher, Kaja Foglio, Phil Foglio, Brad Foster, Esther Friesner, J. Grant, Terrance Griep, Priscilla Hamby, Kyle Hebert, Mark Hildreth, Steve Horton, Amy Howard-Wilson, Mel Hynes, DJ Infam0us, Cherami Leigh, Bruce Lewis, Lee Martindale, Helen McCarthy, Kevin McKeever, Elizabeth Moon, Mandy "AmazonMandy" Moore, Monty Oum, Michael Poe, Amy Reeder, Emmanuel "Master" Rodriguez, Jonathan Tarbox, Adande "sWooZie" Thorne, Laura J. Underwood, and Eric Wile.
June 1–3, 2012	Sheraton Dallas Hotel; Dallas, Texas	21,982	Curtis Arnott, AYABIE, Steve Bennett, Brentalfloss, Nathan Robert Brown, Anthony Brownrigg, CJ Cherryh, Ming Doyle, Sheldon Drzka, Sarah Elkins, Jane Fancher, Melanie Fletcher, Quinton Flynn, Scott Frerichs, Esther Friesner, Catherine E. Hajek-Harris, Bev Hale, Yaya Han, Kyle Hebert, DJ Infam0us, Nick Landis, Chris Layfield, Cherami Leigh, Pascalle Lepas, Russell Lissau, DJ MaRia, Lee Martindale, Helen McCarthy, Vic Mignogna, Elizabeth Moon, Jana G. Oliver, OZ, Meredith Placko, Tak Sakaguchi, Rikki Simons, Sleeping Samurai, Elizabeth Sloan, Jesse Sosa, Dirk Tiede, Harry Turtledove, Lisle Wilkerson, and Tavisha Wolfgarth-Simons.
May 31–June 2, 2013	Hilton Anatole Dallas; Dallas, Texas	22,366	Curtis Arnott, Bea Billany, Exist Trace, Esther Friesner, Todd Haberkorn, Kyle Hebert, Lee Martindale, Kristen McGuire, Vic Mignogna, Elizabeth Moon, Meredith Placko, August Ragone, Sleeping Samurai, Jesse Sosa, Sonny Strait, Take One Productions, Jonathan Tarbox, Cathy Weseluck, and Lisle Wilkerson.
June 6–8, 2014	Hilton Anatole Dallas; Dallas, Texas	26,377	Curtis Arnott, Bea Billany, Anthony Brownrigg, Darren J. Gendron, Caitlin Glass, Yaya Han, Kyle Hebert, Amy Howard-Wilson, Taliesin Jaffe, Nick Landis, M. Alice LeGrow, Lee Martindale, Helen McCarthy, Elizabeth Moon, Gilles Poitras, Lawrence Simpson, Michael Sinterniklaas, Ken Steacy, Take One Productions, Jonathan Tarbox, and J. Michael Tatum.
June 5–7, 2015	Hilton Anatole Dallas; Dallas, Texas	29,383	Curtis Arnott, Nathan Robert Brown, Scott Frerichs, Caitlin Glass, Kyle Hebert, Mitsuhisa Ishikawa, Nick Landis, Bruce Lewis, Kristen McGuire, Amber Nash, Trina Nishimura, Bryce Papenbrook, Tyson Rinehart, Anthony Sardinha, Take One Productions, J. Michael Tatum, and David Vincent.
June 3–5, 2016	Hilton Anatole Dallas; Dallas, Texas	32,639	Airship Isabella, Steve Bennett, Morgan Berry, Jennie Breeden, Nathan Robert Brown, D-Piddy, Rob DenBleyker, David Doub, Megan Emerick, Bill Fawcett, Frenchy and the Punk, J. Grant, Todd Haberkorn, Ben Hamby, Yaya Han, Kyle Hebert, Natalie Rose Hoover, Mel Hynes, Jeremy Inman, Nicole Marie Jean, Ryuu Lavitz, Cherami Leigh, Marquis of Vaudeville, Carl Martin, Kyle "Turtle Smithy" Mathis, Malinda "Malindachan" Mathis, Helen McCarthy, Dave McElfatrick, Kristen McGuire, Matthew Mercer, Alex Moore, Rika Muranaka, Jim O'Rear, Steam Powered Giraffe, Take One Productions, Austin Tindle, LeeAnna Vamp, David Vincent, Kris Wilson, and Yousei Teikoku.
June 8–11, 2017	Fort Worth Convention Center; Fort Worth, Texas	33,102	Ani-Mia, Tia Ballard, Amelie Belcher, Morgan Berry, Chris Bevins, Johnny Yong Bosch, Justin Briner, Clifford Chapin, Amber Lee Connors, Daydreamernessa, Terri Doty, Megan Emerick, Eyeshine, Haenuli, Yaya Han, DJ HeavyGrinder, Kyle Hebert, Matt Herms, Brenda Hickey, Natalie Rose Hoover, Chuck Huber, Caleb Hyles, Imza, Carl Martin, Kyle "Turtle Smithy" Mathis, Malinda "Malindachan" Mathis, Helen McCarthy, Joel McDonald, Kristen McGuire, Brandon McInnis, Erica Mendez, Matthew Mercer, Vic Mignogna, Miss Octopie, Alex Moore, Destiny Nickelsen, Jim O'Rear, Atelier Pierrot, QuantumDestiny, Svetlana Quindt, Rachel Robinson, Christopher Sabat, Jad Saxton, Sonny Strait, Ciarán Strange, Take One Productions, J. Michael Tatum, Austin Tindle, Alexis Tipton, Vitamin H Productions, Jessica von Braun, Sarah Wiedenheft, and Lisle Wilkerson.
June 7–10, 2018	Fort Worth Convention Center; Omni Fort Worth; Sheraton Fort Worth Downtown; Fort Worth, Texas	34,684	Akidearest, The Anime Man, Steve Bennett, Beau Billingslea, BRADIO, Leon Chiro, Richard Epcar, Toshio Furukawa, Toru Furuya, GARNiDELiA, Joshua Hart, DJ HeavyGrinder, Kyle Hebert, Chuck Huber, Shino Kakinuma, Kamui, Mika Kobayashi, Erica Lindbeck, Andrew Love, Helen McCarthy, Matthew Mercer, Vic Mignogna, Miss Octopie, Misty/Chronexia, Naoshi Mizuta, Cassandra Lee Morris, Chris Moujaes, A New World, Jessie Pridemore, Reika, Michelle Rojas, Keith Silverstein, Ellyn Stern, Ciarán Strange, Take One Productions, Twinzik, David Vincent, Vitamin H Productions, Jessica von Braun, Heather Walker, Lisle Wilkerson, Michael "Knightmage" Wilson, and A.K. Wirru.
June 27–30, 2019	Fair Park; Dallas, Texas		Acme, Felecia Angelle, Tia Ballard, Amelie Belcher, Morgan Berry, Chris Bevins, Jessica Calvello, R. Bruce Elliott, Chris Guerrero, Yaya Han, Erika Harlacher, Atelier Heidi, Haruka Kurebayashi, April Martin, Helen McCarthy, Joel McDonald, Phil Mizuno, Moderately Okay Cosplay, Tony Oliver, Rachel Robinson, Ian Sinclair, Evil Ted Smith, Ciarán Strange, Saki Tachibana, Take One Productions, Kaiji Tang, Vitamin H Productions, Christopher Wehkamp, Lisle Wilkerson, and Sarah Anne Williams.
June 3–5, 2022	Irving Convention Center at Las Colinas; Toyota Music Factory; Irving, Texas		Bennett Abara, Steve Bennett, Ray Chase, Ejen Chuang, Khoi Dao, Robbie Daymond, Lucien Dodge, Diana Garnet, Chris Hackney, Yaya Han, Erika Harlacher, Erica Lindbeck, Maridah, Maul Cosplay, Adam McArthur, Joel McDonald, Erica Mendez, Max Mittelman, Xander Mobus, Stephanie Nadolny, PAiDA, Bryce Papenbrook, Cory J. Phillips, Zeno Robinson, Laura Stahl, Ciarán Strange, Take One Productions, Teca, Abby Trott, Eric Vale, Vitamin H Productions, Steff Von Schweetz, Mark Whitten, Take One Productions, and Anne Yatco.
June 2-4, 2023	Irving Convention Center at Las Colinas; Toyota Music Factory; Irving, Texas		Bryson Baugus, Beku Cos, Burnout Syndromes, Darkarnival Butler, SungWon Cho, Cowbutt Crunchies, Ben Diskin, Kara Edwards, Ricco Fajardo, Sandy Fox, Katelyn Gault, Yaya Han, Kaye Cosplay, Lex Lang, Cherami Leigh, Erica Lindbeck, Madkid, Kyle McCarley, Helen McCarthy, Joel McDonald, Phil Mizuno, Nano, Tony Oliver, Cory J. Phillips, Atelier Pierrot, Matthew David Rudd, Ciarán Strange, Take One Productions, Kaiji Tang, Diana "Binkx" Tolin, David Vincent, Vitamin H Productions, Vraskaa, and Sarah Anne Williams.
