= Original English-language manga =

Type of comic book or graphic novel in English

An original English-language manga or OEL manga is a comic book or graphic novel drawn in the style of manga and originally published in English. The term "international manga", as used by the Japanese Ministry of Foreign Affairs, encompasses all foreign comics which draw inspiration from the "form of presentation and expression" found in Japanese manga. This may also apply to manga-inspired comics made in other languages.

== History and nomenclature ==
The growth of manga translation and publishing in the United States has been a slow progression over several decades. The earliest manga-derived series to be released in the United States was a redrawn American adaptation of Osamu Tezuka's Astro Boy published by Gold Key Comics starting in 1965.

In 1979, Gold Key published the comic book Battle of the Planets, based on a television series of the same name. Marvel published a series based Shogun Warriors, bringing characters of the mecha anime and manga series: Brave Raideen, Chodenji Robo Combattler V and Wakusei Robo Danguard Ace.

Original English-language manga first began to appear in the U.S. in the mid-1980s. The San Antonio-based publisher Antarctic Press produced the anthology Mangazine in 1985, and the Ohio-based Rion Productions published two issues of Rion 2990, by Doug Brammer and Ryan Brown, in 1986. Between 1986 and 1988, First Comics published a series about a mecha, Dynamo Joe, created by Doug Rice, it was scripted first by John Ostrander, then by Phil Foglio. Ben Dunn sometimes filled in for Rice on the art.

In the late 1980s, Antarctic and Eternity Comics published manga-inspired works like Ben Dunn's Ninja High School (debuting in 1987) and Jason Waltrip's Metal Bikini (debuting in 1990), as well as adaptations of anime like Captain Harlock, Robotech and Lensman.

As early as 1993, Japan-owned Viz Media issued a line of American manga. Shortened to "Amerimanga", it is thought to be the earliest colloquial name for these types of works. Other variations on OEL manga, such as western manga, world manga, global manga, manga-influenced comics, neo-manga, and nissei comi can occasionally be heard as substitute names, but the term OEL manga is most commonly used today. OEL manga gradually became more widely used, even if usually incorrectly, because it was a more inclusive, global term that included works produced by all English-speakers encompassing works originating in countries such as Canada, Australia, and the United Kingdom as well as in the United States. Anime News Network columnist Carlo Santos made the first recorded use of the term on April 28, 2005, on his personal blog, and others began using it on forums and spreading the popularity of the phrase. By October 2005, publishing industry journal Publishers Weekly was also making use of the term, but manga publishers have yet to use it in official advertisements or press releases.

However the original parent loan word, manga, is still used by publishers such as Tokyopop, HarperCollins, and various small presses as a blanket term for all of their bound graphic novels—without reference to origin or location of its creator(s). The significance of the word, however, has mutated outside Japan as a reference to comics originally published in Japan, regardless of style or language. Merriam-Webster's dictionary defines the word manga as meaning "a Japanese comic or graphic novel", reflecting the change of the meaning this word has had once used outside Japan.

Because the word "manga"—being a Japanese loanword in English use—means comics initially published in Japan, there have been attempts to find more appropriate terms for the growing number of publications of manga created by non-Japanese authors. Beside the term "OEL Manga", there is also the term "manga-influenced comics" (MIC) in use. For example, Megatokyo, which was scheduled to be published by the largest manga producer Kodansha, is still referenced as a "manga-influenced comic".

Anime and manga news site Anime News Network currently uses the term "world manga", coined by Jason DeAngelis of Seven Seas Entertainment, to describe these works in their column entitled Right-Turn Only. In May 2006, Tokyopop officially changed the name of their line of non-Japanese manga to "global manga", considering it a more respectful and accurate term than Amerimanga with its negative connotations of being a sub-par quality of work in comparison to Japanese manga; however, the Tokyopop books themselves, whether they come from Japan, Korea, or some other country, all say manga on them and are shelved in the manga section of the major bookstore chains such as Barnes & Noble alongside Japanese manga, Korean manhwa, Chinese manhua, French la nouvelle manga, and American graphic novels of similar size and dimensions. It is understood, however, that manga does not act as a loanword when used in the original Japanese language and therefore it only takes its original meaning of, simply, comics.

== Creators ==
Notable OEL manga creators include:

- Wes Abbott
- Queenie Chan
- Svetlana Chmakova
- CoryxKenshin
- Mark Crilley
- Nunzio DeFilippis
- Ben Dunn
- Rod Espinosa
- Fred Gallagher
- Amy Kim Ganter
- ILYA
- Sean Lam
- M. Alice LeGrow
- Nina Matsumoto
- Fred Perry
- Madeleine Rosca
- Siku
- Felipe Smith
- Hans Steinbach
- Waltrip brothers
- Adam Warren
- Christina Weir
- Odunze Oguguo
- Eric Wight
- Joseph Wight
- Tommy Yune

== Original English-language manga publishers ==
=== Antarctic Press ===
Antarctic Press most notably publishes the long-running Ninja High School (debuted 1987) and Gold Digger (debuted 1992) comic books, with inspiration from manga in terms of art and high-paced imaginative action/humor storytelling style; and also publishes newer works like Neotopia (debuted 2003). These are consistently collected into pocket-sized paperback format. If the original comics appeared in color, Antarctic Press also publishes the collected manga in color as well.

=== eigoMANGA ===
eigoMANGA publishes two Original English-Language manga anthology comic books and several graphic novel series. Sakura Pakk (debuted 2004) is a shōjo-based anthology graphic novel while Rumble Pak (debuted 2004) is their shōnen-based comic book series. eigoMANGA means "English Comics" in Japanese and they market themselves as OEL manga publishers.

=== Eternity Comics/Malibu Comics ===
Eternity Comics/Malibu Comics was one of the earliest American publishers to adapt popular anime into comics form, and put out original English-language manga. Operated from 1986 to 1994.

=== Kodansha ===
Kodansha is one of the largest publishers in Japan. Through bi-annual international manga contests the company seeks talent outside Japan. According to Eijiro Shimada, editor-in-chief of Morning Two and deputy editor-in-chief of Morning, some readers in Japan are interested in manga produced in other parts of the world.

In May 2004, Kodansha formed a partnership with Del Rey Books called Del Rey Manga to publish many of their books in English in the United States. Some of the more popular titles published by Del Rey Manga include Negima! Magister Negi Magi by Ken Akamatsu and Tsubasa: Reservoir Chronicle by Clamp.

Kodansha published a Japanese language edition of Megatokyo in 2009.

=== Seven Seas Entertainment ===
Seven Seas Entertainment has published many Original English-Language manga and manga-inspired webcomics, such as Amazing Agent Luna (debuted 2005), Aoi House (debuted 2005), Hollow Fields (debuted 2007), and an adaptation of Larry Niven's Ringworld. (Note: Published by Tor Books in 2014)

=== Studio Ironcat ===
Briefly before its closing in 2006, American manga publisher Studio Ironcat published a magazine series called AmeriManga from 2002 to 2003. A few of the titles in the compilation have since moved on to be published in other formats by other companies, most notably TOKYOPOP.

Other similar magazines are still in publication today, including EigoManga's Sakura Pakk and RumblePakk titles; Purrsia Press's Mangatron; Mangazine; and Shōjo. International magazines of the same type include Britain's MangaMover and Sweatdrop; the Australian publication Kiseki; and the Canadian magazine Kitsune.

=== Tokyopop ===
Tokyopop was formerly the world's largest publisher of manga-inspired comics written in the English language, and used to publish over two dozen titles. From 2002 to 2011, the company actively promoted new writers via its popular Rising Stars of Manga annual competition and collection. Several winners from the competition eventually published their own books under the Tokyopop imprint.

In a 2006 deal with HarperCollins, the company announced the expansion of its distribution and new adaptation projects based on American prose novels. It was indicated that Tokyopop planned to produce over 100 new comics over the next two years.

=== Scholastic ===
On Spring 2022, Tezuka Productions launched an international Kickstarter campaign to fund an English-language manga reboot series of Osamu Tezuka's Unico called Unico: Awakening by writer Samuel Sattin and artist duo Gurihiru on Spring 2022. After the campaign was fully funded within 24 hours, Scholastic Corporation announced publication of the series as part of Graphix Imprint on September 20, 2023. Both Scholastic and Tezuka Productions also announced the series to be expanded to 4 volumes with activity and handbooks to accompany them. During San Diego Comic Con 2025, Tezuka Productions and Scholastic announced the series to run for a total of 8 volumes. On August 23, 2024, after the success of Unico, Scholastic announced on publishing more English-language manga for their Graphix imprint such as Hikaru in the Light! and Mecha-Uda: Mechanical Arms which was released in Spring 2025. Followed by Spider-Man: Shadow Warrior by Shogo Aoki which was released September 16, 2025. A YA manga called Crescent Moon Marching is set to release August 4, 2026, for Volume 1 and November 4, 2026, for Volume 2. A manga adaptation of Dav Pilkey's Captain Underpants was released April 7, 2026, where it was illustrated by Motojiro.

On August 19, 2026, Scholastic and Tezuka Productions announced on reimagining 5 of Osamu Tezuka's works into English-language manga series. Titles include Princess Knight, Atom Cat/Astro Cat, The Three-Eyed One, Triton of the Sea, and Zero Men with two unannounced titles.

== Reception ==
According to Lillian Diaz-Przybyl, an editor at Tokyopop, their best selling OEL manga sells about half as well as their best selling Japanese-origin manga.

The trade magazine ICv2 Guide to Manga lists the top 25 and top 50 best-selling manga based on sales data obtained from bookstores and comics shops across the United States. The table below shows those OEL manga that reached the top 25 or top 50 sales status in 2007 and 2008 with their sales ranks and ICv2 references. ICv2's editors write that titles not released during the time period shown tend to drop down or off the list, while titles released during the same time period tend to rise.

OEL Manga in the Top 50 Manga for 2007 and 2008 in the U.S.
Title	Author	Publisher	Rank	Date	Source
Warcraft: The Sunwell Trilogy	Richard A. Knaak	Tokyopop	12/50	Mid-Feb. to mid-May, 2007	ICv2 #45, p. 6
My Dead Girlfriend	Eric Wight	Tokyopop	38/50	Mid-Feb. to mid-May, 2007	ICv2 #45, p. 6
Megatokyo	Fred Gallagher	CMX	25/25	Mid-May to mid-Aug., 2007	ICv2 #47, p. 8
Megatokyo	Fred Gallagher	CMX	33/50	June-Aug., 2007	ICv2 #48, pp. 8, 10
Warcraft: The Sunwell Trilogy	Richard A. Knaak	Tokyopop	45/50	June-Aug., 2007	ICv2 #48, pp. 8, 10
Return to Labyrinth	Jake T. Forbes	Tokyopop	40/50	Sept-Oct, 2007	ICv2 #50, pp. 8–9
Bizenghast	M. Alice LeGrow	Tokyopop	44/50	Sept-Oct, 2007	ICv2 #50, pp. 8–9
Warcraft: The Sunwell Trilogy	Richard A. Knaak	Tokyopop	14/50	Full Year, 2007	ICv2 #51, pp. 8–9
Megatokyo	Fred Gallagher	CMX	26/50	Full Year, 2007	ICv2 #51, pp. 8–9
Return to Labyrinth	Jake T. Forbes	Tokyopop	36/50	Full Year, 2007	ICv2 #51, pp. 8–9
Dramacon	Svetlana Chmakova	Tokyopop	41/50	Full Year, 2007	ICv2 #51, pp. 8–9
Warcraft: The Sunwell Trilogy	Richard A. Knaak	Tokyopop	14/25	Final 2007 (top 25)	ICv2 #52, p. 10
Dramacon	Svetlana Chmakova	Tokyopop	20/50	Jan. to mid-Mar., 2008	ICv2 #54, pp. 8–9
Dark Hunger	Christine Feehan	Berkeley	49/50	Jan. to mid-Mar., 2008	ICv2 #54, pp. 8–9
Dramacon	Svetlana Chmakova	Tokyopop	20/25	Jan. to late-Apr., 2008	ICv2 #55, p. 10
Dark Wraith of Shannara	Terry Brooks	Del Rey	22/50	March to Mid-May, 2008	ICv2 #57, pp. 8–9
In Odd We Trust	Dean Koontz	Del Rey	11/50	May to Mid-July, 2008	ICv2 #59, pp. 8–9
Batman: Gotham Knight	Louise Simonson	Penguin	25/50	May to Mid-July, 2008	ICv2 #59, pp. 8–9

== See also ==
- Anime-influenced animation
- La nouvelle manga
- Manfra, the French equivalent
- Manhua, the Chinese equivalent
- Manhwa, the Korean equivalent
