= Peebo =

Peebo or Peebos may refer to:

- Annely Peebo (born 1971), Estonian mezzo-soprano
- Peebo, a robot character in Choudenshi Bioman, a Japanese television series
- Peebos, self-aware bombs in the Gold Digger comic book series

== See also ==
- Peabo Bryson (born 1951), American singer and songwriter
  - Peabo, his debut album
