= Chesty Sanchez =

Comic book character

- Cover to Chesty Sanchez #1, art by Jay.

Publication information
- Publisher: Antarctic Press
- First appearance: Chesty Sanchez (1995)
- Created by: Steve Ross

In-story information
- Alter ego: Maria Sanchez
- Team affiliations: Pedro Trompeto Alvarez
- Notable aliases: Loca Sanchez
- Abilities: Peak human strength, professional wrestler, access to high-tech equipment

Chesty Sanchez is a fictional character and comic book superheroine created by Steve Ross. The character made her first appearance in Chesty Sanchez #1 (Nov. 1995) published by Antarctic Press.

Maria Sanchez was born in a small village near Cuernavaca, Mexico to a father who had prayed for a son. As if to compensate, Maria grew taller and stronger than any other man in her village. Discovered by a wrestling promoter, Maria began her professional wrestling career under the tantalizing name "Chesty Sanchez". A scandal forced her to retire and return home to help with her parents' store. Due to her former popularity as a wrestler, the Frijoles de Oro food company approached Maria with an offer to become a real-life superhero and mascot of the Frijoles de Oro company. At most, this was merely a publicity stunt, but Maria agreed in order to help with her parents' expenses. Assisted by several supporting characters, including a side-kick named Trompeto, and utilizing her own athletic fighting ability, Maria has become an established and well respected crime-fighting celebrity in Mexico.

== Publication history ==
Ross was approached by artist Lyndal Ferguson from Rock 'n' Roll Comics in the late '80s to create a story for an "all adult" comics anthology he was developing at the time. Ross created a story which featured more toilet humor than anything explicit and introduced a new "sexy" character for the anthology named Chesty Sanchez.

The name itself was intended to be ironic; while the character was curvy and voluptuous, she had very realistic proportions. Much of Chesty's visual design was based on Mexican actresses, singers and pop stars as Ross had wanted to avoid the exaggerated and over-sexed images that plagued female comic characters. Chesty was also one of the few American comics characters to have a professional wrestling theme. As there were very few sources of information available in English, Ross relied mostly on classic Mexican wrestling films, including Las Luchadoras contra la Momia (Wrestling Women vs. The Mummy). Ross also incorporated influences from classic pulp superheroes such as Zorro, The Domino Lady, The Phantom Detective, and The Spider. Chesty's costume design was based entirely on the classic Mexican mariachi garb, with the exception of the domino mask which was intended as a nod to the aforementioned pulp figures.

After completing the story, Lyndal changed his anthology series to a single story-arc, one which did not feature Chesty Sanchez. Ross was able to retain his rights to the newly created character, and presented it to Antarctic Press who was currently publishing his work on the Zetraman series. Antarctic was receptive to the idea and allowed Ross to pursue a three issue mini-series. Ross wrote the script for the planned three-part story-arc, which would feature the origin of the Chesty Sanchez character, while interior artwork was completed by Scott Michaud. The mini-series was first published by Antarctic Press in 1995, which was later compiled into one ninety-six-page special issue.

The series is currently on hiatus, although Ross has written a prose story under the more "family-friendly" name of "Loca Sanchez".

== Fictional character history ==
According to her origin story from Chesty Sanchez #1, Maria was born in a small village just outside Cuernavaca. Maria grew stronger and taller than any other man in her village, and learned to defend herself. She was discovered at the age of nineteen by a vacationing wrestling promoter after roughing up one of the local street-punks. Traveling to Mexico City, Maria signed on as wrestler and began her wrestling career under the name of Chesty Sanchez. Due to a clerical error, Chesty's first match was scheduled to be with the male wrestler called El Terror Negro. Despite the mix-up, Chesty won the match and thereby the respect of the lucha libre fans. Chesty became a popular icon of the Mexican professional wrestling circuit until allegations arose that she had been cheating in her matches and illegal drugs and dirty money where found in her dressing room. Unable to defend herself against such accusations, Maria resolved to retire and avoid the lime-light.

One day while working at her father's store, Maria was approached by taxi-driver Pedro "Trompeto" Alvarez, who reveals that Frijoles de Oro is in need of her talents. As a publicity stunt, Frijoles de Oro hires both Maria and Trompeto to act as Mexico's first superheroes. Maria reluctantly agreed to don her former persona of Chesty Sanchez, only to help with her parents' expenses. Given a new costume, advanced technology, and sidekick Trompeto, Maria could now wage a war on crime. It was during her first adventure that she discovered the drug and gambling scandal that ended her career was actually the work of some jealous rivals. Having her name cleared and saving Mexico from certain doom, Maria was once again popular with the citizens of Mexico City.

A cross-over all-text storyline with Ben Dunn's Warrior Nun Areala featured in Antarctic Press' Manganize, revised much of the character's background. Maria is never referred to as "Chesty Sanchez" but instead earned the name "Loca Sanchez" due to her short temper in the ring. Maria was discovered by the vacationing wrestling promoter when she was beating up a local boy who had spread rumors that he "had his way with her". The promoter did not sign her on simply because of her impressive fighting ability, but more for the gimmick of having a woman fighter beat a man in the wrestling ring. The scandal that ended her career is shown to be much more damaging, costing her family much more in legal battles. The story also incorporated other independent characters such as Richard Dominguez's El Gato Negro, Margarito C. Garza's Relampago, Carlos Saldaña's Burrito, and Laura Molina's The Jaguar.

== Skills, abilities, and resources ==
At 6' 3", Chesty Sanchez is taller than most of the male wrestlers in Mexico; she's also considerably stronger than many men her size. She has an absolutely unbreakable, vise-like grip. When she plants her feet down, it is impossible to move Chesty, or to knock her over. She doesn't perform a lot of "high-flying" maneuvers (off of ropes and turnbuckles): A botched attempt at an aerial dive left Chesty with a limp that she has managed to turn into a swagger. Even when she's in a "real" fight (out of the wrestling ring), Chesty never broke the habit of stomping her foot when she throws a punch. Several wrestling have succumbed to Chesty's size, strength, and infamous temper; a long list of injured, infuriated victims forced Chesty Sanchez to leave professional wrestling for a few years.
