= Destiny's Hand =

Original English-language manga

- Cover of Destiny's Hand vol. 1 (2006), art by Mel Calingo
- Genre: Action/adventure
- Author: Nunzio DeFilippis, Christina Weir
- Illustrator: Mel Calingo
- Publisher: (United States) Seven Seas Entertainment
- Original run: 2006 – Present

Destiny's Hand is a pirate Original English-language manga written by Nunzio DeFilippis and Christina Weir (authors of Amazing Agent Luna), with art by Mel Calingo. It is published by Seven Seas Entertainment and the first volume came out in 2006.

Destiny's Hand is no longer running as a webmanga on Seven Seas Entertainment's site and has been replaced by the Moonlight Meow manga. The rest of the series is now only in print form.

== Plot ==
The story begins with a flashback to when Olivia is thirteen. Olivia is in arranged marriage that she is determined to escape. The ship she and her parents are traveling on is taken by the Destiny's Hand. When Diego threatens her father, Olivia manages to defeat him with a knife and her wits. Captain Blaine gives her a favor, and Olivia asks to join the crew of the Destiny's Hand. Her father disowns her, and she joins the crew of Destiny's Hand.

Three years later, it is Owen who is telling Olivia's story to their captives. When they are about to depart, they are attacked by the 'Kraken', Mulgrew's ship. After a fierce battle, Blaine's only good lung had been pierced. With Captain Blaine dying, he appoints the only person he considers brave enough to lead a crew to find the Devil's Eye: Olivia Soldana. Blaine then tells of Destiny's Hand's Five Fingers that guide her, Olivia, Diego, Matthau, and Badru. He also tells them of the Fifth finger, a scholar who reads the ancient language of Priscus.

After, the crew heads to Vickensburg where they attempt to recruit Elias, the Governor's son and the Index finger who should point the way to the Devil's Eye. Blaine gives them a picture of the ship's Figurehead, Lady Kate and tells them that showing it to him should convince him to join them. Olivia and Badru sneak into the governor's mansion and ask Elias. Elias refuses to join them, so Olivia and Badru leave the picture and return to the ship.

Upon their return, it is revealed that Elias is Blaine's son. It also reveals some of Blaine's past and the story of Lady Kate. Lady Kate was actually based on a woman named Katherine who was going to be forced to marry the governor's son. She asked for passage of Blaine's ship. Katherine practiced some sort of magic, a form of future sight and used it to steer Blaine's ship in the right direction, and avoid storms. She also sees the future Mulgrew's attempt to capture the Devil's Eye, and when she was pregnant, she told Blaine she had to marry the governor's son so that their son would grow up to be a scholar. Katherine later died in childbirth.

Olivia then goes back to the governor's mansion and kidnaps Elias and brings him back to Destiny's Hand. She then tells him Blaine is his father. When Elias and Blaine meet face-to-face, Elias points a gun to Blaine's head, stating that his father is the Governor of Vickensburg.

Blaine tells the others to leave while he talks with Elias. After some time, Elias joins them in the search for the Devil's Eye and calls Blaine “father”. Inside the library in Valroux, Elias and Olivia learn that a new law has been passed: “Any pirate found on Valroux soil is to be detained, tried, and executed.” Even the pirates of Destiny's Hand are no exception. Olivia is forced to wound Michel so he isn't seen allied with the pirates.

From the book Elias stole, he manages to figure out that the book was about Josiah Zevon's quest in search of the Devil's Eye. Apparently he had a map to Isle du Diablo. He tore it into quarters, gave three to his most trusted lieutenants, and kept the fourth to himself. Matthau was once a cabin boy aboard Zevon's ship. He knew that Zevon retired to a small island, northwest of Permonde. Later, the Kraken is following them. From a message inside a bottle, Mulgrew learns of Destiny's Hand's crew fallout and that they have a piece of the map and going to get another.

Sometime later, Blaine asks Owen to write the tales of Olivia's adventures after he finishes with Blaine's. When Owen leaves, Blaine tells Olivia that he wants the crew to accept her as captain before telling them of Blaine's sickness. Olivia, Matthau, Badru, and Owen journey to Zevon's island. They learn that Zevon burnt his piece of the map. When they leave, Zevon didn't burn it but hid it. Back on the ship, Elias touches Lady Kate figurehead and hears a voice in his head. She tells him that they are in danger. When Zevon tried to finally burn the map, Mulgrew stopped him.

== Characters ==
=== Destiny’s Hand ===
A crew of pirates under Captain Blaine, who follows the pirate code.

- Sebastian Blaine

Captain of the "Destiny's Hand," he is a noble captain and a gentleman pirate. Sadly, his breed is dying. He is in search for the Devil's Eye, so the new, violent pirates can't get it, for example, Lars Mulgrew. His ship, the Destiny's Hand, is said to be unsinkable. He is renowned for sparing the crew and passengers that surrender him. He will merely take the cargo and escort the ship safely to port. When Mulgrew took out his one good lung, Blaine is confirmed to be dying.

- Lady Kate

Lady Kate is the figurehead on Destiny's Hand. Some say it's her protection that makes the ship unsinkable. The only thing certain about her is that Lady Kate is inspired by a real woman (Katherine Marsh), someone who meant a lot to Captain Blaine further the figurehead of Lady Kate also has a sadness about her that seems to hint a lot about her story.

- Owen Galviston

Though he came aboard the Destiny's Hand to write a biography of Blaine, he hasn't for six years and has stayed on the ship since remaining a 'guest' of the crew. He is the one who tells the story of young Olivia at the beginning of the series.

- Wyatt

Wyatt joined the crew two years after Olivia joins the crew. He's last name is unknown. He is the lookout aboard Destiny's Hand. He has keen eyesight and a tendency to be in places he should not be, and someday dreams of working with the sails rather than being a lookout.

==== Destiny’s Hand’s Five Fingers ====
- Frederick Matthau

He is the strategist and navigator aboard Destiny's Hand, and said to be the best at reading both situations and maps. Matthau is also said to be an excellent judge of character, who by his own nature is a very solitary and lonely man keeping most of his contact with Blaine. Matthau is the Thumb of Destiny's Hand. It is the finger that is the leader of the rest.

- Elias Houghton

Son of Governor Houghton of St. Vickensburg, who has inherited his father's distaste for pirates. However, this is a problem for Blaine, who needs his help for the last quest he is setting out to fulfill. Elias is actually Blaine's son. When he finally accepts Blaine as his real father, he will start to say “father” instead of “captain.” Elias is the Index finger of Destiny’s Hand. He is the scholar who speaks Priscus and the key to the map to the Devil’s Eye.

- Diego Basteon

Boatswain aboard the "Destiny's Hand," works hard to keep discipline amongst the crew and as such has become one of Blaine's key lieutenants. His weapon of choice is a cat-o-nine-tails with which he is very effective. He has a very bad temper. Diego is the Middle finger of Destiny's Hand. It represents aggression and discipline.

- Olivia Soldana

The daughter of a rich family, Olivia left her family behind to join Blaine's crew. She is 16 years of age and the main character in Destiny's Hand. She became Captain Blaine's right-hand woman and the one to lead his crew on one last adventure after his death. However, it is hard for the crew to trust her because she is a girl, no matter how strong or brave. She is the Ring finger of Destiny's hand. It represents family and commitment to the future.

- Badru

A native from one of the local islands. He admires Blaine's gentlemanly way with piracy. He is considered by Owen to be stupid, but Olivia claims that he is the smartest man aboard, probably because of his survival skills. He is also one of the few members of the crew who can read and write. Badru is the Pinky of Destiny's Hand, which represents promises given and of trust. Badru was completely redesigned from his original model to make him stand out more.

=== The Kraken ===
- Lars Mulgrew

He is a symbol of everything that Blaine hates, following a path of pillage and killing rather than the more peaceful one Blaine desires all pirates to follow. He takes Blaine's last good lung, which causes Blaine to appoint Olivia as captain.

- The Kraken

Mulgrew's ship is called The Kraken, named after one of the most feared mythical creatures of the deep. Since Destiny's Hand has Lady Kate, the Kraken has its own figurehead. This figurehead inspires terror in all who behold it.

=== Others ===
- Michel Langrisse

Captain of the defense fleet of the port of Valroux, which is a very pirate-friendly port. Blaine's crew is particularly welcome because they never hurt innocents and try to avoid killing anyone. He is later revealed to be the man whom Olivia was arranged to marry. He has a quite laidback attitude, but he knows when to put his foot down and take order again. In the series, Michel and Olivia have some kind of a relationship.

- Thomas Houghton

Governor of St. Vickensburg, and very anti-pirate making his port very dangerous for pirates to get anywhere near. Also due to his personal troubles with Captain Blaine in the past, something neither man will talk about, there is very bad blood between them, fueling his general hatred of all pirates.

- Katherine Marsh

She is the governess and wife of Thomas Houghton of St. Vickensburg. She was predestined to meet Blaine at the ports of St. Vickensburg seventeen years ago. She asked to aboard his ship to escape her marriage to Thomas. She has the ability to foretell the future. Eventually she and Blaine fell in love. When she became pregnant with Blaine’s son, she broke her relationship with Blaine, telling him that one day Destiny’s Hand’s crew will be the last of good, decent pirates. When that happens, Mulgrew will seek the Devil’s Eye and if he should claim it, tragedy will rain down upon the world. She said Elias will be the one to help Blaine, otherwise Blaine will not succeed. If she marries Thomas, Elias will have access to the finest teachers, libraries and institutions to become a scholar and learn the language of the ancients. Before she left, she placed a piece of her soul into Destiny’s Hand’s figurehead, into Lady Kate, and asked her to protect the ship as she once had. Afterwards, Katherine died of childbirth.

== Resources ==
Seven Seas Entertainment's Destiny's Hand Sketch Pads 1 through 13
