= World Manga =

World Manga may refer to:

- Original English-language manga, comic books in the "international manga" genre originally published in English
- Seven Seas Entertainment, a publishing company located in Los Angeles, California
