= Nichiren (book) =

2015 manga by Murakami and Tanaka

First edition

Nichiren is a 2015 historical original English-language manga written by Masahiko Murakami and illustrated by Ken Tanaka. Published by Middleway Press in the United States, about the priest Nichiren.

The book uses black and white illustrations.

== Reception ==
April Spisak, the latter writing in Bulletin of the Center for Children's Books, stated that even though the plot had some fictionalization, persons who are interested in the fields of Buddhism or the history of Japan would find the book "a surprisingly rich resource". She stated that the large sizes of the information and text present may make the book "a bit daunting" for a casual reader.

Kirkus Reviews stated that it is "compelling nonetheless and smartly interpreted". Kirkus Reviews criticized the lack of background information and a lack of explanation of the mantra "Nam-myoho-renge-kyo", which frequently appears in the book, and it also criticized how the only supplementary source given in the book was the publisher's website.
