= Radio Comix =

American comic book publishing company

- Founded: 1996
- Founder: Pat Duke; Elin Winkler
- Country of origin: United States of America
- Headquarters location: San Antonio, Texas
- Publication types: Comic books
- Fiction genres: Furry, Manga, Erotic
- Imprints: Sin Factory
- Official website: Official website

Radio Comix is an alternative comic book publishing company based in San Antonio, Texas, United States. Founded in 1996 by former Antarctic Press employees Elin Winkler and Pat Duke, Radio Comix has published hundreds of comics from many genres, from both American-created and translated Japanese manga to anthropomorphic to adults-only books under their Sin Factory imprint. Their Furrlough title is the longest-running comic anthology in the US.

== History ==
Radio Comix was formed in late 1996, shortly after a change in publishing strategy at Antarctic Press. Looking to cut costs and focus more on more mainstream properties, Antarctic discontinued publishing all translated manga, anthropomorphic and adults-only titles. Radio Comix was formed by two former Antarctic Press employees, Elin Winkler and Pat Duke. Two of the cancelled titles, Furrlough and Genus, both of which were long-running anthology titles, formed the backbone of the company, and helped provide a platform that allowed Radio Comix to add more titles and artists.

In 2001, Radio Comix created the Sin Factory imprint, to help distinguish its adults-only titles (such as Milk and Genus) from the general-audience titles.

As of 2006, Radio Comix had published over 400 comic book issues and a dozen trade paperbacks.

In 2009, Radio Comix began publishing on their website several free webcomics.

As of 2020, Furrlough is the longest-running anthology comic book at over 190 issues, and Genus is the longest-running adults-only comic book at over 90 issues. Other long-running titles include the adult anthology Milk at over 60 issues, and Mangaphile at 24 issues.

== Titles (selected) ==
- Big Funnies, 8 issues (May 2001 – Feb. 2003)
- Bureau of Mana Investigation, 8 issues (Jan. 2002 – May 2003)
- Dangerous, 2 issues (2005–2006)
- Eureka!, 4 issues (Apr.–Nov. 2000)
- Furrlough, 141 issues (as of Nov. 2019) (Apr. 1997 – present)—taken over from Antarctic Press
- Gold Digger: Edge Guard, 7 issues (Aug. 2000 – Aug. 2001)
- Havoc Inc, 9 issues (Mar. 1998 – Nov. 2001)
- Hit the Beach, 11 issues (1997–2008)
- Liberty from Hell, 6 issues (Aug. 2003 – Aug. 2004)
- Mangaphile, 24 issues (Aug. 1999 – June 2004)
- Mechanical Man Blues, 3 issues (Dec. 1998 – Nov. 1999)
- Morning Glory, 6 issues (Sept. 1998 – July 1999)
- Trouble Express, 4 issues (Nov. 1998 – May 1999)
- Wild Zoo, 8 issues (July 2000 – 2001)

=== Sin Factory titles (selected) ===
- Filthy Animals, 3 issues (Aug. 1997 – 1998)
- Genus, 74 issues (as of Nov. 2019) (Apr. 1997 – present)—taken over from Antarctic Press
- Genus Male, 13 issues (Jan. 2002 – Jan. 2014)
- Milk, 63 issues (1997 – May 2008)
- Pornotopia, 5 issues (1999–2000)
