= Amazing Agent Luna =

Original English-language manga series

- Cover of Amazing Agent Luna vol. 2 (July 2005), art by Shiei
- Genre: Action/adventure, romance
- Author: Nunzio DeFilippis, Christina Weir
- Illustrator: Shiei
- Publisher: Seven Seas Entertainment
- Original run: 2005–2015
- Volumes: 11

Amazing Agent Luna is an original English-language manga series written by Nunzio DeFilippis and Christina Weir (also authors of Destiny's Hand), with art by Shiei. It is published by Seven Seas Entertainment, and was one of the company's initial titles upon establishment. It is one of their best-selling OEL manga, even placing on the New York Times Manga Best Seller List.

During the original run of the comic, a prequel, titled Amazing Agent Jennifer, was also written by DeFilippis and Weir, but with art done by Kriss Sison. It focuses on Dr. Jennifer Kajiwara, Luna's biological mother, before she became her control agent in the main story.

== Plot ==
The story follows Luna, a genetically engineered super-spy created by the US government. Raised in isolation and trained only as a spy, at the age of 15, Luna is assigned to pose as a normal high school girl. Since she never knew real parents or friends, the situation is confusing for her, but she makes friends with Oliver, a skater with a crush on her; and Francesca, a nice girl who used to be friends with Luna's rival. However, she also has to deal with the emotions and events faced by many teenagers, and the fact that the boy she develops a crush on, Jonah, is the son of her main enemy, Count Von Brucken.

== Release ==
=== "Amazing Agent Luna" Volume list ===
No.	North American release date	North American ISBN
01	March 1, 2005	978-1-933164-00-7
File 1 – "Amazing Agent"; File 2 – "Nobel High"; File 3 – "Bad Boy"; File 4 – "First Crush"; File 5 – "Mysterious Birds"; File 6 – "Mission Accomplished?"
02	July 20, 2005	978-1-933164-04-5
File 7 – "Family Week"; File 8 – "Unexpected Arrivals"; File 9 – "Bonding"; File 10 – "Memories"
03	May 17, 2006	978-1-933164-10-6
File 11 – "Ten Years Ago..."; File 12 – "Evolutions"; File 13 – "Night of the Owl"; File 14 – "Best Friend"; File 15 – "The Big Rescue"; File 16 – "Split Second"
04	October 17, 2007	978-1-933164-50-2
File 17 – "Bad Hair Day"; File 18 – "The Perfect Mate"; File 19 – "Clone Wars"; File 20 – "Doctor's Orders"; File 21 – "Twists and Turns"
Omnibus I	May 27, 2008	978-1-933164-74-8
Volumes 1-3
05	November 25, 2008	978-1-934876-39-8
File 22 – "A New Direction"; File 23 – "Two Weeks Later"; File 24 – "Family Secrets"; File 25 – "Project Scion"; File 26 – "The Big Dance"; File 27 – "Epilogue"
Omnibus II	October 27, 2009	978-1-934876-66-4
Volumes 4-5
06	September 28, 2010	978-1-934876-89-3
File 28 – "Back to School"; File 29 – "Flirting with Danger"; File 30 – "Mysterious Strangers"; File 31 – "Personal Affairs"; File 32 – "The Knight Errant"; File 33 – "Everything Changes"
07	July 5, 2011	978-1-934876-46-6
File 34 – "Just Another Evening..."; File 35 – "Trust Issues"; File 36 – "Strange Bedfellows"; File 37 – "Betrayals"; File 38 – "Tick Tick Boom!"; File 39 – "Fallout"
Omnibus III	March 13, 2012	978-1-935934-15-8
Volumes 6-7
08	December 11, 2012	978-1-935934-19-6
File 40 – "Terminus"; File 41; File 42; File 43; File 44
09	June 18, 2013	978-1-937867-29-4
File 45 – "Gone"; File 46; File 47; File 48; File 49; File 50
Omnibus IV	February 4, 2014	978-1-937867-73-7
Volumes 8-9
10	April 14, 2014	978-1-937867-80-5
File 51 – "Who's Controlling Who?"; File 52; File 53; File 54; File 55; File 56
11	October 27, 2015	978-1-626920-90-3
File 57 – "Mother and Child Reunion"
Omnibus V	December 15, 2015	978-1-626921-34-4
Volumes 10-11

=== "Amazing Agent Jennifer" Volume list ===
No.	North American release date	North American ISBN
01	August 2, 2011	978-1-934876-85-5
File 1 – "Misunderestimated"; File 2 – "New Recruit"; File 3 – "The Device"; File 4 – "Graduation Day"; File 5 – "Beautiful Bruckenstein"
02	January 2, 2012	978-1-935934-09-7
File 6 – "Captured"; File 7 – "So Misled"; File 8 – "Unhappy Endings"; File 9 – "Interlude"; File 10 – "Endings and Beginnings"
Omnibus	September 4, 2012	978-1-935934-82-0
Volumes 1-2
