= Metrocon =

Anime convention in Tampa, Florida

Coordinates: 27°56′30.12″N 82°27′24.12″W

- Status: Active
- Genre: Anime, Video Gaming
- Venue: Tampa Convention Center
- Location: Tampa, Florida
- Country: United States
- Inaugurated: 2003
- Attendance: 12,153 in 2021
- Organizer: Team Dynamite Productions
- Website: http://www.metroconventions.com/

Metrocon is an annual three-day anime convention held during July/August at the Tampa Convention Center in Tampa, Florida, United States. It is Florida's largest anime convention and organized by Team Dynamite Productions. The convention evolved from meetups of AnimeMetro.com members.

== Programming ==
The convention typically offers an artist alley, autograph sessions, contests, dances/raves, LAN gaming, main events (such as the Anime Human chess Match, Costume and Cosplay Contests, Fantasy Masquerade, Fire Show, and Professional Wrestling), panels, tabletop game rooms, vendors room, video game rooms, and video rooms screening anime. Metrocon also hosts a blood drive. The convention brought $3.5 million to the area's economy as of 2016, and about $3.3 million as of 2025.

== History ==
Metrocon was first held in 2003 at the Crowne Plaza Hotel and after growth moved to the Tampa Convention Center in 2005. The convention had issues in 2008 with rowdy attendees from the Red Bull Flugtag event also occurring at the Tampa Convention Center. In 2009, the founder and CEO of Metrocon was arrested in Florida for violating Florida Statute 794.05 (unlawful sexual activity with certain minors) eight days before the convention. The conventions Director of Operations characterized the arrest as "an attack on the convention". The CEO stepped down from his position, with the Director of Operations and Head of Security taking over operations.

The convention added a fourth day when unique attendance hit over 10,000, with the first occurring in 2015. Game five of the 2015 Stanley Cup playoff finals was held during Metrocon 2015 at the Amalie Arena. Metrocon 2020 was cancelled due to the COVID-19 pandemic.

=== Event history ===
Dates	Location	Atten.	Guests
July 18–20, 2003	Crowne Plaza Hotel; Tampa, Florida	1,600	Greg Ayres, Luci Christian, Vic Mignogna, Chris Patton, Gerry Poulos, Monica Rial, Don Rush, and Shadowfax.
July 9–11, 2004	Crowne Plaza Hotel; Tampa, Florida	2,400	Greg Ayres, Katie Bair, Luci Christian, Emily DeJesus, Robert DeJesus, Vic Mignogna, Monica Rial, Don Rush, Shadowfax, Doug Smith, and David L. Williams.
June 24–26, 2005	Tampa Convention Center; Tampa, Florida	3,600	Greg Ayres, Johnny Yong Bosch, Luci Christian, Eyeshine, Lauren Goodnight, Cynthia Martinez, Vic Mignogna, Chris Patton, Monica Rial, Shadowfax, Doug Smith, John Swasey, and David L. Williams.
June 2–4, 2006	Tampa Convention Center; Tampa, Florida	4,000	Greg Ayres, Steve Bennett, Johnny Yong Bosch, Luci Christian, Eyeshine, Lauren Goodnight, Kyle Jones, Cynthia Martinez, Marc Matney, Scott McNeil, Chris Patton, PikaBelleChu, PLID, Monkey Punch, Random Encounter, Christopher Sabat, seek, Shadowfax, Doug Smith, John Swasey, David L. Williams, and YURAsama.
July 6–8, 2007	Tampa Convention Center; Tampa, Florida	5,400	Greg Ayres, Laura Bailey, Steve Bennett, Johnny Yong Bosch, Luci Christian, Ashley Clark, Emily DeJesus, Robert DeJesus, Eyeshine, Lauren Goodnight, Yaya Han, Kyle Jones, Cynthia Martinez, Scott McNeil, Vic Mignogna, Random Encounter, Shadowfax, Doug Smith, John Swasey, and David L. Williams.
July 18–20, 2008	Tampa Convention Center; Tampa, Florida		Greg Ayres, Steve Bennett, Johnny Yong Bosch, Greg Cipes, Cipes and the People, Ashley Clark, Eyeshine, Lauren Goodnight, Yaya Han, DJ Heavygrinder, The Heroes Alliance, Scott McNeil, Random Encounter, Select Start, Shadowfax, Doug Smith, David Stanworth, and David L. Williams.
June 19–21, 2009	Tampa Convention Center; Tampa, Florida		Abney Park, ArcAttack, Ashley Clark, Brian Drummond, Yaya Han, Mark Hildreth, Scott McNeil, Kirby Morrow, Outland Armour, PikaBelleChu, Random Encounter, Shadowfax, Doug Smith, David Stanworth, Brad Swaile, and David L. Williams.
July 23–25, 2010	Tampa Convention Center; Tampa, Florida	6,665	Robert Axelrod, Ashley Clark, Richard Ian Cox, Yaya Han, DJ Hellroy, KellyJane, Scott McNeil, Kirby Morrow, Outland Armour, Aaron Pabon, Pikabellechu, Random Encounter, Anna Rosato, RJ Schafer, Shadowfax, Spike Spencer, David Standworth, and TealPirate.
June 17–19, 2011	Tampa Convention Center; Tampa, Florida	7,477	Max Brooks, Ashley Clark, Kara Edwards, Crispin Freeman, Yaya Han, Kyle Hebert, DJ Hellroy, KellyJane, Scott McNeil, Outland Armour, PikaBelleChu, Random Encounter, Shadowfax, Doug Smith, David Stanworth, Brad Swaile, TealPirate, and Terrance Zdunich.
June 15–17, 2012	Tampa Convention Center; Tampa, Florida	8,033	Amelie Belcher, Ashley Clark, Richard Epcar, Crispin Freeman, DJ Hellroy, KellyJane, Mary Elizabeth McGlynn, Scott McNeil, PikaBelleChu, Doug Smith, David Stanworth, Takayoshi Tanimoto, and TealPirate.
July 26–28, 2013	Tampa Convention Center; Tampa, Florida	9,951	Dante Basco, Amelie Belcher, Ashley Clark, D.C. Douglas, DJ Hellroy, KellyJane, Phil LaMarr, Scott McNeil, PikaBelleChu, Doug Smith, David Stanworth, TealPirate, and Janet Varney.
July 11–13, 2014	Tampa Convention Center; Tampa, Florida	11,776	Troy Baker, Dante Basco, Amelie Belcher, Richard Epcar, Brittney Karbowski, KellyJane, Mary Elizabeth McGlynn, Scott McNeil, Nolan North, PikaBelleChu, Random Encounter, Doug Smith, David Stanworth, Ellyn Stern, TealPirate, and Hynden Walch.
June 11–14, 2015	Tampa Convention Center; Tampa, Florida		Laura Bailey, Amelie Belcher, Robbie Daymond, KellyJane, Carrie Keranen, Laugh Out Loud, Russell Lissau, Scott McNeil, Erica Mendez, Nolan North, PikaBelleChu, Stephanie Sheh, David Stanworth, TealPirate, and Travis Willingham.
July 21–24, 2016	Tampa Convention Center; Tampa, Florida		Zach Aguilar, Amelie Belcher, Steve Bennett, Richard Ian Cox, Robbie Daymond, Haiden Hazard, KellyJane, Max Mittelman, Kirby Morrow, PikaBelleChu, Laura Post, David Stanworth, Brooke Stephenson, Eric Stuart, TealPirate, and Cristina Vee.
August 3–6, 2017	Tampa Convention Center; Tampa, Florida	11,604	Steve Blum, Ray Chase, Robbie Daymond, Caleb Hyles, Mary Elizabeth McGlynn, Scott McNeil, Vic Mignogna, Max Mittelman, PikaBelleChu, Paul St. Peter, and Cristina Vee.
July 19–22, 2018	Tampa Convention Center; Tampa, Florida		Caleb Hyles, Jamie Marchi, Jason Marsden, Scott McNeil, Noise Complaint, Micah Solusod, David Stanworth, J. Michael Tatum, Jeannie Tirado, and Apphia Yu (Ayu Sakata).
July 11–14, 2019	Tampa Convention Center; Tampa, Florida	13,135	3000 Brigade, Luci Christian, Kara Edwards, Geekapella, Jessie James Grelle, Caleb Hyles, David Matranga, Nerds Know, NoFlutter, Noise Complaint, Monica Rial, and Alexis Tipton.
July 23–25, 2021	Tampa Convention Center; Tampa, Florida	12,153	Justin Briner, Chalk Twins, Ricco Fajardo, Caleb Hyles, David Matranga, Nerds Know, Emily Neves, NoFlutter, Noise Complaint, Anairis Quiñones, and Christopher Wehkamp.
July 15–17, 2022	Tampa Convention Center; Tampa, Florida		Felecia Angelle, Azazus, Tia Ballard, Chalk Twins, Clifford Chapin, Luci Christian, Ricco Fajardo, Caleb Hyles, Kaiju Big Battel, Kristen McGuire, Nerds Know, Noise Complaint, Megan Shipman, and Natalie Van Sistine.
July 14–16, 2023	Tampa Convention Center; Tampa, Florida		Kevin Bolk, Ricco Fajardo, Bridget Hoffman, Natalie Rose Hoover, Caleb Hyles, Brittany Lauda, Erica Lindbeck, Brandon McInnis, Nano, Tony Oliver, J. Michael Tatum, Chris Tergliafera, Kirk Thornton, Kaoru Wada, and Jonathan Young.
July 5–7, 2024	Tampa Convention Center; Tampa, Florida	Nearly 20,000	E. Jason Liebrecht, Emi Lo, Elizabeth Maxwell, Adam McArthur, Kristen McGuire, Trina Nishimura, Alejandro Saab, Alysan Tabbitha, Kaiji Tang, and Anne Yatco.
July 25-27, 2025	Tampa Convention Center; Tampa, Florida		Tia Ballard, Brian Beacock, Charmanda, Ben Diskin, Ricco Fajardo, Jessie James Grelle, Kaye Cosplay, Lady Cels, Emi Lo, Indra Rojas, Michelle Rojas, Jonah Scott, Sarah Spaceman, and Joshua Waters.
July 31 - August 2, 2026	Tampa Convention Center; Tampa, Florida		A.J. Beckles, Griffin Burns, Lizzie Freeman, Caitlin Glass, Damien Haas, Caleb Hyles, Anjali Kunapaneni, Kayleigh McKee, Erica Mendez, Anairis Quiñones, Alex Rochon, Jonah Scott, Keith Silverstein, Sarah Spaceman, Twinfools, David Vincent, Joshua Waters, and Suzie Yeung.

== Amano's World ==
In 2006, Metrocon held a second convention known as Metrocon: Amano's World, which featured the works Yoshitaka Amano, who is best known for his Final Fantasy character designs and Vampire Hunter D illustrations.

=== Event history ===
Dates	Location	Atten.	Guests
October 14–15, 2006	Tampa Convention Center; Tampa, Florida		Yoshitaka Amano, Steve Bennett, Lauren Goodnight, Random Encounter, and Doug Smith.
