= Lauren Goodnight =

American voice actress and radio host

- Born: May 19, 1980 (age 44); South Carolina, United States
- Occupation(s): Radio Host, Voice Actress, Sex Educator
- Years active: 1996–present

Lauren Goodnight (born May 19, 1980) is an American radio host, voice actress, sex educator, and occasional singer.

== Career ==
Goodnight has been the host for the call-in show 8-bit Sex on the 8bitx.com website and Celestia Radio, Fridays at 10pm EST. She is a professional member of the International Society for Sexual Medicine, and the American Association of Sexuality Educators, Counselors and Therapists. She is based in South Carolina. Goodnight used to be a voice actress who worked for Section23 Films, most notably as Natsue Awayuki in Prétear. She also worked with Antarctic Press and Fred Perry on the animation of Gold Digger, in the role of Brittany Diggers. From 2004 to 2006, Goodnight was a music reviewer for Anime on DVD. She was the voice of Twilight Sparkle, the co-star, among other voices, in the My Little Pony/Doctor Who crossover radio program Doctor Whooves Adventures, which aired on YouTube.

== Personal life ==
Lauren has been a sex educator and equal rights advocate for over 20 years. While active, she was a regular at conventions, such as Anime Weekend Atlanta, Anime Boston, MetroCon, AnimeNEXT, and BronyCon. She frequently takes vacations to the United Kingdom, as she is an anglophile.

== Roles ==
- Angelic Layer – narrator
- Aquarian Age: Sign for Evolution – Arayashiki West, Sarashina
- D.N.Angel – Girl A (ep 21), Little Girl (ep 25)
- Neon Genesis Evangelion Director's Cut – additional voices
- Noir – additional voices
- Pretear – Natsue Awayuki
- RahXephon – additional voices
- Sorcerer Hunters OAV – Shiorena (ep 3)
- Super GALS! – various minor roles
- Gold Digger: Time Raft – Brittany Diggers
- Nana's Everyday Life – Nana
- Dr. Whooves Adventures – Twilight Sparkle (ongoing); Derpy Hooves ("Wrong Way Backwards", "DWA Short: Express Delivery: An April Fool's Day Sketch"); Rarity ("Number 12: Part One", "DWA Short: Fashionably Late", "Wrong Way Backwards", "DWA Short: Lovestruck"); The Professor (Alternative Universe Doctor) ("DWA Short: Crossed Wires", "Pony in a Box Extras: She's the Professor"); Celestia ("Shadows of the Lunar Republic")
- Dr. Whooves and Assistant – Twilight Sparkle (crossover episode "Wrong Way Backwards"); Herself (2013 April Fools Special "The Vampire Hazard")
- "Magic", by The Living Tombstone - Trixie (singing)
- 8-bit Sex – co-host
