= Antarctic Press =

American publishing company

- Founded: 1984; 42 years ago
- Founders: Ben Dunn and Mark Ripley
- Country of origin: United States
- Headquarters location: San Antonio, Texas
- Distribution: Diamond Book Distributors
- Key people: Joe Dunn, Brian Denham
- Publication types: Comics
- Fiction genres: Amerimanga, furry, funny animals, horror, science fiction, steampunk, political parody
- Imprints: Venus Comics (c. 1994–1998)
- Official website: Official website

Antarctic Press is a San Antonio-based comic book publishing company which publishes "Amerimanga" style comic books. The company also produces "how-to" and "you can" comics, instructing on areas of comic book creation and craft.

Beginning in 1985, Antarctic Press has published over 1500 titles with a total circulation of over 5 million. Befitting the company name, Antarctic's self-proclaimed mission is to "publish the coolest creator-owned comics on Earth". Co-founder Ben Dunn's brother Joe Dunn is the company's publisher.

Many now-established creators started their careers at Antarctic (with most continuing to publish with them), including Chris Bunting, Ben Dunn, Eisner-nominated Rod Espinosa, and Joseph Wight. Cartoonist Alex Robinson serialized his first comic book, Box Office Poison, with Antarctic in the 1990s.

== History ==
Antarctic Press was founded by Ben Dunn and Marc Ripley in late 1984 to publish the anthology Mangazine, one of North America's first publications of original English-language manga. Local San Antonio creators Fred Perry, Joseph Wight, and Rod Espinosa were early contributors to Mangazine; later all of them had their own Antarctic Press titles. Mangazine eventually ran for 120 issues in three volumes over a 20-year period.

Another early title was Extremely Silly Comics.

The company's first hit was Dunn's Amerimanga Ninja High School, which debuted as a limited series with Antarctic in 1987. Originally intended as a miniseries, the comic hit such a boom of popularity that it became a full series, currently totaling over 160 issues (as well as two miniseries, Ninja High School V2 and Quagmire USA, and the color limited series The Prom Formula).

Co-founder Ripley left the company in 1989 and Dunn brought on his brother Joeming ("Joe") Dunn to help manage the business.

Fred Perry's Gold Digger, which debuted in limited series form in 1992, is still being published by Antarctic Press.

In the 1990s, the company also published furry comics and erotic comics — from 1994 to 1998 the company operated an erotic imprint, Venus Comics.

In late 1996, however, looking to cut costs and focus more on more mainstream properties, Antarctic discontinued publishing all translated manga, anthropomorphic, and adults-only titles. As a result, two Antarctic Press employees, Elin Winkler-Suarez and Pat Duke, left the company to form Radio Comix. Furrlough and Genus, both long-running anthology titles, were taken over by Radio Comix.

Many of Antarctic's staple characters, from titles including Warrior Nun Areala, Ninja High School, Gold Digger, The Courageous Princess, and Dragons Arms, came together in the 2005 How to Break into Comics, which also featured their creators in the narrative.

In April 2006, the popular title Warrior Nun Areala was re-launched as Warrior Nun Lazarus and began to include computer coloring.

In 2007, David Hutchison's Final Girl limited series gave readers the choice as to which characters lived and which ones died.

In August 2016, the company began publication of Rochelle, from creator and writer John E. Crowther and artist Dell Barras.

In 2018 Antarctic more than doubled its monthly publishing schedule to 15 titles. It also branched into distribution, taking on the comics of the all-ages San Antonio small-press publisher Guardian Knight Comics.

In the spring of 2018 Antarctic announced it was publishing controversial creator and key figure of Comicsgate Richard C. Meyer's Jawbreakers: Lost Souls (crowdfunded on Indiegogo). After a backlash and threat of a retailer boycott, however, on May 11, Antarctic decided not to publish the title. Meyer filed a civil suit against fellow creator Mark Waid for "tortious interference with contract, defamation, and exemplary damages" for working to keep his book from being published by Antarctic; on December 23, 2020, the parties released a joint statement announcing that "Mr. Meyer has decided to voluntarily dismiss the lawsuit".

In 2019 they launched Exciting Comics and the start of their "Superverse".

== Titles ==
- 8-Bit Zombie by Fred Perry, a zombie-themed parody of/unofficial sequel to Wreck-It Ralph
- Albedo Anthropomorphics — taken over from Thoughts & Images; later taken over by Shanda Fantasy Arts
- American Woman
- Bad Kids Go to Hell
- Battle Girlz
- Box Office Poison (21 issues plus a special, October 1996 – October 2000)
- Chesty Sanchez
- The Courageous Princess
- Diesel, a loose adaptation of JoJo's Bizarre Adventure
- Dinowars
- Dragon Arms
- Extremely Silly Comics
- Exciting Comics
- Families of Altered Wars (includes Luftwaffe 1946)
- Fantastic Panic
- Far West
- Final Girl
- Freakier Than Normal
- Furrlough — taken over by Radio Comix
- Gold Digger — written and drawn by Fred Perry
- Hepcats (reprints plus one issue of original material)
- A History of Webcomics
- AP's How to Draw Manga
- King of Zombies, written and drawn by Joseph Wight
- Land of Oz: the Manga
- The Last Zombie
- Luftwaffe 1946
- Mangazine vol. 1 (5 issues, Aug. 1985–Dec. 1986)
- Mangazine vol. 2 (44 issues, Jan. 1989–May 1996)
- Mangazine vol. 3 (71 issues, July 1999–Nov. 2005)
- MetaDocs written by Joeming Dunn, MD, and illustrated by Rod Espinosa
- Mighty Tiny
- Nazi Zombies
- Neotopia
- Ninja High School
- Oz: the Manga
- Pirates versus Ninjas
- President Evil, a zombie parody comic featuring Barack Obama
- The Prince of Heroes
- PolyCombats (2020)
- Pose File
- Punchline
- Robotech
- Rochelle
- Sarah Palin vs. the World, a parody of Scott Pilgrim
- The Science Fair
- Sentai
- Shanda The Panda
- Shōjo
- Steampunk Palin, a sci-fi satire featuring Sarah Palin
- Stellar Losers
- Strangers in Paradise by Terry Moore — 3 issues (1993–1994); debuted with Antarctic before becoming self-published
- Strong Box the Big, Bad Book of Boon by H. Thomas Altman
- Tank Vixens
- Twilight X by Joseph Wight
- Twilight X Storm
- Wall Might, a Donald Trump-themed parody of My Hero Academia
- Warrior Nun Areala
- Weapons File
- Wild Life, a humorous slice-of-life anthology edited by Elin Winkler-Suarez which ran February 1993-April 1995 for twelve issues. It included Joe Rosales' Wildlifers and John Nunnemacher's Buffalo Wings.
- Winds of Winter
- Zetraman: Revival

=== Venus Comics titles ===
- The Barr Girls (1996) — by Donna Barr
- Battle Binder Plus (1995)
- Big Boob Bondage (1997)
- Bondage Fairies (1994)
- Cheeta Pop Scream Queen (1994)
- Deviant (1999) — by Robin Bougie
- Emblem (1994) — by Kei Taniguchi
- Genus (1994–1997) — long-running anthology; taken over by Radio Comix
- Melty Feeling (1996) — by Komashi Mamiya
- No-No UFO (1996)
- Nosferatu: The Death Mass (1997–1998) — by Holden Morris
- Vanity Angel (1994)

== Creators associated with Antarctic Press ==
- H. Thomas Altman
- Dell Barras
- Robby Bevard
- John E. Crowther
- Brian Denham
- Lee Duhig
- Ben Dunn
- Rod Espinosa
- Danny Fahs
- Ganbear
- Wes Hartman
- Ben Hunzeker
- David Hutchison
- Michel Lacombe
- Richard Moore
- Terry Moore
- Ted Nomura
- Fred Perry
- Gianluca Piredda
- Alex Robinson
- Jochen Weltjens
- Joseph Wight
- Elin Winkler-Suarez
