= The Courageous Princess =

Comic book by Rod Espinosa

Publication information
- Publisher: Antarctic Press (2000–2002); Dark Horse Comics (2007)
- Schedule: Erratic
- Format: Ongoing series
- Genre: Fantasy
- Publication date: 1998–2015
- Main character: Mabelrose

Creative team
- Created by: Rod Espinosa
- Written by: Rod Espinosa
- Artist: Rod Espinosa

The Courageous Princess is a comic book written and drawn by Rod Espinosa, published initially by Antarctic Press and then by Dark Horse Comics. The story consists of fairy tale lands, princes, and princesses.

== Publication history ==
The series was discontinued for several years after the second volume's release, but was eventually completed with the release of the third volume in 2015. That year Dark Horse Comics released a reprint of The Courageous Princess.

=== Books ===
- The Courageous Princess: Beyond the 100 Kingdoms (Upublish.com, 1998; Antarctic Press, 2000)
- The Courageous Princess: The Quest for Home (Antarctic Press, 2001)
- The Courageous Princess: The Kingdom of Leptia (Antarctic Press, 2002)

A masterpiece edition is also available, as well as a multitude of covers.

== Story ==
The story takes place in the Land of a Hundred Kingdoms. Princess Mabelrose lives in the small kingdom of New Tinsley, raised by her kind parents, King Jeryk and Queen Helena. Mabelrose, who isn't the fairest in the land, gets captured by an evil dragon and, lacking princes to rescue her, decides to escape on her own.

At the beginning of the story, Mabelrose is invited to a ball in the kingdom of Warwick. Unlike most fairy tales, when she arrives at the ball, the other princesses made fun of her uncouth, un-princess-like features, and her clothes, and the prince never even noticed her. She decides to make the ball more "entertaining" by letting loose a frog and causing chaos at the ball. Later, she tells her parents about the horrible experience that she has had at Warwick, and asks to be excused. She is then kidnapped by a fearsome dragon named Shalathrumnostrium, using his power of making her feel weak. His hobby is to kidnap princesses for their parents' gold.

Since there is no hope for a noble prince to rescue Mabelrose, and because her kingdom does not have the funds to pay the dragon's ransom, she decides to escape on her own. Shalathrumnostrium tells her all about the dangers that princes have to go through, and she uses this information (as well as his treasure trove) to get out of the castle herself.

When she is caught in a bush of magic thorns, she meets a talking porcupine named Spiky. He is one of the "anifolk", animals who can walk and talk like real humans.

Although Shalathrumnostrium keeps chasing her to bring her back to his castle, she escapes every time.

== Characters ==
=== Mabelrose ===
The main character of this story is Princess Mabelrose of New Tinsley. In the beginning of the series, she looks about 12 years old but as the series goes on, she grows and begins to look older, around 14 or 15. The best evidence of time passing is that her hair grows and she gets slightly taller. Mabelrose has light brown hair, and sienna-colored eyes. Her skin is a bit tanned. The tan comes from her father, King Jeryk. Mabelrose's skin is lighter than her father's because her mother's skin is lighter. Unlike any other princess of the kingdom, she has freckles and a rather un-princesslike way of holding herself. As the series goes on, her spunky attitude is muted, and she becomes much more mature. Shalathrumnostrium is always trying to track her down and bring her back to his castle, but she uses her quick wits and tomboyish skills to escape every time. When she is at the Kingdom of Leptia, Shalathrumnostrium attempts to settle things with her once and for all, but she discovers the true power of a magical flute, and destroys him. Mabelrose is very kind and caring, she makes friends easily and always helps those in need.

=== Spiky ===
Mabelrose's new best friend, a brown porcupine. Spiky met Mabelrose in Shalathrumnostrium's forest of thorns, near the end of the first book. Since then, they had been good friends. Spiky often helps Mabelrose when she is in trouble. There has been some speculation as to whether or not he is a prince disguised as a porcupine, but nothing has been confirmed. It is also unknown why Spiky was in Shalathrumnostrium's thorn bush in the first place.

=== Shalathrumnostrium ===
The very large, fearsome dragon. He is green, with glazed, silver eyes, although sometimes his pupils are shown as gray. Shalathrumnostrium lives in a large castle in the Unremembered Lands, which is very far away from New Tinsley. His hobby is to kidnap or "collect" princesses, and force the Kings and Queens to pay ransom in gold. When he first captures her, he claims that it is impossible for anybody to escape his fortress, or to enter and rescue Mabelrose. Shalathrumnostrium has an army of trolls and a wolf-like creature called "Mukhorgouroth". The trolls always fail to find Mabelrose and in the second book, Shalathrumnostrium crashes headlong into a cliff, killing Mukhorgouroth. This angers him, and when Mabelrose is at the Kingdom of Leptia in the third book, he attempts to settle things with her once and for all. Mabelrose finally ends up destroying him with his own fire by the power of a magical flute.

=== King Jeryk and Queen Helena ===
Mabelrose's kind and generous parents. For years, they had lived happily, but the element in their lives that was missing was a child. After a long time of praying, their dream came true, and Queen Helena birthed a daughter, Mabelrose. When Mabelrose is kidnapped, King Jeryk risks his life to find her, even though she is far in the Unremembered Lands. Helena always prays for him and for Mabelrose to come back alive and well. Jeryk has yet to find his daughter, or to find out that she has escaped on her own.

=== Rope ===
Mabelrose possesses a magical rope from Shalathrumnostrium's castle. She does not know that the rope is actually alive. Spiky regularly catches the rope moving, or helping them and has developed a sort of friendship with it, but Mabelrose refuses to believe him. She always says that it is "just a rope". Rope is fairly long, and has two green beads on either end that look like two pairs of eyes. The Rope has been helping Mabelrose and Spiky since Mabelrose first stole it from Shalathrumnostrium's treasure room.

=== Boar ===
Boar is a magical boar that is one of the "anifolk", a race of animals that can speak like human beings. His first appearance is when his leg is caught in a bear trap. He says that he has been stuck there for days. Mabelrose rescues him, despite losing one of her jewels. Boar knows right then that she was a princess, because she risked her wealth to save him. As a token of his appreciation, he gives her a bag of seeds, which came from a box on his jade collar. He also gives them to her because when the jade box glows, a "worthy one" is near. He then asks for Mabelrose to kiss him. She thinks that if she kisses him, he would turn into a prince. When she kissed him, nothing happened. Spiky ends up guffawing about Boar not really being a prince. Mabelrose asks why he asked her to kiss him, and he says that he wanted to know what it would be like to be kissed by a princess. This is an embarrassing moment for Mabelrose.

== Literary allusions ==
Several fairy tales and familiar stories are obviously alluded too, as Mablerose's parents are descended from literary characters: her Mother is the Great Great Great Great Granddaughter of Snow White and Prince Charming; her Father is supposedly descended from Aladdin.

Other stories alluded to include The Wizard of Oz, Princess and the Pea, The Pied Piper, The Three Billy Goats Gruff, and Rapunzel.
