= Twilight X =

Comic book series by Joseph Wight

Publication information
- Publisher: Pork Chop Press (1989–1990); Antarctic Press (1991–2007)
- Format: standard
- Publication date: 1989 – 2007
- Main character(s): Jed Saxon; Toots (Catherine Michelle Wolf); Richard Goldman; Melissa Duvall; Nigel Thomas

Creative team
- Created by: Joseph Wight

Twilight X is a post-apocalyptic war comic written and drawn by Joseph Wight, and published by Antarctic Press. The series was published in various limited series and one-shots from 1989 to 2007.

== Publication history ==
Starting in 1989, Twilight X was initially self-published by Wight, along with Neal Gleaton and Steve Kratochvil, under the short-lived Pork Chop Press imprint. At that point in its history, it was titled Twilight X: Caribbean Adventures. The title was picked up under Antarctic Press, first appearing in 1991 in their Mangazine collections. The seven-issue limited series Twilight X: War (2005–2006) was colored by GURU eFX.

=== Issues ===
- Twilight X: Caribbean Adventures (1989–1991)
- Twilight X: Interlude, 6 issues (1992–1993)
- Twilight X, 5 issues (June 1993–Oct. 1993)
- Twilight X Quarterly, 3 issues (1994–1995)
- Twilight X-tra, 3 issues (Dec. 1999–Feb. 2000)
- Twilight X, 2 issues ([Aug.] 2002–2007)
- Twilight X Pocket Manga, 4 issues (Apr. 2003–Apr. 2004)
- Twilight X: Storm, 8 issues (2003–2004) — collected in Twilight X: Storm Pocket Manga (Oct. 2004)
- Twilight X: War, 7 issues (2005–2006)
- Twilight X: War, 1 issue (2006)

== Major characters ==
Jed Saxon - United States Special Forces

The last of a specially assigned A-Team in Europe, Jed left the ruins of Italy and sailed across the Atlantic to return home. He landed on the island of Montserrat and right in the middle of an arms deal that went very sour. Before he knew it, he was wounded, running through the jungle with a suitcase full of nuclear arming codes. He happened upon a young girl named Toots and found not only a friend, but a person deserving of his protection and devotion.

Little is known about Saxon's past, or the purpose of his team. It is known that the team was known as the Zealots, as he still wears their shoulder patch. Admiral Belter of the United States Navy referenced the Zealots in connection with an 'Operation Ithaca', which may have been in connection with the mysterious group known as Elysium, which created the Neptune submarine.

He was married at one point to a woman named Michelle, who divorced him when he joined the military, and his remaining feelings for her have often gotten in the way of his growing feelings for Toots. He has a love for Ding-Dongs. Near the end of the War miniseries, he was caught in a grenade explosion and presumably killed. His death was confirmed in the field by Nigel Thomas, who attempted to carry his body back to Toots aboard the Sappho 3. His body is currently missing after being swept away by flood waters on the island of St. Maarten.

Toots

A bright, energetic girl who finds herself as a sort of trophy for an unsavory gunrunner named Vinnie. Her predicament is unexpectedly resolved when Jed kills Vinnie. She is immediately smitten with the young soldier's naive but profound sense of morality and his genuine kindness.

It is known that Toots's real name is Catherine Michelle Wolf, and she was born in 1983. During her life, she has followed numerous professions, including modeling and singing. She fancies herself to be a chef, but her cooking seems to rival that of Akane Tendo in toxicity.

Richard Goldman - Israeli Special Forces

Survivor of a doomed Israeli operation to the Caribbean, Richard shares Jed's conviction that the Nationalists must be stopped at all costs. Forced to escape an armada of Nationalist ships and planes, Richard is now aboard the submarine Neptune, a leftover engine of technology designed by Elysium.

Melissa Duvall - Genetic Engineer

A year prior to the story, Melissa escaped from Elysium, where her scientific skills had been exploited and perverted. She was captured by the Nationalists and eventually rescued by Jed and Richard. Until recently, she believed Elysium was no more, but the discovery of the submarine Neptune has made her suspect that the organization has survived. She has escaped the Nationalists again, along with Richard, aboard Neptune. She carries the secrets of Elysium.

Nigel Thomas - British Special Forces

When England was essentially destroyed, Nigel decided he'd had enough. He fled the war after serving with distinction in Iraq and Iran. He managed to buy his way aboard a cargo ship with treasure liberated from the Republican Guard of Iraq, then sailed to a small island between St. Lucia and Barbados. He believed he'd found the perfect place to live, but Jed and company brought the Nationalists down on his island paradise, and he was forced to flee with them.

== Organizations ==
- The White American Nationalist Klan
- Elysium
- Old United States Navy

== Vehicles of note ==
- Neptune
- Sappho 3
- Tottoro
