= List of Gold Digger characters =

The Gold Digger series has a large ensemble cast, in total spanning hundreds of characters.

== Diggers family ==
=== Gina Diggers ===
Archaeologist, super-scientist, adventurer, lover of all things Monty Python, Roddenberry and Lucas. After many years exploring the bizarre and inexplicable all over the earth and off it, she now teaches archaeology at a local university in her home in Atlanta, Georgia, preparing the next generation of adventurers. Her current project is Earth's Age of Wonders.

=== Britanny "Gia" Diggers ===
Gina's "baby sister" and Earth's last full-blooded were-cheetah. Adopted as an infant by Gina's father, Brit has accompanied Gina on most of her adventures as an assistant and bodyguard, even if (most times) she would rather have been exploring high-end clothing stores at the mall. Brittany has also settled down (some) to be a doting wife, loving mother, and kick-ass martial arts instructor.

=== Brianna Diggers ===
Part Gina, part Brittany, and all trouble. Brianna blends Gina's technical brilliance and Brit's physical prowess with an unsettling helping of weapons mania. Her innate, semi-instinctive talent for magic can be a mixed blessing, but it sure comes in handy when she runs out of ammo. Brianna has started to learn aura magic under her father, and helps to design equipment for her friends in the Vaultron Force on the side. She marries Zan after learning she is pregnant with his child.

=== Theodore Diggers ===
Gina's arch-mage father. Theodore adopted Brittany after he failed to stop the slaughter of the were-cheetah clan. While his attempts to teach his daughter Gina his own magic arts resulted in failure, he helped her start into her discovery of science and technology where she excelled. Since then, he has watched both his daughters grow up, though not without occasionally terrifying their potential boyfriends.

=== Julia Diggers ===
Gina's mother, and a master martial artist, but Julia was under a spell which made her unable to visit Earth, or interact with her family during most of Gina's childhood. Gina and Brianna eventually removed the curse, and since then she has re-earned her title of Armsmaster of Jade, as well as becoming a master of the Shun-Leep style of martial arts, starting her own school on Earth.

=== Stryyp'Gia ===
Brittany's husband, and the crown prince of the alien Kryn species, who arrived on Earth and founded El Dorado long ago. Due to a misunderstanding, El Dorado and Atlantis had been locked in a cold war for centuries. After an Atlantean sorcerer enslaved the inhabitants, Stryyp (also called Stripe, as his name sounds like stripe, and his pelt is striped) freed his people with the help of Gina and Brittany. He and Brittany have a daughter, Tiffany, and Stryyp himself works for Agency Zero, an undercover organization composed of former superheroes who now perform their good deeds discreetly and anonymously for better efficiency, and to make themselves into less of an open target.

=== Tiffany 'Gia ===
Tiffany inherited her mother's were-cheetah powers and new symbiots replicated from her father's. She also spent her early life being educated by a living world-computer, and has developed into a genuine prodigy. Though mature for her age, she is still very much a little girl. Her symbiots help her process information and protect her from harm. Her recently manifested were-cheetah abilities are likely to make her more powerful than her mother some day.

=== Peebos ===
Cute, goofy, childlike, self-aware, technomage bombs, without common sense, invented by Brianna Diggers by unconsciously combining golem magic with advanced artificial intelligence.

Brianna eventually adopted the three most advanced models as children. Peebri, Peegi, Peebrit, are each modeled after Brianna, Gina, and Brittany, respectively, so by raising them, Brianna can picture what it would have been like if she grew up with her sisters. As such they have a relatively free rein and are encouraged to learn for themselves, but unfortunately Peebri's antics are often destructive and/or silly, although highly amusing. The Peebos have starred in their own spin-off miniseries, where the less advanced series models occasionally guest star.

=== Zan ===
A wild man and Ebenezer Sleake's assistant. He entered a relationship with Brianna and married her after discovering she was pregnant with his child.

== Friends and allies ==
=== Penny Pincer ===
Gina's one-time rival and sometime partner, Penny is one of the few people who can go head-to-head with Gina on matters academic and archaeological. Both are equally intelligent, though with some different specialties. She's quite territorial over her relationship with Kevin "Ace" Koss, Gina's longtime friend and transport provider. She married Ace and is pregnant with his child.

=== Kevin "Ace" Koss ===
Gina's longtime friend, transport provider, and fellow adventurer, Ace is capable of piloting just about anything that flies. He is also a boyfriend/fiancé to Gina's ex-rival, Penny Pincer. He knows Penny is right for him, but had difficulty facing the commitment level of marriage, but they eventually wed.

=== Charlotte ===
A harpy, originally bioengineered as a mindless slave to the villainous Alfred Peachbody, Charlotte was quickly freed from his influence and adopted by Penny to train as her bodyguard. Penny has come to care for Charlotte as a surrogate mother, and her protege has advanced and proven herself several times over. Charlotte has progressed to an early teenager mentality, is constantly learning new advanced science at school, is best friends with Brittany's daughter Tiffany, and the two have many fun adventures together.

=== Seance ===
Theodore's apprentice and one of Gina's common adventuring partners. Seance can see the daydreams and mental visualizations of others and communicate and channel the spirits of the dead. Though he originally was interested in Gina, he eventually initiated a relationship with Genn.

=== Ryan Tabbot ===
Both a former rival and boyfriend of Gina Diggers, Ryan possesses photographic reflexes that allow him to duplicate the same moves of anyone he sees in action even once, resulting in his base fighting skills coming from Kung Fu movies. He put these skills to good effect, becoming a professional treasure hunter. While not on the level of Gina or her rival Penny in terms of archeology skills, his physical abilities allowed him to traverse dangerous tombs and other locations easily. As the rivals began finding more dangerous locations, Ryan and the Diggers sisters began to team up with increasing frequency, and Ryan and Britanny Diggers would often match up against less ethical rivals like Irwin 'Peewee' Talon and his team of enhanced bodyguards, Daishi, Zelda, and Ionis.

Additionally, Ryan's a professional mixed martial artist, practicing against some of the best fighters in the world on Team Jet, alongside fighters like Ayane Anno 'Mistress', one of his long-time friends, and more recently Jade-realm fighters Gar Silvear, Luan, and Carla, who he introduced to the fighting circuit.

=== Gennadrid ===
A half-djinni-half-rakshasa, and daughter of Madrid (although in practice a much less harmful form of succubus), Genn can mimic the form and abilities of anyone she has encountered, and originally used it for seduction purposes, as she needed to feed on ethereal energy to survive. She is one of Brianna's best friends, and a former lover, but grew attracted to Seance due to his high magical ether levels, and fell in love with his kind personality. As Seance is heterosexual, she removed her ability to assume male forms to accommodate him, and the two are currently married.

=== Madrid ===
Formerly the spoiled princess of the Djinni, Madrid once sought the power to grant her own wishes. To get it, she disguised herself as Gina and tried to kill off the real one. The disguise was too perfect; Madrid was now mortal and gradually came to resemble Gina more and more in body and mind. A traumatic experience caused what was left of Madrid's personality to give up and die, leaving only a copy of Gina's mind with Madrid's memories. Now she seeks to explore other worlds and work out her new life.

=== Ancient One ===
A Nomad Artificer who is a possible future version of Madrid, who was thrown into the distant past before the formation of the present universe. She has been manipulating events to save the universe from the threat that banished her into the past, and reunite with her family, the Diggers.

=== Dao ===
Madrid's fellow Djinn and ex-husband. Ever since Gina's group found his focus (an iron pot) and brought it home, he has put his natural intelligence and creativity to work as Gina's lab assistant. He has also become smitten with her, both physically and mentally, gradually assuming a form that blends elements of the men to whom Gina responds most positively. He and Madrid have reconciled and are dating.

=== Gar Silvear ===
A were-jaguar from the magical world of Jade, Gar apprenticed under Gina's mother, Julia when he was a young teen, becoming like a son to her. She even tried to hook him up with Gina's sister Brittany. When Julia became a Shun-Leep master, Gar left the Northern Edge-Guard to be her student on Earth, and he is her most advanced pupil. Gar retained some infatuation with Brit’ even after she married, but has slowly been developing a relationship with his fellow student Luan Geas. His full name is Garfield.

=== Sheila Silvear ===
A were-jaguar who is the younger sister of Gar and also a member of the Northern Edge-Guard. Sheila has a defect where all the size, power, and measurements commonly associated with the hybrid form are present in her human form, while her hybrid form is short and underdeveloped. This has led her to occasionally be mistaken for a child, which her tendency to refer to any kind of physical punishment as a 'kapowie' doesn't help with.

=== Luan Geas ===
A former ninja spy/assassin from Jade, whose parents were murdered by the undead knight Rook, Luan trained with her friend Carla at the Shun-Leep school, where they founded a fan club for its most famous graduate, Julia Diggers. Luan began falling in love with Gar when they had to work together to help Julia regain her title and honor. During that adventure, she and Carla were assigned to study under Julia on Earth. She is almost as skilled as Gar but has less control.

=== Carla Deltoya ===
Another Shun-Leep student from Jade, who is very baffled by the technological wonders that most take for granted, the prudish Carla is currently testing her skills in Earth's Universal Fighter Federation circuit alongside Ayane "Mistress" Anno, under the circuit alias of "Desire".

=== Vaultron Force ===
A group of five leprechauns, with code names based on the shapes seen in General Mills Lucky Charms cereal. They pilot cybernetic shoes, which together form the robot Vaultron. The squad is led by McKeith and Princess O'Lura, who designed the robots. O'Lura also designed Plasma Ballerina and Nemesis Shamrock, which can combine with Vaultron to form even more powerful 'giant' (to a leprechaun, anyway) robots; such as the full combination, Super King Kamehameha Vaultron. The Vaultron Force has clashed with the Uompa-Luompan prince Lowtor and his Snacktekons, his chocolate golem Dupity-Doom (a parody of the original Megatron), and even the Ninja-Pirate Leprechauns, and their Gaolion ship. The similarity of these names to Voltron, Keith, Princess Allura, and the Oompa-Loompas is undeniable.

=== Subtracto ===
Subtracto is a Nomad Artificer, a race of machine-intelligences predating the universe, although he seems to believe that he is a mere Artificer construct. Found in the Astral Rifts by Empress Lynn of Shangri-La, he befriended and helped her get back to Earth. After a reformed Madrid was rescued and brought to Shangri-La to recover, he befriended her as well, and now explores the Astral Rifts with her.

=== KIA ===
Kia is the artificial intelligence guiding a fortress-ship of the Dynasty of Stars, a race that terrorized much of the galaxy ages ago. Kia was left behind in quasi-space, the "ocean" between dimensions when the Dynasty departed there. After Kia befriended Gina and her sister Brit, he transported them back to Earth. He then settled into a parking orbit over the dark side of the Moon to sort things out.

=== D'Bra ===
D'Bra, or Debra as she is sometimes called, is the princess of the dragon race, and the daughter of Dreadwing. She is a member of Agency Zero.

== Enemies ==
=== Dreadwing ===
Gina's first and deadliest major foe, Dreadwing is an ancient and superhumanly intelligent iron dragon driven by calculating malice and ambition. To stop his conquest of time, Gina rigged his Time Raft artifact to explode, and he was blown into the time stream. Pulled back to Earth's ancient past by another of her enemies, Dreadwing embarked on the construction of a model of the Universe, with which he could manipulate reality and gain revenge.

=== Summoner ===
A living magic artifact, Summoner can create an infinite number of living spells which all share a mental link. For a time Summoner believed that she was a human supervillain (the 'multiple-woman' Array), during which time she fell in love with the hero-turned-villain, Tyrant. When her love was killed during a rescue gone bad, a grieving Summoner unleashed her full power to destroy the one who killed him, but she was subdued and left behind in a collapsing pocket dimension. Dreadwing commandeered her after everyone else left, and she currently serves as the lynch pin of his assembled forces. She is rather bitter about her current service, as Dreadwing shows her little respect, a fact that could come back to haunt him soon.

=== Rio ===
Patriarch of the Dynasty Of Stars, a family that turned against the rest of their kind (the peaceful Gardener race) over a horrible misunderstanding and resulting, equally horrible overreaction. He led a crusade that resulted in the virtual extinction of the rest of his species, as well as the conquest of most of the known universe until trickery caused the Dynasty to flee into Quasi-Space, billions of years ago. Rio is highly intelligent, immensely powerful, and experienced. He views 'lesser' species as fodder for the Soul Furnaces to make the armies of warrior-drones that serve his Dynasty, but species that possess a certain level of prowess can earn a sort of respect, though he will still enslave them. Stryyp's people, the Kryn, were one such species, whom Rio regarded as "the Heroes' Tribe".

=== Roxy "Dark Bird" Rabinowitz ===
The hardbitten leader of Night Flight, the world's premiere mercenary team. Dark Bird's hated Ace ever since he blithely proved himself a better pilot than her or any of her team, and routinely foiled both their missions and her attempts to bring him down. Dark Bird speaks with a distinctive New York accent (referring to herself as 'Dark Boid' for instance) and is a highly aggressive pilot, willing to go to rather petty lengths over a grudge such as the one she holds against Ace. She has led Night Flight from their aerial aircraft carriers, Gull Base (essentially a massive jumbo jet) and later, Gull Wing (similar to an even-larger-than-Gull-Base stealth fighter/bomber in shape), though she will also take to the skies in her own jet to lead from the front.

=== Skipper Von Richthofen ===
Chirpy and helpful, Skippy hardly seems like an air mercenary, but it apparently runs in the family. She has had a crush on Ace since she first saw him, and Dark Bird has convinced her that the only way to win Ace's heart is to beat him in air combat. Skippy may just have the skills to do it, too. She's a better pilot than Dark Bird, and at least Ace's equal.

=== Natasha Volstov ===
The Queen of the Vampires, Natasha rules most of the Realm of the Undead. Her first encounter with Gina involved unseating Gina's grandfather, then the Lich King, who had taken over Natasha's throne. Proud, selfish, and hedonistic, Natasha very much enjoys her power and position and sorely resents any threat to them.

=== Alfred Peachbody ===
A supersmart dog from an alternate future. He created Charlotte and attempted to sterilize Theodore and Julia in the past, but was foiled by Brianna. He eventually merged with Dreadwing.

=== Pirate-Ninja Leprechauns ===
- Captain McMorgan: The Leprechaun McMorgan was a Harward-educated idealist until he took the fall for a billion-dollar swindle pulled by the Leprechauns’ arch-enemy, Prince Lowtor. When he was exiled, the King's elder daughter, O’Mommah, went with him. They and a trio of disaffected ninjas formed a pirate band to earn back the lost gold and get vengeance on Lowtor. McMorgan captains the Gaollion, a four-mode robot designed by O’Mommah.
- O’Mommah: Elder daughter of the Leprechauns’ King Shamus, O’Mommah is a brilliant technomagical engineer. She frequently clashed with her father over freedom to create vs. the potential harm her creations might cause. Fond of her father's financial advisor, McMorgan, she abandoned her throne to go with him when he was framed for embezzlement and exiled. She became the first mate of his pirate-ninja crew.
- Platinus: Platinus is a magend, a living spell, unwittingly created by the living Enigma known as Summoner. Bonded to the dragon Fauntleroy, she is extremely powerful and loyal, but is also highly perverted, readily distracted by masculine physiques. Unknown to her master and his wives, Platinus developed full sentience. Were they to learn of this, she fears they would take it from her. As much as she adores her master, she will not sacrifice her soul for him.
- Lulubell: A former Hair Loss Fairy (easier work than a Tooth Fairy, but less pleasant and totally thankless), Lulubell was finally motivated to do more with her life when she hooked up with a musical mage named Spellvis. Her one big caper with him landed her a spell of singing Jailhouse Rock. She keeps hoping her spellcraft and knowledge of magical items will make him her hunka burnin’ love, but as far as Spellvis is concerned, she can take a walk down Lonely Street.
