= Ninja High School =

Comic book series

Publication information
- Publisher: Antarctic Press (1987–1988; 1994–current); Eternity Comics (1987; 1988–1993)
- Schedule: Erratic
- Format: Ongoing series
- Genre: Action/adventure, science fantasy, school
- Publication date: 1987–
- No. of issues: 178+ including issues #0 and #3 1/2
- Main characters: Jeremy Feeple; Asrial; Ichi-kun Ichihonei; Ricky Feeple; Professor Steamhead; Tomorrow Girl

Creative team
- Created by: Ben Dunn
- Written by: Ben Dunn, Katie Bair, Fred Perry
- Artist(s): Ben Dunn, Katie Bair, Robby Bevard, Carlos Castro, Fabian Doles

Collected editions
- Ninja High School Pocket Manga #1: ISBN 978-1932453089

Ninja High School (also known as NHS) is a comic book series created, written, and illustrated by Ben Dunn, published by Antarctic Press (at one point being published by Eternity Comics). On occasion other artists and writers have contributed to the series, including Katie Bair, Fred Perry, Robby Bevard, Carlos Castro, and Fabian Doles.

NHS takes place in a suburban town known as Quagmire, located "somewhere in the Midwest". The series originally centered on the misadventures of Jeremy Feeple, a 16-year-old boy attending Quagmire High School; an alien princess named Asrial from a planet called Salusia; and a young female ninja named Ichi-kun Ichihonei, from Japan. As the series progressed, more backstory was given to the main characters, and a large cast was created. Most of the cast are manga archetypes of varying degrees.

NHS started out as a limited series that mainly parodied famous anime and manga conventions. Rumiko Takahashi's Urusei Yatsura appears to be the main influence, although the title "Ninja High School" was commonly used in the 1980s to refer to Fujihiko Hosono's series Sasuga no Sarutobi, which was actually about a high school for ninja students. Later story arcs became more serious, delving into murder, drugs, and other more mature subjects.

After its initial four-issue run, the comic was popular enough to become a full series, currently totaling over 160 issues (as well as two limited series, Ninja High School V2 and Quagmire USA and the color limited series The Prom Formula). There were also two-issue furry parodies, Furry Ninja High School and Furry Ninja High School Strikes Back. Fan-contributed editions of the series include the Ninja High School Yearbook and Ninja High School Swimsuit Edition.

While not reaching great heights in critical or financial success, Ninja High School is one of few successful, long running manga-styled comics produced in the United States.

== Publication history ==
Ninja High School was initially published as a three issue miniseries by Dunn's own Antarctic Press in 1987, followed by an issue #4 in January 1988 described on the cover as "Now a regular series!" In 1988, Eternity Comics collected the miniseries, along with a new part four, into a "graphic novel" in preparation for the ongoing series. The ongoing series began bi-monthly with issue #5 in June 1988, running a total of 35 issues until issue #39 in August 1993. During the period Eternity was publishing the title, the company published several NHS limited series and spin-offs, including a Ninja High School: Special Edition (re-releasing the original mini-series with new art, reprinting "part four" of the graphic novel as issue #3.5, and reprinting issue #4), Ninja High School in Color (1992–1993), and a two-issue intercompany crossover with NOW Comics' Speed Racer in 1993. When Eternity shut down, Antarctic Press took over publication of NHS starting with an issue #0 in May 1994. Resuming the numbering with issue #40, Antarctic published 137 issues, ending with issue #175 in August 2009. Story continuity was "reset" three times, between issues #57 and #58, issues #74 and #75, and issues #129 and #130.

During this period, NHS crossed over with its fellow Antarctic Press title, Gold Digger; Antarctic has since published many associated one-shots and limited series.

Issue #74 (publication date April 2000) of the original series completed the Jeremy storylines, and in 1999–2000, Antarctic published a twelve-issue NHS Volume 2, focusing on Jeremy's younger brother, Ricky. Set four years after Ninja High School #74, Volume 2 reset continuity so that Ninja High School #1-74 took place in 1989, not 1986. NHS Volume 2, therefore (as well as all issues of NHS after issue #75+) took place in the 1990s.

From issue #101 to #126, the comic was written and drawn by Katie Bair (with assists from Robby Bevard), had a title change (shortened) to just "NHS", returned to black and white, and the setting changes to Hawaii. The only major character who carried over from the previous cast was Yumei Katana. This run was later collected into individual volumes under the new title, Ninja High School: Hawaii.

From #127 to #129, the comic was cooperatively developed by Fred Perry and Ben Dunn to transition from the Hawaii storyline back to the Quagmire location. The focus returned to the Volume 2 cast.

In #130, Ricky Feeple returns to the spotlight, in what, after the events of the second "Quagmire US" miniseries, may or may not be an alternate timeline. From here the version was dubbed Shidoshi by Antarctic Press to separate it from the original series. The Shidoshi series ran eight issues, and a new version of NHS was planned focusing on a new batch of characters.

== Plot ==
The story centers on Jeremy Feeple, an ordinary student at Quagmire High, living an ordinary life. Shortly into the story, a beautiful female ninja named Itchy Koo (real name Ichikun Ichinohei) and an alien princess named Asrial appear. The earlier stories focus on the girls' comedic attempts to marry this seemingly plain, ordinary high school boy.

The series plot started rather simply: Princess Asrial was sent to Earth to find Jeremy Feeple and marry him, an act that was described as required to ensure that their enemies do not lay claim to the planet. Since Earth was a non-aligned world, anyone could claim it, and the Salusians were desperate to keep it from being used against them. Ichi went to America to marry Jeremy as well, although her reasons for the trip were different, in order to become leader of her clan, her grandfather informed her that she had to marry the boy, the reason behind this is that Jeremy's mother was raised by this grandfather, and they wanted to be blood related.

Shortly after landing, Asrial, Ichi, and Jeremy Feeple get caught up in a whirlwind of comic mischief, fighting, and plots by local villains to take over the planet. The comic often features parody versions of other comics or television shows, usually Japanese, but occasionally European or American, such as Kamen Rider, Power Rangers, Ultraman, Harry Potter, Superman, The Powerpuff Girls, Terminator, RoboCop, Ninja Gaiden, Transformers, Fist of the North Star, and the Gundam series.

Later the series does a time skip and focus on Jeremy's little brother, Ricky Feeple (who was mostly a minor character in the first series), as he enters high school himself, gaining new friends and soon coming into conflict with a rival ninja clan known as Shidoshi who set their sights on destroying him. While the comic still retained its comedic tones, it also ventured into darker territory and has a bit more drama thrown in than the original NHS.

- The V2 spin-off has little to do with the actual storyline, although several main characters are used in the plot. It was created by Ben Dunn because it gave him the ability to tell stories he never got a chance to do with the original cast of characters. Furthermore, it allowed him to update the NHS timeline a bit.
- Between issues #75 to #100, the storyline departed from the main line and started focusing on Ricky Feeple and his temporal trips to alternate timelines on a bid to save the universe from being destroyed. In this time, Asrial had been seen to have left Earth for Salusia on important yet unknown business at that time. Eventually the universe is saved.
- Asrial's return to Earth following her trip came included with two children named Kassy and Lexus. Their age at introduction places them as at least 6 to 8 years old. As they are Salusian in appearance, Jeremy believes Asrial married someone else, but when they call Jeremy "daddy", Asrial admits to Jeremy he is their father. It is then assumed that the reason Asrial left was because Jeremy impregnated her and thought it safer to raise them on Salusia in a more stable environment. Likewise, this time gap could be explained by the temporal hopping Ricky did in his efforts to save the universe. This is the first time that the connection between Jeremy and Asrial has been confirmed as mutually romantic although there may be earlier evidence of this romantic and violent interest in earlier issues. A point ending the first run was when Ichi-Kun reveals her first pregnancy, which is in conjunction with Asrial's third pregnancy, but with a note saying the series would continue at a later date.
- Jeremy gets involved at least twice in Salusian affairs, one time by accident, in which he manages to uncover some secret plots to bring the Salusian Conglomerate to ruin.

== Main characters ==
To the left, the original main characters, Asrial, Jeremy, and Ichi-kun. To the right the current cast, centred around Ricky Feeple.

- Jeremy Feeple is a mild-mannered teenage boy attending Quagmire High School, generally described in the series as average in everything. Though he has not trained as extensively in the ninja arts as his younger brother Ricky, it is revealed later in the series that he does possess some stealth and infiltration skills. When Asrial shows up to marry him, mass mayhem ensues as another suitor and local events turn his world inside out. In the beginning, it was thought that Ichi would marry him, to the point that a character was seen in early issues who was from a future in which they did marry, but he eventually falls in love with Asrial and marries her instead, negating that reality. He is also the father of their three children. Despite being the star of the first series of adventures, Jeremy does not seem to follow in the footsteps of his mother Anna, and is instead among the more 'normal' members of the cast, though he is shown to be courageous and willing to fight for friends and loved ones.
- Ichi-kun Ichinohei is the granddaughter of the head of the Ichinohei clan. Ichi came to Quagmire due to a prearrangement with Anna Feeple a former member of the Ichinohei clan. Her goal was to have Jeremy marry her so that she could take over the clan, but she was soon caught up in the general Quagmire craziness. Ichi can be aggressive, though she is a very sweet girl. Ichi was always thought of to be the one who would marry Jeremy, but this did not come true. Ichi eventually married Rivalsan Lendo, and the two were last seen to be expecting their first child. Ichi, like Asrial, at one point was genuinely enamored with Jeremy, though she later came to love Lendo. Unlike Jeremy, Ichi-kun - who was also sometimes referred to as "Itchy koo" as a nickname by others in the cast - was fully competent in martial arts, as she was trained in ninjutsu by the Ichinohei clan, and often fought with Asrial over Jeremy as much as she did actual threats to the lives of all three characters during their time in the spotlight as the primary characters of the series.
- Asrial is a Salusian (race of humanoid skunks) princess hailing from the planet Salusia. In order to avoid detection on Earth, she was transformed by a scientist into a human girl with long blonde hair, though she retained her skunk-like ears atop her head. She has superhuman strength and great intelligence, although her attitude is the antithesis of Ichi-kun in that she is more reserved and less prone to headstrong decisions, likely due to her royal upbringing. She was ordered to marry Jeremy in order to cement an alliance between Salusia and Earth, which led to a rivalry with Ichi-kun. Her determination to marry Jeremy, however, was not solely on orders, but because she had genuinely fallen in love with him. Ultimately Asrial marries Jeremy, and gives birth to a set of boy-girl fraternal twins. She later gives birth to a third child, which is another daughter.
- Ricky Feeple is Jeremy's brother, who finds himself jealous of all the attention that Jeremy gets, among other issues. Ricky becomes one of the primary protagonists of the Shidoshi arc of Ninja High School, showcasing his martial arts talent, gained from training with his mother. He ends up married at the end of Shidoshi and he and his wife are currently expecting the birth of their first child.
- Yumei Katana is a ninja whose family married into the Rivalsans and along with Ricky one of the two rivals of Tetsuo Rivalsan, she eventually moved to Hawaii where she was beset by suiters, blind samurai, and the children of gods. Yumei serves as the protagonist of the Hawaii arc.
- Rivalsan Lendo is the head of the Rivalsan Ninja Corporation's US branch. Lendo has had a childhood crush on Ichi-kun, and had followed her to Quagmire when she moved from Japan. Lendo tried to foil Kudasai's prearrangement by kidnapping Jeremy. After his plan failed, Lendo tried to leave, but was stopped by his father. Thus, he was stuck in Quagmire until he could improve the profitability of its RNC branch. Rivalsan became a recurring character, fitting the rich but arrogant type. The name Lendo is basically a take on that of Shutaro Mendo from Urusei Yatsura.
- Anna Feeple is Jeremy Feeple's mother. She is a wizened woman who used to be a martial artist and heir to a dojo before she married Jeremy's father and settled down into retirement.
- Robert Feeple is Jeremy Feeple's father. He is an exterminator who was once hired by Ichi-kun's grandfather to rid the dojo of rats, which led to his chance meeting with Anna that ultimately resulted in their marriage. He is seen in two flashbacks, one where Anna explains that in order to leave the clan to marry, she had to promise Jeremy to the clan's first daughter, then with Jeremy at a very young age where he is explaining he must go off and kill many rodents, but will not be returning due to too many chemicals. Although this strongly suggested Mr. Feeple took his own life, it was later revealed that he is now living in a faraway kingdom, as in a later issue Jeremy is reunited with his father.
- Professor Johann Steamhead (Steamhein) is a German-born Jew who was expelled from his homeland in the early 1930s, just as he was beginning his science career. A devout scientist, Steamhein had a passion for harnessing the wonders of steam. His inventions were already known in the field of animal control when he came to America. He had made a friendship with Jeremy and Ricky's grandfather long before he became a teacher at Quagmire High School. Before leaving Germany, Professor Johann Steamheinn was a colleague of Professor Hossenfeffer. Due to a disagreement about something, they have not been on speaking terms ever since. Professor Steamhead is also the inventor of Zetranite, the substance that gives the Zetramen their powers.
- Heidi (Tomorrow Girl): Modeled after Supergirl, Tomorrow Girl is a superhero who makes several appearances. She is not an alien however, but instead a synthoid, a kind of artificial construct designed to resemble a human down to the cell structure. Originally, Heidi came from a future where an artificial intelligent race has enslaved mankind. She was sent to the present to bring back Jeremy, as his capture was crucial for the survival of that race. She and her adopted 'father' Tomorrow Man both defend the city of Quagmire. Heidi dated Ricky Feeple for a time during the early issues of Shidoshi, though their relationship did not last and various events throughout the arc kept them apart to the point that by the time they had encountered one another again, Ricky was married and had completed his ninja training.
- Arnie is an incredibly strong man. Early on, he defeated Lendo's bodyguard Kenterminator. Good friends with Jeremy and the gang, he was an older brother/guardian figure. He later was the leader of a group of teen heroes whom Ricky Feeple was a member of.
- Kaiju Akaru: Jeremy's rival for Ichi's affections (or so he would like to think) Akaru came from a small pacific island named Guri-guri. As a child he had received a letter in a bottle from a girl wishing for a friend—Ichi. When Akaru got older he left Guri-guri island and sought out to find Ichi with one goal: to make her his bride. Akaru arrived in Quagmire with his squid, Sigmund. He first ran into Asrial after picking fruit from her tree. After a quick encounter, Akaru was sent on his way with one of Asrial's fist. Later after meeting Ichi, Akaru decided to take her back by force. Ichi was saved by Asrial and Jeremy, but after disabling Asrial's Vette, it was then reduced to a fight between Jeremy and Akaru. Jeremy was definitely not in his best form, as Akaru was stronger and a much better fighter (tempered by his lifestyle in the wild). With the quick intervention of Asrial and a Salusian Power Drink (akin to steroids) the fight was quickly put to an end. Afterwards Akaru decided to stay and learn of this new place.
- Kalen: Asrial's older half-brother, Kalen was born from a union between King Jerka and an unknown lover. Kalen was a member of the ISC, but a falling out with his father led to a rift that has never quite been resolved. Kalen soon after became a pirate and recipe connoisseur. Kalen has always had a close relation to Asrial, and has constantly fought on the forces of good. Kalen's role in the intergalactic war between Zardon and Salusia was key in Salusia's victory as he had assisted in the escape of Asrial when captured by Zardonian Princess Leanna. Kalen was also selected by Asrial to watch over her daughter Kassy when it was deemed necessary for her safety. Currently Kalen's whereabouts are unknown, but he has added Solara to his crew.
- Kudasai Ichinohei is the head of the Ichinohei Clan from the beginning of the series. He appears short and vulnerable, but is able to reveal a stunningly buff physique by just taking off his shirt. In the spring of 1945 Kudasai Ichinohei crash landed somewhere in Russia. There he gained the trust of a young Russian woman named Tasha. Though their initial first encounter was a scare for the both of them. Tasha would help Kudasai gather the equipment to repair his plane so that he could leave, but some Russian soldiers tried to attack Tasha, and she was shot in the process. Tasha begged Kudasai to take her daughter Anna with him. Kudasai raised Anna along with his son. After Japan has surrendered on August 10, 1945, America occupied the country. A military officer named Jerome Feeple came to help during America's occupation by exterminating rats and bringing in food. Kudasai and Jerome became great friends. Soon the two began a small toy making company. Rivalsan Kenjo came along to help run the business, though a disagreement would cause him to leave and form the infamous R.N.C. As time passed Kudasai would reestablish his clan, leading the Ichinohei's to the forefront of ninja-dom.

== Collected editions ==
- Ninja High School TEXTBOOK volume 1 Class Reunion Edition: includes Ninja High School #1–3, 3 1/2, 4–23.

- softcover (ISBN 0-93065526-5/ISBN 978-0-93065526-6, 2014-12-02)

- Ninja High School TEXTBOOK volume 1: includes Ninja High School #0–4.

- digital (Antarctic Press/Cosplay Comics, 2015-08-03)

- Ninja High School TEXTBOOK volume 2/NHS: includes Ninja High School #24–43, Super NHS.

- softcover by Antarctic Press (ISBN 0-96635887-2/ISBN 978-0-96635887-2, 2003-02-23)
- Reunion Edition softcover by Antarctic Press (ISBN 0-93065546-X/ISBN 978-0-93065546-4, 2016-06-29)

- Ninja High School Textbook volume 2: includes Ninja High School #6–10.

- digital by Antarctic Press/Cosplay Comics

- Ninja High School TEXTBOOK volume 3: includes Ninja High School #11–15.

- digital (2015-08-03)

- Ninja High School TEXTBOOK volume 4: includes Ninja High School #17–21.

- digital (Antarctic Press/Cosplay Comics, 2015-08-04)

- Ninja High School Hawaii volume 1/Ninja High School Hawaii 1/NHS Hawaii 1

- Antarctic Press softcover (ISBN 0-97680431-X/ISBN 978-0-97680431-4, 2006-03-28)

- Ninja High School Hawaii volume 2/Ninja High School Hawaii 2

- Antarctic Press softcover (ISBN 0-97764243-7/ISBN 978-0-97764243-4, 2006-11-21)

- Ninja High School Hawaii volume 3/Ninja High School Hawaii 3

- Antarctic Press softcover (ISBN 0-97877250-4/ISBN 978-0-97877250-5, 2007-06-19)

- Ninja High School Hawaii volume 4/Ninja High School Hawaii 4

- Antarctic Press softcover (ISBN 0-97877257-1/ISBN 978-0-97877257-4, 2007-09-11)

- Ninja High School Hawaii volume 5/Ninja High School Hawaii 5

- Antarctic Press softcover (ISBN 0-97927231-9/ISBN 978-0-97927231-8, 2007-11-06)

- Ninja High School Indie Wars

- softcover (Antarctic Press, 2020-12-02)
- digital (Antarctic Press, 2020-12-03)

- Ninja High School: V.2 Edition 1/Ninja High School No. 1

- Antarctic Press digital (2014-03-08)

- Ninja High School: V.2 Edition 2/Ninja High School

- Antarctic Press digital (2014-03-09)

== In other media ==
At one point the rights to the comic book series were optioned by Perfect Circle Productions with the intention of it being developed into a feature film. The comic book was also adapted into a role-playing game by Battlefield Press.

== Reception ==
The work has been described as one of the first non-Japanese manga-like works, and an important work in the resurgence of children and young adult comic books in the West.
