= Dynamo Joe =

Comic book series

- Dynamo Joe #1 (May 1986), art by Doug Rice.

Publication information
- Publisher: First Comics
- Schedule: monthly
- Format: standard
- Publication date: May 1986–January 1988
- No. of issues: 15
- Main character(s): Elanian Daro; Pomru Purrwakkawakka

Creative team
- Created by: Doug Rice; John Ostrander
- Written by: John Ostrander; Phil Foglio
- Artist(s): Doug Rice; Ben Dunn

Dynamo Joe was an American science fiction comic book series published by First Comics from 1986 to 1988. Created, plotted and drawn by Doug Rice, it was scripted first by John Ostrander then by Phil Foglio. Ben Dunn sometimes filled in for Rice on the art.

The series is set in the future, involving a war in which three star-faring civilizations are being invaded by the alien and seemingly mindless Mellenares, huge green killing machines traveling in a straight line and destroying everything in their path. The brunt of the human defenses are giant, fusion-powered robots ("battle suits") called "Dynamo Class Robosoldiers" and crewed by living individuals. These battle suits can be configured for either planetary or space combat, and contain or use a wide variety of weaponry. Dynamo Joe focuses on the crew of one such suit: Imperium soldier Elanian Daro and Tavitan (humanoid feline) mechanic Pomru Purrwakkawakka, and their critical contributions to the war effort. Dynamo Joe ranged in tone from action-packed space opera to slapstick humor.

== Publication history ==
The series premiered as a back-up in the comic book series Mars, then ran as a staple for the five-issue run of the anthology First Adventures, before moving to its own series. The back-up shorts found in MARS comic issues #10-12 were reprinted (with additional pages added) in Dynamo Joe Special #1. Dynamo Joe was supposed to be a three-issue limited series, but ended up running for 15 issues, reaching a sort of resolution before cancellation. Rice was a fan of Japanese giant robot adventures, such as Robotech, and the battle suits were designed in that spirit.

== Characters ==
=== Elanian Daro ===
Elanian Daro was once a captain in the Imperium Officer Corp, and for some undisclosed reason was busted down to the rank of sergeant. It is known that the Magna Khan himself takes personal interest in Elanian Daro and considers him to be of great value. When busted out of the Imperium military, he was quickly snatched up by the Earth forces and attained the rank of Over Sergeant and placed in a command position. Elanian once held the temporary rank of general when the asteroid used for a command base was taken over by the "dreamers" that had been taken over by the Mellenares. Daro came to be a personal friend of the base commander, who apparently had more data on Daro than he himself did.

Daro had a sister who was consort to the Imperium prince that oversaw the Imperium fleet. She was killed when the prince attempted to overthrow the Magna Khan.

=== Pomru Purrwakkawakka ===
Pomru Purrwakkawakka was given great leniency in modifying the Dynamo Joe battlesuit and was known for pilfering objects and performing frequent modifications, despite the fact that he had clearance to nearly anything he wanted. He figured it was easier to ask forgiveness than permission—he also considered petty larceny to be part of the "fun" involved. Dynamo Joe was the most advanced robosoldier suit on the front line as a result of his ongoing upgrades, many of which were derived from observing/studying the extra-dimensional, sentient battlesuit "Wolf-1", which was operated by a mercenary from the pan-dimensional city of Cynosure.

== In-story information ==
=== Human culture ===
The Earth-based human culture was delineated by Earth-colonized worlds, held together by interstellar travel utilizing hyperspace, and the "Blood Nations", consisting of the Native American diaspora to the stars. The Blood Nations appeared to generally engage in constant warfare and piracy, while the colonized worlds reflected various ethnic settlements and were preyed upon by the Blood Nations.

Previous to the war with the Mellenares, the Earth military forces were engaged with anti-piracy operations against various Blood Nation factions. Upon contact with the planet eating Mellenares the Blood Nations reached an uneasy alliance with the Earth military forces and joined in combat against the mutual enemy.

=== Imperium culture ===
The Imperium is ruled by the Magna Khan, who left Earth with his harem in a starship for parts unknown in the 22nd century. The Magna Khan is immortal and uses his various princes and princesses to be his imperial government. As only the Magna Khan is immortal, it is the goal of each citizen to become so famous that the Magna Khan will remember his name, thus sharing in his immortality. Imperium subjects are commanded to be fit both mentally and physically - there are no fat or stupid Imperium citizens. Additionally, the Khan is involved in some sort of breeding/genetics program that appears to involve Elanian Daro, who happens to resemble the Magna Khan a great deal.

The Imperium is extremely advanced in technology and culture, focusing greatly on martial arts training. Imperium citizens are physically distinguished by their hair color (blue, green, white, etc.) and their eyebrows, which are forked as they approach the temple.

=== Tavitan culture ===
The Tavitans are a matriarchal society ruled by a "Great Mother". They are also known for some psychic ability as it was a vision by a Tavitan that foretold of the coming of the Mellenares. Young Tavitans are known to be excitable and seek adventure, and it was not unusual for them to go out into the world/galaxy and sow their wild oats before settling down into married life.

Tavitans place great trust in their instincts and are natural mechanics, engineers, and tinkerers, if not great soldiers. The younger they are, the less reliable, patient, and disciplined they tend to be.

The Tavitan Homeworld, Londree, orbits (ironically enough) the "Dog Star", Sirius, in a system of planets also threatened by the Mellenares advance. As a species, the Tavitans are nocturnal, so the culture works "the night-shift", which is something off-worlders who visit Londree find difficult to adjust to.

Apart from being superb engineers (even in null-gravity), other Tavitans in the Alliance have been given duties in Intelligence and Research & Development. Their codes are impenetrable, and they always think "outside-the-box" when designing new hardware. Pvt. Pomru is part of a small contingent of male Tavitans actually part of integrated forward combat units, like the members of the "Lafayette Escadrille" of World War I on Earth.
