= Rod Espinosa =

Filipino comics creator, writer, and illustrator

- Born: Philippines
- Areas: Writer, Artist
- Notable works: Neotopia

Rod Espinosa is a Filipino comics creator, writer, and illustrator.

== Biography ==
Espinosa's work on The Courageous Princess at Antarctic Press earned him a nomination for Promising New Talent and Best Artist for the 2000 Ignatz Awards and a 2002 Eisner Award nomination for Best Title for Younger Readers.

His past work include the Battle Girlz series, a manga novel adaptation of Alice in Wonderland, The Alamo, Dinowars and Metadocs. He has also written and conceptualized popular Antarctic Press titles such as I Hunt Monsters and Herc and Thor.

=== Humanitarian work ===
In 2008, Espinosa won an international contest sponsored by the United Nations and the World Health Organization entitled Stop Tuberculosis. The Stop TB comic book educating people about how to avoid Tuberculosis featured soccer star Luís Figo as the spokesman.

In 2009, Espinosa joined 60 other Filipino artists from all over the world and contributed to the tribute book Renaissance: Ang Muling Pagsilang, the sales of which were donated to the victims of typhoon Ondoy.

== Bibliography ==
- The Courageous Princess
- Neotopia (Antarctic Press)
- Battle Girlz
- The Alamo
- Dinowars
- Metadocs
- I Hunt Monsters (Antarctic Press)
- Herc and Thor (Antarctic Press)
- Graphic Biographies series (ABDO, A Family of Educational Publisher):
  - George Washington
  - Benjamin Franklin
  - Patrick Henry
  - Sacagewea
  - Jackie Robinson
- Graphic History series (ABDO, A Family of Educational Publisher):
  - Boston Tea Party
  - American Revolution
  - Lewis and Clark
  - The Underground Railroad
  - The Transcontinental Railroad
- Graphic Adventures: the Human Body series (ABDO, A Family of Educational Publisher):
  - The Brain
  - The Lungs
  - The Eye
  - The Liver
  - The Kidneys
  - The Heart
- U.S. Presidents Biographies series (ABDO, A Family of Educational Publisher):
  - John Adams
  - Thomas Jefferson
  - Ulysses S. Grant
  - Barack Obama
- Historical Animals series (ABDO)
  - Dolly the Cloned Sheep
  - Bud the Traveling Dog
- comic book adaptations of literacy classics (ABDO)
  - Around the World in Eighty Days
  - Moby-Dick
  - Phantom of the Opera
  - Journey to the Center of the Earth
  - Dracula (Adapted by Dan Conner)
  - William Shakespeare's Romeo and Juliet, Midsummer Night’s Dream (Adapted by Dan Conner), As You Like It, Comedy of Errors, Much Ado About Nothing, and Winter's Tale
- Graphic Classics series (Eureka Productions):
  - William Shakespeare's Cymbeline
  - Edgar Allan Poe's "The Raven" and "The Cask of Amontillado"
  - The Wendigo
  - Jack Finney's The Body Snatchers
- Super Roommates
- Evil Diva
- Courageous Princess — writer and artist
- Alice in Wonderland Manga (Dark Horse Comics) — adaptation and art
- A Christmas Carol (Dark Horse Comics) — adaptation and art

Steampunk Fairy Tale series

- Steampunk Snow White (Antarctic Press Comics) — adaptation and art
- Steampunk Snow Queen (Antarctic Press Comics) — adaptation and art
- Steampunk Cinderella (Antarctic Press Comics) — adaptation and art
- Steampunk Red Riding Hood (Antarctic Press Comics) — adaptation and art
- Steampunk Little Match Girl (Antarctic Press Comics) — adaptation and art
- Steampunk Goldilocks (Antarctic Press Comics) — adaptation and art

Immortal Wings series

- Issue 1, January 2016 (Antarctic Press Comics) -art
- Issue 2, February 2016 (Antarctic Press Comics) - art
- Issue 3, March 2016, (Antarctic Press Comics) - art
- Issue 4, April 2016, ( Antarctic Press Comics) - art

Adventure Finders

- Issue 1, September 2017 (Antarctic Press Comics) -story and art
- Issue 2, October 2017 (Antarctic Press Comics) -story and art
