= Ben Dunn =

American comic book artist and publisher (born 1964)

- Born: April 17, 1964 (age 62) Taiwan
- Areas: Writer, Artist, Publisher
- Notable works: Antarctic Press; Ninja High School; Warrior Nun Areala; Marvel Mangaverse
- Awards: Inkpot Award (2016)

Ben Dunn (born April 17, 1964) is an American comic book artist and publisher.

== Biography ==
Dunn was born in Taiwan, and grew up in Taiwan, Kentucky, and San Antonio, Texas, where he graduated from Central Catholic Marianist High School. It was in Taiwan that he was first exposed to Japanese manga.

In 1984 he co-founded Antarctic Press, an American comic book company specializing in manga-style (Amerimanga) titles. His most notable creations for Antarctic are the comic book series Ninja High School and Warrior Nun Areala.

In 2003, Dunn sold his portion of Antarctic Press to start his own development company, Sentai Studios. After a couple of years he closed Sentai and returned to Antarctic.

Dunn was one of the primary artists involved in the short-lived Marvel Mangaverse project. He also worked as an animator for the science-fiction film A Scanner Darkly.

In 2016, Art Greenhaw began creating, editing and writing faith-based visual novels and comic books, starting with the book series God's Silver Soldiers, also known as Silver Soldiers: The Comic and followed by Tales of Nazareth: The Boyhood of Jesus. The comic books, under the imprint of Truthmonger Comics Group Publishing, have achieved acclaim for their action-oriented innovation in illustrations by Dunn, as well as their storylines, and they have been covered in the media by TV channels, newspapers, and faith-based, nationally syndicated radio.

In 2019, Dunn created the Coalition of Independent Comic Publishers.

== Personal life ==
Dunn lives in the Dallas–Fort Worth metroplex with his wife and two children.

== Bibliography ==
Comics work includes:

- 1986–2007, 2017=? Ninja High School (Eternity Comics, Antarctic Press)

- 2017 (#176) (self-published?)
- 2017-? (2017 series, #177-?) (Antarctic Press)
- 2016?-2017? Ninja High School Textbook (self-published?)

- 1987 Dynamo Joe (First Comics)—fill-in art
- 1987–1988 Swords of Texas (Eclipse Comics)
- 1989 Messerschmitt (2017 release at Hen House via Pinterest)
- 1989–1990 Mighty Tiny (Antarctic)
- 1988 "Tiger-X" (Eternity Comics)
- 1990 "Tiger-X: The Adventure Continues!" (Eternity Comics)
- 1989–1991 Captain Harlock (Eternity)
- 1994–2005 Warrior Nun Areala (Antarctic)
- 1997 Robotech (Antarctic)
- 1998-2016? Valhalla

- 1988 series
- 2016-? (2016 series) (Hen House via Pinterest)

- 2002 Marvel Mangaverse (Marvel Comics)
- 2003 The Agents (Image Comics)
- 2004 How to Draw Manga (Antarctic)
- 2004–2005 Heaven Sent (Antarctic)
- 2011 How to Draw Steampunk (Antarctic)
- 2016-? Stellar Losers (Patreon Secret Site via Pinterest)
- 2016-? Silver Cross (Patreon Secret Site via Pinterest)
- 2017 Game of Geeks (self-published via Patreon)
- 2017 God's Silver Soldiers (a.k.a. Silver Soldiers: The Comic) (Nordskog Publishing)—backup stories: Tales of Nazareth: The Boyhood of Jesus
- 2023 Tomorrow Girl (Antarctic Press)
