= Gold Digger (comics) =

Comic book series

- Gina Diggers and Dreadwing

Publication information
- Publisher: Antarctic Press
- Schedule: (vol 1); Bimonthly (vol 2); 9 times a year (roughly) (vol 3); 11 times a year (roughly)
- Format: (vol 1); Limited series (vol 2 & 3); Ongoing series
- Genre: Action/adventure
- Publication date: (vol 1); Fall 1992 – Spring 1993 (vol 2); Summer 1993 – Summer 1999 (vol 3); Summer 1999 — Autumn 2023
- No. of issues: (vol 1); 4 (vol 2); 50, 4 Annuals, 1 Gold Digger -18 Special, 1 Gold Digger Beta (vol 3); 251, 17 Annuals, 12 Xmas Specials, 4 Holidays Specials, 14 Halloween Specials, 26 Swimsuit Specials, 2 Swimsuit/Annual, 4 Peebo Tales, 1 Women of Gold Digger, 4 Gold Digger Tangent, 1 Gina vs. Penny, 1 Summer Fun Special, 4 Throne of Shadows, 4 Maidens of Twilight, 1 Spellvis Return of the King special, 22 Official Handbooks, 3 Books of Magic, Gina Digger: Warnerd of Mars
- Main character(s): Gina Babette Diggers, Brittany Diggers

Creative team
- Created by: Fred Perry
- Colorist: Wes Hartman

Gold Digger is a comic book series, written and drawn by Fred Perry, and published by Antarctic Press. Counting all the regular series issues, in addition to all the connected limited series, annuals, special issues, and handbooks produced by the author, Gold Digger is the most extensive, long-running, self-contained North American comic book in history that has been consistently written and drawn by the original creator.

The artwork and design of Gold Digger are strongly influenced by Japanese manga, and Perry himself describes the book as a mixture of Indiana Jones and Final Fantasy.

== Publication history ==
Perry came up with the initial inspiration for Gold Digger during his tour of duty in the First Gulf War, and released the debut one-shot in Antarctic Press' Mangazine in 1991. A four-issue limited series followed in 1992 and 1993, followed by a regular monthly black-and-white series, and finally the current color series beginning in 1999.

In 2011, Perry discussed being inspired by the way the contemporary Doctor Who television series develops story arcs, and he adapted Gold Digger to a similar consistently self-contained format from issue #101 and onwards, with each issue easily accessible and possible to enjoy for new readers.

== Summary ==
Gold Digger focuses on the adventures of Gina Babette Diggers, polymath superscientist, teacher and adventurer, accompanied by her family, friends, students, and acquaintances, as she explores the strange and ancient hidden histories of the world, spanning a wide distinctive variety of characters, stories, environments, worlds, societies, times, species, and universes of magic and science fiction, in a world filled with possibilities.

== Plot influences ==
Thanks to the author's very diverse interests, and personal experiences ranging from the U.S. Marine Corps to physics studies, the stories have included tongue-in-cheek references to a wide variety of popular culture, spanning anything from science, fantasy, science-fiction, television series, books, superheroes, computer games, animation, manga, or even internet memes.

== Characters ==
See: List of Gold Digger characters

== Collected editions ==
- Gold Digger Pocket Manga, vol. 1 – Collects the original miniseries issues #1–4. – ISBN 1-932453-00-8
- Gold Digger Pocket Manga, vol. 2 – Collects the first issues of the Gold Digger regular series. – ISBN 1-932453-07-5
- Gold Digger Pocket Manga, vol. 3 – ISBN 1-932453-35-0
- Gold Digger Pocket Manga, vol. 4 – ISBN 1-932453-61-X
- Gold Digger Pocket Manga, vol. 5 – Collects vol. 2 #17–21. – ISBN 1-932453-71-7
- Gold Digger Pocket Manga, vol. 6
- Gold Digger Pocket Manga, vol. 7 – ISBN 1-932453-94-6
- Gold Digger Pocket Manga, vol. 8 – Collects vol. 2 #32–35 plus Ninja High School #54–57. – ISBN 0-9768043-0-1
- Gold Digger Pocket Manga, vol. 9 – Collects vol. 2 #36–40.
- Gold Digger Pocket Manga, vol. 10 – Collects vol. 2 #41–45. – ISBN 0-9728978-7-9
- Gold Digger Pocket Manga, vol. 11 – Collects vol. 2 #46–50.
- Gold Digger Max Pocket Manga – Collects the Asrial vs. Cheetah and A Science Affair miniseries, plus the Gold Digger Beta and GD Minus 18 one-shots. – ISBN 0-9776424-1-0
- Gold Digger II Pocket Manga, vol. 1 – Collects issues #1–8 of the colour series. – ISBN 0-9787725-3-9
- Gold Digger II Pocket Manga, vol. 2 – Collects vol. 3 #9–15. – ISBN 0-9792723-0-0
- Gold Digger II Pocket Manga, vol. 3 – Collects vol. 3 #16–21. – ISBN 0-9797719-0-0
- Gold Digger II Pocket Manga, vol. 4 – Collects vol. 3 #23–30. – ISBN 0-9797719-7-8
- Gold Digger II Pocket Manga, vol. 5 – Collects vol. 3 #31–36. – ISBN 0-9801255-3-7
- Gold Digger II Pocket Manga, vol. 6 – Collects vol. 3 #37–42. – ISBN 0-9816647-9-2
- Gold Digger II Pocket Manga, vol. 7 – Collects vol. 3 #43–47. – ISBN 0-9816647-1-7
- Gold Digger II Pocket Manga, vol. 8 – Collects vol. 3 #48–52. – ISBN 0-9822253-9-3
- Gold Digger II Pocket Manga, vol. 9 – Collects vol. 3 #52–56. – ISBN 0-9841107-2-0
- Gold Digger II Pocket Manga, vol. 10 – Collects vol. 3 #57–61. – ISBN 0-9841107-7-1
- Gold Brick, vol. I – Collects vol. 2 #1–25
- Gold Brick, vol. II – Collects vol. 2 #25–50
- Gold Brick, vol. III – Collects vol. 3 #1–25 (51–75 overall) – ISBN 978-0930655150
- Gold Brick, vol. IV – Collects vol. 3 #26–50 (76–100 overall) – ISBN 978-0930655211
- Gold Brick, vol. V – Collects vol. 3 #51–75 (101–125 overall) – ISBN 978-0984337552
- Gold Brick, vol. VI – Collects vol. 3 #76–100 (126–150 overall) – ISBN 978-0983182320
- Gold Brick, vol. VII – Collects vol. 3 #101–125 (151–175 overall) – ISBN 978-0972897839
- Gold Brick, vol. VIII – Collects vol. 3 #126–149 & 200 (176–200 overall) – ISBN 978-0930655488
- Gold Brick, vol. IX – Collects vol. 3 #201–225 – ISBN 978-0930655532
- Gold Brick, vol. X – Collects vol. 3 #226–250 – ISBN 978-0930655921
- Gold Brick, vol. XI – Collects vol. 3 #251–275 – ISBN 978-1955929172
- Gold Brick, vol. XII – Collects vol. 3 #276–301 – ISBN 978-1955929271
- Gold Digger FREDeral Reserve Brick – ISBN 978-0930655730
- Gold Digger Platinum, vol. 1 – Collects vol. 3 #101–105. Starring Gina and her new batch of supernatural archeology students. – ISBN 0-9843375-7-1
- Gold Digger Platinum, vol. 2 – Collects vol. 3 #106–110.
- Peebo Manga Vol. 1 – Starring Brianna, Peebri, and the Peebos.
- Peebo Tales TPB – Collects "Gold Digger: Peebo Tales #1–6".
- Tifanny & Charlotte Pocket Manga – Collects the first miniseries.
- Tifanny & Charlotte, 2nd Semester Pocket Manga – Collects the second miniseries.
- Throne of Shadows Pocket Manga – Collects "Throne of Shadows" #1–4, starring the wererats.
- Maidens of Twilight Pocket Manga – Starring Gennadrid and Seance.
- Gold Digger Tangent Pocket Manga – Starring Ayane and the Northern Edge Guard.
- Gold Digger Sourcebook TPB – Collects the Gold Digger Sourcebook #1–17.
- Gold Digger Tech Manual – Collects Gold Digger Tech Manual #1–9

=== DVDs ===
- GD-ROM 1.0 – Collects Gold Digger vol.1: #1–4, vol.2: #1–50, vol.3: #1–75, and Ninja High School #54–57.
- GD-ROM 2.0 – Collects Gold Digger vol.1: #1–4, vol.2: #1–50, vol.3: #1–100, and Ninja High School #54–57.
- GD-ROM 3.0 – Collects Gold Digger vol.1: #1–4, vol.2: #1–50, vol.3: #1–125, and Ninja High School #54–57.
- Gold Digger: Time Raft – A full length OVA movie.

== Awards ==
In 2013, Perry received an Inkpot Award for his work on the series.
