= List of anthropomorphic comics =

This is a list of comic books, comic strips, and webcomics that feature anthropomorphic animals.

== Comic books ==
=== Anthology series ===
- Albedo Anthropomorphics (including Erma Felna: EDF)
- Critters
- Furrlough
- Tales from the Aniverse

=== Comedy series ===
- African Office Worker

=== Contemporary drama ===
- Blacksad
- Elephantmen
- Exit, Stage Left!: The Snagglepuss Chronicles
- Fish Police
- Grandville
- Inspector Canardo
- Nordguard
- Omaha the Cat Dancer

=== Fantasy adventure ===
- Anima: Age of the Robots
- Cerebus the Aardvark
- Katmandu
- Usagi Yojimbo

=== Superhero ===
- Army Surplus Komikz, featuring Cutey Bunny
- Atomic Mouse - Shanda Fantasy Arts revival
- Bucky O'Hare
- Buster the Amazing Bear
- Fission Chicken
- Super Dinosaur
- Teenage Mutant Ninja Turtles

=== Manga ===
- Beast Complex
- Beastars
- BNA: Brand New Animal
- Cat Shit One
- Odd Taxi

== Comic strips and webcomics ==
- Anima: Age of the Robots
- Arne Anka
- Digger
- Fritz the Cat
- The Great Catsby
- I Will Survive
- Inherit the Earth
- Kevin and Kell
- Lackadaisy
- The Ongoing Adventures of Rocket Llama
- Ozy and Millie
- Pearls Before Swine
- Rocky
- Sabrina Online
- T.H.E. Fox
- Twokinds
- XDragoon
- ZooPhobia
