= Legendary Lives Referee's Rulebook =

Tabletop role-playing game

Cover art by Kathleen Williams, 1990

Legendary Lives Referee's Rulebook is one of the two books published by Marquee Press in 1990 required for the role-playing game Legendary Lives.

== Contents ==
Legendary Lives is a medieval fantasy role-playing game largely based upon various types of faeries and other supernatural creatures from northern Europe mythology. Legendary Lives Referee's Rulebook is a supplement which details the mechanics of the game, such as skills, monsters, and combat rules. Stewart Wieck stated that it "elaborates on the game system, contains more complete skill descriptions, has foe (monster) descriptions, explains combat, details the properties of a variety of plants, lists magic items ... and presents a short introductory adventure". The other book required for play is the Player's Primer.

== Publication history ==
In 1990 Marquee Press published two books written by Joe Williams and Kathleen Williams that together form the Legendary Lives role-playing game: The Player's Primer and the Referee's Rulebook. Referee's Rulebook is a 98-page softcover book with art by Kathleen Williams.

The two "core" rulebooks were followed in 1991 by the 72-page Legendary Lives Societies Sourcebook, which details the social structure of the various faerie types.

Marquee Press published a revised second edition of Legendary Lives in 1993 that combines the Player's Primer and the Referee's Rulebook into one 272-page softcover book, with additional material by Dmitri Ashling.

Joe and Kathleen Williams would use much the same game rules from Legendary Lives to produce the supernatural role-playing game Lost Souls in 1992.

== Reception ==
Stewart Wieck reviewed the product in the August/September 1990 issue of White Wolf Magazine. He advised that it "contains several excellent tips for GMs".

In the July 1993 edition of Dragon (Issue #195), Lester W. Smith defined both the Legendary Lives Player's Primer and the Referee's Rulebook as "amateur appearance but impressive content." He pointed out that "The Legendary Lives game constitutes a fresh look at role-playing, reflecting a fantasy world that, while it is strongly rooted in European legend, differs considerably from the normal gaming approach to those legends, and having game mechanics that are far different from the norm." Smith concluded with a strong recommendation, saying, "Overall, the strengths of the Legendary Lives game far outweigh any weaknesses. Because its PC creation system is so entertaining, and its play is so fast in general, it makes a great 'change-of-pace' game. Also, the world it presents is an engaging one [...], capable of handling a wide range of adventure types and standing up to sustained play."

In 2002, Legendary Lives was one of a dozen role-playing games termed by Ron Edwards as "fantasy heartbreakers", which are as Shannon Appelcline explains, "fantasy RPG games that were designed by people who seemed to know nothing about the advancement of game design since the original productions of Dungeons & Dragons".
