= Jason Holmgren =

American artist and role-playing game designer

Jason Holmgren is an American cartoonist, art director, and role-playing game designer.

== Career ==
Holmgren first started as a cartoonist for Shadis Magazine, where his strip, Joe Genero: Adventures of the Average Man, debuted in 1990. The comic focused on the conceits of popular role-playing games, which all defined "average" in different ways. He later wrote and illustrated The New Adventures of Fineous Fingers for the same magazine, under license from J.D. Webster.

Holmgren is responsible for several cover illustrations for the early issues of Jolly Blackburn's popular Knights of the Dinner Table, and contributed to the design of the character Sara . His artwork has been featured in Dork Tower. Holmgren was head artist for Sheep on the Borderlands, a 2002 Origins Award nominee.

In 1998, Holmgren co-founded Sanguine Productions, and a year later produced Ironclaw: Anthropomorphic Fantasy Role-Play. Despite the 2000 release of the third edition of Dungeons & Dragons and the subsequent marketplace dominance of the d20 System, the Ironclaw game found a small but solid core audience. Holmgren served as head designer and art director on later Sanguine projects, including Jadeclaw, Albedo: Platinum Catalyst, and Usagi Yojimbo. He was nominated for an Ursa Major Award for Albedo: Platinum Catalyst in 2004.

Holmgren lives in Cincinnati, Ohio, United States.
