= Legendary Lives Player's Primer =

Tabletop role-playing game supplement

Cover art by Wayne Henke, 1990

Legendary Lives Player's Primer is the first of two books published by Marquee Press in 1990 required for the role-playing game Legendary Lives.

== Contents ==
Legendary Lives is a medieval fantasy role-playing game largely based upon various types of faeries and other supernatural creatures from northern Europe mythology. Legendary Lives Player's Primer has all of the rules that players need to know for the Legendary Lives role-playing game: player character generation rules, with 26 character races to choose from, 12 spellcasters, other classes, and a Lifeline system to allow players to generate background history for their characters. The book also includes an introductory adventure. The other book required for play is the Referee's Rulebook.

== Gameplay ==
=== Character generation ===
The player first chooses one of 26 different races: Avian, Barbarian, Brownie, Bush Person, Corsair, Draconian, Dwarf, Oriental, Elf, Elfin, Entomolian, Bestial, Firbolg, Forester, Goblin, Gypsy, Hill People, Hob, Netherman, Nomad, Ratling, Serpent, Sidhe, Spriggan, Viking, and Wolfling.

After choosing an occupation for the character, the player then rolls a six-sided dice for each of the character's 12 abilities (Agility, Vigilance, Charm, Cunning, Dexterity, Destiny, Intelligence, Knowledge, Mechanics, Nature, Endurance, and Strength), adding a bonus to each score according to the race chosen.

=== Skill resolution ===
To see if an action is successful, the gamemaster first assigns the result that is needed to achieve success, which, from worst to best, are Catastrophic, Pathetic, Feeble, Inferior, Poor, Passable, Good, Great, Superior, and Awesome. The player then rolls percentile die, and cross-references the result against their relevant specialty or skill score on an Action Results Table (ART). If the player equals or exceeds the difficulty level set by the gamemaster, the character succeeds at their task.

=== Combat ===
Combat resolution uses the same ART, with ranges for combat simplified into only three categories: "melee", "thrown missile", and "too far away."

=== Campaign setting ===
The game is set in a medieval fantasy alternate world called "Le Monde".

== Publication history ==
In 1990 Marquee Press published two books written by Joe Williams and Kathleen Williams that together form the Legendary Lives role-playing game: Legendary Lives Player's Primer and the Referee's Rulebook. Legendary Lives Player's Primer is a 96-page softcover book with interior art by Wayne Henke, Kathleen Williams and Erik Weiber, and cover art by Wayne Henke.

The two "core" rulebooks were followed in 1991 by the 72-page Legendary Lives Societies Sourcebook, which details the social structure of the various faerie types.

Marquee Press published a revised second edition of Legendary Lives in 1993 that combines the Player's Primer and the Referee's Rulebook into one 272-page softcover book, with additional material by Dmitri Ashling.

Joe and Kathleen Williams would use much the same game rules from Legendary Lives to produce the supernatural role-playing game Lost Souls in 1992.

== Reception ==
Stewart Wieck reviewed the product in the August/September 1990 issue of White Wolf Magazine, and noted the game's "excellent game mechanics and fine character generation system" while downplaying its magic system. Wieck concluded with a strong recommendation, saying "Legendary Lives is probably one of the five best fantasy game systems available" at the time, and gave it an overall rating of 4 out of a possible 5.

In the July 1993 edition of Dragon (Issue #195), Lester W. Smith defined both the Legendary Lives Player's Primer and the Referee's Rulebook as "amateur appearance but impressive content." He pointed out that "The Legendary Lives game constitutes a fresh look at role-playing, reflecting a fantasy world that, while it is strongly rooted in European legend, differs considerably from the normal gaming approach to those legends, and having game mechanics that are far different from the norm." For instance, Smith thought the ART system of skill resolution "stresses quick play and storytelling over realism." However, Smith noted some problems, namely that opponents were "wimpy", and that the introductory adventure was "less than clear and overly linear (leading the PCs about 'by the nose')." He also noted that "some people are sure to find the game’s magic system less than satisfactory." But Smith concluded with a strong recommendation, saying, "Overall, the strengths of the Legendary Lives game far outweigh any weaknesses. Because its PC creation system is so entertaining, and its play is so fast in general, it makes a great 'change-of-pace' game. Also, the world it presents is an engaging one [...], capable of handling a wide range of adventure types and standing up to sustained play."

In 2002, Legendary Lives was one of a dozen role-playing games termed by Ron Edwards as "fantasy heartbreakers", which are as Shannon Appelcline explains, "fantasy RPG games that were designed by people who seemed to know nothing about the advancement of game design since the original productions of Dungeons & Dragons".
