= Hahlmabrea =

- Publisher: Sutton Hoo Games
- Publication date: 1991

Hahlmabrea is a 1991 role-playing game published by Sutton Hoo Games.

== Contents ==
Hahlmabrea is a game in which a swords and sorcery civilization is based on the early Dorian Greeks, Mesopotamians, and Egyptians.

== Publication history ==
Shannon Appelcline noted that Dan Fox had designed a game originally called "Warriors, Witches and Wizards" and he came to Lion Rampant in 1989 looking for a publisher for his game in exchange for funding printers and computers for the struggling company and having it move to what he purported was his home in Georgia, but the company never published the game after the actual owner of the house evicted them; Hahlmabrea was ultimately self-published in 1991 by Sutton Hoo Games. Ron Edwards identified Hahlmabrea as one of the "fantasy heartbreakers", or fantasy role-playing games designed without using any advancements in game design since Dungeons & Dragons was originally published. This was the first role-playing game publication from Sutton Hoo.

== Reception ==
H. Paul Haigh reviewed Hahlmabrea in White Wolf #29 (Oct./Nov., 1991), rating it a 4 out of 5 and stated that "If you desire a good, self-supporting, easy-to-use, yet flexible game system that you can twist and mold, tour the land of Hahl."

== Reviews ==
- Polyhedron (Issue 81 - Vol. 14, No. 3)
- Shadis #10
