= Albedo (disambiguation) =

Albedo is a measure of reflectivity.

Albedo may also refer to:

== Arts and entertainment ==
=== Fictional characters ===
- Albedo (Ben 10), a character in the multimedia franchise Ben 10
- Albedo, a character in the video game Genshin Impact
- Albedo, a character from the light novel and anime series Overlord
  - Albedo, an eponymous character in the anime series Isekai Quartet
- Albedo, a character in the video game series Xenosaga

=== Other uses in arts and entertainment ===
- Albedo 0.39, a 1976 album by Greek artist Vangelis
- Albedo Anthropomorphics, a comic book anthology
  - Albedo (role-playing game), derived from the comics
- Albedo One, an Irish horror, fantasy, and science fiction magazine (1993–2023)

== Other uses ==
- Albedo (alchemy), a stage of alchemical progression
- Albedo, the mesocarp of a fruit
- The base color of an object in Physically based rendering
