= Usagi Yojimbo Role-Playing Game =

2005 tabletop role-playing game

Usagi Yojimbo (2005)
Role-Playing Game
- Cover art by Stan Sakai
- Designers: Jason Holmgren; Pieter van Hiel; Edwin Wendell Dean; Kevin Frane; Amanda Geyer; Van Pigtain; Fred Stanton
- Illustrators: Jason Holmgren; Stan Sakai; Ken Singshow; Conrad Wong
- Publishers: Sanguine Productions
- Publication: 2005
- Genres: Anthropomorphic historical manga

Usagi Yojimbo Role-Playing Game is a fantasy/historical role-playing game (RPG) published by Sanguine Games in 2005 that is based on the Stan Sakai comic-book series Usagi Yojimbo. Sanguine produced a second edition of this RPG in 2019, but ceased publication when the license to the Usagi Yojimbo property expired in 2022.

== Description ==
Usagi Yojimbo is set in 17th-century Japan and features anthropomorphic animals as characters. The game uses a modified variant of the systems used in some other Sanguine RPGs: Ironclaw, Jadeclaw, and Albedo: Platinum Catalyst.

The 200-page book has the following chapters:

1. History: A short history of Japan from the 8th century CE to the beginning of the Tokugawa shogunate era where Usagi Yojimbo is set.
2. Background: Japanese society, central government, powers of regional daimyos, law, social classes, religion and philosophy.
3. Gazetteer: Each region of feudal Japan, including main cities, and notable features.
4. Selected Cast of Characters
5. Character creation
6. Races: Overview of the animal races available to players.
7. Careers: Sixteen careers divided into five categories (warriors, common people, criminals, ninja, and priests).
8. Basic Rules
9. Combat Rules
10. Recovery
11. Character Growth
12. Spot Rules: Movement, encumbrance, material damage, etc.
13. Weapons

Five appendices provide: three scenario synopses; variant rules; variant races; variant careers, and a summary of Bushido, the Warrior's Way.

=== Character generation ===
The player creates a player character by:

- Determining values for the four character attributes (Body, Speed, Mind, and Will) either by choosing the values or by random die rolls;
- Deciding on a race for the character, which determines racial gifts;
- Choosing a career, and receiving corresponding gifts;
- Choosing skills and allocating a pool of points between them;
- Choosing three additional gifts;
- Deciding on name, description and biography;
- Choosing weapons;
- Determining combat characteristics.

=== Action resolution ===
To determine the success of an action, the player rolls a number of dice determined by the difficulty of the action, the character's Career level, the level of the relevant skill being used, and any bonuses. If any of the dice rolled exceeds the success threshold, the action succeeds.

== Publication history ==
In 1984, cartoonist Stan Sakai created the comic book series Usagi Yojimbo, which rapidly gained a following. In 1997, Gold Rush Games created Usagi Yojimbo Roleplaying Game, which used a variant of the Fuzion role-playing game system.

In 2005, Sanguine Productions acquired the role-playing game license for Usagi Yojimbo, and published Usagi Yojimbo Role-Playing Game, a completely new game using a modified Sanguine game system. The 200-page softcover book was created by Jason Holmgren, Pieter van Hiel, Edwin Wendell Dean, Kevin Frane, Amanda Geyer, Van Pigtain, and Fred Stanton, with cover art by Stan Sakai, and interior art by Sakai, Holmgren, Ken Singshow and Conrad Wong.

The following year, Sanguine also published a Spanish-language version.

In 2019, Sanguine successfully used Kickstarter to raise enough funds to publish a second edition using the Apocalypse World game system. However, in 2022 Sanguine allowed the license to expire on the Usagi Yojimbo property, and ceased publication.

== Reception ==
Writing for The Daily Apocalypse, Jason D'Angelo didn't like the "cumbersone" chapters on the history, and culture of Japan, calling them "a huge information-dump without connection to rules, mechanics or gameplay." D'Angelo also disagreed with the rules around healing, pointing out the absurdity of some of them and suggesting, "follow your original guiding star and make your game follow not the limits of physical healing but the nature of stories told in the Usagi comics." However, D'Angelo admired the dice mechanics, calling them the best part of this game. D'Angelo concluded, "This is definitely my favorite version of the game, even for its shortcomings. To play it, you just have to do what GMs have been doing since the hobby began; use your own energy and skill to make the game interesting and meaningful outside of combat."
