= Milieu 0 =

Milieu 0 is a 1996 role-playing game supplement published by Imperium Games for Traveller.

== Contents ==
Milieu 0 is a supplement in which the first of varied campaign settings across time is introduced, collectively referred to as "Milieus." This inaugural volume details the birth and early expansion of the Third Imperium. Spread across eight chapters, it explores planetary integration, political structures, and provides referee guidance for running campaigns in this foundational era. Each chapter contains potential adventure hooks and scenario concepts.

== Publication history ==
Shannon Appelcline noted that, "Milieu 0 (1996) fully revealed something that had been hinted at before; despite the inclusion of a 'classic era' 1105 adventure in the T4 rulebook, the new game was actually set in a totally new time period for Traveller; the era of the Third Imperium's founding. Again, this was something that Miller had promised in his initial letter but it also served to further alienate old players. After ten years of Rebellions and computer viruses, fans were hoping to get their old Imperium back and instead they were given yet another setting."

== Reception ==
Andy Butcher reviewed Milieu 0 and First Survey for Arcane magazine, rating it a 6 out of 10 overall, and stated that "So, while Milieu 0 and First Survey clearly do the job they were intended to do, it has to be said that they don't do it as well or as completely as you might have hoped, especially in the light of the delays in their release. These two books are not a bad start to the Milieu series, but unfortunately they're not the best, either."

== Reviews ==
- Shadis #37 (1997)
- AAB Proceedings (Issue 36)
