= The Iron Claw =

The Iron Claw or Iron Claw may refer to:

- The Iron Claw (1916 serial), an American silent adventure film serial
- The Iron Claw (1941 serial), an American crime film serial
- The Iron Claw (film), a 2023 British-American biographical sports drama film
- Iron claw, an alternative name for the professional wrestling hold clawhold
- Iron Claw (band), a Scottish heavy metal band
- Ironclaw, a 1999 fantasy tabletop role-playing game

== See also ==
- The Iron Clew, a 1947 mystery novel by Phoebe Atwood Taylor
