= Fission Chicken =

Comic character

- Fission Chicken has problems with the TV. Art by J.P. Morgan.
- Author(s): J.P. Morgan
- Website: http://www.fissionchicken.com
- Current status/schedule: Weekly
- Launch date: 1987 (online April 16, 2006)
- Genre(s): Superhero, Anthropomorphic Parody

Fission Chicken is a comic book and webcomic character created by John Patrick (J.P.) Morgan (1957–2010). Fission Chicken is a short-tempered superhero chicken with the ability to fly, possesses supernatural strength, bulletproof durability, and can project power bolts from his hands.

Starting in 1987, Fission Chicken appeared in numerous stories published in the comic book Critters, published by Fantagraphics Books, as well as his own 4-issue series from the same publisher. This was originally intended to be an 8-issue series, with a fifth cover having been already prepared, but was ended due to low sales.

Other appearances over the years include Plan Nine from Vortox (MU Press), as well as in Furrlough (Radio Comix), Valiant Varmints and SFA Spotlight #14 (Shanda Fantasy Arts). Varmints was a 1998 anthology comic in which Fission Chicken teamed up with other creators' anthropomorphic characters. Many of these were associated with the furry fandom, such as Beatrix Farmer, created by Steve Gallacci and Taral Wayne.

Pages by J.P. Morgan can also be read on the Fission Chicken website.

Fission Chicken ("Fish" for short) fights a continuing battle against weird monsters and cultural brain death. Notably, he has battled the mind control attempts of Vortoxians (a malevolent race of alien marketing experts), the Ditsy entertainment empire (a parody of The Walt Disney Company), and Video Zombies. Some unusual opponents he has fought include the Ether Bunny (a rabbit bank-robber who uses airborne incapacitating agents on his victims), Percival Ulmer "P.U." Evolcraft (a somewhat deranged occultist and a satire on H. P. Lovecraft), ambulatory living toilets, the movie monster Ferdie Cruller (a pun on Freddy Krueger), the Dero (a subterranean race), an army of incompetent and dull-witted invaders from the planet "Ineptune", and his own evil duplicate. Other characters in the series include Monica Fether (his beautiful girlfriend—who can also fire energy bolts), Skip Squirrelhard (his P.I. friend, who aspires to be a children's book author), Dr. Lawrence Livergut and Crouton (a scientist and his assistant who often inadvertently create extra problems for our hero), and Norman Gnu (AKA Normannu the Gnostic Gnu, a free-spirited mystic who travels through time).

Unlike most superhero characters, Fission Chicken does not use an alias to hide his identity, and simply goes by the name "Fission Chicken". Several episodes reveal that his base of operations is an apartment in an unnamed city in New Jersey (creator J.P. Morgan was a resident of Keansburg, NJ), and his friend Skip Squirrelhard is his upstairs neighbor.

"Fission Chicken" creator John Patrick Morgan died December 30, 2010, at the age of 53. His final online strip, the conclusion of a story arc, had appeared on Christmas Eve that year.

== Characters ==
- Fission Chicken (Critters #15, August 1987)
- Fuzzy Cutekins (Critters #15, August 1987): Hated by Fission Chicken, a celebrity who makes a living from vapid and bottomless cuteness.
- Boogog (Critters #15, August 1987): A giant spider monster bent on eating Fission Chicken and Fuzzy Cutekins.
- Vortoxians (Critters #19, December 1987): Evil marketing geniuses from space, the PlanetCorp Vortox. They have made themselves into plastic robots in order to better conquer other worlds.
- Lomax Lizard (Critters #19, December 1987): An acquaintance of Fission Chicken who attempts to convince him to monetize himself through toys, comic books, and cartoons, all of which Fission Chicken rejects violently.
- Destructo Dog (Critters #19, December 1987): A B-List superhero who is targeted for Lomax Lizard's cash grabs after Lizard was rejected by Fission Chicken.
- Skip Squirrelhard (Critters #19, December 1987): Fission Chicken's upstairs neighbor, private investigator and aspiring children's book author. Frequently assists in fighting evil, mainly the Vortoxians.
- Selmor-99 (Critters #20, January 1988)
- Kikbak-72 (Critters #21, February 1988)
- P.U. Evolcraft (Critters #23, April 1988)
- Dr. Frankenstang (Critters #27 August 1988)
- "Strep" O'Coccus (Critters #27 August 1988)
- Walt Ditsy (parody of Walt Disney) (Critters #28 September 1988)
- Steven Spielbird (parody of Steven Spielberg) (Critters #30 November 1988)
- Michael Jukeson (parody of Michael Jackson) (Critters #30 November 1988)
- Dickey Mouse (Critters #30 November 1988)
- Dr. Livergurt (Critters #32 January 1989)
- Crouton (Critters #32 January 1989)
- Nuke Rooster (Critters #32 January 1989)
- The Dero (Critters #35 April 1989)
- Ayn Rant (parody of Ayn Rand) (Critters #35 April 1989)
- Livergut Labs Toilet (Critters #38 July 1989)
- Middle-Aged Generic Mutant Tortoises (Critters #39 July 1989)
- Ether Bunny (Fission Chicken #1)
- Nathrax, Lepsyro, and Flatucelen (Fission Chicken #1)
- K'CelBoo (Fission Chicken #1)
- Stu Dinerdud (Fission Chicken #2)
- Ferdie Cruller (Fission Chicken #2)
- Russ Cavern (Fission Chicken #2)
- Vid-Citizens (Fission Chicken #4)
- President Kingoff (Fission Chicken #4)
- Cyber-Republicans (Fission Chicken #4)
