= Albedo (role-playing game) =

Tabletop role-playing game

- Cover of the boxed set, art by Steve Gallacci
- Designers: Craig Hilton, Paul Kidd (1988 & 1993 editions); Pieter van Hiel, Jason Holmgren (2004 edition)
- Illustrators: Steve Gallacci
- Publishers: Thoughts & Images, Chessex, Sanguine Productions
- Publication: 1988 (Thoughts & Images); 1995 (Chessex); 2004 (Sanguine Productions)
- Genres: Science Fiction, Furry
- Systems: Custom

Albedo is a role-playing game based on Steve Gallacci's Erma Felna: EDF and Birthright storylines from the comic anthologies Albedo Anthropomorphics and Critters.

== Play style and mechanics ==
Albedo is a science-fiction space-adventure system based on the "Erma Felna, EDF" comics stories. All of the player characters are genetically constructed anthropomorphized animals, and are typically members of the "Extra-Planetary Defense Force". The rules use a single chart to determine the results of all skill and characteristic checks. A task system dictates how these results are modified. In combat, wounds directly affect character abilities.

Albedo: Platinum Catalyst is characterized by the notable player-controlled troupe of characters, the main character and four supporting retinue. The main character is more fleshed out than his supporting characters which typically have 3 stats (species, morale, job description) and a weapon.

Morale is a character's ability to keep cool; when a character is shot or witnesses an explosion, they lose one point of this stat. Green soldiers will typically start with one morale point if they trust their commanding officer, and can have 3 morale points after completing three missions with the main character. For main characters, the equivalent to morale is drive.

In Albedo, higher skill gets you a larger sided die. Skill rank 1 gives you the smallest: 1d4, 2 points gives you 1d6 all the way up to rank 5 giving you 1d12. That's not all though, you can decide to take a test in one of several manners: Basic, Pushing, Risking, Breezing, and Rote.

Rote is the "take 10" of Albedo, where you get your skill ranks + 1. This is business as usual. Basic is for those things that you fail sometimes, but need higher than a 2 on the die. Pushing is doing things better. The unusual circumstances where you need to succeed. You grab twice as many dice as you normally would, roll them and take the better (Pushing is the one of two ways to Overwhelmingly Succeed: simply, both dice meet or beat the target). Risking is for those times when you need to reach beyond your normal capacity because regular dice aren't enough and only necessary if you have 4 ranks or fewer. Simply grab the next size die and take your chances. Breezing is the last method, where the character is overqualified for the job at hand and wants to outperform. This is similar to Pushing, only in it you take the sized die of half your skill ranks and roll twice as many (the second way to overwhelmingly succeed, and the reason why you buy over 5 ranks in a skill).

== Publication history ==
The Albedo Role Playing Game was written by Paul Kidd with Steve Gallacci and first published as a boxed set with four books - three rulebooks (background and characters, technology and equipment, referee's manual) and an introductory scenario - and dice by Furball Publications (Aus.) in 1988, and was then published as a boxed set with four books by Thoughts and Images in 1988.

Written by Craig Hilton and Paul Kidd, Albedo was originally published as a box set in 1988 by Thoughts & Images and consisted of 4 books: Player's Manual, Equipment Description, Referee's Manual and Tlakatan Scenario (sample scenario). The RPG was later revised and published by Chessex in 1993 as a softcover. There is one companion sourcebook and a pair of ready-made scenarios, also in softcover:

- Albedo Ship Sourcebook (Kidd, Gallacci - Chessex, 1995), rules for ship design and statistics for various spaceships.
- The Drift (Kidd - Chessex, 1994), an adventure scenario in space.
- Zho-Chaka (Kidd - Chessex, 1994), an adventure scenario on a ConFed planet.

There also exists a third-party guide to converting Albedo for use with the GURPS RPG system, written by Fred M. Sloniker and called GURPS Albedo.

In 2004, Sanguine Productions published ALBEDO: PLATINUM CATALYST, which is unrelated to the original two editions of the role-playing game. The game was published as a single softcover with source material, rules of engagement, and sample characters. Most notable are its attention to details of small-unit tactics using near-future and far-future weaponry, in the same vein as Tom Clancy's Rainbow Six and other "techno thrillers", as well as using genetically-engineered people as a morality play for 20th century geopolitics.

== Reception ==
Lawrence Schick called the game "An example of the subgenre we can only call 'Pets in Space'" and noted that the Extra-Planetary Defense Force is "dedicated to peace-keeping rather than butt-kicking."

In Issue 11 of Gateways, Elizabeth Bieler commented, "The illustrations are, of course, lovely, marred only occasionally by a poor reproduction." Bieler also thought this was "an excellent sourcebook of the world." However, Bieler felt the product was unfinished, pointing out, "if you are looking for a complete RPG, this is not the place. The 'task difficulty' method of action resolution is vague, and leaves the gamemaster the task of independently judging the difficulty rating of every movement, every action, every attempt to do something." Bieler also noticed that the character generation process made strictly average characters, and the skill list was very brief. Despite this, Bieler concluded, "I would encourage fans of Albedo [comic books] or of furry animal tales in general to run out and get a copy of the entire game."

In his 1990 book The Complete Guide to Role-Playing Games, game critic Rick Swan pointed out, "Albedo attempts to stress interpersonal relationships among the characters instead of combat encounters, and though that's an admirable goal, the game mechanics don't quite pull it off. Instead of ideas to encourage role-playing, the game substitutes formulas, numbers, and charts." Swan thought "The rest of the rules are equally clunky." However, Swan liked the background material, calling it "superb. The history, culture, and technology of the game world is richly detailed and always fascinating." Swan concluded by rating this game 3 out of 4, saying, ""As a sourcebook of interesting ideas, Albedo is first rate. But as a game, it needs some work."

== Other reviews and commentary ==
- Knights of the Dinner Table Magazine #127 (May, 2007)

== See also ==
- Ars Magica
- Ironclaw
