= First Survey =

Science-fiction role-playing game supplement

- Cover art by Chris Foss
- Designers: Duane Maxwell; Steve Miller; David Wise
- Publishers: Imperium Games
- Publication: 1996; 29 years ago
- Genres: Science fiction
- Systems: 2D6

First Survey is 1996 supplement published under license by Imperium Games for Marc Miller's Traveller, the fourth edition of Game Designers Workshop's science fiction role-playing game Traveller.

== Publication history ==
First Survey is a 112-page softcover book designed by Duane Maxwell, Steve Miller, and David Wise, with illustrations by Steve Bryant and Bryan Gibson, and cover art by Chris Foss. The book has two computer-generated lists — one for the gamemaster, and the other for the players — that contain data on over 10,000 planets in the Traveller universe. The data included each planet's name, its location, type of government, level of law, and its terrain type.

Due to a programming error, the data on type of government and law level was incorrect.

== Reception ==
Andy Butcher reviewed Milieu 0 and First Survey for Arcane magazine, rating it a 4 out of 10 overall, and stated that "So, while Milieu 0 and First Survey clearly do the job they were intended to do, it has to be said that they don't do it as well or as completely as you might have hoped, especially in the light of the delays in their release. These two books are not a bad start to the Milieu series, but unfortunately they're not the best, either."

In the January 1998 edition of Dragon (Issue #243), Rick Swan was not impressed with the supplied data on each planet, calling it "sparse to the point of non-existence." He conceded that the sparseness was intentional, so that gamemasters could fill in the details for their own Traveller campaigns. But Swan objected to the entire concept of the book, pointing out the relatively high cost of the book ($23 in 1998), and saying "any experienced gamemaster ought to be able to cook up a perfectly adequate list of planets all by his lonesome." He concluded by giving the book a very poor rating of only 2 stars out of 6.

In his 2014 book Designers & Dragons, Shannon Appelcline commented that "First Survey (1996), the final book copyrighted 1996, was probably the worst (and ugliest) book published for the game system. It contained 112 pages of computer-generated statistics for all the worlds of the Imperium in Milieu 0, laid out in unattractive row after row. There were two copies of all the stats: one for players, and one for the gamemaster, making the book that much more redundant. Worse, due to an error in programming, every single planet's Universal World Profile (UWP) was wrong. The fifth and sixth digits of each UWP — which represented the government and law level of the planet — were all identical."

== Reviews ==
- Shadis #37 (1997)
- AAB Proceedings (Issue 36)

== See also ==
- Marc Miller's Traveller publications
