= Sorcerer (role-playing game) =

Tabletop role-playing game by Ron Edwards

- Sorcerer cover
- Designers: Ron Edwards
- Publishers: Adept Press
- Publication: 1998, 2001
- Genres: Horror, Fantasy
- Systems: Custom

Sorcerer is an occult-themed indie role-playing game written by Ron Edwards and published through Adept Press. The game focuses on sorcerers who summon, bind, and interact with demons, powerful non-human entities who work with and against the sorcerer.

== Setting ==
The game has no definite default setting beyond a few guidelines. Examples of these guidelines include the unknown nature and origins of demons and authorities who do not believe in the supernatural. The rule examples, however, assume a modern fantasy world which to mundane people resembles our own.

== System ==
=== Humanity ===
Play focuses on a particular theme defined by each group as "Humanity". Players make conscious decisions throughout play to commit their characters towards actions that support or negate Humanity, often risking it in the process of acquiring or utilizing the power of demons. Through doing so, players are making strong thematic statements about the issue defined by Humanity.

=== Bang ===
A "bang" is a situation that requires a choice from the player as to how the character will respond to the situation. The choice will often be thematically relevant, based on the Humanity definition and earlier events in the game. For a bang to be effective, the game master shouldn't force a specific choice, and the player doing nothing should also have consequences.

The game master should prepare a number of bangs for each session in what Edwards calls a bandoleer of bangs, but be prepared to alter them on the fly or discard them if necessary. A bang doesn't have to be initiated by the game master; another player or even the player himself could identify a bang situation that requires a choice.

The term was introduced by Edwards in the Sorcerer book.

=== Conflict Resolution ===
Conflict resolution is handled with opposed rolls in dice pools. These dice can be any size, but must be uniform (that is, you only play with ten-sided dice, or six-sided dice, etc., but never mix them.) During conflict, each opposing force rolls their dice pool. The single highest die result wins, where ties are removed from the pool before looking at the next highest result. After a winner is established, the other dice are compared to determine the degree of success: the winner receives one 'Victory' for each die that shows a higher value than the highest of the loser's dice.

1. Player 1 rolls 10, 10, 5, 3 and Player 2 rolls 10, 9, 4, 4. Here Player 1 wins with 1 Victory.
2. Player 1 rolls 7, 6, 5, 2 and Player 2 rolls 3, 2, 1. Here Player 1 wins with 3 Victories.
3. Player 1 rolls 10, 4, 4, 2 and Player 2 rolls 10, 7, 5, 4. The 10s cancel and Player 2 wins with 2 Victory (because Player 2 did not gain a Victory from their 4).
4. Player 1 rolls 10, 6, 4, 4 and Player 2 rolls 3, 2, 2, 1. Player 1 wins with 4 Victories.

The number of victories determine how close the contest was: a single victory means a close win, and four or more victories is total domination. If the player receives Victories equal to their number of dice, it is considered a Total Victory. That character should receive some sort of additional advantage.

== Publication history ==
Ron Edwards began working on Sorcerer while he was a biology instructor at the University of Florida, working on his PhD and writing his dissertation about on evolutionary theory. He submitted his role-playing game to an existing publisher, who agreed to publish it and sent Edwards a standard contract, which gave the publisher control over artwork and marketing, as well as the right to revise the game later if the author does not want to revise it, and to terminate the contract whenever they decide. Edwards found the proposed contract unacceptable — inspired by indie comic creator Dave Sim, he believed that creators should be able to control their works. He self-published Sorcerer in 1996, sending it to anyone who asked for a copy and asking for $5 in return if they liked the game, and soon afterward he produced an ashcan of Sorcerer to sell at conventions. He continued to playtest and produced a fully rewritten version of the game that he began selling in PDF form after acquiring the sorcerer-rpg.com domain. He also produced two PDF supplements – Sorcerer & Sword (1999) and The Sorcerer's Soul (2000) – and also licensed Concept Syndicate in early 2000 to put Sorcerer for sale on a CD-ROM. After seeing Obsidian: The Age of Justice, an independently published RPG, at GenCon 33 Edwards decided he could publish his own RPG while retaining ownership. Edwards re-published Sorcerer through his own company Adept Press as a 128-page hardcover book in 2001. Ron Edwards and Sorcerer were subsequently awarded the second annual Diana Jones Award for "excellence in gaming" in 2002.

== Reception ==
In his 2023 book Monsters, Aliens, and Holes in the Ground, RPG historian Stu Horvath noted, "If a player's interests lie outside of testing the extreme of personal desire, or if a player has no inclination to fall into a cycle of resisting then succumbing to temptation, then Sorcerer will most likely disappoint — not because it is intense or transgressive (though it can be) but because there is literally nothing else to do in the game. It aims for, and delivers, a singular experience."

== Reviews ==
- Realms of Fantasy

== Awards ==
Sorcerer won the second annual Diana Jones Award for "excellence in gaming" in 2002.

== List of publications ==
=== Sourcebooks ===
- Sorcerer

The core rulebook. (Hardcover) ISBN 0-9709176-0-0

- Sorcerer & Sword

A supplement for adapting the Sword and sorcery subgenre and Sorcerer to each other. (Paperback) ISBN 0-9709176-1-9

- The Sorcerer's Soul

Re-examines Humanity and demons and introduces angels. (Paperback) ISBN 0-9709176-2-7

- Sex and Sorcery

A look at player interactions, gender and story creation in the game. (Paperback) ISBN 0-9709176-3-5

=== Mini-supplements ===
Edwards employs a system for smaller official and fan-written supplements where the author keeps all earnings as long as Edwards has editorial control and the mini-supplement is sold in PDF format at the Adept Press website. A mini-supplement can include rule tweaks, new setting information other variations of the basic Sorcerer concept.

==== List of mini-supplements ====
- Charnel Gods by Renee Knipe

A supplement to the Sorcerer & Sword supplement in which Sorcerers wield demon-infested weapons at the end of the world.

- Demon Cops by Ron Edwards

An urban anime-style police-setting.

- Electric Ghosts by Ravenscrye Daegmorgan

Demons infest technology, and communicates through the sound of electrical devices.

- Hellbound by Dav Harnish

Humanity is the Sorcerer's immortal soul, something that can be sold or traded.

- Schism, by Jared A. Sorensen

A psychic powers Cronenberg-inspired setting where Sorcerers are telepaths and clairvoyants.

- Urge by Clinton R. Nixon

Sorcerers are people infested with an animal spirit, and has to fight the animal urges to remain human.
