= Critters (comics) =

Comic book

Critters #1 featuring the feature characters of the strips, "Usagi Yojimbo", "Birthright" and "Cutey Bunny".

Critters was an anthropomorphic animal anthology comic book published by Fantagraphics Books from 1985 to 1990 under the editorship of Kim Thompson.

Prior to Furrlough and Genus, this was the longest running talking-animal anthology comic book series. The title lasted for 50 issues. Furthermore, it served as the flagship title of Fantagraphics' line of talking animal series in the 1980s. Alan Moore released a single "March of the Sinister Ducks" as a flexi disc in the comic's 23rd issue.

The 11 issues prior to issue 50 were switched to revolving features of issue-long stories, rather than the anthology format. The final issue returned to the standard format, with the 11 submissions to the issue published in the form of an anthology.

Declining sales led to this title's cancellation in 1990.

== Series ==
The series included in the book were:

- "Birthright" by Steve Gallacci – dystopian science fiction story set a few generations after his "Erma Felna: EDF" series in Albedo Anthropomorphics.
- "Fission Chicken" by J.P. Morgan – the adventures of an ill-tempered chicken superhero.
- "Gnuff" by Freddy Milton – a translation of Danish comics about a family of dragons written and drawn much in the style of Carl Barks.
- "Usagi Yojimbo" by Stan Sakai – the adventures of the rabbit ronin before the strip got its own book.
- "Lionheart" by Tom Stazer – in which the title character (a journalist cat) relates the bizarre stories he investigates.
- "Duck 'Bill' Platypus" by Kyle Rothweiler – an antic, knockabout humor strip about the eponymous character and his strange friends, set allegedly in Tasmania.
- "Lizards" by J. Holland (story) and Ron Wilber (art) – this series depicted the day-to-day life of Dweezil, a teenage anthropomorphic lizard, his family and friends, set on an alternate (future?) world.
- "Creepy Crawlies" by Mathson Manger – this series goes through the life of five different creepy crawlies and all the troubles they go through.
