= Of Gods and Men =

Of Gods and Men may refer to:

- Of Gods and Men (film), a 2010 French drama film
- Star Trek: Of Gods and Men, a three-part unofficial Star Trek fan mini-series
- Of Gods and Men (role-playing game), a 1991 tabletop game
