= Quagmire (disambiguation) =

A quagmire is a wetland type, dominated by living, peat-forming plants.

Quagmire may also refer to:

== People ==
- Joshua Quagmire or JQ (born 1952), American cartoonist, best known for Cutey Bunny

== Arts, entertainment and media ==
=== Fictional entities ===
- Quagmire (comics), a Marvel Comics character
- Quagmire family, characters from the animated television sitcom Family Guy
  - Glenn Quagmire, a friend of the head of the family
- Quagmire family, a principal family in the children's novel series A Series of Unfortunate Events
- Quagmire Moat, half of the Moat Twins from Eureeka's Castle
- Quagmire McDuck, a Disney character from Clan McDuck
- Quagmire, nightclub in San Junipero
- Duncan Quagmire, a character in the A Series of Unfortunate Events series by Lemony Snicket

=== Games ===
- Quagmire, a level in the game Banjo-Tooie
- Quagmire, a black enchantment from the card game Magic: The Gathering
- Quagmire, a skill in the game Ragnarok Online used by Wizards
- Quagmire, a fictitious place in the game World of Warcraft
- Quagmire! (X6), a 1984 expert-level Dungeons & Dragons module

=== Other arts, entertainment and media ===
- "Quagmire" (The X-Files), an episode of The X-Files
- Quagmire, the setting for Ben Dunn's Ninja High School comics, and the title of two mini-series spun off from them

== Other uses ==
- The Quagmire, a figurative name for the Vietnam War
