= World Tree (disambiguation) =

The world tree is a motif present in several religions and mythologies.

World Tree may also refer to:

- World Tree (role-playing game), a 2001 role-playing game
- World Tree Day, a secular day of observance in which individuals and groups are encouraged to plant trees
- Mesoamerican world tree, a prevalent motif occurring in pre-Columbian cultures of Mesoamerica
- The main setting of the television series It's a Big Big World
