= The Shadow of Yesterday =

Tabletop role-playing game

- Designers: Clinton R. Nixon
- Publishers: CRN Games
- Publication: 2004
- Genres: Sword and sorcery
- Systems: Solar System (retroactively)

The Shadow of Yesterday (or TSoY) is a narrativist sword and sorcery (with optional elements of heroic fantasy) indie role-playing game, designed by Clinton R. Nixon and published by CRN Games.

== Notable features ==
A large portion of the game content and its core mechanics, the "Solar System", have been released under a Creative Commons license, as well as being published using only open source tools.

TSoY won Best Free Game of the Year at the 2004 Indie RPG Awards, and was a runner-up for the 2004 Indie Game of the Year.

== Translations ==
The Shadow of Yesterday has been translated into Finnish (2006), Spanish (2007), German (2007) and Polish (two editions: abridged in 2009 and a new, extended and modified in 2011, also published on paper in a short limited run of 250 copies). An Italian translation is in the works.

Eero Tuovinen, the editor of the Finnish version, republished an edited and slightly revised generic version of the core rules as "Solar System" in 2008.

== Setting ==
The Shadow of Yesterday takes place in Near, a post-apocalyptic fantasy world set three hundred years after the destruction of the previous civilization. It is undergoing a rebirth. The races in TSOY (elves, goblins, and ratkin) are not seen as genetically separate races at all, but rather an evolution or devolution from human. Each of them can inclusively become "human" if they give up what makes them different.

The setting differs depending on the release. The Finnish edition has expanded the setting with minor cultures and other details and a revised map. The Spanish setting is faithful in regards to the text but has an entirely new map. The German setting has additions inspired by online discussions, but not to the extent of the Finnish version. The World of Near for Solar System is a separate 190-page treatment of the setting from the creator of the Finnish translation. The Polish version combines the original setting with rules modifications taken from The World of Near for Solar System and original rules expansions and modifications; it also includes a map from Spanish edition.

== History ==
As of 2006, the game has been through two revisions. The second edition has different cover art and more game detail, but its primary observable difference is Nixon's move to using FUDGE dice.

== Reviews ==
- Pyramid
