= Elfs (role-playing game) =

Role-playing game

Elfs is a role-playing game published by Adept Press in 2001.

== Description ==
Elfs is a role-playing game where the players take on the role of sleazy and dim-witted elves that like to loot and kill.

== Publication history ==
Ron Edwards created Adept Press, through which he published his second RPG, Elfs (2001) as a PDF.
