= Trollbabe =

Fantasy tabletop role-playing game supplement

- Designers: Ron Edwards
- Publishers: Adept Press
- Publication: 2002
- Genres: Fantasy
- Systems: Custom

Trollbabe is an indie role-playing game by Ron Edwards, cofounder of The Forge. It is an outworking of his Narrativist design philosophy. Edwards self-publishes it as a PDF through his Adept Press website.

Trollbabe requires a gamemaster and one or more other players. All players play Trollbabes, large, horned female beings which are somewhere between humans and trolls.

The players each have a single number, the "Trollbabe Number". They must roll a 10-sided die under the number for their trollbabe character to succeed at fighting, over the number for their trollbabe to succeed at magic, and whichever of the two is worse including the number (better in the first edition) to succeed at social challenges such as talking people into doing something.

Various circumstances give modifiers to the roll. The players also get re-rolls in one of two ways:

- Each player has a series of circumstances, such as "remembered spell" or "unexpected ally", which they can use once per gaming session to get a re-roll.
- They can also get a re-roll through forming relationships with non-player characters they encounter in the course of the adventure (including enemies).

Every adventure opens with the trollbabe going somewhere on foot. If there is more than one player, their trollbabes do not need to be together; the GM can cut between their adventures.

The GM predetermines "stakes" for each adventure - something that will or will not happen as a result of the trollbabes' actions.

The game also has a concept of "scale", beginning with adventures that affect one or two people and escalating between sessions (on player request) up to a scale where the trollbabes' actions affect, potentially, all humans and all trolls.
