= Cutey Bunny =

Cartoon animal superheroine created by Joshua Quagmire

Cutey Bunny is a cartoon animal superheroine created by Joshua Quagmire for a humorous line of American underground comic books that first appeared through Army Surplus Komikz, which ran sporadically for five issues from 1982 to 1985. She has since appeared through various other comic titles such as Critters from Fantagraphics Books and one-shots such as Cutey Bunny's Pearl Harbor Beach Party from Rip Off Press. As her name suggests, Cutey Bunny's powers and concept are a pastiche of Go Nagai's manga creation, Cutey Honey.

== Plot ==
Cutey Bunny (sometimes labeled "QT Bunny" for short) is secretly Cpl. Kelly O'Hare, a special agent for the United States, based in Washington, D.C. and employed by an unspecified branch of the United States Armed Forces. She is dispatched on special missions, usually directly by the President, and encounters action and adventure; frequent adversaries include Vicky Feldhyser, a kinky lesbian fox who's described as a "four-ple" agent (one level beyond "triple") for various intelligence services, and "Uncle Joe", a transparent caricature of Joseph Stalin.

== Powers ==
Cutey's powers derive from her amulet, a gift from Ra, the ancient Egyptian god of the sun (Ra is an occasional guest-star in the comic; much is made about his befuddlement with modern-day technology, such as toasters and electric coffeepots). The amulet allows Kelly to change instantly into any one of six different costumes, and gain the powers associated with each; for example, as "Rocket Bunny", she can fly with the aid of rocket-powered boots, and as "Samurai Bunny", she wears chainmail armor and can wield a katana to deadly effect. In the 5th and last issue of Army Surpluz, the amulet interacted with other forces (such as Wunner Bunny's magic lasso) to transform Cutey into Dark Cutey (one of many parodies of Marvel's Dark Phoenix) who promptly tempts her teammates with the merchandising potential of being "dark" like her.

== Development ==
Kelly is drawn as a shapely anthropomorphic bunny, often dressed in something fairly revealing, as befits Quagmire's sense of burlesque. Superhero Multiverse describes her as "the world's first African-American rabbit superheroine". She sometimes wears her hair in cornrows. She is very bright, athletic, friendly, and clean-cut, usually uttering no oaths stronger than "Gosh-a-rootie!"

Cutey Bunny should not be confused with her British counterpart and occasional co-star, Cutie Bunny, whose secret identity is Heather ap-Glendower (or -Glendowner), and who has no special powers beyond great athleticism. Cutie was introduced by Quagmire as a parody of the "Earth-Two" story concept once employed by DC Comics to explain the history of their Golden Age superheroes.

Cutey Bunny made an appearance in the independently produced "Army Surplus Komikz, Featuring Cutey Bunny" series in the early 1980s. It ran for five issues between 1982 and 1985. Issue #5 was distributed by Eclipse Comics in 1985, its logo featured on the cover. Despite blurbs for upcoming issues in Amazing Heroes, no further issues were published.

== See also ==
- List of furry comics
- Furry fandom
