= Ironclaw =

Tabletop role-playing game

- Cover of the 2nd edition Omnibus
- Designers: Jason Holmgren
- Publishers: Sanguine Games Productions, Ltd
- Publication: 1999 (1st edition) 2010 (2nd edition)
- Genres: Anthropomorphic Fantasy
- Systems: Cardinal

Ironclaw is a series of tabletop role-playing games created by Jason Holmgren of Sanguine Games, this series features anthropomorphic characters in a setting inspired by class and religious conflicts during the Italian Renaissance. Additionally, Jadeclaw is a related game that is set in a concurrent East Asian setting.

== Publication history ==
The first edition of Ironclaw was initially published in 1999 by the independent publisher Sanguine Games. In May 2002 it was voted the most-popular furry RPG in a public poll which included works of the same era such as World Tree and Furry Pirates. The second edition was published in 2010; it has since sold over 10,000 copies.

As of 2019, the game has been in continuous publication, with various add-on books such as The Book of Monsters featuring Ursula Vernon, and is run at furry conventions such as Furry Fiesta, Midwest FurFest and Anthrocon.

== System ==
Ironclaw uses a system where attributes of characters are matched to different polyhedral dice. These attributes include a character's physical, mental, and social capabilities, in addition to the abilities associated with their species. This system was later used in Sanguine's other role-playing games, including Jadeclaw.

== Published books ==
1st Edition (1999-2004):

- Ironclaw Anthropomorphic Roleplaying Game
- House Rinaldi
- House Avoirdupois
- House Bisclavret
- House Doloreaux
- Phelan

2nd Edition (2010-present):

- Ironclaw Omnibus: Squaring the Circle (2011)
- The Book of Mysteries
- The Book of Jade (2012)
- The Book of Adventures (2014)
- The Book of Horn and Ivory (2017)
- The Book of Monsters (2019)
- The Book of Corals (2020)
