= Gnuff =

Gnuff is a Danish comic book series about an anthropomorphic dragon who lives in a city with his wife Gnellie and his son Gnicky. They keep their wings hidden (they are compact enough to be concealed under their clothing) and generally try to live quietly, being considered 'outsiders' in a Carl Barks-like world of contemporary talking animals.

Gnuff first appeared in the Scandinavian fanzine Sejd (#12, 1974). Over the years, creator Freddy Milton has written and drawn many feature-length stories, resulting in a series of full-color albums, a regular Sunday-page newspaper comic strip, appearances in Critters and alongside Usagi Yojimbo

The Gnuff stories often revolve around social and environmental concerns. In an interview in Amazing Heroes #129, Milton said, "My dragons openly depict the problems of minorities. they have to conceal their old culture (their wings) to make it in our society. Also, they are a species on the decline. These are the reasons why they appeal to me."

== Awards ==
- De bedste streger i 2007 Amongst seven candidates nominated for best Comic series. 24timer Århus | 10.01.2008 | Weekend | Side 19
