= Donjon (role-playing game) =

Tabletop fantasy role-playing game

- Cover
- Designers: Clinton R. Nixon
- Publishers: Anvilwerks
- Publication: 2002
- Genres: Indie, Fantasy
- Systems: Custom

Donjon (French for "keep") is an independently published fantasy tabletop role-playing game by Clinton R. Nixon. It was published by Anvilwerks in 2002. It is a narrative dungeon crawl game. Donjon is both a parody of and a homage to Dungeons & Dragons.

Based on the results of die rolls in conflict resolution, the player adds new facts to the situation. This gives the player the power to steer the adventure in directions that the game master does not expect.

== Reception ==
Donjon, InSpectres, and Children of the Sun (2002) were finalists for the initial Indie Game of the Year award, but they lost to Dust Devils (2002) by Matt Snyder.
