= Furry Pirates =

1999 tabletop role-playing game

- Cover of Furry Pirates rulebook
- Designers: Lise Breakey
- Publishers: Atlas Games
- Publication: 1999
- Genres: Furry, pirate fiction
- Systems: Halogen System

Furry Pirates is an anthropomorphic, historical fantasy, pen-and-paper role-playing game published by Atlas Games. It is set in a parallel universe, reminiscent of 17th-century Earth. The game was written by Lise Breakey, designed by Bruce Thomas, and illustrated by Terrie Smith and Eric Hotz.

The game, as the name implies, focuses on furry pirates and their adventures. While it includes fantastic elements, including the existence of magic, it earned some notice from reviewers for its realistic rules regarding ships and ship-based combat, as well as its detailed campaign background.

Players are given a wide range of races and classes to choose, including the usual furry types avian, lupine, ursine, and so on, and the usual classes fighter, thief, etc.

== Reviews ==
- Casus Belli #120
- Realms of Fantasy

== See also ==
- Ars Magica
- Jadeclaw
