= Of Gods and Men (role-playing game) =

- Publisher: Non Sequitur Publications
- Publication date: 1991

Of Gods and Men is a 1991 role-playing game published by Non Sequitur Productions.

== Gameplay ==
Of Gods and Men is a game in which the gods abandoned humanity long ago, but new, mortal-born gods have emerged—these are the player characters. This premise gives PCs a shared identity and purpose while allowing for individual interpretations of their divine nature. Powers are represented by collectible cards, with mechanics that balance their use and retention. The game also introduces five distinct human cultures with varying beliefs about divinity.

== Publication history ==
Shannon Appelcline noted that Ron Edwards identified Of Gods and Men as one of the "fantasy heartbreakers", or fantasy role-playing games designed without using any advancements in game design since Dungeons & Dragons was originally published.

== Reception ==
Andrew Rilstone reviewed Of Gods and Men for Arcane magazine, rating it a 5 out of 10 overall, and stated that "There is nothing actually wrong with this game, but we've seen it all a trillion times before. A sustained exercise in mediocrity - if you want a straight high fantasy game, D&D does it far better. The 'divine power' idea, though excellent, is not given enough coverage to make the game worth buying."

== Reviews ==
- Dragon #241
- Backstab #11
- The Comics Buyer's Guide
