= S/lay w/Me =

Tabletop role-playing game

S/lay w/Me is a role-playing game published by Adept Press in 2009.

== Description ==
S/lay w/Me is a two-player fantasy game set in a sword and sorcery setting where one, the player, is the hero while the other, the gamemaster, takes on the role of both the hero's lover and the hero's monstrous opponent. The game is contained within a 29-page rulebook. Although the title, interior art of nude women, and text all suggest a sexual narrative will develop, nothing in the rules demands sexualized content.

=== Character generation ===
The player says aloud, "I am myself. I am smart, brutal and full of experience. I laugh in the face of the gods. I enjoy my existence. My enemies die quickly." The player then selects a Hero from a list of nine archetypes, and describes the hero's appearance. From a list of 17 places, the player selects a beginning location. Finally, the player decides on a goal for the Hero.

The gamemaster then develops the location more fully, and chooses a Monster and a Lover, selecting one Attack for the Monster from a list of eight, and one Desire for the Lover from a list of eight. The gamemaster then randomly generates a score of 4–6 for the Monster and 1–2 for the Lover.

=== Gameplay ===
==== Introduction ====
The game proceeds through an alternating dialogue of actions, each of which must contain a forward-moving event. The gamemaster starts the game by introducing the Lover.

==== The Match ====
When the Hero meets the Monster or interacts with the Lover, the phase of the game known as The Match begins. Both the Hero and the Monster accumulate dice in their dice pool by advancing their objectives. When the total of the dice pool matches the Monster's score, The Match ends.

==== The Climax ====
During the Climax phase, the player attempts to win the game by achieving the Hero's stated goal, which is completed by selecting and matching dice from each dice pool.

== Publication history ==
Shannon Appelcline describes that for Ron Edwards as of 2014, his "most recent original release is the slim, 30-page S/lay w/Me (2009). It's a two-player fantasy game that Edwards has acknowledged as 'old school' despite its narrativist focus. S/lay w/Me also returns to RPG norms, as 'characters' are individually controlled. However, most would still call it a story game. One participant takes on the role of a stalwart hero while the other takes on the role of both the hero's lover and his monstrous opponent. They narrate back and forth and there's eventually a 'match' where dice are rolled." Appelcline explained that "Though some reviewers have been uncomfortable with S/lay w/Me's artwork, its name, or its focus on monsters and sex, the game has received good reviews for its game system."

== Reception ==
Guillaume Clerc and Vincent Carleur reviewed S/lay w/Me as part of the article "Jeux Narrativistes: La sélection du bimestre" in Casus Belli (v4, Issue 12 - Nov/Dec 2014, pages 82–83, in French) and found everything in the game to be a question of choice on which goals the player can achieve, and that the game is much better than the visuals suggest.

Beth Elderkin reviewed S/Lay w/Me in 2020 as part of a list of romantic tabletop role-playing games, saying that the Monster and Lover "can be the same creature, which adds a nice Twilight-esque element to it. This is definitely a game where it’s important to set boundaries (and possibly a safe word) ahead of time, especially for folks wanting to test their kinky limits."

Michał Azarewicz found the game's rules were "not written in a simple and accessible language" and also noted that the game was not for everyone due to "the element of eroticism and sex in the game, which plays a fairly important role." But Azarewicz concluded "it can be an interesting diversion, especially if you do not have enough players for another game, or if you are looking for something to do during a trip or convention."

== Reviews ==
- "S/Lay w/Me: La belle et la bête chez Conan", Le Maraudeur (Issue 8 - Nov 2012, in French)
