= Societies Sourcebook =

Role-playing game supplement

Societies Sourcebook is a 1991 role-playing supplement for Legendary Lives published by Marquee Press.

== Contents ==
Societies Sourcebook is a supplement in which detailed descriptions of religions, societies, and associations are provided for characters. The bulk of the book covers religions for all 26 races and societies for all 31 character types in the game. Each race has multiple gods or beliefs, with some having up to six deities. Religious beliefs are accompanied by notes on the character's standing based on their Devotion level, with titles and benefits outlined for each level. For example, a Devotion of 1 makes a character a Worshipper, while higher levels like Devotee (Devotion of 10-15) offer benefits such as +1 Legends. The book also details societies for each character type, providing options like the Necromancers' Children of the Red Skull. Additional sections cover the polities of the Seelie and Unseelie courts, magical artifacts, clothing, Foe Societies, and suggestions for using the book with other FRPGs.

== Publication history ==
Societies Sourcebook was published as a 72-page book, the first book with a full-color cover from Marquee Press.

== Reception ==
Stewart Wieck reviewed Societies Sourcebook in White Wolf #28 (Aug./Sept., 1991), rating it a 4 out of 5 and stated that "Players of LL will find that this product is up to the quality they expect from Marquee Press and will no doubt be delighted by it. Gamers who have not tried LL, and refuse to do so even now, should look at this book for possible use in their alternative FRPG. The price may be a little steep for the size of the book, but I'm still amazed at how so much material fit into such a small space."

In Issue 195 of Dragon, Lester W. Smith thought this was an integral part of the Legendary Lives game together with the Player's Primer and Referee's Rulebook. Smith noted "the Societies Sourcebook is advertised as usable with any fantasy system. But while the first two books together present a quite complete rules system, it is within [this] book that the fantasy world in which the system is set becomes clearest." Smith also pointed out "the sample world description in the Societies Sourcebook reveals a worldview that focuses upon the creatures of fairie (with other fantasy cultures sort of hanging about the edges)." Smith concluded, "the world it presents is an engaging one (especially with the history, politics, and PC-specific, miracle- delivering religions of the Societies Sourcebook), capable of handling a wide range of adventure types and standing up to sustained play."
