= Cemetery Plots =

1994 board game supplement

Cemetery Plots is a supplement published by Marquee Press in 1994 for the supernatural horror role-playing game Lost Souls.

== Contents ==
Cemetery Plots, the only supplement ever published for the Lost Souls role-playing game, is a 128-page softcover book by Kathleen and Joe Williams that introduces new professions and powers for characters. The book includes more ghost types for characters and explains the various places that ghosts can stay, from "focuses" for individual ghosts to "realms" for groups of ghosts, to "outer planes" for entire worlds for ghosts.

The book also contains a full-length adventure, "Night of the Headless Biker".

== Reception ==
In the August 1994 edition of Dragon (Issue #208), Lester W. Smith gave a strong recommendation, saying the book was "full of excellent material for GMs and players alike."

Cemetery Plots was reviewed in White Wolf Inphobia #52 (Feb., 1995), rating it a 4 out of 5 and stated that "This supplement is packed with a lot of useful information, from new character professions and ghost archetypes to all of its adventure ideas. Buy this book if you want to make your Lost Souls campaign even more interesting."
