= Finieous Fingers =

American comic strip by J. D. Webster

- Author(s): J. D. Webster
- Publisher(s): Dragon
- Genre(s): Comedy, fantasy

Finieous Fingers (often misspelled Fineous even in Dragon magazine's own FAQ) was among the earliest comics that appeared in Dragon magazine.

Finieous Fingers, the title character and self-proclaimed "World's Greatest Thief", was a good-natured thief who was pestered by halflings (hobbits) and evil magic-users. He was generally found in the company of his two men-at-arms, Fred and Charly. The full-page comic was created by J. D. Webster, who was its sole author and illustrator.

The comic's appearances were sporadic due to Webster's commitments as an A-7 pilot in the U.S. Navy. In The Dragon it appeared in issues 3, 4, 6, 7, 9 through 22, 25 through 28, 30, 33, 35, 38 through 41, 43, 45, 49 through 51, 53, and 54 (October 1981). Webster then moved it to Adventure Gaming magazine, a publication that folded the following year. Finieous was next spotted in The Space Gamer and its sister publication Fantasy Gamer in 1984, but again this only lasted about a year. In the 1990s, Finieous Fingers was resurrected for a time in the pages of Shadis magazine, this time drawn by Jason Holmgren.

Author J. D. Webster is a late '70's graduate of Auburn NROTC and a former Navy pilot. Webster is currently flying for Northwest airlines and is living in Michigan with his wife and daughter. Several of his Fineious Fingers characters were modeled after friends who he dungeon mastered for: BoredFlak was based on Everett "Rett" Burge a Civil Engineer living in Stuttgart, Arkansas. Ozyamadas was based on Grant Castlebury who now works in the Texas aerospace industry. The title character was based on close personal friend Scott Mills, who currently delivers mail in the Birmingham area.

A compilation, The Finieous Treasury, was published by TSR in 1981. A limited series of 8 miniature figures based on the comic was produced by Manzakk Publishing in 1982 and made its debut at the 1982 Origins in Baltimore. 10 gold plated sets were created at that time. The sculptor of the original miniatures, Tom Meier, released a new set of 6 designs under his Thunderbolt Mountain label in 2004.

== Partial listing of Dragon appearances ==
- Issue #3, p. 17 "The Adventures of Finieous Fingers and Fred and Charly"
- Issue #4, p. 30 "The Continuing Adventures of Finieous Fingers Minus Fred and Charly"
- Issue #6, p. 27 "The Quickly Ending Adventures of Finieous Fingers And the Return of Fred and Charly"
- Issue #7, p. 24 "Beginning a New Adventure of Finieous Fingers, Or One Day in the Marketplace"
- Issue #9, p. 29 "Finieous Fingers in: The Trouble with Trifles Or!, Do Hobbits Make Bad Company?"
- Issue #10, p. 29 "Finieous Fingers, Fred and Charly in: Hobbits Are Definitely Bad Company, Or, 002½ in: You Only Get It Once"
- Issue #11, p. 29 "Finieous Fingers, Fred and Charly counter attack! Or: Dorothy Goes Off to See the Wizard"
- Issue #12, p. 29 "Finieous Fingers, Fred and Charly in: Attack on Telemark, Or, One Day in the Wilderness"
- Issue #13, p. 28 "Finieous Fingers, Fred and Charly in: "Under Fire" Or How Not to Enter an Evil Wizard's Castle"
- Issue #14, p. 27 "Fineous Fingers, Fred and Charly: Still Trying to Get into Telemark"
- Issue #15, p. 26 "Finieous Fingers, Fred and Charly in: Grond Invents the Kamburger or... Chicken Little Strikes Again"
- Issue #16, p. 31 "Finieous Fingers, Fred and Charly in: Grond Invents the Kamburger or... Chicken Little Strikes Again" (Name repeats from previous issue)
- Issue #17, p. 34 "Finieous Fingers, Fred and Charly Triumph at Last, Or Out of the Frying Pan into the Fire"
- Issue #18, p. 26 "Finieous Fingers, Fred and Charly Meet the Man, Or... Charly Gets Warts"
- Issue #19, p. 22 "Finieous Fingers Presents Prelude to Dragonquest Part I"
- Issue #20, p. 30 "Finieous Fingers Presents Prelude to Dragonquest Part II, Or Tokyo Paladin Strikes Again"
- Issue #21, p. 28 "Adventures of Finieous Finger, A Fly and a Frog; Dragonquest: Part I"
- Issue #22, p. 49 "Adventures of Finieous Finger: Dragon Quest PT. II, Or Finieous Gets Burned"
- Issue #25, p. 28 "Finieous Fingers, Fred and Charly in: "The Great Escape", Or, A Typical Day in the Wizard's Lab Part I"
- Issue #26, p. 47 "The Adventures of Finieous Fingers, Fred and Charly in: "The Great Escape: Pt. II", Or, Fred & Charly Visit the Apothecary"
- Issue #27, p. 47 "The Adventures of Finieous Fingers, Fred and Charly in: "The Great Escape: Pt. III", Or, Who Was That Ballerina with a Sword?"
- Issue #30, p. 60 "The Adventures of Finieous Fingers, Fred, Charly and Co. in Why blow your own horn when you can use someone else's?"

== Listing of Adventure Gaming appearances ==
- Issue #4, p. 41 "Revenge of the Liche: Prologue"
- Issue #5, p. 45 "Revenge of the Liche"
- Issue #6, p. 41 "If Finieous Fingers Played Traveller..."
- Issue #7, p. 49 [The liche actually returns]
- Issue #8, p. 45 "The Adventures of Finieous Fingers"
- Issue #9, p. 49 "The Adventures of Finieous Fingers"
- Issue #10, p. 57 "The Truth Behind the Hobbit Plot to Rule the World"
- Issue #11, p. 49 "The Adventures of Finieous Fingers: Curse of the Liche"
- Issue #12, p. 45 "The Adventures of Finieous Fingers: Curse of the Liche"
- Issue #13, p. 53 "The Adventures of Finieous Fingers: Curse of the Liche"

== Listing of Fantasy Gamer and Space Gamer appearances ==
- Fantasy Gamer Issue #5, (April/May 1984) p. 42 "Finieous Fingers"
- Fantasy Gamer Issue #6, (June/July 1984) p. 44 "Finger's Guide to Adventuring, Lesson One: How to Deal with the Occasional Orc Guard"
- Space Gamer Issue #71, (November/December 1984) p. 61 "Finieous Fingers"
- Space Gamer Issue #72, (January/February 1985) p. 31 "Deep Space Pirates"
- Space Gamer Issue #74, (May/June 1985) p. 41 "Deep Space Pirates Part II"
- Space Gamer/Fantasy Gamer (January/February 1989) Issue #85, p. 65 "Space'd 89"
- Space Gamer (July August 1989) Issue #86 (vol. 2 no. 1), p. 53 "Space'd 89"
- Space Gamer (October/November 1989) Issue #87 (vol. 2 no. 2), p. 62 "Space'd 89"
