= Legendary Lives =

Legendary Lives is a 1990 role-playing game published by Marquee Press.

== Gameplay ==
Legendary Lives is a game in which player character races include wolfling, serpentine, and draconian.

== Publication history ==
Shannon Appelcline noted that Ron Edwards identified Legendary Lives as one of the "fantasy heartbreakers", or fantasy role-playing games designed without using any advancements in game design since Dungeons & Dragons was originally published.

== Reception ==
Thomas Riccardi reviewed Legendary Lives 2nd Edition in White Wolf #48 (Oct., 1994), rating it a 3.5 out of 5 and stated that "Legendary Lives Second Edition should appeal to both novice and experienced gamers, allowing for emphasis on one or both of mechanics and storytelling."

== Reviews ==
- Shadis #13 (May, 1994)
- Dragon #195 (July, 1993)
