= World Tree (role-playing game) =

Tabletop role-playing game

- Designers: Bard Bloom and Victoria Borah Bloom
- Publishers: Padwolf Publishing
- Publication: February 1, 2001
- Genres: anthropomorphic, fantasy

World Tree is an anthropomorphic fantasy role-playing game designed by Bard Bloom and Victoria Borah Bloom and published by Padwolf Publishing in 2001. The setting is the World Tree, a gigantic - possibly infinite - tree, with multiple trunks, branches tens of miles thick, and thousands long. World Tree was nominated for Best Anthropomorphic Game and Best Anthropomorphic Published Illustration in the 2001 Ursa Major Awards.

Although combat plays a part in the game, most campaigns benefit from good role-playing skills on the part of the players. Almost all characters can make creative use of spontaneous magic, where characters can invent their own spell from lists of verb-noun combinations.

== Setting ==
The World Tree is described as a translation of the world's language, from the perspective of a visitor from terrestrial reality (Earth). World Tree civilization includes cities, guilds, merchants, schools, and professions (even prostitution). The civilization differs from human civilization in its lack of metals and magic everywhere.

== System ==
World Tree is a skill-based system, which uses custom d20 based system as well as playing cards.

Dice are divided into two types in World Tree, with two corresponding notations - simple dice, which are noted as dN (with N being the number of sides), stress dice (noted as sN), and botch dice. Most of the time, normal dice will be rolled, but when a situation arises where it is possible to succeed or fail spectacularly, stress dice and botch dice take the place of the normal dice.

Stress dice are open-ended and are re-rolled each time the roll equals the die's maximum value. A natural 1 on the first stress die roll indicates a possible botch, requiring a botch roll to confirm the botch. Botch dice are d6s; only a roll of 1 indicates a botch.

=== Prime species ===
- Cani are anthropoid canines, with complex social relationships.
- Gormoror are anthropoid ursines, tending towards bravery.
- Herethroy are anthropoid beetles or grasshoppers - hexapod, agricultural and musical.
- Khtsoyis are levitating heptapi (well, mostly, they have 5 eyes on eyestalks, and two mouths: one for eating, one for talking), who would be monsters, save for an accident of timing.
- Orren are anthropoid water-mammalfolk and shapechangers, prone to extreme excitement, so much so that they change their interests - and name - often and with childlike enthusiasm.
- Rassimel have the most obvious variation among the Primes, as 2/3 or 67% of them are anthropoid raccoonfolk, and the remaining third are other anthropoids based on other nocturnal mammals, including felines. They also have strong interests, but are more focused, and change their interests only rarely.
- Sleeth are nonmorphic panthera, who are predators first and foremost.
- Zi Ri are small, immortal, hermaphrodite dragons, who may also have feathers.

Each prime species has a template that initially defines the species' skills from childhood and starting attributes as well as their advantages and disadvantages. Certain species are more inclined towards character-class-like niches, although the ultimate choice still remains in the hands of the player.

=== Attributes ===
Characters in World Tree have ten attributes, that technically have no upper limit, but generally range from -6 to +6, with a score of 0 being average. The attributes are:

- Strength (Str)
- Stamina (Sta)
- manual Dexterity (Dex)
- bodily Agility (Agil)
- Perception (Per)
- Faith
- Memory (Mem)
- Wits
- Will
- Charisma (Cha)

=== Skills ===
There are Nine skill categories in World Tree: Magic, Verbs, Nouns (Verbs and Nouns are collectively called the Arts), Fighting, Athletics, Rogue Arts, Social, Crafts, and Knowledges. Some skills within some of the categories could reasonably fit into other categories.

Magic covers specific applications of magic, many of which are discussed in the Magic section below. The most obvious game effects covered in this category are:

- Cley
- Magic Analysis (Magic Sense): A World Tree character's 6th sense, and the only one that requires a conscious effort to use.
- Magic Resistance

Verbs cover the "action" parts of a spell, what the spell "does". There are 7 Verbs:

- Creoc - creation
- Destroc - destruction
- Healoc - healing and repairing
- Kennoc - knowing (divination)
- Mutoc - changing
- Ruloc - controlling
- Sustenoc - preserving and permanence

Nouns are the elements that are acted upon, that is, what the Verbs are done to. There are 12 of them, and they are the building blocks of the World Tree. Some Nouns cover the classical elements (Air, Earth, Fire, and Water). Others cover concepts: Illusion/Senses, Location, Magic, Mind, Spirit, and Time. The remaining two are more specific: Animal Matter, and Plant. Most Nouns are what they sound like.

- Airador - air
- Aquador - liquid, water
- Corpador - animal matter
- Durudor - hard earth: metal and stone
- Herbador - plant and soft earth
- Illusidor - illusion and sensation
- Locador - location/space
- Magiador - magic
- Mentador - mind
- Pyrador - fire, heat and light
- Spiridor - spirit
- Tempador - time

Fighting covers:

- Combat Options
- Life Points
- Martial Arts
- Weapon Group skills: Archery, claws and teeth (natural weapons), crushing (clubs, flails, maces), edged weapons, fencing, knives and daggers, pole and staff, and thrown weapons (anything can be thrown as a weapon).

=== Magic ===
There are several versions of magic in World Tree, which are all related:

- Feather Casting is a technique to attempt to cast a spell without paying cley for it, and the tradeoff - if it works - is lower power.
- Hammer Casting is a technique to cram more cley into a spell to increase its power.
- Pattern Magic is the use of established spells that combine the Arts into a pattern to form a pattern spell.
- Ritual Magic, also known as karcism, is alternately an elaborate way to cast a known spell, or a deal with the gods to cast a spell that wouldn't otherwise be possible.
- Spellbinding is a way of casting a spell and capturing it in an object to use as a single-use enchanted item. If the item the spell is bound to is not destroyed when the spell goes off, it may be reused.
- Spellweaving is a method of casting very complex spells at very low power.
- Spontaneous magic is making your spell up on the spot, and is the first form of magic that Prime children learn. A spontaneous spell is often called a "spont." and the act of casting one is often called "sponting."

=== Combat ===
World Tree separates combat into Basic, Combat Options, and Brawling with the rules increasing in complexity in that order. Combat is always assumed to be a stress situation. Initiative is handled either with playing cards or d12s.

Basic Combat uses a die roll comparison system, with ties being broken in the defender's favor.

Combat Options are specific combat moves or fighting styles, and have both a basic and an expert version. Being an expert at a defensive move gets you a bonus to attack against it, and vice versa, in addition to expert tricks to that move. Other than the restriction that a character cannot use Attack and Defense options at the same time, the number of Combat Options a character can use at once is only limited by what the Game Master thinks makes sense.

Brawling consists of a set of combat maneuvers used to represent a rudimentary World Tree Martial Art. Each maneuver has both an attack and a defense equation, and most also have modifiers based on species or other factors. Almost all of the equations include the Brawling skill. This system is used mostly when you want to fight without killing.

== See also ==
- Ars Magica
- Jadeclaw
- Ryzom
