= Anima: Age of the Robots =

Comic series by Johnny Tay

- Banner image for the website

Publication information
- Publisher: Self-published (website)
- Format: Limited series webcomic
- Genre: Anthropomorphic animals Science fiction
- Publication date: 2003–2006
- No. of issues: 18

Anima: Age of the Robots is a comic series produced by Singaporean writer and artist Johnny Tay. His decision to self-publish after local publishers rejected his work garnered local significance in Singapore. He received front-page coverage in local newspapers and started a trend of self-publishing among disgruntled Singapore writers.

This series was formerly called Anema. Its first two chapters were published as black-and-white comic books in 2003 and 2004. Anema then converted into a full-colour webcomic under the title Anema Online. Production continued till 2006 and concluded in 18 full-colour chapters. In early 2011 the webcomic was moved to a new site and renamed to Anima.

In May 2013, Anima was taken down by the creator, who stated "This means there will no longer be a webcomic or any other version of the series."

== Synopsis ==
Anima revolves around a global conflict on an imaginary planet called Anima. The natural inhabitants, the Animals (a word play on Earth's own fauna) are locked in a war of survival with the intelligent robots they created, which have turned evil. Anima deviates from standard sci-fi plots of robots-gone-bad and instead centres its story on the Animals, and how they relate to this brave new world.

== Characters ==
- Effdee – Leader of the Elite Team. Often called “FD” in the story, he is the quintessential hero. Fearless, determined and loyal to his allies, he never lets his small stature hamper his awesome fighting skills. His biggest weakness is lack of a personality compared to the other characters. His memorable lines are limited to motivational speeches and philosophical arguments. Animal model – dog.
- Randy – Plays the role of anti-Effdee: Cantankerous, wise-cracking and clumsy. As a mercenary, Randy is able to use any weapon and pilot any vehicle, but he is never seen haggling over money or betraying his friends like a proverbial mercenary. His fighting style consists of just spraying his cannons over large swathes of foes. Later on, he has many arguments with the team's scientist Branny. Animal model – dog.
- Moosey – A grizzled and reserved old warrior assigned to mentor Effdee. A flashback reveals his disenchantment with military affairs and why he wanted a demotion. He craves the heat of battle and the camaraderie between warriors, and proves to be both the mental and physical backbone of the Elite Team. Possesses unnatural strength. Animal model – a BIG mouse.
- Branny – A skinny scientist who realises that he's been doing the wrong thing all his life, and wants to be in the heat of battle. He is obviously the weakest in the team but seems to possess common sense in battle, emerging unscathed in most gunfights like the other warriors. Part of his battlefield success is his collection of strange gadgets and experimental weapons. Often trades snide remarks for comic relief with Randy and Jack. Animal model – rabbit.
- Jack – A proven saboteur who overcomes enemies with stealth, superb dexterity and traps. He doesn't display a coherent personality throughout the story and blurts statements unrelated to ongoing discussions. One wonders if it was war trauma or side effects of experiments that ruined him mentally. His favourite target is Branny. Animal model – frog.
- Tivimiton – The vice-commander of the Animal forces belongs to the cohorts of Androids, good robots that the Animals made after the bad robots rebelled. This time they take the Androids’ psychological guidance seriously, and Androids now fight for Anima as loyal comrades. Tivimiton possesses an almost sensitive, artistic soul. He transforms into a jet and uses a powerful particle beam and kung-fu in battle.
- Leo – Revered as Anima's modern saviour, and portrayed in the story as the perfect champion of Animals. He is peerless in all intellectual, tactical and physical arts, standing toe-to-toe with the robots’ overload Primatron in power. War and constant pressure has suppressed him into depression, resulting in him speaking in imperious or obscure tones, or even muttering poetry to himself. Animal model – lion.
- Primatron – This is the overlord of all robot activity and ambition, who directs his endless hordes of replaceable minions from his stronghold in Technopia. No reason is given on how an emotionless machine has developed personality quirks like arrogance and a Napoleon complex, but he is portrayed as a megalomaniac who yearns to destroy all An\imals like germs. Besides being incredibly powerful, he possesses superlative intellect, as evidenced by his philosophical debate with Leo in their duels.
- Deadwing – The incumbent robot air commander. Ungainly in robot form but fearsome in jet form. The first ‘super-robot’ Effdee meets in the story. His unexpected defeat to Effdee sparked a robot hunt for the hero in earlier chapters, but both seem to have a healthy respect for each other. Deadwing seems to have the most “independent” mind among the robot characters. He actually banters with the heroes during encounters and ponders his own actions, but his loyalty to Primatron is unquestioned.
- Soaron – Soaron looks almost like an ordinary aerial robot, and was designed to be one. Somehow a computer glitch made him different and mysteriously bestowed him the gift of invisibility. He took that to mean he is destined for great things.
- Garat – Nearly as devious as Primatron, Garat adopts a completely different approach in combat. He sneaks around and snipes enemies with a concealed laser. In close range he uses his hands, which are alloy pincers, to dismember Animals. Garat appears to possess awesome speed, dodging bullets and disabling guns with just his melee weapon in one instance.
- Thor – This levitating juggernaut serves as Primatron's bodyguard, and has the firepower to prove it. In battle (once so far) cannons emerge from hidden compartments in his box-shaped torso, and even his forehead carries a laser beam. Defensively he is impervious to all attacks, and in one case, can encase Primatron inside his body for a protected retreat. Thor has never uttered a word in the story.
- Brutus – Brutus plays obedient soldier to Primatron and speaks in computer verbatim, for example: “Scanning… scanning hostiles…” He transforms into a missile hover-tank and doesn't seem to have short-range weapons, preferring to use rockets and artillery fire. Brutus is feared by Animal warriors and has killed a number of Animal heroes.

== Storyline ==
The introduction relates how the Animals pursued technological prowess, creating more intelligent robots every year. Finally they created self-aware, thinking robots but ignored their moral guidance. This resulted in the robots turning evil and thinking they should control the planet. Years after a global war between the Animals and their robot rebels, protagonist Effdee and an unnamed friend smuggle supplies for refugees in robot territory. Robot soldiers ambush the duo and kill the friend, and Effdee barely escapes. Effdee gets an epiphany and decides to become a warrior. He sets out for Fortress One, the city-sized Animal military base sitting between the Animal and Robot territories.

Along the way Effdee rallies a city of slaves to robot overlords for mining precious metals. They rebel and win but realise the great price in lives they pay for freedom. Effdee himself duels Gildrik, a super-robot gone mad, and only defeats him with the help of Fiekat, an ex-commander of the Animal army. Deadwing and Sauron, robots that transform into fighter jets and both vying to be Robot Air Commander, pursue Effdee. In a surprise twist, Deadwing kills Sauron while he is busy fighting Effdee, and lets Effdee live in gratitude. At a freezing mountain location, Effdee meets the mercenary Randy. Both receive training from two highlander-like old warriors. This is also when Effdee first hears the fable of how planet Anima was created – a God-like being called the Guardian gave dumb beasts the secrets of thought, speech and doing, but withheld the secret of happiness when He was disappointed with how his creations turned out, and abandoned them.

At the outskirts of Fortress One, an active landmine wrecks Effdee's hover-car and both are escorted into the base. Because of Effdee's freeing of the enslaved Animals, he is enlisted as an officer (termed 'commander' in the Anima army) and Randy passes a few funny trials to become a mercenary for the army. Under the mentorship of Moosey, a veteran warrior blessed with incredible strength, Effdee faces his first major battle. This battle is meant to showcase the fighting abilities of the main characters and the colourful arsenal of both armies. Rivalries are set up, particularly between Randy and Garat (a robot assassin who killed his father), as well as Supreme Commander Leo and Robot Overload Primatron. The Animals barely win, and Leo realises they cannot take another beating of this magnitude. Together with his assistant, a good robot called Tivimiton, they devise a team of specialist fighters called the Elite Team. The final member count consists of Effdee, Moosey, Randy, a half-crazed acrobatic saboteur called Jack, and a scientist looking for action called Branny.

During the first mission Branny meets his old academic rival, who is now a leading scientist. The rival wants to use genetic engineering on the Animal race so they can finally defeat the Robots. The Elite Team stops him after he turns himself into a crazed super-Animal. On the way back, Deadwing ambushes the Elite Team and steals the blueprints for the secret weapon. The team trudges back in shame after barely escaping their crashing transport. Leo wishes to disband the Elite Team. An inspired Effdee suggests sneaking into the Robot capital Technopia to get the blueprints back. Everyone protests but he persuades them to agree one-by-one. Tivimiton joins them.

A long flight across one continent later, the Elite Team infiltrates Technopia from its sewers and encounters strange monstrosities like mutated Animals and abandoned Lesser Robots. They meet Zack, leader of a rebel group, who is actually Leo's cousin. With the rebels’ help, they sneak into the Argotron, the enormous tower that houses the Robots’ nerve center. The heroes fight some Robot champions like Garat, the ground forces commander Brutus, and Primatron's bodyguard Thor. They win the blueprints back and return to Fortress One. Bracing themselves for more adventures, Effdee remarks that the future will be “more than they ever imagined”.

== Reception ==
M.A.G.E magazine (a manga/comics/anime magazine in Singapore) comments that the author is 'one of the rare few...a true comic artist.'
