= John D. Webster =

American politician

John D. Webster (died December 27, 1887) was a state legislator, government official, and lawyer in Mississippi. He was born in Virginia and arrived in Mississippi in 1869. He was appointed a clerk of the Washington County, Mississippi circuit court in 1871 and was a member of the Mississippi House of Representatives in 1872 and 1873. He was a candidate for Louisiana Superintendent of Education but lost the Republican nomination to Thomas W. Cardozo. He studied law and was admitted to the Mississippi bar in the late 1870s. During the American Civil War he served in the 54th Massachusetts regiment and was a "quarter-master sergeant". He was one of Mississippi's attendees at an 1872 Colored Convention.

In 1877 he was one of the candidates seeking Democratic Party nomination for Mississippi Secretary of State. He was on the House committee investigating Judge Alderson.

== See also ==
- African American officeholders from the end of the Civil War until before 1900
