= Lost Souls (role-playing game) =

Tabletop horror role-playing game

2nd edition cover art by Rob Alexander, 1992

Lost Souls is a supernatural horror role-playing game about ghosts published by Sage Lore Productions in 1991, with a second edition published by Marquee Press in 1992. In this game, the player characters are ghosts who must fulfill an unfinished task to move on to the next life. The game received positive reviews in game periodicals including Dragon, White Wolf, and Pyramid.

== Description ==
Lost Souls is a game in which the player characters are ghosts who have returned to complete an unfinished task before they are able to move on to their next lives. The mission of these ghosts is to restore justice using their powers, and to oppose supernatural enemies such as ghosts who have chosen the path of corruption, or invaders from other dimensions.

The book includes a sample scenario. (This was increased to two scenarios in the second edition.)

=== Character generation ===
The player first chooses or randomly determines gender, details of physical appearance of the character before death, a distinctive feature, and two personality traits. From a list of ten professions, the player chooses or randomly determines the profession the character had in life. The profession defines the character's initial Power as a ghost, as well as a beginning score for each of its Base Skills. The player adds a six-sided die roll to each of these Skills. The ghost is then provided with basic ectoplasmic gear echoing their profession in their former life.

The player then determines the Cause of Death, which is related to the ghost's former occupation, and develops the character's background, including Beginning Kharma, Defense, and four interests. Kharma is related to the number of powers a ghost enjoys, which rise or fall as Kharma rises or falls.

The player then chooses or randomly determines what type of ghost the character is from a list of twenty-one types. The player also has the option of generating a still-living character who is a medium, and there are five types to choose from. Each type of ghost or medium has additional Specialties and Powers.

Finally the player makes six die rolls on the Life & Death tables to randomly determine their character's past history and the unfinished business that has caused the ghost to return.

=== Skill resolution ===
To see if an action is successful, the gamemaster first assigns the result that is needed to achieve success, which, from worst to best, are Catastrophic, Pathetic, Feeble, Inferior, Poor, Passable, Good, Great, Superior, and Awesome. The player then rolls percentile die, and cross-references the result against their relevant specialty or skill score on an Action Results Table (ART). If the player equals or exceeds the difficulty level set by the gamemaster, the character succeeds at their task.

=== Combat ===
Combat resolution uses the same ART, with ranges for combat simplified into only four categories: "brawling", "thrown", "missile", and "too far away." Every character starts the game with 20 Will to Live (WTL) points. Character who run out of WTL points risk being Reincarnated as anything from pond scum to a Higher Being, depending on the character's current Kharma score.

== Publication history ==
In 1990, Joe and Kathleen Williams wrote Legendary Lives, a role-playing game based on faerie mythology. The following year, they took the game mechanics from Legendary Lives and used it to create Lost Souls, a 120-page spiral bound book with a black & white cover by Rob Alexander published by Sage Lore Productions.

In 1992, they designed a revised and expanded second edition, a 190-page perfect-bound softcover book with Rob Alexander's original cover art now in color, and interior illustrations by Don Anderson, Ryan, Ken St Cyr, and Devin Van Domelin. The second edition was published by Marquee Press.

In 1994, Joe and Kathleen Williams and Richard Sanders created the first and only Lost Souls supplement, Cemetery Plots, also published by Marquee Press.

== Reception ==
In the October 1992 edition of Dragon (Issue #186), Lester W. Smith called the 1st edition "an odd but ultimately appealing mixture of both serious and humorous material." He noted that "character creation is riotously funny," and that "the game plays quickly and simply." He concluded, "In all, the Lost Souls game is an extremely satisfying product. Its premise is unusual, its characters exciting, and its mechanics fun. [...] I heartily recommend this game."

The second edition also received good reviews:

- Sam Chupp reviewed Lost Souls Second Edition Roleplaying Game in White Wolf #36 (1993), rating it a 4 out of 5 and stated that "Lost Souls is a game you will want to purchase if only because you owe it to your players to take a break from the modern-day serious horror roleplaying that's out there. Lost Souls is unpretentious, fun-loving, and open-ended. Indeed, the only criticism I have for the design of the game is that the publisher does not provide a complete setting for the game. Even so, it is a game I heartily recommend to those of you who love horror games or are just looking for a change."
- In the July 1993 edition of Dragon (Issue #195), Lester Smith thought "the second edition improves upon the first in multiple ways." He noted the more professional-looking color cover, more polished writing, and more variable character creation. Smith concluded, "This is not a game you want to miss. It is truly an original, and is a great good deal of fun to play."
- In Pyramid #4 (Nov./Dec., 1993), Scott Haring stated that "overall, this is a fascinating idea, well executed. Lost Souls may not become your favorite roleplaying game, but it will be one you return to time and again when you're tired of the usual struggles to keep your characters on this side of the afterlife."
