= Furrlough =

Comic book

Publication information
- Publisher: Antarctic Press; Radio Comix
- Schedule: (#1–184): Monthly (since 185): Various frequencies
- Format: Ongoing series
- Genre: Action/adventure, furry; Anthropomorphic
- Publication date: (Antarctic Press); November 1991–March 1997 (Radio Comix); April 1997–2023; Antarctic Press; 2023–present
- No. of issues: (Antarctic Press); 51 (not including spin-offs) (Radio Comix); 141 (not including spin-offs)

Furrlough is a furry comic book originally published by Antarctic Press and continued by Radio Comix. It is edited by Elin Winkler and is nicknamed (dubbed) "Your Funny Animal Anthology".

First published in 1991, Furrlough originally featured military-themed comic book stories with anthropomorphic characters, but as more issues were published, the comic expanded to also include action, adventure, fantasy and sci-fi stories as well. In 1997, Antarctic Press underwent a restructuring in an attempt to focus on more mainstream comics, and in the process several comic books were dropped, including Furrlough and its sister title, Genus. These books were still popular and profitable, however, so two former Antarctic Press employees decided to continue publishing them under a brand-new comic company, Radio Comix.

Radio Comix began publishing Furrlough with issue #52 in April 1997, and was published monthly until early 2008 when the frequency of publication began to vary. As of February 2013, 192 issues have been published (not including spin-offs), with several hundred contributors appearing over the years (with 187 writers & artists in the first 99 issues).

The first full-color issue of Furrlough, Furrlough Color Special #1, arrived in comic book shops on June 17, 2009. The first square-bound issue of Furrlough, Furrlough #190, arrived in comic book shops on September 9, 2010.

The most popular stories to appear in Furrlough (as voted by its readers) include: "Full Knight Gear" by Michael Vega, "Heebas" by Scotty Arsenault, "The Otters" by Scott Mills, "Stosstrupp" by Ted Sheppard, and "Tall Tails" by Daphne Lage.

The first issue's most notable stories was the first appearance of Joe Rosales' Romanics and Ted Sheppard's Stosstrupp, which both are among the most popular in Furrlough's Top 100 stories. Romanics stories were published in Furrlough over the years including Best of Furrlough volume 1 and Furrlough's Finest #1.

Stosstrupp was published in its own publication (Stosstrupp Review). This was something which would happen to several stories appearing in Furrlough, including "Collars and Cuffs", "Guardian Knights" (published by Limelight), "Here Comes a Candle" (Shanda Fantasy Arts), "Misty the Mouse" (Shanda) and "Zaibatsu Tears" (Limelight).

In 2023, Antarctic Press took over and resumed the publication of the comic from Radio Comix.

== Issues with indexes ==
- Furrlough #83 with Furrlough Index
- Furrlough #100
  - The Complete Furrlough Index part 2 – (#83 to #99)
  - The Complete Furrlough Artist Index (#1 through #99)
- Furrlough #107 with Furrlough Index part 3
- Furrlough #119 with Furrlough Index part 4
- Furrlough #185 with Furrlough Index Part 5

== See also ==
- List of anthropomorphic comics
