= Freddy Milton =

Danish comic creator (born 1948)

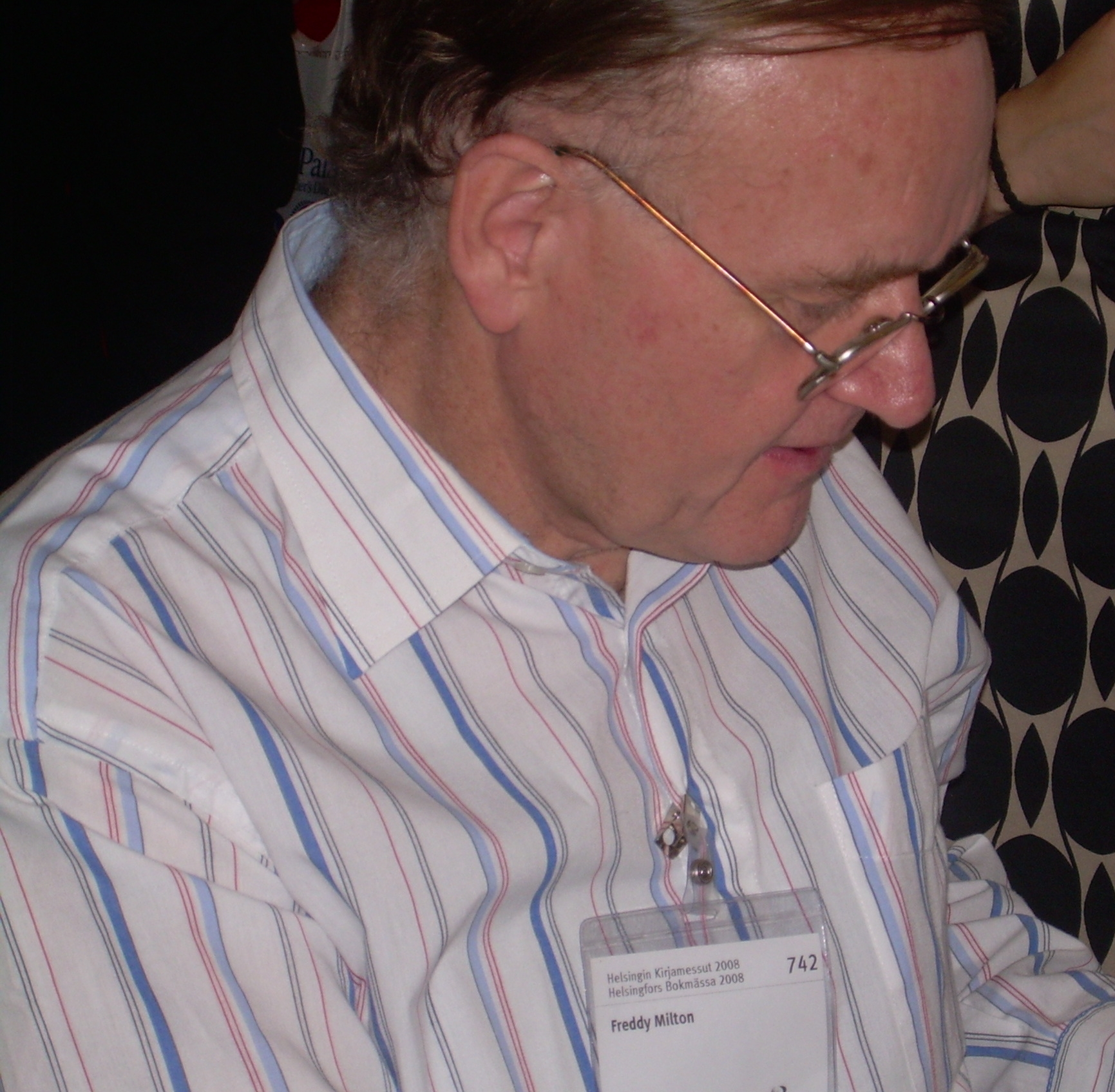
- Born: Freddy Milton Larsen Nielsen; April 18, 1948 (age 78) Viborg, Denmark
- Areas: Artist, writer
- Notable works: Familien Gnuff, Villiam

Freddy Milton Larsen (born April 18, 1948) is a Danish comics artist and writer, mostly known under his pen name Freddy Milton. He has worked with the European editions of Donald Duck and Woody Woodpecker. Familien Gnuff and Villiam are two of his own comics creations.

Since the start of his career in the 1970s, he has worked for Danish, Swedish and Dutch comics publishers. During the 2010s he has also acted as a novelist.

== Biography ==
=== Background and 1970s ===
Milton was born in Overlund, in Jutland and near Viborg. His first published comic strip was the realistic police series Zenit, produced in 1972–1973 for Jyllands-Posten. The following year Milton completed his training as a teacher at the Skive Seminarium.

Freddy Milton's comics career took off in 1974, when he became involved with the Swedish publishing company Semic Press. There he worked with the comic book adaptions of old newspaper strips, while drawing his and Magnus Knutsson's Sherlock Holmes parody Hairlock Shomes (in Danish known as Sheerluck Homes) for the comics anthology Seriemagasinet.

Most of Milton's works during the 1970s appeared in his own comics publication Sejd. It was published between 1973 and 1978, and amongst the strips debuting there were Familien Gnuff (1974–1978). During that same period, he also started the fanzine Carl Barks & Co, a Donaldistic magazine focusing on the Disney artist Carl Barks together with articles on animation.

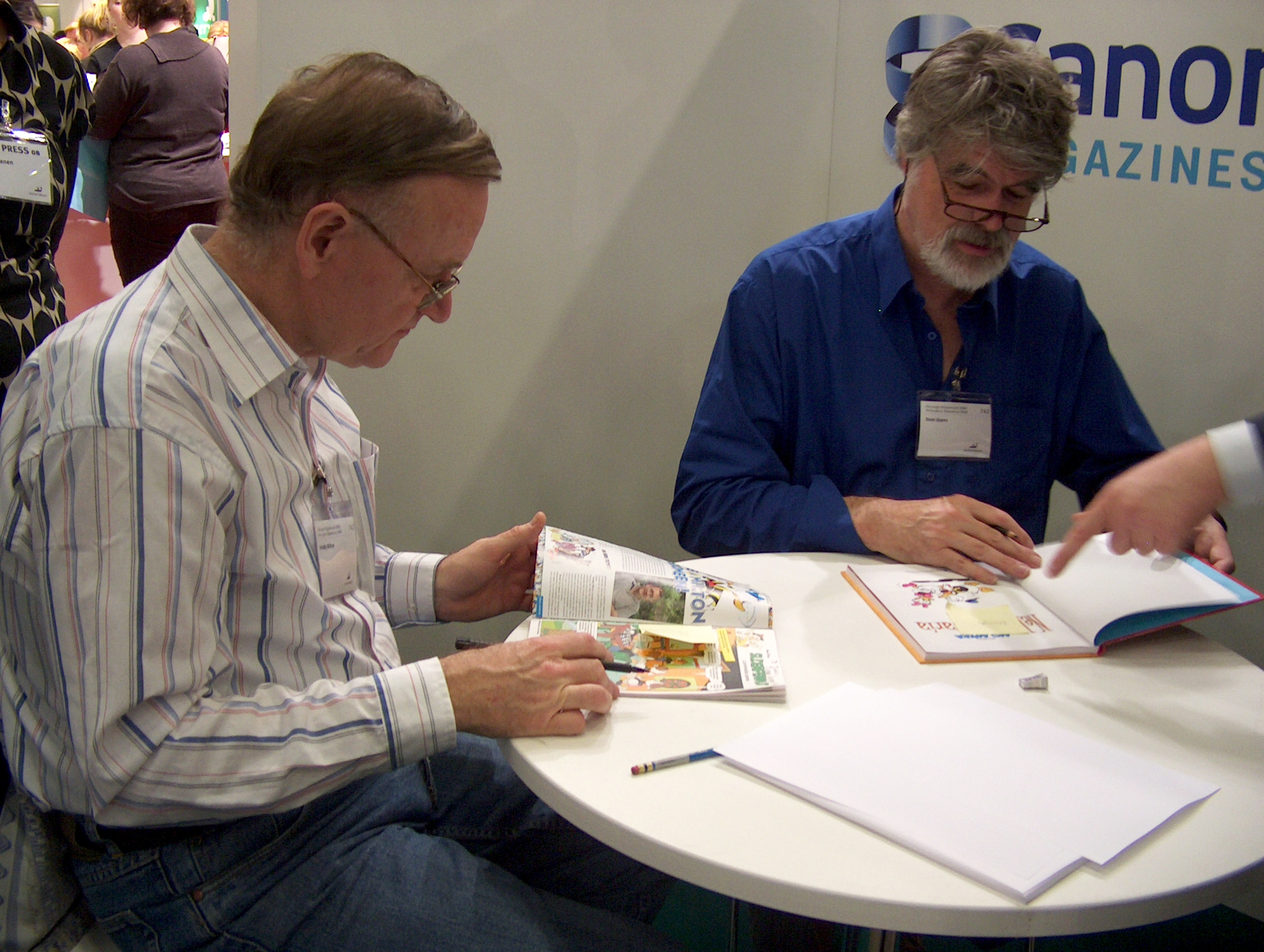
Freddy Milton and Daan Jippes in 2008, at the Helsinki book fair.

In 1975, Milton started a collaboration with the Dutch artist Daan Jippes on Disney comics stories. This led to the production of 10-page Donald Duck stories for the Dutch publisher Oberon and the Dutch comic book Donald Duck Weekblad. This phase of his career ended in 1982, after 18 collaboratively produced stories. A complete collection of these stories are being published in English in 2018 by Fantagraphics, as part of the book collection Disney Masters.

=== 1980s ===
Freddy Milton moved to Copenhagen in 1980, and there he made a living from drawing European Disney comics and from translation work for Semic Press and its Danish subsidiary Interpresse. During the following years, Interpresse released two Milton albums with Woody Woodpecker. They were also published in Norway, Sweden and the Netherlands. Later, Milton wrote stories with Woody Woodpecker and Familien Gnuff for the monthly comic book Søren Spætte (the Danish name for Woody Woodpecker) and the Scandinavian subsidiary versions. These stories were also collected into album format.

Over the years, Milton developed his own comics style containing social consciousness in a Disney-influenced drawing tradition. This social criticism was especially prominent of his adult comics like Villiams Verden (1982, followed by Villiams anden Verden in 1984) and the album series Dekalog over Janteloven (a series of stories built upon the satirical take on the Ten Commandments by author Aksel Sandemose). In 2002–2003 the latter was translated into Swedish by Seriefrämjandet, under the title Villiam's Värld: Dekalog över Jantelagen.

Towards the end of the 1980s, Milton was involved in producing role-playing books, with titles such as Hvem myrdede Kock-Robin?, Drøje dage i job-junglen, Jagten på Den vise Sten and Video eller virkelighed? In addition, he contributed to the production of a number of comics albums for LEGO; these albums were also released in Sweden (Borgungarna) and in Germany (Burg Donnerstein).

=== Later years ===
In 1995 Milton started the humorous Viking strip Svend, Knud & Valdemar, produced for the monthly magazine Glimt. This comic strip has since 2001 been released in album format under the name Jomsvikingerne (see Jomsvikings). Two years later, however, he returned to the talking animal idiom through a transposition into comics of K. H. Wieth's children's story Musebogen. In parallel, Milton continued to draw Disney comics for the Netherlands, now without Jippes and sometimes after his own scripts.

During the 2010s, Freddy Milton has also served as a novelist, often in the dystopian genre with stories from a bleak future. In 2014, the publisher Limbo released Fort Europa. In 2016 came Svinefælden and in 2017 Algernon.

== Family ==
Freddy Milton was married to Bodil Larsen during the years 1984–2000. Together they have four children.

== Distinctions ==
- 1975 – Interpresses Tegneseriepris
- 1987 – Grand'Arca Lucca
- 1987 – Kulturministeriets Initiativpris (for Drøje dage i job-junglen)

== Bibliography ==
- 1972–1973 – Zenit (with Ingo Milton), for Jyllands-Posten
- 1975–2000 – various Disney comics (Art and occasional scripts, partly drawn by Daan Jippes) for Oberon Publishing / VNU / Sanoma
- 1978–1985 – Søren Spætte and Familien Gnuff (story and art) for Interpresse
- 1985–2000 – Familien Gnuff (story and art) for Interpresse / Bogfabrikken / Arboris
- 1987 – Borgungerne (with Per Sanderhage), LEGO Publishing
- 1989–2000 – Dekalog over Janteloven (story and art; 10+1 albums) for Bogfabrikken
- 1997–1999 – Musebogen (3 albums)
- 2001–2011 – Jomsvikingerne (story and art, 7 volumes), for Arboris
- 2008–2018 – 18 novels, for Limbo
- 2018 - Freddy Milton was together with Daan Jippes dedicated a volume in the Disney Masters book series from Fantagraphics Books, in the volume titled, Donald Duck: The Great Survival Test (2018) ISBN 978-1-68396-111-6.

In 2021 Fantagraphics began reprinting Milton's Nuft series in a softcover format, collecting several stories in each volume.

- 2021 - Nuft and the Last Dragons, Volume 1: The Great Technowhiz ISBN 978-1-68396-365-3.
- 2022 - Nuft and the Last Dragons, Volume 2: By Balloon to the North Pole ISBN 978-1-68396-519-0.
