= Joshua Quagmire =

American cartoonist

- Born: 1953
- Died: May 2023 (aged 69–70)
- Occupation: Cartoonist
- Known for: Cutey Bunny
- Website: www.cuteybunny.com

Joshua Quagmire (sometimes shortened to JQ; 1953 – 2023) was an American cartoonist of underground and mainstream comic books, best known for his creation Cutey Bunny. His comic book work also overlapped with and contributed to the early furry fandom during the 1980s and early 1990s.

== Biography ==
Joshua Quagmire (the name is a pseudonym) was raised in the Los Angeles area, though he has remarked that his grandfather served in the Canadian Forces in World War I; Quagmire has dedicated a story, "The Last Time I Saw Tommy", to his grandfather. On the few occasions he has drawn himself into a story, he has not shown his own face. He is a frequent guest at the San Diego Comic Convention.

His most enduring work has been the comic Cutey Bunny, which was first published in 1982. Cutey Bunny, a furry superheroine and a pastiche of Go Nagai's Cutey Honey, appeared in the self-produced underground comic Army Surplus Komikz from 1982 to 1985 as well as in Cerebus' Unique Story section. The story, writing, and art style recall not only manga, but the madcap MAD Magazine and syndicated comic strips of the 1940s and 1950s, together with a burlesque sense of both humor and sexuality. Quagmire uses an "ensemble cast" of characters who will tend to show up no matter what the situation or genre; along with Cutey, they include:

- Vicky Feldhyser, a sadomasochistic switch lesbian fox and sometimes-rival secret agent to Cutey, whom she lusts after
- Taffy, Cutey's little sister
- Fatty Tubbins, a cat, and Cutey's friend and companion (who is also frequently credited as Quagmire's inker)
- The Space Gophers, a quintet (or sometimes more) of not exceptionally bright interplanetary-traveling gophers, all of whom are named "Al"
- Pandora, a Scottish-brogued female robot who travels with the Gophers
- Gran'ma Phooby, Cutey's "grandmother", of indeterminate species and dreadful cooking skill
- Heidi and Etsuko, a pair of German and Japanese (respectively) scantily clad female elves, typically involved in some nefarious espionage plot
- The Purple Puffle, an odd creature who appears mainly as a background ornament

In 1985, the comic was nearly picked up for publishing by Aardvark-Vanaheim, but the deal fell through and Quagmire continued to self-publish.

There are a few projects which Quagmire has done outside this ensemble, such as the more serious CyberFox or the more overtly sexual Bronco Bunny.

Quagmire is also fond of introducing caricatures of real personalities to his comics. Bob Hope and Bing Crosby, in character as they were in the popular "Road to..." movies, frequently appear to help Cutey Bunny. A frequent adversary is "Uncle Joe"—quite obviously Joseph Stalin—and his marionette henchman, "Howdy Ivan". And Cutey, as an American secret agent, is often shown taking orders from a doddering Ronald Reagan or a sinister George H. W. Bush. Even fellow comic book writer Chris Claremont appeared in one issue, helping unmask a villain who turned out to be Adolf Hitler in disguise.

Although politics was never taboo in Quagmire's comics, they have been more emphasized in his recent works. Typically, he has been even-handed in his treatment—he recounts the tale of a socialist friend of his, who, upon reading an Uncle Joe story, could not determine whether it was for or against socialism and said that it seemed to be "anti-every ideology". However, Quagmire has become more pointed in his criticism of George W. Bush and other contemporary leaders based on Quagmire's opposition to war and the current state of world economics and the environment. For example, in a 2004 story, Heidi and Etsuko join the Department of Homeland Security, and are dispatched to the Middle East to search for weapons of mass destruction—and remove the stickers on them which read "Made in U.S.A." However, they succeed only in finding weapons in practically every country in the area except Iraq.

Josh Quagmire's last online project was a comic called "Bunz & Katz" which began running in 2012. The strip is about two alien scouts, Bunz - an alien who has been altered to look like an anime "sailor chick" so as to blend in with "Dirt's" defenders, and her henchbot Katz. Sent to Earth by the all conquering but now hopelessly obsolete and ancient NegaFleet, the two hapless protagonists attempt to prepare the way for Earth's destruction but things just never seem to work out for them. Their interactions with the inhabitants of "Dirt" (as Katz translated "Earth") and their ignorance of Earthly ways make up the majority of the humor along with occasional asides into popular cultural events or politics. The last instalment was posted on May 25, 2023.

Quagmire died in May 2023.
