= Craig Hilton =

New Zealand scientist and artist

Craig James Hilton (born 1961) is a New Zealand artist and scientist known for his collaborations with Billy Apple.

== Career ==
Hilton was born in Christchurch, and has a MSc (1988) and a PhD (1995) in genetics and biochemistry from the University of Otago. The title of his PhD thesis was "Structure/function and signalling studies of the erythropoietin receptor". Hilton held a research fellowship with the Malaghan Institute of Medical Research, and worked as a paediatric oncologist and immunologist at Harvard Medical School and the University of Massachusetts Medical School in the USA. He returned to New Zealand in 2003 and obtained a Master of Fine Arts from the Elam School of Fine Arts at the University of Auckland. Currently he is Academic Advisor at academyEX in Auckland.

== Art ==
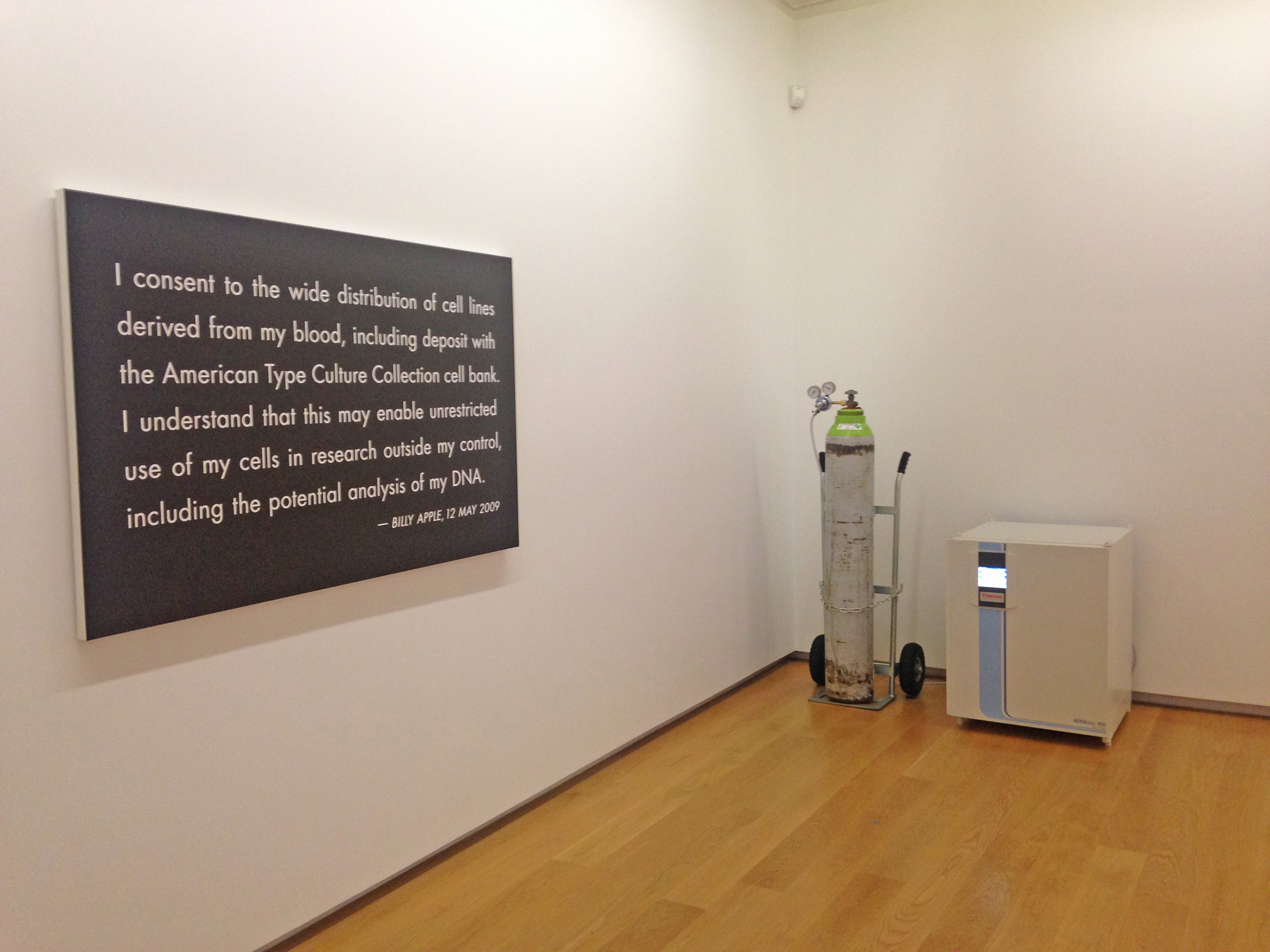
Hilton's art work The Immortalisation of Billy Apple (2010)

Hilton's artworks seek to combine artistic and scientific value through art–science collaborations. "I’d like art to do something that science hasn’t done, or maybe doesn’t have the nerve to do,” he has said. “Art needs to close the abyss between itself and science in order to regain its relevance."

In 2009, Hilton organised the show Photography Sell-Out at the Gus Fisher Gallery in Auckland, as part of the Auckland Festival of Photography, in which he persuaded 18 photographers including lauded artists like Ans Westra to sell 15 photographic prints for $15 each.

In 2016 he organised a debate at the International Science Festival in Dunedin where teams from the sciences and humanities argued the topic "You are your DNA?".

=== Billy Apple's somatic cells and genome ===
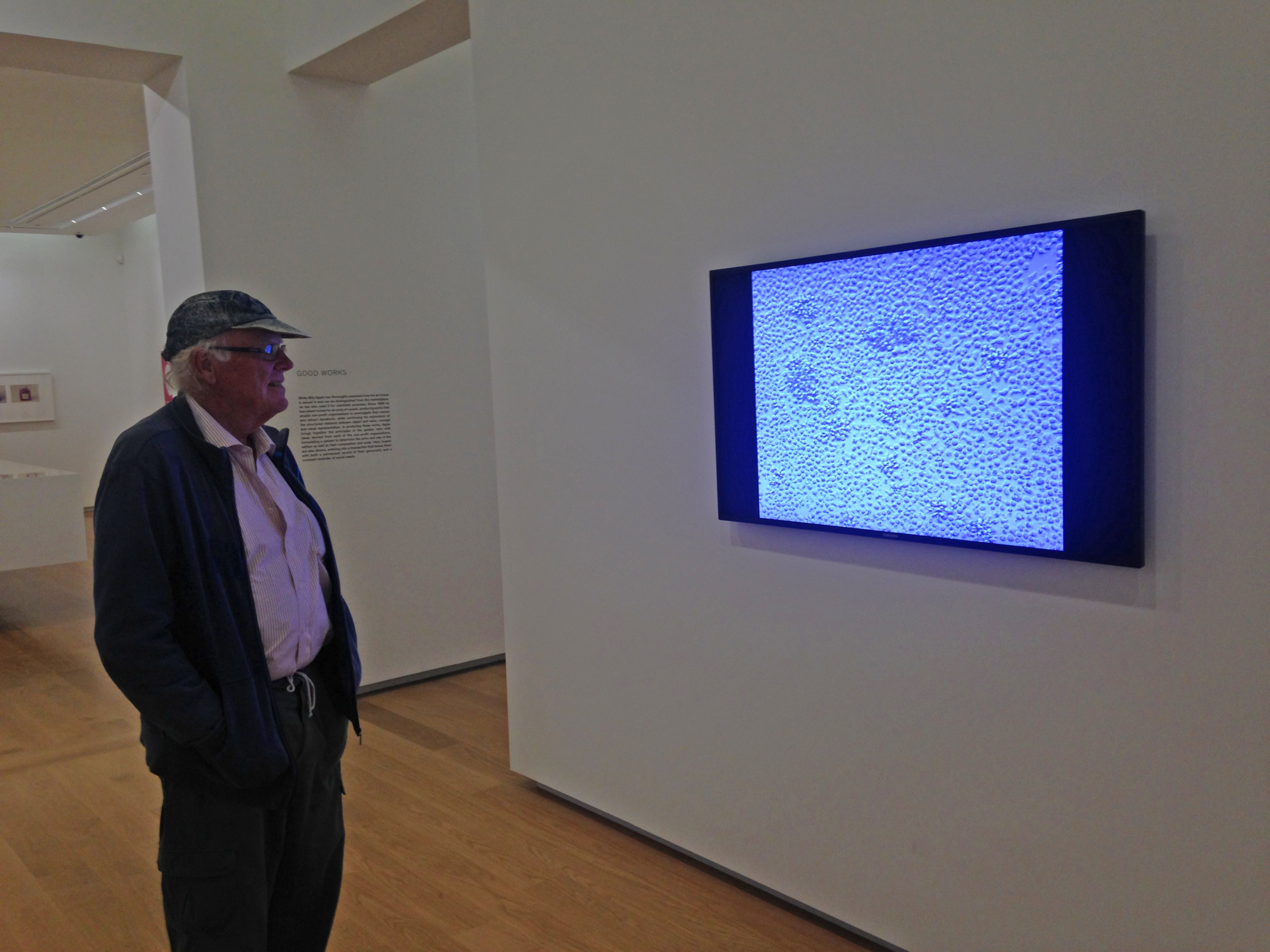
Keith Nicholls viewing Craig Hilton's artwork The Immortalisation of Billy Apple Stage Two

In 2007, Hilton asked the New Zealand artist Billy Apple for a blood sample to enable the extraction of somatic cells. This led to three science/art projects.

- In The Immortalisation of Billy Apple® (2010) scientists at the University of Auckland isolated Apple's B-lymphocyte cells from the sample, and transformed them with a virus to make them functionally immortal. The cell lines – named formally after Billy Apple® – are held at the University of Auckland's School of Biological Sciences and the American Type Culture Collection, Virginia, a library of microorganisms that serves research scientists around the world. They are the first artwork to be hosted by the ATCC. Apple and Hilton received an honorary mention in the category of hybrid art at the 2010 Prix Ars Electronica for the work.
- In the second work involving Apple, Hilton commissioned Otago University-based New Zealand Genomics Ltd to sequence Apple's entire genome for The Digitisation of Billy Apple (2014).
- The third work in the series, The Analysis of Billy Apple’s Genome (2014) presented Apple's personal genetic information in a Circos diagram.

Hilton said the three works were "designed to provoke debate around scientific advances and the ethical challenges they create".

== Billy Apple's microbiome ==
Hilton is the second author of an Auckland University-based Liggins Institute study, published in 2017, which exploited Apple's preservation of used toilet paper from an art project in 1974. Apple was able to provide Hilton's group with fecal samples 46 years apart. The group investigated how the bacteria in these had changed, and published a paper in Human Microbiome Journal.

"One of the most shocking exhibitions in the history of British art – featuring tissues soiled by Billy Apple – is now the focus of a new Kiwi scientific study. When the artist unveiled his work Body Activities – consisting of tissues and cotton buds stained with excrement and other bodily fluids – at London's Serpentine Gallery in 1974, authorities immediately ordered it be taken down. But he kept all the original tissues and more than 45 years later, researchers have found a new purpose for them, in the latest intriguing collaboration between the 80-year-old and top New Zealand scientists," wrote science writer Jamie Morton in the New Zealand Herald.

== Performance art ==
In 2016 Hilton organised an Atheist Pride March through the streets of Dunedin, New Zealand, dressed as his art alter-ego 'Sahelanthropus' – the name of an extinct species of African ape – which the public were invited to join. Hilton suggested they wear an "ancestor costume", such as an ape or a worm. "The Atheist Pride March in Dunedin yesterday was something that had to be seen to be believed," commented the Otago Daily Times. "Marcher Mandy Mayhem made ape-like calls, with low-pitched hoots transitioning into a series of quicker, higher-pitched noises, as she walked along George St holding the placard reading "Thank God! I am an atheist". As Sahelanthropus led the march, he roared chants through a megaphone, including "Uga uga uga chuga" and "free bananas for primates of all beliefs". The march ended at St Paul's Cathedral, where Hilton gave a speech. Dean of the Cathedral Trevor James engaged Hilton in the cathedral foyer. "It's good to have you here ... a conversation between science and faith is not a bad idea," he told Hilton. Hilton said the performance art aimed to celebrate the proud atheist, someone who lived in harmony with those who believed in a God.

In 2021, Hilton featured on the cover of the North & South magazine 2022 calendar, in a photo taken by Sam Hartnett, hiking in the hills with balloons on his backpack.

== Publications ==
- Hilton, Craig J.; Berridge, Michael V. (1995). "Conserved Region of the Cytoplasmic Domain is not Essential for Erythropoietin-Dependent Growth". Growth Factors. 12 (4): 263–276. doi:10.3109/08977199509028965. PMID 8930018.
- Hilton, Craig J.; Dahl, Astrid M.; Rock, Kenneth L. (2001). "Anti-Peptide Antibody Blocks Peptide Binding to MHC Class I Molecules in the Endoplasmic Reticulum". The Journal of Immunology. 166 (6): 3952–3956. doi:10.4049/jimmunol.166.6.3952. ISSN 0022-1767. PMID 11238640. S2CID 17242318.
- Jayasinghe, Thilini N.; Hilton, Craig; Tsai, Peter; Apple, Billy; Shepherd, Peter; Cutfield, Wayne S.; O'Sullivan, Justin M. (2017). "Long-term stability in the gut microbiome over 46 years in the life of Billy Apple®". Human Microbiome Journal. 5–6: 7–10. doi:10.1016/j.humic.2017.09.001.
- Hilton, Craig and Bruce Mahalski. (2018). Seeds of Life: The Bone Art of Bruce Mahalski. Rim Books. ISBN 9780994130679
