= Clinton R. Nixon =

Role-playing game designer

Clinton R. Nixon is a designer and publisher of indie role-playing games.

== Career ==
He is the designer and publisher of The Shadow of Yesterday, Donjon, Paladin, and others.

He co-administered the Forge with Ron Edwards, after they brought the site back in early 2001 at indie-rpgs.com, and they spent the next six years making the site successful. Nixon is a proponent of independent publishing in general and independent game publishing in particular.

Nixon has worked in software development, including programming for startup companies such as Lulu and directing a team of developers for the web consulting firm Viget. He started his own web development company in 2011.
