= Mike Curtis (writer) =

American writer (born 1953)

- Born: 1953 (age 72–73) Tennessee, U.S.
- Areas: Writer, editor, publisher, television host
- Notable works: Dick Tracy; Shanda the Panda
- Awards: Harvey Award 2013, 2014, 2015
- Spouse: Carole Curtis

Mike Curtis (born 1953) is an American writer who scripts the Dick Tracy comic strip, with Joe Staton as artist. He has been working professionally in comic books as a writer since the mid-1980s. He has also been a newspaper editor, deputy sheriff, comic book publisher, movie theater manager, TV horror movie host, Santa Claus for 39 years in the family tradition, and is a Baptist minister.

Curtis is currently best known for Dick Tracy, but he is also the third largest collector of Superman memorabilia in the United States. He has been exhibiting and writing about Superman since 1973.

== Biography ==
Curtis grew up in Tennessee.

In the early 1970s Curtis and his best friend and cousin Wally Hall formed a comedy team called "Curtis and Hall". The duo was very active on local TV with their show Curtis and Hall's Cosmic Banana Revue, in addition to performing weekly on college TV. Before the duo split amicably, they considered attending the tryouts for Hee Haw in nearby Nashville. One of their most frequent sketches were original routines with themselves as the Marx Brothers (with Hall portraying Chico and Curtis as Groucho). Curtis and Hall considered their best work a sketch called "Dinosaur Boogie", featuring plastic dinosaurs on wire hangers. Curtis refers to "Boogie" as "the ultimate cheap dinosaur movie".

In the 1970s, Curtis was a horror movie TV host on Channel 6 in Jackson, Tennessee, as Count Basil on Shock Theater. He brought back the character in 2010 as horror host guest at the Sivads of March event in Memphis, Tennessee honoring that city's horror host.

In the 1980s, Curtis entered the comic book field by writing Richie Rich, Casper the Friendly Ghost, and New Kids on the Block for Harvey Comics. While there, he also designed the Harvey Enchanted Forest map (based on Irish Bayou in Louisiana) and scripted several pilots for Casper TV series and specials.

In the 1990s, Curtis teamed up with artist Mike Sagara to produce his own comic, Shanda the Panda, an anthropomorphic or "furry" comic about a theater manager. With the first comic published by MU Press, the title moved to Antarctic Press for the second issue. There it ran for 14 issues, while Curtis' wife Carole produced a Native American cat adventure comic called Katmandu with artist Terrie Smith.

Later the Curtises took their titles to Vision Comics, while also beginning their own imprint, Shanda Fantasy Arts (SFA). Eventually. both flagship titles were reclaimed under the SFA Banner. SFA has published dozens of comic series and specials, including Extinctioners, Albedo Anthropomorphics, and the non-furry Last Kiss. Curtis has also written a short story and novella dealing with the adventures of George Reeves as Superman.

Shanda and Katmandu are still being published by the Curtises, but both series ended in 2012. They expect to publish an occasional comic or comic story, but the main focus is now on Dick Tracy.

When not at fan conventions, the Curtises live on a farm in Greenbrier, Arkansas. Mrs. Curtis makes jewelry, does costume work, and is active in the local Society for Creative Anachronism. Curtis is now working on several novels and other projects with various projected print dates, including an alternate history novel with friend Richard Thatcher.

Curtis donated his Superman collection in 2016 to the Cleveland Public Library for permanent exhibit in 2017.

=== Dick Tracy ===
Curtis and Staton were selected by Tribune Media Services to continue the Dick Tracy comic strip (which was approaching its 80th Anniversary) in January 2011. They are only the fifth team to ever do so. Shelley Pleger, inker, who has worked as an artist for Disney, and Shane Fisher, Sunday colorist and a talented graduate of the Joe Kubert School of Cartooning, round out the team.

On May 2, 2011, the Tennessee Senate passed Resolution 30, congratulating Curtis and Staton on their professional accomplishments.

Staton and Curtis had their first eBook collection, Calling Dick Tracy, published by Rabbit Hole Graphics.

Staton and Curtis were the 2013, 2014, and 2015 winners of the Harvey Award for Best Syndicated Strip for Dick Tracy.

== Works of Carole Curtis ==
Katmandu is a furry comic book set in a fantasy world populated by anthropomorphic feline and rodent species. It was created by Carole Curtis, originally drawn by Terrie Smith and is one of two key titles published by Shanda Fantasy Arts—along with the publisher's namesake Shanda the Panda.

The original story introduced the framing story characters, Leahtrah and Thorin. They were members of warring cat nations; loosely modeled as the equivalent of the Arab–Israeli conflict in the Middle East after World War II. That first story arc involves their adventures in the desert which led to them falling in love and marrying.

However, the primary focus of the series is the stories Leahtrah tells about her ancestor, Liska. Liska was a noted warrior chief who was first captured in a raid and kept as a slave. However, when raiders attacked the village, Liska assisted in its defence and personally killed half the raiders. In recognition of her loyalty and her prowess in battle, Liska was immediately manumitted and given status as a free warrior of the tribe. She is based loosely on Woman Chief the Absaroka Amazon, of the Crow Native American nation. Reviews have praised the book for its presentation of a detailed fictional setting and its characterization.
