= Albedo Anthropomorphics =

Comic book anthology series

- Cover of Albedo Anthropomorphics featuring the magazine's feature character, Erma Felna.

Publication information
- Publisher: Thoughts & Images, Antarctic Press, Shanda Fantasy Arts
- Schedule: Erratic
- Format: Ongoing series
- Genre: Action/adventure, military science fiction, science fantasy
- Publication date: 1983–2005

Creative team
- Written by: Steve Gallacci and others
- Artist(s): Steve Gallacci and others

Albedo Anthropomorphics, or Albedo for short, is a furry comic book anthology series that was credited with starting the furry comic book subgenre that featured sophisticated stories with talking animals primarily intended for an adult audience. The first issue of Albedo was published in 1983; the most recent issue was published in 2005.

Albedo was started by Steve Gallacci (pronounced /ɡʌˈlɑt͡ʃi/), who produced its main feature, Erma Felna: EDF—a sophisticated science fiction military series set in a sector of space populated by sapient and predominantly humanoid versions of mammal and avian species. The focus of the series is Erma Felna, a young feline officer who eventually plays a central role in the complex political conflicts that consume her universe.

Gallacci was a technical illustrator for the United States Air Force. This reflects in Albedo, through its well thought-out and illustrated vehicles. His experience is also evident in the realistic treatment of military life and operations.

The series was used as inspiration for the Albedo role-playing game, which has had three editions and multiple supplements.

== Features ==
=== Erma Felna: EDF ===
Erma Felna: EDF was set in a futuristic period in a sector of civilized outer space populated by sapient and predominantly humanoid versions of over 150 various mammalian and avian species. Although the civilization has advanced technical skills and political structure, the residents of this region have realized that they have no knowledge of their origins or past, nor any culture or arts to speak of beyond the structures necessary to maintain operational systems.

The title character is Erma Felna, a young cat who is an officer of the Extraplanetary Defense Force (EDF), the main military of the Interstellar Confederacy or ConFed for short. The series follows her adventures in part as she fulfills a career that would make her revered as "The Protector of the Rim" in the region's history, despite sexist opposition.

The ConFed is challenged by a rival and ruthless enemy called the Independent Lapine Republic (ILR) which is populated by a species of supremacist rabbits who favor taking colonies and settled areas by force. To defeat their militarily stronger enemy, the ILR is engaging in socio-political warfare intended to undermine the ConFed citizenry's confidence in their government's stability and ability to protect them.

This strategy is made evident in the opening battle of the series when the ILR invades the ConFed planet of Derzon. Once the Republic seizes the planet, they deliberately deploy their troops in such a manner that defeating them requires the EDF inflict the maximum unavoidable amount of collateral damage and civilian casualties, intending to increase ConFed civilian resentment of their own government's actions.

In addition, there are internal and growing ConFed corruption and attacks by nihilistic terrorists who commit acts of violence for their own sake to shake societal complacency. A derelict ship that contains the body of a human is eventually discovered which reveals vital clues about the civilization.

==== Reception ====
The series drew considerable attention for its unique use of talking animals, featuring characters engaged in sophisticated stories with a highly political nature, like novels such as A Very British Coup. For instance, after an action scene, the characters would often discuss the socio-political ramifications of the events in question and struggle to decide what to do in response.

==== Characters ====
- Erma Felna: The main character of Albedo. Female officer in the EDF, born SD 171–01–22 (30 years old), Annianport, Annah (Dornthant II). Fur color is a light gold-brown, slightly paler in the front, scalp hair is dark red-brown; and eyes are green gold. She shares her family's rare female genetic trait of vaguely humanlike head hair. Erma joined the EDF mainly because her father, Kanoc, was seriously tortured by the ILR.
- Toki: a Danetti (from the planet Danet) mouse femme is a friend and confidante to Erma Felna. She is a staff officer for the Extra-Planetary Defense forces (EDF). Toki has large soft ears, very expressive eyes, and a well-rounded figure and is very outgoing and free with her attentions.

==== Online version ====
In 2016 Gallacci began posting the original Erma Felna: EDF comic pages online as a webcomic, alongside other works.

=== Others ===
Other features in the series have included:

- High Orbit
- Matt Howarth's Konny and Czu
- Space Wolf
- The first episodes of Stan Sakai's Usagi Yojimbo
- Watchrats

== History ==
The title was originally self-published by Gallacci through his own company called Thoughts & Images. When the company folded, Antarctic Press resumed the title for several years, both in a black-and-white series and a short-lived color one. The series moved to Shanda Fantasy Arts in 2004, which produced two issues of the continuing series before it went on indefinite hiatus in 2005.

An RPG by the same name, based on the Erma Felna storyline, was produced by Chessex in 1989 and 1993. The concept was re-engineered in 2003 by Sanguine Productions.

There was also an associated short-lived fan magazine, Refractions, which carried original artwork, stories, and discussions of the cultures shown in the Erma Felna, EDF universe. Steve Gallacci contributed new material and cover art for each, but most material came from other sources. Published by R'ykandar Korra'ti/Low Orbit Publications in the 1990s, the series ran only three issues; a fourth was tentatively announced, but cancelled for lack of original material after the end of the color Albedo run.
