= Jadeclaw =

Tabletop role-playing game

- Designers: Chuan Lin
- Publishers: Sanguine Productions
- Publication: 2002
- Genres: Furry, oriental
- Systems: Combination of d4, d6, d8, d10, and d12 dice

Jadeclaw is a role-playing game set in the same world as Ironclaw, in a far off kingdom called Zhongguo (lit: Mandarin for "China"), inspired by Chinese Mythology, where anthropomorphic fantasy creatures control the fates of both Heaven and Earth.

== Description ==
Jadeclaw uses the same system as the prior Ironclaw RPG. Changes include more "traits" (martial arts), and there are now non-mammalian "races". There are now Birds, Reptiles (Snakes and Tortoises), and races from Chinese Mythology (such as Dragons). There are also some strange servitor races of insects (scorpions, centipedes, etc.), which are strictly NPC's (Non-Player Characters).

== Publication history ==
Eos Press published Jadeclaw in 2007 for Sanguine Productions.

After the publication of Ironclaw 2nd edition Jadeclaw was updated for the new edition in the form of the Book of Jade supplement by Sanguine Productions.
