= Ron Edwards (game designer) =

American role-playing game designer

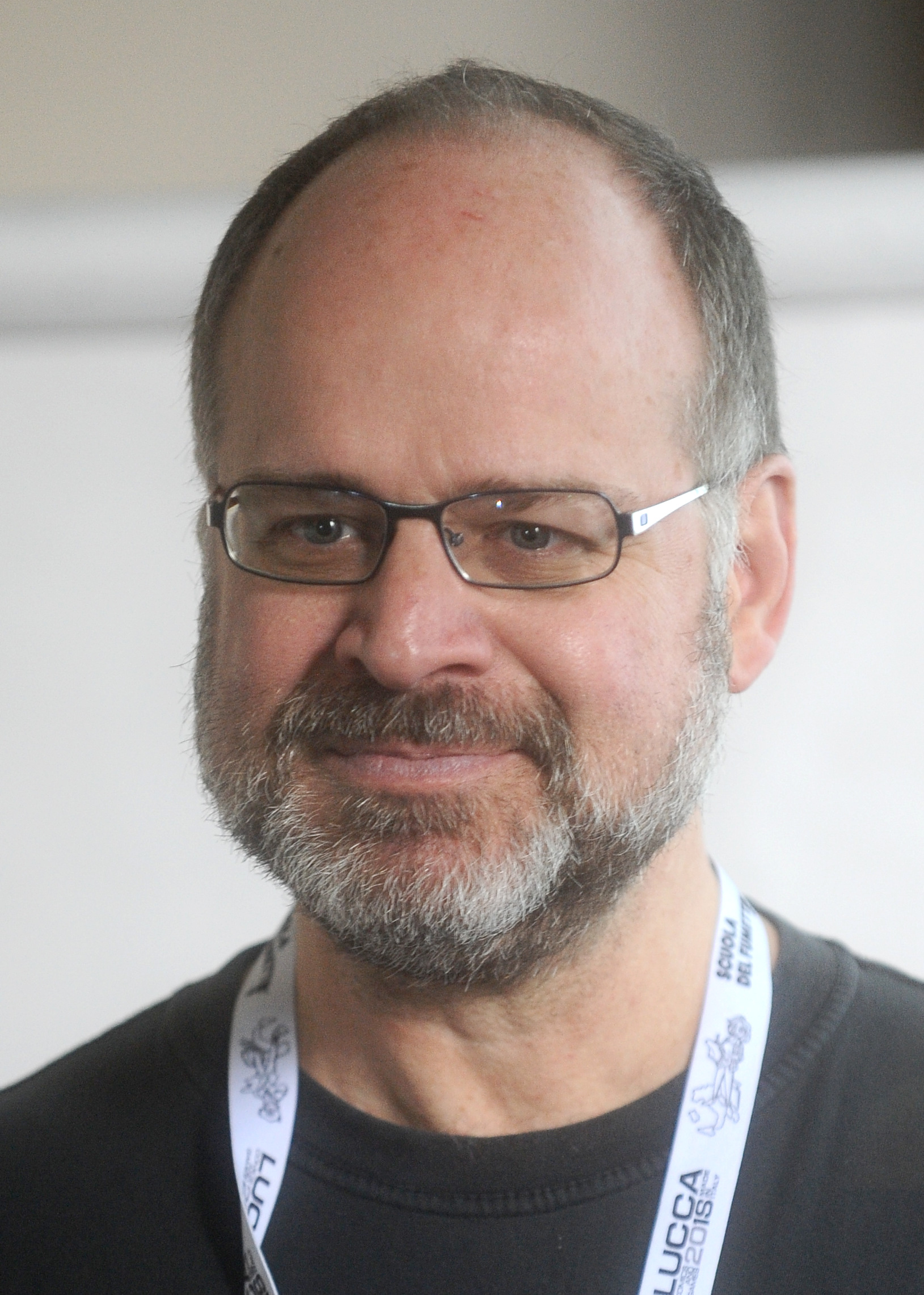
- Ron Edwards at Lucca Comics & Games 2018
- Born: September 4, 1964 (age 61); United States
- Occupation: Game designer

Ronald Edwards (born September 4, 1964) is a game designer involved in the indie role-playing game (RPG) community, and a game theorist. He created the Sorcerer role-playing game, the GNS theory of gameplay, and The Big Model. Edwards is also co-founder of The Forge, an online community to support indie RPG design and publication.

== Early role-playing ==
Ron Edwards first started playing RPGs in 1978 when he was 14, starting with Dungeons & Dragons, which had been published four years earlier. He also tried other RPGs such as Tunnels & Trolls, Runequest, and his early favorite, The Fantasy Trip. Through high school and university, he continued to play RPGs, and entered an experimental phase in the 1980s and 1990s, playing as many as 200 different RPGs, including Champions, Stormbringer, GURPS, Rolemaster, Cyberpunk 2020, Amber Diceless Roleplaying Game and Over the Edge.

== Career ==
=== Game design ===
While Edwards was a graduate student and biology instructor at the University of Florida in 1996, working on his PhD and writing a dissertation about evolutionary theory, he began to design an RPG he called Sorcerer. He sent the finished game to an RPG publisher, who agreed to publish it and sent Edwards a standard contract, which gave the publisher control over artwork and marketing, as well as the right to revise the game later if the author does not want to revise it, and to terminate the contract whenever they decide. Edwards found the proposed contract unacceptable — inspired by indie comic creator Dave Sim, he believed that creators should be able to control their works.

As a result, he turned down the offer to publish, and in 1996, he printed copies of Sorcerer and distributed them using the shareware model, sending it to anyone who asked for a copy and asking for $5 in return if they liked the game. He soon produced an ashcan of Sorcerer to sell at conventions. He continued to playtest Sorcerer and produced a fully rewritten version of the game that he began selling in PDF form after acquiring the sorcerer-rpg.com domain.

He also produced two PDF supplements – Sorcerer & Sword (1999) and The Sorcerer's Soul (2000) – and also licensed Concept Syndicate in early 2000 to put Sorcerer for sale on a CD-ROM.

=== Game theory ===
During the 1990s, Edwards was involved in discussions on Usenet about the theory of gameplay during RPGs, debating topics such as the fiction generated during role-playing — in Edwards' words, "when it is or isn't a story, and if it is, how it got that way." As Edwards monitored the Usenet discussions, he realized that different players brought dramatically different priorities to the table — what he called Gamism, Narrativism, and Simulationism. In an online article in 1999, Edwards started to posit what would become his "GNS Theory" of how those three elements were related to techniques used during role-playing.

He also began to discuss the "Big Model" of role-playing, saying, "We needed to be discussing roleplaying as a social event, which was even bigger than individual, or better, expected shared-group priorities. The name 'Big Model' refers to this 'bigness,' starting with everything that plays into who we are and why we sit down to play together." In the "Big Model", Edwards explores the layers of the role-playing game: the social event as the outer layer, the shared imagined space lying beneath that, and the rules system as the inner core.

=== The Forge and Adept Press ===
With Ed Healy, Edwards created the website Hephaestus's Forge in December 1999, as a creator-owned-game publisher site. The original site closed in late 2000 because of hosting problems, but Edwards and Clinton R. Nixon brought the site back as "The Forge" in April 2001, hosted at indie-rpgs.com. It continued to run successfully until 2012.

After seeing Obsidian: The Age of Justice, an RPG independently published by Micah Skaritka, Dav Harnish, and Frank Nolan, for sale at Gencon 33 in 2000, Edwards decided he would be able to publish his own RPG books and retain the ownership over them. He created Adept Press, through which he published his second RPG, Elfs (2001) as a PDF. He also re-published Sorcerer through Adept Press as a 128-page hardcover book in 2001. RPG historians Steven Torres-Roman and Cason Snow believe this was a turning point for indie RPGs, saying that when Edwards released the hardcover version, he "showed independent game designers the way to publish their own games." Ron Edwards and Sorcerer were subsequently awarded the second annual Diana Jones Award for "excellence in gaming" in 2002.

Edwards purchased a booth at GenCon 34 in 2001 for Adept Press; the following year, the booth was doubled in size to also include The Forge.

In a departure from his Sorcerer material, Edwards released the unusual RPG Trollbabe as a PDF in 2002, where all players take on the role of Trollbabes, large female trolls.

In 2004, he returned to Sorcerer with the third supplement, Sex and Sorcery. In 2006, he created an RPG called It Was a Mutual Decision during a 24-hour challenge that he himself had set for other RPG designers. In 2007, he created Spione: Story Now in Cold War Berlin, an RPG set in Cold War Berlin. In 2009, he published the unusual two-player RPG S/lay w/Me, where one player is the hero while the other takes on the role of both the hero's lover and his monstrous opponent. In 2015, Edwards created Circle of Hands, a gritty low-magic RPG set in the Iron Age.

== Awards ==
In 2002, Ron Edwards and his role-playing game Sorcerer were awarded the Diana Jones Award for Excellence in Gaming. The award citation reads in part "First self-published online as a for-sale PDF, Sorcerer — together with its creator and publisher Ron Edwards — represent the potential of the independent innovator in today’s RPG industry [...] His successful nurturing of an online forum dedicated to creator-controlled games have leveraged a mere brilliant game design into the seed crystal of something with the potential to greatly improve adventure gaming."

Also in 2002, Edwards was awarded an Indie RPG Award in the category "Human of the Year". His award citation reads in part "He has single-handedly done more for the indie RPG industry than anyone by helping folks get started or into the industry, promoting others' games, and generally being an amazing resource to us all [...] He is a bloody powerhouse of rock and roll game-designerdom. The man is unstoppable. He's a walking explosion of indie gaming coolness."

== RPGs and supplements ==
- Sorcerer ISBN 0-9709176-0-0
  - Sorcerer & Sword ISBN 0-9709176-1-9
  - The Sorcerer's Soul ISBN 0-9709176-2-7
  - Sex and Sorcery ISBN 0-9709176-3-5
- Elfs
- Trollbabe
- It Was a Mutual Decision
- Spione: Story Now in Cold War Berlin ISBN 978-0-9709176-7-6
- S/lay w/Me
- Circle of Hands
