= Shadis =

Defunct American independent gaming magazine

- Issue 48 (June 1998) cover
- Publisher: Alderac Entertainment Group
- Founder: Jolly Blackburn
- Founded: 1990; 36 years ago
- Final issue Number: November 1998; 28 years ago 53
- Country: USA

Shadis is an independent gaming magazine that was published in 1990–1998 by Alderac Entertainment Group (AEG). It initially focused on role-playing games.

== Publication history ==
Shadis was conceived and started by Jolly Blackburn as an independent gaming fanzine in 1990. In 1993, Blackburn formed AEG to publish Shadis as a quality small-press magazine, and brought on John Zinser and David Seay as partners. Printing of the first three issues was paid for by Frank Van Hoose, a friend of Jolly's, who also wrote for the magazine. A year later, in late 1994, the magazine received its biggest success by including a random Magic: The Gathering card in each issue at a time when booster packs of the new card game were scarce; many players bought multiple copies of each issue hoping to find a rare or out-of-print card. Many readers were also drawn to a small comic strip, Knights of the Dinner Table, which was initially a filler, intended to fill a blank spot in the magazine, but later took on a life of its own.

In 1995, Blackburn left AEG because he felt that Zinser and Seay were too focused on the new collectible card game (CCG) industry while he wanted to keep the company fun and small and focus on Knights of the Dinner Table. Blackburn departed with the rights to Knights of the Dinner Table and a few other properties. In a 2000 interview on the Gaming Outpost website, Zinser explained that he had wanted the in-debt company to grow at a faster pace than Blackburn was comfortable with, hence Blackburn's departure.

In 1998, Shadis went "on hiatus" and publication ceased.

In drawing lessons from this magazine's demise, Wolfgang Baur, the editor-in-chief of Kobold Quarterly, thought it was a mistake for Shadis to rely too heavily on content that was not focused on fantasy in general and Dungeons & Dragons in particular.

== Contents ==
Each issue contained a variety of articles covering many different aspects of role-playing game systems and genres. The series included game reviews, adventures, fiction, maps, gaming advice, and cartoons. In addition to Knights of the Dinner Table, comic strips Fineous Fingers and Bright Future also proved to be very popular.

== Reception ==
In the August 1994 edition of Dragon (Issue 208), Lester Smith wrote a favourable review, saying "A truly independent publication, it covers a wide range of topics in the gaming hobby, and always entertains."

In a retrospective review of Shadis #15 in Black Gate, John O'Neill said "it is no longer being published, and the industry is poorer for it. It was an incredible magazine, with the joy and wonder of role playing spilling off of every page. I'm glad we had it for as long as we did, and back issues are still available at various online outlets, including eBay."

== Reviews ==
- Dragon #212 (December 1994) p94

== Awards ==
During its five-year existence, Shadis was the winner of the 1994, 1995, and 1996 Origins Awards for Best Professional Gaming Magazine
