= Nana Kitade discography =

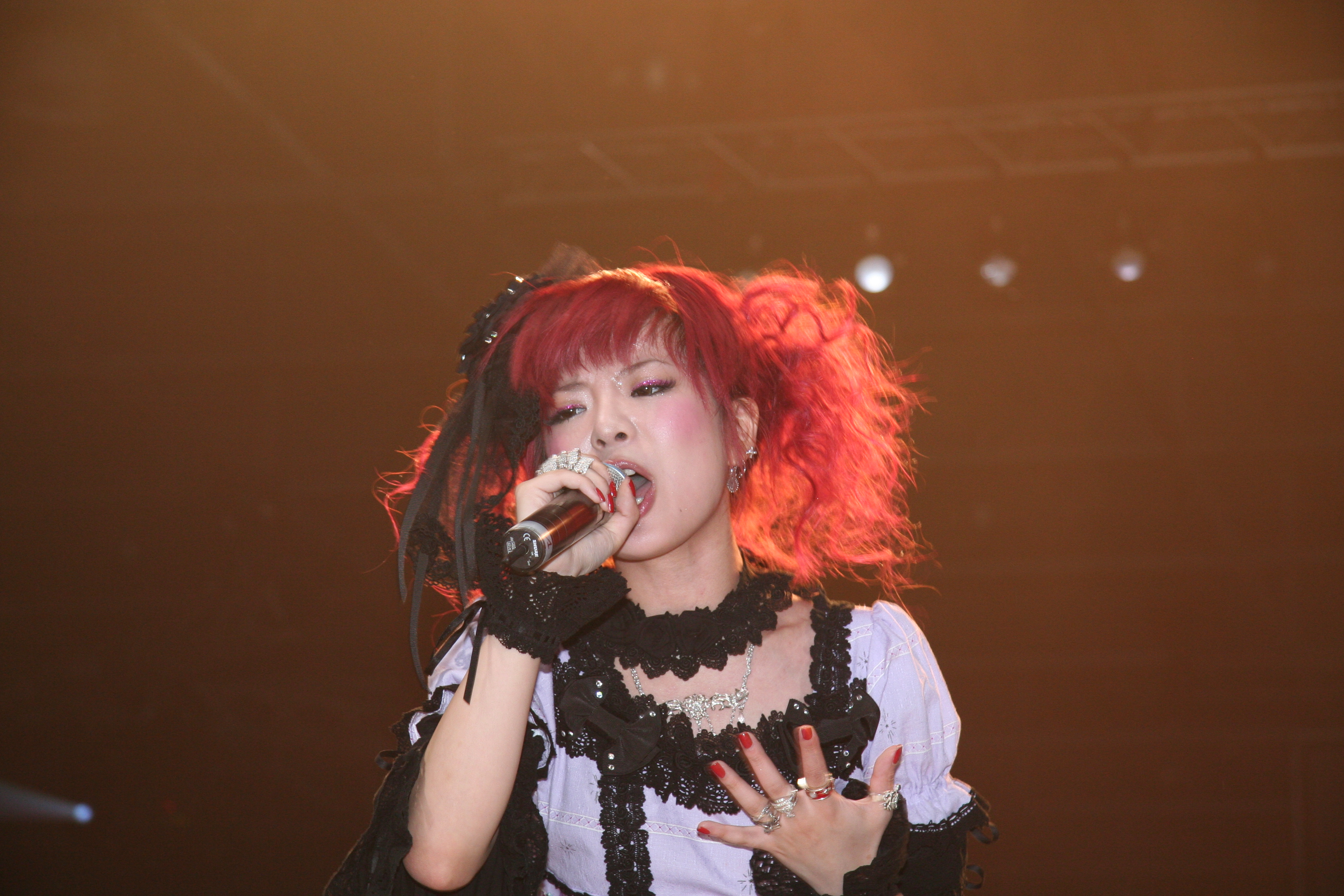
- Nana Kitade live at Japan Expo 2007
- Studio albums: 3
- Extended plays: 3
- Compilation albums: 1
- Singles: 14

This article contains the discography of Japanese pop singer Nana Kitade and includes information relating to album and single releases.

== Albums ==
=== Studio albums ===
Album information
18: Eighteen
- Release date: August 24, 2005
- Chart peak: #16 (JP)
I Scream
- Release date: December 6, 2006
- Chart peak: #150 (JP)
Bondage
- Release date: March 11, 2009
- Chart peak: #85 (JP)
Violet Blaze
- Release date: May 3, 2017
- Chart peak:
Labyrection
- Release date: November 24, 2025
- Chart peak:

=== Compilation albums ===
Album information
Berry Berry Singles
- Release date: October 31, 2007
- Chart peak: #95 (JP)

== EPs ==
#	Information
1st	Slave of Kiss: Release date: February 8, 2006; Chart peak: #79 (JP)
2nd	Cutie Bunny: Release date: July 12, 2006; Chart peak: #89 (JP)
3rd	Ai to Hate: Release date: June 10, 2011; Chart peak: --
4th	New Dawn: Release date: May 8, 2020; Chart peak: --

== Singles ==
Release	Title	Oricon peak chart positions		Album
Release	Title	Daily	Weekly	Album
10/29/2003	"Kesenai Tsumi (消せない罪)"	--	14	18: Eighteen
02/04/2004	"Utareru ame (撃たれる雨)"	--	55	18: Eighteen
07/22/2004	"Hold Heart"	--	95	18: Eighteen
11/17/2004	"Pureness/Nanairo"	--	60	18: Eighteen
06/01/2005	"Kiss or Kiss"	--	11	18: Eighteen
07/20/2005	"Kanashimi no Kizu (悲しみのキズ)"	--	26	18: Eighteen
10/04/2006	"Kibou no Kakera (希望のカケラ)"	--	64	I Scream
09/05/2007	"Antoinette Blue (アントワネットブルー)"	26	34	Bondage
03/05/2008	"Suicides Love Story"	36	64	Bondage
03/26/2008	"Siren"	--	189	Non-album single
07/23/2008	"Punk&Baby's"	--	108	Bondage
02/04/2009	"月華-tsukihana"	22	27	Bondage
09/19/2016	"Bad Babe's Dreamer"	--	--	Violet Blaze
12/19/2016	"Last Snowdome"	--	--	Non-album single
10/31/2018	"Omoi"	--	--	Non-album single

== Guest contributions ==
- Cover of "She Bop" on We Love Cyndi - Tribute to Cyndi Lauper (2008)
