= Austin Osueke =

American comic book artist

- Areas: Artist, Publisher

Austin Osueke is an American comic book artist, publisher, and founder of the companies eigoMANGA and Comic Distro. He is best known for contributing to Amerimanga and web comics through his publications Sakura Pakk and Rumble Pak.

== Bibliography ==
| Title | Primary artist | Publisher | Pub. Year |
|---|---|---|---|
| Rumble Pak | Various Artists | eigoMANGA | 2003–Current |
| Rumble Pak | Various Artists | Devil's Due Publishing | 2005 |
| Sakura Pakk | Various Artists | eigoMANGA | 2004–Current |
| The Monkey Tale | Myung(Newviz) | eigoMANGA | 2004 |
| God Drug | Stephen Anztcak | eigoMANGA | 2006 |
| Palbot and Mr. Kim Come To America | Jinsoo Terry | eigoMANGA / AGC LLC | 2008 |
| Sakura Pakk Versus Rumble Pak | Various Artists | eigoMANGA | 2008 |
| The Frog Princess | Jeff Loew | eigoMANGA / Visionary Comics Studio | 2009 |
| Danity Kane Comics | Dawn Richard | eigoMANGA | 2010 |
| Alpha League | David Karrow | eigoMANGA | 2010 |
| Natura Morta | Abril Espinosa | eigoMANGA | 2011 |
| Grimoire | Marika Herzog | eigoMANGA | 2011 |

=== eigoMANGA Productions ===
| Title | Role | Studio | Publisher | Pub. Year |
|---|---|---|---|---|
| Anime Mix | Producer | eigoMANGA | eigoMANGA | 2002 |
| Pop Japan TV | English Adaptation | Sony Music Japan | Tofu Records | 2004 |
| Shibuya Airwaves | Radio Host | eigoMANGA | eigoMANGA | 2005 |
| Basara (Vol 18) | English Adaptation | Tamura Yumi | Viz Media | 2006 |
| Flame of Recca (Vol 17) | English Adaptation | Nobuyuki Anzai | Viz Media | 2006 |
| Blassreiter | English Adaptation | GONZO | Bost TV | 2008 |
| Strike Witches | English Adaptation | GONZO | Bost TV | 2008 |
| Tower of Druaga | English Adaptation | GONZO | Bost TV | 2008 |
| Demian | Producer | Goingdol | eigoMANGA | 2011 |
| Break Ups | Producer | Goingdol | eigoMANGA | 2011 |
| Short AGE | Producer | Goingdol | eigoMANGA | 2011 |
| Christmas In Taxi | Producer | Goingdol | eigoMANGA | 2011 |
| Vanguard Princess | English Adaption | Suge7 | eigoMANGA | 2012 |
| Padak | English Adaption | e-Dehi Animation | eigoMANGA | 2012 |
