= Berry Berry Singles =

Compilation album by Nana Kitade
- Released: November 14, 2007 (Japan)
- Genre: Rock
- Length: 54:04
- Label: Sony Music (Japan)

Nana Kitade chronology
I Scream (2006)	Berry Berry Singles (2007)	Bondage (2009)

Berry Berry Singles is an album by Nana Kitade, released in November 2007. It is her first compilation album, and it features the singles "Kesenai Tsumi", "Kiss or Kiss", and "Antoinette Blue", along with other songs for nine songs total. It also features three bonus tracks including a reworking of "Kesenai Tsumi" and "Alice" with former Megadeth guitarist Marty Friedman and a cover of Daisy Chainsaw's "Love Your Money". The limited edition includes a bonus DVD with documentary footage of Kitade's performance in Paris and an interview of her and Marty Friedman.

== Track listing ==
No.	Title	Length
1.	"Kesenai Tsumi (消せない罪, Unfading Sin)"	4:17
2.	"Utareru ame (撃たれる雨, Striking Rain)"	4:01
3.	"Hold Heart"	4:21
4.	"Pureness"	4:01
5.	"Kiss or Kiss"	3:59
6.	"Kanashimi no Kizu (悲しみのキズ, Scars of Sadness)"	4:23
7.	"Sweet Frozen Kiss"	3:44
8.	"Kibou no Kakera (希望のカケラ, Pieces of Hope)"	4:42
9.	"Antoinette Blue"	4:11
10.	"Love Your Money" (Daisy Chainsaw Cover)	2:15
11.	"Alice" (Tsubureta Berry Version)	5:05
12.	"Kesenai Tsumi (消せない罪, Unfading Sin)" (I Scream Tenpura Version)	3:57
Total length:		54:04

== Singles ==
- "Antoinette Blue (September 5, 2007)
