= Night Night Night =

Single by The Teenage Kissers

from the album Lightning Machine
- Released: July 5, 2013
- Recorded: 2013
- Genre: Rock
- Label: Media Factory
- Songwriter(s): Nana Kitade

The Teenage Kissers singles chronology
"Ghost Bitch" (2013)	"Night Night Night" (2013)	"TYTD" (2013)

"Night Night Night" is the second single released by Japanese rock band, The Teenage Kissers. The single was released in a special physical edition July 5, 2013 and was distributed only at live shows. The song was later included on the band's second EP, Lightning Machine.

== Track list ==
No.	Title	Length
1.	"Night Night Night"

== Personnel ==
- Nana Kitade – Vocals, Lyrics
- Hideo Nekota – Bass, Music
- Mai Koike – Drums
- Tsubasa Nakada – Guitar
- TEAK - Arrangement
