= TYTD =

Single by The Teenage Kissers
- Released: July 17, 2013
- Recorded: 2013
- Genre: Rocki
- Label: Media Factory
- Songwriter(s): Nana Kitade

The Teenage Kissers singles chronology
"Night Night Night" (2013)	"TYTD" (2013)	"Feel Sick" (2013)

"TYTD" is the third single released by Japanese rock band, The Teenage Kissers. The single was released in a special physical edition July 17, 2013 that comprised only one track and was distributed only at live shows.

== Personnel ==
- Nana Kitade – vocals, lyrics
- Hideo Nekota – bass, music
- Mai Koike – drums
- Tsubasa Nakada – guitar
- TEAK – arrangement
