= Siren (Ruby Gloom song) =

Single by Nana Kitade

from the album ?
- Released: March 26, 2008
- Genre: Rock
- Length: 3:58
- Label: SMEJ
- Songwriter: Nana Kitade
- Producer: Marty Friedman

Nana Kitade singles chronology
"Suicides Love Story" (2007)	"Siren" (2008)	"Punk&Baby's" (2008)

"Siren" is a single released by Nana Kitade under the pseudonym Ruby Gloom. The title track was used as the ending theme song for the Japanese release of the Canadian animated series of the same name. The single was sold as both a standalone and a limited edition, which included a DVD. The single was produced by former Megadeth guitarist, Marty Friedman, who also produced Kitade's reworks of "Kesenai Tsumi", and "Alice" From her Berry Berry Singles album. Following the single's release, Kitade performed a concert while cosplaying as the titular character from the series.

== Video information ==
The video features Nana Kitade dressed as the animated character Ruby Gloom performing with other characters from the series.

Note that the above stated video IS NOT the one on the DVD however. The above-mentioned video is what has been typically shown as a music video, on music channels, and is a shortened version of the song Siren.

The DVD included in the limited release CD+DVD set has a full length version of the song, with animated scenes from the TV series put together as a music video. (SECL 636)

== Track listings ==
CD

1. Siren (サイレン)
2. My Treasure
3. Siren: Instrumental
4. My Treasure: Instrumental

DVD

1. Siren (music video)
2. Siren (Interview)

== Charts ==
Release	Title	Oricon singles sales chart peak positions and sales						Album
Release	Title	Daily	Weekly	Monthly	Yearly	Debut	Overall	Album
03/26/2008	"Siren"	--	189	?	?	413 Copies	413 Copies	New Album(NOTE:Performed song under Ruby Gloom)
