= Shibuya Airwaves =

American radio program

- Genre: World Music
- Running time: 1 hour
- Country of origin: United States
- Home station: KYCY
- Starring: Oscar Gutierrez Jr.; Tetsuro Mori; Austin Osueke
- Created by: Oscar Gutierrez Jr.; Tetsuro Mori; Austin Osueke
- Produced by: eigoMANGA
- Website: ShibuyaAirwaves.com

Shibuya Airwaves was a radio program produced by eigoMANGA created by Oscar Gutierrez Jr., Tetsuro Mori, and Austin Osueke. The show aired on 1550 AM KYCY in San Francisco, CA, and first aired on September 24, 2005. The program was composed of a music line-up ranging from anime soundtracks and Japanese pop music. Shibuya Airwaves also featured special interviews with Japanese artists. Oscar Gutierrez Jr. was the on-air host under the name "Bhodee" of the show, and Tetsuro Mori co-hosted under the name of "Tetsu". Austin Osueke also contributes as a part-time co-host under the name of "Stewart House".

Austin Osueke stated in a press release, "This radio program has become a viable platform for Americans to actually learn about Japanese music and that's why we decided to go ahead with the show. This (has) built a bridge for people to learn more about the Japanese music scene and to explore other genres of Japanese pop culture besides anime".

Austin originally produced Shibuya Airwave's predecessor, a web radio program called "Anime Mix"(Radio) on eigoMANGA's web site. Oscar Gutierrez Jr. resurrected the concept and secured an on-air timeslot for Shibuya Airwaves through his affiliation with CBS Radio. And since then Oscar began to serve as the on-air host and producer of Shibuya Airwaves. Shibuya Airwaves origins could also be traced back to eigoMANGA's publicized fan petition to bring Japanese rock groups such as L'Arc-en-Ciel to California.

Shibuya Airways branched off into producing live performances for Japanese and Japanese-influenced musicians in California. The events are called Shibuya Nights. The Japanese rock band, The Pillows headlined the inaugural event of Shibuya Nights on June 28, 2006, with the opening acts of Secret Secret, B.E.N.O.M., and Lemon drop kick. Tetsuro Mori left Shibuya Airwaves after managing this event.

Nana Kitade made her first US radio interview on Shibuya Airwaves in August 2006.

On September 12, 2006, Shibuya Airwaves revealed a new agreement to develop and distribute content via Anime Network. Under the agreement, Shibuya Airwaves provided Anime Network with content from its library of music videos, concert footage, and Shibuya Airwaves branded original programming, which feature independent and mainstream Japanese music artists. The content was added to Anime Network's Bento Beat Box lineup. Shibuya Airwaves also provide music video content to OSTN College Network.

In February 2007, Shibuya Airwaves began launching one-hour radio shows. In April, Shibuya Airwaves produced their most recent Shibuya Airwave concert in San Francisco and San Jose which featured Japanese band LiN CLOVER.

On July 1, 2007, at Anime Expo, Oscar Gutierrez announced that Shibuya Airwaves produced a spin-off radio show for XM and WorldSpace satellite radio on U-Pop. Shibuya Airwaves' XM Shows first aired in August 2007.

U-Pop aired daily episodes of Shibuya Airwaves until XM Satellite Radio eliminated U-Pop from the satellite radio lineup on November 12, 2008. U-Pop continued on XM Radio Online channel 31 and DirecTV until Sirius XM Radio ended its contract with 1worldspace in February 2009. Shibuya Airwaves has returned to current rotation on 1550 AM KYCY in San Francisco, CA.

== Partial list of artists interviewed ==
- Nana Kitade
- Sugizo
- the pillows
- Polysics
- Lin Clover
