= God Drug =

Graphic novel

- Author: Stephen Antczak
- Language: English
- Genre: Science fiction
- Publisher: Marietta Publishing
- Publication date: 2004
- Publication place: USA
- Media type: Print (hardcover)
- Pages: 200 pp
- ISBN: 1-892669-33-1

God Drug is a science fiction graphic novel by Stephen Antczak that has been reviewed as being "1 part Apocalypse Now, 1 part Salvador Dali, 2 parts The Trip, 1 pinch each of The Terminator, Mary Poppins, and Silence of the Lambs...marinade in equal parts alcohol and your favorite loud music." The novel was adapted into a comic and released in 2009. The novel is modern science fiction that was published in 2004 as Antczak's first novel.

== Author’s Background ==
In the late 1980s Stephen L. Antczak was a singer in the punk rock band Officer Friendly in Gainesville, Florida. There he co-wrote and co-starred in Twisted Issues, called one of the twenty most important underground movies of all time by Film Threat Video Guide. In 2004, he published a collection of short stories called Daydreams Undertaken, which achieved great critical success. Antczak currently resides in Atlanta, Georgia

== Plot summary ==
God Drug is the story of one large acid trip that essentially alters reality and changes the lives of several college students and drug users. The basic plot of the novel centers on the effects of the use of a form of LSD that the military tested out on some of its marines during Vietnam as a means of making its soldiers better in combat. The intent of the drug was to enable the soldiers to be able to communicate telepathically and thus be able to work together more effectively during battles. Unfortunately, the experiment did not go according to plan, and the LSD caused more warfare in an alternate reality than it was able to solve in actual reality. This powerful drug left only one survivor, Jovah.

Jovah is never seen in the book, only referred to by the other characters. Jovah's reality was drastically altered by the use of the LSD and caused all of his thoughts to become realities. These realities were constant nightmares and wars within the users’ minds that actually became real. Anything that he believed to happen in his mind would actually take place. Therefore, Jovah had to be locked away in a sensory deprived room, secluded, and deemed insane and not allowed nor able to exist in normal society. The remnant personalities of Jovah's realities and those of the other soldiers that he was telepathically linked to have now been set free and are roaming around in the real world. Jovah wishes to be God-like by consuming all of the realities and personalities that make him up so that he can be completely whole. He attempts to do this by means of the LSD trips.

These characters consist of the war veteran known as the General and the beauty Hanna. These people are not actually real but become real when one has experienced the use of this form of LSD. The story takes place in Gainesville, FL at the University of Florida where a drug dealer named Galactic Bill sells some of the LSD to college students, Tom and Sparrow who live in what can be seen as a contemporary counter culture of hippies. Tom, Sparrow, and some of their friends find their lives intermingled with Hanna and the General as they become linked with their minds and thoughts by the use of the LSD. The central struggle of the novel takes place as Hanna, Tom, and Sparrow try to fight off the General as he strives to consume all of Jovah's personalities in order to make Jovah whole once again. However, the General and the rest of the crew also fight a common enemy known as the heli-dragon, which is in true reality a helicopter that is transformed to a dragon in the reality of the LSD.

As the story takes place, the induced realities of the LSD actually become true realities in the lives of Tom, Sparrow, and Hanna. The group of friends begins encountering increasingly more strange phenomena as the novel progresses, including flying. The group perceives these occurrences to be results of the LSD, but are they really only just that? The epic war between the General, the students, and the heli-dragon ends when Hanna, Tom, and Sparrow are able to erase the war reality and transform the old into a new reality. They are now able to start their lives over and create their world as they would like it to.

The novel contains very graphic war and sex scenes, and it is also accompanied by intense artwork and drawings done by Andy Lee which adds to the overall effect of the acid trip.

== Comic Book Graphic Novel ==
eigoMANGA developed the comic book adaptation of God Drug. Installments of the God Drug comic first appeared in eigoMANGA's anthology manga series Rumble Pak. Later in 2009 a full graphic novel was released for the comic.
