= Punk&Baby's =

Single by Nana Kitade

from the album Bondage
- Released: 23 July 2008
- Genre: Rock
- Label: SMEJ
- Songwriter: Nana Kitade
- Producer: Katou Yuusuke

Nana Kitade singles chronology
"Siren" (2008)	"Punk&Baby's" (2008)	"月華-tsukihana" (2009)

"Punk&Baby's" is the 11th single released by Nana Kitade, taken from her Bondage album. The song was a change from her previous material, with Kitade remarking that it was the result of her wanting to write "something punky". "Punk&Baby's", which peaked at 107 on the Oricon Singles Chart, was used as the outro theme to the TBS program Rank Ōkoku in June and July 2008. The single was sold as a standalone CD as well as in a limited edition set, which included a DVD containing a music video for song, a making-of video and an air guitar lesson for it.

The single featured Kitade's third reworking of her single "Kesenai Tsumi" as a B-side; the previous versions being the "Raw 'Breath' Track" (from the remix single of the same name) and the "Ice Cream Tempura Version" from her Berry Berry Singles compilation album.

== Track listings ==
CD

1. Punk&Baby's
2. Lamia
3. Kesenai Tsumi/Punk&Baby's: Air Guitar Mix
4. Punk&Baby's:Instrumental

DVD

1. Punk&Baby's (A Making Document of Video Clip)
2. Punk&Baby's (Video Clip)
3. Punk&Baby's (Air Guitar Lesson!)

== Charts ==
Release	Title	Oricon singles sales chart peak positions and sales						Album
Release	Title	Daily	Weekly	Monthly	Yearly	Debut	Overall	Album
03/26/2008	"Punk&Baby's"	--	108	-	-	905 copies	905 copies	Bondage
