= Gold Coast League (California) =

The Gold Coast League is a high school athletic conference affiliated with the CIF Southern Section. Its members are all independent schools located from west Los Angeles to the high desert of Los Angeles County, California. It was formed in the 2014 re-leaguing from members of the Alpha League. The Gold Coast is known best as the nation's best high school men's and women's basketball league and is also known for their consistent state and CIF championship football and women's tennis teams, cross country and track teams, and their incredible academic rigor as schools.

== Members ==
- Brentwood School (Los Angeles)
- Campbell Hall School (Studio City)
- Crossroads School (Santa Monica)
- Viewpoint School (Calabasas)
- Windward School (Mar Vista)
- Rio Hondo Prep (Arcadia) (football only member)
