= Ghost Bitch =

Single by The Teenage Kissers

from the album Perfectly Dirty
- B-side: "Violent Lips"
- Released: June 16, 2013
- Recorded: 2014
- Genre: Rock
- Length: 7:32
- Label: Media Factory
- Songwriter(s): Nana Kitade
- Producer(s): Nana Kitade

The Teenage Kissers singles chronology
| "Ghost Bitch" (2013) | "Night Night Night" (2013) |

"Ghost Bitch" is the debut single released by Japanese rock band, The Teenage Kissers. The single was originally released in a special 3-track EP February 20, 2013 and was distributed only at live shows. On June 16, 2013 "Ghost Bitch" was re-released in digital single format through the Media Factory music label. A music video for the song was featured on the DVD edition of Perfectly Dirty. The song "Violent Lips" was used in a commercial for the EP which appeared on MTV Japan. The song "I Love You and Kiss Me" was later released as a single and appeared on the band's first full album, Virgin Field.

== Track list ==
Ghost Bitch Single
| No. | Title | Length |
|---|---|---|
| 1. | "Ghost Bitch" | 3:07 |
| 2. | "Violent Lips" | 4:25 |

Ghost Bitch EP
| No. | Title | Length |
|---|---|---|
| 1. | "Ghost Bitch" | 3:07 |
| 2. | "Violent Lips" | 4:25 |
| 3. | "I Love You and Kiss Me" |
