= Fullmetal Alchemist 3: Kami o Tsugu Shōjo =

2005 video game

- Developer: Racjin
- Publisher: Square Enix
- Series: Fullmetal Alchemist
- Platform: PlayStation 2
- Release: JP: July 21, 2005
- Genre: Role-playing video game
- Modes: Single-player, multiplayer

Fullmetal Alchemist 3: Kami o Tsugu Shōjo (鋼の錬金術師3 神を継ぐ少女, Hagane no Renkinjutsushi 3 Kami o Tsugu Shōjo; lit. "Fullmetal Alchemist 3: The Girl who Succeeds God") is the third Fullmetal Alchemist video game for the PlayStation 2 and a role-playing video game continuation of the series of Square Enix games. The first two games in the series are Fullmetal Alchemist and the Broken Angel and Fullmetal Alchemist 2: Curse of the Crimson Elixir.

== Characters ==
- Edward Elric (エドワード・エルリック, Edowādo Erurikku): The Fullmetal Alchemist, his nickname is given because the term "Fullmetal" is used to describe a person who is stubborn. In the series it is often mistakenly attributed by minor characters to Ed's automail arm and leg, or Al's armor body. He and Alphonse are the protagonists.
- Alphonse Elric (アルフォンス・エルリック, Arufonsu Erurikku): Al is Edward's younger brother, though is often mistaken to be older than Ed because his soul is trapped in a suit of armor twice as large as he is. He is also a skilled alchemist.
- Winry Rockbell (ウィンリィ・ロックベル, Winrī Rokkuberu): A childhood friend of the Elric brothers, Winry has traveled with the two to the city known as Valdora. The player can speak with her at the Vacant Church.
- Colonel Roy Mustang (ロイ・マスタング大佐, Roi Masutangu Taisa): The Flame Alchemist, who is known for his mastery of fire alchemy. He is Edward's immediate superior in the military and is quite the ladies' man.
- Riza Hawkeye (リザ・ホークアイ, Riza Hōkuai): A first lieutenant in the military under Colonel Mustang's command. She has accompanied the group to Valdora.
- Alex Louis Armstrong (アレックス・ルイ・アームソトロング, Arekkusu Rui Āmusutorongu): The Strong-Arm Alchemist and a Major in the military. He is part of Mustang's group who assisted in the battle of Valdora.
- Sophie Bergmann (ソフィ・ベルクマン, Sofi Berukuman): A mysterious young girl with a strange transmutation circle-like symbol resembling a flower embedded in her left hand. Edward and Alphonse attempt to save her when she is about to be attacked by Leonid at the beginning of the story, but Sophie ends up saving them instead when she emits a strange and powerful light that radiates throughout the metropolis. Like Alphonse, she has a fondness for stray cats. She is fourteen years old.
- Victor Bergmann (ヴィクトール・ベルクマン, Vikutōru Berukuman): Sophie's father and an alchemist who was murdered by Zelgius. Sophie constantly thinks about her father.
- First Lieutenant Romeo Craigin (ロメオ・クレイギン中尉, Romeo Kureigin Chūi): He is an officer in the Valdora Military. He is famous as for his excellence as a soldier and weapons he made.
- Lieutenant Colonel Venus Rosemaria (ヴィーメス・ローズマリア中佐, Vīnasu Rōzumaria Chūsa): She is the captain of an independent Valdora Military organization, an attractive woman who dresses very provocatively. She's often referred to as the 'Red Rose' for her customized crimson attire.
- Second Lieutenant Izzy Trigger (イジー・トリガー少尉, Ijī Torigā Shōi): A member of the military, who wears glasses and an olive version of the State Military's uniform. He is one of Rosemaria's subordinates. He goes insane after his friends are killed by flying beasts.
- Second Lieutenant Boris Hammer (ボリス・ハンマー少尉, Borisu Hanmā Shōi): Another member of the military, a distinctly fat and short man. He is also one of Rosemaria's subordinates.
- Verda the Legendary Witch (伝説の魔女 ヴェルザ, Densetsu no Majo Veruza): A mysterious woman with white hair and white clothing. Once a kind and benevolent being, she has suffered a great deal because the people around her abused her for her strange nature. She is the final boss in the game. The church that Winry and Sophie stay at appears to have a giant statue of Verda with her hands together as if she's praying.
- Zelgius of Purgatory (煉獄のゼルギウス, Rengoku no Zerugiusu): The Fire Priest and leader of the priests who control the city Sophie lives in. In the past, Zelgius worked together with Sophie's father on experiments which likely are the source behind Sophie's mysterious powers. He wears a fierce demonic mask and bears the symbol of a lion.
- Janice of the Hurricane (疾風のジャニス, Shippū no Janisu): A young woman with blonde hair and suggestive attire. She bears the symbol of an eagle on her upper left thigh. She is the Wind Priest of the group led by Zelgius. She has the ability to levitate in midair and fly.
- Leonid of Diamond Dust (氷塵のレオニード, Hyōjin no Rionīdo): An effeminate young man, who is associated with shadows and a member of Zelgius's group. His symbol is a shark emerging from the water, which appears on his abdomen. He has the ability to create ice and is known as the Ice Priest.
- Godot of the Fissure (地裂のゴドー, Chiretsu no Godō): A masked brute bearing the symbol of a buffalo on his shoulder. He is a member of Zelgius's group known as the Earth Priest. He never speaks due to his intellectual disability and feral nature, merely grunts and moans.
- Fuhrer King Bradley (キング・ブラッドレイ大総統, Kingu Buraddorei Daisōtō) : The Führer of the Amestrian Military, and a boss in the end of the game that the player does not have to defeat. Defeating him will only change the ending.

== Story ==
Valdora (ヴァルドラ, Varudora) is a large city completely surrounded by snow-capped mountains. Edward, Alphonse, and Winry meet Sophie Bergmann, a fourteen-year-old girl with silver hair and light blue eyes who has been cornered by Leonid, the guardian of ice. When Edward's attempt to save her from him fails, she uses a strange power causing a blinding golden light to light up the entire sky.

Afterward, Leonid retreats, and Sophie passes out. The trio run to her aid. Soon after they've learned each other's names, Sophie takes Edward and Alphonse and presses her seal (a transmutation circle shaped like a flower) onto Edward's right hand, and Alphonse's shoulder, increasing their alchemic abilities.

They sought out the Guardians of Ice, Wind, Earth, and Fire to get closer to solving the mystery of Verda. During this time, they progress through an ancient castle, where on the balcony, Sophie experiences strange pulsations accompanied with voices that make her scream. A strange transmutation circle is inscribed in the ground right by a rock-like platform that has handcuffs hanging down from chains to suspend someone.

Ahead, the balcony overlooks the mountains. Sophie and the Elric brothers are surprised by Romeo Craigin, who are then taken into Custody by Venus Rosemaria and her subordinates Izzy Trigger and Boris Hammer. Edward yells for Sophie to escape. Alphonse is strapped to an Electrical machine for testing, and Edward stripped and locked in a cold jail cell with nothing but his boxers to stay warm, but Edward finds a way out and they escape the military base together.

Upon fighting and defeating three of the four guardians twice, the brothers discover that they lose their power, and wither away into dust. Sophie saves Leonid who has been lifted from his curse, but is only shot and killed by Romeo Craigin moments after the trio leave the area. The brothers' journey finally comes to a close after reaching the highest level in the Shrine of Verda, where they find Sophie who has been possessed by Verda because of the red rock that Zelgius placed in her chest, and break her out of the trance.

They fight Verda as a hideous, enormous monster with a skull for a face. Upon defeating Verda, she gets sucked into the ground but re-emerges again in a human form with glowing eyes and covered with blood, creating a massive vortex of wind and red light in her rage. Sophie approaches her, and despite the fact that Verda attacks her twice, she still survives almost unharmed (except for some bleeding on her forehead). Sophie then wraps her arms around the angry Verda, crying, and her words cause Verda to calm down, and she hugs her in return. Her eyes are shadowed out, but a tear falls and lands on Sophie's face where she begins to wither to dust. Her gentle eyes are revealed for a split second, and her last word being a "thank you" before vanishing for good.

Afterwards, all of the monsters that were summoned when Zelgius initially placed the red stone in Sophie's chest, vanished as well, leaving citizens and military soldiers alike thankful and relieved that the terror was finally over. Zelgius, who is standing on the balcony with Roy Mustang notices that everything's vanished, and after saying his final farewell, he sets himself on fire and disappears into the air. They return to the Church to find Winry and Sophie's white cat, Norn, and decide to report to Mustang together.

On the way through the empty streets, Edward is pushed back from Sophie by Winry, who is talking with their friend, which causes him to fall behind the other three. In a shadowed alley, Trigger stands with a knife, his head covered with a blanket while he mutters to himself. He has gone insane from his friends' death by the flying monsters. The moment Edward reaches the alley, and his friends are far ahead, Trigger lunges out and stabs him in the chest, then walks away, causing Ed to collapse.

Alphonse, Sophie, and Winry turn around after hearing a thump from behind them and run to his side, crying in shock. Sophie then after seeing him lying there motionless, decides to use her power to heal him. She places her hands over the wound in his chest and a light starts glowing. She meets Edward (who is strangely floating upside down) in a beautiful looking place with a sunset on one side and the daylight on the other and converses with him. Edward screams her name out before she vanishes, and realizes that he has been healed.

When he turns, he sees Sophie sitting with a blank and vacant expression, and Winry sobbing uncontrollably by her side. He then suddenly realizes that something is wrong. Afterwards, Edward and Alphonse meet Führer Bradley at the Headquarters which turns into a fight, where winning or losing will not change the ending.

Upon losing the battle, Edward is knocked unconscious by Major Alex Louis Armstrong where he and Mustang speak with the Führer, who then enters the HQ and kills Romeo Craigin. Winry and the Elric brothers try to speak to Sophie who is vacantly staring out the window not even aware of their existence. They leave Valdora in grief and sorrow.

Mustang and Hawkeye are treated for injuries at the Hospital. At the very end, Norn continually meows trying to get Sophie to come back to reality, and just when hope seems lost, Sophie stresses out the words "Norn" and "Ed" with a smile.

Should the player have given Sophie enough items during the game, a different ending takes place. Norn, as in the normal ending, will meow for Sophie, only this time Sophie comes to her senses. As Ed, Al, and Winry board the train home, Sophie runs to the station with Norn to try and say goodbye to them, only to see that their train has left. In spite of this, Sophie shouts out to the train, thanking them for everything – until it is seen that Ed, Al, and Winry never even got on the train. Upon seeing each other, the four friends embrace in happiness.

== Gameplay ==
Fullmetal Alchemist 3: Kami o Tsugu Shōjo features Tag Battle Mode, unlocking characters such as Roy Mustang, Riza Hawkeye, and Alex Louis Armstrong. In this mode, players can play alone, or with a partner and defeat all of the opponents to gain a record.

Unlike the previous two installations, the game features a two player mode. The player can switch between Edward and Alphonse and play either one of them at any point in the game. In tag battle mode, the same applies to all characters.

Giving items to Sophie will sometimes unlock pictures with small cutscene like dialogue, as well as characters available for tag battle mode, along with the fact that she will sometimes give an item back in return.

Gallery mode has about 96 unlockable images, and 10 movie clips, three of which are the opening, a music video of Nana Kitade's song "Kanashimi no Kizu" (悲しみの傷) and a commercial for the game. To unlock them, the player must give items to Sophie when she is standing in the vacant church. To further experience, upon completing a game, save, and it will be listed as cleared one time. The 10th movie clip is only achievable upon defeating Führer King Bradley.

== Development ==
The game was first announced to be in development in a Famitsu article in May 2012.

On July 21, 2026, the game has an English fan translation released.

== Reception ==
The game sold 46,954 copies by the end of July 2005.
