= Violet Blaze =

Studio album by Nana Kitade
- Released: May 3, 2017
- Genre: Synthpop; dance-pop
- Label: FABTONE Inc. (Japan)
- Producer: Robert de Boron

Nana Kitade chronology
Ai to Hate (2011)	Violet Blaze (2017)	New Dawn (2020)

Singles from Violet Blaze
- 1. "Bad Babe's Dreamer" Released: September 19, 2016

Violet Blaze is the fourth studio album by Japanese singer Nana Kitade, and her first solo album in eight years.

== Release and promotion ==
The first press for the normal edition came with the "Violet Jewel Case". Nana held a release party concert on 3 June titled at Shibuya Mt. Rainier Hall in Tokyo. On 30 March, the jacket of the CD was revealed. Upon its release, the album reached number one on Japan's iTunes chart and stayed there for 3 weeks, becoming Nana's most successful album since 18-.

== Track listing ==
No.	Title	Length
1.	"Make-Believe"
2.	"Saddest Song"
3.	"One Night Story"
4.	"Borrowed Time"
5.	"Canary"
6.	"Bad Babe's Dreamer"
7.	"Nasty Radio"
8.	"Just a Day"
9.	"Violet Blaze" (Instrumental)
10.	"Shed One Tear"
11.	"Shine Drops"
