= Alpha League =

The Alpha League was a high school athletic conference affiliated with the CIF Southern Section. Its members are all independent schools located from west Los Angeles to the valley in the district of Los Angeles, California.

== Members ==
- Brentwood School
- Campbell Hall School
- Paraclete High School
- Sierra Canyon School
- Viewpoint School
- Windward School
- Crossroads School
