= Perfectly Dirty =

EP by The Teenage Kissers
- Released: October 16, 2013 (Japan); October 30, 2013 (Worldwide)
- Recorded: 2013
- Genre: Grunge
- Length: 26:06
- Label: Media Factory
- Producer: Nana Kitade

The Teenage Kissers chronology
Perfectly Dirty (2013)	Virgin Field (2014)

Singles from Perfectly Dirty
- 1. "Ghost Bitch" Released: June 16, 2013

Perfectly Dirty is the debut EP released by Nana Kitade's band, The Teenage Kissers. The EP's first single, "Ghost Bitch", was released physically February 20, 2013, and digitally June 16, 2013. The song "Violent Lips" was used in a commercial for the EP which appeared on MTV Japan starting September 17, 2013. A music video for the song "Black Skinny Bird", directed by Ryoji Aoki, debuted on MTV Japan on September 19, 2013. The EP was released in Japan on October 16, 2013 and internationally on October 30, 2013. Copies of the EP purchased from Tower Records came with a bonus 16 page photo book titled, Out of Control. The EP peaked at #224 on the Oricon albums chart and charted for one week.

== Track listing ==
CD
No.	Title	Length
1.	"Black Skinny Bird"	5:06
2.	"Ghost Bitch"	3:07
3.	"Flower Bed"	3:29
4.	"Violent Lips"	4:25
5.	"Daydreamer"	5:57
6.	"Wendy"	4:02
Total length:		26:06

DVD
No.	Title	Length
1.	"Black Skinny Bird"
2.	"Ghost Bitch"
3.	"Daydreamer"
4.	"Wendy"

== Personnel ==
- Nana Kitade – Vocals, Lyrics
- Hideo Nekota – Bass
- Mai Koike – Drums
- Tsubasa Nakada – Guitar
