= I Love You and Kiss Me =

Single by The Teenage Kissers

from the album Virgin Field
- Released: June 6, 2014
- Recorded: 2013
- Genre: Rock
- Label: Media Factory
- Songwriter(s): Nana Kitade

The Teenage Kissers singles chronology
"Feel Sick" (2013)	"I Love You and Kiss Me" (2014)	"Needle / Crystal Swan" (2014)

"I Love You and Kiss Me" is the fifth single released by Japanese rock band, The Teenage Kissers, and the second from their album, Virgin Field. The single was released digitally on June 6, 2014. The song was previously included as a bonus track on the special edition of the single "Ghost Bitch". The song was used as the opening song for the show Rank Kingdom in June and July 2014.

== Track listing ==
No.	Title	Length
1.	"I Love You and Kiss Me"

== Personnel ==
- Nana Kitade – Vocals, lyrics
- Hideo Nekota – Bass, music
- Mai Koike – Drums
- Tsubasa Nakada – Guitar
