= Windward School =

School in Los Angeles, California, US

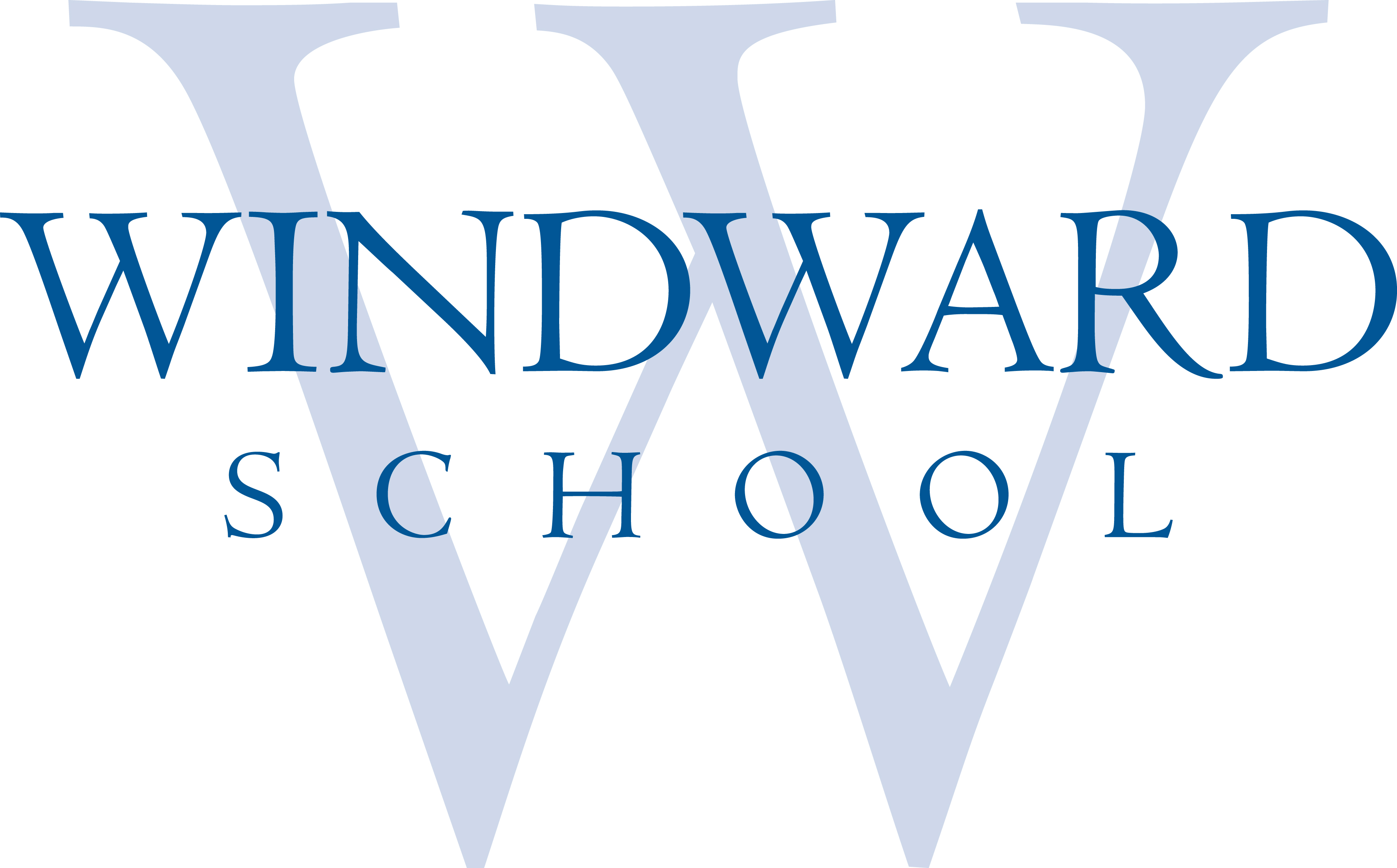

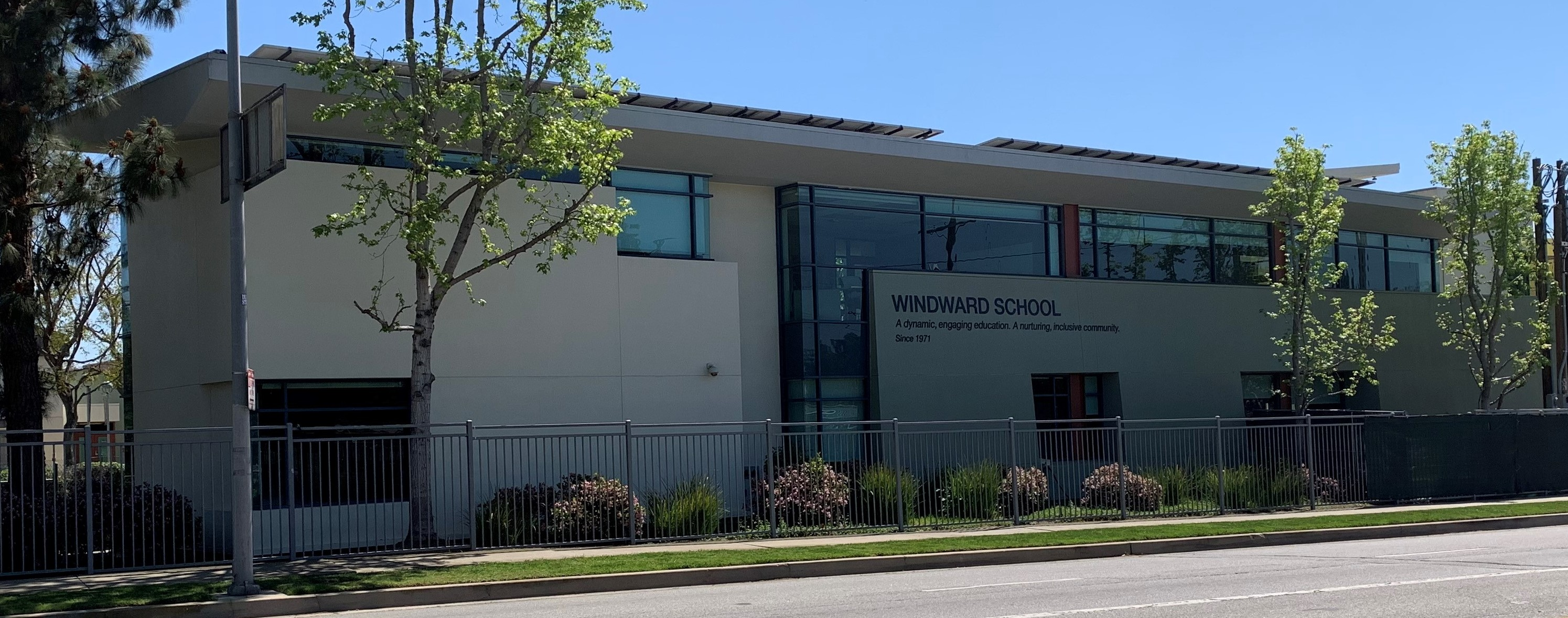

Location
- 11350 Palms Boulevard; Los Angeles, California 90066; United States; 34°01′01″N 118°25′32″W

Information
- Type: Independent
- Motto: "A Dynamic, engaging education. A Nurturing, inclusive community"
- Established: 1971; 55 years ago
- Founder: Shirley Windward
- Head of school: Tom Gilder
- Teaching staff: 78.9 (FTE) (2017–18)
- Grades: 7–12
- Gender: Coeducational
- Enrollment: 625 (2017–18)
- Student to teacher ratio: 7.0:1 (2017–18)
- Colors: Blue and Black
- Athletics conference: CIF Southern Section; Gold Coast League
- Mascot: Willie the Wildcat
- Nickname: Wildcats
- Rival: Brentwood Eagles; Crossroads Roadrunners
- Accreditation: WASC; NAIS; CAIS
- Yearbook: Imprint
- Website: windwardschool.org

Windward School is an independent school in the Mar Vista neighborhood of Los Angeles, California, accredited by the Western Association of Schools and Colleges. It was founded by writer/teacher Shirley Windward in 1971. The school currently enrolls 650 students in grades 7 through 12.

== History ==
In 1971, two former Paul Revere Middle School teachers, Carl Parsons and Shirley Windward (for whom the school is named), founded the school in order to open up their classes to young people on the west side of Los Angeles.

Shirley's husband, Erv Windward, renovated the studios where they lived into classrooms. Many new students volunteered to help renovate the studios. The school originally had fourteen full-time and part-time teachers who taught 65 students in a small building on Wilshire Boulevard.

In 1973, Windward School received its first full five-year WASC accreditation as a college-preparatory institution. As the school outgrew its first facilities the campus moved to 1414 21st Street, Santa Monica in September 1974.

In 2012, Windward's co-founder and namesake, Shirley Windward, died at the age of 93. Windward hosts an event, Founders Day, each year to celebrate Shirley Windward.

Her successor as head of school was Tom Gilder who held the position for 35 years prior to retiring in 2025. Following his departure, Sarah Beck took on the position and is the current head of school.

== Athletics ==
The school has 44 teams, six full-time coaches, 2 full-time athletic trainers, and 30–35 part-time coaches. Sports facilities at the school include the Lewis Jackson Memorial Sports Center, Foley Field, and the neighboring Mar Vista Recreation Center.

The school's athletic teams have won California State Championships in several sports. In 2008, the boys varsity teams won the CIF Division VI championships in both soccer and volleyball. In 2011, both the boys' and girls' varsity basketball teams won the CIF Division IV State Championship. In 2009, the boys' varsity basketball team won the CIF Division V State Championship. In 2012, the boys' varsity volleyball team won the CIF Division III SoCal Regional Championship (the highest level of state competition for boys' volleyball). The boys' varsity 8-man football team won back-to-back CIF Southern Sectional Championships (also the highest level of state competition) in 2010 and 2011. As of 2012, the school has moved up to play 11-man football and no longer competes in 8-man. In 2016, the football program accumulated their first US Army All-American football player, Breland Brandt, who played football for UCLA. In January 2017, the boys football program switched to a hybrid 8-Man/11-Man Football schedule for the 2017 season, (4 11-Man games and 6 8-man games). The 2017 season will be a transition year for the program which will eventually move back to 8-man by the 2018 football season. The reason is undisclosed. In 2017, the Girls Basketball team won the CIF Division I State Championship, their second in school history. In 2018, the Girls Basketball team won the CIF Open Division State Championship. In 2019, the 8-man football team won the 8-man Division 1 championship, and the Boys Basketball team won the Division 1 CIF Southern Section Championship. The Boys Volleyball team was recently moved up to D1/D2 following their undefeated regular season last year(2019/2020/2021) in which the Wildcats continued to the CIF finals.

== Notable alumni ==
- Max Bemis – musician, lead singer of Say Anything
- Jules Bernard – NBA player
- Jordin Canada, WNBA basketball player
- Jakob Dylan – musician, lead singer of The Wallflowers
- Tyler Heineman – Toronto Blue Jays baseball player
- Jenny Johnson Jordan – professional volleyball player and Olympian
- Mason Gooding – actor in Ballers and Booksmart, son of Cuba Gooding Jr
- Zoe Kazan – actress (matriculated to and graduated from the Marlborough School)
- Ethan Kleinberg – professor of history and letters at Wesleyan University, editor-in-chief of history and theory and director of Wesleyan University's Center for the Humanities
- Andrew Luster – heir to Max Factor cosmetics fortune, convicted serial rapist
- Imani McGee-Stafford – 10th pick in the WNBA Draft, has played for multiple WNBA teams
- Darius Morris – basketball player, drafted out of University of Michigan, has played for several NBA teams
- Charisma Osborne - WNBA player for the Phoenix Mercury.
- Shareef O'Neal – UCLA and LSU basketball player, son of NBA legend Shaquille O'Neal
- Anna Paquin – actress, Best Supporting Actress Oscar-winner for The Piano, star of True Blood
- Wesley Saunders – basketball player, former Harvard standout and Vanoli Cremona player
- Jason Schwartzman – actor, star of Rushmore
- Samantha Shapiro – gymnast, six-year member of U.S. National Team, and three-time U.S. elite national champion
- Anthony Stover – former UCLA basketball player
- JuJu Watkins – USC Women's Basketball, transferred to Sierra Canyon High School after her sophomore year
- Malcolm Washington, filmmaker, a son of actor Denzel Washington.

== Demographics ==
According to U.S. News & World Report, 67.8 of the student population is white, and 32.2 percent are minorities, including 7.1 percent Black or African American, 3.3 percent Native Hawaiian or other Pacific Islander, and 3.1 percent Hispanic/Latino. Students identifying as belonging to two or more races make up 18.5 percent of the student population.
