= Feel Sick =

Single by The Teenage Kissers

from the album Virgin Field
- Released: November 10, 2013
- Recorded: 2013
- Genre: Rock
- Label: Media Factory
- Songwriter(s): Nana Kitade

The Teenage Kissers singles chronology
"TYTD" (2013)	"Feel Sick" (2013)	"I Love You and Kiss Me" (2014)

"Feel Sick" is the fourth single released by Japanese rock band The Teenage Kissers and the first single from their studio album, Virgin Field (2014). The single was released in a special physical edition on November 10, 2013, which was distributed only at live shows.

== Track listing ==
No.	Title	Length
1.	"Feel Sick"

== Personnel ==
- Nana Kitade – Vocals, lyrics
- Hideo Nekota – Bass, music
- Mai Koike – Drums
- Tsubasa Nakada – Guitar
- TEAK - Arrangement
