= The Teenage Kissers =

Japanese grunge band

- Origin: Tokyo, Japan
- Genres: Grunge; stoner rock
- Years active: 2012–2016 (on hiatus)
- Labels: Media Factory; Gaze Records
- Members: Nana Kitade; Hideo Nekota; Mai Koike; Tsubasa Nakada
- Website: theteenagekissers.com

The Teenage Kissers is a Japanese grunge band from Tokyo, Japan, formed in 2012 by well known vocalist Nana Kitade, bassist Hideo Nekota and drummer Mai Koike, and later joined by lead guitarist Tsubasa Nakada on April 6, 2013. The band's debut single "Ghost Bitch" was originally released physically February 20, 2013 and was later re-released in digital format through the Media Factory music label on June 16, 2013. The band's first EP, Perfectly Dirty was released October 16, 2013. Their first full-length album, Virgin Field was released July 9, 2014. A single from the album, "I Love You and Kiss Me" was used as the opening song for the show Rank Kingdom for the months of June and July 2014. The band's third EP, Lightning Machine will be released August 5, 2015 through Gaze Records. On May 20, 2016 the band announced they would be going on hiatus to focus on their respective solo projects.

== History ==
=== 2012-2013: Formation and Perfectly Dirty ===
On December 24, 2012 Nana Kitade announced she was forming a new band along with drummer Mai Koike and bassist Hideo Nekota, called The Teenage Kissers.

The band's debut single "Ghost Bitch" was released in a special physical edition February 20, 2013 and was distributed only at live shows. On April 6, 2013, Tsubasa Nakada joined the band as lead guitarist. On June 16, 2013 "Ghost Bitch" was re-released in digital format through the Media Factory music label. The band's second single, "Night Night Night" was released July 5, 2013. The band's third single, "TYTD", was released July 7, 2013. The band's first EP, Perfectly Dirty, was released in Japan October 16, 2013, and internationally October 30, 2013. The EP was well received in Japan as well as overseas. Also the EP is Nana Kitade's first release to receive the Parental Advisory Explicit Content label in its jacket. The EP peaked at number 224 on the Oricon Albums Chart.

=== 2014-2015: Virgin Field and Lightning Machine ===
The band released their fourth single, "Feel Sick" November 10, 2013. On May 9, 2014 the band announced their first full-length studio album, Virgin Field. The band's fifth single, "I Love You and Kiss Me" was released exclusively through the iTunes Store June 6, 2014. The song was previously included as a bonus track on the special edition of the single "Ghost Bitch". The song was used as the opening song for the show Rank Kingdom for the months of June and July 2014. The song became the most successful for the band, peaking at rank 6 on the Japanese iTunes store alternative music category. The band's sixth single, a double a-side vinyl, "Needle / Crystal Swan" was released June 30, 2014. Virgin Field was released July 9, 2014. The album features the previous singles "Feel Sick", "I Love You and Kiss Me", "Needle" and "Crystal Swan" as well as a cover of the song "Sunday Morning" by The Velvet Underground. The album peaked at #242 on the Oricon Albums Chart.

The Teenage Kissers released their seventh single, a double a-side, "Howl / Magical Forest" January 16, 2015 as an exclusive cassette tape available only at the band's One Man Tour. On June 19, 2015 the band announced their second EP, Lightning Machine to be released August 5, 2015 through Gaze Records. The EPfeatures the previous single, "Night Night Night". The music video for "Psychic Haze", a song from the EP, was posted to the band's official YouTube page July 20, 2015.

On September 23, 2015 the band released a double a-side single featuring a remix of "Violent Lips" by Araki of Storoboy and a remix of "Out of Control" by Toru Matsumoto of TRMTRM.

=== 2016-present: Golden Sky and Hiatus ===
The group released their final EP Golden Sky January 21, 2016 to coincide with the start of their Golden Sky Tour. The tour concluded on April 15, 2016. On May 20, 2016 the band announced they would be going on hiatus to focus on their respective solo projects.

== Members ==
Official The Teenage Kissers logo

Current Members

- Nana Kitade – lead vocals (2012–2016)
- Hideo Nekota – bass (2012–2016)
- Mai Koike – drums (2012–2016)
- Tsubasa Nakada – guitar (2013–2016)

== Discography ==
=== Studio albums ===
#	Information
1st	Virgin Field: Release date: July 9, 2014

=== Extended plays ===
#	Information
1st	Perfectly Dirty: Release date: October 16, 2013
2nd	Lightning Machine: Release date: August 5, 2015
3rd	Golden Sky: Release date: January 21, 2016

=== Singles ===
Year	#	Single	Format	Album
2013	1st	"Ghost Bitch"	CD	Perfectly Dirty
2013	2nd	"Night Night Night"	CD	Lightning Machine
2013	3rd	"TYTD"	CD	-
2013	4th	"Feel Sick"	CD	Virgin Field
2014	5th	"I Love You and Kiss Me"	Digital	Virgin Field
2014	6th	"Needle / Crystal Swan"	Vinyl	Virgin Field
2015	7th	"Howl / Magical Forest"	Cassette	-

=== Music videos ===
Year	Video	Link
2013	"Violent Lips"	YouTube
2013	"Black Skinny Bird"	YouTube
2013	"Daydreamer"	YouTube
2013	"Wendy"	YouTube
2014	"Venus Hypnosis"	YouTube
2014	"I Love You and Kiss Me"	YouTube
2015	"Psychic Haze"	YouTube

== Concert Tours ==
- Ripe Tomato Tour (2014)
- One Man Tour (2015)
- Golden Sky Tour (2016)
