= Sakura Pakk =

Anthology OEL manga series

- Cover of Sakura Pakk Vol. 1
- Publisher: (United States) eigoMANGA
- Original run: 2004
- Volumes: 4

Sakura Pakk is an anthology original English-language manga series created and published by eigoMANGA. Sakura Pakk highlights original comics stories created for female comic book readers. Sakura Pakk was released in November 2004.

Sakura Pakk is a spin-off of eigoMANGA's flagship Ameri-manga anthology comic book, Rumble Pak. eigoMANGA heavily promoted Rumble Pak over Sakura Pakk because of Rumble Pak's commercial appeal but Sakura Pakk is largely considered by fans as more popular and sought after than Rumble Pak.

The Sakura Pakk series debuted at the grand opening ceremony of the Apple Store in San Francisco in June 2004. When Sakura Pakk was first conceived, eigoMANGA's editing team couldn't decide on a name for the female-oriented publication. As a result, an online naming contest was organized where fans contributed name suggestions for the publication series. Two individuals from Canada and Texas came up with the same name, "Sakura Pakk". The winners were illustrated in a comic strip featured in the first volume of Sakura Pakk.

In October 2005, eigoMANGA formed a joint-venture with Devil's Due Publishing to publish an ongoing series for Sakura Pak. The publication was re-released by Devil's Due to stores in January 2006.

== Sakura Pakk Versus Rumble Pak ==
In December 2009, eigoMANGA announced an upcoming release of a special graphic novel publication — Sakura Pakk Versus Rumble Pak Graphic Novel — for the first time features a combination of shonen (male-oriented) and shojo (female-oriented) stories from Sakura Pakk and Rumble Pak.

"We honestly never thought about EVER combining Sakura Pakk and Rumble Pak into one", states eigoMANGA's publisher Austin Osueke. "For years everyone of us within our editor to creator teams bitterly wanted to separate both imprints and create distinct identities for them. From time to time there were actually bitter rivalries between the Sakura Pakk camp and the Rumble Pak camps. A local fan asked us to combine our best works into one book. So just for laughs, we put a sample book together and it looked really good. So here we are"[].
