= Virgin Field =

Studio album by The Teenage Kissers
- Released: July 9, 2014
- Recorded: 2013–2014
- Genre: Grunge; stoner rock
- Language: Japanese, English
- Label: Media Factory
- Producer: Hideo Nekota

The Teenage Kissers chronology
Perfectly Dirty (2013)	Virgin Field (2014)	Lightning Machine (2015)

Singles from Virgin Field
- 1. "Feel Sick" Released: November 10, 2013; 2. "I Love You and Kiss Me" Released: June 6, 2014; 3. "Needle / Crystal Swan" Released: June 30, 2014

Virgin Field is the first full-length studio album by The Teenage Kissers. It was released July 9, 2014. The album features a cover of the song "Sunday Morning" by The Velvet Underground.

Three singles have been released from the album: "Feel Sick", "I Love You and Kiss Me". and the double a-side, "Needle/Crystal Swan".

== Track listing ==
All lyrics are written by Nana Kitade; all music is composed by Hideo Nekota, except #10 by John Cale and Lou Reed.

No.	Title	Length
1.	"Halt"
2.	"Damage"
3.	"Feel Sick"
4.	"Rain in My Heart"
5.	"Venus Hypnosis"
6.	"Jellyfish"
7.	"Unicorn Riders"
8.	"I Love You and Kiss Me"
9.	"Needle"
10.	"Sunday Morning" (The Velvet Underground Cover)
11.	"Broken April"
12.	"Crystal Swan"
13.	"Silver Cradle"

== Personnel ==
- Nana Kitade – Vocals, Lyrics
- Hideo Nekota – Bass
- Mai Koike – Drums
- Tsubasa Nakada – Guitar
