= Kibou no Kakera =

Single by Nana Kitade

from the album I Scream
- Released: October 4, 2006
- Genre: J-pop, Rock
- Length: 3:52
- Label: Sony Music Japan
- Songwriter: Nana Kitade

Nana Kitade singles chronology
| "Slave of Kiss" (2006) | "Kibou no Kakera" (2006) | "Antoinette Blue" (2007) |

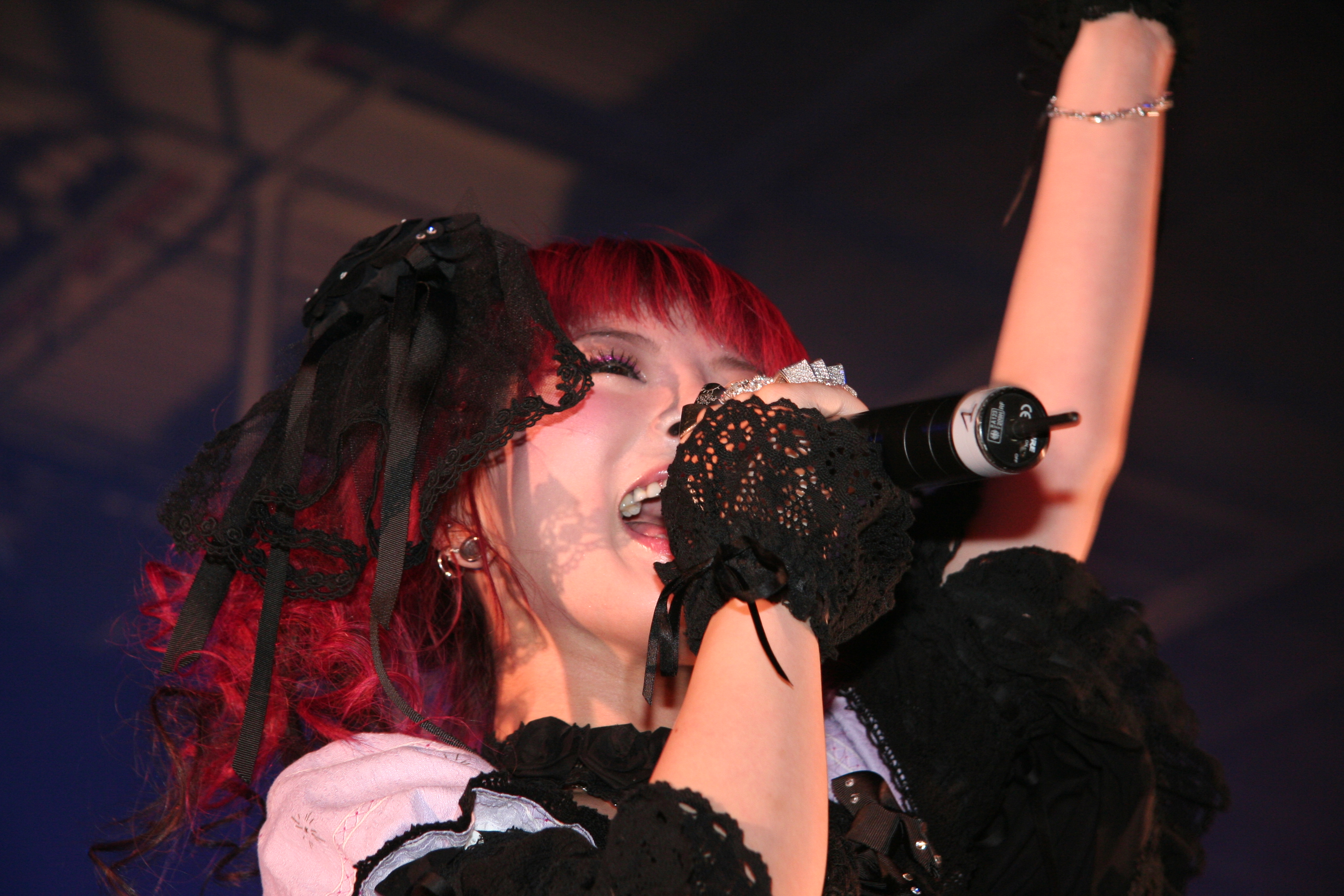
Kitade performing "Pieces of Hope" at the 2007 Japan Expo.

"Kibou no Kakera" (希望のカケラ, Kibō no Kakera; English: "Shards of Hope") is the eighth single released by Nana Kitade, and the second single from her album, I Scream The song gained attention after being featured as the 1st opening song for "Powerpuff Girls Z," which was also featured on the original soundtrack. "Shards of Hope" reached #64 on the Oricon singles chart and charted for 2 weeks.

== Track listing ==
| No. | Title | Length |
|---|---|---|
| 1. | "Shards of Hope" | 4:42 |
| 2. | "This is a Girl" | 3:50 |
| 3. | "Shards of Hope" (Instrumental Version) | 4:37 |

== Music video ==
The music video for "Kibou no Kakera" starts off by showing a stuffed "rabbit", "bear", "panda", and then Nana. It leads up to the animals becoming Kitade's Band and performing throughout the video. At the end of the video, the animals change back into their stuffed form, where Nana is seen holding them.

== Charts ==
| Release | Title | Oricon singles sales chart peak positions and sales | | | | | | Album |
| Release | Title | Daily | Weekly | Monthly | Yearly | Debut | Overall | Album |
|---|---|---|---|---|---|---|---|---|
| 10/04/2006 | " Kibou no Kakera (希望のカケラ)" | -- | 64 | ? | ? | ? | 2,134 Copies | I Scream |
