= I Scream (Nana Kitade album) =

Studio album by Nana Kitade
- Released: December 6, 2006
- Genre: Pop rock; punk rock
- Length: 54:04
- Label: Sony Music Japan

Nana Kitade chronology
Cutie Bunny (2006)	I Scream (2006)	Berry Berry Singles (2007)

Singles from I Scream
- 1. "Kibou no Kakera" Released: October 4, 2006

I Scream is the second studio album by Nana Kitade. It was first released on December 6, 2006 through Sony Music Japan. The album peaked at #150 on the Oricon chart. A special limited edition came with the CD, bonus alarm clock, special socks greeting card, and special Christmas card with a message hand-written by Kitade herself.

== Track listing ==
Regular Edition
No.	Title	Length
1.	"Star Killer"	4:08
2.	"Watashi wa Jigenbakudan (私は時限爆弾, I'm a Time Bomb)"	3:40
3.	"Lum no Love Song (ラムのラブソング, Lum's Love Song)" (Matsutani Yuko cover)	3:09
4.	"Ron Yori Shouko (論より証拠, A Theory of Proof)"	4:25
5.	"Juusan Nichi no Kinyoubi (13日の金曜日, Friday the 13th)"	4:26
6.	"Dark Snow Angel"	5:38
7.	"Sweet Frozen Kiss"	3:44
8.	"Akai Kami no Onna no Ko (赤い髪の女の子, Red Haired Girl)"	3:32
9.	"M'aider (Helping Me)"	4:10
10.	"Kibou no Kakera (希望のカケラ, Pieces of Hope)"	4:45
11.	"Innocent World"	5:05
12.	"Fujiyuu na Asa (不自由な朝, A Morning That is Not Free)"	3:57
13.	"Basket Case" (Green Day Cover)	3:25
Total length:		54:04

== Charts ==
Chart (2006)	Peak position
Japan Oricon Albums	150
