= Suicides Love Story =

Single by Nana Kitade

from the album Bondage
- Released: March 5, 2008
- Genre: Rock
- Length: 5:11
- Label: SMEJ
- Songwriter(s): Nana Kitade
- Producer(s): Yasuhara Hyoue

Nana Kitade singles chronology
"Antoinette Blue" (2007)	"Suicides Love Story" (2008)	"Siren" (2008)

"Suicides Love Story" is the tenth single released by Nana Kitade. It was used as the ending theme for the anime Persona: Trinity Soul. The single reached #64 on the Oricon chart, remaining on the chart for two weeks.

== Video ==
The video for "Suicides Love Story" shows Kitade singing throughout the video. At the end of the video she is supposedly to commit suicide, and is reincarnated as a cherry tree. According to Japanese legend, the price to pay when a person commits suicide is reincarnation as a cherry tree where birds will peck at them for all eternity.

== Track listing ==
1. Suicides Love Story
2. Suicides Love Story: Instrumental

== Charts ==
Release	Title	Oricon singles sales chart peak positions and sales						Album
Release	Title	Daily	Weekly	Monthly	Yearly	Debut	Overall	Album
03/05/2008	"Suicides Love Story"	--	64	?	?	1,652 Copies	2,137 Copies	New Album
