= Rumble Pak (comics) =

Original English-language manga anthology series

- Cover of Rumble Pak vol. 1 (2004)
- Publisher: eigoMANGA
- Original run: 2004–2006
- Volumes: 2

Rumble Pak is an original English-language manga anthology series published by eigoMANGA. Rumble Pak showcases original comics created by artists from around the world including a line-up of original stories written and produced by predominantly independent American comics artists. Rumble Pak is eigoMANGA's first commercial comic book publication and is considered its flagship product. After its release, Rumble Pak rapidly became a recognized Amerimanga publication within the comic book industry.

The first edition of Rumble Pak was released to comic book stores domestically and internationally in February 2004 and the publication was re-released to North American mainstream media stores in October 2004.

Rumble Pak Issue #1 was featured in an exhibition at the San Jose Museum of Art from July through October 2004. Also in October, eigoMANGA launched a rock concert event celebrating the mainstream re-release of Rumble Pak at a Tower Records store in San Mateo, California called Rumble Invasion. The rock band Ludo headlined the inaugural event. Rumble Invasion has become a regular event for eigoMANGA. The December 2005 Rumble Invasion event was hosted by the comic book franchise store "Things From Another World" at two store locations in San Francisco and Universal City.

Rumble Pak spawned a spin-off publication featuring stories catered toward female readers called Sakura Pakk.

In October 2005, eigoMANGA formed a joint-venture with Devil's Due Publishing to publish an ongoing series for Rumble Pak. Volume 2 of the Rumble Pak series was released to stores on April 6, 2006.

== Sakura Pakk Versus Rumble Pak ==
In December 2009, eigoMANGA announced an upcoming release of a special graphic novel publication — Sakura Pakk Versus Rumble Pak Graphic Novel — for the first time features a combination of shonen (male-oriented) and shojo (female-oriented) stories from Sakura Pakk and Rumble Pak.

"We honestly never thought about EVER combining Sakura Pakk and Rumble Pak into one", states eigoMANGA's publisher Austin Osueke. "For years everyone of us within our editor to creator teams bitterly wanted to separate both imprints and create distinct identities for them. From time to time there were actually bitter rivalries between the Sakura Pakk camp and the Rumble Pak camps. A local fan asked us to combine our best works into one book. So just for laughs, we put a sample book together and it looked really good. So here we are".

== See also ==
- List of Devil's Due Publishing publications
