= Ai to Hate =

EP by Nana Kitade
- Released: June 10, 2011 (Japan); July 12, 2011 (Worldwide)
- Recorded: 2010–2011
- Genre: Noise pop
- Length: 24:00
- Labels: Spark & Shine

Nana Kitade chronology
Bondage (2009)	Ai to Hate (2011)	Violet Blaze (2017)

"Ai to Hate" (English: Love and Hate) is the third EP released by Nana Kitade. It was released under the German label, Spark & Shine. It is described as "a mini-album with 5 brand new tracks in which Nana Kitade goes beyond the cultural boundaries of J-Rock, while artistically reinventing herself in the process".

== Track listing ==
No.	Title	Length
1.	"Swallowtail"	5:14
2.	"Ai to Hate" (English: Love and Hate)	2:58
3.	"Gensoumamire" (English: Fantasy Covered)	5:57
4.	"Jabberwocky"	4:26
5.	"Snow Hell"	4:54
Total length:		24:00

== Personnel ==
- Nana Kitade – Vocals, Lyrics
- Taizo – Guitar
