= Tsukihana =

Single by Nana Kitade

from the album Bondage
- Released: February 4, 2009
- Genre: Rock
- Length: 20:00
- Label: SME Records
- Songwriter(s): Nana Kitade

Nana Kitade singles chronology
"Punk&Baby's" (2008)	"Tsukihana" (2009)	"Bad Babe's Dreamer" (2016)

"Tsukihana" ("月華, Moonflower) is the 12th single released by Nana Kitade. It is used as the opening theme for the anime Jigoku Shoujo Mitsuganae. The first press of the normal edition comes with a "Correspondence from Hades "Melancholy Postcard". The limited edition comes in a gorgeous box, and contains a pink straw doll cell phone charm. Track two, "Kagami no Kuni no Aria", is featured in the Japanese release of horror film My Bloody Valentine 3D.

== Music video ==
The music video begins with Kitade walking in a Japanese-styled room. Fully dressed in a kimono, she is seen clutching a deep red flower. As the video progresses, Kitade is shown moving elegantly on the floor, standing up, or holding a red flower in a Japanese-styled tatami room, or in front of a blue screen.

== Track listing ==
No.	Title	Length
1.	"Tsukihana" (月華: Moonflower)	5:03
2.	"Kagami no Kuni no Aria" (鏡の国のアリア: Mirrorland's Aria)	4:45
3.	"Manon" (マノン: Manon)	3:08
4.	"Tsukihana (Jigoku Shoujo Mitsuganae Opening Ver.)" (月華: Moonflower (Jigoku Shoujo Mitsuganae Opening Ver.))	1:35
5.	"Tsukihana (Instrumental Version)" (月華: Moonflower (Instrumental Version))	5:03
Total length:		20:00

== Charts ==
Release	Title	Oricon singles sales chart peak positions and sales						Album
Release	Title	Daily	Weekly	Monthly	Yearly	Debut	Overall	Album
02/04/2009	"Tsukihana"	22	27	--	--	-- Copies	-- Copies	Bondage
