= Kanashimi no Kizu =

"Kanashimi no kizu"

Single by Nana Kitade

from the album 18: Eighteen
- Released: July 20, 2005
- Genre: Rock
- Length: 3:52
- Label: SMEJ
- Songwriter(s): Nana Kitade
- Producer(s): Hiroo Yamaguchi

Nana Kitade singles chronology
"Kiss or Kiss" (2005)	"Kanashimi no kizu" (2005)	"Slave of Kiss" (2006)

"Kanashimi no Kizu" (Scars of Sadness) is Nana Kitade's sixth single. It debuted at #26 and charted for 5 weeks on the Oricon Charts. Kanashimi no kizu was the theme song of PS2 game Fullmetal Alchemist 3: Kami wo Tsugu Shoujo.

== Video information ==
The video feature's Kitade coming outside of a door and playing the guitar. It also features flowers that burn and elements of nature such as snow and heat.

== Track listing ==
1. Kanashimi no Kizu (Scars of Sadness)
2. Call Me
3. Kanashimi no Kizu (Instrumental)

== Charts ==
Release	Title	Oricon singles sales chart peak positions and sales						Album
Release	Title	Daily	Weekly	Monthly	Yearly	Debut	Overall	Album
07/20/2005	"Kanashimi no Kizu (悲しみのキズ)"	--	26	?	?	?	34,050 Copies	18: Eighteen
