= Bad Babe's Dreamer =

Single by Nana Kitade

from the album Violet Blaze
- B-side: "Isolation"
- Released: September 19, 2016
- Recorded: 2016
- Genre: J-pop, alternative rock
- Label: Fabtone
- Songwriter(s): Nana Kitade
- Producer(s): Robert de Boron

Nana Kitade singles chronology
"Tsukihana" (2009)	"Bad Babe's Dreamer" (2016)	"Last Snowdome" (2016)

Bad Babe's Dreamer is the 13th single released by Nana Kitade. The single was released September 19, 2016 during Kitade's Bad Grrrls' Night Out # 1 event. The single was later made available for purchase on her official site. The single was released in a standard edition, as well as a limited edition package containing the single, lyrics card, five postcards, two badges, a guitar pick, a sticker, and a special aluminum packaging.

== Track listing ==
No.	Title	Length
1.	"Bad Babe's Dreamer"
2.	"Isolation"
