= Last Snowdome =

Single by Nana Kitade
- Released: December 19, 2016
- Genre: Rock
- Songwriter: Nana Kitade

Nana Kitade singles chronology
| "Bad Babe's Dreamer" (2016) | "Last Snowdome" (2016) | "Omoi" (2018) |

"Last Snowdome" is the 14th single released by Nana Kitade. The single was released December 19, 2016 during Kitade's Rainer Hall Christmas Live 2016 event. The single was later made available for purchase on her official site. The single was released in two versions. A vinyl version containing only the single, and a limited metal box edition containing the single on CD, a heart-shaped guitar pick, and a Christmas card signed by Nana Kitade.

== Track listing ==
| No. | Title | Length |
|---|---|---|
| 1. | "Last Snowdome" | 4:34 |
