= Bondage (album) =

Studio album by Nana Kitade
- Released: March 11, 2009 (Japan); May 22, 2009 (Germany)
- Genre: Noise pop
- Labels: Sony Music (Japan); Spark & Shine (Germany)

Nana Kitade chronology
Berry Berry Singles (2007)	Bondage (2009)	Ai to Hate (2011)

Singles from Bondage
- 1. "Antoinette Blue" Released: September 5, 2007; 2. "Suicides Love Story" Released: March 5, 2008; 3. "Punk&Baby's" Released: July 23, 2008; 4. "月華-tsukihana" Released: February 4, 2009

Bondage is Nana Kitade's third full-length album, and last release with Sony Music Japan. In its first week, it debuted at #85 selling 1,698 copies.

== Track listing ==
No.	Title	Length
1.	"Kaihou (解放, Liberation)"
2.	"Femme Fatale (ファムファタール)"
3.	"Antoinette Blue (アントワネットブルー)"
4.	"Tsukihana (月華, Moonflower)"
5.	"Death Showcase"
6.	"Ether (エーテル)"
7.	"Under Babydoll"
8.	"Lamia" (Vivace Version)
9.	"Punk&Baby's"
10.	"She Bop" (Bondage Version)
11.	"Suicides Love Story"
12.	"My Dear Maria."

== Release and promotion ==
The album came in two editions, normal and limited edition. The first press for the normal edition came with the first "Nana Original Logo Sticker," and the limited edition came with a DVD containing all single PVs and live footage, "A German Story of Nana," of the time Nana spent in Germany. The live footage featured was the first live footage of Nana released on DVD in 3 years. The album was later released on May 22, 2009 in Germany by the label Spark & Shine, which had already released the previous album "Berry Berry Singles".
