= Cutie Bunny =

EP by Nana Kitade
- Released: July 12, 2006
- Genres: Rock; anison
- Length: 23:21
- Label: Sony Music Japan

Nana Kitade chronology
Slave of Kiss (2006)	Cutie Bunny (2006)	I Scream (2006)

Cutie Bunny is the second EP by Nana Kitade, released July 12, 2006. It mostly consists of opening themes for various anime shows and covers of other artists' songs. The EP peaked at #79 on the Oricon chart. The full title of the EP is "Cutie Bunny: 菜奈的ロック大作戦♥ コードネームはC.B.R.".

== Track listing ==
No.	Title	Note(s)	Length
1.	"Lum no Love Song" (ラムのラブソング: Lum's Love Song)	(Urusei Yatsura theme)	3:11
2.	"Moonlight Densetsu" (ムーンライト伝説: Moonlight Legend)	(Sailor Moon theme)	2:59
3.	"Arashi no Sugao" (嵐の素顔: Face of the Storm)	(Shizuka Kudō cover)	3:26
4.	"You May Dream"	(Sheena and the Rockets cover)	3:45
5.	"Roppongi Shinjuu" (六本木心中: Roppongi Suicide)	(Ann Lewis cover)	5:17
6.	"Bara wa Utsukushiku Chiru" (薔薇は美しく散る: Roses Scatter Beautifully)	(The Rose of Versailles theme)	4:43

== Charts ==
Chart (2006)	Peak position
Japan Oricon Albums	79
