= Nana Kitade =

Japanese singer-songwriter and musician (born 1987)

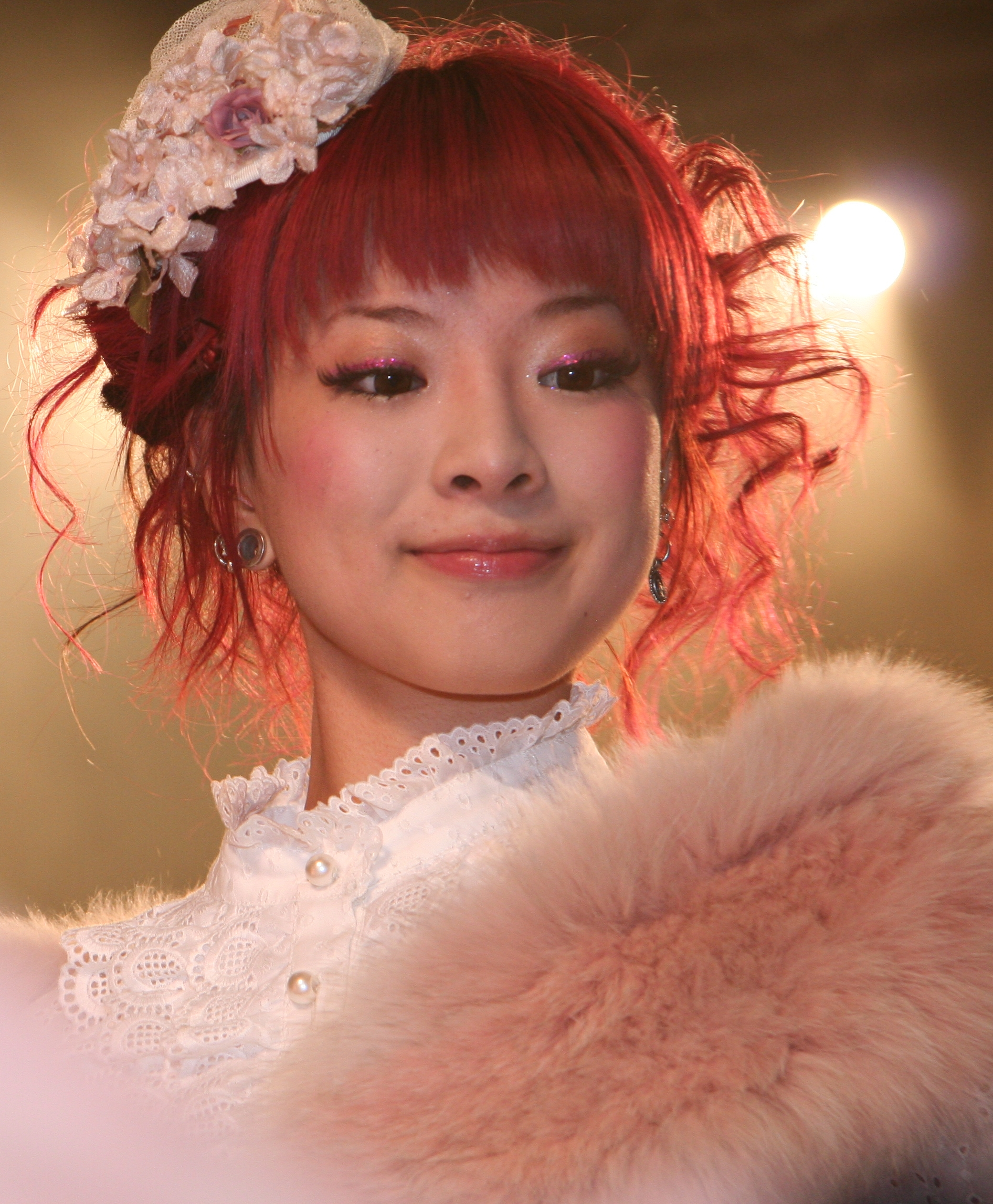
- Kitade in Japan Expo 2007

Background information
- Also known as: Ruby Gloom
- Born: May 2, 1987 (age 39); Sapporo, Hokkaido, Japan
- Genres: Punk rock; noise pop; grunge; synthpop
- Occupations: Musician, singer, songwriter, dj
- Instruments: Vocals, guitar
- Years active: 2002–present
- Labels: Sony Music Japan (2003–09); Spark & Shine (2010–12); Media Factory (2013–present)
- Website: www.nanakitade.jp

Nana Kitade (北出 菜奈, Kitade Nana; born May 2, 1987) is a Japanese singer-songwriter and musician. In addition to being the lead singer of the rock band The Teenage Kissers, she has success as a solo artist, model, actress, and fashion designer. Kitade is particularly known for her songs appearing in various anime, TV shows, doramas and movie opening and endings. Kitade was featured on the cover of the Gothic & Lolita Bible, as well as featured in Neo and Kera magazines. She has toured Asia, Europe, and North America.

== Life and career ==
=== 1987–2001: early life ===
As a child, Kitade wanted to be a singer and/or an anime artist. She started learning the piano at the age of three and wrote her own lyrics at twelve. In junior high school, she became a fan of Ringo Shiina and learned to play the guitar, traveling frequently to Tokyo for singing lessons.

=== 2002–05: debut and 18: Eighteen ===
In February 2002 Kitade passed a Sony Music Japan audition and was chosen as the Sapporo area representative and was given the opportunity to debut as a singer.

In March 2003, the demo which she submitted caught the attention of Susumu Nishikawa, session guitarist and Ringo Shina's sideman at the time of the debut. She signed a deal with SME Records, a subgroup of Sony Music Japan. On October 29, 2003, she debuted with the single "Kesenai Tsumi", which was used as the first ending theme song of the popular anime Fullmetal Alchemist. The single reached number 14 on the Oricon charts and stayed on the charts for twenty-two weeks. With the success of "Kesenai Tsumi", Kitade then released "Kesenai Tsumi: Raw 'Breath' Track", a slower version of the song, which charted on the Oricon charts and peaked at number 87. On November 1, Kitade appeared on the NHK television program Pop-jam.

Her second single, "Utareru Ame", was released February 4, 2004, and peaked at No. 55 on the Oricon singles chart. Her third single was released July 22, called "Hold Heart", which peaked at No. 95 on the Oricon chart. From July 25 to August 15 Kitade had her first tour, touring 7 cities, performing 8 shows. Starting September 30, the song "Pureness" was featured as the ending theme of the anime Beet the Vandel Buster. "Pureness" was released as a single on November 17, and peaked at No. 60 on the Oricon chart.

On June 1, 2005, Kitade's fifth single, "Kiss or Kiss" was released. The song was used as the theme song of the Nippon Television drama Anego, and peaked at No. 11 on the Oricon singles chart, becoming Kitade's highest charting single to date. Her sixth single, "Kanashimi no Kizu", was released July 20 and peaked at No. 26 on the Oricon chart. The song was used as the theme song of PS2 game Fullmetal Alchemist 3: Kami wo Tsugu Shoujo. On August 1 Kitade participated in the 2005 Hong Kong Comic Festival as the first ever Japanese artist to appear.

On August 24, 2005, Kitade's debut album, 18: Eighteen, was released. The album ranked number 16 on the Oricon albums chart. The song "Alice" from the album was used as the image song for the movie Shinku. On August 28, she participated in Bokura no Ongaku Live on the Odaiba Bouken'ou specially installed stage. A part of this was shown to the public on Bokura no Ongaku 2. On September 7, she held her first one-man live show, which was titled Nana Kitade Live Showcase '18: Eighteen', in Shibuya-Ax. On December 7, she released a DVD called Nana Kitade: 18Movies. The DVD consists of all her music videos up until this point, clips from her one-man live show, commercials for her releases, and a studio recording of "Kesenai Tsumi".

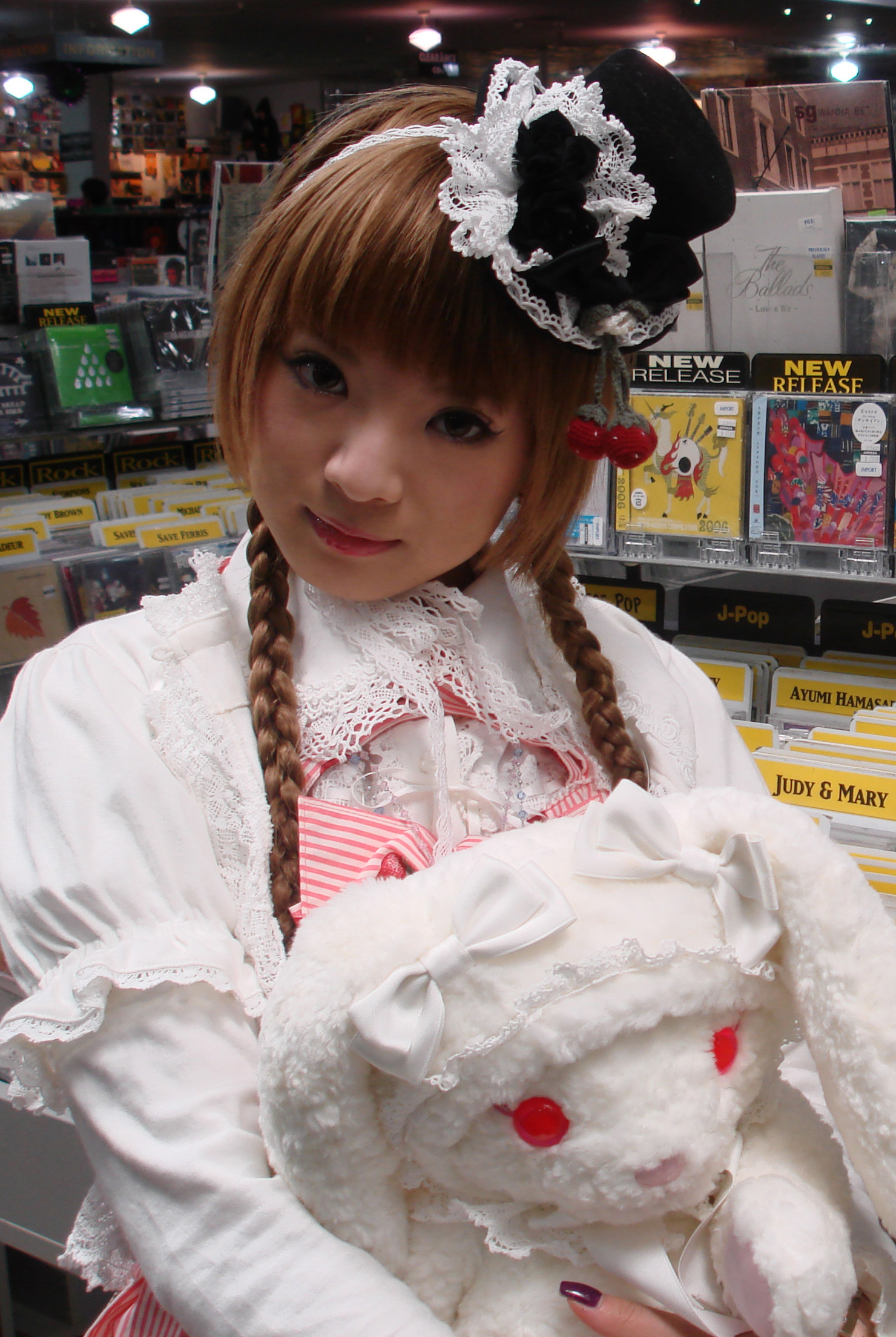
Nana Kitade at Amoeba Music San Francisco, August 2, 2006

=== 2006: Slave of Kiss, Cutie Bunny, and I Scream ===
On February 8, 2006, Kitade released her first EP, Slave of Kiss, which peaked at No. 79 on the Oricon chart. The EP included a cover of the Princess Princess song, "Kiss". The cover also appeared on the Princess Princess tribute album, 14 Princess: Princess Princess Children. Beginning on April 27, 2006, Kitade released 13 songs in a row. These were available exclusively via cell phone downloads, each for 100 yen. Each song was released on the 7th, 17th, or 27th of each month until August 27, 2006. Most of the songs were covers of 1980s hit songs, but a few tracks were new. On June 6 American anime convention Otakon announced that Kitade would be a musical guest for Otakon 2006 in August. 18: Eighteen was released in the United States through Tofu Records on July 11, 2006. On July 12 Kitade released her second EP, Cutie Bunny, which contained six of the released cell phone songs. On August 2, she made an in-store performance at San Francisco's Virgin Megastore and gave her first US radio interview with EigoMANGA's radio program, Shibuya Airwaves. Then, on August 4, she made her first East Coast performance at the Ram's Head Live at Otakon.

On October 4, 2006, Kitade released her eighth single,"Kibou no Kakera", which was used as the opening theme song for the anime Demashita! Powerpuff Girls Z. The single peaked at No. 64 on the Oricon singles chart. On December 6, she released her second studio album, I Scream, which featured a cover of Green Day's "Basket Case".

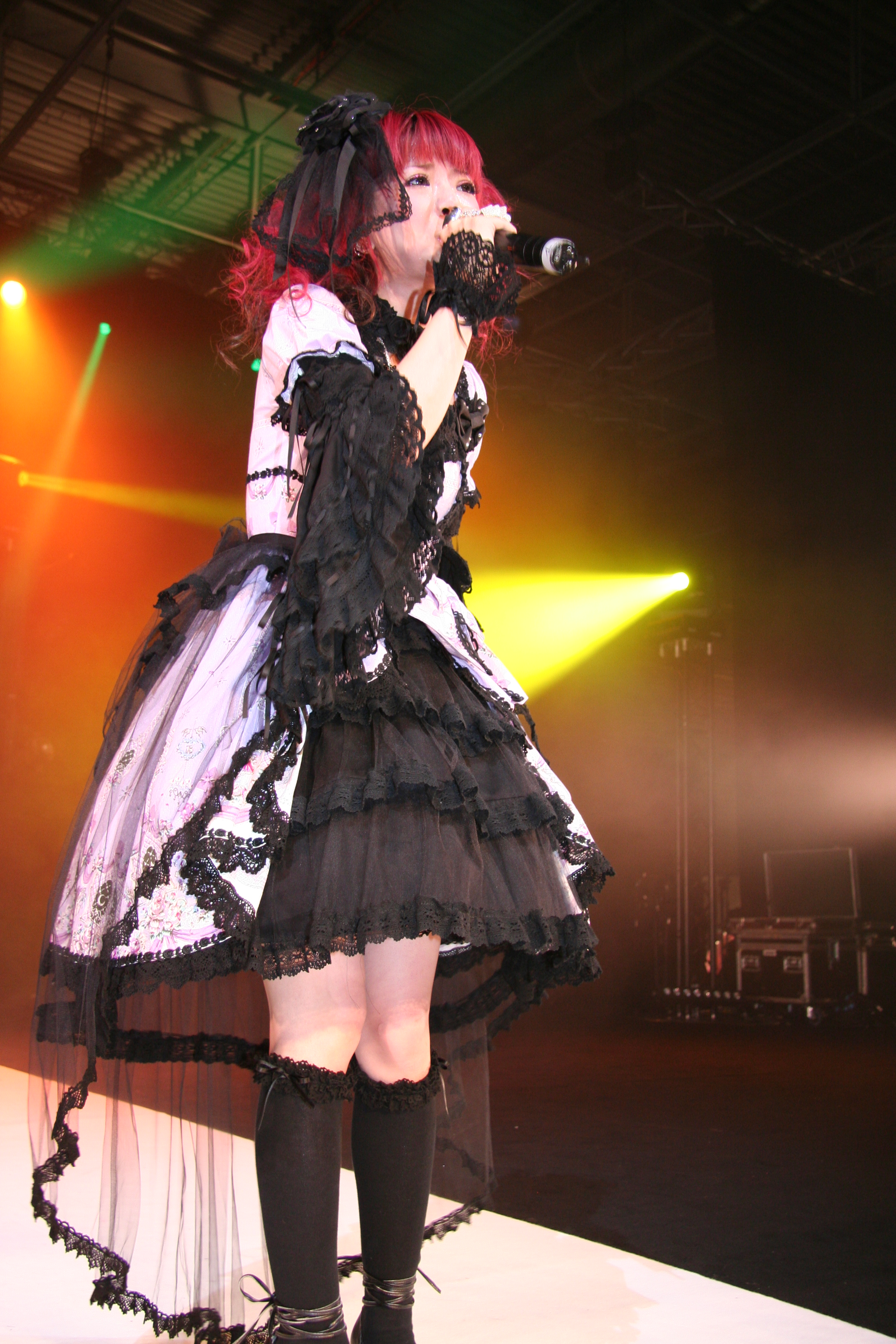
Nana Kitade in the 5th Japan Expo convention in Paris, France

=== 2007–09: Berry Berry Singles and Bondage ===
On July 3, 2007, the song "Antoinette Blue" began being used as the fourth ending theme for the anime D.Gray-man On July 7, Kitade performed at fifth annual Japan Expo in Paris, France. "Antoinette Blue" was released as Kitade's ninth single on September 5. On November 14 she released her first compilation album, Berry Berry Singles.

Kitade's tenth single, "Suicides Love Story" was released March 5, 2008. The song was used as the ending theme to the Aniplex anime Persona: Trinity Soul, and peaked at No. 64 on the Oricon singles chart. On March 26, Kitade released her 11th single, "Siren", under the alias, Ruby Gloom. The song peaked at No. 189 on the Oricon chart and was used as the theme song to the Japanese dub of the Canadian cartoon, Ruby Gloom. Her 12th single, "Punk&Baby's" was released July 23. The song peaked at No. 108 on the Oricon chart and was used as the introduction theme song to the TV program Rank Okoku for June and July 2008. On the same day a tribute album to Cyndi Lauper was released, titled We Love Cyndi – Tribute to Cyndi Lauper, which featured Kitade doing a cover of the 1983 hit song "She Bop". On August 1 Nana Kitade was announced as a musical guest at the 10th AnimagiC convention in Bonn, Germany. Starting October 4, the song "Tsukihana" was used as the opening theme to the Aniplex anime Jigoku Shoujo Mitsuganae.

"Tsukihana" was released as Kitade's 13th single on February 4, 2009. It peaked at No. 22 on the Oricon singles chart. On March 11, 2009, Kitade released her third studio album, Bondage. Bondage peaked at No. 85 on the Oricon albums chart. On May 5, it was announced on Kitade's official website that she had to cancel an upcoming live show due to poor physical health. On June 1, Sony Music Japan announced Kitade was taking a break from all activities.

=== 2009–12: Loveless and Ai to Hate ===
On October 2, 2009, Kitade announced she would begin working on a duo project with Japanese guitarist, Taizo, called Loveless. On October 11 it was announced on Loveless's official site that Kitade's contract with Sony Music Japan has come to an end. Throughout 2010, Kitade toured Tokyo, Japan, promoting Loveless. Due to increased interest and popularity from fans overseas, Kitade released a live video on October 24 of her October 9 performance at Shinjuku Marz. In December, Kitade and Taizo traveled to Germany where Loveless was signed to German-based label, Spark & Shine, and began recording new material.

In 2011, the songs "Little Tears" and "Love. Lust Free" were released on the duo's official Myspace page. Starting April 8, Kitade and Taizo set out on a European tour, titled Nana Kitade feat. Loveless Europe Tour. The tour began in France and ended May 4 in the Netherlands. During the tour, Kitade also performed in Germany, Poland, Austria, Hungary, Croatia, Morocco, the United Kingdom, Portugal, and Spain. On June 10, Loveless released their first (and only) EP, Ai to Hate.

In December 2012 it was announced that Loveless had been disbanded and that Kitade and Loveless had been dropped from Spark and Shine.

=== 2012–2016: The Teenage Kissers ===
On December 24, 2012, Kitade announced she was forming a new band along with drummer Mai Koike and bassist Hideo Nekota, called The Teenage Kissers.

The band's debut single "Ghost Bitch" was released in a special physical edition February 20, 2013, and was distributed only at live shows. On April 6, 2013, Tsubasa Nakada joined the band as lead guitarist. On June 16, 2013 "Ghost Bitch" was re-released in digital format through the Media Factory music label. The band's second single, "Night Night Night" was released July 5, 2013. The band's third single, "TYTD", was released July 7, 2013. The band's first EP, Perfectly Dirty, was released in Japan October 16, 2013, and internationally October 30, 2013. The EP was well received in Japan as well as overseas. Also the EP is the first Nana's EP to receive the Parental Advisory Explicit Content label in its jacket, making this CD the first in her career to have that label on it. The EP peaked at number 224 on the Oricon Albums Chart.

In 2014, THE TEENAGE KISSERS announced their first full-length album, Virgin Field on May 9, with a July 9, 2014, release date. The album consists of 13 tracks, including a cover of Velvet Underground song "Sunday Morning" on May 29, 2014, the band announced their first national tour RIPE TOMATO TOUR. On June 6, 2014, THE TEENAGE KISSERS released a single titled I Love You and Kiss Me exclusively on the Japanese iTunes store, the single quickly rose up the ranks and peaked at rank 6 on the Japanese iTunes store alternative music category.

The band released their fourth single, "Feel Sick" November 10, 2013. On May 9, 2014, the band announced their first full-length studio album, Virgin Field. The band's fifth single, "I Love You and Kiss Me" was released exclusively through the iTunes Store June 6, 2014. The song was previously included as a bonus track on the special edition of the single "Ghost Bitch". The song was used as the opening song for the show Rank Kingdom for the months of June and July 2014. The song became the most successful for the band, peaking at rank 6 on the Japanese iTunes store alternative music category. The band's sixth single, a double a-side vinyl, "Needle / Crystal Swan" was released June 30, 2014. Virgin Field was released July 9, 2014. The album features the previous singles "Feel Sick", "I Love You and Kiss Me", "Needle" and "Crystal Swan" as well as a cover of the song "Sunday Morning" by The Velvet Underground. The album peaked at No. 242 on the Oricon Albums Chart.

The Teenage Kissers released their seventh single, a double a-side, "Howl / Magical Forest" January 16, 2015, as an exclusive cassette tape available only at the band's One Man Tour. On June 19, 2015, the band announced their second EP, Lightning Machine to be released August 5, 2015, through Gaze Records. The EP will feature the previous single, "Night Night Night". The music video for "Psychic Haze", a song from the EP, was posted to the band's official YouTube page July 20, 2015.

The band's final single was released September 23, 2015. It is a double a-side single featuring a remix of "Violent Lips" by Araki of Storoboy and a remix of "Out of Control" by Toru Matsumoto of TRMTRM. On May 20, 2016, the band announced they would be going on hiatus to focus on their respective solo projects.

=== 2016–present: return to solo career and 4th album ===
In September 2016 Nana Kitade returned to her solo career with the release of her 13th single, "Bad Babe's Dreamer". Kitade released her 14th single, "Last Snowdome", December 19, 2016. Nana released her fourth album, "Violet Blaze", on May 3, 2017.

== Fashion and modeling ==
With the 2005 release of "Kiss or Kiss", Kitade revealed her new Gothic Lolita inspired look. She gained the interest of Lolita clothing companies such as Baby, The Stars Shine Bright, of which she has repeatedly stated to be her favorite brand. In 2007 she began appearing monthly prints of Kera Magazine wearing Gothic Lolita styled clothes. In February 2008 Kitade did a cover feature interview for the US edition of Gothic & Lolita Bible. In Europe, Nana Kitade was featured in the 50th Issue of Neo Magazine in August 2008. Kitade was considered a Lolita fashion icon for many teenage girls around the world.

== Discography ==
- 18: Eighteen (2005)
- I Scream (2006)
- Bondage (2009)
- Violet Blaze (2017)

=== As Loveless ===
- Labyrection (2025)

== Tours ==
- Nana Kitade Tour (2004)
- Nana Kitade feat. Loveless Europe Tour (2011)
