= Brentwood School (Los Angeles) =

Prep school in Los Angeles, California, US

Coordinates: 34.061157°N 118.475597°W

- Los Angeles, California; United States

Information
- Type: Private, day, college preparatory
- Religious affiliation: Nonsectarian
- Established: 1972
- Head of school: Tim Cottrell
- Faculty: 124 Full-time; 17 Part-time
- Grades: K–12
- Gender: Co-educational
- Enrollment: West Campus: 300; East Campus: 900
- Average class size: K-5: 50; 6: 70; 7–8: 130-140; 9–12: 130-160
- Campus size: 27 acres (11 ha)
- Campus type: Suburban
- Colors: Red and Navy
- Athletics: 83 Athletic teams
- Athletics conference: CIF Southern Section; Gold Coast League
- Mascot: Eagle
- Nickname: Eagles
- Rival: Crossroads School for Arts & Sciences
- Accreditation: WASC; NAIS; A Better Chance
- Newspaper: The Flyer
- Yearbook: Aerie
- School fees: New student: $2,500; Book deposit: $600; Overnight trips: $300; Retreat fee: $400; Transportation: $1,500; MacBook: $1,100–$1,400
- Tuition: (K–5): $45,495 (6–12): $53,300
- Website: www.bwscampus.com

Brentwood School is an independent, secular, coeducational day school with two campuses located four blocks apart in the Brentwood neighborhood of Los Angeles, California, United States.

== History ==
Brentwood Military Academy was founded by Mary McDonnell in 1902. The school moved sites multiple times under the direction of McDonnell and her family until moving to its final location in 1930. In spring 1972, it was announced that the military academy would not reopen in the fall.

The property was sold by John McDonnell to Terry Leavey Lemons and Walter Ziglar, who soon converted the school to non-profit status. Brentwood School opened in fall 1972 as a college preparatory day school serving Grades 6–10. For the first 5 years, Ziglar served as the President. He was also the chair of the first Board of Executive Directors, which included Bill Badham of Curtis School and Vern Simpson of Montclair Prep. The first headmaster was Richman Grant. Grade 11 was added in 1973, and the school graduated its first Senior class in June 1975. Brentwood School remained Grades 7-12 until 1995 when, under the guidance of Headmaster Hunter M. Temple, the school purchased the Marymount Junior School campus and opened the Lower Division. With the opening of the Lower Division in fall 1995, the school became Grades K-6 on the West Campus and Grades 7–12 on the East Campus. In 2001, the Brentwood School Athletics Complex opened on the East Campus. On December 2, 2011, four new modular classrooms were installed at Brentwood School's East Campus. The classrooms were the first zero net energy classrooms in Los Angeles County. In the fall of 2019, Brentwood School opened a brand new Middle School building allowing its 6th Grade to join the Middle School from the Lower School, and increase enrollment size for each grade on both campuses.

== Overview ==
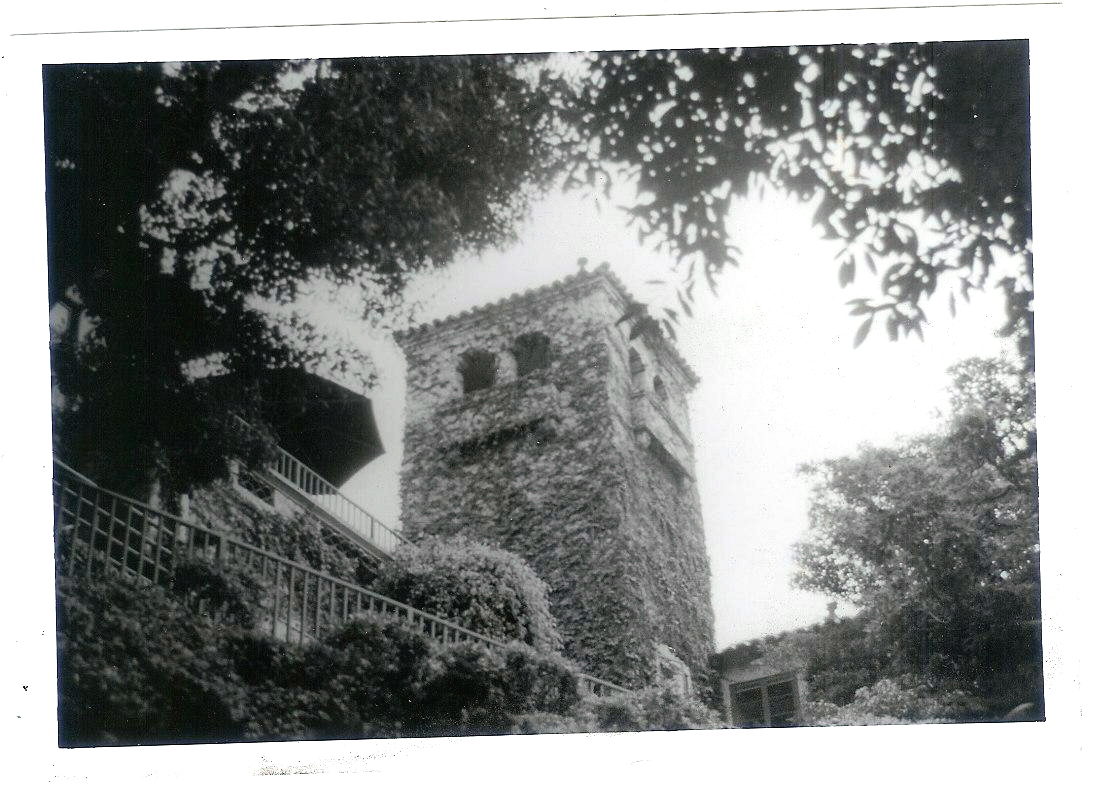
The Brentwood School East Campus Tower.

Combined enrollment on both campuses is about 1,200 students – approximately 900 on the East Campus and 300 on the West Campus. For the 2021–2022 school year, tuition without financial support in the Lower School was $39,350 per year, while tuition in the Middle and Upper Schools were $46,550 per year. The school awards approximately $3,500,000 in need-based financial support each year. Brentwood is a highly selective school, with major admissions entry points in kindergarten, 6th, 7th, and 9th grades, and only limited openings at other grade levels. Admissions decisions are made by a committee composed of faculty and administrators. Brentwood offers a liberal arts curriculum, including over 100 courses each year, including advanced placement courses in 17 subject areas. The school year runs from August 31 to June 10.

== Demographics ==
The Brentwood School community includes students who live in nearly 120 different zip codes. 19% of Brentwood School families receive financial support. In 2021, the school reported that their student community consisted of 46% students of color. In 2016, Brentwood School created an Office of Equity and Inclusion. The school has a diversity council composed of faculty, staff and administrative representatives.

== Athletics ==
Brentwood School fields 83 different athletic teams in grades 4–12. Brentwood School Upper School fields 35 teams in 17 different sports. Students fill about 500 roster spots and work with more than 80 coaches. Approximately 80% of Brentwood's students participate in at least one interscholastic sport. The school primarily employs its own teachers as coaches and requires that students maintain a certain degree of academic standing in order to participate in sports. Brentwood School has a history of hosting the annual Special Olympics Games put on in conjunction with the Special Olympics Southern California Westside Chapter. In 2003, Brentwood-area resident Arnold Schwarzenegger was the Guest of Honor and presided over the Special Olympics Games' Opening Ceremony. Since 1992, the School has also provided a venue for the Peter Vidmar Men's Gymnastic's Invitational, hosted by Brentwood School alumnus, Peter Vidmar. Brentwood School also has a wide variety of e-sports teams.

== Relationship with the Veteran's Administration ==
Since 1972, Brentwood School has supported the Veteran's Administration and veterans through school engagement that includes direct services and student engagement. In 2016, Brentwood School formalized its on-going relationship with a commitment to the VA valued at close to $1.8 million annually in rent and in-kind services.

On August 29, 2013, U.S. District Judge James Otero responding to a lawsuit by the ACLU, ruled that the West Los Angeles Veterans' Administration Enhanced Sharing Agreements that allowed VA land to be leased to Brentwood School, UCLA, and other businesses were not valid As of the start of the 2014–2015 school year, the ruling that the VA must terminate those leases was under appeal to the 9th Circuit Court of Appeals.

The 22-acre athletic complex, built by Brentwood School on VA land, is a shared space known as the VCRE (Veterans Center for Recreation and Education). In addition to being home to Brentwood School athletics, it offers extensive recreational, vocational, educational, and wellness opportunities to veterans and their families.

== Notable alumni ==
- Andrew Breitbart - American journalist and media executive
- J. Anthony Crane - Actor
- Don Diamont - Actor
- David Forst - baseball executive
- Emily Frances - Former news anchor
- Ezra Frech - track athlete and two-time Paralympian
- Talita von Fürstenberg
- Jennifer Grant - Actress
- Jonah Hill - Actor, attended Brentwood School, but later transferred to Crossroads School.
- Jack Quaid - Actor
- Kimberly Ovitz - Fashion designer
- Tra Holder - Basketball player
- Ryan Kavanaugh - Businessman and film producer
- Simon Kinberg - Writer and producer
- Jennifer Landon - Actress
- Jon Landau - Producer of Titanic and Avatar
- Maroon 5, members including Adam Levine, Jesse Carmichael, Mickey Madden, and former member Ryan Dusick - attended Brentwood School while forming the band Kara's Flowers which would later evolve into Maroon 5.
- Sidney Miller - Music producer
- Lorraine Nicholson - Actress
- Antoinette Nwandu - Award-winning playwright
- John O'Brien, a soccer player for MLS team Chivas USA (formerly of Ajax Amsterdam in the Dutch Eredivisie), and on the US national team, attended Brentwood for two years before leaving for Holland.
- Jason Rogers - Olympic medalist
- Fred Savage - Actor and director
- Ben Savage - Actor
- Katherine Schwarzenegger - Author
- Patrick Schwarzenegger - Model, actor
- Azura Skye - Actress, attended Brentwood but later transferred
- Molly Stanton - Actress
- Katy Tur - Broadcast journalist
- Two Friends - DJ/producer duo made up of Eli Sones and Matt Halper
- Peter Vidmar - Olympic medalist
- Casey Wasserman - Entertainment executive and President of the Los Angeles 2028 Olympic Organizing Committee
- Samantha Liber - Artist

== Accreditation ==
Brentwood School is accredited by the Western Association of Schools and Colleges and the California Association of Independent Schools, and is a member of the following organizations:

- National Association of Independent Schools
- California Association of Independent Schools
- A Better Chance
- Independent School Alliance for Minority Affairs
- INDEX
- Private School Village
- Private School Axis
- Young Eisner Scholars
