= Utareru Ame =

Single by Nana Kitade

from the album 18: Eighteen
- Released: February 4, 2004
- Genre: Rock
- Label: SME Records
- Songwriter(s): Nana Kitade Susumu Nishikawa
- Producer(s): Nishikawa Susumu

Nana Kitade singles chronology
"Kesenai Tsumi" (2003)	"Utareru Ame" (2004)	"Hold Heart" (2004)

"Utareru Ame" (撃たれる雨, Striking Rain) is the second single by Japanese rock singer Nana Kitade. It was released on February 4, 2004, by Sony Music Entertainment Japan. The title track was used as the closing theme song to TV Tokyo's Japan Countdown for the month of January 2004. The first press edition of the single came with a mini pin-up poster. The single reached #55 on the Oricon charts and stayed on the charts for a total of three weeks. This single has sold a total of 5,249 copies.

== Music video ==
The music video for "Utareru Ame" shows Kitade recording the song in a dark studio by herself. The video is interspersed with images of rain on glass, flowers, and electronic meters.

== Track list ==
1. Utareru Ame (撃たれる雨, Striking Rain) - 4:00
2. Akai Hana (赤い花, Red Flower) - 4:01
3. Utakata (泡沫, Transience) - 6:15
4. Utareru Ame: Raw "Break" Track - 3:38

== Charts ==
Release	Title	Oricon singles sales chart peak positions and sales						Album
Release	Title	Daily	Weekly	Monthly	Yearly	Debut	Overall	Album
02/04/2004	"Utareru ame (撃たれる雨)"	--	55	1,600 Copies	?	2,821 Copies	5,249 Copies	18: Eighteen
