= 18 (Nana Kitade album) =

18: Eighteen

Studio album by Nana Kitade
- Released: August 24, 2005 (Japan); July 11, 2006 (United States)
- Genres: Pop rock; punk rock
- Length: 55:22
- Label: Sony Music Japan

Nana Kitade chronology
18: Eighteen (2005)	Slave of Kiss (2006)

Singles from 18: Eighteen
- 1. "Kesenai Tsumi" Released: October 28, 2003; 2. "Utareru Ame" Released: February 4, 2004; 3. "Hold Heart" Released: July 22, 2003; 4. "Pureness / Nanairo" Released: November 17, 2004; 5. "Kiss or Kiss" Released: June 1, 2005; 6. "Kanashimi no Kizu" Released: July 20, 2005

18: Eighteen is the debut studio album by Nana Kitade. It was originally released on August 24, 2005 in Japan. The album peaked at #16 on the Oricon chart and charted for five weeks. On September 7, Kitade held a special one-man live show, which was titled Nana Kitade Live Showcase '18: Eighteen', in Shibuya-Ax. The first press editions of the album included a ticket to the live show and handshake event. On December 7, she released a DVD called Nana Kitade: 18Movies. The DVD consists of all her music videos up until this point, clips from her one-man live show, commercials for her releases, and a studio recording of "Kesenai Tsumi". The album was released in the United States on July 11, 2006 through Tofu Records due to increased popularity overseas.

== Track listing ==
Japan Edition
No.	Title	Length
1.	"Kiss or Kiss"	4:00
2.	"Kesenai Tsumi (消せない罪, Indelible Sin)"	4:16
3.	"Rasen (螺旋, Spiral)"	4:12
4.	"Pureness"	3:51
5.	"Hold Heart"	4:02
6.	"Alice"	4:47
7.	"Kanashimi no Kizu (悲しみのキズ, Scars of Sadness)"	4:26
8.	"Utareru Ame (撃たれる雨, Striking Rain)"	4:03
9.	"Fake"	4:30
10.	"Shunkan (瞬間, Instant)"	4:56
11.	"Eighteen Sky"	4:19
Total length:		55:22

U.S. Edition Bonus Track
No.	Title	Length
12.	"Kiss or Kiss" (English Version)	4:00
Total length:		59:22

Notes

- "Utareru Ame" is titled "Break Out" on the U.S. Edition of the album.
- "Kesenai Tsumi" is titled "Guilty" on some rereleases and promotional content.

== Reception ==
=== Charts ===
Chart (2005)	Peak position
Japan Oricon Albums	#16

=== Sales and certifications ===
Chart	Amount
Oricon physical sales	25,000
RIAJ physical shipping certification	-
