= Slave of Kiss =

EP by Nana Kitade
- Released: February 8, 2006
- Genre: Pop rock
- Length: 3:52
- Label: SMEJ

Nana Kitade chronology
18: Eighteen (2005)	Slave of Kiss (2006)	Cutie Bunny (2006)

Slave of Kiss is the debut EP released by Japanese singer-songwriter Nana Kitade, released on February 8, 2006.

"Kiss" is a cover of a Princess Princess song of the same name, and was included on the Princess Princess tribute album, 14 Princess ~Princess Princess Children~. Slaves of Kiss also includes an English version of Kitade's fifth single, "Kiss or Kiss".

== Track listing ==
No.	Title	Length
1.	"Kiss" (Princess Princess Cover)	3:51
2.	"Please Kiss Me"	4:07
3.	"Kiss or Kiss" (English Version)	3:59
4.	"Sweet Frozen Kiss"	3:43
