= EigoMANGA =

American publishing company

eigoMANGA
- Industry: Publishing
- Founded: 2000
- Founder: Austin Osueke
- Headquarters: San Francisco, California, U.S.
- Products: Comics
- Website: www.eigomanga.com

eigoMANGA is a comic book publishing company that produces original Japanese-influenced comics and digital media. eigoMANGA has been underway since its conception in 2000. The company is based in San Francisco, California.

== History ==
eigoMANGA began as a dot-com company founded by Austin Osueke in 2000 that produced webcomics. eigoMANGA was among the first webcomics sites, which helped initiate the trend for other comic book publishers to use the internet as a medium to promote comic books.

eigoMANGA has hosted several anime conventions, the first one, Campus Invasion, being held at the San Francisco State University on May 14, 2004.

In 2005, eigoMANGA formed a joint-publishing partnership with Devil's Due Publishing to extend the circulation reach of its publication line.

On July 18, 2013, eigoMANGA screened the animated film Padak at the Comic-Con International Independent Film Festival. The movie was later distributed on Steam on June 6, 2016.

== Publications ==
=== Rumble Pak ===
Rumble Pak vol. 1 issue 1

Rumble Pak is an anthology comic book series showcasing original comics created by artists from around the world including a line-up of original stories. Rumble Pak is eigoMANGA's first commercial comic book publication and is considered its flagship product. The first edition of Rumble Pak was released to comic book stores domestically and internationally in February 2004 and the publication was re-released to North American mainstream media stores in October 2004.

=== Sakura Pakk ===
Sakura Pakk is a bi-monthly anthology comic book series highlighting original comics stories created for female comic book readers. Sakura Pakk was released in November 2004.

=== Series featured in Rumble Pak and Sakura Pakk ===
Rumble Pak

- Bleed 1.0

Bleed, the meta-organic robot guardian beast who is protecting the innocent, yet mysterious little girl named Ginger. Ginger is targeted by intergalactic assassins because she may have a cosmic bomb activated inside her body. Written and drawn by Bleedman.

- Cool Downbeat

Follow the adventures of two super heroes in training and their coffee-drinking mentor as they defend the weak and punish the bad guys... for a fee.

- Extinction Level Event

An extinction level event occurs when a large number of species die out in a relatively short period of time. This is a story of the last surviving man who suffers in a world where computers are of the highest intelligence and women are in total control.

- God Drug

The C.I.A. subjected a group of low-ranking marines with experimental LSD-like hallucinogen. The experiments failed and created a being with destructive psychic abilities who was driven insane after being held in cryostasis for over 30 years.

- Mega-18

A young woman's tragic childhood past clouded with mystery causes her to lose focus as the pilot for a thermo-nuclear warship. Will she pilot the weapon towards her mission or will she turn on her superiors?

- (The) Monkey Tale

An American teenager discovers that he's the missing piece and the re-incarnation of a living weapon created to prevent the rise of an ancient demon warlord. In order to follow his fate, he must take responsibility for crimes caused by his past life.

- Short Trip

Super Powered Kung Fu Little Red Ridding Hood! Join Mail and Let-Let, the youngest members of Okuru-Ro fighting temple in the misty inland of the Middle Kingdom, as they have their first (and perhaps last...) adventure!!! Furious fighting, deadly frogs, and the almighty allure of FIGHTING SOUP!!!

Sakura Pakk

- (The) Frog Princess

Marine Biologist, Larissa Talcott is torn between a re-newed love relationship with attorney, Brian Liam, because Brian's law firm is representing a company plotting to renovate a local pond into commercial property. Larissa is driven to stop them in order to protect the ecosystem that inhabits the pond; she is given the nickname “Frog Princess” by her friends and colleagues. Will Brian and Larissa compromise their firm beliefs for the sake of their relationship?

- Mid Summer's Dream

A school celebration of Mardi Gras takes Alice, a high school fortune teller, also known to her friends as the “Goddess of Love” back to a midsummer's dream of long ago.

- Natura Morta

Wandering the streets on another sleepless night, Nikki finds the mysterious and silent Diego, and takes him home to tend his wounds. Little does she know that Diego is in hiding from a strange and powerful woman in another realm, and the two worlds will soon collide. The Natura Morta story has many elements of vampirism and gothic themes. Story and Art, Created and Copyright by native Spaniard, Abril Espinosa.

- Warm Rain

Akiko Shinohara relives a time when she was a shy teenager alone in the rain. Suddenly this nice boy walks her home and inspires her to have confidence in herself. This young man mysteriously died many years ago. Is there anything she can do to save the young man who saved her?
