= Kesenai Tsumi =

Single by Nana Kitade

from the album 18: Eighteen
- Released: October 28, 2003
- Genre: Pop, Rock
- Length: 19:00
- Label: Sony Music Japan
- Songwriter(s): Nana Kitade, Susumu Nishikawa
- Producer(s): Nishikawa Susumu

Nana Kitade singles chronology
"Kesenai Tsumi" (2003)	"Utareru ame" (2004)

"Kesenai Tsumi" (消せない罪, lit. "Unfading Sin") is the debut single by Japanese rock singer Nana Kitade. The song was used as the first ending theme in the first Fullmetal Alchemist anime series. The single reached #14 on the Oricon Charts and stayed on the charts for a total of twenty-two weeks, selling a total of 65,525 copies.

== Music video ==
The music video for "Kesenai Tsumi" starts out with the image of a doll version of Kitade, that is being slowly pieced together. Throughout the video are images of pale red flowers, masks floating in a bubbly space and Kitade in a black dress. At the end of the video, Kitade is shown fully human, singing against a blue backdrop with the words "Debut" and "北出菜奈" (Kitade Nana) in white text.

== Track listing ==
No.	Title	Writer(s)	Length
1.	"Kesenai Tsumi (消せない罪, Unfading Sin)"	Nana Kitade, Susumu Nishikawa	4:14
2.	"Shunkan (瞬間, Instant)"	Kitade, Tatsuya Kikuchi	4:54
3.	"Iryuhin (遺留品, Something I Lost)"	Kitade, Nishikawa	4:58
4.	"Kesenai Tsumi (消せない罪, Unfading Sin)" (Instrumental Version)	Kitade, Nishikawa	4:14
Total length:			18:20

== Raw "Breath" Track ==
"Kesenai Tsumi: Raw "Breath" Track" is an acoustic rearrangement of the song. It was released a month after the original "Kesenai Tsumi". The single reached #87 and charted for eleven weeks on the Oricon Charts.

=== Track listing ===
No.	Title	Writer(s)	Length
1.	"Kesenai Tsumi (消せない罪, Unfading Sin)" (～raw "breath" track～)	Nana Kitade, Susumu Nishikawa	4:35
2.	"Shunkan (瞬間, Instant)" (～raw "pain" track～)	Kitade, Tatsuya Kikuchi	4:39
3.	"Kesenai Tsumi (消せない罪, Unfading Sin)" (～raw "breath" track～ Instrumental Version)	Kitade, Nishikawa	4:33
Total length:			13:47

== Charts ==
Release	Title	Oricon singles sales chart peak positions and sales						Album
Release	Title	Daily	Weekly	Monthly	Yearly	Debut	Overall	Album
10/29/2003	"Kesenai Tsumi"	--	14	--	--	12,916 Copies	65,525 Copies	18: Eighteen
11/2003	"Kesenai Tsumi: Raw "Breath" Track"	--	87	--	--	-- Copies	11,913 Copies	18: Eighteen
