= List of Ef episodes =

Ef: A Tale of Memories. regular edition DVD volume 1.

This is a list of episodes of the two Japanese anime television series adaptations of the two-part adult visual novel series Ef: A Fairy Tale of the Two. by the Japanese software company Minori. The first anime adapts the whole first game Ef: The First Tale., and the first half of the second game Ef: The Latter Tale.. The second anime adapts the second half of the second game.

The first anime adaptation entitled Ef: A Tale of Memories. is directed by Shin Ōnuma who volunteered for the job when it was offered, and is produced by the Japanese animation studio Shaft. Katsuhiko Takayama wrote the series composition, Tenmon and Eiichiro Yanagi composed the series' music, and Nobuhiro Sugiyama (Shaft) designed the characters for animation and acted as chief animation director. Akiyuki Shinbo supervised the series. Half of the series was outsourced outside of Shaft: episodes 3 and 8 to Trans Arts; and episodes 4, 6, 9, and 11 to Studio Pastoral. (Note: Outsourcing studios credited as Production Assistance (制作協力) on their respective episodes.) The story follows three protagonists and their interactions with the girls they meet and gradually fall in love with. A short prologue DVD for Ef: A Tale of Memories. was released on August 24, 2007. The prologue is more of a teaser which introduces the characters and some conflict that appears in the first anime series. Ef: A Tale of Memories. aired between October 7, 2007, and December 22, 2007, on the Chiba TV Japanese television network, and was later aired on subsequent networks such as, including but not limited to, TV Kanagawa, TV Saitama, and Sun TV; there are twelve episodes. Each episode ends with a still image drawn by Japanese illustrators of anime, manga, and visual novels. The episode titles are originally written in English and as such there are no Japanese language equivalents. The first letter in each episode's title, plus the "coda" title of the last episode, can be brought together to form "Euphoric Field". The series was released in six limited and regular edition DVD compilations, each containing two episodes. The first DVD volume was released on December 7, 2007, and the sixth DVD was released on May 9, 2008.

The second anime adaptation entitled Ef: A Tale of Melodies. is produced by the same staff as with the first series, and contains the same cast of voice actors. Eight of its episodes were outsourced outside of Shaft: episodes 2, 5, 9, and 11 to Studio Pastoral; episode 3 to Trans Arts; episodes 4 and 8 to A.C.G.T; and episode 7 to Silver Link. Ef: A Tale of Melodies began airing in Japan on October 7, 2008, on TV Kanagawa. Very much like the first season, the first letter in each episode's title reveals a hidden meaning. The first six episodes spell out the word "future" backwards with the following six episodes having the prefix "re-" attached to five of the first six episode titles, but introduced in reverse. For example, episode six is entitled "flection" and episode seven is titled "reflection". For episode twelve, the title is "forever".

Ef: A Tale of Memories. uses four pieces of theme music for the episodes, one opening theme and three ending themes. The opening theme, starting with episode three, is the English version of "Euphoric Field" by Tenmon featuring Elisa. The first episode uses a background music track for the opening theme, and the second and tenth episodes have no opening theme; "Euphoric Field" was also used for the ending theme in episode two. The Japanese version is used as the opening theme for the twelfth episode. The first ending theme is "I'm here" by Hiroko Taguchi which is used for episodes one, three, seven, and ten. The second ending theme, "Kizamu Kisetsu" (刻む季節, Carving Season) by Junko Okada, is used for episodes four, five, and nine. The third ending theme, "Sora no Yume" (空の夢, Sky's Dream) by Natsumi Yanase, is used for episode six, eight, and eleven, though the second verse of the song was used in that episode. A remix of the visual novel's theme song called "Yūkyū no Tsubasa" 07.mix (悠久の翼 07.mix, Eternal Feather 07.mix) sung by Yumiko Nakajima is used as the ending theme in episode twelve.

The opening theme of Ef: A Tale of Melodies. is the English version of "Ebullient Future", also by Tenmon featuring Elisa, with the sixth episode featuring the instrumental version. The first ending theme is called "Egao no Chikara" (笑顔のチカラ, Strength of Smiles) by Mai Goto while the second is called "Negai no Kakera" (願いのカケラ, Pieces of Wish) by Yumiko Nakajima. A new version of the opening sequence of the first season was inserted in the middle of episode eleven. The song "A moon filled sky." was featured right after the ending of the same episode with the German translated lyrics that had been shown throughout the whole series with each of the words' own numberings.

== Ef: A Tale of Memories. ==
No.	Title	Directed by (Note: Information is taken from the ending credits of each episode.)	Storyboarded by	Original release date
1	"eve"	Shin Oonuma	Shin Oonuma	October 7, 2007
Renji Aso meets Chihiro Shindo at an abandoned train station one day after school, and returns to the same station several days in a row to see her again, finally declaring friendship with her on the third day. Kyosuke Tsutsumi is out with his girlfriend on Christmas night when he is distracted by Kei Shindo running down the street, but a passing truck spoils his shot. On his way to Kei's Christmas party, Hiro Hirono stops at a church to do research, where he is surprised to see Yuko Amamiya, then Miyako Miyamura rides off on his bike in pursuit of a purse snatcher. In the same church, Renji asks Yu Himura for career advice and is told to follow his passion. Miyako winds up spending the night with Hiro after crashing his bike and knocking herself out, and Hiro never makes it to Kei's party.
2	"upon a time"	Shin Oonuma	Akiyuki Shinbo (Note: Credited as Souji Homura.)	October 14, 2007
Chihiro tells Yu and Kei about Renji. Kei wakes Hiro and forces him to get up and go to school. While ditching classes, Hiro runs into Miyako again, and finds out that they are in the same year at the same school, though in different classes. He tells her that the reason why he does not attend classes much is that he is already an established manga author. Kyosuke continues to ponder over the brief shot he got of Kei running through the city on Christmas, though he does not recognize her. Renji meets again with Chihiro and becomes closer with her. He eventually finds out from her that she has a memory defect where she cannot remember anything past thirteen hours previous.
3	"paradox"	Kenichi Matsuzawa	Ryouki Kamitsubo	October 21, 2007
Renji continues to meet with Chihiro every day after school, though he wonders if he should continue with such a half-hearted attitude. It rains one day after school, so Renji does not go to meet Chihiro, thinking that she would not come under the circumstances, but she comes anyway and manages to catch a cold, something Renji feels terrible about later on. Hiro goes out during school with Miyako into town and they have lunch at a café. After Hiro accidentally forgets her given name, Miyako leaves him behind at the café. Kyosuke quits the film club, and even breaks up with his girlfriend.
4	"honesty"	Ryouki Kamitsubo	Yoshihiro Mori	October 28, 2007
Renji sees Chihiro for the first time after she gets over her cold and apologizes for not coming last time. Renji asks her if she would like to write a novel with him, as she had said earlier that it was her dream to write one, but Chihiro gets very defensive and angry at his request. After talking with her more on the issue, Chihiro finally gives in to his persistence. Kyosuke sees Kei again in town and finally realizes she was the one he filmed on Christmas. Hiro meets with Miyako in town and she goes back to his place while he works on his manga. Miyako reads some of Hiro's manga, and as an act to show her gratitude, she cooks food for him. Kei walks in on them together, and runs off.
5	"outline"	Masayuki Iimura	Keizō Kusakawa	November 4, 2007
Renji brings Chihiro to his home where she meets his mother Sumire Aso and his neighbor Shuichi Kuze, though she has merely forgotten the latter many times over. After they eat, Chihiro gives Renji a notebook with her notes for her novel which he reads after she leaves for the day. He finds that the novel is rather depressing and representative of Chihiro's life. At school, Kei tries to get Miyako to leave Hiro alone so he will not have to repeat a year of school, but Miyako talks down to her the entire time. Kyosuke films Kei in the morning while she is taking a basketball shot, and she punches him in the gut for filming her without permission. He later asks her to go out with him via Hiro's help.
6	"rain"	Shuuji Miyazaki	Shuuji Miyazaki	November 11, 2007
It turns out that Kyosuke asking Kei out was a ploy on his part as a lead in to ask her if she wanted to star in an amateur film he is making for an upcoming film festival. Hiro and Kyosuke get into an argument over the differences between being a professional and an amateur, however Kei interjects in her indecision on whether or not to be cast in Kyosuke's film. Later, Kei informs Miyako in an intense discussion that Miyako will eventually disappear from Hiro's heart. On Sunday, Kei gets hurt at the basketball match, and Hiro ignores his date with Miyako in order to make sure Kei was all right. Meanwhile, Chihiro continues to write her novel, and Renji helps her by borrowing a uniform from Kuze so that they can enter the school's library to research materials for the novel.
7	"I..."	Shin Oonuma	Shin Oonuma	November 18, 2007
Renji and Chihiro continue work on the novel at his school's library and they manage to nearly complete it. Afterwards, the two take a walk on the beach and Chihiro suddenly asks Renji if he wants to kiss her. This seemingly simple act throws Renji off balance and says that their relationship is not like that, which causes her to run away in tears. Renji breaks down, hoping she will not write down what just happened in her diary. The story shifts to a flashback of when Miyako was waiting for Hiro to show up for their date in the previous episode. Miyako continues to send him voice messages on his cell phone, first being angry for him not showing up, but later becoming increasingly desperate with each call as she does not want Hiro to ignore her. The story shifts back to the present in Hiro's room, with Hiro and Kei together. After Hiro leaves his room to get food, Kei discovers Miyako's messages before Hiro learns of their existence, and promptly deletes them, as she vowed to erase her from his memories.
8	"clear colour"	Daisuke Takashima	Keizō Kusakawa	November 25, 2007
Frustrated that none of her voice messages made it through to Hiro, Miyako tossed her cell phone into a nearby fountain the night he stood her up. Hiro tries to call her repeatedly, but could not get through due to this. Miyako later calls him on a public phone and is reassured that Kei lied to her when she said Miyako had already disappeared from Hiro's heart. Renji and Chihiro continue work on the novel, and Chihiro is pushing herself with stress and lack of sleep so as to prolong her memories. She eventually collapses and is unconscious for over thirteen hours. When she finally awakes, Renji witnesses Chihiro's frantic state of not understanding why she has grown older or what happened to her left eye.
9	"forget me not"	Yoshihiro Mori	Hiroyuki Shimazu	December 1, 2007
Renji continues to stay with Chihiro despite the pain he feels and manages to smile when around her. Chihiro rereads her diary three times and eventually comes to act like the person described in her diary, but she thinks that person is already dead. After hearing this, Renji vents his frustration and continuously repeats that this is not true. Hiro finds Miyako at a public telephone booth in town and after a stroll on the beach where they kiss, Hiro takes her back to his place where they make love. The following morning, Kei finds Miyako in Hiro's bed, which causes her to run away in tears, eventually collapsing on the road as Kyosuke rushes up to her with his bike.
10	"I'm here"	Kenichi Ishikura; Masato Kitagawa (Note: Assisted by Toshimasa Suzuki.)	Kenichi Ishikura	December 8, 2007
Kyosuke confronts Hiro about what happened with Kei, telling him that he always does things halfway. Miyako calls Hiro to tell him that it is too painful to be with him since she does not want to be eventually forgotten by him. Hiro goes to see Kei and is able to come to an understanding with her, even though he is in love with Miyako. Right before she is going to leave town, Miyako calls Hiro one last time. The calls cuts out at a pivotal moment, which leads Hiro to rush out on his bike, managing to find her at a public telephone booth near a church where they kiss.
11	"ever forever"	Shuuji Miyazaki	Shuuji Miyazaki	December 15, 2007
Chihiro finishes her novel and wants Renji to read it, though she does not want to be around when he does. Renji proposes they go out on a date, which Chihiro happily agrees to, though she promises Renji that they will become lovers for only one day. After their date, Renji confesses his love to her once again on the school rooftop, and shortly after they make love while still on the rooftop. Later that night, Chihiro gives Renji the novel to read, and she goes up to the school rooftop to wait for him to finish. After realizing the bleak ending of the novel, Renji runs up to the balcony to meet Chihiro, though she tells him that they should break up while she can still love him with all her heart. Chihiro throws all her diary pages containing accounts of Renji into the air, effectively forcing Renji to break up with her.
12 / Coda	"love" / "dream"	Shin Oonuma	Shin Oonuma	December 22, 2007
Renji reflects over his past memories with Chihiro and is still very depressed over what happened with Chihiro throwing away her diary entries that contained accounts of Renji. After talking with Yu and Kuze, Renji starts collecting the missing diary pages; he only manages to find a handful of them. He takes them to the train station where he and Chihiro first met and finds her still sitting there. Renji discovers that Chihiro has not forgotten about him since she could not stop thinking about him for thirteen hours. Renji promises that they will always be together. The rest of the story concludes with showing scenes between Renji with Chihiro, Hiro with Miyako, and Kyousuke with Kei. Yuko finally reunites with Yu at the old church.

== Ef: A Tale of Melodies. ==
No.	Title	Directed by	Storyboarded by	Original release date
1	"ever"	Shin Oonuma	Shin Oonuma; Nobuyuki Takeuchi	October 7, 2008
A flashback is shown with Yu Himura, Yuko Amamiya, and Shuichi Kuze in their younger days as high school students. At this time, Yu and Yuko have not seen each other for ten years. In the present day, Mizuki Hayama is staying over at Renji Aso's house for the time being until she enters high school, not having much to do while Renji studies for exams. Sumire Aso introduces Shuichi to Mizuki, who discovers some of the things Renji was trying to warn her about him might be true. Kuze and Mizuki spend the rest of the day together, and the two become more familiar with each other.
2	"read"	Yoshihiro Mori	Yoshihiro Mori	October 14, 2008
Yu and Yuko originally met at an orphanage twenty years prior. Yu had lost his younger sister Akane Himura in a fire, and he continued to be troubled by it for years. Once in high school, Yuko confesses that Yu was her first love, and she still loves him. In the present, Mizuki comes over to Kuze's house, and he helps her with some laundry. Kuze later collapses in Mizuki's presence, and she makes sure that he is comfortable while he sleeps it off. That night, Mizuki comes over again because she cannot sleep and tells him how touched she was after listening a recording of his violin performance he gave her. Before she leaves, she tells him that she has fallen in love with him.
3	"union"	Hodaka Kuramoto	Nobuyuki Takeuchi	October 21, 2008
In the past, Yuko is going through some "medium-level" bullying as she calls it, but while she does not think anything of it, Yu is very concerned about it. He even asks Kuze to keep an eye on Yuko when she is in class. In the present, Mizuki goes to Kuze's house, but he does not answer, causing her to think he is somewhere else and avoiding her. Mizuki goes to the old train station and talks with Chihiro Shindo and learns that Kuze will die soon due to a rare form of neurosis. That night, Chihiro tells her that Kuze is at the beach playing the violin, and she runs to the shore to meet him. Kuze attempts to light his violin and its case on fire, but Mizuki manages to put it out in time, though not before burning her right palm.
4	"turn"	Susumu Kudou	Masahiro Sonoda; Kouhei Hatano	October 28, 2008
In the past, Yu and Yuko go out together to buy new boots for Yuko, and while Yu does not consider this a date, Yuko and her elder brother Akira Amamiya do; after Nagi Shindo catches wind of this, she confronts Yu about it. In the present, Nagi helps Hiro Hirono draw his manga in order to beat the deadline, and Miyako Miyamura makes dinner for him. Mizuki gets a cold and Kuze comes to pay her a visit. After she gets better, the two go out to the surrounding countryside and spend the rest of the day together with Kuze resting his head on Mizuki's lap. Kuze tells her that before he dies he wants to end all relationships, and even though he too has come to love Mizuki, he tells her to never appear before him again.
5	"utter"	Shuuji Miyazaki	Shuuji Miyazaki	November 4, 2008
In the past, Yuko continues to go through being bullied, and this time she fights back, but gets injured in the process. Yu starts worrying about her more, and is angered that Akira does nothing to help Yuko. In the present, Kei has a talk with Kyosuke Tsutsumi about Chihiro, and he suggests that she go and visit her. When they meet again for the first time in five years, they make amends with the past, and reflect on their futures with those they love. Mizuki wants to be stronger like Chihiro and Kei, but does not know how. When Mizuki expresses this doubt to Nagi, the latter reveals that she is in fact going out with Kuze.
6	"flection"	Shin Oonuma	Tomoyuki Itamura; Kouhei Hatano	November 11, 2008
In the past, Yu finally comes to terms with his love for Yuko, but must turn down Nagi first. After Kuze plays his violin for Yu and Yuko, Yuko starts crying because the music is so beautiful and runs out of the room; Yu chases after her to the school rooftop. There, Yu professes full devotion to Yuko, and she finally reveals to him what she has been hiding this whole time. Akira has been physically and sexually abusing Yuko for years, and she infers that this could have all been avoided had Yu merely said he wanted a younger sister back when they were at the orphanage together.
7	"reflection"	Jun Fukuta	Hiroyuki Shimazu	November 18, 2008
In the past, Yuko reveals to Yu a knife she always carries given to her by Akira if she wanted to kill him. Yu takes the knife and confronts Akira, but Yu does not go through with it, and gets beaten up. In the present, Mizuki seeks advice from Kei and Yu on how to approach Kuze, but when she goes to his house, he acts very negatively towards her, and berates her with many questions. After she leaves, Kuze experiences intense chest pains, and after struggling with his pills, and managing to break the bottle open, he takes some of the pills and recovers from the attack while saying he still wants to live.
8	"reutter"	Masahiro Sonoda	Hiroyuki Shimazu	November 25, 2008
In the past, Yu and Yuko run away together and eventually find a place to stay while Yu works. Yu runs into Akira one day and Yu stays out late that night thinking about what he said to him which causes Yuko to worry and go out looking for him. Yuko runs into Akira and he asks her if she wants to go home, and she nods in agreement. In the present, Yu and Nagi talk with Kuze, and try to make him see reason, but he only serves to get Yu and Nagi angry at him for what he says. Nagi tells Mizuki that she is probably the only one left who can save Kuze.
9	"return"	Kenichi Ishikura	Yoshihiro Mori	December 2, 2008
In the past, Yuko is back at school while Yu is still missing. Both of them realize their love for each other, and are helplessly in love. At home, Akira goes on a rampage and throws Yuko onto the wall, where Yu intervenes and is beaten by Akira. Then Akira takes a look at Yu's sketchbook and takes it with him into his room, where he goes insane and starts drawing his deceased sister. He burns the drawings along with himself. In the present, Mizuki receives charms from Chihiro and Kei, which are keys to the school rooftop. Kuze realizes that he wants to live and that now he is all alone.
10	"reunion"	Shin Oonuma	Nobuyuki Takeuchi; Shuuji Miyazaki; Tomoyuki Itamura	December 9, 2008
In the past, Yu and Yuko are now living together again. Yu is getting drawing lessons from Nagi. Yuko meets an orphaned girl named Miki, who was intended to commit suicide with her parents. Soon, Yuko and Miki become friends. Miki meets the young Kuze, and he gives her his green ribbon, which he uses to tie a side ponytail on her. Yu and Yuko decide to meet after Yu's work on Christmas, but before Yu gets there, Yuko gets into a car accident. By the time Yu and Miki arrive, Yuko is already dead. Yu remembers that Yuko gave him the key to the school rooftop to keep for safe keeping, and how she said to give it to anyone who is sad or lonely.
11	"reread"	Shuuji Miyazaki	Shuuji Miyazaki	December 16, 2008
In the present, Kuze receives a letter of challenge from Mizuki which draws him out of his home to the school rooftop to meet Mizuki. Through her professing words of love to Kuze, he finally gives in and wants to stay in love with Mizuki, but his heart gives out again. Mizuki receives emotional support from Kei and Chihiro during this time. Kuze decides to undergo the risky surgery to try to live longer with Mizuki.
12 / Fine	"forever" / "ef"	Shin Oonuma	Hiroyuki Shimazu	December 23, 2008
Everyone is spending time with their loved ones during Christmas, whether in Japan or Australia. Kuze survived the surgery and continues to live on with Mizuki. Yu hears from Nagi that Hiro said he talked with Yuko, and Yu heads back to Japan to meet up with her in the church. The two spend the rest of the night together, first at the church, and then at the school rooftop to watch the sunrise. Yu and Yuko say their goodbyes and Yuko disappears, leaving behind a white feather. In Australia, Yu is seen talking with Mizuki about the cities of Otowa, and how Yu has a new goal in life.
