= Eden* =

2009 video game

- Eden* original visual novel cover.
- Manga
- Written by: Yū Kagami
- Illustrated by: Takeshi Moriki
- Published by: Ichijinsha
- Magazine: Comic Rex
- Original run: August 2009 – March 2010
- Volumes: 1
- Video game
- Developer: Minori
- Publisher: Minori, MangaGamer
- Genre: Eroge, Visual novel
- Platform: Windows
- Released: JP: September 18, 2009; WW: January 30, 2015

Eden* is a Japanese visual novel by Minori for Windows playable as a DVD and was released on September 18, 2009, with a rating for everyone. An updated adult patch of the game titled Eden* Plus+Mosaic was released on the same day. Other games by Minori include Wind: A Breath of Heart and Ef: A Fairy Tale of the Two. A manga adaptation illustrated by Takeshi Moriki was serialized in Ichijinsha's Comic Rex magazine. An English version by MangaGamer was released on Steam on January 30, 2015.

== Plot ==
In the far future, a huge mass of energy suddenly appears near Mars, which causes unusual natural phenomena. As a result, wars and terrorism occur all over the world. The Earth only has a hundred years left because of the damage. In order to avoid extinction, mankind creates two plans to escape from Earth. One is to form the World Integrated Government to gather resources and suppress antis. The other is called the "Felix plan". Humans need new technologies to travel to outer space and migrate to other planets, so they create a new species called Felix by manipulating genes. Felix are humans with high intelligence and immortal bodies. Ninety-nine years later, a Felix girl named Sion who devotes her whole life to humans' plans has accomplished all her tasks and decides to stay on Earth for the rest of her life. Then a boy, Ryō Haruna, is sent to protect her, as well as restrict her freedom.

== Characters ==
=== Main characters ===
Ryō Haruna (榛名 亮, Haruna Ryō)
Voiced by: Junji Majima, Kiya Sugi (Plus+Mosaic)
Ryō is the protagonist of the story. He was abandoned by his parents because of the global chaos. He used to live in mountains and joined the army in an incident. He becomes an excellent soldier and has a successful career within the special force. After the wars, he is assigned to be Sion's bodyguard.

Sion (シオン, Shion)
Voiced by: Yumi Shimura, Yōko Tange (Plus+Mosaic)
Sion is a Felix girl also known as the "savior of humanity". She is 100 years old but with a teenage-girl appearance. She has the highest intelligence among Felix and is one of the core members in the Earth evacuation project. As the engineer and developer of the spacecraft, she has been used as a political weapon and has many enemies. In fact, she is just a naïve girl who desired the beauty of the outside world because she was locked inside the institution since she was born.

Elica (エリカ, Erika)
Voiced by: Yumiko Nakajima, Yuna Yamada (Plus+Mosaic)
She is also a Felix as well as Sion's older sister. She used to be a scientist doing research with Sion at the institution. Now she is Sion's personal doctor and maid. She also has a mysterious relationship with Ryō.

Naoto Inaba (稲葉 直人, Inaba Naoto)
Voiced by: Kōichi Tōchika, Chūjū Mibuno (Plus+Mosaic)
He is the leader of the facility guards. He seems like a slacker but is a really good soldier. He is the person who brought Ryō to the army and is like an older brother to Ryō.

Lavinia F. Asai (浅井･F･ラヴィニア, Asai F. Ravuinia)
Voiced by: Eriko Nakamura, Hitomi Tatano (Plus+Mosaic)
Lavinia is Ryō's friend who is also Sion's bodyguard. She is an expert of combat and always obeys her orders. She is also good at fighting with daggers.

=== Others ===
Natsume (ナツメ)
Voiced by: Junko Okada

Maya Tōno (塔野 真夜, Tōno Maya)
Voiced by: Mai Goto, Momo Harukawa (Plus+Mosaic)
Maya is a freelance news reporter that Ryō encounters a few months after escaping the research facility with Sion. She is really outgoing and does not stop at her pursuit of the truth. Upon encounter, Ryō is harsh and does not trust Maya, even though she is known by Sion herself.

== Related media ==
=== Manga ===
A manga adaptation, illustrated by Takeshi Moriki, was serialized between the August 2009 and March 2010 issues of Ichijinsha's Comic Rex manga magazine. One tankōbon volume was released on March 9, 2010.

=== Internet radio show ===
An Internet radio show produced by Onsen titled The End of Eden (終末のエデン, Shūmatsu no Eden) broadcast 30 episodes between July 3, 2009, and January 29, 2010. The show was hosted by Yumiko Nakajima and Kōichi Tōchika who play Erica and Naoto Inaba in the visual novel, respectively.

=== Music ===
The visual novel's opening theme is "Little Explorer" by Hitomi Harada. Tenmon and Eiichiro Yanagi produced the background music in the game.

=== Social game ===
A social game produced by CommSeed Corporation titled Eden* Campus Love Story (eden*学園恋物語, Eden* Gakuen Koimonogatari) was released on the Mobage browser game platform on March 11, 2011, and on the GREE browser game platform on November 29, 2011. At first, the player is designated as the vice-president of the students' union. The player can meet the characters of Eden* and impress them by communicating with them. The story of Eden* is present as a dream and connects both versions.
