= K. Juno =

Japanese rock singer and songwriter

K. Juno K.ジュノ
- Origin: Tokyo, Japan
- Genres: Rock; J-pop; jazz
- Occupations: Singer; lyricist; Singer-songwriter
- Instrument: Singing
- Label: Avace
- Website: www.surerock.net

K. Juno (Japanese: K.ジュノ) is a rock singer and songwriter from Japan. She is known for lyricist in Voices of a Distant Star.

== Filmography ==
Year	Film	Director	Language	Country	Notes	Ref
2002	Voices of a Distant Star	Makoto Shinkai	Japanese	Japan	lyrics to the theme song with TENMON	

== Music style ==
As a vocalist, Juno sings like a 1980s hard rock singer, while she writes rather 1970s rock flavored music. Juno also wrote the lyrics to the theme song for the Japanese CG animation Voices of a Distant Star by Makoto Shinkai, titled "Through the Years and Far Away (Hello, Little Star)".

== Discography ==
=== Solo albums ===
- Love Me (2000, mini album, 5 tracks)
- Juno Vol. 1 plus Fate (2005, 10 tracks)
- Amazing Grace (Out of the Holy Hands of Fate) (2007, CD-R, 4 tracks) (sung in Japanese)

=== Singer/songwriter albums ===
==== Wave (Morrigan) ====
- Feline Groove II (2003, 1 new / 16 tracks)
- Voyager (2004, 1 new / 1 remix / 10 tracks plus bonus)
- Mo Nakanaide (2004, 2 new / 9 tracks)
- Avalon (2004, 3 new / 16 tracks; album arranged for Fate/stay night)
- Caldes (2005, 3 new / 16 tracks)
- Aria (2006, 1 new / 14 tracks)
- White Avalon (2006, 4 new / 22 tracks)
- Yoru o Koete (2007, 1 new / 2 remix / 8 tracks)
- Archiv-East (2007, 1 remix / 38 tracks)
- Message (2007, 4 new/9 remix/13 tracks, all sung by K. Juno)

==== Cranky ====
- Rave-Slave (2003, 1 remix / 14 tracks)

==== PsG System Laboratory ====
- Artifact (2003, 3 new / 39 tracks; Tsukinosabaki & Typing Moon Online original soundtrack)
- Typing Moon (2003, online typing game)

==== Fusion Works ====
- Aura - 12 Pieces of Remedy (2006, 1 new / 12 tracks)

==== Kenichi Kitakata ====
- Believe (2007, CD-R, backup vocals)

=== As a lyricist ===
- Voices of a Distant Star soundtrack CD, DVD
