= She and Her Cat =

1999 Japanese OVA by Makoto Shinkai

- Cover art for She and Her Cat

彼女と彼女の猫 (Kanojo to Kanojo no Neko)
- Genre: Drama
- Original video animation
- Directed by: Makoto Shinkai
- Produced by: Makoto Shinkai
- Written by: Makoto Shinkai
- Music by: Tenmon
- Studio: CoMix Wave Films
- Licensed by: BI: Anime Limited; NA: GKIDS
- Released: 1999
- Runtime: 5 minutes
- Manga
- Written by: Tsubasa Yamaguchi
- Published by: Kodansha
- English publisher: NA: Vertical
- Imprint: Afternoon KC
- Magazine: Monthly Afternoon
- Original run: February 25, 2016 – May 25, 2016
- Volumes: 1
- Anime television series

She and Her Cat: Everything Flows
- Directed by: Kazuya Sakamoto
- Produced by: Tetsurō Satomi; Nariaki Miyata; Chiharu Ochiai; Terunari Yoshie
- Written by: Naruki Nagakawa
- Music by: To-Mas Soundsight Fluorescent Forest
- Studio: Liden Films Kyoto Studio
- Licensed by: Crunchyroll (streaming); NA: Discotek Media (home video)
- Original network: Tokyo MX
- Original run: March 4, 2016 – March 25, 2016
- Episodes: 4
- icon

She and Her Cat (Japanese: 彼女と彼女の猫, Hepburn: Kanojo to Kanojo no Neko), subtitled Their Standing Points, is a 1999 Japanese original video animation created and directed by Makoto Shinkai. His first own directed work, it is a five-minute story about the relationship between a male cat and his female owner told from the cat's perspective. Shinkai made the film to help a romantic interest overcome a difficult situation, and his time living in a small apartment defined the scenario. The team of four animators used Shinkai's hand-drawn illustrations and Adobe After Effects for 3D visual effects.

After completing the work, Shinkai himself distributed the film via CD-R and mail, selling 5,000 copies at anime conventions. The work was well received, winning the 2000 DoGA CG Animation Contest and attracting CoMix Wave Films' interest. The company re-released the film in CD-ROM format and hired Shinkai. In 2016, the story was adapted into an anime television series and a manga.

== Plot ==
One day, a young female office worker named Miyu, finds a white cat named Chobi and brings him back to her apartment. Over the course of a year's time, Chobi watches his new owner, remaining with her through the ups and downs of her life, including when she brings men home or drinks alcohol. The anime has a similar story but Miyu's cat is named Daru rather than Chobi.

== Production ==
She and Her Cat was written and directed by Makoto Shinkai. It is his first major animation work. He had the idea in 1997, but started it in 1998 while he was working as a graphic designer at Falcom, a video game company. Because he experimented with computer graphic animation during his work, he wanted to minimize complex procedures. So he opted to do a black-and-white film since a colored-one would use three times as much space in the computer and it would also make the process three times slower. He was working on a role-playing game, whose genre is known to have "very rich and detailed" surroundings, and this influenced the film's background details. He also took pictures of cityscapes and the streets, and used them as a basis for his hand-drawn animations. The composition of 3D scenes was done with Adobe After Effects and for other effects Shade, Illustrator and LightWave were used.

Shinkai described it as a "personal film" because it was made to encourage the girl he was in love with to go through some problems she had. The cat was the main character because he had cats since he was a child and adopted some stray cats in Tokyo. His own time living in a small apartment surrounded by electrical lines also inspired the main scenario. Although these are "ugly things", he "wanted to make it look detailed and beautiful to express that it was ok to live in such a situation". He aimed to transmit the feelings of "the vague loneliness of living", "slight pain" and "modest warmth", and as he thought it would be difficult to do it through words he did it through images and sound. Shinkai affirmed: "Without being too eager, I just let the animation speak for itself. I'm pleased with its simplicity."

Although most of the work had been done by Shinkai, who also provided the voice of the cat, he had three collaborators for the film: Mika Shinohara, who provided the voice for She and also did some illustrations; Tenmon, who composed the music; and "Rabsaris", who was credited for his "cooperation".

== Release and reception ==
After it was completed in 1999, Shinkai made his own copies of She and Her Cat on CD-R and sold around 5,000 copies at Comiket and by mail through his website. It received critical acclaim, and won the grand prize at the 2000 DoGA CG Animation Contest. Anime's authors Colin Odell and Michelle Le Blanc called it "simple, underplayed and just a little maudlin". Chris Beveridge of Mania.com watched the three versions and said "each looks gorgeous and the story for it is simply hauntingly beautiful". In a 2017 retrospective, Anne Lauenroth of Anime News Network ranked it Shinkai's ninth best work (out of 11), praising its use of lighting that gives "a modest beauty" to the scenery and its "carefully placed details" that transmits the wholeness of a world only partially presented.

She and Her Cat was the work that made Shinkai popular and it led him to work on the production company CoMix Wave Films, for which he produced his other films. At first he received "a very long e-mail" from the company in which there was a review telling why they appreciated the work and he was subsequently hired. The movie caught the attention of Mangazoo (who would become Comix Wave) and the company released the movie in a CD-ROM format. It contained its soundtrack and three different versions of the movie: the full five-minute version, a three-minute version, and a one-minute-and-half digest version. After it was out of print, it was also included in the DVD release of Voices of a Distant Star as an extra.

The only version to reach the United States is the subtitled version that comes with Voices of a Distant Star released by ADV Films in June 2003. The DVD includes the three different versions of the film. British company Anime Limited released the work as a special feature on their release of The Place Promised in Our Early Days/Voices of a Distant Star in 2016.

== Adaptations ==
=== Anime ===
An anime television adaptation, subtitled Everything Flows, was first announced in January 2016 through the February issue of Kadokawa Shoten's Newtype magazine. The anime was produced by Liden Films Kyoto Studio and directed by Kazuya Sakamoto. It aired between March 4 and 25, 2016 as part of Tokyo MX's Ultra Super Anime Time programming block. Crunchyroll made the anime available via stream worldwide except for Asia starting on March 4. In Japan, the anime was released in Blu-ray and DVD on May 18, 2016, and it included a "complete edition" with additional footage, including a 90-second opening sequence. This edition received a theatrical release from May 21 to 27, at the Tollywood theater in Shimokitazawa, Tokyo. The DVD and the Blu-Ray release sold 230 and 1,521 copies respectively, appearing at 18th and 6th place on Oricon's best-selling list on their respective categories. On May 26, 2020, the anime was released in Blu-ray in the United States by Discotek Media with English subtitles and a new dub.

==== Episodes ====
No.	Title	Original release date
1	"She and Her Apartment"; Transliteration: "Kanojo to Kanojo no Heya" (Japanese: 彼女と彼女の部屋)	March 4, 2016
2	"She and Her Sky"; Transliteration: "Kanojo to Kanojo no Sora" (Japanese: 彼女と彼女の空)	March 11, 2016
3	"She and the Look in Her Eyes"; Transliteration: "Kanojo to Kanojo no Manazashi" (Japanese: 彼女と彼女のまなざし)	March 18, 2016
4	"She and Her Story"; Transliteration: "Kanojo to Kanojo no Monogatari" (Japanese: 彼女と彼女の物語)	March 25, 2016

=== Manga ===
A manga adaptation of the anime series illustrated by Tsubasa Yamaguchi was announced in the March 2016 issue of Kodansha's seinen manga magazine Monthly Afternoon. It began serialization in the magazine's April 2016 issue, released on February 25, and ended in the magazine's July 2016 issue on May 25. Its chapters were collected in a single tankōbon volume, released by Kodansha on August 23, 2016. In January 2017, Vertical licensed the series, releasing one volume in the North American market on August 1.

==== Chapters ====
No.	Original release date	Original ISBN	English release date	English ISBN
1	August 23, 2016	978-4-06-388172-1	August 1, 2017	978-1-68233-786-8 (digital); 978-1-94505-440-2 (print)
1. "Spring Rain" (春の雨, Haru no Ame); 2. "First Summer" (初めての夏, Hajimete no Natsu); 3. "Cool Wind" (涼しい風, Suzushii Kaze); 4. "Winter Landscape" (冬景色, Fuyugeshiki)

=== Novel ===
In 2022, the story was adapted into a novel by Shinkai together with Naruki Nagakawa, with the English release translated by Ginny Tapley Takemori and published by Doubleday.
