= The Place Promised in Our Early Days =

2004 Japanese film by Makoto Shinkai

- © Makoto Shinkai / CoMix Wave

雲のむこう、約束の場所 (Kumo no Mukō, Yakusoku no Basho)
- Anime film
- Directed by: Makoto Shinkai
- Produced by: Makoto Shinkai
- Written by: Makoto Shinkai
- Music by: Tenmon
- Studio: CoMix Wave Inc.
- Licensed by: AUS: Madman Entertainment; NA: GKIDS; UK: Anime Limited
- Released: November 20, 2004
- Runtime: 90 minutes
- Manga
- Written by: Makoto Shinkai
- Illustrated by: Sumomo Yumeka
- Published by: Kodansha
- Magazine: Monthly Afternoon
- Original run: December 24, 2005 – August 25, 2006
- Novel
- Written by: Arata Kanoh
- Published by: Enterbrain
- English publisher: NA: Yen Press
- Published: December 26, 2005
- icon

The Place Promised in Our Early Days (Japanese: 雲のむこう、約束の場所, Hepburn: Kumo no Mukō, Yakusoku no Basho; lit. 'Beyond the Clouds, the Promised Place') is a 2004 Japanese animated dystopian drama film written, produced, cinematographed, directed and edited by Makoto Shinkai in his feature film debut. Set over several years in an alternate history where Japan was divided after the Soviet Union occupied the island of Hokkaido, the film follows two childhood friends who grow apart after one of their friends disappears. As international tensions rise and a mysterious tower built by the Union starts replacing matter around it with matter from other universes, they cross paths once again and realize their missing friend might be the key to saving the world.

Unlike his short film Voices of a Distant Star, which was largely made by Shinkai on his own, The Place Promised in Our Early Days is a full-scale production, as reflected by its better animation quality and longer running time. It has been broadcast across Japan by the anime satellite television network Animax. It was licensed for North American release by ADV Films and is now licensed by GKIDS.

It was one of Makoto Shinkai's films to be selected to be screened at the Japanese film festival in India as part of celebrations of 70th anniversary of establishment of India-Japan diplomatic relations.

== Plot ==
In an alternate reality where World War II had ended with the Separation of Japan, the northern island of Hokkaidō (or Ezo, as it is called in the film) is occupied by the "Union" (referring to the Soviet Union) while the rest of the country is occupied by the United States. In 1974, the Union begins the construction of a strange tower on Hokkaido designed by a scientist named Ekusun Tsukinoe. The anime follows the story of three friends living in Aomori, in northern Japan: two boys, Hiroki Fujisawa and Takuya Shirakawa, both child prodigies; and one girl, Sayuri Sawatari. In 1996, the three are in ninth grade, their last year of middle school, and they are fascinated by the Hokkaido Tower visible across the Tsugaru Strait to the north. Sayuri becomes close friends with the two boys. By 1999, the Cold War is still ongoing with Japan and Hokkaido separated.

The boys find a crashed Maritime Self-Defense Force drone aircraft and work on rebuilding the plane with the support of Mr. Okabe, their boss at a military plant. The three teenagers promise to one day fly to Hokkaido to visit the Tower. However, before they can do this, Sayuri mysteriously disappears during the summer.

Three years later, Takuya and Hiroki have stopped working on the plane, having taken different paths after the grief they suffered at Sayuri's disappearance. Takuya is working as a physicist at an Alliance scientific facility sponsored by the U.S. National Security Agency, researching parallel universes alongside Ms. Maki Kasahara under the supervision of Professor Tomizawa. They know that the Hokkaido Tower, which began operating in 1996, replaces matter around it with matter from other universes, but they do not yet know why it does this for only a 2-km radius. Takuya becomes involved with the Uilta Liberation Front after he learns that Mr. Okabe is its leader; his factory workers are the other agents of the organization. Okabe signs Takuya on for an excursion to Ezo with Uilta.

Sayuri is revealed to have been hospitalized over the past three years, having developed an extreme form of narcolepsy; she has been sleeping continuously for most of the three years. Her mind is trapped in an unpopulated parallel universe, where she is all alone. Tomizawa has discovered that she is somehow connected to the Union's research into parallel universes and the Hokkaido Tower's ability to change the surrounding land into alternate possibilities, but Tomizawa keeps this information, as well as her whereabouts, secret from Takuya initially. Tomizawa is secretly working with the Uilta Liberation Front and lets Mr. Okabe know about Sayuri, while Mr. Okabe reveals that the Uilta Liberation Front plans to bomb the Hokkaido Tower to incite war against the Union, hoping that this will lead to the reunification of Japan.

Takuya finally learns of the most likely scenario through his coworker – that Sayuri was used by her grandfather, a Union physicist, to channel all of the Tower's unstable dimension-creating energy somewhere other than Earth, the implication of him not having done so likely having resulted in the dimension creating chain reactions around the tower to continue growing in area until it enveloped the whole world. Saddened, he goes back to the old warehouse where he and Hiroki were working on the plane, only to find Hiroki, who wants Takuya to help him complete the plane to save Sayuri. He coldly points a gun at Hiroki and has him choose between Sayuri and the World without waiting for an answer – walking away in pain.

With Okabe's guidance, Takuya locks up his coworker and takes Sayuri away from the NSA compound – Takuya and Hiroki finally come back together to work on the plane. Takuya helps to finish the final programming of the plane, as they plan, using the cover of the soon coming declaration of war against Ezo, to fly to the tower and destroy it before its rays affect everything on Earth, which in turn will save Sayuri.

The plane only seats two, so Takuya allows Hiroki to pilot the plane and fulfill their childhood promise. Hiroki manages to fly the plane across the strait to the Tower carrying Sayuri and a missile provided by the Uilta Liberation Front. When Sayuri finally awakens while the plane circles the Tower, the Tower activates and immediately begins to transform the surrounding area; the area under transformation grows to encompass much of Hokkaido. In the last few minutes of her coma, Sayuri realizes that when she awakes she will lose all her memories of her dreams of the past three years, and thus upon waking she weeps because, unknowingly, she lost the memory of her love for Hiroki. Flying back, Hiroki fires the missile, destroying the Tower and stopping the matter transformation. The film ends with Hiroki vowing to Sayuri that they will start their relationship anew.

== Cast ==
Character	Japanese voice actor	English voice actor
Hiroki Fujisawa (藤沢 浩紀, Fujisawa Hiroki)	Hidetaka Yoshioka	Chris Patton
Takuya Shirakawa (白川 拓也, Shirakawa Takuya)	Masato Hagiwara	Kalob Martinez
Sayuri Sawatari (沢渡 佐由理, Sawatari Sayuri)	Yūka Nanri	Jessica Boone
Professor Tsuneo Tomizawa (富澤 常夫, Tomizawa Tsuneo)	Kazuhiko Inoue	Andy McAvin
Maki Kasahara (笠原 真希, Kasahara Maki)	Risa Mizuno	Kira Vincent-Davis
Okabe (岡部)	Unshō Ishizuka	John Swasey
Arisaka (有坂)	Hidenobu Kiuchi	Illich Guardiola
Emishi Manufacturing employee	Eiji Takemoto	Adam Jones
Emishi Manufacturing employee, Hospital Director, Train Announcer	Masami Iwasaki	Andrew Love
Emishi Manufacturing employee, Graduate Student	Takahiro Hirano	Jacob A. Gragard
Female student, Nurse, TV Announcer	Maki Saitou	Hilary Haag
Female student	Yuki Nakao	Mariela Ortiz
Male student	Kōsuke Kujirai	Matthew Crawford
Female student, Nurse, Hiroki's girlfriend	Rie Nakagawa	Lesley Tesh
Patrol Boat Warnings	Hirochika Kamize	—N/a
US Military Officer	Brett Coleman	—N/a
NSA	Ian O'Neal	Ian O'Neal
Additional voices	—N/a	Carl Ruthers; Chris Nelson; Jacob Jones; John Gremillion; Rob Mungle

== Allusions ==
The film includes several references to other literary works and themes, such as separation and dreams. The poem read by Sayuri in class is Eiketsu no Asa (永訣の朝, Morning of the Last Farewell) from the poem collection Haru to Shura (春と修羅, Spring and Asura) by well-known Japanese writer Kenji Miyazawa (1896–1933). It was written on the occasion of the premature death of his sister, Toshi Miyazawa (1898–1922). Furthermore, during the summer sequence in the film, Sayuri is seen reading a novel titled The Net Involved in a Dream (夢網; lit. 'Dream Net') by Morishita Sakae. Although the author is fictional, a book of the same name exists by a similarly named poet, Hoshio Sakae.

A reference to the director's previous work is made when Takuya and Hiroki meet at the station. They see a cat which Takuya calls Chobi, the name of the cat from She and Her Cat.

== Media ==
=== Music ===
==== Theme song ====
Your voice (きみのこえ, Kimi no koe)

- Performed by Ai Kawashima
- Lyrics by Makoto Shinkai
- Music by Tenmon
- Arranged by Tenmon

==== Original soundtrack ====
Beyond the Clouds, the Promised Place
No.	Title	Length
1.	"Main Theme" (メインテーマ)	01:28
2.	"Daily Life" (日常 / Nichijou)	02:23
3.	"Station" (駅 / Eki)	01:33
4.	"Sayuri" (サユリ)	00:46
5.	"Their Plan" (二人の計画 / Futari no Keikaku)	01:44
6.	"Another Dream" (もう一つの夢 / Mou Hitotsu no Yume)	01:07
7.	"Hope and Longing" (希望と憧れ / Kibou to Akogare)	02:01
8.	"A Distant Promise" (遠い約束 / Tooi Yakusoku)	01:29
9.	"Sayuri's Melody" (サユリの旋律 / Sayuri no Senritsu)	01:54
10.	"Sign" (兆候 / Choukou)	01:22
11.	"Innocence" (無垢 / Muku)	01:07
12.	"Summer's End" (夏の終わり / Natsu no Owari)	01:08
13.	"The Quest" (探求 / Tankyuu)	01:49
14.	"The World's Dream" (世界の見る夢 / Sekai no Miru Yume)	00:34
15.	"A Deserted Place" (誰もいない場所 / Dare mo Inai Basho)	00:56
16.	"Loneliness" (孤独 / Kodoku)	03:56
17.	"The Raid – Sleeping Beauty" (襲撃〜眠り姫 / Shuugeki ~ Nemuri Hime)	01:51
18.	"A Brief Reunion" (ひとときの再会 / Hitotoki no Saikai)	05:04
19.	"Eternal Summer" (永遠の夏 / Eien no Natsu)	01:44
20.	"Their Conflict" (二人の葛藤 / Futari no Kattou)	01:47
21.	"Sayuri's World" (サユリの世界 / Sayuri no Sekai)	00:59
22.	"Takuya's Resolution" (タクヤの決意 / Takuya no Ketsui)	02:17
23.	"Hiroki's Melody" (ヒロキの旋律 / Hiroki no Senritsu)	01:13
24.	"The Battle Begins – Velaciela" (開戦〜ヴェラシーラ / Kaisen ~ Velaciela)	01:34
25.	"The Place Promised in Our Early Days" (雲のむこう、約束の場所 / Kumo no Mukou, Yakusoku no Basho)	03:58
26.	"Your Voice" (きみのこえ / Kimi no Koe)	05:26
27.	"The Place Promised in Our Early Days (Pilot Version)" (パイロット版「雲のむこう、約束の場所」 / Pilot-ban 'Kumo no Mukou, Yakusoku no Basho')	02:47

=== DVD ===
==== Regular release ====
- The Place Promised in Our Early Days (90 Minutes)
- 3 Video Interviews with Japanese Cast
- Original Japanese Trailer Collection

==== Collector's edition ====
===== Disc 1 (DVD) =====
- The Place Promised in Our Early Days (90 Minutes)
- 3 Video Interviews with Japanese Cast
- Original Japanese Trailer Collection

===== Disc 2 (DVD) =====
- The Place Promised in Our Early Days (Animated Storyboards, 90 Minutes)
- Interview with Makoto Shinkai
- Animated Gallery 2002 – 2004

===== Disc 3 (CDROM) =====
- 35 Still Images
- Sheet Music

===== DVD Book =====
- The Place Promised in Our Early Days (Storyboards, 360 pages)

=== Manga ===
A manga adaptation, written by Makoto Shinkai and illustrated by Mizu Sahara, was serialized in Kodansha's seinen manga magazine Monthly Afternoon. It began serialization on December 24, 2005, and ended on August 25, 2006, with eight chapters in total.

=== Novelization ===
A novelization written by Arata Kanoh was published by Kadokawa on December 26, 2005. It was licensed for English publication by Yen Press in 2020.

=== Stage adaptation ===
The film was adapted into a stage play directed by Yuko Naito, with a script by Shigeki Motoiki and music by Masato Komata. It had seven performances from April 20–24, 2018 at Tokyo International Forum Hall C in Tokyo, and two performances on May 2, 2018, at NHK Osaka Hall in Osaka.

The cast included Yudai Tatsumi, Shô Takada, Momoka Ito, Kazuyuki Matsuzawa, Wataru Kozuki, Atsuko Asano.

== Awards ==
- Special Distinction (Feature Film category) – Seoul Comics and Animation Festival 2005
- Jury Selection in the 9th Japan Media Arts Festival
- Silver Prize on Best Animated Film Section (by audience choice) of Public Prize – Canada Fantasia Film Festival 2005
- Award for Art in Seiun Award – 44th Japanese SF Convention
- Best Animation Film – Mainichi Film Awards 2004
- Award for Expression Technique (for Trailer #1) – Tokyo International Anime Fair 2003
