= Children Who Chase Lost Voices =

2011 Japanese film by Makoto Shinkai

- Theatrical release poster
- Directed by: Makoto Shinkai
- Written by: Makoto Shinkai
- Produced by: Toshiaki Dōshita; Kōichirō Itō; Atsushi Iwasaki; Tomohiro Ogawa
- Starring: Hisako Kanemoto; Kazuhiko Inoue; Miyu Irino
- Cinematography: Makoto Shinkai
- Edited by: Aya Hida; Makoto Shinkai
- Music by: Tenmon
- Production company: CoMix Wave Films
- Distributed by: Media Factory
- Release date: May 7, 2011
- Running time: 116 minutes
- Country: Japan
- Language: Japanese

Children Who Chase Lost Voices (Japanese: 星を追う子ども, Hepburn: Hoshi o Ou Kodomo; lit. 'Children Who Chase Stars'), also known as Journey to Agartha, is a 2011 Japanese anime fantasy film written and directed by Makoto Shinkai, and produced by CoMix Wave Films. It follows an elementary school girl and her substitute teacher travelling to the depths of the world. The film was released in Japan on May 7, 2011. It was released on DVD and Blu-ray in Japan on November 25, 2011. The film was previously licensed by Sentai Filmworks in North America and released on DVD and Blu-ray in November 2012. On May 9, 2019, it was announced that Sentai had lost the North American license, causing the releases to go out of print. On March 10, 2022, GKIDS announced that they have licensed Children Who Chase Lost Voices, along with three other works by Shinkai, and the film was re-released on home video in 2023.

== Plot ==
Asuna Watase has been forced to grow up following the death of her father. Her mother is a nurse who works long shifts at the local hospital, leaving Asuna to fend for herself much of the time. Asuna has difficulty relating to those her own age, and spends her days alone. She spends much of her time listening to the mysterious music emanating from the cat's-whisker receiver her father gave to her as a memento, accompanied by her pet cat Mimi, who bears strange red markings on her fur.

One day, while crossing a bridge en route to her clubhouse, she is ambushed by a fearsome creature and saved by a mysterious teenage boy named Shun. Asuna treats his injuries following the fight, and later, the two listen to the radio together. Shun tells Asuna that he is from a country named Agartha, and that he traveled to this place in search of something. He gives Asuna a blessing in the form of a kiss on her forehead, and tells her that she's like him, a wanderer, called to distant places. Asuna leaves, but tells Shun she will return the following day. However, Shun succumbs to his injuries and dies after Asuna's departure, while looking at the sky.

The next day, Asuna hears from her mother about a boy in the river, but she refuses to believe the boy is Shun. Asuna's substitute teacher, Mr. Morisaki, gives the class a lecture on a book about Agartha, the land of the dead. When Asuna visits Morisaki after class, he explains to her that long ago, humans needed the guidance of Quetzalcoatls, keepers of the dead, until they matured and no longer needed them. The psychopomps then went underground, along with the few who joined them.

Afterwards, Asuna goes to the hideout to find another mysterious boy resembling Shun standing on the ledge. Soon, a group of armed men, called the Arch Angels, appear and ambush them. The mysterious boy hides in the underground entrance with Asuna, and the two proceed further into the cave when the cave's entrance is bombed. The two meet a Quetzalcoatl who has apparently lost its physical senses and attacks the boy. The boy refuses to kill the gatekeeper, but gives Asuna his clavis, a crystal, and defends himself. The Arch Angels interfere, killing the gatekeeper. The Arch Angel commander captures Asuna and uses the clavis to open a gateway to Agartha. The commander and Asuna enter the gateway followed by the boy. Once inside, the commander reveals himself to be Morisaki and the boy also reveals himself to be Shin, Shun's younger brother. Morisaki tells Shin that all he wants is to resurrect his wife, Lisa. Shin leaves Asuna and Morisaki.

Morisaki tells Asuna that she must return home, but she decides to accompany him. They both go into the realm via an underwater entrance. Once inside, they journey to the Gate of Life and Death, which can resurrect people from the dead, along with Mimi (who had sneaked in inside Asuna's backpack).

Upon arriving in his village, Shin is told he failed his mission to retrieve the clavis, because Asuna has unknowingly returned with a fragment of one. Shin plans to stop Asuna and Morisaki from wreaking havoc in Agartha. Along the way, Asuna is kidnapped by a race of monsters called the Izoku. She awakens in a closed area and meets a young girl named Manna. They are unable to escape. The day begins to darken and the Izoku begin to appear, but they can only move in the shadows. In their escape attempt they encounter Shin, who helps them but is wounded by an Izoku during the escape. Morisaki finds Asuna and Manna down the river, as well as Shin and Mimi. Shin tries to retrieve the clavis crystal fragment that Asuna had. However, he is too weak to put up a fight and Morisaki easily defeats him. Asuna convinces Morisaki to take him with them while Manna leads them to her village.

Once there, the villagers are at first reluctant to help the "top-dwellers", but the village elder convinces the guards to let them in. The elder allows them to stay one night at the village because they have brought Manna back, but they cannot stay more than that due to past history in that top-dwellers always bring bad luck to Agartha. Meanwhile, Asuna checks up on Shin, but he tells her to leave the village.

The next day, Asuna and Morisaki leave Amaurot by boat, but Mimi stays with the villagers. Shin wakes up and finds that Mimi has died. Shin, Manna, and the elder proceed to offer Mimi's corpse to the Quetzalcoatl. When Shin sees the villagers riding away to kill them, he decides to follow, in order to protect Asuna. Morisaki and Asuna walk towards a steep cliff, when they are ambushed by the villagers but they are saved by Shin. Morisaki trades the gun for the clavis shard with Asuna, when she refuses to climb down the ledge. Meanwhile, Shin is fighting the villagers and is about to be killed when they sense that the clavis crystal has reached the Gate of Life and Death. They leave Shin to wander aimlessly, having betrayed his country.

Asuna stays in the river on the night, before accepting the truth that she came to Agartha, and that she was lonely. When the water dries up, she is ambushed and attacked by the Izoku, but is saved by Shin. The two return to the cliff after seeing the Ark of Life descending. They encounter a Quetzalcoatl. Before dying, he sings a song to send all of the memories into the world. Asuna realizes that the last song she heard in her world was Shun's. The Quetzalcoatl offers to take them to the bottom of the cliff.

They both find the Gate of Life and Death and enter it. Morisaki has already made a wish for Lisa to return. However, her soul requires a vessel. Asuna and Shin find Morisaki, who tells Asuna she should not have come. She is soon possessed by the soul of Lisa, but the price becomes insufficient. Morisaki loses his eye. To undo Asuna's possession, Shin destroys the clavis crystal, despite Morisaki's warning. Breaking the crystal brings Asuna's soul back to her body, when she had an illusion. Before Lisa leaves Asuna's body, she tells Morisaki to find happiness without her. Asuna gets reverted to her normal self, but Morisaki is devastated and asks Shin to kill him. However, he tells him that carrying the burden of a deceased person can bring a curse, telling Morisaki to live on. Asuna says farewell to Shin and Morisaki, and heads back to the surface. A year later, an older Asuna looks out her window at the cliff side where she had met Shun and Shin. She returns to school for a graduation ceremony.

== Characters ==
Asuna Watase (渡瀬 明日菜 (あすな), Watase Asuna)
Voiced by: Hisako Kanemoto (Japanese); Hilary Haag (English)
A sixth grade student who was forced to grow up quickly after her father died. She spends her free time alone at the hideout on the cliffside. There, she listens to music from a radio using a strange crystal as a diode that was given to her by her late father.
Shin Canaan Preases (しん)
Voiced by: Miyu Irino (Japanese); Leraldo Anzaldua (English)
A mysterious boy about 2 years older than Asuna. He is sent by his village to the surface to retrieve the clavis from Asuna and Mr. Morisaki.
Ryūji Morisaki (森崎 竜司 (りゅうじ), Morisaki Ryūji)
Voiced by: Kazuhiko Inoue (Japanese); David Matranga (English)
Asuna's substitute teacher who is very knowledgeable about Agartha. His desire is to revive his wife, Lisa (リサ, Risa), from the dead with the power of the Gate of Life and Death.
Shun Canaan Preases (しゅん)
Voiced by: Miyu Irino (Japanese); Corey Hartzog (English)
Shin's older twin brother from the land of Agartha. His dream is to see the surface.
Yuu Yazaki (矢崎 ユウ, Yazaki Yuu)
Voiced by: Yūna Inamura (Japanese); Brittney Karbowski (English)
Asuna's classmate.

Other voice actors include Fumiko Orikasa as Asuna's mother, voiced by Shelley Calene-Black in the English dub, Junko Takeuchi as Asuna's pet cat Mimi (みみ), voiced by Emily Neves in the English dub, Tamio Ōki as the Amaurot village elder, voiced by Sam Roman in the English dub, and Sumi Shimamoto as Lisa (リサ), voiced by Shannon Emerick in the English dub.

== Development ==
Shinkai visited London after working on 5 Centimeters per Second in 2008. He returned to Japan in 2009 to start working on the film. He released two concept drawings for the film in December 2009 and noted that most of his works in the past decade were stories about characters who have to part ways with those they hold dear, but he wanted to take the theme further and wanted to deal more specifically on how to overcome the loss.

In November 2010, he revealed critical information about Children Who Chase Lost Voices from Deep Below such as the title, plot summary, release date, and a teaser trailer. As with his previous films, Shinkai served as the director and screenwriter, Takayo Nishimura served as a character designer, Takumi Tanji served as an art director, and music composer Tenmon collaborated with Shinkai again.

Before the film was released in May 2011, manga adaptations were set to begin serialization in April 2011 in the first issue of the new magazine Monthly Comic Gene and in Monthly Comic Flapper, both by Media Factory.

== Broadcast ==
The film's English adaptation was broadcast on Adult Swim's Toonami programming block in the United States on November 5, 2016.

== Reception ==
Luke Halliday from Capsule Computers gave the film a perfect score, heralding the film as Shinkai's finest: "Children Who Chase Lost Voices is an astonishing film that truly feels like the culmination of Shinkai's entire career up until this point. It is his most ambitious work to date and quite simply his crowning achievement in the art form." He continued on to highlight the film's significance to anime as an artform: "This is perhaps the most important anime film of the new millennium, because it marks an important changing of tides. It is films like Children Who Chase Lost Voices that remind us of how magical anime can truly be."

The Encyclopedia of Science Fiction praised Children Who Chase Lost Voices as visually beautiful and considered its plot reasonable, while finding that its worldbuilding did not entirely cohere. It criticized the film's shifting narrative focus, noting that although Asuna is the viewpoint character, she remains largely passive, while Ryūji drives the plot and undergoes the more substantial development through his struggle with grief. The encyclopedia also found Asuna's stated motivation of loneliness insufficiently developed. It compared the film with the work of Hayao Miyazaki, particularly Castle in the Sky, interpreting the similarities as a possible tribute that succeeds more strongly in its visuals than in its characterization.
