= Minori (company) =

Japanese visual novel company

Minori (みのり; stylised minori) was a Japanese visual novel company (previously the software division of CoMixWave until April 2007). Their most successful game is Ef: A Fairy Tale of the Two., which has had a manga and two anime television series based on it, and was ported to the PlayStation 2 in April 2010. They use Musica as their main engine. A few of their earlier games' opening movies were animated by Makoto Shinkai. Minori is known for its stance against fan-translations and piracy and has garnered some infamy for its actions against fan translation group No Name Losers and TLWiki, due to the controversy regarding the video game Rapelay by Illusion Soft. As a result, its main webpage is blocked for people outside Japan. In 2010, Minori, MangaGamer, and No Name Losers announced a partnership to make commercial English versions of Minori's visual novels available. On February 28, 2019, Minori announced the cessation of operations.

== Published games ==
- August 31, 2001: Bittersweet Fools
- April 19, 2002: Wind: A Breath of Heart
  - December 27, 2002: Soyokaze no Okurimono: Wind Pleasurable Box (fan disc)
- July 23, 2004: Haru no Ashioto
  - March 31, 2006: Sakura no Sakukoro: Haru no Ashioto Pleasurable Box (fan disc)
- March 25, 2005: Angel Type
- Ef: A Fairy Tale of the Two
  - August 25, 2006: Ef: First Fan Disc
  - December 22, 2006: Ef: The First Tale.
  - May 30, 2008: Ef: The Latter Tale.
  - September 17, 2010: Tenshi no Nichiyōbi (fan disc)
- September 18, 2009: Eden*
- December 29, 2011: Supipara Nice to Meet You!
- December 21, 2012: Natsuzora no Perseus
- January 31, 2014: 12 no Tsuki no Eve
- February 27, 2015: Soreyori no Prologue
- February 26, 2016: Tsumi no Hikari Rendezvous
- March 31, 2017: Trinoline
  - January 26, 2018: Trinoline: Genesis
- 2018: Sono Hi no Kemono ni wa,

== Core staff ==
- Nobukazu Sakai, aka nbkz (Producer, Director, Song Lyricist, Concept Planner)
- Makoto Shinkai (Animation Movie Director, not attached to the company)
- Mikage (Director, Planner, and Scenario Writer)
- Yū Kagami (Scenario Writer)
- Tenmon (Music Composer)
- Tatsuya Yūki (Character Designer, Line Producer)
- Mitsuishi Shōna (Character Designer)
- Kimchee (Character Designer/core member of Haru no Ashioto, not attached to the company)
- 2C Galore (Character Designer/core member of Ef, not attached to the company)
- Naru Nanao (Character Designer/core member of Ef, not attached to the company)
