= Wind: A Breath of Heart =

Japanese visual novel and anime series

- Wind -A Breath of Heart- logo
- Genre: Drama, romance
- Video game
- Developer: Minori (Windows); HuneX (DC, PS2)
- Publisher: Alchemist
- Genre: Visual novel
- Platform: Windows; Dreamcast; PlayStation 2
- Released: April 19, 2002 (Windows); January 30, 2003 (DC); December 18, 2003 (PS2); December 14, 2006 (PS2 re-release)
- Original video animation
- Directed by: Sata
- Written by: Takumi Kusube
- Music by: Tenmon; TwoFive; Ari
- Studio: Ajia-do
- Released: December 27, 2002
- Original video animation
- Directed by: Tsuneo Tominaga
- Written by: Mami Watanabe
- Music by: Minami Nozaki
- Studio: Venet
- Released: May 28, 2004
- Episodes: 3
- Anime television series
- Directed by: Mitsuhiro Tougou
- Studio: Radix Ace Entertainment
- Original network: AT-X
- Original run: June 30, 2004 – September 22, 2004
- Episodes: 13

Wind: A Breath of Heart is a visual novel by Japanese game studio Minori. It was first released for Windows on April 19, 2002 with adult content. It was later ported to the Dreamcast and PlayStation 2 by Alchemist in 2003 with the adult content removed. It features voiced dialog for all characters except for the protagonist. It has been adapted into an anime series with thirteen episodes and four special ones (9.5, 10.4, 10.8 and 12.5), four OVAs, and a manga. An English-language fan translation of the visual novel exists.

== History ==
The Windows version of the game went on sale on April 19, 2002. It was followed by the Soyokaze no Okurimono -Wind Pleasurable Box- on December 27, 2002 which featured a 16-minute OVA Christmas Special along with the game. In 2003, the game was released in two different versions with the Dreamcast version going on sale on January 30 and the PlayStation 2 version on December 18. June 2004 saw the first of 3 KSS OVA's go on sale on the 25th and on the 30th, the anime television series officially started to air. On November 5 of the same year, Wind - a breath of heart - Re:gratitude went on sale.

== Plot ==
Makoto was born in Kazune city where he and his sister, Hinata, played with Minamo. After his father's death he and his sister as well as Minamo's family move away. When his family moves for the second time, he gives Minamo a harmonica and the two of them pinky-swear to meet again some day and marry.

The game begins ten years later. Makoto and Hinata return to Kazune and enroll at the High School where Makoto is reunited with Minamo. He learns that many people from the city have unique special powers. Hinata, for example, can jump higher than most 2-story buildings. Minamo can control the wind, Nozomi can create shockwaves with edged weapons, and Wakaba can cure wounds and slow diseases. The town is also home to a long series of murders and mysterious disappearances.

Professor Akihito, Minamo's father, research into the city's mysteries in an attempt to understand what caused these powers to develop, begins a chain of events and it is the player's goal to help Makoto uncover these mysteries while forging bonds with one of the five girls.

== Characters ==
Makoto Okano (丘野真)

As the main protagonist, Makoto is impulsive but also compassionate towards the pain of others. He often acts without consideration for the consequences, which garners respect and bewilderment from the methodological Hikari.

- Voiced by: Hisayoshi Suganuma (anime only)

Minamo Narukaze (鳴風みなも)

She has practiced playing her harmonica for four years hoping for Makoto to return and keep his promise. Unlike Makoto, she takes their childhood promise seriously and wants to marry now that they are older. Throughout the game she is straightforward and assertive about her love for Makoto. Is the real sister of Hinata and Wakaba.

- Voiced by: Hiyori Haruno (game), Miwa Kouzuki (anime)

Hinata Okano (丘野ひなた)

Makoto's athletic younger sister. Being very active, she commonly follows her brother around or pulls pranks on him. She carries a pair of binoculars which she uses to spy on things, and is fascinated with the blimp that flies over the city each day. She is hyper, and when she gets hurt, angry or confused, her favorite catchphrase is "Unyah~!" She is the real sister of Minamo and Wakaba.

- Voiced by: Honoka Atami (game), Ritsuko Kasai (anime)

Nozomi Fujimiya (藤宮望)

Nozomi Fujimiya serves tables with her sister Wakaba. She is skilled at Kendo, although she has a weak heart and often needs Wakaba to heal her when she collapses. She loves her sister, but feels guilty that her poor health is a burden. She and Wakaba are adopted siblings.

- Voiced by: Misuzu Sakurai (game), Junko Okada (anime)

Wakaba Fujimiya (藤宮わかば)

Gifted with the ability to prophesize the future, she can also heal. Her ardent desire is to improve her abilities so that she can heal her sister's heart condition. She has a shy and compassionate personality. She is the real sister of Minamo and Hinata. She has weak clairvoyance ability.

- Voiced by: Sayaka Aoki (anime)

Hikari Tsukishiro (月代彩)

Hikari is the most knowledgeable person about all of the cities mysteries. In the game her route only opens after the four other girls' routes have been cleared. She first forms a relationship with Makoto when he rescues a cat from a tree; although Hikari is content to observe the world from a distance, Makoto's hands-on approach intrigues her.

Hikari is skilled with a katana, a good cook, and she enjoys painting the open sky. She tends to distances herself from other people because of a myriad of lies and given reasons; such as that she doesn't want others to get hurt, or that strong people don't need to rely on others. Yet in reality she longs for human interaction, but fears being rejected.

- Voiced by: Rita (game), Riko Hirai (anime)

Akihito Narukaze (鳴風秋人)

A friendly history professor. He is Minamo's father and was a close friend to Makoto's parents before they died. He is determined to research the city and apply his knowledge to stop the line of murders and save the city. He is also the true father of Hinata and Wakaba.

- Voiced by: Jin Horikawa

Kasumi Shikouin (紫光院霞)

A schoolgirl often seen together with Tsutomu. She wears eyeglasses to negate her ability to see one's true feelings, and she is fond of purchasing tea leaves from Hikari's shop.

- Voiced by: Satomi Kodama

Tsutomu Tachibana (橘勤)

Makoto's male friend. He is clumsy and will flirt with any woman.

- Voiced by: Akio Suyama

== Staff ==
- Scenario: Masaya Mukai, Nozomu Koga
- Music: TWO-FIVE
  - Opening:Wind
    Lyrics:Don Mccow
    Music:Tanimoto Maki
    Vocal:Hasegawa Megumi
  - Ending:Tsu-ba-sa
    Lyrics:Don Mccow
    Music:Tanimoto Maki
    Vocal:Watanabe Eimi
  - Insert:Dream
    Lyrics:Don Mccow
    Music:Tanimoto Maki
    Vocal:Hasegawa Megumi
  - Additional song on consumer version (Opening, Kasumi Ending):Flow
    Lyrics:Hiroki
    Music:Hiroki
    Vocal:Koduki Miwa
- Movie: Makoto Shinkai

== Anime ==
=== TV series ===
No.	Title	Original release date
1	"Melody of Reunion"	June 30, 2004
2	"Memorable Promise"	July 7, 2004
3	"A Girl Named Hikari"	July 14, 2004
4	"Children Without Parents"	July 21, 2004
5	"Light and Shadow"	July 28, 2004
6	"Courage to Take the Step"	August 4, 2004
7	"The Kindness of the Blue Sky"	August 11, 2004
8	"Wind and Night Sky"	August 18, 2004
9	"Roar of Kazune"	August 25, 2004
9.5	"The Sorrow of the Wind"	December 10, 2004
10	"The Assimilating Body"	September 1, 2004
10.4	"Tell Me Your Feelings..."	December 10, 2004
10.8	"Uncertain Feelings"	December 10, 2004
11	"Destiny from Ancient Times"	September 8, 2004
Makoto finds Hikari at the temple and she decides to tell him everything when he says he wants to find a way for everyone to be happy. Apparently, in ancient times Hikari was just a normal priestess. When she saw the ritual sacrifice being done she could not handle it and so set the temple on fire. When she was about to kill the man she thought responsible (her own brother), he said he was free from the curse but that Hikari would have to take over. And so she has been killing to protect the town ever since. Makoto still believes everyone can be happy though and follows Hikari when she runs off. She asks him to save her and then jumps off the edge of a cliff, he follows her to catch her.
12	"Along with the Wind"	September 15, 2004
Makoto and Hikari are saved somehow and now Hikari is remembering her meetings with Minamo's mother and the others. All the pieces are starting to fall into place. Makoto tells Hikari what he said to Minamo when they were kids and Hikari realizes what she needs to do. She tells Makoto how things have changed since she met all of them and then performs the Doukatai on herself. She disappears and the next day things seem to continue as normal. Makoto sees a girl that resembles Hikari (possibly the real Hikari herself), who later vanishes.
12.5	"Distant Feelings"	December 10, 2004
It's the school festival that day and everyone has something going on. Makoto and Tsutomu are having fun together until Shikouin has Tsutomu help her pass out fliers. Nozomi is in a play, Hinata is running a maze, and Wakaba and Minamo are both doing cafes. Later on, Minamo and Makoto go to see a play and, while leaving, run into Hikari. Hikari is no longer herself, however, but is now Aya. Makoto and Hikari seem to recognize each other, but later, when talking to Minamo, Makoto says he can't remember Hikari's face. She seems to have faded not just from everyone's memories but also from pictures as well. She now lives on a new life.
13	"Affection All Around (Special Story)"	September 22, 2004
This is a recap episode where Minamo remembers everything that happens up until the moment she finally confronts Makoto about her feelings for him.

=== OVAs ===
No.	Title	Original release date
1	"Reunion"	June 25, 2004
Makoto and Hinata move back to Kazune after being gone for ten years. They move because their mother has disappeared and that is the last thing she told Makoto to do. They reunite with only friends and meet new ones. Things seem to be going fine until Makoto encounters a strange girl on a train who seems to disappear into thin air. He also encounters an old friend he made a promise to long ago.
2	"Premonition"	August 25, 2004
Everyone gathers for the reunion party at the One Day cafe and Makoto introduces everyone to Minamo. Minamo's father has a talk with Makoto later on and tells him a very strange tale about his parents. While walking to school later on, he comes across the girl from the train but is unable to speak to her as the others plan a trip to the beach. While at the ocean, the mysterious girl appears and uses magic to try to drown Hinata. She is saved by the others though. Afterwards, when Makoto is picking up fireworks, he comes across Minamo's father who is injured and disappears into the air.
3	"Hope"	December 22, 2004
School gets canceled because of a typhoon but Makoto is worried about Minamo so he goes to find her. At the same time the others are worried about him and go to ask Hinata where he is. Makoto finds Minamo talking with the strange girl and protects her when the girl attacks. His friends arrive soon afterwards and they try to unravel the mystery of the town. When they finally track down the girl and confront her, they find out exactly why she is taking her revenge on the town.
4	"Soyokaze no Okurimono"	December 27, 2002
It's Christmas time, several months after the events of the anime. Tsutomu organizes a last minute Christmas party with everyone at the One Day cafe and Minamo promises to bake a special cake which sends shivers down the spines of Makoto and Hinata. But suddenly they see the Zeppelin floating in the sky above the town once again and strange things begin to happen.
