= Hiroko Taguchi =

Japanese voice actress

- 田口 宏子
- Born: March 29, 1974 (age 51); Kanagawa, Japan
- Other names: Sakura Takatsuki; Rika Fujiwara; Momiji Akizuki; Kōri Natsuno
- Years active: 1996–present
- Agent: Haikyō

Hiroko Taguchi (田口宏子, Taguchi Hiroko, born March 29, 1974), is a Japanese voice actress from Kanagawa Prefecture who is attached to Haikyo. She sometimes goes by several pseudonyms, including "Sakura Takatsuki (鷹月さくら, Takatsuki Sakura), Rika Fujiwara (藤原理加, Fujiwara Rika), Momiji Akizuki (秋月もみじ, Akizuki Momiji) and Kōri Natsuno (夏野こおり, Natsuno Kōri).

== Voice Roles ==
Bold denotes leading roles.

=== TV Animation ===
- ef: A Tale of Melodies. as Miyako Miyamura
- ef: A Tale of Memories. as **Miyako Miyamura**
- Fortune Arterial: Akai Yakusoku as **Haruna Yuuki**
- Hamtaro as Nijiham-kun (Prince Bo)
- Kyo Kara Maoh! as Gisela
- Lamune as Sakura Hiromi
- Steam Detectives as Ling Ling
- The Fruit of Grisaia as **Amane Suou**
- The Eden of Grisaia as Amane Suou
- Le Labyrinthe de la Grisaia as Amane Suou
- Yosuga no Sora as **Sora Kasugano**

=== OVA ===
- Aki Sora: Yume no Naka as **Aki Aoi**
- Ayumayu Gekijou as Kagami Sumika
- Beat Angel Escalayer as **Sayuka Kōenji**
- Moonlight Lady as Suzuna Kuraki (ep 5)

=== Internet Animation ===
- Ayumayu Gekijou as Kagami Sumika

=== Games ===
- Crayanne, Naive Woman, Energetic Girl (God Catching Alchemy Meister)
- Hermione (Azur Lane)
- Hinata Natsumi (Sharin no Kuni, Himawari no Shōjo)
- Kagami Sumika (Muv-Luv)
- Kagami Sumika (Muv-Luv Supplement)
- Kagami Sumika, 00 Unit (Muv-Luv Alternative)
- Kagami Sumika (All-age Muv-Luv)
- Kagami Sumika, 00 Unit (All-age Muv-Luv Alternative)
- Kamuchataaru (Utawarerumono Chiriyukumonotachi he no Komoriuta)
- Koyuki (¥120 Stories)
- Masamune Shizuru (Noble☆Works)
- Mitamura Akane (Kono Aozora ni Yakusoku wo-)
- Miyamura Miyako (Ef: The First Tale.)
- Miyamura Miyako (Ef: First Fan Disc)
- Monica Raybrant (Dark Chronicle)
- Nagisa Suzushiro (fortissimo EXA//Akkord:Bsusvier)
- Natsumi (¥120 Stories)
- Onomiya Yutsuki (Mashiroiro Symphony)
- Orie Lewak (Tenshi☆Souzou RE-BOOT!)
- Sakura Hiromi (Ramune)
- Sakura Hiromi (Ramune 〜Garasubin ni Utsuru Umi〜)
- Sakurano Yuu (Haru no Ashioto)
- Sakurano Yuu (Haru no Ashioto -step of spring-)
- Sakurano Yuu (Sakura no Saku Koro)
- **Sora Kasugano** (Yosuga no Sora)
- **Sora Kasugano** (Haruka na Sora)
- Suou Amane (Grisaia no Kajitsu)
- Sakurajousui Kurumi (Ijiwaru My Master)
- **Yarai Miu** (Dracu-riot!)
- Zofia (The Alchemist Code)
