= Tenmon (composer) =

Japanese composer

Tenmon (Japanese: 天門, Hepburn: TENMON; born 4 October 1971), also known as Atsushi Shirakawa (白川 篤史, Shirakawa Atsushi), is a Japanese music composer from Tokyo, Japan. He worked in the Nihon Falcom Corporation as one of the members of Falcom Sound Team J.D.K.. During his time with Falcom, he has composed much music for Falcom games, most notably Brandish.

Tenmon began collaborating with Makoto Shinkai, while working in Minori for the short film She and Her Cat. Tenmon created the soundtracks for Shinkai's subsequent films, including Voices of a Distant Star, The Place Promised in Our Early Days, 5 Centimeters Per Second, and Children Who Chase Lost Voices. As of 2019, Tenmon worked at CoMix Wave Films, but no further information is available about what he has done with them since. The news indicate that he will not work with Shinkai for Suzume. He subsequently left CoMix Wave Films along with his producer in 2023.

== Project Promise ==
In 2009, an album, titled "Promise" ("新海誠作品イメージアルバム「Promise」"), performed by the Eminence Symphony Orchestra, based in Sydney, Australia, was released, celebrating ten years of collaboration between Tenmon and Shinkai. It consists of orchestral arrangements of a variety of pieces composed by Tenmon appearing in a range of Shinkai's works.

== Works ==
Tenmon has composed the soundtrack for:

- She and Her Cat (1999)
- Voices of a Distant Star (2001)
- Mizu no Kakera (2001)
- Tenshi no Kakera (2003)
- Haru no Ashioto (2004)
- The Place Promised in Our Early Days (2004)
- Ef: A Fairy Tale of the Two. (2006) – with Eiichirō Yanagi
- 5 Centimeters Per Second (2007)
- Ef: A Tale of Memories. (2007) – with Eiichirō Yanagi
- Ef: A Tale of Melodies. (2008) – with Eiichirō Yanagi
- Eden* They Were Only Two, On The Planet (2009)
- Children Who Chase Lost Voices from Deep Below (2011)
- Hoshi Ori Yume Mirai (2014) – with many others
- 12 no Tsuki no Eve (2014) – with Eiichirō Yanagi
- Soreyori no Prologue (2015) – with Eiichirō Yanagi
- Tsumi no Hikari Rendezvous (2016) – with Eiichirō Yanagi
- Trinoline (2017) – with Eiichirō Yanagi
- Tsuredure Children (2017)
- Sono Hi no Kemono ni wa, (2019) – with Eiichirō Yanagi
- Link Click Season 1 (2021), and Season 2 (2023)
- Nixiao Biduan: Fengbao Xuqu (2026) – with Shinichiro Matsumoto

His other works include an original album Chronicle released in 2012.
