= CoMix Wave Films =

Japanese animation studio

CoMix Wave Films, Inc.

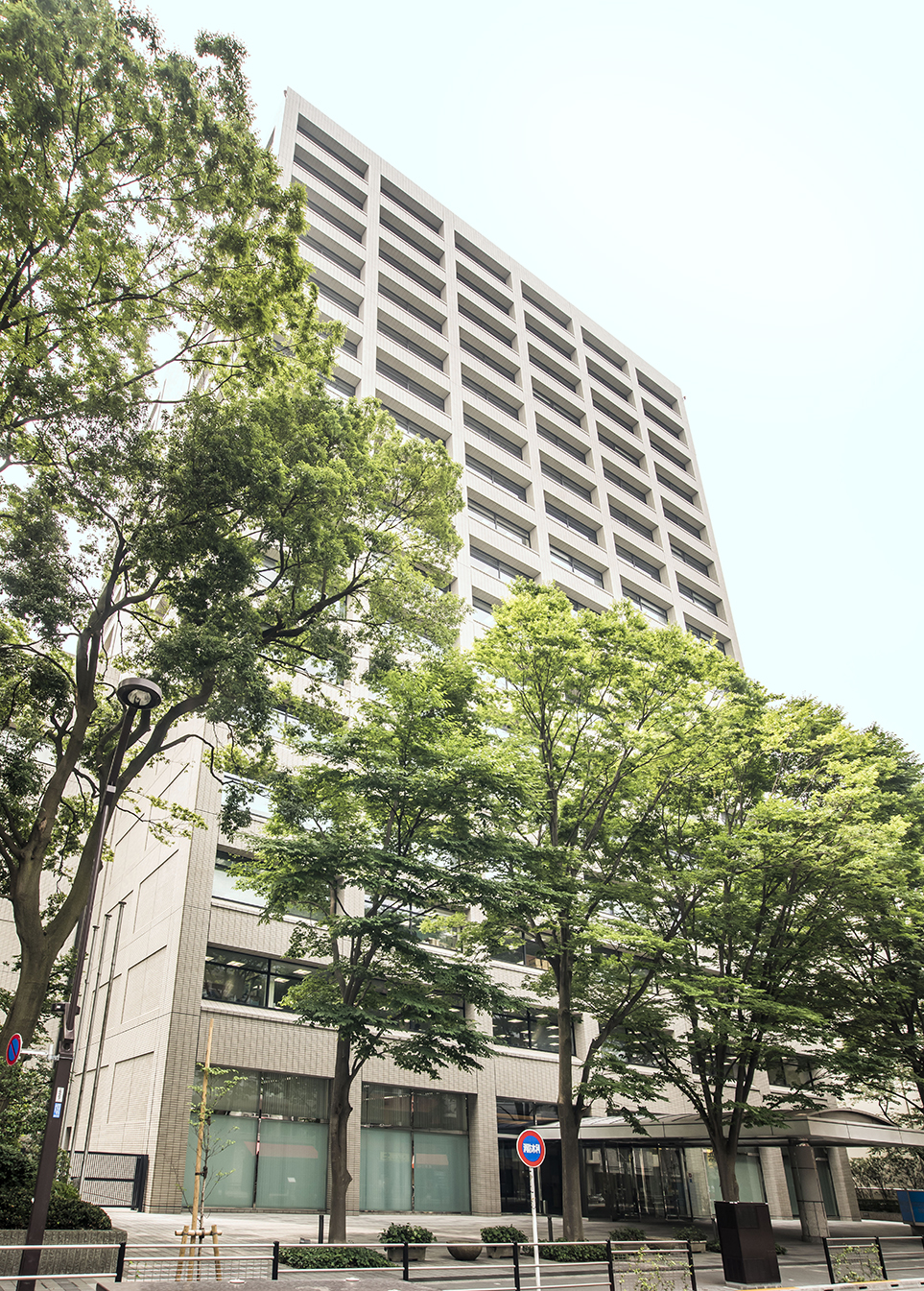
- Headquarters in Suginami, Tokyo
- Native name: 株式会社コミックス・ウェーブ・フィルム
- Romanized name: Kabushiki-gaisha Komikkusu Uēbu Firumu
- Type: Kabushiki kaisha
- Industry: Motion pictures (anime); TV commercials
- Predecessor: CoMix Wave Inc.
- Founded: March 2007; 19 years ago
- Headquarters: Ogikubo, Suginami, Tokyo, Japan
- Key people: Noritaka Kawaguchi (CEO); Kazuki Sunama (board member); Tomohiro Tokunaga (board member)
- Products: Animated feature films (anime), short films, commercials
- Total assets: ¥95.1 million (2017)
- Owner: Toho (6.09%)
- Website: www.cwfilms.jp

CoMix Wave Films, Inc. (Japanese: 株式会社コミックス・ウェーブ・フィルム, Hepburn: Kabushiki-gaisha Komikkusu Uēbu Firumu) is a Japanese independent animation film studio and distribution company based in Chiyoda, Tokyo, Japan. The studio is known for its anime feature films, short films, and television commercials, particularly those made by director Makoto Shinkai. It was founded in March 2007 when it split from CoMix Wave Inc., which was initially formed in 1998 from Itochu Corporation, ASATSU (now ADK), and other companies. On 15 October 2024, Toho announced that they'd acquired 45 shares or 6.09% of CoMix Wave Films.

== Productions ==
=== Anime television series ===
Year	Title	Director(s)	Original run start	Original run end	Eps.	Note(s)
2014	World Fool News	Yuu Mashimo	24 April 2014	3 July 2014	12	
2015	Peeping Life TV Season 1??	Ryōichi Mori	4 October 2015	20 December 2015	12	
2016	Tabi Machi Late Show: Awaiting My Journey	Yuu Numata	8 January 2016	29 January 2016	4	Anthology series, 8 minutes per episode.
2016	This Boy Is a Professional Wizard	Soubi Yamamoto	5 February 2016	26 February 2016	4	Anthology series, 10 minutes per episode.
2017	World Fool News Part II	Yuu Mashimo	2 April 2017	18 June 2017	12	

=== Anime films ===
Year	Title	Director(s)	Release date	Dur.	Note(s)
2004	The Place Promised in Our Early Days	Makoto Shinkai	20 November 2004	90m	As Comix Wave Inc. Original work, written by Makoto Shinkai.
2005	Negadon: The Monster from Mars	Jun Awazu	16 October 2005	30m	As Comix Wave Inc.
2006	Yonna in the Solitary Fortress	Kengo Takeuchi	8 April 2006	35m	As Comix Wave Inc.
2007	5 Centimeters per Second	Makoto Shinkai	3 March 2007	65m	Original work, written by Makoto Shinkai.
2009	Asylum Session	Takuto Aoki	25 July 2009	60m	
2010	Planzet	Jun Awazu	22 May 2010	55m	CGI production.
2011	Children Who Chase Lost Voices	Makoto Shinkai	7 May 2011	120m	Original work, written by Makoto Shinkai.
2013	Dareka no Manazashi	Makoto Shinkai	10 February 2013	6m	Short film.
2013	The Garden of Words	Makoto Shinkai	31 May 2013	50m	Original work, written by Makoto Shinkai.
2016	Your Name	Makoto Shinkai	3 July 2016	110m	Original work, written by Makoto Shinkai.
2018	Flavors of Youth	Li Haoling; Jiaoshou Yi Xiaoxing; Yoshitaka Takeuchi	4 August 2018	20m 30m 30m	Three short films (The Rice Noodles, A Little Fashion Show, Love in Shanghai). Co-production with Haoliners Animation League
2019	Weathering with You	Makoto Shinkai	19 July 2019	115m	Original work, written by Makoto Shinkai.
2022	Suzume	Makoto Shinkai	11 November 2022	122m	Original work, written by Makoto Shinkai.
2026	Shiranui	Ryō Katanosaka	21 August 2026	36m	Original work, written and hand-drawn by Ryō Katanosaka.

=== Original video animations ===
Year	Title	Director(s)	Release start	Release end	Eps.	Note(s)
1999	She and Her Cat	Makoto Shinkai	1999		1	As Comix Wave Inc. 5-minute short.
2002	Voices of a Distant Star	Makoto Shinkai	2 February 2002		1	25-minute OVA.
2011	Peeping Life: The Perfect Evolution	Ryōichi Mori	27 January 2011		10	5-minute shorts.
2011	Peeping Life: The Perfect Extension	Ryōichi Mori	23 September 2011		10	5-minute shorts.
2012	Peeping Life 5.0ch	Ryōichi Mori	3 February 2012		10	5-minute shorts.
2012	Peeping Life: The Perfect Explosion	Ryōichi Mori	18 October 2012		10	5-minute shorts.
2012	Kono Danshi, Ningyo Hiroimashita	Soubi Yamamoto	9 November 2011		1	30-minute OVA.
2013	Peeping Life: Tezuka Pro, Tatsunoko Pro Wonderland	Ryōichi Mori	25 June 2013		10	5-minute shorts.

=== Original net animations ===
Year	Title	Director(s)	Release start	Release end	Eps.	Note(s)
2006	Hoshizori Kiseki	Akio Watanabe; Toshikazu Matsubara	10 July 2006		1	30-minute ONA.
2021	Oshiete Hokusai! The Animation	Naoto Iwakiri	7 March 2021	14 March 2021	10	Based on a manga by Naoto Iwakiri.
2025	Kairyū to Yūbinya-san	Taku Kimura	27 February 2025	TBA	TBA	Based on the Pokémon franchise.
