= Haru no Ashioto =

2004 video game

- Developers: Minori (Windows); HuneX (PS2)
- Publishers: Minori (Windows); Alchemist (PS2)
- Platforms: Windows, PlayStation 2
- Release: Windows: JPN: July 23, 2004; PlayStation 2: JPN: April 6, 2006
- Genres: Eroge (Windows), Visual novel

Haru no Ashioto (はるのあしおと, lit. "Footstep Of Spring") is a Japanese adult visual novel by Minori released on July 23, 2004. A PlayStation 2 port, Haru no Ashioto -Step of Spring- (はるのあしおと -Step of Spring-), was released on April 6, 2006, and a fandisc, Sakura no Saku Koro (さくらのさくころ), was released on March 31, 2006. The deluxe Step of Spring Paku Paku Pack comes with puppets of the three main heroines (Yuzuki, Yū, and Nagomi). Also, the Paku Paku Pack box is exceptionally big (about twice the size of the PlayStation 2's). The opening movie was done by Makoto Shinkai. The game is set in a small town in the fictional Mefukino (芽吹野), Japan, to which the protagonist returns after his experiences in Tokyo.

== Main characters ==
Tatsuki Sakurano (桜乃樹, Sakurano Tatsuki)
Yuzuki Kaede (楓ゆづき, Kaede Yuzuki)
Voiced by: Natsumi Yanase
Yū Sakurano (桜乃悠, Sakurano Yū)
Voiced by: Hiroko Taguchi
Nagomi Fujikura (藤倉和, Fujikura Nagomi)
Voiced by: Junko Okada
Chika Shinomiya (篠宮智夏, Shinomiya Chika)
Voiced by: Kumiko Nishihara

=== Fandisc ===
The fandisc Sakura no Sakukoro -Haru no Ashioto Pleasurable Box- was released on March 31, 2006. The fandisc featured an after story, short stories set in the timeline of the original game and other additional content. It also featured an original video animation titled Haru no Ashioto the Movie: Ourin Dakkan. The OVA featured an original story where the sub-heroine Kusunoki-sensei takes the school and the main characters must confront her.
