= Voices of a Distant Star =

2002 Japanese film by Makoto Shinkai

- ADV Film's Region 1 DVD cover

ほしのこえ (Hoshi no Koe)
- Genre: Action; Science fiction; Romance
- Original video animation
- Directed by: Makoto Shinkai
- Produced by: Makoto Shinkai
- Written by: Makoto Shinkai
- Music by: Tenmon
- Studio: CoMix Wave Inc.
- Licensed by: AUS: Madman Entertainment; NA: GKIDS; UK: Anime Limited
- Released: February 2, 2002
- Runtime: 25 minutes
- Light novel
- Written by: Waku Ōba
- Illustrated by: Makoto Shinkai; Kou Yaginuma
- Published by: Media Factory
- Imprint: MF Bunko J
- Published: July 25, 2002
- Manga
- Written by: Makoto Shinkai
- Illustrated by: Mizu Sahara
- Published by: Kodansha
- English publisher: NA: Vertical
- Imprint: Afternoon KC Deluxe
- Magazine: Monthly Afternoon
- Original run: February 25, 2004 – December 25, 2004
- Volumes: 1
- icon

Voices of a Distant Star (Japanese: ほしのこえ, Hepburn: Hoshi no Koe; lit. 'Voice of the Stars') is a Japanese science fiction original video animation (OVA) short film created and animated by Makoto Shinkai. It follows the lives of two close childhood friends, a boy and a girl, who are separated when the girl is sent into space to fight in a war against aliens. As the 15-year-old girl goes deeper and deeper into space, the texts she sends take longer to reach the Earth; the film simultaneously follows her battles and the boy's life as he receives her texts over the years.

The OVA premiered in Japan in February 2002 in an advance screening. It was followed by two DVD releases on April 19 and October 6, 2002. ADV Films licensed the OVA for release in North America and the United Kingdom, Madman Entertainment licensed it for Australasia, and Anime Limited licensed it for the United Kingdom. In 2002, it won the Animation Kobe award for packaged work. It also won the 2003 Seiun Award for Best Media. It was very positively received by critics, who praised its artistic dimension, plot, and music; the English-language version, however, was criticized for its dubbing.

The OVA was adapted into a drama CD by Pioneer LDC and a novel was written by Waku Ōba, illustrated by Makoto Shinkai and Kou Yaginuma, and published by Media Factory's imprint MF Bunko J. A manga adaptation, created by Makoto Shinkai and illustrated by Mizu Sahara, was serialized in Kodansha's seinen manga magazine Monthly Afternoon from February to December 2004, and later released as one tankōbon volume on February 23, 2005. The manga was licensed for a North American release by Tokyopop, which published it on August 1, 2006. It was released on Crunchyroll on December 3, 2025.

== Plot ==
A schoolgirl named Mikako Nagamine (Mika Shinohara (original Japanese), Sumi Muto (Japanese), Cynthia Martinez (English)) is recruited into the UN Space Army to fight in a war against a group of aliens called the Tarsians—named after the Tharsis region of Mars where they were first encountered. As a Special Agent, Mikako pilots a giant robotic mecha called a Tracer as part of a fighting squadron attached to the spacecraft carrier Lysithea. When the Lysithea leaves Earth to search for the Tarsians, Mikako's friend Noboru Terao (Makoto Shinkai (original Japanese), Chihiro Suzuki (Japanese), Adam Conlon (English)) remains on Earth. The two continue to communicate across space using the e-mail facilities on their mobile telephones. As the Lysithea travels deeper into space, messages take increasingly longer to reach Noboru on Earth, and the time-lag of their correspondence eventually spans years.

The narrative begins in 2047. Mikako is apparently alone in a hauntingly empty city, trying to contact people through her mobile telephone. She wakes up in her Tracer orbiting an extrasolar planet. She then goes to Agartha, the fictional fourth planet of the Sirius Solar System. Mikako sends an e-mail to Noboru (which shows the date 2047-09-16), with the subject "I am here", which would reach him eight years later. Some flashes of imagery, perhaps indicative of memory, a hallucination, or even a mystical encounter, are then shown. The room shown at the beginning of the animation is presented again; Mikako is squatting in the corner, sobbing and pleading with her doppelganger to let her see Noboru again so she can tell him she loves him.

The ship's alarm warns Mikako that the Tarsians are surrounding her, but she does not understand. A climactic battle ensues. On Earth, Noboru receives the message almost nine years later. At Agartha, three of the four carriers equipped with the warp engines which brought the expeditionary force to Sirius have been destroyed. The Lysithea is still intact after Mikako joins the fight and stops its destruction. After winning the battle, Mikako lets her damaged Tracer drift in space.

In the manga, 16-year-old Mikako sends a message to 25-year-old Noboru, telling him that she loves him. By this time, Noboru himself has joined the UN, which has launched a rescue mission for the Lysithea. When Mikako hears that the UN is sending help for their rescue, she consults a list of people on the mission, and finds that Noboru is among them. The manga ends with Mikako saying that they will definitely meet again.

== Production ==
Screenshots of places in Japan used in the animation of Voices of a Distant Star

Voices of a Distant Star was written, directed and produced by Makoto Shinkai on his Power Mac G4 using LightWave, Adobe Photoshop 5.0, Adobe After Effects 4.1 and Commotion 3.1 DV software. Around June 2000, Shinkai drew the first picture for Voices—of a girl holding a mobile telephone in a cockpit.

Shinkai said the OVA was inspired by Dracula and Laputa. He stated that production took seven months to complete. He said another inspiration was his frequent sending of text messaging to his wife when he was working. Shinkai cited the availability of digital hardware and software tools for image production at his workplace, Falcom, and friends' view that individual film production could occur because of the improvement of consumer electronics.

Makoto and his then girlfriend, Mika Shinohara, provided the voice acting for the working dub. A second Japanese dub was later created for the DVD release with professional voice actors. Makoto's friend Tenmon, who had worked with Makoto's video game company, provided the soundtrack. The song and film were created together in sync during storyboarding. Sometimes, the timing of the animation had to be changed to match the music.

I think it's because of the theme of the story—communication between people. I used cell phones in the story because that is what is commonly used in Japan to communicate, but there are many countries where people don't use cell phones. Communication from the heart is ever-lastingly important wherever you are, so I assume that is why it appealed to so many people. The other thing that is appealing is that I created this animation by myself. The mass media reported on the man who created anime by himself. I'm looking forward to more people doing things this way and seeing an emergence of independent animators, whether it's individuals or small groups.

— Makoto Shinkai on the appeal of Voices of a Distant Star, Newtype USA

The ending theme to the OVA, "Through the Years and Far Away (Hello, Little Star)", was composed by Tenmon, with lyrics written by K. Juno and sung by Low.

== Media ==
=== OVA ===
The Voices of a Distant Star OVA was directed, written and produced by Makoto Shinkai. Shinkai and his fiancé, Mika Shinohara, provided the voices of the characters for the original video. The OVA was released for an advanced screening in February 2002. Yoshihiro Hagiwara produced the DVD release, and the voice actors were Chihiro Suzuki and Sumi Mutoh. CoMix Wave Inc. released it on DVD on April 19, 2002. A DVD Book version of the story was released by Tokuma Shoten on October 6, 2002.

In July 2002, ADV Films announced it had licensed Voices of a Distant Star for a North American release. Steven Foster, director of ADV Films, directed the dubbing of the film into English, with voices provided by Adam Conlon and Cynthia Martinez. ADV Films released the North American DVD on June 10, 2003. On June 30, 2003, ADV recalled the North American DVDs because they failed to include the original Japanese tracks made by Shinkai and Shinohara. ADV Films UK released the DVD in the United Kingdom on November 17, 2003. ADV Films UK also released a Shinkai Collection DVD set, containing Voices of a Distant Star and The Place Promised in Our Early Days, on September 3, 2007. Anime Limited has since taken over ADV Film's license for the film and has announced DVD and Blu-ray twin-pack releases of Voices of a Distant Star and The Place Promised in Our Early Days in the UK. The film was licensed in Australasia by Madman Entertainment, which released the DVD on October 15, 2003.

The film was licensed in France by Kazé, in Italy by D/visual, in Russia by XLM Media, in Taiwan by Proware Multimedia International. Crunchyroll streamed the film for free for 48 hours beginning on March 5, 2010, to celebrate Shinkai as director. On March 10, 2022, GKIDS announced that they have licensed Voices of a Distant Star, along with three other works by Makoto Shinkai, for North American home video release in 2022; the film was included as a bonus feature on the Blu-ray release of 5 Centimeters per Second on June 7.

=== Other ===
A drama CD was released by Pioneer LDC on June 25, 2002. A novel was adapted from the OVA by Waku Ōba and illustrated by Makoto Shinkai and Kou Yaginuma. The novel was published by Media Factory's imprint MF Bunko J on July 25, 2002. A second novel, Words of Love/Across the Stars, was written by Arata Kanoh and initially released in 2006, although it would not get an English translation and release by Vertical until 2019.

The OVA was adapted into a manga by Makoto Shinkai and illustrated by Mizu Sahara. It was serialized in Kodansha's seinen manga magazine Monthly Afternoon starting in the April 2004 issue on February 25, 2004, and concluding in the February 2005 issue on December 25, 2004. Kodansha collected its ten chapters in one tankōbon volume, released on February 23, 2005. The manga was licensed for a North American release by Tokyopop, which published the manga on August 1, 2006. The manga was also licensed in Italy by D/visual, in Germany by Egmont Manga & Anime and in Portugal by Panini Comics. The manga was re-licensed in English by Vertical in February 2017, and released in digital and print format on February 20, 2018.

== Reception ==
Voices of A Distant Star has received the Special Prize at the 6th Japan Media Arts Festival. It has also won the Animation Kobe for packaged work in 2002 and the 2003 Seiun Award for best media. The film was listed 100th on DVD Verdict's Top 100 DVD Films list.

Anime News Network's Jonathan Mays criticized Steven Foster's dubbing of the film. He said, "Foster carelessly omits critical details, completely rewrites some scenes, misinterprets emotions, and even adds new dialogue where the original track had silence". In an Anime News Network interview, Foster said he "made some changes to make the jokes more accessible". Mays also said, "The animation is breathtaking. Shinkai's backgrounds have very few equals. The character designs look uninspired, but paired with the animator's beautifully realized worlds, the generic appearance fades into the magnificence of the scene." He said Shinkai's use of lighting is "masterful", "incredibly realistic" and conveys the characters' moods well. He called the characters "unoriginal". DVD Verdict's Rob Lineberger commended the music, saying "the simple score infuses the animation with meaning. Solitary piano notes are sluggish, as though the pianist lacked the enthusiasm needed to pick up his fingers. When the action kicks in, it arrives with a sonic punch from 5.1 speakers. Rockets scream around you, birds move overhead, engines thrum quietly in your wake. The soundtrack does what it is supposed to do: transport you to another world".

THEM Anime Review's Carlos Ross said, "The voice-acting is remarkable, the directing is solid, and music is quite competent. But the real kicker here is the animation quality, which actually equals (and sometimes exceeds) that of excellent television series like Vandread and Full Metal Panic! ... there is a remarkable amount of storyline; the plot is well-written and executed, and never gets a chance to be too drawn out. And Shinkai gives equal time to the slick action sequences and the well-handled, genuinely touching romance". IGN's A.E. Sparrow said, "While [the film] was visually one of the best pieces of eye-candy I have seen in a year or so, it's ultimately a voice track over a sequence of pretty pictures. Don't get me wrong, it was absolutely beautiful, but it left me wanting more". Mania's Chris Beveridge commended ADV Films for obtaining the original computer files that were used to create it. He said, "the transfer here is simply gorgeous. Colors are amazingly lush and deep, saturated without bleeding. Cross coloration is non-existent and only a few very minor areas of aliasing occur. The only real 'flaw' that I could see with this transfer is during some of the panning sequences up and down, there's a slight stutter that's simply inherent in the materials". DVDs Worth Watching's Johanna Draper Carlson said, "the character designs are familiar and uninspired, and the cross-cutting choppy".

=== Manga ===
IGN's A.E. Sparrow said that compared with the film, the manga has "a healthy amount of additional storylines, characters and dialogue". He also said, "Mizu Sahara's artwork brings a bit of clarity to scenes that might have come off as muddled in the anime". Anime News Network's Theron Martin said the manga has "strong storytelling which carries good emotional appeal, fleshes out the original anime" but said it "unnecessarily adds on to the ending", and that "character designs were not Shinkai's strong point, and Sahara's are only a slight improvement".

Manga Worth Reading's Johanna Draper Carlson said, "the art is denser than in many manga, with toned backgrounds anchoring the drawn world. Faces are often in shadow, suggesting separation and loss." Pop Culture Shock's Melinda Beasi wrote, "the manga is absolutely beautiful. The art is nicely detailed and very expressive, and the panel layouts, including the placement and style of dialogue and narrative text, make the story visually interesting and easy to follow". She also said, "Sahara also spends more time exploring both Mikako's and Noboru's feelings about Mikako's appointment to the Lysithea, which is very revealing for both characters". Mania.com's Sakura Eries said, "there's not a lot of detail in the backgrounds, the mecha designs are dull, and the warp scenes, which were so spectacular in the anime, don't make much of an impact".
