= Junko Okada =

Japanese voice actress

- 岡田 純子
- Born: おかだ じゅんこ; May 23, 1973 (age 52); Kanie, Ama District, Aichi, Japan
- Other name: Okajun (おかじゅん)
- Occupations: voice actress, sound director
- Years active: 1995–present
- Notable work: Sentimental Graffiti (as Taeko Adachi)

Junko Okada (岡田 純子, Okada Junko) is a Japanese voice actress from Aichi, Kanie, Japan employed by Genki Project.

== Voice roles ==
- Ef: A Tale of Memories. as Kei Shindō
- Getbackers as nurse (ep 35)
- Haru no Ashioto as Nagomi Fujikura
- Kodocha as Rumiko Yokota (ep 88)
- Sentimental Graffiti series as Adachi Taeko
- Wind: A Breath of Heart as Nozomi Fujimiya
- Zegapain as Fosetta/Fosetta II

== Dubbing ==
- The Amazing World of Gumball
