= Ef: A Fairy Tale of the Two =

Japanese visual novel and anime series

- Ef: A Fairy Tale of the Two PlayStation 2 cover, which combines Ef: The First Tale and Ef: The Latter Tale into one game
- Manga
- Written by: Mikage; Yū Kagami
- Illustrated by: Juri Miyabi
- Published by: ASCII Media Works
- Magazine: Dengeki Comic Gao! (former); Dengeki Daioh
- Original run: April 2005 – March 2015
- Volumes: 10
- Light novel

Ef: A Fairy Tale of the Two Another Tale
- Written by: Mikage; Yū Kagami
- Illustrated by: Naru Nanao; 2C Galore; Mitsuishi Shōna
- Published by: Kadokawa Shoten
- Magazine: Comptiq
- Original run: July 2006 – July 2008
- Volumes: 1
- Video game
- Developer: Minori
- Publisher: JP: Minori (Windows); JP: Comfort (PS2); EU: MangaGamer (Windows)
- Genre: Eroge, Visual novel
- Platform: Windows, PlayStation 2
- Released: Windows; The First Tale: JP: December 22, 2006; EU: July 27, 2012; The Latter Tale: JP: May 30, 2008; EU: December 20, 2013; PlayStation 2: JP: April 29, 2010
- Anime television series

Ef: A Tale of Memories
- Directed by: Shin Oonuma
- Produced by: Akio Matsuda (Warner Bros. Japan); Eiji Kazuma; Kozue Kaneniwa (Movic); Mitsuteru Shibata (Frontier Works); Mitsutoshi Kubota (Shaft)
- Written by: Katsuhiko Takayama
- Music by: Tenmon; Eiichirō Yanagi
- Studio: Shaft
- Licensed by: AUS: Hanabee; NA: Sentai Filmworks; UK: MVM Films
- Original network: Chiba TV; TV Kanagawa
- English network: US: Anime Network
- Original run: October 7, 2007 – December 22, 2007
- Episodes: 12
- Light novel
- Written by: Yū Kagami
- Illustrated by: Kinusa Shimotsuki
- Published by: Fujimi Shobo
- Published: October 25, 2007
- Volumes: 2
- Anime television series

Ef: A Tale of Melodies
- Directed by: Shin Oonuma
- Produced by: Akio Matsuda (Warner Bros. Japan); Eiji Kazuma; Kozue Kaneniwa (Movic); Mitsuteru Shibata (Frontier Works); Mitsutoshi Kubota (Shaft)
- Written by: Katsuhiko Takayama
- Music by: Tenmon; Eiichirō Yanagi
- Studio: Shaft
- Licensed by: AUS: Hanabee; NA: Sentai Filmworks; UK: MVM Films
- Original network: TV Kanagawa
- English network: US: Anime Network
- Original run: October 7, 2008 – December 23, 2008
- Episodes: 12

Ef: A Fairy Tale of the Two is a Japanese two-part adult visual novel series by Minori for Windows and PlayStation 2. The first game in the series, Ef: The First Tale, was released on December 22, 2006, and the second game, Ef: The Latter Tale, was released on May 30, 2008. The opening video for the game was animated by Makoto Shinkai, and a majority of the music was produced by Tenmon, who has worked in the past with Shinkai and Minori. Female character design was by Naru Nanao of Da Capo fame, while male character design was by 2C Galore.

Before the release of Ef: The First Tale, a manga based on the overall story was serialized between 2005 and 2015 starting in Dengeki Comic Gao, but later transferred to Dengeki Daioh. In addition, a light novel was serialized in Kadokawa Shoten's Comptiq from July 2006 to July 2008. A 12-episode anime adaptation titled Ef: A Tale of Memories was produced by Shaft and aired between October and December 2007. A second season of the anime titled Ef: A Tale of Melodies aired 12 episodes between October and December 2008.

On September 26, 2010, it was announced that MangaGamer had acquired the rights of the visual novel for a worldwide English release, in partnership with the translation group No Name Losers. The English version of the two games were released in 2012 and 2013, with a physical edition containing both on separate DVD-ROMs being released in 2014. Sentai Filmworks licensed both Ef anime series for American distribution.

== Gameplay ==
Example of an average conversation in Ef: A Fairy Tale of the Two. Here, Hiro is talking with Miyako.

The gameplay requires little interaction from the player as most of the duration of the game is spent simply reading the text that appears on the screen which represents either dialogue between the various characters or the inner thoughts of the protagonist. The player has a chance to assume the role of four protagonists, two in each Ef: The First Tale and Ef: The Latter Tale. Each protagonist is paired with a heroine, and each scenario in the original PC versions of the visual novels includes scenes with sexual content. These scenes are removed or modified in the PlayStation 2 port.

Every so often, the player will come to a point where he or she is given the chance to choose from multiple options. The time between these points is variable and can occur anywhere from a minute to much longer. Gameplay pauses at these points and depending on which choice the player makes, the plot will progress in a specific direction. There are four main plot lines that the player will have the chance to experience, one for each of the heroines in the story. The plot lines carry on from each other in a linear fashion. The game can end prematurely if the player makes the wrong decisions. When this occurs, the player must go back to a previously saved spot and choose different decisions.

For Ef, Minori attempted to create a movie-like experience, using a lot of animated two-dimensional computer graphics presented from various angles. Instead of presenting the visuals straight-on with a character's image in the middle of the screen and the character being the main focus, the character images in the Ef series are off-center and appear closer to "event" computer graphics (CGs) in typical visual novels. These types of CGs occur at certain pivotal times in a visual novel's story and are meant to be artistic and much more detailed than normal visuals.

== Plot and characters ==
Ef: A Fairy Tale of the Two consists of two parts. The first part is titled Ef: The First Tale and primarily consists of the story of Hiro Hirono, Miyako Miyamura, Kyosuke Tsutsumi, Kei Shindo, and Yuko Amamiya. It consists of a prologue and two main chapters with Miyako as the focus for the first chapter, and Kei for the second. This is followed by the second part of the story, Ef: The Latter Tale, which primarily deals with the story of Renji Aso, Chihiro Shindo, Shuichi Kuze, Mizuki Hayama, and Yu Himura. The second part consists of two more main chapters and an ending chapter, with Chihiro as the focus for the third chapter, and Mizuki for the fourth. Bringing the two parts together forms the all-encompassing Ef: A Fairy Tale of the Two. The story is set in the town Otowa (音羽).

=== Ef: The First Tale ===
Yuko Amamiya (雨宮 優子, Amamiya Yūko; voiced by: Yumiko Nakajima (Japanese), Carli Mosier (English)), a mysterious girl dressed like a nun, and Yu Himura (火村 夕, Himura Yū; voiced by: Kōichi Tōchika (Japanese), David Matranga (English)), a mysterious gentleman who is somehow attached to the church where Yuko first appears, are having a reunion in a church during Christmas time. Despite her attire, Yuko is not affiliated with the church. She always appears generally out of nowhere, and disappears just as quickly in various places throughout the story to talk with Hiro or other characters and give them advice. Yuko and Yu reminisce about the past and remember events of the previous year around the same time at the beginning of the first chapter of the story. Yuko hints of events that are revealed throughout Ef: A Fairy Tale of the Two. After the conclusion of the first chapter, the story cycles back to the prologue and the talk between Yuko and Yu. Yuko ends with her talk about the events in the first chapter. At the end of the second chapter, the story shifts again to the scene with Yuko and Yu. Yuko finishes her talk on the events from the second chapter and says that she misses talking to Hiro, Kyosuke, and their friends. Their talk ends with allusions to the continuation of the story, Ef: The Latter Tale.

The first chapter's protagonist is Hiro Hirono (広野 紘, Hirono Hiro; voiced by: Hiro Shimono (Japanese), Greg Ayres (English)), an already established manga author despite still attending high school. Due to the pressures of his work, he often skips school and puts most of his time into his job as a manga artist of shōjo manga under the pseudonym "Nagi Shindo" (新堂 凪, Shindō Nagi). Writing manga causes him to lose interest in school and focuses mainly on his work in order to earn an income, as usually he does not have much money as it is. While out one Christmas night, a purse snatcher rushes past Hiro on a bike and soon Miyako Miyamura (宮村 みやこ, Miyamura Miyako; voiced by: Hiroko Taguchi (Japanese), Luci Christian (English)) appears, chasing after the purse thief, taking Hiro's bike without asking to pursue the culprit. She ends up destroying his bike, and later hangs out with him for the rest of the night.

Hiro later meets Miyako again at school, and learns that she is a student of the same year there, but in a different class; she too does not attend classes much because she finds them boring. Miyako has an energetic personality and enjoys doing unorthodox things. She eventually starts to become attracted to Hiro after they start spending more time together, but during this time Hiro's childhood friend Kei Shindo (新藤 景, Shindō Kei; voiced by: Junko Okada (Japanese), Brittney Karbowski (English)) begins to feel left out and a love triangle develops between the three students. She is attracted to Hiro, and becomes jealous when she finds out how much time he is spending with Miyako Miyamura. Hiro and Miyako eventually become a couple, despite Kei's feelings for him.

The second chapter begins several months after the end of the first. It is now summer, and the story focuses on a new protagonist named Kyosuke Tsutsumi (堤 京介, Kyōsuke Tsutsumi; voiced by: Yūki Tai (Japanese), Chris Patton (English)). Kyosuke is an acquaintance of Hiro's and happens to be in the same grade and school. He has a passion for filming, and constantly carries a digital video recorder around with him. On Christmas night, he saw Kei Shindo, who is the main heroine of the second chapter, running down the street and tried to get a shot of her, but a truck passed by, so he could not get a clean shot of the mystery girl. After thinking about the mystery girl, he ends up quitting the film club and agrees with his girlfriend, Emi Izumi (voiced by: Kaori Nobiki (Japanese), Allison Sumrall (English)), to break up.

One day, while filming near the gymnasium, Kyosuke catches sight of Kei practicing basketball for her school's girls' basketball team and becomes infatuated by her image. He desires to cast Kei in an amateur film he is making for an upcoming film festival. Occupied with thoughts of Kei, he sets out determined to get closer to Kei by becoming better friends with Hiro, Kei's childhood friend. Kei is one year younger than Hiro and she attends the same school as him too. After being asked to be cast in one of his films, Kei initially refuses Kyosuke's offer, but agrees to watch some of his previous films. While initially put off by the films, she eventually comes to like aspects of his work. After hanging out together more, the two eventually fall in love and go out together.

=== Ef: The Latter Tale ===
Ef: The Latter Tale begins once again with Yuko Amamiya and Yu Himura in the middle of a reunion in a church during Christmas time. Yuko tells Yu how she has influenced people in two separate stories (from Ef: The First Tale). After she is done with this, she asks him to tell her about the people he has influenced. Yu starts to tell his first story, that of Chihiro Shindo; the third chapter begins. Like Yuko, Yu also abruptly appears out of nowhere and disappears just as mysteriously. He often gives advice and warnings to Renji and others. Yu is close to Chihiro and takes care of her. After the conclusion of the third chapter, the story goes back to Yuko and Yu with Yu ending his recount of the third chapter, and goes on to talk about how he and Yuko were separated in the past. Yu starts his recount of the events from the fourth chapter. At the end of the fourth chapter, the story shifts one final time back to Yuko and Yu. Up to this point the two have been recounting individual tales to each other. The meaning of the overall title Ef: A Fairy Tale of the Two is revealed to be in connection with Yuko and Yu.

Like the first chapter, the third chapter is also set in winter, but now focuses on another protagonist named Renji Aso (麻生 蓮治, Asō Renji; voiced by: Motoki Takagi (Japanese), Clint Bickham (English)) who is half German, half Japanese. One day, he goes to an abandoned train station in town he would often frequent to read at since it is so quiet there and meets a girl wearing an eyepatch over her left eye and sitting alone named Chihiro Shindo (新藤 千尋, Shindō Chihiro; voiced by: Natsumi Yanase (Japanese), Monica Rial (English)). Chihiro is the younger twin sister of Kei Shindo from Ef: The First Tale and the main heroine of the third chapter in the story. Despite them being mutually shy, Renji comes back to see her at the station every day after school and quickly becomes friends with her. Renji later learns that she has a severe case of anterograde amnesia, where she can only remember 13 hours' of memory at a time, aside from the events before the accident that led to her current state, which she can recall perfectly. Now, she carries a diary with her which she writes in every day the events of that day so that the next day, after she had forgotten everything, she will be able to remind herself of what happened the previous day. Ironically, she has a fantastic memory of anything that happened that is less than thirteen hours old.

Renji also finds out that it is her dream to write a fantasy novel, but due to her condition has never been able to get far. Renji loves to read novels, and after discussing it with Chihiro, he collaborates with her to see if he can finally make her dream come true. Through the process of writing the novel, the two eventually become very close and they fall in love with each other. As the story progresses and more of the novel is written, Renji soon discovers that the novel is an allegory for Chihiro's life and how she sees the world around her due to the state of her limited memory.

Shuichi Kuze (久瀬 修一, Kuze Shūichi; voiced by: Kenji Hamada (Japanese), Illich Guardiola (English)) is the main protagonist of the fourth chapter in the story. He is an older man who is a professional violinist. He had been studying abroad in Germany for a time, and comes back to where Ef's story takes place. Shuichi is a neighbor of Renji's and is good friends with him despite the age difference. Shuichi knows Yu Himura and Chihiro as well, but she forgets Shuichi due to her condition. He meets the main heroine from the fourth chapter of the story named Mizuki Hayama (羽山 ミズキ, Hayama Mizuki; voiced by: Mai Goto (Japanese), Hilary Haag (English)) after being introduced by Renji's mother. She goes to an affiliated school and admires Kei greatly as someone who is older than she is; in fact, Mizuki is also on her school's girls' basketball team. She greatly enjoys reading shōjo manga. She has a straightforward attitude and likes to be frank towards others, especially to Kei. She initially comes to Otowa to visit her older cousin Renji, and this is when she meets Shuichi. Shuichi keeps to himself that he is dying of a special case of neurosis, of which Mizuki is aware of, but even though she tries to get closer to him, he forcibly pushes her away and rejects her affections. Mizuki becomes depressed and obtains Chihiro's diary. Casually reading it, she finds Yu's name which she recognizes from her past. Mizuki goes to the church to find Yu, but the chapter ends shortly after.

== Development and release history ==
Planning for Ef started in 2004 headed by Nobukazu Sakai (also known as nbkz), who is the main producer for Minori. The director for Ef was Mikage, who was also one of the main scenario writers along with Yū Kagami. Character design for Ef was headed by two artists, Naru Nanao who drew the female characters, and 2C Galore who drew the males. The opening movie animation was done via a collaboration between the animation studio Ajia-do Animation Works and Makoto Shinkai. Music in the Ef series was provided by Tenmon, who was the sole composer for Ef: The First Tale, and was accompanied by Eiichirō Yanagi for additional music used in Ef: The Latter Tale. It cost Minori over 100 million yen to produce the Ef series.

A fan disc entitled Ef: First Fan Disc was initially released during Comiket 72 between August 11 and August 13, 2007; the disc, playable on a PC was later sold in retail stores starting on August 25, 2007. The disc, unlike the normal visual novels in the series, did not contain adult content, and offered a glimpse into the world of Ef, though only touched on points from Ef: The First Tale, the first game in the series. Ef: The First Tale was released as an adult game for the PC on December 22, 2006. The second game in the series, Ef: The Latter Tale was released on May 30, 2008. MangaGamer released both games in English: Ef: The First Tale was released on July 27, 2012 and Ef: The Latter Tale was released on December 20, 2013.

A game demo of Ef: The First Tale is available via a free download at Getchu.com's special website for Ef: The First Tale. A second fan disc entitled Ef: Second Fan Mix, released as a preview of Ef: The Latter Tale, was initially released at during Comiket 73 on December 29, 2007; the disc, playable on a PC, was later sold in retail stores starting on February 8, 2008. A PlayStation 2 port combining The First Tale and The Latter Tale was released on April 29, 2010, published by Comfort. A fan disc titled Tenshi no Nichiyōbi "Ef: A Fairy Tale of the Two" Pleasurable Box. (天使の日曜日 "ef - a fairy tale of the two" Pleasurable Box.) was released on September 17, 2010.

== Adaptations ==
=== Print media ===
A manga adaptation titled Ef: A Fairy Tale of the Two began serialization in the April 2005 issue of the shōnen manga magazine Dengeki Comic Gao! sold on February 27, 2005, published by MediaWorks. The manga ended serialization in the April 2008 issue Dengeki Comic Gao! at 35 chapters, but continued serialization in the June 2008 issue of ASCII Media Works' manga magazine Dengeki Daioh sold on April 21, 2008. After a lengthy hiatus, the manga ended serialization in the March 2015 issue. The story was written by Mikage and Yū Kagami, two scenario writers of Minori, and illustrated by Juri Miyabi. Ten tankōbon volumes were published under ASCII Media Works' Dengeki Comics imprint between February 27, 2006, and January 27, 2015.

A series of 24 short side-stories in a light novel form were serialized under the title Ef: A Fairy Tale of the Two Another Tale in Kadokawa Shoten's seinen magazine Comptiq between the July 2006 and July 2008 issues sold on June 10, 2006, and June 10, 2008, respectively. The stories are written by the same scenario staff as with the original games and manga, and illustration is handled by Naru Nanao, 2C Galore, and Mitsuishi Shōna. The chapters of Another Tale were released in a single volume on February 27, 2009, entitled Another Tales.. Another two separate light novels, under the general title Ef: A Fairy Tale of the Two, were published by Fujimi Shobo on October 25, 2007. They were written by Yū Kagami, and illustrated by Kinusa Shimotsuki. The first novel was a novelization of Miyako's route, and the second was centered around Kei's route.

The Ef series, encompassing the visual novels and anime adaptation, was the only Minori title to receive coverage in an entire issue of Dengeki G's Festival! Deluxe, a special edition version of Dengeki G's Magazine which is published by ASCII Media Works; the issue in question was the first, and was published on November 30, 2007. Along with information pertaining to Ef: A Fairy Tale of the Two and Ef: A Tale of Memories, the magazine came bundled with an ergonomic mousepad, a small cell phone cleaner which can also attach to a cell phone, and an ID card/pass case.

=== Radio shows and drama CDs ===
There are two Internet radio shows for Ef: A Fairy Tale of the Two The first, entitled Omoshiro Minori Hōsōkyoku (おもしろミノリ放送局), was broadcast between October 13, 2006, to June 1, 2007, every Friday and was produced by Onsen, Cospa, and Minori. The show contained thirty-three episodes and was mainly used to promote the visual novels. In this way, the promotion mainly entailed news about the series and any updates related to the visual novels while also discussing points about the games themselves. The second radio broadcast began on June 8, 2007, called Yumiko & Yūna no Ef Memo Radio (ゆみこ&ゆうなのえふメモらじお). This broadcast is mainly used to promote the anime series which entails reporting on updates related to the anime and goods for the anime including musical CDs or DVDs.

A set of four drama CDs were released by Frontier Works based on the series between October 2006 and April 2007. A special edition drama CD was released on November 21, 2007, and another special drama CD was released on January 1, 2008. The first print release of the special edition CD will contain comments from the cast. The drama CDs used the same female cast as with the games and anime versions (albeit under assumed names), but the two males that appeared in the dramas, Hiro and Kyosuke, had different voice actors in respect to the anime version. Hiro was voiced by Takashi Komitsu, and Kyosuke was by Kakeru Shiroki.

=== Anime ===
On August 24, 2007, a short prologue for an Ef anime series was released as a DVD. The prologue was a teaser which introduced the characters and some conflict that would appear in the series. The anime series, under the title Ef: A Tale of Memories, aired 12 episodes on Chiba TV between October 7 and December 22, 2007. The anime was produced by Shaft and directed by Shin Oonuma who volunteered for the job when it was offered. Even though the script for Ef: The Latter Tale was finished at the time of the anime's production, in order to direct the anime from the viewer's standpoint, Shin Oonuma himself never read it. However, Katsuhiko Takayama, who wrote the screenplay for the anime, had read the script. Each episode ends with a still image drawn by Japanese illustrators of anime, manga, and visual novels. The first letter in each episode's title, plus the "coda" title of the last episode, can be brought together to form "Euphoric Field". The series was released in six limited and regular edition DVD compilations, each containing two episodes. The first DVD volume was released on December 7, 2007, and the sixth DVD was released on May 9, 2008. A second season entitled Ef: A Tale of Melodies aired 12 episodes between October 7 and December 22, 2008, in Japan. The license holding company Sentai Filmworks licensed both Ef anime series. The DVD and Blu-ray Disc box sets of Ef: A Tale of Memories were released on January 31, 2012, in North America with an English dub, and the Ef: A Tale of Melodies box sets were released on March 20, 2012.

== Music ==
The opening theme song for Ef: The First Tale is "Yūkyū no Tsubasa" (悠久の翼, Eternal Feather) by Hitomi Harada which was released as a maxi single called "Eternal Feather" on October 27, 2006. For Ef: The Latter Tale, the opening theme is "Emotional Flutter", and the ending theme is "Ever Forever"; the single containing the two themes was released on April 11, 2008. Ef: A Fairy Tale of the Two's original soundtrack, Alato, was released on February 27, 2009, containing three CDs. The PlayStation 2 version released by Comfort will include an image song CD in the game disc, which will contain a song called "Echt Forgather" by Hitomi Harada.

The opening theme for Ef: A Tale of Memories, starting with episode three, is the English version of "Euphoric Field" by Tenmon featuring Elisa. The first episode used a background music track for the opening theme, and the second and tenth episodes had no opening theme; the English version of "Euphoric Field" was also used for the ending theme in episode two. The Japanese version of "Euphoric Field" was used as the opening theme for the twelfth episode. The opening theme single was released on October 24, 2007, by Geneon. The first ending theme for the anime is "I'm here" by Hiroko Taguchi which was used for episodes one, three, seven, and ten; the single for the song (entitled "Adagio by Miyako Miyamura") was also released on October 24, 2007, by Geneon. The second ending theme, "Kizamu Kisetsu" (刻む季節, Carving Season) by Junko Okada, was used for episodes four, five, and nine, and the single (entitled "Vivace by Kei Shindo") was released on November 21, 2007. The third ending theme, "Sora no Yume" (空の夢, Sky's Dream) by Natsumi Yanase, was used for episode six, eight, and eleven, though the second verse of the song was used in that episode; the single (entitled "Andante by Chihiro Shindo") was released on December 21, 2007. A remix of the visual novel's theme song called "Yūkyū no Tsubasa 07.mix" (悠久の翼 07.mix, Eternal Feather 07.mix) sung by Yumiko Nakajima was used as the ending theme in episode twelve. The single for this (entitled "Yūkyū no Tsubasa 07.mix / Euphoric Field live.mix") was released on September 26, 2008. The first original soundtrack for the anime series (Espressivo) was released on February 8, 2008, and the second (Fortissimo) was released on April 2, 2008.

The opening theme of Ef: A Tale of Melodies is the English version of "Ebullient Future", also by Tenmon featuring Elisa, with the sixth episode featuring the instrumental version and episode eleven with the second verse. The opening sequence is shown to change many times; episode ten contains no opening, but a piano remix of the song was used as the ending for that same episode. Episode twelve uses the Japanese version of the song, with a different opening sequence. The first ending theme is called "Egao no Chikara" (笑顔のチカラ, Strength of Smiles) by Mai Goto and was used in episode two through five, seven, and the second verse was used in episode eleven. The second ending theme is called "Negai no Kakera" (願いのカケラ, Pieces of Wish) by Yumiko Nakajima which was used in episode six, nine, and the second verse was used in episode eight. The song "A moon filled sky." by Mai Goto was featured at the end of episode eleven and a new Japanese version of the opening sequence of the first season was inserted in the same episode. Episode twelve uses the song "Ever Forever OG.mix" sung by the voice actresses of all the major female characters. The singles for "Ebullient Future" and "Egao no Chikara" (the latter entitled "Fermata by Mizuki Hayama") were released on November 5, 2008, and the single for "Negai no Kakera" (entitled "Fine by Yuko Amamiya") was released on November 26, 2008. The first original soundtrack for the series (Elegia) was released on December 26, 2008, while the second original soundtrack (Felice) was released on February 27, 2009.

== Reception ==
In the October 2007 issue of Dengeki G's Magazine, poll results for the fifty best bishōjo games were released. Out of 249 titles, Ef: A Fairy Tale of the Two ranked 23rd with 11 votes, tying with Muv-Luv Alternative and Snow. The first game in the Ef series, Ef: The First Tale, was the highest selling game for the month of December 2006 on Getchu.com, and dropped to 19th in the ranking the following month. Also, Ef: The First Tale was the fourth most widely sold game of 2006 on Getchu.com despite it being released with a little over a week left in 2006. In the January 25, 2007 issue of the Japanese gaming magazine PC News, it was reported that Ef: The First Tale was the fifth-highest selling game of 2006 with 40,843 units sold. Across the national ranking of bishōjo games in amount sold in Japan, Ef: The First Tale premiered at number two, and ranked twice more at number five and 32. From mid-April to mid-May 2008, Ef: The Latter Tale ranked fourth in national PC game pre-orders in Japan. Ef: The Latter Tale ranked first in terms of national sales of PC games in Japan in May 2008, and ranked at 30th on the same ranking the following month.

Theron Martin of Anime News Network reviewed the Blu-ray edition of Ef: A Tale of Memories, where he praised the anime series for not resorting to "even a whiff of the supernatural", and called the way in which characters behave as "largely believable". The anime received a mostly positive review from Bradley Meek THEM Anime Reviews. Bradley appreciated the animation, saying that "It does wonders for the mood in the series, adding a tangible layer of mysticism and fantasy." However, he criticized the series being "cheesy and melodramatic more often than not." He concluded the review saying, "Despite some laughable melodrama, the raw emotions and Shaft's hypnotic animation makes ef ~a tale of memories~ a memorable romance. The plotting is slow, though, so it's not for people with short attention spans."
