= Makoto Shinkai =

Japanese filmmaker and animator (born 1973)

- 新海 誠
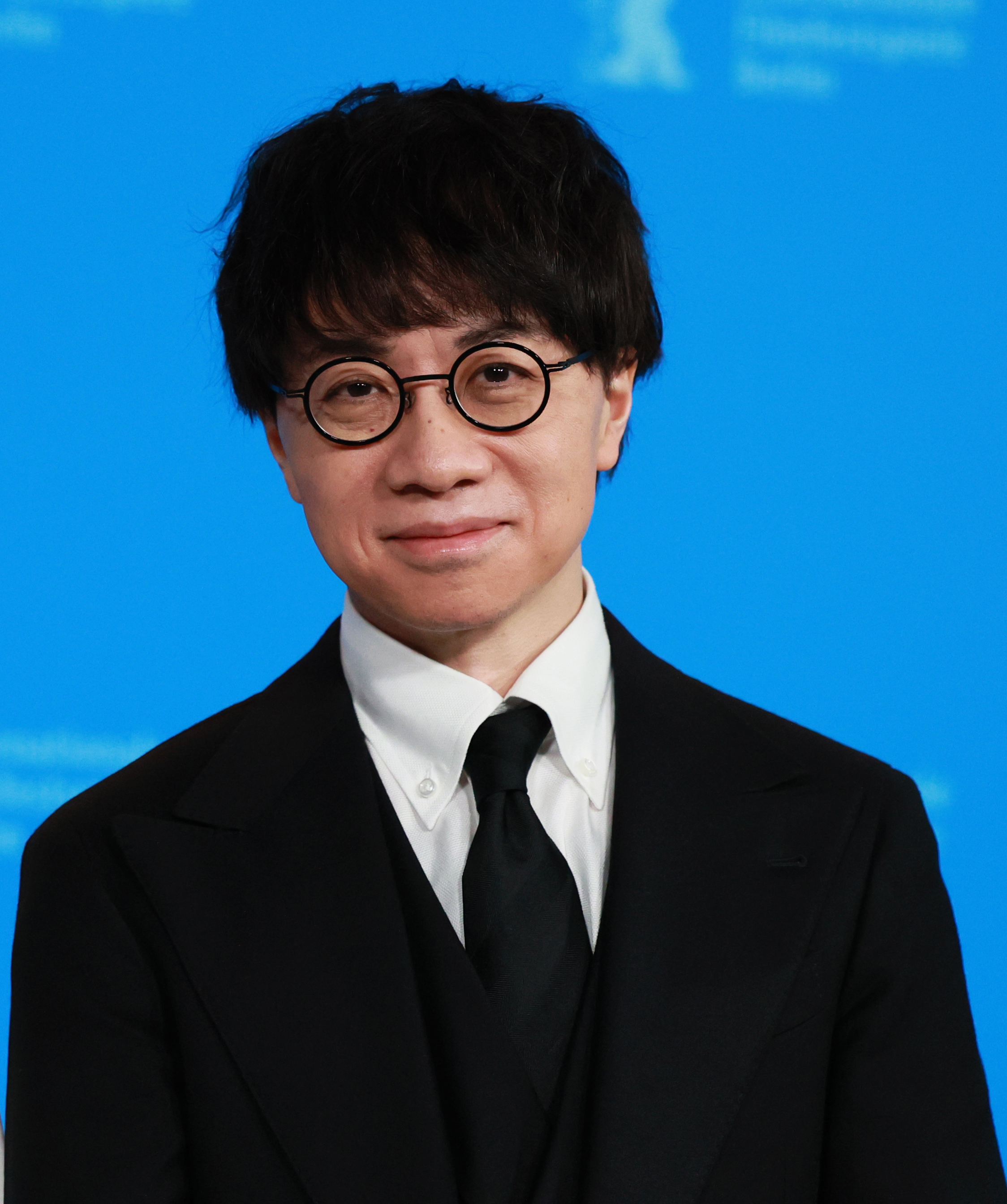
- Shinkai at the 73rd Berlin International Film Festival in 2023
- Born: Makoto Niitsu; February 9, 1973 (age 53); Koumi, Japan
- Education: Chuo University
- Occupations: Screenwriter; Storyboard artist; Animator; Film editor; Film director; Novelist; Manga artist (only one short manga)
- Years active: 1996–present
- Known for: Your Name (2016); Weathering with You (2019); Suzume (2022)
- Spouse: Chieko Misaka
- Children: Chise Niitsu

Japanese name
- Kanji: 新海 誠
- Kana: しんかい まこと
Transcriptions
- Romanization: Shinkai Makoto
- Website: shinkaiworks.com

Makoto Niitsu (新津 誠, Niitsu Makoto; born February 9, 1973), known as Makoto Shinkai (新海 誠, Shinkai Makoto), is a Japanese filmmaker and novelist. A founder of CoMix Wave Films, he is known for his anime feature films enriched with visually-appealing animation and romantic stories depicting teenagers and high school students.

Shinkai began his career as a video game animator with Nihon Falcom in 1996, and gained recognition as a filmmaker with the release of the original video animation (OVA) She and Her Cat (1999). Shinkai then released the science fiction OVA Voices of a Distant Star in 2002 as his first feature with CoMix Wave, followed by his debut feature film The Place Promised in Our Early Days (2004).

Shinkai's films have consistently received highly positive reviews from both critics and audiences, and he is considered to be one of Japan's most commercially successful filmmakers. His three most recent films Your Name (2016), Weathering with You (2019), and Suzume (2022), collectively known as his Disaster Trilogy, are all among the highest-grossing Japanese films of all time, both in Japan and worldwide at the time of their release.

== Early life ==
Makoto Shinkai was born in Koumi, Nagano. His family runs a construction company. Shinkai studied Japanese literature at Chuo University, where he was a member of the juvenile literature club and drew picture books. Shinkai traces his passion for creation to the manga, anime and novels he was exposed to in middle school.

== Career ==
=== 1996–2000: Early career ===
After graduating from Chuo University Faculty of Literature in March 1996, Shinkai got a job at Nihon Falcom, a video game company. He worked there for 5 years, making video clips for games and graphic design, including web content. During this time Shinkai met musician Tenmon, who later scored many of his movies.

In 1999, Shinkai released She and Her Cat, a five-minute short piece done in monochrome. It won several awards, including the grand prize at the 12th DoGA CG Animation Contest (2000). The short details the life of a cat, entirely from the cat's perspective, as it passes time with its owner, a young woman.

=== 2000–2016: Rise in prominence ===
After winning the grand prize, Shinkai began thinking about a follow-up while he continued working for Falcom. In June 2000, Shinkai was inspired to begin working on Voices of a Distant Star by drawing a picture of a girl in a cockpit grasping a mobile phone. Sometime later, he was contacted by Manga Zoo (today a smartphone app), which offered to work with him, giving him a grant to turn his idea into an anime they could sell. In May 2001, Shinkai quit his job at Falcom and began to work on Voices of a Distant Star. In an interview, Shinkai noted that production took around seven months of "real work".

Voices of a Distant Star was followed by the 90-minute The Place Promised in Our Early Days, which was released in Japan on November 20, 2004. It was critically acclaimed, winning many honors. Shinkai's next project was 5 Centimeters per Second, which premiered on March 3, 2007, and consists of three short films: Cherry Blossom, Cosmonaut, and 5 Centimeters per Second. In September 2007, Nagano's leading newspaper, Shinano Mainichi Shinbun, released a TV commercial animated by Shinkai.

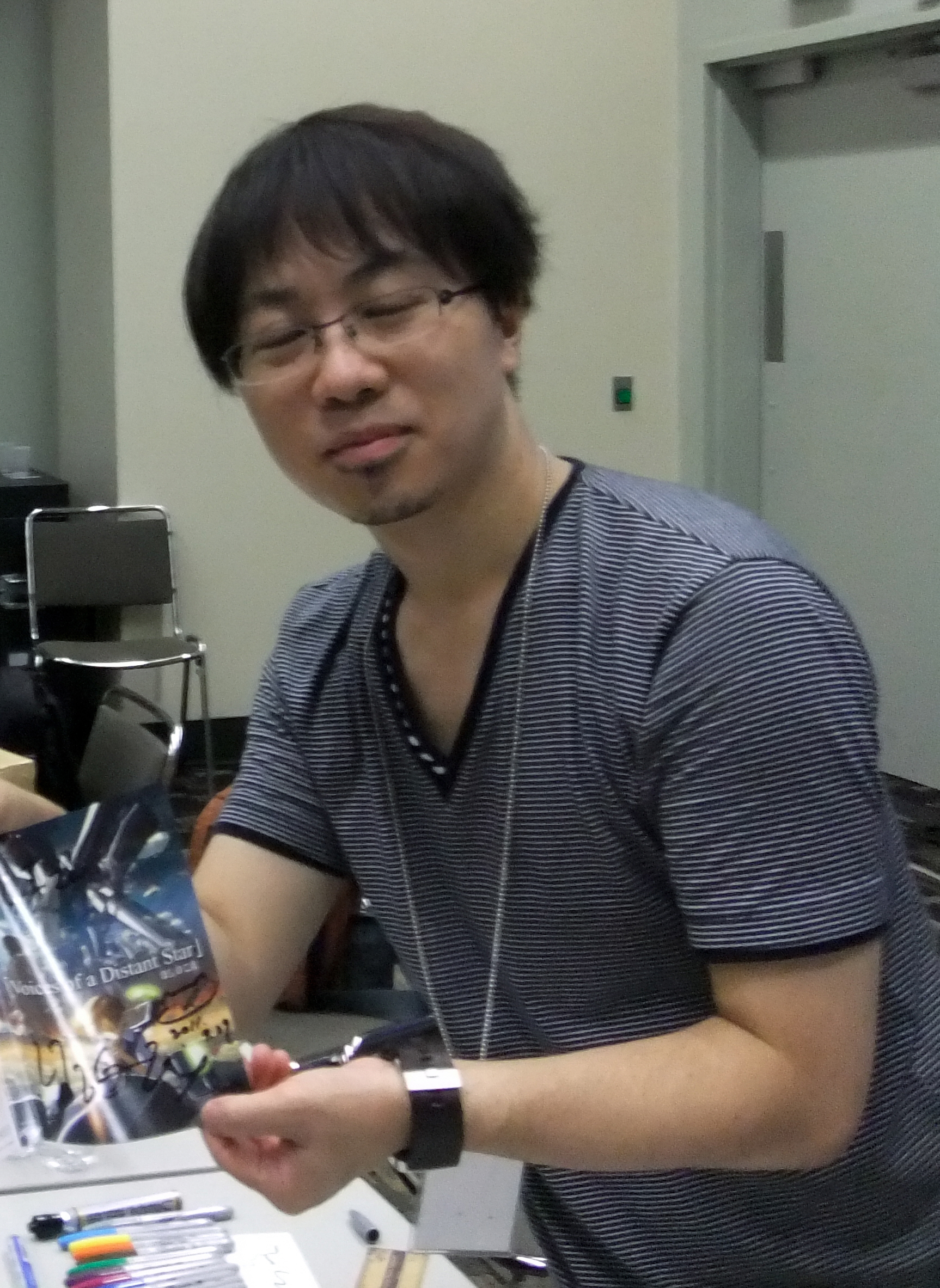
Shinkai at the Otakon Anime Convention in 2011

Shinkai spent 2008 in London, resting after the completion of 5 Centimeters per Second. He returned to Japan in 2009 to start work on his next project. He released two concept drawings for this film in December 2009. Shinkai noted that it would be his longest animation film to date and described the story as a "lively" animated film with adventure, action, and romance centered on a cheerful and spirited girl on a journey to say "farewell". In November 2010, he revealed that his next work would be titled Children Who Chase Lost Voices from Deep Below. A teaser trailer was released on November 9, and the film was released on May 7, 2011.

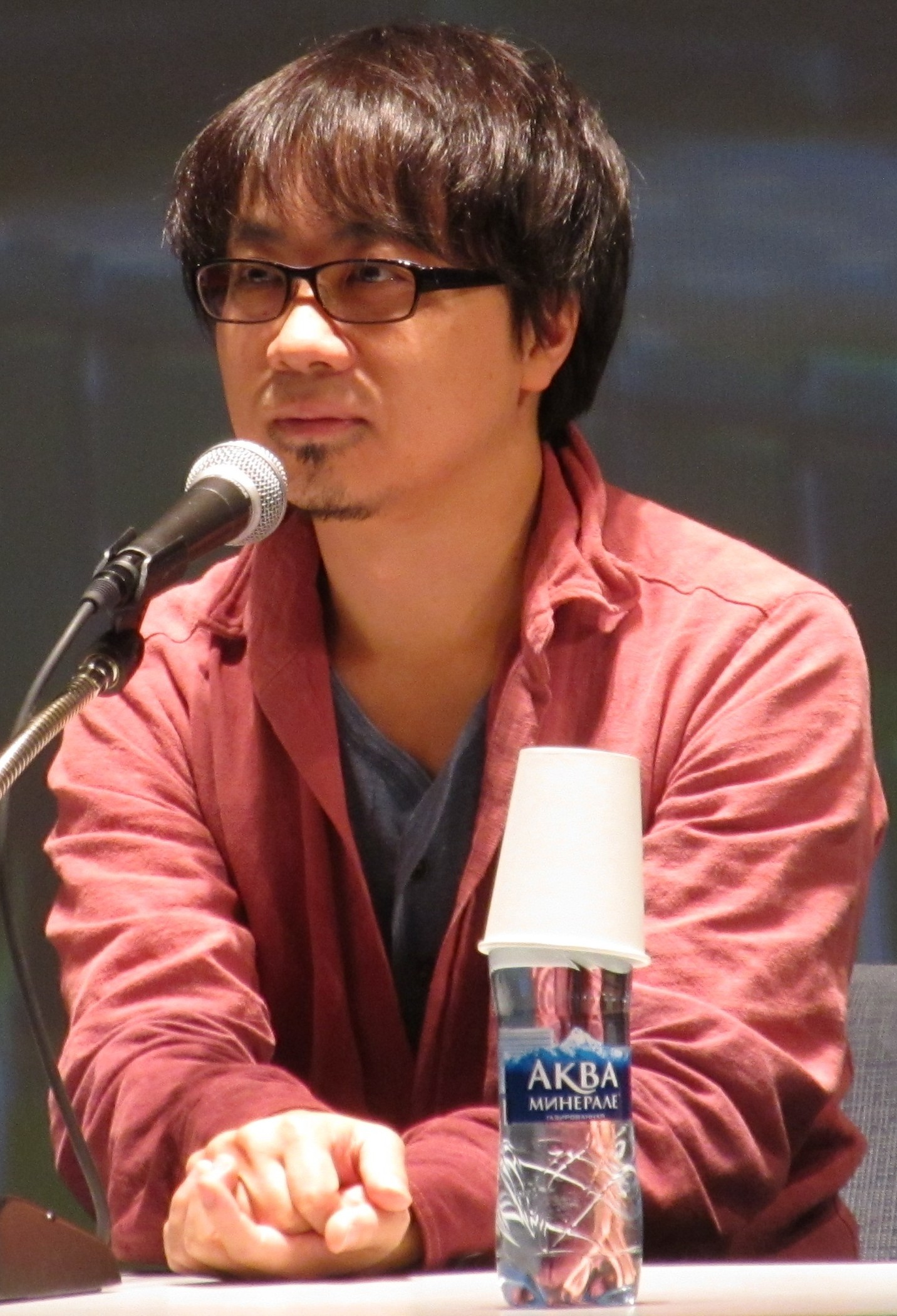
Shinkai in 2013

His next feature, The Garden of Words, was released on May 31, 2013.

=== 2016–2022: Disaster Trilogy ===
On August 26, 2016, Shinkai released Your Name. The film received widespread acclaim from audiences and critics, praising the film for its narrative, imagery, animation, music, emotional weight, and skillful use of post-postmodernist themes. The film was also a commercial success, becoming the sixth-highest-grossing film of all time in Japan. By 2019, the film became the highest-grossing anime film of all time, overtaking Hayao Miyazaki's Spirited Away.

Shinkai's next film, Weathering with You, was released in Japan on July 19, 2019. The film was also a commercial success, grossing US$193.8 million worldwide and becoming the tenth-highest-grossing Japanese film of all time.

Suzume, Shinkai's seventh feature-length film, was released in Japan on November 11, 2022. The film was a further critical and commercial success, grossing over US$300 million worldwide.

== Personal life ==
Shinkai is married to retired actress and producer Chieko Misaka, who is best known for starring in Versus; the couple has a daughter, child actress Chise Niitsu, who was born in 2010.

His favorite anime films are Castle in the Sky, Nausicaä and The Castle of Cagliostro by Hayao Miyazaki, The End of Evangelion by Hideaki Anno, and Patlabor 2: The Movie by Mamoru Oshii.

An asteroid, 55222 Makotoshinkai, is named after him.

== Filmography ==
=== Films ===
Title	Year	Credited as			
Title	Year	Writer	Producer	Actor	Other
The Place Promised in Our Early Days (雲のむこう、約束の場所 Kumo no Mukō, Yakusoku no Basho)	2004	Yes	Yes	Yes	Storyboards; Background art; Design; Theme song lyrics
5 Centimeters per Second (秒速5センチメートル Byōsoku Go-Senchimētoru)	2007	Yes	Yes	Yes	Storyboard; Art director; Color design
Children Who Chase Lost Voices (Note: Also known as Children Who Chase Lost Voices from Deep Below or Journey to Agartha.) (星を追う子ども Hoshi o Ou Kodomo)	2011	Yes	Yes	Yes	Cinematography; Editing
The Garden of Words (言の葉の庭 Kotonoha no Niwa)	2013	Yes	Yes		Photography; Color design; Editing
Your Name (君の名は。 Kimi no Na wa)	2016	Yes	Yes		Photography; Color design; Editing
Weathering with You (天気の子 Tenki no Ko)	2019	Yes	Yes		Photography; Color design; Editing
Suzume (すずめの戸締まり Suzume no Tojimari)	2022	Yes	Yes		Editing

==== Short films ====
Title	Year	Credited as				Notes
Title	Year	Writer	Producer	Actor	Other	Notes
The World Be Enclosed (囲まれた世界 Kakomareta Sekai)	1998	Yes			Animator	
Other Worlds (遠い世界 Tōi Sekai)	1998	Yes			Animator	
She and Her Cat (彼女と彼女の猫 Kanojo to Kanojo no Neko)	1999	Yes	Yes		Animator	Her cat (Voice over)
Voices of a Distant Star (ほしのこえ Hoshi no Koe)	2002	Yes	Yes	Yes	Animator	Noboru Terao (Voice over)
Minna no Uta: "Egao" (みんなのうた「笑顔」)	2003	Yes				
Someone's Gaze (だれかのまなざし Dareka no Manazashi)	2013	Yes	Yes			

=== Video games ===
Title	Year	Credited as		Notes
Title	Year	Director	Animator	Notes
The Legend of Heroes III: Song of the Ocean	1999	Yes (Opening)		As Makoto Niitsu
Ys II Eternal	2000	Yes (Opening)		As Makoto Niitsu
Ys I Complete	2001	Yes (Opening)		As Makoto Niitsu
Bittersweet Fools	2001	Yes (Trailer & Opening)		
Wind: A Breath of Heart	2002	Yes (Trailer & Opening)	Yes	
Haru no Ashioto	2004	Yes (Trailer & Opening)		
Ef: A Fairy Tale of the Two	2006; 2008	Yes (Trailer & Opening)		

=== Commercials ===
Title	Year	Credited as			Notes
Title	Year	Director	Editor	Other	Notes
Bosphorus Tunnel (ボスポラス海峡トンネル, Bosuporasu Kaikyō Ton'neru)	2011	Yes		Background art	TV commercial released by Taisei Corporation
Sri Lanka Highway (スリランカ高速道路, Suriranka Kōzokudōro)	2013	Yes	Yes	Storyboards; Photography	TV commercial released by Taisei Corporation, featuring the theme song "Fight" (ファイト, Faito) by Anri Kumaki
Vietnam Noi Bai Airport (ベトナム・ノイバイ空港, Betonamu Noibai Kūkō)	2014	Yes	Yes	Storyboards; Shooting	TV commercial released by Taisei Corporation
Z-Kai: Cross Road (Z会 「クロスロード」, Z-Kai Kurosu Rodo)	2014	Yes		Storyboards; Screenplay; Production; Supervision	TV commercial released by Z-Kai
Thomson–East Coast MRT Line (MRTトムソン・イーストコースト線, MRT Tomuson īsuto Kōsuto-sen)	2018	Yes	Yes	Storyboards	TV commercial released by Taisei Corporation
New Yangon Specialist Hospital (ヤンゴン新専門病院, Yangon Shin Senmon Byōin)	2020	Yes	Yes	Storyboards	TV commercial released by Taisei Corporation

=== Literary works ===
Title	Year	Publisher	Notes
Slug	1994	—N/a	Picture-book
5 Centimeters per Second	2007	Media Factory	Novel
The Garden of Words	2014	Kadokawa Shoten	Novel
Your Name	2016	Kadokawa	Novel
Your Name. Another Side: Earthbound	2016	Kadokawa	Light novel; co-written with Arato Kanou.
Weathering with You	2019	Kadokawa	Novel
Suzume	2022	Kadokawa	Novel

=== Manga ===
Title	Year	Publisher(s)	Notes
Beyond the Tower	2002	—N/a	
Voices of a Distant Star	2004	Kodansha	Illustrated by Mizu Sahara
The Place Promised in Our Early Days	2005–06	Kodansha	Illustrated by Mizu Sahara
5 Centimeters per Second	2010–11	Kodansha; Vertical, Inc. (English)	Illustrated by Yukiko Seike
Children Who Chase Lost Voices from Deep Below	2011	Media Factory	
The Garden of Words	2013	Kodansha; Vertical, Inc. (English)	Illustrated by Midori Motohashi
Your Name	2016	Media Factory	Illustrated by Ranmaru Kotone
Weathering with You	2019–20	—N/a	Illustrated by Watari Kubota
Suzume	2022–23	Kodansha	Illustrated by Denki Amashima

=== Illustrations ===
- I Dream to Protect You (きみを守るためにぼくは夢をみる, Kimi o Mamoru Tame ni Boku wa Yume o Miru) — Illustrator (2003–2011)

== Accolades ==
Shinkai has been called "The New Miyazaki" in several reviews, including those by Anime Advocates and ActiveAnime—comparisons that Shinkai brushed off as "overestimation".

Year	Award	Category	Work/Nominee	Result	Ref.
2003	8th AMD Award	Best Director	Voices of a Distant Star	Won	
2016	29th Tokyo International Film Festival	Arigatō Award	Your Name	Won	
2016	41st Hochi Film Award	Best Director	Your Name	Nominated	
2016	29th Nikkan Sports Film Award	Best Director	Your Name	Won	
2017	44th Annie Awards	Outstanding Achievement for Directing in an Animated Feature Production	Your Name	Nominated	
2017	59th Blue Ribbon Awards	Best Director	Your Name	Nominated	
2017	11th Asian Film Awards	Best Screenplay	Your Name	Nominated	
2017	40th Japan Academy Prize	Director of the Year	Your Name	Nominated	
2017	Tokyo Anime Award Festival 2017	Best Director	Your Name	Won	
2017	26th Japan Movie Critics Awards	Best Animation Director	Your Name	Won	
2018	2nd Crunchyroll Anime Awards	Anime of the Year (Best Film)	Your Name	Won	
2020	47th Annie Awards	Outstanding Achievement for Directing in an Animated Feature Production	Weathering with You	Nominated	
2020	47th Annie Awards	Outstanding Achievement for Writing in an Animated Feature Production	Weathering with You	Nominated	
2020	Tokyo Anime Award Festival 2020	Best Director	Weathering with You	Won	
2023	Celebration of Cinema and Television	International Animation Award	Suzume	Won	
2024	51st Annie Awards	Outstanding Achievement for Storyboarding in a Feature Production	Suzume	Nominated	
2024	51st Annie Awards	Outstanding Achievement for Writing in an Animated Feature Production	Suzume	Nominated	
2024	8th Crunchyroll Anime Awards	Best Film	Suzume	Won	
