= List of manga publishers =

Manga publishers (worldwide)

This article lists publishers of manga in various markets worldwide.

== Chinese ==
=== Traditional Chinese ===
- Tong Li Comics (Taiwan)
- Ever Glory Publishing (Taiwan)
- Sharp Point Publishing (Taiwan)
- Jade Dynasty (Hong Kong)
- Jonesky (Hong Kong)

=== Simplified Chinese ===
- ChuangYi Publishing (Singapore）

== Danish ==
- Faraos Cigarer
- Fahrenheit

=== Defunct ===
- Forlaget Carlsen
- Egmont Serieforlaget
- Mangismo
- Alpha Entertainment

== Dutch ==
- Glénat
- Kana

== English ==
=== Active (digital and print) ===
- Animate
- Antarctic Press (Mainly original English-language manga)
- Bento Books
- Blast Books
- BluPetal
- Dark Horse Manga
- DC Comics (manga was sold under the CMX imprint from 2004 to 2010)
- Denpa
- Digital Manga Publishing
- Drawn & Quarterly
- Fakku (distributed by Denpa but separate ownership)
- Fantagraphics (Takumigraphics imprint)
- Floating World Comics
- Glacier Bay Books
- HarperCollins
- Image Comics
- IDW Publishing
- J-Novel Club
- Kaiten Books
- Kana Manga (https://kanamanga.com/)
- Kitty Media
- Kodama Tales
- Kodansha USA
- Last Gasp Publishing
- Living the Line (Smudge imprint)
- Mad Cave Studios (Nakama Press imprint)
- Madman Entertainment (Australian distributor for publishers that do not distribute directly in Australia)
- Manga Mavericks
- Marvel Comics
- NBM Publishing
- No Starch Press
- Penguin Random House (Inklore and Ink Pop imprints and formerly Del Rey manga imprint from 2004 to 2010 also distributes manga for other publishers)
- Saturday AM (magazine)
- Seven Seas Entertainment
- Stone Bridge Press
- Shonen jump
- Scholastic (Graphix imprint)
- SuBLime (BL imprint of Viz Media)
- Square Enix
- Retrofit Comics
- Titan Books
- Tokyopop
- Top Shelf Productions
- Udon Entertainment
- Vertical Inc (owned by Kodansha USA)
- VIZ Media
- Yaoi Press
- Yaoi Revolution
- Yen Press

=== Active (digital content only) ===
- Crunchyroll
- Comikey
- eigoMANGA
- Manga Box
- Manga Plus
- Omoi Manga
- Pocket Comics

=== Defunct ===
- ADV Manga
- ALC Publishing
- Aurora Publishing
- Bandai Entertainment
- Broccoli Books
- Central Park Media
- Chuang Yi
- ComicsOne
- comiXology
- Del Rey Manga
- Deux
- DramaQueen
- DrMaster
- Eros Comix
- Go! Comi
- Gutsoon! Entertainment
- Icarus Publishing
- ICEkunion
- Infinity Studios
- JManga
- Kitty Media
- MangaMagazine.net
- Media Blasters
- Netcomics
- PictureBox
- Sol Press
- Star Fruit Books
- Studio Ironcat
- The Right Stuf International

== Finnish ==
- Editorial Ivrea
- Punainen jättiläinen
- Sangatsu Manga

== French ==
- Ankama
- Akata/Delcourt
- Asuka
- Casterman
- Crunchyroll
- Delcourt
- Doki-Doki (Bamboo Édition)
- Glénat
- Kami
- Kana
- Kazé (became part of Crunchyroll in 2022)
- Ki-oon
- Panini Manga
- Pika Édition
- Samji
- Shogun City
- Soleil
- Taïfu Comics
- Tonkam

== German ==
- Altraverse
- Carlsen Manga
- Crunchyroll
- dani books
- Dokico
- Egmont Manga
- Manga Cult
- Manga JAM Session
- Panini Comics
- Tokyopop
- Yomeru

== Hungarian ==
- Mangafan

== Indonesian ==
- Acolyte Inc. (defunct)
- Elex Media Komputindo
- Erlangga
- Level Comics
- M&C Comics (formerly known as Majalah & Komik in 1980)

== Italian ==
- Coconino Press
- Dynit
- Panini Comics through the Planet Manga publishing division
- Star Comics (Italy)

=== Defunct ===
- Comic Art
- d/visual
- Planeta DeAgostini
- Shin Vision

== Japanese ==
- Akane Shinsha
- Akita Shoten
- Asahi Sonorama
- ASCII Media Works
- Bungeishunjū
- Bushiroad
- Chuokoron-Shinsha
- Coamix
- Core Magazine
- Earth Star Entertainment
- Enterbrain
- Flex Comix
- Fujimi Shobo
- Fusosha
- Futabasha
- Gakken
- Gentosha
- Hakusensha
- HERO'S INC.
- Houbunsha
- Ichijinsha
- Kadokawa Shoten
- Kasakura Publishing
- Kawade Shobō Shinsha
- Kill Time Communication
- Kobunsha
- Kodansha
- LEED Publishing
- Libre
- Mag Garden
- MediaWorks
- Media Factory
- Micro Magazine
- Nihon Bungeisha
- Ohta Publishing
- Ohzora Publishing
- Overlap, Inc.
- Papyless
- Sansai Books
- Shinchosha
- Shinshokan
- Shodensha
- Shogakukan
- Shōnen Gahōsha
- Shueisha
- Softgarage
- Square Enix
- Takeshobo
- Team Ninja
- Tokuma Shoten
- Tokyo Sogensha
- Twovirgins Publishing Group
- Wani Books
- Wanimagazine

== Malay ==
- Comics House (Defunct)
- Tora Aman (Defunct)
- Komik Remaja (Defunct)
- Arena (Defunct)
- Umbra (Defunct)
- PCM Comics (Defunct)
- Chuang Yi Malaysia (Defunct)
- Evergreen Publisher (Defunct)
- East Publications (Defunct)
- Kadokawa Gempak Starz

== Polish ==
- Egmont (1990-current (manga since 2002) - at the beginning they were publishing only Polish artists manga and now they publish regular manga on American license)
- Japonica Polonica Fantastica (JPF or J.P. Fantastica - 1996-current - the oldest manga publisher company in Poland. They focus on publishing classic titles like Sailor Moon, Naruto, Bleach etc.)
- Waneko (1999-current - the second biggest publisher)
- Hanami (2006-current - mostly they're translating Japanese cookbooks and guides and then manga)
- Studio JG (2007-current - the biggest publisher in Poland that owns the manga chain-shop Yatta.pl)
- Kotori (2012-current)
- Dango (2015-current - mostly yaoi and shonen-ai)
- Osiem macek (formed in 2015 and owned by Studio JG, specialises in hentai and etchi)
- Akuma (2019-current - specialises in hentai and etchi)
- Tenko (formed in 2024 and owned by Akuma, specialises in non-hentai manga)

=== Defunct ===
- TM-Semic (1990 - 2003)
- Mangaya (1999 - 2000)
- Mandragora (2001 - 2008)
- Kasen (2002 - 2008)
- Saisha (2003 - 2005)
- Arashi (2004 - 2004)
- Omikami (2011-2012)
- Yumegari (2012-2019, known as Hagari from 2017)
- Taiga (2013 - 2015)
- Wydawnictwo Komiksowe (2013 - 2019)
- Ringo Ame (2014-2016)
- Red Sun (2016-2017)
- Okami (2016-2018)

== Portuguese ==
=== Brazil ===
- Editora JBC
- Panini Comics
- Editora Abril
- Pipoca & Nanquim
- MPEG
- Mythos Editora
- NewPOP Editora
- Conrad Editora

=== Portugal ===
- Planeta DeAgostini
- Texto Editora

== Russian ==
- Alt Graph
- AST (publisher)
- Comics Factory
- Comix-ART
- Eksmo
- Sakura Press
- XL Media
- [(Истари Комикс)]

== Spanish ==
=== Argentina ===
- Editorial Ivrea

=== Mexico ===
- Distrito Manga
- Editorial Kamite
- Panini Manga

=== Spain ===
- DKO
- Editorial Ivrea
- Herder
- Norma Editorial
- Planeta DeAgostini
- Panini Manga

==== Defunct ====
- Glenat

== Swedish ==
- Bonnier Carlsen
- Egmont Kärnan

== Thai ==
- Bongkoch
- Nation Edutainment
- Rose Media and Entertainment

== Vietnamese ==
- Kim Dong Publishing House
- Tre Publishing House
- TVM Comics (defunct)

== See also ==
- List of comics publishing companies
- List of manga distributors
