= Manga outside Japan =

Manga, or comics, have appeared in translation in many different languages in different countries. France represents about 40% of the European comic market and in 2011, manga represented 40% of the comics being published in the country. In 2007, 70% of the comics sold in Germany were manga. In the United States, manga comprises a small (but growing) industry, especially when compared to the inroads that Japanese animation or Japanese video games have made in the USA. One example of a manga publisher in the United States, VIZ Media, functions as the American affiliate of the Japanese publishers Shogakukan and Shueisha. Though the United Kingdom has some manga publishers like Titan Manga and formerly Tanoshimi most manga sold in the United Kingdom are published by U.S. publishing companies like Viz Media and Kodansha Comics which are in turn owned by their Japanese counterparts. Alongside the United Kingdom, the U.S. manga publishers also sell their English translated manga in other English speaking nations like Canada, Australia and New Zealand with manga being quite popular in Australia compared to other English speaking countries.

== Flipping ==
Since written Japanese fiction usually flows from right to left, manga artists draw and publish this way in Japan. When first translating various titles into Western languages, publishers reversed the artwork and layouts in a process known as "flipping", so that readers could follow the books from left-to-right. However, various creators (such as Akira Toriyama) did not approve of the modification of their work in this way, and requested that foreign versions retain the right-to-left format of the originals. Soon, due both to fan demand and to the requests of creators, more publishers began offering the option of right-to-left formatting, which has now become commonplace in North America. Left-to-right formatting has gone from the rule to the exception.

Translated manga often includes notes on details of Japanese culture that foreign audiences may not find familiar.

One company, Tokyopop (founded 1997), produces manga in the United States with the right-to-left format as a highly publicised point-of-difference.

In April 2002, Tokyopop launched its "100% Authentic Manga" campaign, printing titles unflipped and with original Japanese sound effects untranslated, at a standardized price of $9.99 per volume. The campaign sold out its first print run within weeks and reached over 2,000 retailers nationwide. By the end of 2002, Tokyopop held 33 of the top 50 best-selling graphic novels in U.S. bookstores. The format also reduced production costs significantly, as skipping the flipping process allowed Tokyopop to release series at a rate three to six times faster than the industry standard at the time. The campaign's success accelerated the broader industry shift toward unflipped manga and contributed to a quadrupling of graphic novel sales in the U.S. between 2002 and 2007.

== Asia ==
=== Bangladesh ===
Few Bangladeshi Publishers, Editors and Comic Book Artists came up with an idea of native manga called Bangladeshi Manga which is solely created by Bangladeshi Publishers, Editors and Comic Book Artists, sometimes only by Bangladeshi Publications, distinctly inspired by the art form of Japanese Manga (Facial expression and Screenplay), story is mostly set in Bangladesh or fusion with Bengali culture and customs; published mostly in Bengali language and printing-reading method follows Bangladeshi publication standards (color, reading direction etc.).

The first Bangladeshi manga is Kinsa Khyong which was published by monthly juvenile magazine Kishor Alo in 2016, October edition. An artist duo named Shantona Shantuma created this manga. The idea of Bangladeshi manga was initiated by them and because of the concept of Bangladeshi manga and for creating the first published manga of Bangladesh, Shantona Shantuma is known as the first professional manga artist of Bangladesh.

In August 2018, Shantona Shantuma started a manga publication known as Manga Stage to promote and popularize Bangladeshi manga. Manga Stage is the first manga publication which is dedicated only to publish Bangladeshi Manga. Few manga artists of Bangladesh joined Manga Stage to publish their own works. Dewan Inzamam Adib (Made for Each Other), Michiko Rahman (14 days), Syed Irfan Ahmed (Game On) are among the prominent manga artists of Manga Stage.

While working on Bashap manga series (2018-2019), Shantona Shantuma started a new Bangladeshi manga series called Agnijoddha from Panjeree Publications Ltd. It is a commercial success as it has sold over a few thousand copies. Later, Panjeree Publications published a few other manga titles.

In December 2022, NRB Scholars Publishers Limited. published a left to right biography manga. It was unveiled in April 2023 with an enormous ceremony. The manga was authored by ME Chowdhury Shameem and Iwamoto Keita. The book won a Bronze award in 17th Japan International Manga Award, this prestigious manga award is arranged by the Ministry of Foreign Affairs, Japan every year.

In February 2023, a new manga publication named Fournetsha Bangladesh Limited launched a manga magazine named Source which received huge public appreciation. In the following year, the publication published a few book titles as well.

Aside from local publishers, some distributors like PBS, Batighar and Rokomari distributes Japanese Manga in Bangladesh.

=== China ===
China has censorship laws for manga. In 2015 The Chinese Ministry of Culture announced that it has blacklisted 38 Japanese anime and manga titles from distribution in China, including popular series like Death Note and Attack on Titan online or in print, citing "scenes of violence, pornography, terrorism and crimes against public morality."

A 2015 research report showed that out of 31 thousand surveyed users, 85% were manga enthusiasts.

=== India ===
Manga in India is published by VIZ Media.

=== Indonesia ===
Manga in Indonesia is published by Elex Media Komputindo, Acolyte, Level Comic, M&C and Gramedia. It has influenced Indonesia's original comic industry.

The wide distribution of scanlations contributes to the growth of bootleg manga. Seventh Heaven publishes bootleg versions of One Piece titles. Many popular titles, such as Bleach, Loki, Magister Nagi, Rose Hip Zero, and Kingdom Hearts, have been pirated.

=== Malaysia ===
Prior to 2016, there were two major homegrown authorised distributors for Malay language-translated manga which are Comics House, which operated from 1995 to 2016, and Tora Aman which operated from 1993 to 2017. As of date, only Kadokawa Gempak Starz survives following Japanese company Kadokawa's 80% share acquisition in local comic company Art Square Group in 2015, among which owns popular comic magazine Gempak.

=== Philippines ===
Manga in the Philippines were imported from the US and were sold only in specialty stores and in limited copies. The first manga in Filipino language was Doraemon which was published by J-Line Comics and was then followed by Case Closed.

A few local publishing companies like VIVA-PSICOM Publishing feature manga created by local artists whose stories are usually based from popular written books from the writing site Wattpad and are read from left to right instead of the usual right-to-left format for Japanese manga. The very first commercial local manga is She Died, an adaptation of the book written by Wattpad writer HaveYouSeenThisGirl. The art was done by Enjelicious.

In 2015, VIVA-PSICOM Publishing has announced that they will start publishing manga titles in the Filipino language with the line-up starting with Hiro Mashima's Fairy Tail and Isayama Hajime's Attack on Titan.

In 2015, Boys' Love manga became popular through the introduction of BL manga by printing company BLACKink. Among the first BL titles to be printed were Poster Boy, Tagila, and Sprinters, all were written in Filipino. BL manga have become bestsellers in the top three bookstore companies in the Philippines since their introduction in 2015.

=== Singapore ===
The company Chuang Yi publishes manga in English and Chinese in Singapore; some of Chuang Yi's English-language titles are also imported into Australia, New Zealand and the Philippines by Madman Entertainment. Singapore also has its own official Comics Society, led by manga artist Wee Tian Beng, illustrator of the Dream Walker series.

=== Thailand ===
In Thailand, before 1992, almost all available manga were fast, unlicensed, poor quality bootlegs. However, due to copyright laws, this has changed and copyrights protect nearly all published manga. Thailand's prominent manga publishers include Nation Edutainment, Siam Inter Comics, Vibulkij, and Bongkoch.

Many parents in Thai society are not supportive of manga. In October 2005, there was a television programme broadcast about the dark side of manga with exaggerated details, resulted in many manga being banned. The programme received many complaints and issued an apology to the audience.

In 2015, Boys' Love manga have become popular in mainstream Thai consumers, leading to television series adapted from BL manga stories since 2016.

== Europe ==
=== France ===
==== "French exception" ====
France has a particularly strong and diverse manga market. Many works published in France belong to genres not well represented outside Japan, such as too adult-oriented drama, or too experimental and avant-garde works. Early editors like Tonkam have published Hong-Kong authors (Andy Seto, Yu & Lau) or Korean authors (Kim Jae-hwan, Soo & Il, Wan & Weol and Hyun Se Lee) in their manga collection during 1995/1996 which is quite uncommon. Also, some Japanese authors, such as Jiro Taniguchi, are relatively unknown in other western countries but received much acclaim in France.

Since its introduction in the 1990s, manga publishing and anime broadcasting have become intertwined in France, where the most popular and exploited shōnen, shōjo and seinen TV series were imported in their paper version. Therefore, Japanese books ("manga") were naturally and readily accepted by a large juvenile public who was already familiar with the series and received the manga as part of their own culture. A strong parallel backup was the emergence of Japanese video games, Nintendo/Sega, which were mostly based on manga and anime series.

==== Nippon Animation era (1978–1986) ====
Possibly the first anime introduced into France: UFO Robot Grendizer (1978), an introduction to manga culture. The opening theme, by Saban, became an instant hit.

Producer Jean Chalopin contacted some Japanese studios, such as Toei (who did Grendizer); and Tokyo Movie Shinsha, Studio Pierrot and Studio Junio produced French-Japanese series. Even though made completely in Japan by character-designers such as Shingo Araki, the first Chalopin production of this type, Ulysses 31 took thematic inspiration from the Greek Odyssey and graphic influence from Stanley Kubrick's 2001: A Space Odyssey. Ulysses 31 went on sale in 1981, other shows produced by DiC Entertainment followed in 1982, Jayce and the Wheeled Warriors, Mysterious Cities of Gold, later M.A.S.K., etc. Such series were popular enough to allow the introduction of licensed products such as tee shirts, toys, stickers, mustard glass, mugs or keshi. Also followed a wave of anime adaptations of European tales by Studio Pierrot and mostly by the Nippon Animation studio, e.g. Johanna Spyri's Heidi, Girl of the Alps (1974), Waldemar Bonsels's Maya the Honey Bee (1975), Hector Malot's Nobody's Boy: Remi (1977), Cécile Aubry's Belle and Sebastian (1980), or Jules Verne's Around the World with Willy Fog (1983), notable adaptation of American works were Mark Twain's Adventures of Tom Sawyer (1980) and Alexander Key's Future Boy Conan. Interesting cases are Alexandre Dumas, père's The Three Musketeers adapted to Dogtanian and the Three Muskehounds (1981) and Sir Arthur Conan Doyle's Sherlock Holmes become Sherlock Hound (1984), both turned human characters into anthropomorph animals.

Such anthropomorphism in tales comes from old and common storytelling traditions in both Japanese and French cultures, including the Chōjū giga emaki (the true origins of manga) of Toba Sōjō (1053–1140), and the animal fables of Jean de La Fontaine (1621–1695). Changing humans to anthropomorphized dogs reflects a known form of Cynicism: etymologically speaking, the bite of the Cynic comes from the fact he is a dog (cyno means "dog" in Greek). The adaptations of these popular tales made easier the acceptance and assimilation of semi-Japanese cultural products in European countries such as Portugal and Spain. The localization including credits removal by Saban or DiC, was such that even today, twenty or thirty years later, most of French adults who have watched series like Calimero (1974) adapted from an Italian novel, Wanpaku Omukashi Kum Kum (1975), Barbapapa (1977) adapted from a French novel, or Monchichi (1980) as kids don't even know they were not local animation but "Japananimation" created in Japan.

==== Toei era (1987–1996) ====
In 1991, Akira, one of the first anime feature films released in France. "OST CD and manga now on sale".

In 1986 and 1987 three new private or privatized television channels appeared on French airwaves. An aggressive struggle for audience, especially on children television shows, started between the two public and the two private channels. After the private channels lost market share, they counter-attacked with a non-Japanese lineup, mostly American productions such as Hanna-Barbera. This ploy failed, and TF1 remained pre-eminent in children's TV shows with its Japanese licenses.

In 1991 French theaters showed an anime feature-film for the first time: Katsuhiro Otomo's Akira, a teen-rated, SF movie supported by manga publisher Glénat. TF1 Video edited the video (VHS) version for the French market, and Akira quickly became an anime reference. However, Japanese animation genre became massively exploited by TV shows from the late 1980s onwards, most notably the cult Club Dorothée show (mostly dedicated to Toei anime and tokusatsu series). In fact, the commercial relationship between the Japanese studio and the French show producers were so good, that the French presenter was even featured in a Super Sentai (Choujyu Sentai Liveman), Kamen Rider (Kamen Rider BLACK) and Metal Hero Series (Sekai Ninja Sen Jiraiya) episodes as guest star.

Just as in a Japanese manga series magazine, the Club Dorothée audience voted by phone or minitel to select and rank their favourite series. Top-ranked series continued the following week, others stopped. The most popular series were Dragon Ball and later its sequel, Dragon Ball Z, which became number one, and was nicknamed le chouchou ("the favorite") by the show presenter, Dorothée. As the series kept number one for several months, Dorothée invited Akira Toriyama (Toei Animation), creator of the series, on the TV show studio to introduce him to the French audience and award him a prize in the name of the TV show.

Saint Seiya was another anime series to achieve popularity in France. It showed more violence – directed towards an older audience – than the Nippon Animation studio shōnen/shōjo series of the 1970s and 1980s. Notable Toei and non-Toei anime series broadcast by that time on French TV included Captain Tsubasa, Robotech, High School! Kimengumi and Kinnikuman. This cult TV show ran from 1987 to 1997.

==== Generational conflict around manga (1990 to 1995) ====
Glénat published the first manga issued in France, Akira, in 1990 – supported by the respected newspaper Libération and by the national TV channel Antenne 2. Followers included Dragon Ball (1993), Appleseed (1994), Ranma ½ (1994) and five others. In the mid-1990s, manga magazines in B5 size like Kameha (Glénat) and Manga Player (MSE) were available.

At the same time a controversy arose among some parents. In particular, the conservative association Familles de France started a media polemic about the undesirable contents, such as violence, portrayed in the Club Dorothée, a kids' TV show. By this time, a generational conflict had arisen between the young fans of "Japanimation" (in use until anime became mainstream) and the older Japoniaiseries (a pejorative pun for Japonaiseries, literally "Japanese stuff" and "niaiseries", "simpleton stuff"). Ségolène Royal even published a book, Le Ras le bol des bébés zappeurs, in which manga are described as decadent, dangerous and violent. She hasn't changed her position on that topic yet. The same adult content controversy was applied to hentai manga, including the notorious, "forbidden", Shin Angel by U-Jin, published by pioneers such as Samourai Editions or Katsumi Editions and later to magazines. The first hentai series magazine, "Yoko", featured softcore series like Yuuki's Tropical Eyes. It was first issued in late 1995. The same year, the noir and ultra-violent series, Gunnm (aka Battle Angel Alita), was serialized in a slim, monthly edition. Around the same period a hardcore version of Yoko magazine Okaz was issued.

==== Anime clearance and manga emergence (1996 to 1998) ====
In 1996 the production group of Club Dorothée, broadcast on private channel TF1, set up a cable/satellite channel dedicated to manga and anime. The new channel changed its name to Mangas in 1998: the concepts of anime and manga have become intertwined in France, and manga actually became the mainstream generic term to designate the two media. The channel broadcasts former discontinued series from the Club Dorothée both to nostalgic adults and to new and younger generations.

==== Cultural integration and revival (1999 to present) ====
In late 1999 respected newspapers such as Le Monde gave critical acclaim to Hiroyuki Okiura's Jin-Roh, and in 2000, Hayao Miyazaki's Princess Mononoke became a commercial success.

In 2004, Mamoru Oshii's Innocence: Ghost in the Shell 2 became the first animation finalist in the prestigious International Film Festival of Cannes, which demonstrates a radical perspective change and a social acceptance of Japanese anime/manga. Since 2005, contemporary Japanese series such as Naruto, Initial D, Great Teacher Onizuka, Blue Gender or Gunslinger Girl appeared on new, analog/digital terrestrial (public) and on satellite/broadband (private) channels. As the highly aggressive competition who raged once between, the sole two or three available channels no more exists in the new, vast, and segmented French TV offer, the anime is doing a revival in France. In 2011, 40% of the comics published in France were manga. In 2013, there were 41 publishers of manga in France and, together with other Asian comics, manga represented around 40% of new comics releases in the country, surpassing Franco-Belgian comics for the first time. By mid-2021, 75 percent of the €300 value of Culture Pass accounts given to French 18 year-olds was spent on manga. In December 2021 France made the biggest ever manga launch in Europe by printing 250 000 copies of the 100th volume of One Piece within its first day of publishing.

==== Manga made in France ====
A surge in the growth of manga publishing circa 1996 coincided with the Club Dorothée show losing its audience – which eventually led to the show going off the air. Some early publishers like Glénat, adapted manga using the Western reading direction and its induced work of mirroring each panel and graphical signs, and also using a quality paper standard to the Franco-Belgian comics, while others, like J'ai Lu, were faithful to the original manga culture and not only kept the original, inverted, Japanese direction reading but also used a newspaper standard, cheap quality, paper just like in Japan. The Japanese manga was such an important cultural phenomenon that it quickly influenced French comics authors. A new "French manga" genre emerged, known as "La nouvelle manga" ("lit. the new manga") in reference to the French Nouvelle Vague.

=== Spain ===
Much like France, television had a large part in influencing the popularity of Japanese Manga, particularly with Dragon Ball and Saint Seiya showing up in the early nineties. Manga shook up the Spanish comics industry with new publishers taking in different directions with mostly publishing up manga instead of European comics.

=== Italy ===
The first manga title came in Italy, as a part of an anthology (I primi eroi - Antologia storica del fumetto mondiale), was Son-Goku by Shifumi Yamane, published in 1962. In late 1970s, because of great success, as in France, of the animated series imported from Japan, some publishers released many successful issues (such as Il grande Mazinga, Candy Candy and Lady Oscar) containing prettified versions of the original manga, sometimes with stories made by Spanish or Italian authors. In early 1980s, Eureka, a magazine edited by Alfredo Castelli and Silver, printed Black Jack by Osamu Tezuka and Golgo 13 by Takao Saitō.

The publishing of Akira took an interest in older readers picking up other manga in the same vein. Italy had a high acceptance of comics with violence and nudity which contributed to this development. The very first un-flipped version of a manga was Dragon Ball released for the very first time in a tankōbon format by Star Comics (Italy). Italy's major manga publishers are Panini Comics through the Planet Manga publishing division and Star Comics (Italy), followed by J-POP.

=== Germany ===
Unlike neighboring countries, Germany never had a vibrant local comic production. A volume of Barefoot Gen was licensed in Germany in the 1980s, as was Japan Inc., published by small presses. Akira's first volume was not very popular. Paul Malone attributes the wider distribution of manga in the late 1990s to the fledgling commercial television stations showing dubbed anime, which led to the popularity of manga. Malone also notes that the native German comics market collapsed at the end of the 1990s. Manga began outselling other comics in 2000.

With a few other series like Appleseed in the following years, the "manga movement" picked up speed with the publication of Dragon Ball, an un-flipped German manga, in late 1996. In 2007, manga accounted for approximately 70–75% of all comics published in Germany.

=== Portugal ===
In Portugal, manga has been published by Bertrand, Devir, Mangaline, Meribérica/Líber, Planeta DeAgostini and Texto Editora. The first manga published in Portugal were Ranma ½ and Spriggan, both in 1995, but neither were finished.

After several failed attempts at publishing manga throughout the early 2000's, in 2012 Devir gave it another try, starting with Death Note, and has continued publishing shonen manga ever since. The market has since then slowly expanded, with publishers picking up manga titles, as well as new manga-focused publishers being created.

=== Russia ===
Comics never gained high popularity in Russia, only few Marvel's titles being a moderate success. Russian readers traditionally considered them children's literature, so the manga market developed late. A strong movement of anime fans helped to spread manga. The general director of Egmont Russia Lev Yelin commented that the most popular manga series in Japan are comics which "contain sex and violence", so they probably won't be published in Russia. A representative of Sakura Press (the licensor and publisher of Ranma ½, Gunslinger Girl and some other titles) noted that although this niche is promising, it's hard to advance on the market, because "in Russia comics are considered children's literature". It is also impossible for publishers to predict the success or failure of any specific title. On the contrary, Rosmen's general director Mikhail Markotkin said the whole popularity of comics doesn't matter, as only artistic talent and good story make a successful project, and only such manga "will work" on the market.

The first officially licensed and published manga series in Russia was Ranma ½. Sakura Press released the first volume in 2005. Since then several legal companies appeared, including Comics Factory and Comix-ART. Comix-ART, which is working in collaboration with Eksmo, one of the largest publishing houses in Russia, was the first company to publish Original English-language manga (usually called "manga" or just "comics"), such as Bizenghast, Shutterbox and Van Von Hunter.

=== Poland ===
Manga has been published in Poland since the 1990s when the owner (a Japanese person) of one of the biggest publishers (J.P.F.) translated Ten no Hate Made - Poland Hishi into Polish to practice the language. Later, he decided to publish his work. The publisher is known from series like Sailor Moon, Dragon Ball, One Piece, Bleach and many others including Junji Ito horrors or well-known, old josei manga. Next to JPF, there are publishers such as Waneko or Studio JG known as the two other publishers making up the top three biggest in Poland. Waneko is well known for publishing the largest number of manga monthly and series like Great Teacher Onizuka, Kuroshitsuji, Pandora Hearts, and Bakuman. They are also very known for publishing less popular series like Bokura no Kiseki. Studio JG makes a lot of controversy by taking long breaks between manga volumes, leading many fans to express frustration at their attitude. They are known from series like Toradora, and Spice and Wolf. Behind that, there are publishers like Yumegari (though manhwa mainly), Kotori (known from Sword Art Light Novel and many yaoi manga), and Dango, which is the youngest of all Polish publishers. Dango is very much appreciated by fans due to good quality of volumes and the many extra free gadgets included. Yaoi manga sell well in Poland. Another publisher which deserves attention is Hanami, known for more mature manga like Monster and Pluto.

=== Lithuania ===
Manga has been published in Lithuania since the mid-2000s when the Lithuanian press company–Obuolys made a collaboration with Tokyopop by releasing the titles Vampire Hunter D, Hellsing, Dragon Ball, Naruto and Speed Racer translated into the Lithuanian language. A lot of manga is imported from the United States manga publishers and sold by various Lithuanian bookstores and retailers such as "Fujidream" - an online store founded in 2021 and solely dedicated to selling manga and light novels in the country.

=== United Kingdom ===
Manga in the United Kingdom is sold by various online retailers and book retail chains such as Waterstones.

In 2019 The British Museum held The Citi Exhibition: Manga, an exhibition dedicated to manga.

== North America ==
=== United States ===
The growth of manga translation and publishing in the United States has been a slow progression over several decades but became much faster later on.

One of the first manga to be distributed in English in the US with its original artwork intact was Keiji Nakazawa's major work Barefoot Gen in 1978, which was originally translated and printed under the auspices of Project Gen in Japan (by volunteers) to spread Nakazawa's message to the world, and then sent overseas and distributed in the U.S. by New Society Publishers. The second volume was translated by Frederik Schodt and Jared Cook. In December 1982 the San Francisco-based publisher Educomics released a colorized and translated version of Keiji Nakazawa's I Saw It. Four translated volumes of Barefoot Gen were initially distributed in the U.S. in the early 1980s, especially with the help of Alan Gleason, who served as the local coordinator for the Barefoot Gen project. Short works by several Garo-affiliated artists including Yoshiharu Tsuge and Terry Yumura appeared in May 1985 in RAW's no. 7 "Tokyo Raw" special.

In 1987, Viz Comics, an American subsidiary of the Japanese publishers Shogakukan and Shueisha, began publishing translations of three manga series – Area 88, Mai the Psychic Girl, and The Legend of Kamui – in the U.S. in association with the American publisher Eclipse Comics. Viz went on to bring English translations of popular series such as Ranma ½ and Nausicaä of the Valley of the Wind in the late 1980s and early 1990s. Some other American publishers released notable translations of Japanese comics in this period, such as First Comics' serialization of Lone Wolf and Cub which started in May 1987. However, the first manga to make a strong impression on American audiences was Katsuhiro Otomo's Akira, which was brought to the United States in colorized form in 1988 by Epic Comics, a division of Marvel.

Throughout the 1990s, manga slowly gained popularity as Viz Media, Dark Horse and Mixx (now Tokyopop) released more titles for the US market. Both Mixx and Viz published manga anthologies: MixxZine (1997–1999) ran serialized manga such as Sailor Moon, Magic Knight Rayearth and Ice Blade, while Viz's Animerica Extra (1998–2004) featured series including Fushigi Yugi, Banana Fish and Utena: Revolutionary Girl. In 2002 Viz began publishing a monthly American edition of the famous Japanese "phone book"-style manga anthology Shōnen Jump featuring some of the most popular manga titles from Japan, including Dragon Ball Z, Naruto, Bleach and One Piece. Its circulation far surpassed that of previous American manga anthologies, reaching 180,000 in 2005. Also in 2005, Viz launched Shojo Beat, a successful counterpart to Shonen Jump aimed at female readers.

In 2002, Tokyopop introduced its "100% Authentic Manga" line, which featured unflipped pages and were smaller in size than most other translated graphic novels. This allowed them be retailed at a price lower than that of comparable publications by Viz and others. The line was also made widely available in mainstream bookstores such as Borders and Barnes & Noble, which greatly increased manga's visibility among the book-buying public. After Tokyopop's success, most of the other manga companies switched to the smaller unflipped format and offered their titles at similar prices.

In the following years, manga became increasingly popular, and new publishers entered the field while the established publishers greatly expanded their catalogues. The Pokémon manga Electric Tale of Pikachu issue #1 sold over 1 million copies in the United States, making it the best-selling single comic book in the United States since 1993. By 2008, the U.S. and Canadian manga market generated $175 million in annual sales. Simultaneously, mainstream U.S. media began to discuss manga, with articles in The New York Times, Time magazine, The Wall Street Journal, and Wired magazine.

A large number of small companies in the United States publish manga. Several large publishers have also released, or expressed interest in releasing manga. Del Rey translated and published several Japanese series including xxxHolic, Tsubasa: Reservoir Chronicle and, Negima!: Magister Negi Magi, while Harlequin has brought its Ginger Blossom line of manga, originally released only in Japan, to the United States as well.

As of January 2020 manga is the second largest category in the US comic book and graphic novel market, accounting for 27% of the entire market share.

As of 2022, each of the largest manga publishers own a North American subsidiary that license their parent company's manga:

- Kodansha: Vertical imprint of Kodansha USA
- Hitotsubashi Group (Shogakukan, Shueisha et al): Viz Media
- Kadokawa Future Publishing: Yen Press (joint venture with Hachette Book Group)

== Oceania ==
In Australia and New Zealand, many popular Japanese and Korean-language manga and anime are distributed by Madman Entertainment.

== South America ==
=== Brazil ===
Before the 1990s some trial marketing of manga took place in Brazil, including Lone Wolf and Cub, the first one published in the country in 1988, Mai, the Psychic Girl, Akira, Cobra, Crying Freeman, and The Legend of Kamui. The Brazilian shōnen market started in the mid-1990s with Ranma ½ published by Animangá, although the publication did not prove successful (due to the fact that it was released in the American format and contained only two chapters per issue, roughly equivalent to one fourth of a tankohon). It was followed by Pokémon: The Electric Tale of Pikachu, released by Conrad in 1999, during the Pokémon boom.

In 2000, Conrad published Saint Seiya and Dragon Ball (both titles already well known, since the equivalent anime had been highly successful in the 1990s). After the success of these titles, Conrad released not only trendy manga like One Piece, Vagabond, Neon Genesis Evangelion, and Slam Dunk, but also classic manga like Osamu Tezuka titles (including Adolf and Buddha), Nausicaä, and less known titles like Bambi and Her Pink Gun and Sade.

In 2001, the Japanese-Brazilian company Japan Brazil Communication (JBC) started publishing manga, releasing Rurouni Kenshin, Magic Knight Rayearth, Cardcaptor Sakura and Video Girl Ai. In 2009, JBC published Clamp titles like X/1999, Tsubasa Reservoir Chronicle and xxxHolic, and popular titles like Inuyasha, Negima!, Fruits Basket, Death Note, Fullmetal Alchemist, Yu-Gi-Oh!, Shaman King, Love Hina and Bakuman, having also picked up the publishing rights for Ranma ½ and Neon Genesis Evangelion in the same year.

In 2004, Panini started publishing manga, with the release of Peach Girl and Eden. In 2012, Panini published the most popular manga in Brazil: Naruto and Bleach, as well as titles like Black Lagoon, Highschool of the Dead, Full Metal Panic! and Welcome to the N.H.K.. Panini has also, in 2012, acquired the publishing rights to One Piece in Brazil, continuing publication from where Conrad had stopped (Japanese volume 37) as well as reprinting earlier volumes in the original Japanese format.

Originally, Brazilian manga appeared with about half the size of a tankoubon (about 100 pages of stories and two to eight pages of extras), but almost all of the manga is released in the original format.

After years of negotiation, JBC finally released Sailor Moon in early 2014. The edition, regarded as the most important release ever done by the company, was reportedly praised by creator Naoko Takeuchi and Kodansha employees, thanks to its good quality.

Between 2023 and 2024, manga sales in Brazil were listed among the best-selling comics in the country, with One Piece being the second best-selling title, behind only the solo comic of the character Monica.

== Other distribution methods ==
Another popular form of manga distribution outside Japan involves Internet scanlations (or scanslations). Typically, a small group of people scan the original version of a series with no current license in the language which they wish to translate it to, translate it, and freely distribute it; usually through the use of IRC or BitTorrent.

== Manga influences ==
The earliest manga-derived series to be released in the United States was a redrawn American adaptation of Osamu Tezuka's Astro Boy published by Gold Key Comics starting in 1965.

In 1979, Gold Key published the comic book Battle of Planets, based on a television series of the same name. Marvel published a series based Shogun Warriors, bringing characters of the mecha anime and manga series: Brave Raideen, Chodenji Robo Combattler V and Wakusei Robo Danguard Ace.

In other Asian countries, Manga influenced Korean Manhwa and Chinese Manhua.

Manga has proved so popular that it has led to other companies such as Antarctic Press, Oni Press, Seven Seas Entertainment and Tokyopop, as well as long-established publishers like Marvel and Archie Comics, to release their own manga-inspired works that apply the same artistic stylings and story pacing commonly seen in Japanese manga. One of the first of these such works came in 1985 when Ben Dunn, founder of Antarctic Press, released Mangazine and Ninja High School (debuting in 1987) and Eternity Comics released Jason Waltrip's Metal Bikini (debuting in 1990), as well as adaptations of anime like Captain Harlock, Robotech and Lensman. Later, NOW Comics published its own adaptations of Astro Boy (1987–1989) and Speed Racer (1987–1990), the latter of which included Speed Racer Classics (1988–1989), an English-language adaptation of Tatsuo Yoshida's original manga Mach Go Go Go.

While Antarctic Press actively refers to its works as "American Manga", it does not source all of these manga-inspired works from the United States. Many of the artists working on Seven Seas Entertainment series such as Last Hope (manga) and Amazing Agent Luna are Filipino and TOKYOPOP has hired a variety of Korean and Japanese artists to work on titles such as Warcraft and Princess Ai. Many of these works have been classified on the Internet with titles such as OEL Manga, MIC, and World Manga, although none of these terms have actually been used by manga companies to describe these works on the books themselves.

In Brazil, the popularity of manga is marked also by the large number of Japanese and descendants in the country. As early as 1956, Ypê Nakashima, a Japanese immigrant, published in the yonkoma format a comic strip titled Sr. Bra da Colônia in the São Paulo Shimbun, a newspaper restricted to the Japanese colony. Nakashima would later become better known for his work in animation, particularly the animated feature Piconzé (1972). In the 1960s, some of Japanese descent, such as Minami Keizi and Claudio Seto, started using graphic influences, narratives or manga themes in their work in EDREL publisher founded by Keizi.

In Germany, as manga began outselling domestic comics in 2000, German publishers began supporting German creators of manga-styled comics. Jürgen Seebeck's Bloody Circus was not popular amongst German manga readers due to its European style, and other early German manga artists were affected by cancellations. After this, German publishers began focussing on female creators, due to the popularity of shōjo manga, leading to what Paul Malone describes as a "home-grown shōjo boom", and "more female German comics artists in print than ever before". However, genuinely manga-influenced stylistic conventions, such as sweatdrops, are employed to ensure "authenticity", original German works are flipped to read in a right-to-left style familiar to manga readers, author's afterwords and sidebars are common, and many German manga take place in Asia.

The Arabic language manga "Canary 1001" is by a group calling themselves Amateam, whose director is Wahid Jodar, from the United Arab Emirates. Another Arab language manga is Gold Ring, by Qais Sedeki, from 2009, also from the United Arab Emirates. Both groups of artists use the word "manga" for their work.

In May 2010, Glenat Spain introduced their new line of works known as Linea Gaijin which showcases the works of several Spanish and Latin American comic book artists. This is an effort on the part of Glenat to bring fresh new content and breed a new generation of manga-inspired artists that grew up reading manga. The line began with titles such as Bakemono, Dos Espadas, and Lettera that were shown on the Salón del Manga de Barcelona in October 2010, but it would later introduce other works as well.

== See also ==
- Editing of anime in distribution
- Manhwa
- Original English-language manga
