= List of manga distributors =

This article lists distributors of manga in various markets worldwide.

== Chinese ==
=== Traditional Chinese ===
- Daran Comics (defunct) (Taiwan)
- Kadokawa Comics Taiwan (Taiwan)
- Tong Li Comics (Taiwan)
- Ever Glory Publishing (Taiwan)
- Sharp Point Publishing (Taiwan)
- King Comics Hong Kong (Hong Kong)
- Culturecom Comics (Hong Kong)
- Jade Dynasty (Hong Kong)
- Jonesky (Hong Kong)
- Kwong's Creations Co Ltd
- Rightman Publishing Ltd

=== Simplified Chinese ===
- ChuangYi Publishing (Singapore)
- WitiComics (Hong Kong)

== Czech ==
- CREW

== Dutch ==
- Glenat
- Kana
- Xtra

== English ==
- ADV Manga (defunct)
- Aurora Publishing (defunct)
- Blast Books
- Broccoli Books (defunct)
- Chuang Yi (defunct)
- CMX (defunct)
- ComicsOne (defunct)
- CPM Manga (defunct)
- Cross Infinite World
- Dark Horse Comics
- Del Rey Manga (defunct)
- Denpa
- DH Publishing
- Digital Manga
- DramaQueen
- Drawn & Quarterly
- DrMaster
- eigoMANGA
- Go! Comi
- J-Novel Club
- Kaiten Books
- Kodansha Comics
- Madman Entertainment
- Netcomics
- One Peace Books
- Ponent Mon/Fanfare
- Seven Seas Entertainment
- Sol Press (defunct)
- Square Enix Manga & Books
- Studio Ironcat (defunct)
- Titan Publishing Group
- Tokyopop (formerly Mixx)
- Udon Entertainment
- Vertical
- Viz Media (formerly Viz, LLC)
- Yen Press

== Finnish ==
- Sangatsu Manga
- Egmont Finland
- Punainen jättiläinen
- Pauna Media Group
- Editorial Ivrea

== French ==
- Ankama Editions
- Akata/Delcourt
- Asuka
- Atomic Club (defunct)
- Casterman
- Doki Doki
- Dybex (retired from the manga market in 2006) (Belgium)
- Gekko
- Panini Manga (part of Panini Comics)
- Glénat
- J'ai lu (retired from the manga market in 2006)
- Kami
- Kana
- Kaze
- Kabuto
- Ki-oon
- Kurokawa
- Pika Édition
- SeeBD (defunct)
- Shogun City
- Tonkam
- Végétal Manga Shoten became Vegetal Shuppan in 2006

== German ==
- Carlsen Verlag
- Delfinium Prints
- Egmont Manga & Anime (EMA)
- Planet Manga
- Tokyopop Germany
- Heyne Manga
- Butter & Cream
- Schwarzer Turm
- Kazé Manga

== Hungarian ==
- Mangafan
- Mangattack
- Fumax

== Indonesian ==
- Elex Media Komputindo
  - Level Comics (imprint of Elex Media Komputindo)
- M&C Comics (formerly known as Majalah & Komik in 1980)
- Tiga Lancar Comic
- Rajawali Comic (defunct)

== Italian ==
- BAO Publishing
- Canicola Edizioni
- Coconino Press
- d/books (part of d/visual, defunct)
- DisneyManga
- Dynit
- Flashbook
- Free Books
- GP Manga (formerly GP Publishing, acquired by Edizioni BD and merged with J-Pop)
- Granata Press (defunct)
- Goen (part of RW Edizioni)
- J-Pop (part of Edizioni BD)
- Hazard Edizioni
- Hikari Edizioni (part of 001 Edizioni)
- Kappa Edizioni
- Magic Press
- PlayPress (now Play Media Company, retired from the manga market in 2008)
- Planet Manga (part of Panini Comics)
- Planeta DeAgostini (retired from the manga market in 2009)
- Oblomov Edizioni
- Rizzoli Lizard
- Ronin Manga
- Star Comics
- Yamato Edizioni (part of Yamato Video)

== Japanese ==
- Akita Publishing Co., Ltd.
- Bungeishunjū
- Chuokoron Shinsha
- Enterbrain
- Fujimi Shobo
- Fusosha
- Futabasha
- Gakken
- Gentosha
- Hakusensha
- Hayakawa Publishing
- Ichijinsha
- Kadokawa Shoten
- Kobunsha
- Kodansha
- Mag Garden
- MediaWorks
- MediBang Inc.
- Shinchosha
- Shinshokan
- Shodensha
- Shogakukan
- Shonen Gahosha
- Shueisha
- Square Enix
- Tokuma Shoten
- Tokodo
- Ushio Shuppan
- Wani Books

== Malay ==
- Art Square Group
- Comics House (Closed)
- Tora Aman (Closed)
- Superior Comics
- Komik Remaja
- Arena
- Umbara
- PCM comics
- Manga Boom

== Polish ==
- Egmont
- Japonica Polonica Fantastica
- Waneko
- Hanami
- Studio JG
- Osiem Macek
- Kotori
- Dango
- Akuma
- Tenko
- TM-Semic (defunct)
- Mangaya (defunct)
- Mandragora (defunct)
- Kasen (defunct)
- Saisha (defunct)
- Arashi (defunct)
- Omikami (defunct)
- Yumegari (defunct)
- Taiga (defunct)
- Wydawnictwo Komiksowe (defunct)
- Ringo Ame (defunct)
- Red Sun (defunct)
- Okami (defunct)

== Portuguese ==
=== European Portuguese ===
- Editora Devir
- Sendai Editora
- Midori Editora

=== Brazilian Portuguese ===
- JBC
- Planet Manga
- NewPOP Editora

== Russian ==
- Comix ART (part of Eksmo)

== Spanish ==
- Editorial Vid México
- Editorial Toukan (Mexico)
- Glénat
- Ivréa
- Norma Editorial
- Planeta DeAgostini
- Ediciones Mangaline

== Swedish ==
- Bonnier Carlsen
- Egmont Kärnan
- Ordbilder Media

== Thai ==
- Phoenix Next(Kadokawa Amarin)
- Vibulkij Comics
- Nida Publishing
- Nation Edutainment
- Comics Publications Co., Ltd.
- Bongkoch
- Siam Inter Comics
- luckpim publishing
- First Page Pro
- ANIMAG Comics
- Dexpress
- Zenshu Comics (Rose Media and Entertainment)

== Vietnamese ==
- Tre Publishing House
- Kim Đồng Publishing House
- TVM Comics (Closed)
- TA Books
- Innovative Publishing and Media (IPM)
