= Crunchyroll EMEA =

European entertainment company

- Formerly: Viz Media Europe (2007–2020)
- Type: Division
- Industry: Publication
- Founded: January 15, 2007; 19 years ago
- Headquarters: Crunchyroll SAS: Paris, France; Crunchyroll SA: Lausanne, Switzerland; Crunchyroll GmbH: Berlin, Germany
- Area served: Europe; Middle East; North Africa; South Africa
- Key people: John Easum (Head of Crunchyroll EMEA)
- Revenue: 12,212,446 (2020)
- Net income: 4,997,942 (2020)
- Parent: Viz Media (2007–2019); Crunchyroll, LLC (Note: Through a joint venture between Sony Pictures and Aniplex.) (2019–present)
- Divisions: Crunchyroll SAS; Crunchyroll SA; Crunchyroll GmbH

Crunchyroll EMEA, formerly known as Viz Media Europe, is a European anime distributor. Established as Viz Media Europe, it was Viz Media's European sister company until 2019. It holds partnerships with TV channels, DVD distributors, and manga publishers. The company was once headquartered in Amsterdam, before the company opened its current Paris operations on January 15, 2007. The division is made up of three subsidiaries, Crunchyroll SAS based in Paris, France, Crunchyroll SA based in Lausanne, Switzerland, and Crunchyroll GmbH based in Berlin, Germany. Crunchyroll EMEA is run by Sony through Crunchyroll, LLC, a joint venture between Sony Pictures and Aniplex, with Shogakukan, Shueisha and Shogakukan-Shueisha Productions (ShoPro) retaining full ownership of the former Viz Media Europe's Publishing/Licensing Business for manga publishing in the region.

On January 27, 2020, Viz Media Europe changed its corporate name to Crunchyroll EMEA, announcing the change publicly on April 2, 2020, with all of Viz Media's former brands being rebranded under the Crunchyroll branding.

On July 16, 2025, HarperCollins announced that it has acquired the French and German Crunchyroll manga publishing business, with the acquisition being closed on September 30, 2025.

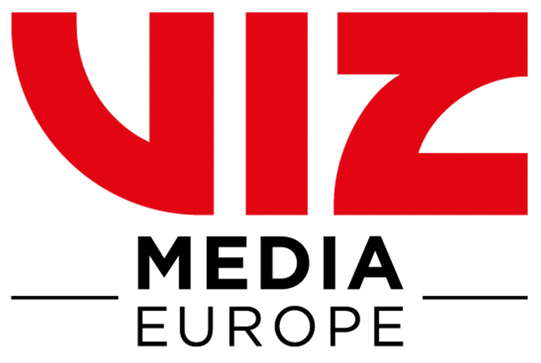
The logo of Viz Media Europe, used from 2017 until its rebranding in April 2020

== Subsidiaries and brands ==
As of April 2020, Crunchyroll EMEA has been organised into a portfolio of brands and companies. Crunchyroll EMEA is also affiliated with VME PLB SAS, though does not own any stake of the company. Additionally, despite Crunchyroll Moldova (formerly known as Ellation) being located in Europe, it is not incorporated or operated under Crunchyroll EMEA.

=== Current ===
==== Crunchyroll SAS ====
Crunchyroll SAS, formerly known as Viz Media Europe, is the French subsidiary of Crunchyroll, housing the French-language operations of the company, including Kazé France and Anime Digital Network.

==== Crunchyroll SA ====
Crunchyroll SA, formerly known as Viz Media Switzerland, is the Swiss subsidiary of Crunchyroll, housing the German-language operations of the company, including Kazé Germany, Eye See Movies, Crunchyroll GmbH and the defunct Anime on Demand.

==== Crunchyroll GmbH ====
Crunchyroll GmbH, formerly known as AV Visionen GmbH, is the German subsidiary of Crunchyroll SA, and is responsible for distributing anime, manga and films in German-speaking territories under the Kazé and Crunchyroll labels as well as German television and films in Germany though its Eye See Movies label. It is also the distributor for Anime House, Nipponart, Hardball Films, Film Confect Anime, and Polyband Anime as well as for Aniplex's Peppermint Anime, and manga of the independent labels MangaCult and Manga Jam Session.

=== Former ===
==== Anime Digital Network ====
Anime Digital Network is a French video on demand service dedicated to streaming anime content to French-speaking territories. The business was a partnership between Crunchyroll EMEA (though Kazé) and Média-Participations subsidiary Citel. Crunchyroll relinquished its ownership of Anime Digital Network on July 27, 2022, with Média-Participations becoming the full owner of the business.

==== Anime on Demand ====
Anime on Demand was a German video on demand service dedicated to streaming anime content to German-speaking territories. It shut down on December 8, 2021, with all content being merged into Crunchyroll.

==== Kazé ====
Kazé was a French division of Crunchyroll EMEA, and is responsible for the distribution of anime and manga within France and other French-speaking regions. Kazé also operated in German territories through Crunchyroll SA and Crunchyroll GmbH as well in the British market in collaboration with Manga Entertainment UK, now known as Crunchyroll UK and Ireland. On June 1, 2022, Crunchyroll announced that Kazé would be rebranded as Crunchyroll. The rebranding became effective on October 1, 2022. HarperCollins would later relaunch the company in April 2026 after it acquired Crunchyroll's French and German manga publishing service, with Kazé included.

=== Related ===
==== VME PLB SAS ====
VME PLB SAS is a publishing licensing business owned by Shogakukan, Shueisha and Shogakukan-Shueisha Productions (ShoPro). The company was formed in December 2019, after Crunchyroll acquired the majority stake in Viz Media Europe. The company is responsible for licensing manga within the EMEA and Latin American regions. Kazuyoshi Takeuchi is President of VME PLB and Kazuyuki Masuda is Managing Director of VME PLB.

== See also ==
- Wakanim
- Beez Entertainment
- Dynit
- MC Entertainment
- Mega-Anime
- Reanimedia
