= Kami (publisher) =

French comic book publisher

Kami is a French comics publisher. It publishes manga, manhwa and manfra. It cancelled the publication of most of its titles in 2010.

== Titles ==
- Aflame Inferno
- Aqua (アｸア)
- Aria (アリア)
- Beast of East
- Birth
- Chroniques de Lodoss
- DearS (ディアーズ)
- Desert Coral (デザート・コーラル)
- Edison Fantasy Science
- Erementar Gerad (エレメンタル ジェレイド)
- G-Plus
- Gate Keepers (ゲートキーパーズ)
- Innocent W.
- Junkyard Magnetic
- Ka-Kong
- Le Loup de Hinata
- Loki
- Mille et Une Nuits (천일야화)
- Nambul (남벌)
- Napoleon (ナポレオン)
- L'Officiel du Manga 2007
- Opéra de Pékin
- Peacemaker Kurogane (Peace Maker 鐵)
- Peace Maker (Kurogane prequel)
- Princess Princess (プリンセス・プリンセス)
- Rai
- Robot (ArtBook)
- Slasher
- Sorcière de l'ouest (西の善き魔女)
- Vassalord
- XS
- xxxHolic Official FanBook (×××ホリック Official Fanbook)

== See also ==
- List of manga publishers
