= Dream Walker =

Dream Walker may refer to:

- Dream Walker (comic), a Singaporean comic book series
- Kulipari: Dream Walker, the second season of the animated television series Kalipari
- The Dream Walker, a 2014 album by Angels & Airwaves

== See also ==
- Dreamwalker (disambiguation)
