= List of Chihayafuru chapters =

The cover of the first volume of the Chihayafuru manga series released by Kodansha on 13 May 2008

Chihayafuru is a Japanese manga series written and illustrated by Yuki Suetsugu. The series has been serialized in Kodansha's Be Love magazine from 28 December 2007 to 1 August 2022. It is about a school girl, Chihaya Ayase, who is inspired by a new classmate to take up Hyakunin Isshu karuta competitively. The chapters were collected into 50 tankōbon volumes. Kodansha also published the first three volumes in a two-volume bilingual edition, with English translations by Stuart Varnam Atkin and Yōko Toyozaki.

On 14 February 2017, Kodansha Comics began publishing a digital edition of the series in English, with the last volume released on 3 June 2025. The manga is licensed in French by Pika Édition, in Korean by Haksan Culture Company, in traditional Chinese by Tong Li Publishing, and in Thai by Bongkoch Publishing.

The chapters in the series are called "verses".

== Volumes ==
=== Chihayafuru ===
No.	Original release date	Original ISBN	English release date	English ISBN
1	13 May 2008	978-4-06-319239-1	14 February 2017	978-1-68-233567-3
Verses 1–5
2	12 September 2008	978-4-06-319245-2	16 May 2017	978-1-68-233672-4
Verses 6–11
3	12 December 2008	978-4-06-319252-0	13 June 2017	978-1-68-233702-8
Verses 12–17
4	13 March 2009	978-4-06-319259-9	22 August 2017	978-1-68-233799-8
Verses 18–23
5	12 June 2009	978-4-06-319266-7	10 October 2017	978-1-68-233939-8
Verses 24–29
6	11 September 2009	978-4-06-319271-1	14 November 2017	978-1-68-233960-2
Verses 30–35
7	11 December 2009	978-4-06-319276-6	12 December 2017	978-1-68-233996-1
Verses 36–41
8	12 March 2010	978-4-06-319282-7	16 January 2018	978-1-64-212072-1
Verses 42–47
9	11 June 2010	978-4-06-319287-2	20 February 2018	978-1-64-212127-8
Verses 48–53
10	13 September 2010	978-4-06-319294-0	3 April 2018	978-1-64-212182-7
Verses 54–58
11	13 December 2010	978-4-06-380301-3	15 May 2018	978-1-64-212230-5
Verses 59–63
12	11 March 2011	978-4-06-380309-9	6 November 2018	978-1-64-212559-7
Verses 64–68
13	13 June 2011	978-4-06-380320-4	18 December 2018	978-1-64-212600-6
Verses 69–73
14	13 September 2011	978-4-06-380324-2	1 January 2019	978-1-68-233567-3
Verses 74–78
15	13 December 2011	978-4-06-380331-0	5 March 2019	978-1-64-212699-0
Verses 79–83
16	13 March 2012	978-4-06-380339-6	2 April 2019	978-1-64-212820-8
Verses 84–88
17	13 June 2012	978-4-06-380349-5	4 June 2019	978-1-64-212881-9
Verses 89–93
18	13 September 2012	978-4-06-380359-4	7 January 2020	978-1-64-659198-5
Verses 94–98
19	13 December 2012	978-4-06-380369-3	7 April 2020	978-1-64-659283-8
Verses 99–103
20	13 March 2013	978-4-06-380379-2	2 June 2020	978-1-64-659381-1
Verses 104–108
21	13 June 2013	978-4-06-380389-1	4 August 2020	978-1-64-659618-8
Verses 109–113; Chihayafuru Cup 2013 East Japan Tournament Exciting Report Manga
22	13 September 2013	978-4-06-380397-6 (RE); 978-4-06-358459-2 (LE)	6 October 2020	978-1-64-659744-4
Verses 114–118
23	13 December 2013	978-4-06-380410-2	1 December 2020	978-1-64-659852-6
Verses 119–123
24	11 April 2014	978-4-06-380422-5	2 February 2021	978-1-64-659943-1
Verses 124–128
25	11 July 2014	978-4-06-380433-1	6 April 2021	978-1-63-699036-1
Verses 129–133
26	10 October 2014	978-4-06-380442-3	1 June 2021	978-1-63-699138-2
Verses 134–138
27	13 April 2015	978-4-06-380465-2	3 August 2021	978-1-63-699284-6
Verses 139–143
28	12 August 2015	978-4-06-380474-4	5 October 2021	978-1-63-699396-6
Verses 144–148
29	13 October 2015	978-4-06-380484-3	7 December 2021	978-1-63-699505-2
Verses 149–153
30	13 January 2016	978-4-06-380491-1	1 February 2022	978-1-63-699544-1
Verses 154–158
31	11 March 2016	978-4-06-380498-0	5 April 2022	978-1-68-491113-4
Verses 159–163
32	13 July 2016	978-4-06-394513-3	7 June 2022	978-1-68-491202-5
Verses 164–168
33	13 October 2016	978-4-06-394522-5	2 August 2022	978-1-68-491376-3
Verses 169–173
34	13 March 2017	978-4-06-394535-5	4 October 2022	978-1-68-491467-8
Verses 174–178
35	10 August 2017	978-4-06-394550-8	6 December 2022	978-1-68-491574-3
Verses 179–183
36	13 November 2017	978-4-06-510484-2 (RE); 978-4-06-510715-7 (SE)	7 February 2023	978-1-68-491686-3
Verses 184–188
37	13 February 2018	978-4-06-511004-1	4 April 2023	978-1-68-491878-2
Verses 189–193
38	11 May 2018	978-4-06-511697-5	6 June 2023	978-1-68-491959-8
Verses 194–198
39	9 August 2018	978-4-06-512495-6 (RE); 978-4-06-512666-0 (SE)	1 August 2023	979-8-88-933087-5
Verses 199–203
40	13 November 2018	978-4-06-513925-7 (RE); 978-4-06-514136-6 (SE)	3 October 2023	979-8-88-933175-9
Verses 204–208
41	13 March 2019	978-4-06-515049-8	5 December 2023	979-8-88-933282-4
Verses 209–213
42	12 July 2019	978-4-06-516668-0	6 February 2024	979-8-88-933367-8
Verses 214–217
43	13 December 2019	978-4-06-518035-8 (RE); 978-4-06-517933-8 (SE)	2 April 2024	979-8-88-933429-3
Verses 218–221
44	13 May 2020	978-4-06-519522-2	4 June 2024	979-8-88-933560-3
Verses 222–225
45	13 October 2020	978-4-06-521140-3	6 August 2024	979-8-88-933688-4
Verses 226–229
46	12 March 2021	978-4-06-522560-8 (RE); 978-4-06-522851-7 (LE)	1 October 2024	979-8-89-478097-9
Verses 230–233
47	12 August 2021	978-4-06-524543-9	3 December 2024	979-8-89-478298-0
Verses 234–237
48	10 February 2022	978-4-06-526797-4	4 February 2025	979-8-89-478362-8
Verses 238–241; Intro to Competitive Karuta: 40-Card Karuta
49	13 July 2022	978-4-06-528488-9	1 April 2025	979-8-89-478482-3
Verses 242–245
50	13 December 2022	978-4-06-530206-4 (RE); 978-4-06-530738-0 (SE)	3 June 2025	979-8-89-478483-0
Verse 246; Final Verse; Side Storyuta: Hana no Iro wa

=== Chihayafuru: Chūgakusei-hen ===
No.	Release date	ISBN
1	13 February 2018	978-4-06-511024-9
Chapters 1–6
2	9 August 2018	978-4-06-511024-9
Chapters 7–12
3	13 November 2018	978-4-06-514041-3
Chapters 13–18

=== Chihayafuru plus Kimi ga Tame ===
No.	Release date	ISBN
1	12 April 2024	978-4-06-535322-6
Chapters 1–3
2	12 August 2024	978-4-06-536624-0
Chapters 4–6
3	13 December 2024	978-4-06-537806-9
Chapters 7–9
4	13 June 2025	978-4-06-539784-8
Chapters 10–13
5	13 November 2025	978-4-06-541487-3
Chapters 14-17
6	13 April 2026	978-4-06-543230-3
Chapters 18-21
7	11 September 2026	978-4-06-544890-8
Chapters 22-25
