= Arabian Nights (disambiguation) =

Arabian Nights, or One Thousand and One Nights, is a Middle-Eastern folk tale collection.

Arabian Nights may also refer to:

== Films and television ==
- Arabian Nights (1942 film), a Technicolor film starring Jon Hall and Maria Montez
- Arabian Nights (1946 film), an Indian fantasy-adventure adaptation by Niren Lahiri
- Arabian Nights (1974 film), English title of Il fiore delle mille e una notte, an Italian film
- Arabian Nights (2015 film), a Portuguese film
- Arabian Nights (miniseries), a 2000 television adaptation of The Book of One Thousand and One Nights

== Games ==
- Arabian Nights (1993 video game), for the Commodore Amiga
- Arabian Nights (Magic: The Gathering), a 1993 expansion to the collectible card game
- Arabian Nights: Sabaku no Seirei-ō, a 1996 Japan-exclusive Super Famicom video game
- Arabian Nights (2001 video game)

== Music ==
- Arabian Nights (album), by The Ritchie Family
- Arabian Nights (ballet), a 1979 ballet composed by Fikret Amirov
- "Arabian Nights" (song), the opening song from the 1992 animated Disney film Aladdin
- "Arabian Nights", a song from the 1999 album Midnite Vultures by Beck

== Literature ==
- The Arabian Nights: Their Best-Known Tales, a 1909 collection edited by Nora Archibald Smith and Kate Douglas Wiggin
- Arabian Nights, a 1984 novel by Heather Graham Pozzessere
- The Arabian Nights, a 1994 play by Mary Zimmerman
- Arabian Nights, a 1998 play by Dominic Cooke
- Arabian Nights, a 2000 omnibus of three novels: An Arabian Courtship (1990) by Lynne Graham, Desert Hostage (1990) by Sara Wood and Desert Mistress (1996) by Helen Bianchin
- Arabian Nights, a 2015 short play by David Ives

== Other uses ==
- Arabian Nights (comics) (1947), an issue of Classics Illustrated

== See also ==
- The Palace of the Arabian Nights, a 1905 silent fantasy film directed by Georges Méliès
- Scooby-Doo! in Arabian Nights, a 1994 animated telefilm
- Tales of the Arabian Nights (board game) published in 1985
- "Recollections of the Arabian Nights", an 1830 poem by Alfred Tennyson
- Arabian Nights and Days, a 1982 novel by Naguib Mahfouz
- Stories from the Arabian Nights, a 1907 collection written and edited by Laurence Housman
- Arabian Nights, 1914: A Novel About Kaiser Wilheilm II, a 2003 novel by Eric Koch
- Dream Master – Arabian Nights, a 2004 novel by Theresa Breslin
- Arabian Knights (disambiguation)
- Hare-Abian Nights, a 1959 Bugs Bunny cartoon
- One Thousand and One Nights (disambiguation)
- 1001 Arabian Nights (disambiguation)
