= Alif Laila (disambiguation) =

The name Alif Laila is a short form of the original Arabic title of the One Thousand and One Nights—Alif Layla wa-Layla (Arabic: ألف ليلة وليلة—literally "a thousand nights and a night"). Another name is Qissa-e-Alif Laila (Story of the Thousand Nights).

Alif Laila may also refer to various cultural works derived from this collection:

- Alif Laila (1933 film), a Hindi film of 1933
- Alif Laila (film), a 1953 Bollywood film
- Alif Laila,1993–2002 Indian TV series based on One Thousand and One Nights.
- Alif Laila (2020 TV series), broadcast by Dangal in India

== See also ==
- One Thousand and One Nights (disambiguation)
- Arabian Nights (disambiguation)
