= A Thousand Nights =

A Thousand Nights may refer to:

- A Thousand Nights (novel), 2015, by E.K. Johnston
- A Thousand Nights (album), 2008, by Melanie Doane
- "A Thousand Nights" (song), by Maria Arredondo

== See also ==
- Alif Laila (disambiguation)
- One Thousand and One Nights (disambiguation)
