= Granarolo dell'Emilia =

- Comune
- Città di Granarolo dell'Emilia
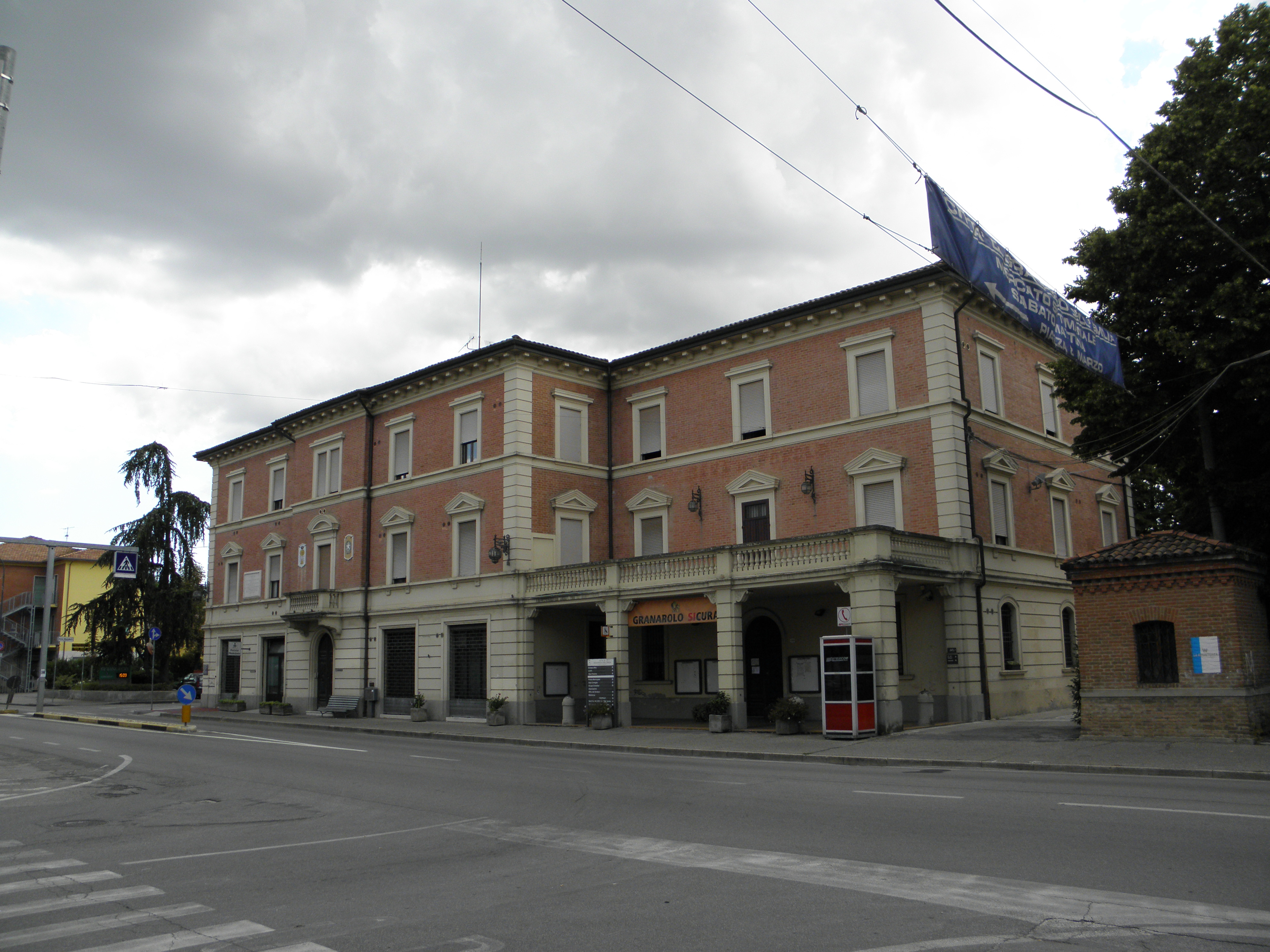
- Town hall

- Coat of arms

- Location within Italy Location within Emilia-Romagna
- Coordinates: 44°33′N 11°27′E
- Country: Italy
- Region: Emilia-Romagna
- Metropolitan city: Bologna (BO)
- Frazioni: Cadriano, Lovoleto, Quarto Inferiore, Viadagola

Government
  - Mayor: Alessandro Ricci

Area
  - Total: 34.4 km^{2} (13.3 sq mi)
- Elevation: 28 m (92 ft)

Population (31 December 2017)
  - Total: 12,032
  - Density: 350/km^{2} (906/sq mi)
- Demonym: Granarolensi
- Time zone: UTC+1 (CET)
  - Summer (DST): UTC+2 (CEST)
- Postal code: 40057
- Dialing code: 051
- Patron saint: St. Vitalis of Milan
- Saint day: April 28
- Website: Official website

Granarolo dell'Emilia (Bolognese: Granarôl) is a comune (municipality) in the Metropolitan City of Bologna in the Italian region Emilia-Romagna, located about 10 kilometres (6 mi) northeast of Bologna. It has about 12,000 inhabitants.

Granarolo dell'Emilia borders the following municipalities: Bentivoglio, Bologna, Budrio, Castel Maggiore, Castenaso, Minerbio.

Dynit, a manga and anime publisher, has its head office in the frazione of Cadriano.

== Twin towns ==
Granarolo dell'Emilia is twinned with:

- Bagnères-de-Bigorre, France (1985)
