= Lee Hyun-se =

South Korean cartoonist (born 1956)

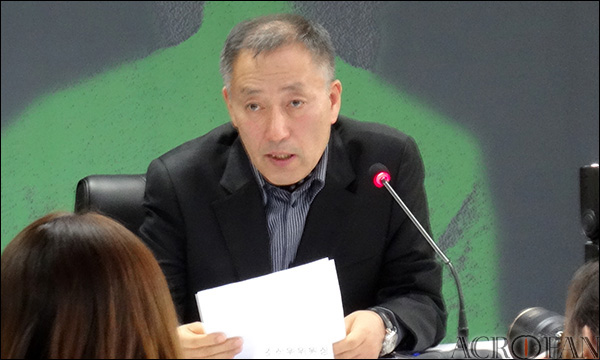
- Lee Hyun-Se in 2014
- Born: June 13, 1956 (age 70); Uljin, South Korea
- Other name: Hyun-se Lee
- Education: Gyeongju High School; Seorabeol Art University
- Occupation: Cartoonist

Lee Hyun-se (Korean: 이현세; Hanja: 李賢世; born June 13, 1956) is a South Korean cartoonist, and the former president of the Korea Cartoonist Association. He is currently the chairman of KOMACON and a professor at the Department of Comic Animation at Sejong University.

Lee is Korea's leading comic ("manhwa") artist. His works have commented on current events and embraced public frustrations.

== Early life and education ==
Lee was born in Uljin, North Gyeongsang Province, South Korea. He grew up in Gyeongju, South Korea, graduating from graduated from Wulseung Elementary School (월성초등학교), Gyeongju Middle School (경주중학교), and Gyeongju High School (경주고등학교).

== Career ==
Lee debuted in 1978 with The River Knows (저 강은 알고있다) that covers the Vietnam War. His major works include A Daunting Team (공포의 외인구단), Mythology of the Heavens (천국의 신화), Ring of Hell (지옥의 링), Nambul: War Stories, Armageddon (아마게돈), Police (폴리스), Birdie (버디), and others. Actor Joe Sang-gu is an old friend of Lee Hyun-se, and he is the real model for Oh Hyae-sung / (Kkachi), the main character of A Daunting Team.

== Filmography ==
- 1978,The River Knows (저 강은 알고있다)
- 1979, Kkachi in Shimonoseki (시모노세키의 까치)
- 1980, The Wind that Blows the Ground (그라운드에 부는 바람)
- 1981, The Last Light of Shimonoseki (시모노세끼의 마지막불빛); Kkachi's Fifth Season (까치의 제5계절)
- 1982, Kkachi's Blue Crab Apple (까치의 푸른능금), A Jackdow of the Border (국경의 갈가마귀), A Dauntless Team (공포의 외인구단); Made the cover of the first issue of monthly publication, Treasure Island (보물섬)
- 1983, Ring of the Wild (야성의 링); Kkachi's Glass Jaw (까치의 유리턱); Ring of Hell (Korean: 지옥의 링)
- 1984, Wanderer Kkachi (떠돌이 까치); Kkachi's Sunny Spot (까치의 양지); The Firebird's Fighting Spirit (불새의 투혼)
- 1985, The High School Baseball Team (고교외인부대); Thawing (해빙; Hanja: 解氷)
- 1986, Bow (활; Japanese Ver.); Run! (뛰어!); Emperor (제왕; Hanja: 帝王)
- 1987, Sing a Dawn, Lions (사자여 새벽을 노래하라); Fury of Kkachi's Head (격정의 까치머리); The Kosmos that Blooms in Winter (겨울에 피는 코스모스); Childish Kkachi (철부지 까치); Roughly Unfortunate Fellows (억세게 재수없는 녀석들)
- 1988, Report on the Daughter-in-Law's Rice Paste (며느리 밥풀에 대한 보고서); Boss (두목); Armageddon (아마게돈) serialized in IQ Jump; Blue Angel (블루엔젤); Karon's Dawn (카론의 새벽); Made the cover of the first issue of a monthly publication, IQ Jump (아이큐점프)
- 1989, Dancing Larva (춤추는 애벌래)
- 1990, Chick Rhapsody (병아리 광시곡)
- 1993, Nambul: War Stories; Police (폴리스)
- 1994, Steep Cliff (초애; Hanja:峭崖)
- 1995, Armageddon (아마게돈; Animation); Golden Flower (황금의 꽃); Love Collection (러브콜렉션) serialized in the newspaper Kyunghyang Shinmun (경향신문; Hanja: 京鄕新聞)
- 1997, Mythology of Heaven (천국의 신화)
- 1999, Dark Dragon (다크드래곤) serialized in The Seoul Daily Sports (스포츠서울); Made the National Police Agency character, Podori (포돌이)
- 2001, Serializing Mythology of Heaven (천국의 신화)
- 2004, Animal Drawing (동물드로잉)
- 2005, Serializing Wolf's Blood (늑대의 피), Made Korean History (한국사)
- 2007, Serializing Birdie (버디)
- 2009, Serializing Bijeongsigong (비정시공); Changcheonsuhoui (창천수호위)
- 2010, Serializing Red Fatale (레드파탈)

== Awards ==
- 1994, Awarded The Fourth Korean Comic Achievement Award (대한민국 만화공로상)
- 1999, Awarded The Third Asia Comic Contest (Hong Kong, 아시아 만화대회) Achievement Award
- 2002, Awarded The Second Gobow Comic Award (고바우만화상)
- 2006, Awarded The Metropolis of Seoul Culture Award (서울특별시 문화상)
- 2007, Awarded Korea Content Awards (대한민국 만화대상) President's Award in the Field of Comics

== See also ==
- Hand of the Dragon
