= Dreamwalker =

Dreamwalker may refer to:

- Oneironaut, a traveler within a dream
- Dreamwalker, a 2000 book by Isobelle Carmody
- "Dreamwalker", a song by Silent Planet from their 2023 album Superbloom
- "Dreamwalkers", a song by Erra from their 2013 album Augment
- The Wheel of Time, a novel series featuring "Dreamwalkers" in its setting
- Alundra, a 1997 video game featuring "Dreamwalkers" in its setting

== See also ==
- Dream Walker (disambiguation)
- The Dreamwalker's Child, a 2005 novel by Steve Voake
