= MC Entertainment =

Russian anime and film distributor

- Industry: multimedia entertainment
- Genre: anime
- Founded: 2000
- Defunct: 2012
- Area served: Russia, Kazakhstan
- Key people: Dmitry Fedotkin (general director)

MC Entertainment was a Russian distributor of anime and films from Japan, United States, Germany, Great Britain, China, Thailand and South Korea. The company, headed by Dmitry Fedotkin, was founded in 2000. As of 2007, it is the largest anime company in Russia. It is also the first Russian company aimed exclusively at the anime market. MC Entertainment was one of the founders of AnimeGid magazine, as well as Moscow Anime Festival and anime*magazine sponsor.

Until 2006 MC Entertainment did not have any rivalries, becoming a monopolist on Russian anime market. In the beginning of 2006 its first competitor XL Media appeared, later was founded other anime companies Mega-Anime and Reanimedia.
