= Arabian Knights (disambiguation) =

Arabian Knights is a 1968–1969 animated segment of the children's TV show The Banana Splits Adventure Hour.

Arabian Knights may also refer to:

- Arabian Knight (character), a Saudi Arabian superhero in the Marvel Comics universe
- "Arabian Knights" (song), 1981, by Siouxsie & the Banshees
- Arabian Knight, alternate title of The Thief and the Cobbler, a 1995 animated film
- Arabian Knight (record producer) (active since 1998), a hip hop producer affiliated with Wu-Tang Clan
- Operation Arabian Knight, a 2010 anti-terrorism sting resulting in the arrest of New Jersey men bound for Somalia

== See also ==
- Arabian Nights (disambiguation)
