= 1001 Arabian Nights =

1001 Arabian Nights may refer to:

- 1001 Arabian Nights (1959 film), a Mr. Magoo animated feature
- "1001 Arabian Nights" (song), 2004, by the Dutch band Ch!pz
- 1001 Arabian Nights: The Adventures of Sinbad, a Grimm Fairy Tales comic book series

== See also ==
- One Thousand and One Nights (disambiguation)
