= Sakura Press =

Russian licensor and publisher of manga

- Industry: Publishing
- Founded: 19 March 2003
- Defunct: 21 November 2016
- Headquarters: 11–23, Rizhskiy proezd, Moscow 129626, Russia
- Area served: Commonwealth of Independent States
- Key people: Sergei Kharlamov (CEO)
- Products: Manga
- Website: sakura-press.ru

Sakura Press (Russian: Сакура-пресс) was a Russian licensor and publisher of manga with headquarters in Moscow. The company was established in 2003. It was headed by general director Sergei Kharlamov. According to their official website, it was the first Russian company who started to publish manga (Ranma ½). The first two volumes of Ranma ½ were released in April 2005. Sakura Press reversed the pages (so called "flopping") in all releases, for which it was criticized by fandom. It stopped publishing manga and updating their site in 2011 and became officially defunct in 2016.

== Licenses ==
- Battle Royale
- Chrono Crusade
- Ranma ½
- Fushigi Yūgi
- Ai Yori Aoshi
- Gunslinger Girl

== Other publications ==
=== anime*magazine ===
anime*magazine
- Editor: Mikhail Ulyanov
- Categories: anime and manga industry
- Circulation: 900
- Publisher: Sakura Press
- Country: Russia
- Based in: Moscow
- Language: Russian
- ISSN: 1810-8644

anime*magazine (abbreviated as am) was a bi-monthly anime and manga news and reviews magazine, published between May 2003 and July 2004. It started as a collaboration project between Sakura Press and the authors of online magazine Animemaniacs Magazine Online (currently known as AniMag or AnimeMagazine Online). Firstly it was all black and white, later became coloured and accompanied with CD. anime*magazine featured review sections of anime, manga, and video games, news, interviews and articles about Japanese culture and history. It was closed in 2004 when the main sponsors, including MC Entertainment, switched to the rival magazine AnimeGid.
