= Mega-Anime =

Russian anime distributor

- Industry: entertainment
- Genre: anime
- Founded: 2005
- Headquarters: Moscow, Russia
- Area served: Russia, CIS countries, Ukraine, Baltic countries
- Owner: Megaliner Group
- Parent: Megaliner Entertainment
- Website: Mega-Anime

Mega-Anime is a Russian distributor of anime content from Japan. It was founded in 2005. It was founded by Megaliner Entertainment.

The company competes with MC Entertainment, fellow Russian anime distributor. The company distributes anime in full Russian dubbing. In 2007, it was announced that Mega-Anime acquired the licenses to Bleach and Death Note, which later happened 2008. The company is based in Moscow.

== Licensed anime ==
The Cancelled indicates that the company has licensed that series but has not done any production and dropped it without releasing it.

The Expired indicates that the company has licensed that series & has released it but the rights have expired.

- Basilisk (expired)
- Burst Angel
- Black Cat
- Bleach
- Blood+
- Claymore (cancelled)
- Death Note
- Evangelion: 1.0 You Are (Not) Alone
- Fafner in the Azure (cancelled)
- Fruits Basket (cancelled)
- Fullmetal Alchemist
- Futakoi Alternative (cancelled)
- Gun Sword
- Heat Guy J
- He Is My Master
- Kurau Phantom Memory (cancelled)
- Love Hina (cancelled)
- Maria-sama ga Miteru
- Mouse
- Noein (cancelled)
- Noir
- Paradise Kiss
- RahXephon (cancelled)
- Rozen Maiden
- Stellvia (cancelled)
- Strait Jacket
- Tenjho Tenge
- Trigun
- Trinity Blood
- X

== See also ==
- MC Entertainment
- Reanimedia
