= Nambul: War Stories =

South Korean manhwa series

- Cover of the Central Park Media edition of Nambul: War Stories vol. 1 (2004), art by Lee Hyun-se

남벌 RR: Nambeol MR: Nambŏl
- Genre: Historical, war
- Author: Lee Hyun-se
- Publisher: (South Korea) Content Wide
- English publisher: NA: CPM Press
- Original run: 1994
- Volumes: 6

Nambul: War Stories (Korean: 남벌; lit. 'Conquering the South') is a South Korean military drama manhwa series, written by Lee Hyun-se first published in 1994. Nambul: War Stories follows the political and personal consequences during an imaginary future conflict between Korea and Japan. Three volumes have been translated into English, by Anh Chul-hyun, and were published by CPM Manhwa in 2004.

== Plot ==
As a second Middle Eastern war drives the world economy toward another crisis, Japan decides to invade Indonesia in search of a new source of oil. Forces are being deployed, and secret alliances are being made. Meanwhile, urban violence explodes onto the streets of Tokyo, and Hae-sung, the leader of a Zainichi Korean teenage mob, gets caught on camera by an NHK reporter as he murders a yakuza boss. (Note: Synopsis up to Book 3; constructed from official synopses.)

Political tensions reach the boiling point as the exposure of Korean concentration camps in Indonesia leads Korea to enter the war. Alliances between neighboring countries are forged as the world readies itself for a massive clash. In the midst of the chaos, Hae-sung must hide from the police and the yakuza, both of whom want to find and execute him.

The ramifications of Korea's war against Japan are felt closer to home as Korean citizens living in Japan are branded as "outsiders". The tragedy of Auschwitz repeats itself as these people are forced to wear identifying armbands, are ostracized by the Japanese populace and forced into Korean ghettos. The segregation takes a turn for the worse as Koreans are herded onto trains and sent to war camps. All the while, Japanese and Korean armed forces wage all-out war against each other on land, sea and air.

The lucky ones, like Yusung and Uhmji, lose their jobs but are allowed to return home to the Oh family residence. With the fugitive Hae-Sung now in police custody, the yakuza look to his family for revenge.

== Characters ==
=== Hae-sung ===
Leader of "The Korean Dogs", a vicious street gang, where he is known under the name "The Dog" (Korean: 진돗개; Jindos-Gae). He feels that he is above the law, and that he can do whatever he wants, whenever he wants. People fear him, and he is quick to use violence to prove a point. He seems to be totally in control, but there are three people that make him question that feeling: an abusive father that treats him like a dog, a rich brother (Yusung) that pays much money to keep Hae-sung out of trouble, and Uhmji, the woman he loves. After being caught on camera by an NHK reporter as he murders a yakuza boss, he becomes a fugitive from both the law and the yakuza.

=== Yusung (Hideo) ===
Hae-sung's brother is one of the richest men in Japan. A highly respected businessman that can make a million just by punching some numbers on a keyboard, Yusung secretly helps his brother get out of trouble by paying for his mistakes. Having a Japanese wife (Eiko) and a daughter, his life seems almost perfect, but his strong sense of patriotic duty toward Korea is getting stronger. As the war between the two countries starts and Koreans in Japan are increasingly persecuted, he loses this position of power.

=== Uhmji (Rie) ===
Yusung's former lover left two years ago, leaving her life behind and making it on her own. After becoming a police officer, she gets reintroduced to her old flame. She also finds out that Hae-sung secretly has feelings for her. As Koreans in Japan are persecuted and sent to war camps, she and Hyeri are forced to serve guards as comfort women.

== See also ==
- Anti-Japanese sentiment in Korea
