= Alif Laila (1933 film) =

1933 Indian Hindi language film

- Directed by: Balwant Bhatt; Shanti Dave
- Based on: One Thousand and One Nights
- Starring: Zohrajan; Nazir; Bashir; Gul Banu; Lallubhai
- Music by: Kikubhai Yagnik
- Production company: Royal Cinetone
- Release date: 1933
- Country: India
- Language: Hindi

Alif Laila is a 1933 Indian Hindi language fantasy film jointly directed by Balwant Bhatt and Shanti Dave inspired by the legendery folk tales One Thousand and One Nights. The film was released in 1933 under the banner of for Royal Cinetone.

== Cast ==
- Zohrajan
- Nazir
- Bashir
- Gul Banu
- Lallubhai
- M. Esmail
- Pawar

== External link ==
- Alif Laila at IMDb
