= Shin Vision =

Anime and manga publishing company

- Industry: publishing
- Founded: 2002
- Defunct: 2008 (Bankruptcy)
- Headquarters: Rome, Italy
- Key people: Francesco Di Sanzo (founder)
- Products: DVD, VHS, merchandising

Shin Vision Srl was an Italian company based in Rome that published Japanese anime and manga, and operated in the merchandising, film/live action, non-Japanese cartoons, and music industries. Formed on 12 September 2002, it was declared bankrupt by the Court of Rome on May 7, 2008.

== History ==
Shin Vision was born after vision discrepancies between Federico Colpi and Francesco Di Sanzo, both key figures of former publisher Dynamic Italia. Di Sanzo left the company and, along with part of the Dynamic staff, founded Shin Vision, which started operating on 20 September 2002. Later on Dynamic Italia changed its name to Dynit and Federico Colpi eventually returned as head of d/visual (Dynamic Planning).

Over time Shin Vision acquired a number of licenses and realized several products, commercialized through Pan Distribuzione, Mondo Home Entertainment and DNC, boasting among its customers MTV, GXT, De Agostini, Mediaset and Raidue. However, in spring 2007, after drastically slowing down the rate of releases and interrupting the publication of several series, among which RahXephon, Wolf's Rain and Gundam Wing, it reached an agreement for the distribution of its video products with EXA Media, slowly resuming some titles, among which Captain Herlock - The endless odyssey OAV. In October 2007 the entire catalogue of licenses was relieved from EXA Cinema, division of EXA Media, that published it under the brand Fool Frame; a few months later Shin Vision went bankrupt.

== Products ==
Published anime

- Abenobashi (TV series) (Re-licensed by Yamato Video)
- One Piece (TV series, interrupted)
- Captain Herlock - The Endless Odyssey (OAV, EXA/Shin Vision mark)
- Cardcaptor Sakura: The Movie (film) (Re-licensed by Yamato Video)
- Cinderella Boy (TV series)
- Cowboy Bebop (TV series) (Re-licensed by Dynit)
- Full Metal Panic! (TV series) (Re-licensed by Dynit)
- Full Metal Panic? Fumoffu (TV series, interrupted after vol.5) (Re-licensed by Dynit)
- Gundam Wing (serie TV, interrupted after vol.6)
- Hunter × Hunter (TV series, interrupted)
- Initial D (TV series, interrupted)
- Zaion: I Wish You Were Here (OAV)
- Shin hokuto no ken (OAV) (Re-licensed by Yamato Video)
- Last Exile (TV series) (Re-licensed by Dynit)
- Lost Universe (TV series)
- Lupin III - Bye-Bye Liberty Crisis (TV special)
- Lupin III - Farewell to Nostradamus (film)
- Lupin III - $1 Money Wars (TV special)
- Lupin III - Da Capo of Love: Fujiko's Unlucky Days (TV special)
- Lupin III - Tokyo Crisis (TV special)
- My Patrasche (TV series)
- Najica Blitz Tactics (TV series)
- Night Warriors: Darkstalkers' Revenge (OAV)
- Pretty Soldier Sailormoon R - The Movie (film)
- RahXephon (TV series, interrupted after vol. 2)
- Remi, Nobody's Girl (TV series)
- Sailor Moon (TV series, interrupted) (Re-licensed by Dynit)
- Slayers (TV series, interrupted)
- Trigun (TV series) (Re-licensed by Dynit)
- Violence Jack (OAV)
- Wolf's Rain (TV series, volumes 1-6, 9 and 10) (Re-licensed by Yamato Video)

Live action

- Azumi (live action)
- Bichunmoo (live action film)
- Cheonnyeon ho (live action film)
- Volcano High (live action film)

Non-Japanese animated series

- SpongeBob SquarePants

Published manga

- BR II - Blitz Royale
- Gunslinger Girl (interrupted after second volume)
- Pilgrim Jäger (interrupted after second volume)
- Rai (interrupted at ninth volume)
- The Calling
- Wolf's Rain
