= One Thousand and One Nights (disambiguation) =

One Thousand and One Nights is a collection of Middle Eastern folk tales compiled in Arabic during the Islamic Golden Age.

One Thousand and One Nights or variants may also refer to:

== Film and television ==
- A Thousand and One Nights (1945 film), an American adventure fantasy comedy
- A Thousand and One Nights with Toho, a 1947 black-and-white Japanese film
- A Thousand and One Nights (1958 film), a Mexican film
- 1001 Nights (1968 film), directed by José María Elorrieta
- A Thousand and One Nights (1969 film), a Japanese adult animated fantasy
- 1001 Nights (1990 film), a French-Italian fantasy film
- Arabian Nights (2015 film) (As Mil e uma Noites 'One Thousand and One Nights'), a Portuguese three-part drama film
- Alf Laila Wa Laila ('One Thousand and One Nights'), a 1995 Egyptian TV series starring Yehia El-Fakharany
- Binbir Gece ('One Thousand and One Nights'), a Turkish TV series 2006–2009
- One Thousand and One Nights: Aladdin and Sherazade, a 2012 Italian TV miniseries with Marco Bocci
- 1001 Nights (TV series), a Canadian animated series 2011–12

== Literature ==
- Les mille et une nuits, an 18th century French translation of One Thousand and One Nights by Antoine Galland
- The Book of the Thousand Nights and a Night, an 1888 English translation of One Thousand and One Nights by Richard Francis Burton
- Le livre des mille nuits et une nuit, a 1926–1932 French translation of One Thousand and One Nights by J. C. Mardrus
- One Thousand and One Nights' Story, a manga series by Monkey Punch
- One Thousand and One Nights (manhwa), a Korean comic

== Music ==
- "A Thousand and One Nights" (Smash song), 2012
- "1001 Nights", a 2006 song by Systems in Blue
- "1001 Nights", a song by Crazy Frog from the 2012 album Crazy Hits
- "Alf Leila We Leila" ('One Thousand and One Nights'), a single by Assala
- "Tausend und eine Nacht" ('Thousand and One Nights'), an 1871 waltz by Johann Strauss II
- "Take Me to Your Heaven" (song), or Tusen och en natt (Swedish, 'A thousand and one night'), by Charlotte Nilsson, 1999

== Other uses ==
- "1001 Nights", a 2012 Doctor Who: The Monthly Adventures audio drama
- Kampfgruppe 1001 Nights, a German World War II unit

== See also ==
- A Thousand Nights (disambiguation)
- 1001 Arabian Nights (disambiguation)
- Alif Laila (disambiguation)
- One Hundred and One Nights
