= Recollections of the Arabian Nights =

1930 poem by Alfred Tennyson

- by Alfred Tennyson
- Meter: Iambic tetrameter
- Publication date: 1830; 1842; 1857
- Lines: 154

Full text
- Recollections of the Arabian Nights at Wikisource

"Recollections of the Arabian Nights" is a poem by Alfred Tennyson, first published in 1830. It is one of his early works, inspired by the tales of One Thousand and One Nights.

== Analysis ==
With this poem should be compared the description of Harun al Rashid’s Garden of Gladness in the story of Nur-al-din Ali and the damsel Anis al Talis in the Thirty-Sixth Night.

According to John Churton Collins, the style appears to have been modelled on Coleridge’s Kubla Khan and Lewti, and the influence of Coleridge is very perceptible throughout the poem.

== Text ==
When the breeze of a joyful dawn blew free In the silken sail of infancy, The tide of time flow’d back with me, The forward-flowing tide of time; And many a sheeny summer-morn, Adown the Tigris I was borne, By Bagdat’s shrines of fretted gold, High-walled gardens green and old; True Mussulman was I and sworn, For it was in the golden prime (Note: “Golden prime” from Shakespeare. “That cropp’d the golden prime of this sweet prince.” (Rich. III., i., sc. ii., 248.)); Of good Haroun Alraschid. Anight my shallop, rustling thro’ (Note: 1830. Through.); The low and bloomed foliage, drove The fragrant, glistening deeps, and clove The citron-shadows in the blue: By garden porches on the brim, The costly doors flung open wide, Gold glittering thro’ (Note: 1830. Through.) lamplight dim, And broider’d sofas (Note: 1830 and 1842. Sophas.) on each side: In sooth it was a goodly time, For it was in the golden prime Of good Haroun Alraschid. Often, where clear-stemm’d platans guard The outlet, did I turn away The boat-head down a broad canal From the main river sluiced, where all The sloping of the moon-lit sward Was damask-work, and deep inlay Of braided blooms (Note: 1830. Breaded blosms.) unmown, which crept Adown to where the waters slept. A goodly place, a goodly time, For it was in the golden prime Of good Haroun Alraschid. A motion from the river won Ridged the smooth level, bearing on My shallop thro’ the star-strown calm, Until another night in night I enter’d, from the clearer light, Imbower’d vaults of pillar’d palm, Imprisoning sweets, which, as they clomb Heavenward, were stay’d beneath the dome Of hollow boughs.—A goodly time, For it was in the golden prime Of good Haroun Alraschid. Still onward; and the clear canal Is rounded to as clear a lake. From the green rivage many a fall Of diamond rillets musical, Thro’ little crystal (Note: 1830. Through crystal.) arches low Down from the central fountain’s flow Fall’n silver-chiming, seem’d to shake The sparkling flints beneath the prow. A goodly place, a goodly time, For it was in the golden prime Of good Haroun Alraschid.	Above thro’ (Note: 1830. Through.) many a bowery turn A walk with vary-colour’d shells Wander’d engrain’d. On either side All round about the fragrant marge From fluted vase, and brazen urn In order, eastern flowers large, Some dropping low their crimson bells Half-closed, and others studded wide With disks and tiars, fed the time With odour in the golden prime Of good Haroun Alraschid. Far off, and where the lemon-grove In closest coverture upsprung, The living airs of middle night Died round the bulbul (Note: “Bulbul” is the Persian for nightingale. Cf. Princes, iv., 104:—“O Bulbul, any rose of Gulistan / Shall brush her veil”.) as he sung; Not he: but something which possess’d The darkness of the world, delight, Life, anguish, death, immortal love, Ceasing not, mingled, unrepress’d. Apart from place, withholding (Note: 1830. Withholding. So 1842, 1843, 1845.) time, But flattering the golden prime Of good Haroun Alraschid. Black the (Note: 1830. Blackgreen.) garden-bowers and grots Slumber’d: the solemn palms were ranged Above, unwoo’d of summer wind: A sudden splendour from behind Flush’d all the leaves with rich gold-green, And, flowing rapidly between Their interspaces, counterchanged The level lake with diamond-plots Of dark and bright. (Note: 1830. Of saffron light.) A lovely time, For it was in the golden prime Of good Haroun Alraschid. Dark-blue the deep sphere overhead, Distinct with vivid stars inlaid, (Note: 1830. Unrayed.); Grew darker from that under-flame: So, leaping lightly from the boat, With silver anchor left afloat, In marvel whence that glory came Upon me, as in sleep I sank In cool soft turf upon the bank, Entranced with that place and time, So worthy of the golden prime Of good Haroun Alraschid. Thence thro’ the garden I was drawn— (Note: 1830. Through ... borne.); A realm of pleasance, many a mound, And many a shadow-chequer’d lawn Full of the city’s stilly sound, (Note: Shakespeare has the same expression: “The hum of either army stilly sounds”. (Henry V., act iv., prol.)); And deep myrrh-thickets blowing round The stately cedar, tamarisks, Thick rosaries (Note: 1842. Roseries.) of scented thorn, Tall orient shrubs, and obelisks Graven with emblems of the time, In honour of the golden prime Of good Haroun Alraschid.	With dazed vision unawares From the long alley’s latticed shade Emerged, I came upon the great Pavilion of the Caliphat. Right to the carven cedarn doors, Flung inward over spangled floors, Broad-based flights of marble stairs Ran up with golden balustrade, After the fashion of the time, And humour of the golden prime Of good Haroun Alraschid. The fourscore windows all alight As with the quintessence of flame, A million tapers flaring bright From twisted silvers look’d (Note: 1830. Wreathed.) to shame The hollow-vaulted dark, and stream’d Upon the mooned domes aloof In inmost Bagdat, till there seem’d Hundreds of crescents on the roof Of night new-risen, that marvellous time, To celebrate the golden prime Of good Haroun Alraschid. Then stole I up, and trancedly Gazed on the Persian girl alone, Serene with argent-lidded eyes Amorous, and lashes like to rays Of darkness, and a brow of pearl Tressed with redolent ebony, In many a dark delicious curl, Flowing beneath (Note: 1830. Below.) her rose-hued zone; The sweetest lady of the time, Well worthy of the golden prime Of good Haroun Alraschid. Six columns, three on either side, Pure silver, underpropt (Note: 1830. Underpropped. 1842. Underpropp’d.) a rich Throne of the (Note: 1830. O’ the.) massive ore, from which Down-droop’d, in many a floating fold, Engarlanded and diaper’d With inwrought flowers, a cloth of gold. Thereon, his deep eye laughter-stirr’d With merriment of kingly pride, Sole star of all that place and time, I saw him—in his golden prime, Tʜᴇ Gᴏᴏᴅ Hᴀʀᴏᴜɴ Aʟʀᴀsᴄʜɪᴅ!

== Illustrations ==
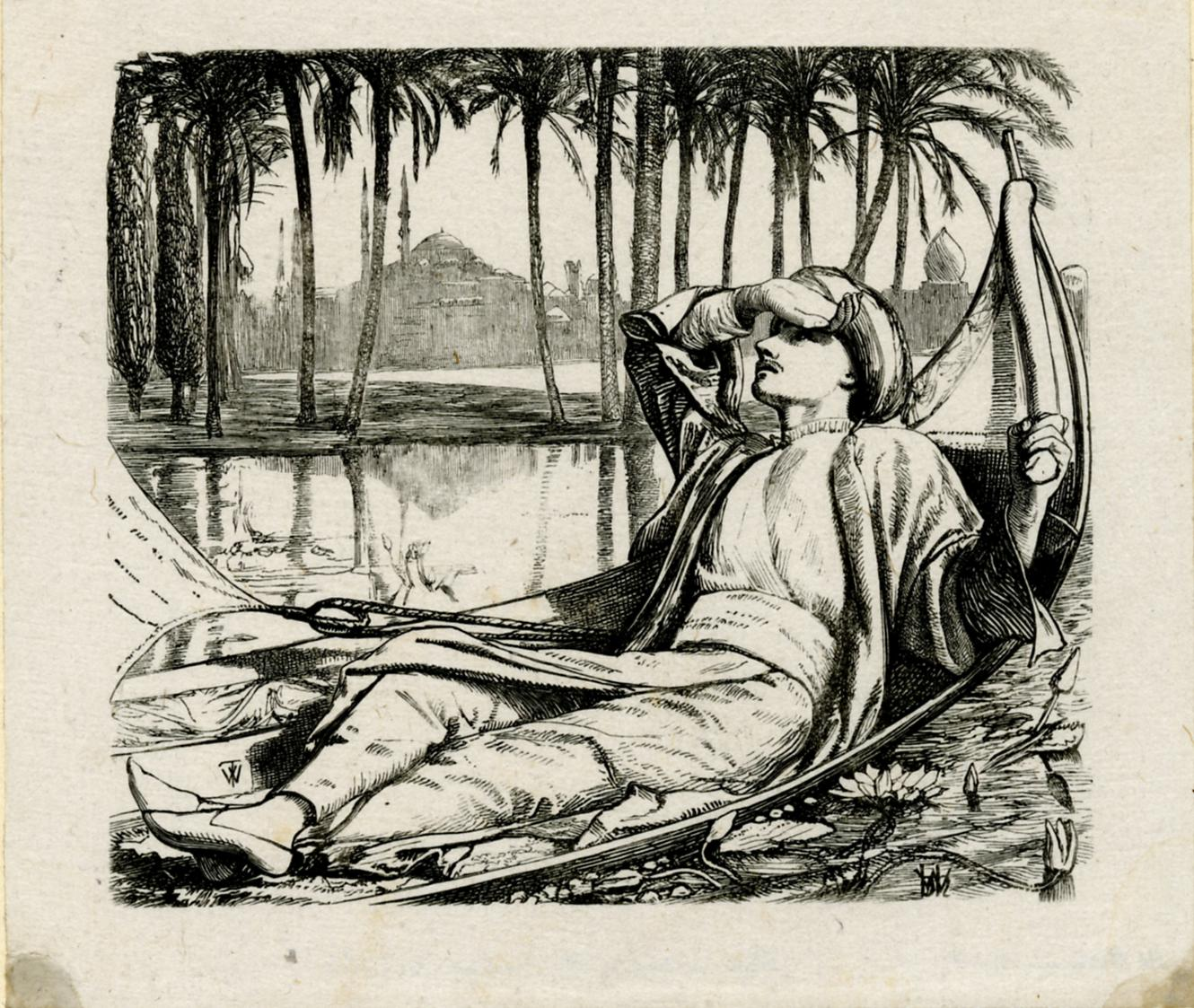
Block cut by Thomas Williams after William Holman Hunt: Man lying in a low boat on water with palm trees and mosque in the background; proof of the block to illustrate Tennyson, Poems (Edward Moxon, 1857)

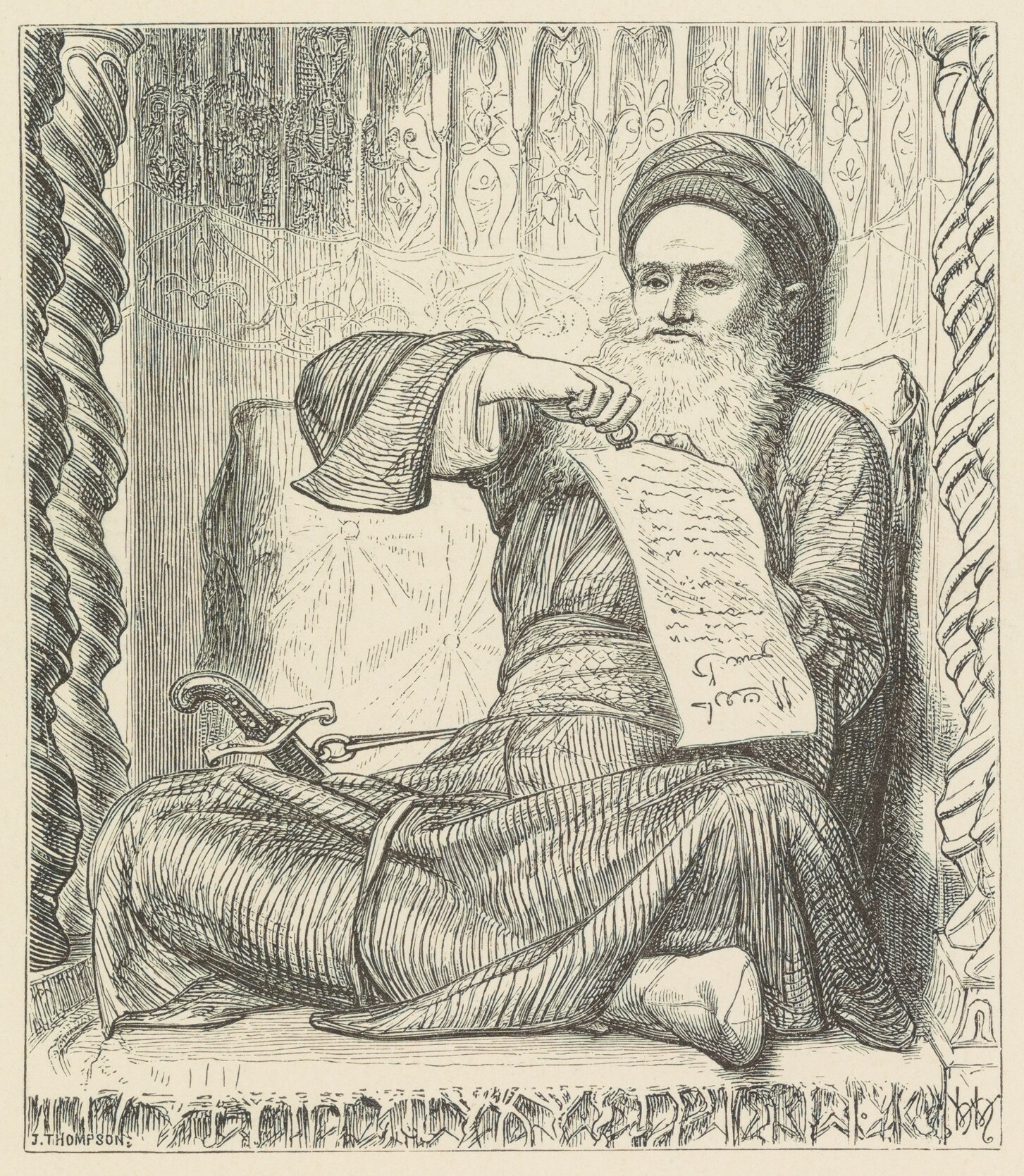
Wood engraving by the Dalziels after William Holman Hunt, 1857

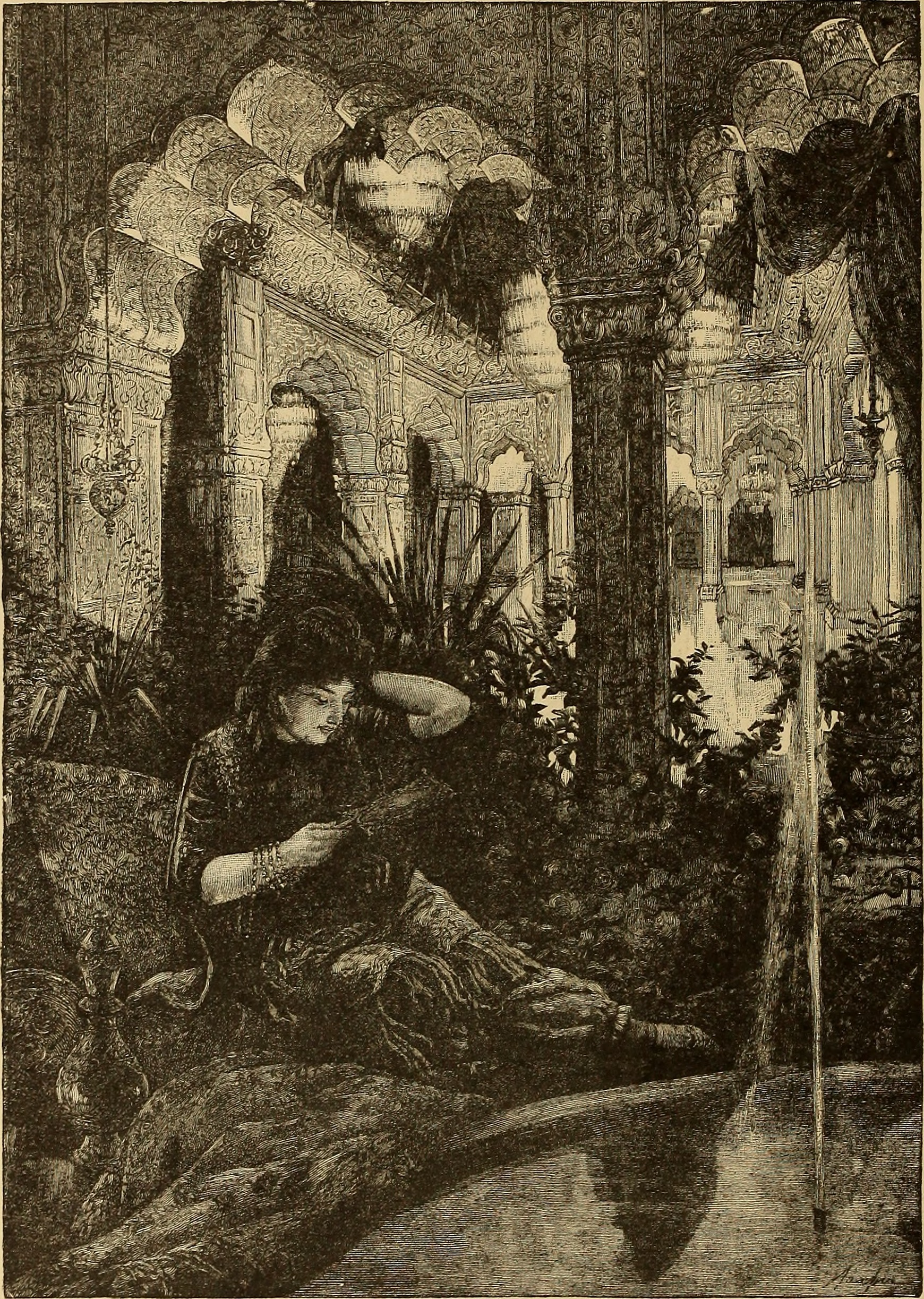
Recollections of the Arabrian Nights. Drawn by William St. John Harper, 1889

== See also ==
- Arabian Nights
- Orientalism

== Sources ==
- Collins, John Churton, ed. (1900). The Early Poems of Alfred, Lord Tennyson. London: Methuen & Co. pp. xv, 13–17.
