= Mangafan =

Hungarian publishing company

Mangafan is a Hungarian manga publisher, located in Szigetszentmiklós near Budapest, Hungary. It was founded in 2006. Since May, 2007, they also publish a monthly magazine dealing with manga, anime and Japanese culture, called Mondo.

== Published manga ==
- Naruto 1-28
- Rurouni Kenshin 1-16
- Love Com 1-14

== Finished manga/manhwa publish ==
- ALIVE
- Blade of the Phantom Master (+ Gaiden)
- Chrono Crusade
- Darker than Black
- Death Note
- Hellsing
- Nana (hiatus)
- Shirahime-Syo: Snow Goddess Tales
- Vampire Knight

== Published anime DVD ==
- Fullmetal Alchemist 1 (ep. 1–4)
- Fullmetal Alchemist 2 (ep. 5–8)
- Fullmetal Alchemist 3 (ep. 9–12)
- Fullmetal Alchemist 4 (ep. 13–16)
- Fullmetal Alchemist 5 (ep. 17–20)
- Death Note 1 (ep. 1–4)
- Death Note 2 (ep. 5–8)
- Death Note 3 (ep. 9–12)
- Death Note 4 (ep. 13–16)
- Death Note 5 (ep. 17–20)
- Death Note 6 (ep. 21–24)
- Death Note 7 (ep. 25–28)
- Bleach 1 (ep. 1–4)
- Bleach 2 (ep. 5–8)
- Bleach 3 (ep. 9–12)
- Bleach 4 (ep. 13–16)
- Bleach 5 (ep. 17–20)
- Kyorochan 1 (ep. 1–12)
- Death Note box (ep. 1-20)
- Death Note box 2 (ep. 21–37)
- Bleach box (ep. 1-20)
- Bleach box 2 (ep. 21–41)
