= Dream Walker (comic) =

Singaporean comic series by Yeo Hui Xuan

Dream Walker is a Singapore comic written and illustrated by Yeo Hui Xuan.

== Plot ==
One night, a teenage girl Yume learns she is a Dream Walker, a person who protects people in their dreams from an unidentified species called Bouma. Mentored by a talking cat named Muca, she later befriends Ken and Belle. Later on, they find Yume's cousin Yuuka, who is also a Dream Walker.

== Dream Walker main series ==
There are currently 3 series of Dream Walker comics.

=== Dream Walker ===
There are 6 volumes under the title Dream Walker:

- Volume 1: The Dreamscape
- Volume 2: A Child's Dream
- Volume 3: A New Power Awakens
- Volume 4: Friend Or Foe
- Volume 5: Dreamscape Showdown (Part I)
- Volume 6: Dreamscape Showdown (Part II Finale)

=== Dream Walker Five Pillars ===
Sequel to Dream Walker. There are 2 volumes under the title Dreamscape Five Pillars:

- Volume 1: Dreamscape Five Pillars (Part I)
- Volume 2: Dreamscape Five Pillars (Part II)

=== Dream Walker Reality World ===
Sequel to Dream Walker Five Pillars. There are 3 volumes under the title Dream Walker The Reality World:

- Volume 1: The Reality World (Part I)
- Volume 2: The Reality World (Part II)
- Volume 3: The Reality World (Part III)

== Dream Walker in other media ==
=== Dream Walker R･G･B ===
Single volume side story under the title R･G･B – Dream Walker Characters' Stories.

Consists of three individual character stories for Yume, Ken, and Muca.

=== Dream Walker Illustration Book ===
Compilation of various Dream Walker artwork. There currently 3 illustration books:

- Maya Blue
- Amethyst
- Imperial

== Characters ==
=== Main characters ===
==== Yume ====
Nicknamed Yuu, she is the heroine of the story. A teenage girl who can control Dreamscape powers, Yume is kindhearted and strong-willed, but also highly irritable. Yume possesses extraordinary spiritual power. Her weapon of choice is a pair of rods.

==== Muca ====
Yume's superior, a talking cat. He is a member of the Dreamscape Special Forces. Night Lynx of the Five Pillars. Muca assumes his human form only in the Dreamscape. Uses his claws as his weapon.

==== Ken ====
Yume's classmate, and a fellow Dream Walker. Ken is a genius who surpasses Yume in Dreamscape power, academic performance, and sports. He often enjoys teasing Yume and Belle. Uses a chain as his weapon.

==== Belle ====
Yume's enemy in her first mission. Once an enemy, Belle has since defected to Yume's side. She is able to create all sorts of weapons with her childish but extremely vivid imagination. Bell is fond of Yume and Muca, but dislikes Ken.

=== Five Pillars ===
==== Night Lynx ====
Currently held by Muca. Previously held by Yuu Yuan and Scarlett.

==== Jade Rabbit ====
Currently held by Ziera. Ziera's speciality is in defensive skills, being able to create barriers and heal others, and her responsibility is to repair rifts in the Dreamscape. Ziera's true form is a rabbit.

==== White Owl ====
Currently held by Snowden. Snowden's speciality is in tricking his opponents, creating clones of himself to deceive opponents. He is the fastest among the Five Pillars, and usually often employs long range tactics like spying or attacking his enemies from long range. Snowden's true form is an owl.

==== Moon Rat ====
Currently held by Mizuki. Mizuki's speciality is in trapping techniques, often setting up traps to ambush her opponents. She is the hardest to detect among the Five Pillars, and is usually sent for close range espionage. Mizuki's true form is a rat.

==== Black Mastif ====
Currently held by Damien. Damien's speciality is his strength and power, preferring to overwhelm his opponents through brute force and aggressive combat. He is the strongest among the Five Pillars. Damien's true form is a dog.

=== Antagonists ===
==== Leo/Man in robe ====
Has shown the ability to control Boumas and Shapeshifter Boumas, but his true power is unknown.

==== Shuang Yue ====
The mastermind behind the chaos in the Dreamscape. Shuang Yue is the superior of Marine, Clay, and Carter. He is also the younger brother of Wu Yue. Wanting Yume's powers for himself, he throws the Dreamscape into chaos. Shuang Yue is the CEO of a multinational company in the real world.

==== Marine ====
Works with Shuang Yue. A proud and competitive girl, Marine refuses to fight weak people. Uses a giant scythe as her weapon.

==== Clay ====
Works with Shuang Yue.. Clay holds great respect and admiration for Shuang Yue. He is able to create and manipulate clones of himself, and his cape is a teleportation device.

==== Carter ====
Works with Shuang Yue. A boy Belle met in the Dreamscape, he seems to enjoy playing games and making friends. Carter has the ability to transform his opponent's weapons into cards.

==== Huxley ====
A former professor in the Dreamscape's science department. Huxley's experiments are unethical, and he tends to kidnap both Dream Walkers and Boumas to use in his experiments. Eventually expelled for going against the laws of nature. Huxley has great enmity towards Yuu Ying.

==== Bouma ====
Monsters roaming the Dreamscape, creators of nightmares and devourers of souls, each Bouma possesses a unique appearance and voice. Their strength varies according to a range of colours - white, black, green, blue, and red - with white being the weakest and red being the strongest. A modified Bouma known as a Shapeshifter Bouma also exists. A creation of Huxley, these heavily modified Boumas are capable of transforming into anyone or anything, and are stronger than the normal Boumas.

=== Others characters ===
==== Yuu Ying ====
Yume's father, an interior designer who is often away from home, and Yuu Yuan's younger brother. He is a jovial homemaker, as well as a Dream Walker and Muca's senior.

==== Scarlett ====
Yume's mother, Flora's younger sister, and a Master Dream Walker. Inherited the title of Night Lynx after the death of Yuu Yuan. Passed down the title of Night Lynx to Yuu Ying after marrying him and giving birth to Yume.

==== Yuu Yuan ====
Yuuka's father, Yuu Ying's elder brother, and a Master Dream walker. Previously held the title of Night Lynx. Killed by Red Boumas while on a mission to eliminate them.

==== Flora ====
Yuuka's mother, Scarlett's elder sister, and a Master Dream Walker. She was killed by Red Boumas while on a mission to eliminate them.

==== Yuuka ====
Yume's maternal cousin, often called "sis" by Yume. Yuuka was a Dream Walker, and was also Shuang Yue's instructor. Missing since the Crimson War, Yuuka is the key to numerous mysteries.

==== Wu Yue ====
Master Dream Walker and Shuang Yue's older brother. A man of few words, he joins Yume in order to bring down Shuang Yue. Being a police officer in the real world, Wu Yue is proficient with guns.
