= Reanimedia =

Anime distributor working on Russian editions

- Company type: Private
- Industry: entertainment
- Genre: anime
- Predecessor: XL Media
- Founded: 2007
- Headquarters: Voronezh, Russia
- Area served: Russia, Belarus, Kazakhstan, Baltic countries
- Key people: Oleg Shevchenko; Artem Tolstobrov; Stepan Shashkin
- Products: DVD, Blu-Ray, books
- Parent: Reanimedia Japan
- Website: reanimedia.ru

Reanimedia is an anime distributor in Russia, Belarus, Kazakhstan and the Baltic States, working in cooperation with Reanimedia Japan. The company was founded in 2007.

The main declared objective of the company is to distribute Russian editions of notable anime titles that approach Japanese standards of image quality, packaging and additional materials. The company also works as a publisher and supports local anime festivals, clubs of interest and other anime-related events.

== History ==
Reanimedia was founded in mid-2007 as a successor of XL Media

On October 22, 2007, Reanimedia announced that it was planning to acquire XL Media. Consolidation between the two companies was expected to finish by February 2008. However, on May 6, 2008, Reanimedia announced that the agreement had been cancelled due to "irreconcilable differences" between the firms. XL Media employees who had previously joined Reanimedia continued working for their new employer. XL Media was acquired by a third party and continued working with new employees.

The dubbing studio, which was originally created in October 2005 to perform dubbing of OVA Tristia and later performed a number of dubbing works for XL Media (see List of works for XL Media, below), became a part of Reanimedia in 2007.

At the beginning of 2008, Reanimedia released its first products: Pet Shop of Horrors and Five centimeters per second.

On June 1, 2009, Reanimedia opened its own online store.

== Employees ==
Staff

- Artem Tolstobrov — CEO
- Stepan Shashkin — general producer
- Oleg Shevchenko — CFO
- Andrey Petrov — director of development
- Aleksandr Filchenko — dubbing director
- Valery Korneev — art director
- Lidiya Kulikova — editor in chief

Dubbing actors

Information about the dubbing actors can be found at Reanimedia's site.

Translators

Translator	Anime titles translated into Russian
Igor Skochinsky	The Girl Who Leapt Through Time
Nikolay Karaev	Five centimeters per second The Melancholy of Haruhi Suzumiya (TV-1); Charcoal Feather Federation
Pavel Rukavitsyn	Pet Shop of Horrors
Natalya Rumak	Diebaster: Reach for the sky – 2 The Disappearance of Haruhi Suzumiya; The Melancholy of Haruhi Suzumiya (TV-2)
Lev Grinberg	Gurren-Lagann
Oleg Bugutsky	Spice and Wolf

== List of works ==
=== List of anime licenses ===
Year	Title
2007	Pet Shop of Horrors
2007	Five centimeters per second (Byōsoku Go Senchimētoru)
2007	The Girl Who Leapt Through Time (Toki o Kakeru Shōjo)
2007	The Melancholy of Haruhi Suzumiya (TV-1) (Suzumiya Haruhi no Yūutsu)
2008	Diebaster: Reach for the sky – 2 (Toppu o Nerae Tsū! 2)
2008	Gurren-Lagann (Tengen Toppa Gurrenn-Lagann)
2008	Charcoal Feather Federation (Haibane Renmei)
2009	Spice and Wolf (Ookami to Koushinryou)
2010	The Melancholy of Haruhi Suzumiya (TV-2) (Suzumiya Haruhi no Yūutsu)
2010	The Disappearance of Haruhi Suzumiya (Suzumiya Haruhi no Shōshitsu)
2011	Children Who Chase Lost Voices from Deep Below (Hoshi o Ou Kodomo)
2012	Berserk Golden Age Arc (Berserk Ōgon Jidai-Hen): Berserk Golden Age Arc I: Egg of the Supreme Ruler (Berserk Ōgon Jidai-Hen I: Haō no Tamago); Berserk Golden Age Arc II: The Battle for Doldrey (Berserk Ōgon Jidai-Hen II: Doldrey Kōryaku); Berserk Golden Age Arc III: Descent (Berserk Ōgon Jidai-Hen III: Kōrin)
2012	A Letter to Momo (Momo e no Tegami)
2012	Blood-C: The Last Dark
2012	Book Girl (Gekijōban Bungaku Shōjo)
2012	Wolf Children Ame and Yuki (Ōkami Kodomo no Ame to Yuki)
2012	Summer Wars (Samā Wōzu)
2013	Evangelion: 2.22 You Can [Not] Advance (Evangelion Shin Gekijouban: Ha)
2013	Evangelion: 3.33 You Can [Not] Redo (Evangelion Shin Gekijouban: Q)
2013	The Garden of Words (Kotonoha no Niwa)

=== List of book licenses ===
2009	Five centimeters per second (Byōsoku Go Senchimētoru»)

=== List of works for XL Media ===
The dubbing studio, which has been a part of Reanimedia since 2007, was originally created in October 2005 to perform dubbing of OVA Tristia for XL Media. In 2005–2007, the studio was working for XL Media and performed dubbing of the following titles:

2005	Tristia (Aoi Umi no Tristia)
2006	The Eternity You Desire (Kimi ga Nozomu Eien)
2006	Wolf's Rain (Urufuzu Rein)
2006	Voices of a Distant Star (Hoshi no Koe)
2006	The Place Promised in Our Early Days (Kumo no Mukō, Yakusoku no Basho)
2006	Le Portrait de Petit Cossette (Kozetto no Shōzō)
2007	Serial Experiments Lain

=== List of works in cooperation ===
==== Cinema Prestige ====
Reanimedia performed dubbing of the following titles:

2009	Taro, the son of the dragon (Tatsu no Ko Tarou)
2009	Treasure Island (Dobutsu Takarajima)
2009	Ali Baba and the Forty Thieves (Alibaba to Yonjubiki no Tozuku)
2009	Flying Phantom Ship (Sora Tobu Yureisen)
2009	The Return of Puss in Boots (Nagagutsu Sanjuushi)
2010	The Adventures of Gulliver (Gulliver no Uchuu Ryokou)

==== Istari comics ====
The following manga was produced in cooperation with Reanimedia:

2009	Spice and Wolf (Ookami to Koushinryou)

==== Mega-Anime ====
Reanimedia undertakes preparation for publication (including dubbing and mastering) of several works licensed by Mega-Anime:

2010	Evangelion: 1.11 You are (not) alone
2011	Paradise Kiss (Paradaisu Kisu)

==== Russian Cinema Council (RUSCICO) ====
Reanimedia performs dubbing of the following anime titles:

2010	Princess Mononoke (Mononoke Hime)
2012	From Up on Poppy Hill (Kokuriko-zaka Kara)

==== XL Media ====
Reanimedia undertook preparation for publication (including dubbing and mastering) of the following work licensed by XL Media:

2012	Magical Shopping Arcade Abenobashi (Abenobashi Mahō Shōtengai)

== Crowd funding projects ==
On May 10, 2011, Reanimedia started a crowd funding project People's License. The purpose of the project was to license Makoto Shinkai's anime Children Who Chase Lost Voices from Deep Below (Hoshi o Ou Kodomo) which was released in Japan on May 7, 2011. On May 24, 2011, Reanimedia reported that the project was successful, and Reanimedia began preparations for signing a license agreement. The movie was successfully licensed by September 28, 2011, demonstrated in theaters since November, 2011 and released on DVD in 2012. The participants of People's License were offered a limited DVD edition of the movie.

List of the crowd funding projects of Reanimedia:

Year	Title of the project	Anime titles to be licensed	Result of the project
2011	People's License	Children Who Chase Lost Voices from Deep Below (Hoshi o Ou Kodomo)	Success
2011	Abenobashi: extended preorder	Magical Shopping Arcade Abenobashi (Abenobashi Mahō Shōtengai)	Successful funding, but license expired before release
2012	People's License–2	Wolf Children Ame and Yuki (Ōkami Kodomo no Ame to Yuki); Summer Wars (Samā Wōzu); Evangelion: 2.22 You Can [Not] Advance (Evangelion Shin Gekijouban: Ha); Evangelion: 3.33 You Can [Not] Redo (Evangelion Shin Gekijouban: Q)	Success

== See also ==
- XL Media (in Russian)
- Mega-Anime
- Istari comics (in Russian)
- RUSCICO (Russian Cinema Council) (in Russian)
