= Planeta DeAgostini =

Hispano-Italian publisher

Editorial Planeta-DeAgostini, S.A.
- Company type: Sociedad Anónima
- Industry: Publishing
- Headquarters: Barcelona, Spain
- Area served: Spain, Portugal, Argentina, Brazil, Colombia, Chile, Ecuador, Mexico, Uruguay and Venezuela
- Owner: Planeta Corporación, SRL De Agostini
- Website: www.planetadeagostini.es

Editorial Planeta-DeAgostini is a Hispano-Italian publisher and a subsidiary of Grupo Planeta and De Agostini specializing in collectable books, sold periodically in pieces through newsstands (partworks). It has its headquarters in Barcelona.

They distribute comics and manga under the name Planeta DeAgostini Comics. It is a major shareholder in broadcaster Antena 3 de Televisión.

Planeta-DeAgostini operates in Argentina, Brazil, Chile, Colombia, Ecuador, Italy, Japan, Mexico, Portugal, Spain and Uruguay.

Planeta DeAgostini launched Yukiru Sugisaki's Brain Powerd in Spain in 2000.

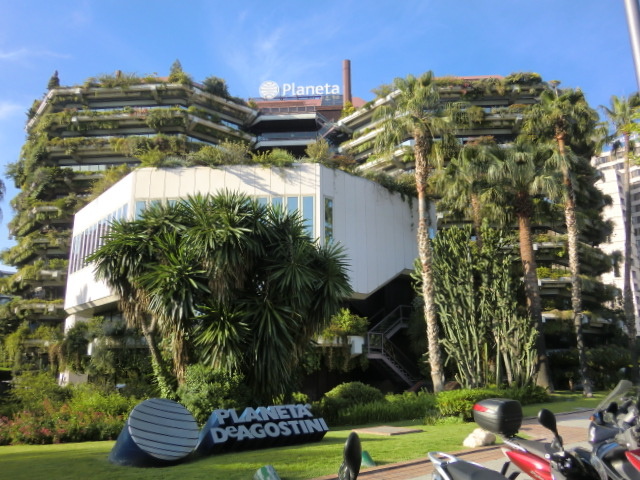
Head office of Planeta DeAgostini

== See also ==
- DeAPlaneta
