= M&C! =

Indonesian publishing company

m&c! Publishing
- M&C! logo
- Parent company: PT Gramedia Pustaka Utama
- Status: Active
- Predecessor: Majalah & Komik (1980-1992); Komik Gramedia Majalah (1992-December 2002)
- Founded: 2003
- Country of origin: Indonesia
- Headquarters location: Central Jakarta
- Distribution: Gramedia
- Publication types: Book; Comic; Novel
- Imprints: Akasha; KOLONI; Clover; Funtastic; Miracle; QANZA
- Owner: Kompas Gramedia GoRP
- Official website: www.mncgramedia.id

m&c! Publishing or better known as m&c! (stands for Magazine & Comics; Indonesian: Majalah & Komik) is a publishing company in Indonesia. The company has its roots on Komik Gramedia Majalah in the 1980s, which often published various comics from foreign publishers. In 2003, m&c! was established as a publishing company and is part of the Retail and Publishing Division of the Kompas Gramedia Group (KGG). m&c! headquartered in the Kompas Gramedia Palmerah building, located in Tanah Abang, Central Jakarta.

Today, m&c! alongside Elex Media Komputindo—which is also part of the KGG—are the two biggest publishers in the comic publishing industry in Indonesia.

== History ==
m&c! has its roots in the 1980s, starting with Komik Majalah which published various comics from foreign publishers. Initially, Komik Majalah only published comics from Europe and Hong Kong. Some titles became popular, including the Nina series from the Netherlands and kung fu-themed comics, Tiger Wong from Hong Kong. During the period of the 1990s, m&c! also began publishing comics originating from Japan, otherwise known as manga.

In its development, m&c! establishing several imprints that are divided specifically for certain sectors. On May 17, 2003, m&c! established imprint under the name of KOLONI, which specifically published local comics from Indonesia. m&c! then formed another imprint named Clover, which was devoted to the publication of novels, funtastic which was established specifically for the publication of children's books, Miracle for nonfiction books, and QANZA for Islamic books.

On March 22, 2019, they launched a new label with more mature-themed manga targeted for older readers, named Akasha.

== Publications ==
As a part of the Kompas-Gramedia Group of book stores, m&c! have issued more than 50 manga, with ratings, from "SU:Semua Umur" or General Viewing, to "18+: 18 Tahun ke Atas" or 18 years old and older only. Manga works that are published by this company include: Shaman King, Full Metal Panic! and Sakura Wars.
