= Dynit =

Italian manga and anime publishing company

- Genre: anime
- Founded: 1995
- Founders: Francesco Di Sanzo, Claudia Cangini, Francesco Bombardini, Paolo Nascetti, Saetti SRL, Federico Colpi
- Headquarters: Granarolo dell'Emilia, Italy
- Key people: Carlo Cavazzoni

Dynit Srl is one of the main Italian manga and anime publishers. Its head office is in the Cadriano frazione in Granarolo dell'Emilia, Province of Bologna.

It was founded in 1995 by Francesco Di Sanzo, Claudia Cangini, Francesco Bombardini, Paolo Nascetti, Saetti Srl and Federico Colpi and its original name was Dynamic Italia Srl. The name was changed following a litigation between Colpi and then-president Francesco Di Sanzo, who later founded Shin Vision. All anime and manga published by Dynit are translated in Italian. Many of their anime have been published in VHS and DVD; also they have been broadcast by the Italian television channels MTV, Rai Due, Disney Channel and Rai 4. Federico Colpi left the company in 2002 after further litigation with the company's new management.

Dynit also distributes the RKO Radio Pictures library on home video in the Italian market under license from Red Film, which owns the distribution rights to the RKO catalog in the country.

== List of anime ==
- A Letter to Momo
- Aika
- Akira
- Alexander
- Alexander The Movie
- Angel Sanctuary
- Ano Hana
- Armitage III
- Armitage III
- Armitage III: Poly Matrix
- Arzak Rhapsody
- Attack on Titan
- Bakemonogatari
- Beck
- Black Rock Shooter
- Blue Submarine No. 6
- Blocker Gundan 4 Machine Blaster
- Boogiepop Phantom
- Boys Be
- Brain Powered
- Casshan
- Charmmy Kitty
- Chi's Sweet Home
- Ceres, Celestial Legend
- City Hunter
- Code Geass: Lelouch of the Rebellion
- Code Geass: Akito the Exiled
- Coppelion
- Cosmowarrior Zero
- Cowboy Bebop
- Cyber City Oedo 808
- Dai-Guard
- Daitarn 3
- Daltanious
- Dance in the Vampire Bund
- Day Break Illusion
- Deadman Wonderland
- Death Note
- Demon City Shinjuku
- Dennou Coil
- Devil Lady
- Diebuster
- Dragon Ball
- Digimon
- Eatman
- Ergo Proxy
- Eureka Seven
- Evangelion: 1.0 You Are (Not) Alone
- Evangelion: 2.0 You Can (Not) Advance
- Evangelion: 3.0 You Can (Not) Redo
- Excel Saga
- Fate/stay night: Unlimited Blade Works
- Fire Force DNA Sights 999.9
- FLCL
- Full Metal Panic!: The Second Raid
- Fullmetal Alchemist
- Fullmetal Alchemist Brotherhood
- Full Moon o Sagashite
- Fushigi Yūgi
- Future Boy Conan
- Gals!
- Gatchaman Crowds
- Garden of Words
- Gear Fighter Dendoh
- Generator Gawl
- Ghost in the Shell
- Ghost in the Shell: Innocence
- Ghost in the Shell 2.0
- Ghost in the Shell: Stand Alone Complex
- Ghost in the Shell: Stand Alone Complex The 2nd GIG
- Ghost in the Shell: Stand Alone Complex Solid State Society
- Ghost in the Shell: Arise
- Gintama (Ep. 1-49)
- Golden Boy
- Groizer X
- Great Teacher Onizuka
- Gunbuster
- Gurren Lagann: Childhood's End
- Gurren Lagann: The Lights in the Sky are Stars
- Hand Maid May
- Hurricane Polymar
- Kaiba
- InuYasha
- InuYasha The Final Act
- Kakurenbo
- Kare Kano
- Kill la Kill
- Last Exile
- Lovely Complex
- Mahoujin Guru Guru
- Mao Dante
- Mawaru Penguindrum
- My Hero Academia
- Nana
- Neon Genesis Evangelion (the company became known to NGE fans for releasing the show uncut and uncensored with great success in Italy, considering its controversial content)
- Neon Genesis Evangelion: Death & Rebirth
- Noein
- Oh My Goddess!
- One Punch Man
- Owarimonogatari
- Owari no Seraph
- Panda kopanda
- Paul no Miracle Daisakusen
- Pet Shop of Horrors
- Ping Pong The Animation
- Platinumhugen Ordian
- Prison School
- Psycho-Pass
- Psycho-Pass 2
- Pretty Cure
- Puella Magi Madoka Magica
- Puella Magi Madoka Magica: The Movie (Beginning, Eternal, Rebellion)
- Ranma ½
- Rurouni Kenshin
- Sakura Mail
- Sailor Moon
- Saiyuki
- Serial Experiments Lain
- Shinkai Densetsu Meremanoid
- Silver Spoon
- Someone's Gaze
- Soul Eater
- Soul Eater Not!
- Soul Taker
- Space Dandy
- Star Blazers: Space Battleship Yamato 2199
- Steins;Gate
- Strange Dawn
- Sugarbunnies
- Sword Art Online
- Sword Art Online Extra Edition
- Sword Art Online II
- Sword of the Stranger
- Tenchi Muyo!
- Tengen Toppa Gurren Lagann
- Terra Formars
- The End of Evangelion
- The Melancholy of Haruhi Suzumiya
- The Vision of Escaflowne
- Toradora!
- Tokyo Ghoul
- Trider G7
- Trigun
- Trigun: Badlands Rumble
- Violence Jack
- Yōkai Ningen Bem
- Wicked City
- Wolf Children
- X/1999
- Zambot 3

== List of manga ==
- Apocalypse Zero
- Bad Company
- Be Free
- Beck
- Black Jack
- Cowboy Bebop
- Deadman
- Devilman
- Emma
- Excel Saga
- Fatal Fury 2
- Fruits Basket
- Gals!
- Genei Musou
- Getter Robot G
- Getter Robot Saga
- Golden Boy
- Goldrake
- Great Teacher Onizuka
- Guru Guru
- Hanakimi
- Hellsing
- Jeeg
- Kare Kano
- Kodocha
- Kugutsu
- Let's Draw Manga
- Love + Dessin
- Mao Dante
- Mazinsaga
- Pretty
- Record of Lodoss War
- Revolutionary Girl Utena
- Saiyuki
- Shadow Hearts
- Shonan Junai Gumi
- Super Doll Rika Chan
- Trigun
- Violence Jack
- Yotsuba&!
