= Bongkoch Publishing =

Thai publisher

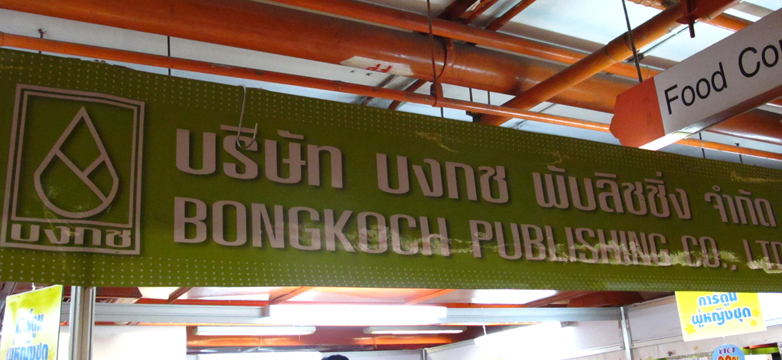
Bongkoch Publishing

Bongkoch Publishing is a Thai publisher based in Thailand. It produced mainly shōjo, romance and fantasy comics. Alongside Vibulkij, Nation, and Siam Inter Comics, it was one of four companies to publish comics in Thailand in the 1990s.

== Gallery ==
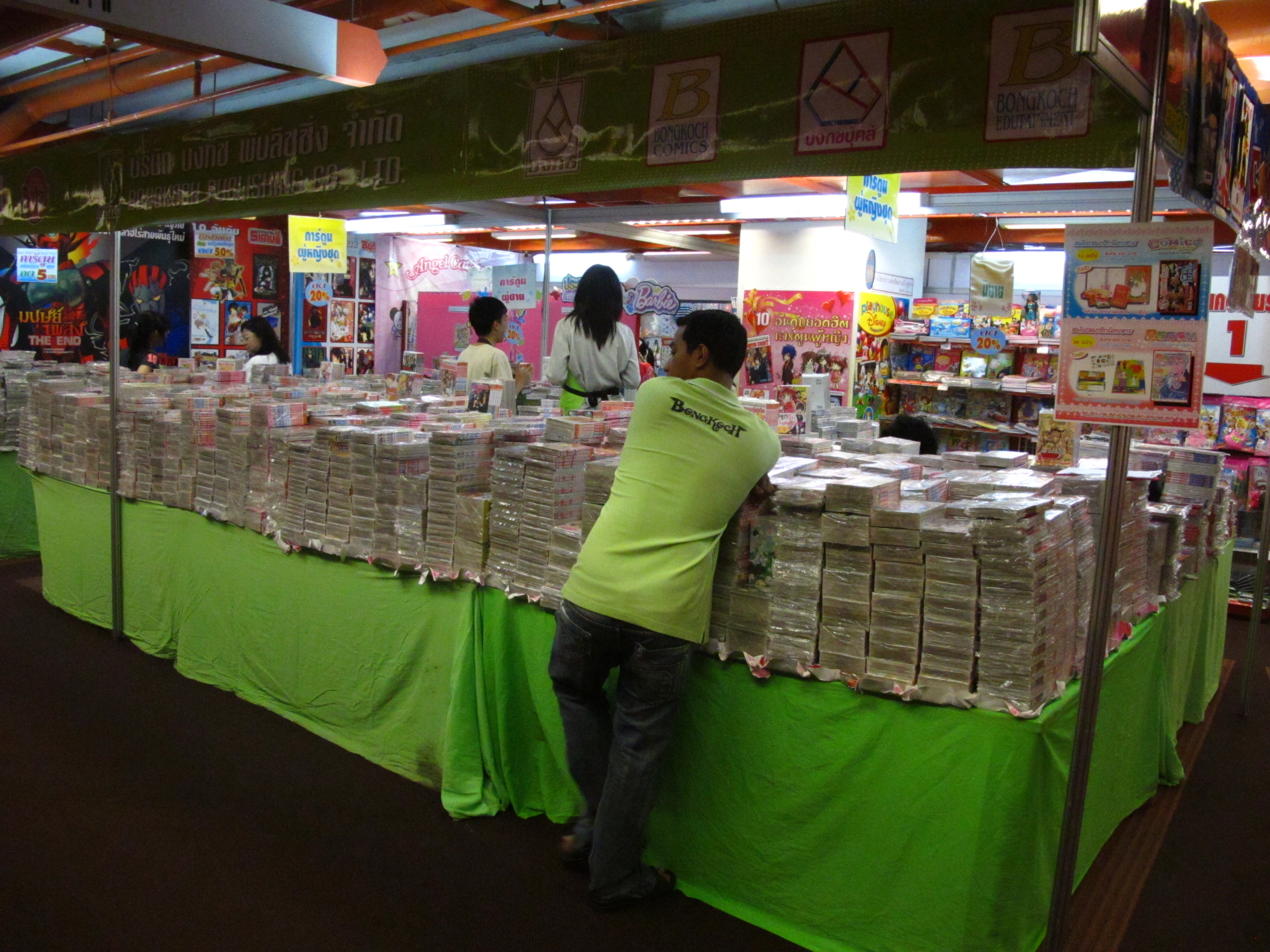
Bongkoch Publishing booth

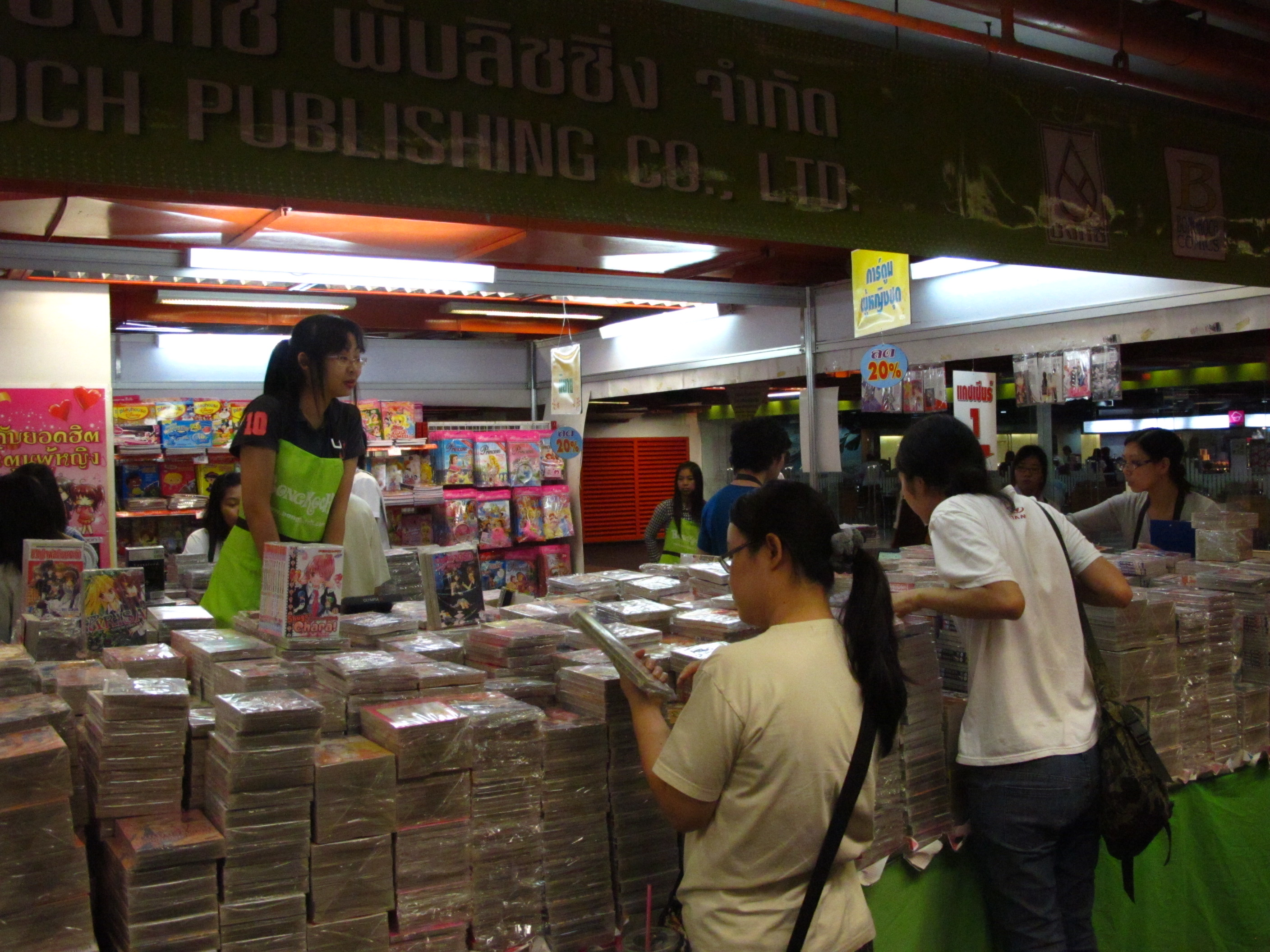
Booth at Queen Sirikit National Convention Center
