= List of dignitaries at the state funeral of Hirohito =

Map showing countries which sent dignitaries to the state funeral of Emperor Shōwa on 24 February 1989.

The state funeral of Hirohito (Emperor Shōwa), the 124th Emperor of Japan, was attended by a significant number of dignitaries from Japan, 163 foreign countries and 28 international institutions. The funeral on 24 February 1989 comprised a series of religious (Shinto) and state ceremonies at the Shinjuku Gyo-en in Tokyo.

== Japan ==
=== Imperial House ===
The late Emperor's descendants:

- The Emperor and Empress, the late Emperor's son and daughter-in-law
  - The Crown Prince, the late Emperor's grandson
  - The Prince Aya, the late Emperor's grandson
  - The Princess Nori, the late Emperor's granddaughter
- The Former Princess Yori and Takamasa Ikeda, the late Emperor's daughter and son-in-law
- The Prince and Princess Hitachi, the late Emperor's son and daughter-in-law
- The Former Princess Suga and Hisanaga Shimazu, the late Emperor's daughter and son-in-law

Other descendants of Emperor Taishō:

- The Princess Takamatsu, the late Emperor's sister-in-law
- The Prince and Princess Mikasa, the late Emperor's brother and sister-in-law
  - Former Princess Yasuko of Mikasa and Tadateru Konoe, the late Emperor's niece and nephew-in-law
  - Prince and Princess Tomohito of Mikasa, the late Emperor's nephew and niece-in-law
  - Former Princess Masako of Mikasa and Masayuki Sen, the late Emperor's niece and nephew-in-law
  - The Prince and Princess Takamado, the late Emperor's nephew and niece-in-law

=== Politicians ===
- Noboru Takeshita, Prime Minister of Japan
- (Japan) Keizō Obuchi, Chief Cabinet Secretary
- (Japan) Kenzaburo Hara, Speaker of the House of Representatives
- (Japan) Yoshihiko Tsuchiya, President of the House of Councillors
- (Japan) Koichi Yaguchi, Chief Justice of the Supreme Court
- (Japan) Hitoshi Motoshima, Mayor of Nagasaki

== Other countries ==
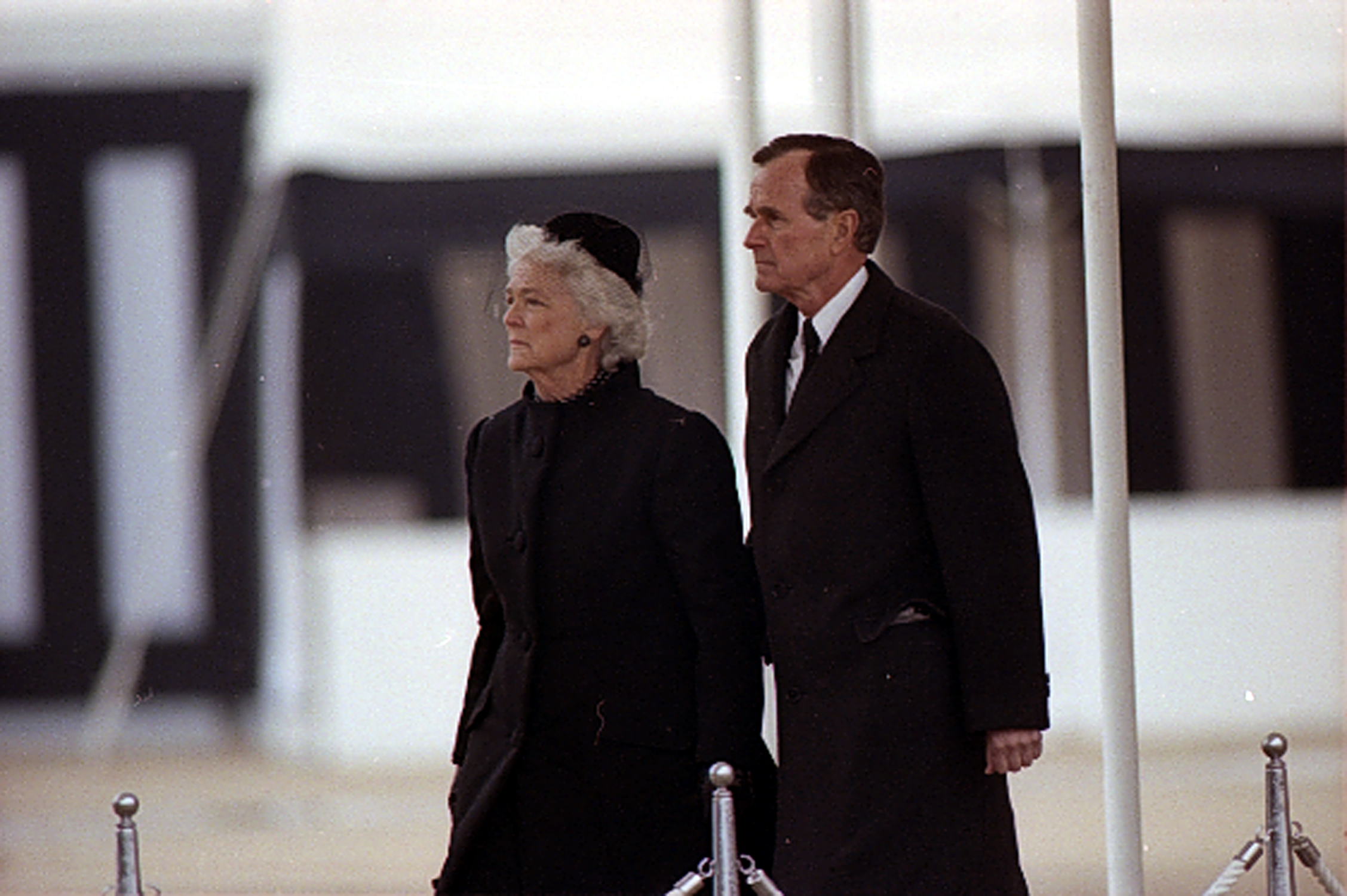
U.S. President George H. W. Bush and First Lady Barbara Bush attended Emperor Shōwa's funeral.

=== Royalty ===
==== Members of reigning royal houses ====
- Sheikh Ali bin Khalifa Al Khalifa (representing the Emir of Bahrain)
- The King and Queen of the Belgians
- The King of Bhutan
- The Sultan of Brunei
- Prince Sufri Bolkiah of Brunei
- Prince Jefri Bolkiah of Brunei
- The Prince Consort of Denmark (representing the Queen of Denmark)
- The King of Jordan
- The King of Lesotho
- The Hereditary Prince and Hereditary Princess of Liechtenstein (representing the Prince of Liechtenstein)
- The Grand Duke and Grand Duchess of Luxembourg
- The Deputy Yang di-Pertuan Agong and Deputy Raja Permaisuri Agong of Malaysia (representing the Yang di-Pertuan Agong of Malaysia)
- The Hereditary Prince of Monaco (representing the Prince of Monaco)
- The Crown Prince of Morocco (representing the King of Morocco)
- Prince Gyanendra of Nepal (representing the King of Nepal)
- The Crown Prince of Norway (representing the King of Norway)
- Sayyid Thuwaini bin Shihab Al Said of Oman (representing the Sultan of Oman)
- Sheikh Ahmed bin Saif Al Thani of Qatar, State Minister for Foreign Affairs of Qatar (representing the Emir of Qatar)
- Prince Nawwaf bin Abdulaziz Al Saud of Saudi Arabia (representing the King of Saudi Arabia)
- The King and Queen of Spain
- The Prime Minister of Swaziland (representing the King of Swaziland)
- The King and Queen of Sweden
- The Crown Prince of Thailand (representing the King of Thailand)
- The King and Queen of Tonga
- Sheikh Mohamed bin Zayed Al Nahyan (representing the President of the United Arab Emirates)
- The Duke of Edinburgh (representing the Queen of the United Kingdom)
- The Malietoa of Western Samoa

==== Members of non-reigning royal houses ====
- Prince Norodom Ranariddh and Princess Norodom Marie of Cambodia (representing Prince Norodom Sihanouk of Cambodia)

=== Heads of state and government ===
- Hussain Muhammad Ershad, President of Bangladesh
- José Sarney, President of Brazil, and First Lady Marly Sarney
- Pierre Buyoya, President of Burundi
- George Vassiliou, President of Cyprus
- Barkat Gourad Hamadou, Prime Minister of Djibouti
- Hosni Mubarak, President of Egypt
- Fikre Selassie Wogderess, Prime Minister of Ethiopia
- Ratu Sir Penaia Ganilau, President of Fiji, and Lady Bale Ganilau
- Mauno Koivisto, President of Finland, and First Lady Tellervo Koivisto
- François Mitterrand, President of France
- Sir Dawda Jawara, President of The Gambia
- Richard von Weizsäcker, President of West Germany
- Jerry Rawlings, Chairman of the Provisional National Defence Council of Ghana
- Christos Sartzetakis, President of Greece, and First Lady Efrosyni Argyriou
- João Bernardo Vieira, President of the Council of State of Guinea-Bissau, and First Lady Isabel Romana Vieira
- José Azcona del Hoyo, President of Honduras, and First Lady Miriam Bocock
- Brunó Ferenc Straub, President of the Presidential Council of Hungary
- Vigdís Finnbogadóttir, President of Iceland
- Ramaswamy Venkataraman, President of India, and First Lady Janaki Venkataraman
- Suharto, President of Indonesia, and First Lady Siti Hartinah
- Patrick Hillery, President of Ireland
- Chaim Herzog, President of Israel
- Francesco Cossiga, President of Italy
- Daniel arap Moi, President of Kenya
- Maumoon Abdul Gayoom, President of the Maldives
- John Haglelgam, President of Micronesia, and First Lady Paula Ori
- Hammer DeRoburt, President of Nauru
- Mamane Oumarou, Prime Minister of Niger
- Ibrahim Babangida, President of Nigeria
- Benazir Bhutto, Prime Minister of Pakistan, and Asif Ali Zardari
- Manuel Solís Palma, Acting President of Panama
- Corazon Aquino, President of the Philippines
- Mário Soares, President of Portugal
- Lee Kuan Yew, Prime Minister of Singapore, and Kwa Geok Choo
- Chatichai Choonhavan, Prime Minister of Thailand
- Gnassingbé Eyadéma, President of Togo
- Hédi Baccouche, Prime Minister of Tunisia
- Turgut Özal, Prime Minister of Turkey, and Semra Özal
- Samson Kisekka, Prime Minister of Uganda
- George H. W. Bush, President of the United States, and First Lady Barbara Bush
- Fred Timakata, President of Vanuatu
- Mobutu Sese Seko, President of Zaire, and First Lady Bobi Ladawa Mobutu
- Kenneth Kaunda, President of Zambia

=== Deputies ===
==== Governors-general ====
- Bill Hayden, Governor-General of Australia, and Dallas Broadfoot
- Jeanne Sauvé, Governor General of Canada, and Maurice Sauvé
- Sir Paul Reeves, Governor-General of New Zealand, and Beverly, Lady Reeves
- Sir Kingsford Dibela, Governor-General of Papua New Guinea, and Lady Dibela
- Sir George Lepping, Governor-General of Solomon Islands, and Margaret, Lady Lepping
- Sir Tupua Leupena, Governor-General of Tuvalu

==== Other deputies to heads of state ====
- Víctor Hipólito Martínez, Vice President of Argentina
- Julio Garrett, Vice President of Bolivia
- Petar Tanchev, First Vice President of the State Council of Bulgaria
- Carlos Morales Troncoso, Vice President of the Dominican Republic, and Luisa Alba de Morales
- Manfred Gerlach, Vice Chairman of the Council of State of East Germany
- Hamilton Green, First Vice President and Prime Minister of Guyana
- Taha Muhie-eldin Marouf, Vice President of Iraq
- Teatao Teannaki, Vice President of Kiribati
- Kang Young Hoon, Prime Minister of South Korea
- Harry Moniba, Vice President of Liberia
- Kazimierz Barcikowski, Vice President of the Council of State of Poland
- Manea Mănescu, Vice President of the State Council of Romania
- Anatoly Lukyanov, Deputy Chairman of the Supreme Soviet of the Soviet Union
- Idris Al Banna, Vice President of the Supreme Council of Sudan
- Joseph Warioba, First Vice President and Prime Minister of Tanzania
- Le Quang Dao, Vice President of the State Council and Chairman of the National Assembly of Vietnam
- Stane Dolanc, Vice President of the Presidency of Yugoslavia
- Simon Muzenda, Vice President of Zimbabwe

==== Deputies to heads of government ====
- Pavol Hrivnák, First Deputy Prime Minister of Czechoslovakia
- José Ramón Fernández, Vice President of the Council of Ministers of Cuba
- Georges Rawiri, First Deputy Prime Minister of Gabon
- Hans-Dietrich Genscher, Vice Chancellor and Federal Minister of Foreign Affairs of West Germany
- Phoun Sipaseuth, Deputy Prime Minister and Minister of Foreign Affairs of Laos
- Eurico de Melo, Deputy Prime Minister and Minister of Defence of Portugal
- Salim Yasin, Deputy Prime Minister of Syria

=== Foreign ministers ===
- Afonso Van-Dúnem, Minister of External Relations of Angola (representing the President of Angola)
- Alois Mock, Minister of Foreign Affairs of Austria (representing the President of Austria)
- Leo Tindemans, Minister of External Relations of Belgium
- Guy Landry Hazoume, Minister of Foreign Affairs of Benin
- Dawa Tsering, Minister of Foreign Affairs of Bhutan
- Gaositwe Chiepe, Minister of Foreign Affairs of Botswana (representing the President of Botswana)
- Abreu Sodré, Minister of External Relations of Brazil
- Domba Jean-Marc Palm, Minister of External Relations of Burkina Faso
- Silvino Manuel da Luz, Minister of Foreign Affairs of Cape Verde (representing the President of Cape Verde)
- Michel Gbezera Bria, Minister of Foreign Affairs of the Central African Republic (representing the President of the Central African Republic)
- Hernán Felipe Errázuriz, Minister of Foreign Affairs of Chile (representing the President of Chile)
- Qian Qichen, Minister of Foreign Affairs of the People's Republic of China (representing the President of the People's Republic of China)
- Said Kafe, Ministers of Foreign Affairs of the Comoros
- Antoine Ndinga Oba, Minister of Foreign Affairs of the People's Republic of the Congo (representing the President of the People's Republic of the Congo)
- Rodrigo Madrigal Nieto, Minister of Foreign Affairs of Costa Rica (representing the President of Costa Rica)
- Ricardo Acevedo Peralta, Minister of Foreign Affairs of El Salvador (representing the President of El Salvador)
- Roland Dumas, Minister of Foreign Affairs of France
- Omar Sey, Minister of External Affairs of The Gambia
- Jean Traoré, Minister of Foreign Affairs of Guinea (representing the President of Guinea)
- Carlos López Contreras, Secretary of Foreign Affairs of Honduras
- P. V. Narasimha Rao, Minister of External Affairs of India
- Robert Ouko, Minister of Foreign Affairs of Kenya
- Saud Al-Osaimi, Minister of State for Foreign Affairs of Kuwait (representing the Emir of Kuwait)
- Jean Bemananjara, Minister of Foreign Affairs of Madagascar (representing the President of Madagascar)
- Abu Hassan Omar, Minister of Foreign Affairs of Malaysia
- Fathulla Jameel, Minister of Foreign Affairs of the Maldives
- Ċensu Tabone, Minister of Foreign Affairs of Malta
- Tom Kijiner, Minister of Foreign Affairs of the Marshall Islands (representing the President of the Marshall Islands)
- Mohamed Sidina Ould Sidiya, Minister of Foreign Affairs and Cooperation of Mauritania (representing the President of Mauritania)
- Abdellatif Filali, Minister of Foreign Affairs of Morocco
- Hans van den Broek, Minister of Foreign Affairs of the Netherlands
- Russell Marshall, Minister of Foreign Affairs of New Zealand
- Ike Nwachukwu, Minister of External Affairs of Nigeria
- Thorvald Stoltenberg, Minister of Foreign Affairs of Norway
- Sahabzada Yaqub Khan, Minister of Foreign Affairs of Pakistan
- Jorge Eduardo Ritter, Minister of Foreign Affairs of Panama
- Luis María Argaña, Minister of External Affairs of Paraguay (representing the President of Paraguay)
- Raul Manglapus, Secretary of Foreign Affairs of the Philippines
- Ibrahima Fall, Minister of Foreign Affairs of Senegal (representing the President of Senegal)
- Abdul Karim Koroma, Minister of Foreign Affairs of Sierra Leone (representing the President of Sierra Leone)
- René Felber, head of the Federal Department of Foreign Affairs of Switzerland
- Sir Geoffrey Howe, Secretary of State for Foreign and Commonwealth Affairs of the United Kingdom
- James Baker, United States Secretary of State
- Luis Barrios Tassano, Minister of Foreign Affairs of Uruguay (representing the President of Uruguay)
- Enrique Tejera París, Minister of Foreign Affairs of Venezuela (representing the President of Venezuela)

=== Diplomats ===
This section only includes diplomats who headed the delegations of their respective countries.

- Justin Papajorgji, Ambassador of Albania to Japan
- Atlay Morales, Belizean Ambassador to Mexico
- Issa Abbas Ali, Ambassador of Chad to Japan
- Cándido Oyono Ela Eyang, Chargé d'affaires of Equatorial Guinea to Japan
- Samir Khoury, Ambassador of Lebanon to Japan
- Taher Ali Marwan, Chargé d'affaires of Libya to Japan
- Manlio Cadelo, Honorary Consul-General of San Marino in Tokyo
- Alexander Waldemar Kuhn, Consul-General of South Africa in Tokyo
- Cyrill Ramkisor, Surinamese Ambassador to the Netherlands
- Chang Pao-shu, Chairman of the Association of East Asian Relations of Taiwan
- Premchand J. Dass, Trinidadian High Commissioner to India
- Mohamed Abdul Koddos Alwazir, Ambassador of North Yemen to Japan

=== Other representatives ===
- Rabah Bitat, Speaker of the National People's Assembly of Algeria (representing the President of Algeria)
- Romain Vilon Guézo, President of the Permanent Committee of the National Revolutionary Assembly of Benin (representing the President of Benin)
- Seigo Tsuzuki, Minister of Health of Brazil
- Bukarii Mahamadu Gabriel of Burkina Faso (representing the President of Burkina Faso)
- U Pe Thein, Minister for Health and Education of Burma (representing the Chairman of the State Law and Order Restoration Council of Burma)
  - U Tha Tun, Attorney-General of Burma
- Lawrence Fonka Shang, President of the National Assembly of Cameroon (representing the President of Cameroon)
- John Crosbie, Minister of International Trade of Canada
- Carolina Isakson Proctor, First Lady of Colombia (representing the President of Colombia)
- Salim Ben Ali, former Prime Minister of the Comoros and President of Grande Comore (representing the President of the Comoros)
- Fernando Naranjo, Minister of Finance and Public Treasury of Costa Rica
- Arnaldo Torriente Gutiérrez, member of the National Assembly of People's Power (parliament) of Cuba
- Takis Nemitsas, Minister of Commerce and Industry of Cyprus
- Palle Simonsen, Minister of Finance of Denmark
- Gil Barragán, President of the Supreme Court of Ecuador (representing the President of Ecuador)
- Ali Bongo, son and personal representative of President Omar Bongo of Gabon
- Tsatsu Tsikata, Minister of State of Ghana
- Claudia Arenas Bianchi, Secretary of Public Relations of the Presidency of Guatemala (representing the President of Guatemala)
- Manuel dos Santos, Minister of Trade and Tourism of Guinea-Bissau
- Antony Virginie Saint-Pierre, Minister of Information and Coordination of Haiti (representing the President of Haiti)
- Cardinal Silvio Oddi of the Holy See (representing the Pope)
- Gábor Nagy, Deputy Minister of Foreign Affairs of Hungary
- Mostafa Mir-Salim, top advisor to President Ali Khamenei of Iran
  - Hossein Saffar Harandi, member of the Islamic Consultative Assembly (parliament) and chairman of the Agriculture Commission of the Islamic Consultative Assembly of Iran
- Camille Alliali, Minister of State of Ivory Coast (representing the President of Ivory Coast)
- Robert Goebbels, Secretary of State for Foreign Affairs of Luxembourg
- Maxwell Pashane, Minister without Portfolio of Malawi (representing the President of Malawi)
- Oumar Ba, Minister of Justice of Mali (representing the President of Mali)
- Madan Dulloo, Minister of Agriculture, Fisheries and Natural Resources of Mauritius
- Cecilia Occelli, First Lady of Mexico (representing the President of Mexico)
- Lodongiyn Rinchin, Chairman of the People's Great Khural of Mongolia (representing the Chairman of the Presidium of the People's Great Khural of Mongolia)
- Jacinto Veloso, Minister of Cooperation of Mozambique (representing the President of Mozambique)
- William Hüpper Argüello, Minister of Finance of Nicaragua (representing the President of Nicaragua)
- Nabil Shaath, political adviser for Palestinian leader Yasser Arafat
- Felipe Valdivieso Belaúnde, Vice Minister and Secretary General at the Ministry of External Relations of Peru (representing the President of Peru)
- Jean-Marie Mugemana, Minister of the Interior and Community Development of Rwanda (representing the President of Rwanda)
- Allan C. Cruickshank, Minister of Communications and Works of Saint Vincent and the Grenadines (Note: Attending on behalf of the Organisation of Eastern Caribbean States and its member states.)
- Alberto Ferreira Chong, Secretary-General of the Ministry of Foreign Affairs of São Tomé and Príncipe (representing the President of São Tomé and Príncipe)
- Jacques Hodoul, Minister of National Development of Seychelles (representing the President of Seychelles)
- Mohamed Sheikh Osman, Minister of the Presidency for Economic Affairs of Somalia (representing the President of Somalia)
- Virgilio Zapatero, Minister of Relations with the Cortes and Government Secretariat of Spain
- J. R. Jayewardene, former President of Sri Lanka (representing the President of Sri Lanka)
- Anglo B. Beda, Chairman of the Southern Sudan Council of Sudan
- Reginald Dhladhla, Minister of Justice of Swaziland
- Kjell-Olof Feldt, Minister of Finance of Sweden
- Barry Moussa Barque, Minister of Planning and Mines of Togo
- Baron Vaea, Minister of Labour, Commerce and Industries of Tonga (Note: Attending on behalf of the South Pacific Forum.)
- Enele Sopoaga, Assistant Secretary for Foreign Affairs of Tuvalu
- Patu Afaese, Minister of Education of Western Samoa
- Saleh Abdullah Muthanna, Minister of Transport and Communications of South Yemen (representing the Chairman of the Presidium of Supreme People's Council of South Yemen)
- Panji Kaunda, son of President Kenneth Kaunda of Zambia

== International organizations ==
- Masao Fujioka, President of the Asian Development Bank
- Jean-Claude Paye, Secretary-General of the OECD
- Michel Camdessus, managing director of the International Monetary Fund
- William Henry Draper III, Administrator of the United Nations Development Programme
- Domingo Siazon Jr., Director-General of the United Nations Industrial Development Organization
- Javier Pérez de Cuéllar, United Nations Secretary-General, and Marcela Pérez de Cuéllar
- Hiroshi Nakajima, Director-General of the World Health Organization
- Frans Andriessen, Vice-President of the Commission of the European Communities, and Catherine Andriessen

== Absences ==
The Empress Dowager Nagako (Empress Kōjun), the late Emperor's widow, was unable to attend the ceremonies due to a back and leg illness.
