= Death and state funeral of Hirohito =

1989 funeral of the Emperor of Japan

Death and state funeral of Emperor Shōwa
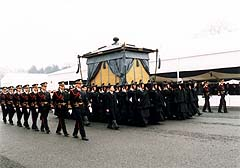
- The state funeral procession of Emperor Shōwa
- Date: 7 January 1989, at 06:33 (JST) (death); 24 February 1989 (state funeral and interment)
- Location: Fukiage Palace, Chiyoda, Tokyo (death); Shinjuku Gyo-en, Shinjuku and Shibuya, Tokyo (funeral); Musashi Imperial Graveyard, Hachiōji, Tokyo (resting place)
- Budget: ¥10 billion
- Participants: List of dignitaries at the state funeral

Hirohito, Emperor of Japan, died aged 87 on 7 January 1989 at the Fukiage Palace in Chiyoda, Tokyo, of complications from intestinal cancer. Hirohito was the longest-reigning emperor in Japanese history and was among the last surviving World War II-era heads of state. He was succeeded on the Chrysanthemum Throne by his eldest son, Akihito.

Hirohito's state funeral was held on 24 February at Shinjuku Gyo-en, when he was buried near his parents, Emperor Taishō and Empress Teimei, at the Musashi Imperial Graveyard in Hachiōji, Tokyo.

== Background ==
On 22 September 1987, Hirohito underwent surgery on his pancreas after having digestive problems for several months. Doctors discovered that he had duodenal cancer, but had refused to disclose this condition to the Emperor because it was considered a cultural taboo. He appeared to be making a full recovery for several months after the surgery. About a year later, however, on 19 September 1988, he vomited blood and collapsed, and his health worsened over the next several months as he suffered from continuous internal bleeding. After his condition continued to deteriorate, officials from the government and Imperial Household Agency began making preparations for the future announcement of his death and planning for his funeral.

By 6 January 1989, Hirohito was also suffering from kidney failure and had been administered with over 67 pints of blood.

== Death and aftermath ==
On 7 January, at 05:40 (JST), members of the imperial family gathered at the Tokyo Imperial Palace, including Crown Prince Akihito and his wife, Crown Princess Michiko, after chief court physician Akira Takagi rushed in to attend to the Emperor; he died less than an hour later, at 6:33 am. His death was announced to the public at 7:55 am during a press conference by the Grand Steward of Japan's Imperial Household Agency, Shōichi Fujimori, who also publicly disclosed his cancer for the first time. Hirohito was survived by his wife, five children, ten grandchildren and one great-grandchild.

Hirohito's death ended the Shōwa era. He was succeeded by his son, Akihito, who was invested with the imperial regalia on the day of his accession. The Heisei era corresponding to Akihito's reign began the following day (8 January 1989). The new Emperor's formal enthronement ceremony was held in Tokyo on 12 November 1990.

The deceased Emperor was initially referred to as Taikō Tennō (大行天皇, "Departed Emperor"). His posthumous name, Shōwa Tennō (昭和天皇), was officially determined on 13 January and formally released on 31 January by Prime Minister Noboru Takeshita.

== State funeral ==
=== Planning ===
After the death of the Emperor, a black ribbon was hung above the Japanese flag as a symbol of mourning.

Emperor Shōwa's state funeral was held on 24 February 1989. By convention, an imperial funeral was to be held within forty to fifty days after the Emperor's death, allowing time for numerous ceremonies leading up to the funeral. Unlike that of his predecessor, although formal the funeral was not conducted in a strictly Shinto manner. The ceremony was carefully designed as a showcase for the peaceful, affluent society into which Japan had developed during the Shōwa era.

Unlike Emperor Taishō's state funeral 62 years earlier, there was no ceremonious parade of officials dressed in military uniforms, and there were far fewer of the Shinto rituals used at that time to glorify the Emperor as a near-deity. These changes were meant to highlight that Emperor Shōwa's funeral would be the first of an emperor under the post-war Constitution. It was also the first imperial funeral to be held in daylight.

To mark the funeral, the government pardoned 30,000 people convicted of minor criminal offenses. The pardons also allowed an additional 11 million people to recover such civil rights as the right to vote and run for public office, which they had lost as a punishment for offenses.

Emperor Shōwa's body lay in three coffins; some personal items such as books and stationery were also placed in them.

=== Procession from the Imperial Palace ===
At 7:30 a.m. on the day of the funeral, Emperor Akihito conducted a private farewell ceremony for his father at the Imperial Palace.

At 9:35 a.m., a black motor hearse carrying the body of Emperor Shōwa left the Imperial Palace for the two-mile-long drive to the Shinjuku Gyoen Garden, where the Shinto and state ceremonies were held. The hearse was accompanied by traditional music played on the shō, a Japanese free reed aerophone; the crowd was largely silent as the hearse bearing the Emperor's coffin drove over a stone bridge and out through the Imperial Palace gates. A brass band played a dirge composed for the funeral of Emperor Shōwa's great-grandmother in the late 19th century, and cannon shots were fired in accompaniment.

The motor hearse was accompanied by a procession of sixty cars. The route of the cortege through Tokyo was lined by an estimated 800,000 spectators and 32,000 special police, who had been mobilized to guard against potential terrorist attacks.

The path of the funeral procession passed the National Diet (parliament) and the National Stadium, where the Emperor opened the 1964 Summer Olympics. The forty-minute procession, accompanied by a brass band, ended when it pulled into the Shinjuku Gyo-en garden, until 1949 reserved for the use of the Imperial family and now one of Tokyo's most popular parks.

=== Ceremonies at Shinjuku Gyo-en ===
The funeral ceremonies at Shinjuku Gyo-en were conducted in a Sojoden, a specially constructed funeral hall. The funeral hall was constructed of Japanese cypress and held together with bamboo nails, in keeping with ancient imperial tradition. Official guests were seated in two white tents located in front of the funeral hall. Because of the low temperatures, many guests used chemical hand-warmers and wool blankets to keep warm as the three-hour Shinto and state ceremonies progressed.

==== Palanquin procession ====
Emperor Shōwa's coffin was transferred into a palanquin made of cypress wood painted with black lacquer. Attendants wearing sokutai and bearing white and yellow banners, shields and signs of the sun and moon, led a 225-member procession as musicians played traditional court music (gagaku). Behind them were gray-robed attendants carrying two sacred sakaki trees, draped with cloth streamers and ceremonial boxes of food and silk cloths to be offered to the spirit of the deceased emperor.

In a nine-minute procession, 51 members of the Imperial Household Agency, clad in traditional gray Shinto clothing, carried the 1.5 ton Sokaren (Imperial Palanquin) containing Emperor Shōwa's three-layered coffin into the funeral hall, as they walked up the aisle between the white tents where guests were seated. Behind the coffin walked a chamberlain dressed in white, who carried a platter with a pair of white shoes, as it is traditionally held that the deceased emperor would wear them to heaven. Emperor Akihito and Empress Michiko, carrying their own large umbrellas, followed the palanquin with other family members.

The procession passed through a small wooden torii gate, the Shinto symbol marking the entrance to sacred space, and filed into the Sojoden.

==== Shinto and state ceremonies ====
The events in the Sojoden were divided into a religious Shinto ceremony (葬場殿の儀, Sōjōden no Gi), followed by a state ceremony (大喪の礼, Taisō no Rei).

When the procession entered the funeral hall, the Shinto portion of the funeral began and a black curtain partition was drawn closed. It opened to reveal a centuries-old ceremony. To the accompaniment of chanting, officials approached the altar of the Emperor, holding aloft wooden trays of sea bream, wild birds, kelp, seaweed, mountain potatoes, melons and other delicacies. The foods, as well as silk cloths, were offered to the spirit of the deceased emperor.

The chief of the ceremony, a childhood classmate and attendant of Hirohito's, then delivered an address, followed by Emperor Akihito.

Shortly before noon, the black curtain closed, marking the end of the Shinto portion of the funeral, and Chief Cabinet Secretary Keizō Obuchi opened the state funeral ceremony. A minute of silence was observed throughout the country. Prime Minister Noboru Takeshita delivered a short eulogy, in which he said that the Shōwa era would be remembered for its eventful and tumultuous times, including World War II and the eventual reconstruction of Japan. Speaker of the House of Representatives Kenzaburo Hara, President of the House of Councillors Yoshihiko Tsuchiya and Chief Justice of the Supreme Court Koichi Yaguchi also delivered short eulogies.

Foreign dignitaries participated in a procession near the altar to pay their respects.

=== Interment at the Imperial Graveyard ===
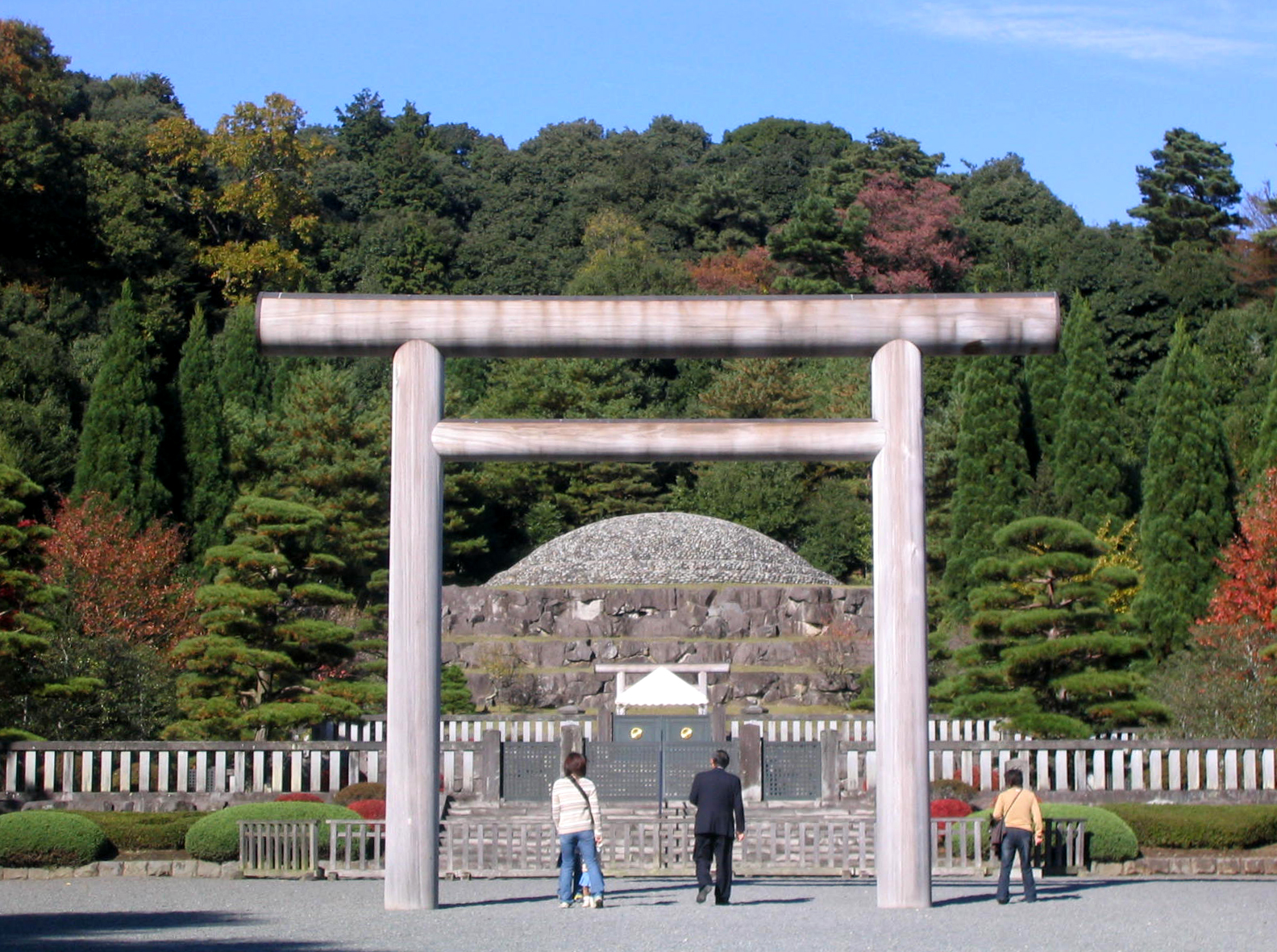
Emperor Shōwa's tomb in the Musashi Imperial Graveyard, Hachiōji, Tokyo

Following the state ceremony, Emperor Shōwa's coffin was taken to the Musashi Imperial Graveyard in Hachiōji for burial. At Emperor Taishō's funeral in 1927, the trip to the Musashi Imperial Graveyard was carried out as a three-hour procession. The trip for Emperor Shōwa's coffin was made by motor hearse and cut to forty minutes. Several hours of ceremonies followed there, until the interment took place at nightfall, the traditional time to bury emperors.

== Funeral dignitaries ==
Countries that sent representatives

An estimated 200,000 people lined the site of the funeral procession – far fewer than the 860,000 that officials had projected. The funeral itself was attended by roughly 10,000 official guests, including foreign heads of state and representatives from 163 countries and 27 international institutions. This required placing Tokyo under an unprecedented blanket of security. Because of security concerns and threats from Japanese left-wing extremists to disrupt the funeral, authorities decided to scrap many of the traditional events that normally accompany funerals for Japanese monarchs. Officials also overrode protocol to give United States President George H. W. Bush a front-row seat, even though tradition would have placed him toward the back because of his short time in office. Bush, who arrived in Tokyo on the day before the funeral, attended the funeral on 24 February and departed for China the next day.

Japanese officials said it was the biggest funeral in modern Japanese history, and the unprecedented turnout of world leaders was recognition of Japan's emergence as an economic superpower. Prime Minister Noboru Takeshita held meetings with roughly forty visiting world leaders, in what was described as an act of "funeral diplomacy".

== Responses ==
=== Domestic ===
External videos
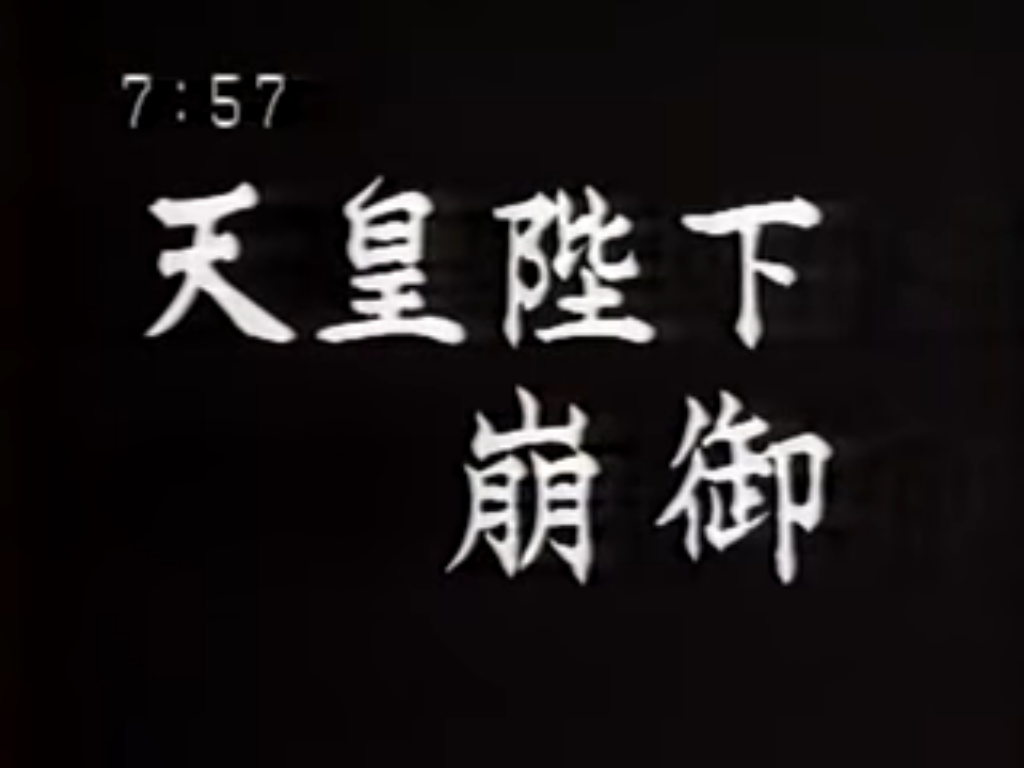
- Announcement of the death of the Emperor on NHK television (in Japanese)

The government observed a mourning period of six days as flags flew at half-mast or were decorated with black ribbons. With virtually all television stations having suspended normal schedules, major Japanese video rental stores saw a surge in customers. The stock market was shut down on the day of the funeral.

Some Japanese, including a small Christian community, constitutional scholars and opposition politicians, denounced the funeral ceremonies and the Shinto-based portion of the funeral as a return to past imperial exaltation, arguing that the inclusion of Shinto rites violated Japan's post-war separation of state and religion. This separation had been especially important in Japan because the Shinto faith was used as a religious basis for the ultra-nationalism and militaristic expansion of wartime Japan. Some opposition party delegates to the funeral boycotted that part of the ceremony. The government's sanctioning of the funeral was met with opposition from Japanese Communist Party and Japan Socialist Party members of the National Diet.

Some anti-monarchy groups staged small protests on the day of the funeral, with eight hundred in Tokyo calling on the government to apologize for war crimes committed in the Emperor's name. Roughly three thousand people also protested in Kyoto.

During the funeral procession in Tokyo, a man stepped into the street as the cortege approached. He was quickly apprehended by police who hustled him away. At 1:55 pm, half an hour before the hearse carrying the late emperor's casket passed by, policemen patrolling the highway leading to the Musashi Imperial Graveyard heard an explosion and found debris scattered along the highway. They quickly cleared away the rubble, and the hearse passed without incident. In total, the police also arrested four people, including two for trying to disrupt the procession.

=== International ===
Many world leaders conveyed their condolences, and some states announced a period of mourning. In France, an international conference on chemical weapons was preceded by a minute of silence as a mark of respect. The United Nations General Assembly also observed a minute of silence, as is customary following the deaths of state leaders.

Although President Roh Tae-woo of South Korea issued a statement expressing condolences, a government official added, "We reserve further comment, considering the unhappy past and the current Korea–Japan relationship." Many South Koreans called on the Japanese government to issue an official apology for the Japanese colonial rule of Korea. In Taiwan, the United Evening News said it was "an irony that while Hirohito apologized to the United States and Europe for the war, he did not direct a single word to China to show his sorrow."

Many viewed the burial of the Emperor, the last remaining major leader during World War II, as the nation's final break with a militaristic past that plunged much of Asia into war in the 1930s. Many Allied veterans of World War II regarded him as a war criminal and called upon their countries to boycott the funeral. Nevertheless, of the 166 foreign states invited to send representatives, all but three accepted.

== See also ==
- Chrysanthemum taboo
