= Shinji Ogawa =

Japanese actor, voice actor and narrator (born 1941)

- 小川真司
- Born: Haruhiko Ogawa; February 19, 1941; Setagaya, Tokyo, Japan
- Died: March 7, 2015 (aged 74); Tokyo, Japan
- Occupations: Actor; voice actor; narrator
- Agent: Herringbone
- Height: 165 cm (5 ft 5 in)
- Children: Gen Ogawa

Shinji Ogawa (小川真司, Ogawa Shinji; born February 19, 1941 – March 7, 2015) was a Japanese actor, voice actor and narrator from Setagaya, Tokyo. He was affiliated with the Herringbone agency.

He was best known as the dubover artist for Michael Douglas and Timothy Dalton, and for voicing Hyō in Fist of the North Star.

== Filmography ==
=== Television animation ===
1970s

- The Rose of Versailles (1979) (Bard)

1980s

- Fist of the North Star (1984) (Hyoh)
- Dragon Ball (1987) (Chin Taiken)
- Saint Seiya (1986) (Shido's father)
- Legend of the Century's End Savior: Fist of the North Star 2 (1987) (Hyō)
- Transformers: Super-God Masterforce (1988) (Dr. Lordan) (ep. 21)
- Mobile Police Patlabor (1989) (Chief Fukushima)

1990s

- Cowboy Bebop (1998) (Gordon) (ep. 3)
- Reign: The Conqueror (1999) (Narrator, Pythagoras)

2000s

- Glass Fleet (2006) (Gawain)
- Witchblade (2006) (Tatsuoki Furumizu)
- Nodame Cantabile (2007) (Maestro Franz von Stresemann)
- Golgo 13 (2008) (Yanagida) (ep. 33)
- Eden of the East (2009) (Hajime Hiura)

2010s

- Yu-Gi-Oh! Zexal (2012) (Dr. Faker)
- Space Battleship Yamato 2199 (2013) (Heikurō Tōdō)
- Aldnoah.Zero (2014) (Rayregalia Vers Rayvers)
- Futsū no Joshikōsei ga Locodol Yattemita (2014)
- Ping Pong (2014) (Ryū Kazama)
- Space Dandy (2014) (Idea) (ep. 11)
- Aldnoah.Zero 2 (2015) (Rayregalia Vers Rayvers)

=== Original video animation (OVA) ===
- Black Magic (1987) (Lt. Commander Arthur)
- Starship Troopers (1988) (Emilio Rico)
- Ninja Gaiden (1991) (Professor Bucky Wise, Narrator)
- Dragon Ball Z Side Story: Plan to Eradicate the Saiyans (1993) (Doctor Raichi)
- Night Warriors: Darkstalkers' Revenge (1997) (Pyron)
- Blue Submarine No. 6 (1998) (Nobo)
- Mobile Suit Gundam Unicorn (2010) (Ronan Marcenas)
- Dareka no Manazashi (2013) (father, Kouji Okamura)

=== Theatrical animation ===
- Patlabor: The Movie (1989) (Chief Fukushima)
- Roujin Z (1991) (Terada)
- Ghost in the Shell (1995) (Diplomat)
- Detective Conan: The Private Eyes' Requiem (2006) (Detective Toyama)
- Junod (2010) (Douglas MacArthur)
- Berserk: Golden Age Arc III (2013) (Void)

=== Video games ===
- Ghost in the Shell (1997) (Batō)
- Muramasa: The Demon Blade (2009) (Muramasa)
- Call of Duty: Modern Warfare 3 (2011) (U.S. President) (Japanese dub)
- Anarchy Reigns (2012) (Maximillian Caxton)
- Dragon's Dogma: Dark Arisen (2013) (The Dragon)

unknown date

- Final Fantasy XV (Iedolas Aldercapt) (first voice)
- James Bond 007: Nightfire (Raphael Drake) (Japanese dub)
- Langrisser I & II (Wolkov)
- Meitantei Evangelion (Hideaki Katsuragi)
- Monster Kingdom: Jewel Summoner (Razuni)

=== Film ===
- Blue Christmas (1978) (Nakamoto)

=== Television dramas ===
- Mito Kōmon (1970–1979) (Kazuma, Tasuke, Takichi, etc.)
- Ōoka Echizen (1971, 1974) (Kyutarō, Shichinosuke)
- Edo o Kiru (1977) (Ninzaburō)
- Castle of Sand (1977)
- Fumō Chitai (1979) (Itokawa)
- Tokugawa Yoshinobu (1998) (Hashimoto Saneyana)

=== Tokusatsu ===
- Captain Ultra (1967) (Juris (Actor))
- Emergency Orders 10-4 10-10 (1972) (Magician Albert (Actor by: John Crampton) (ep. 5))
- Enban Senso Bankid (1976) (Voice of Emujin Captain (ep. 4))
- Kaizoku Sentai Gokaiger (2011) (Voice of Emperor Ackdos Gill (eps. 37, 41 – 44, 46, 49 – 51))
- Kaizoku Sentai Gokaiger vs. Space Sheriff Gavan: The Movie (2012) (Emperor Ackdos Gill)
- Kamen Rider × Super Sentai: Super Hero Taisen (2012) (Emperor Ackdos Gill)

=== Drama CDs ===
- Canon of Sherlock Holmes (Sherlock Holmes)

=== Dubbing roles ===
==== Live-action ====
- Michael Douglas
  - Fatal Attraction (1990 Fuji TV edition) (Dan Gallagher)
  - Wall Street (1991 Fuji TV edition) (Gordon Gekko)
  - Black Rain (1996 Fuji TV edition) (Nick Conklin)
  - The War of the Roses (Oliver Rose)
  - Basic Instinct (Nick Curran)
  - Shining Through (Ed Leland)
  - Falling Down (1997 TV Asahi edition) (William "D-Fens" Foster)
  - Disclosure (Tom Sanders)
  - The American President (President Andrew Shepherd)
  - The Ghost and the Darkness (Charles Remington)
  - The Game (Nicholas Van Orton)
  - A Perfect Murder (Steven Taylor)
  - Traffic (Robert Wakefield)
  - Wonder Boys (Prof. Grady Tripp)
  - Don't Say a Word (Dr. Nathan R. Conrad)
  - One Night at McCool's (Mr. Burmeister)
  - The Sentinel (Pete Garrison)
  - King of California (Charlie)
  - Haywire (Koblenz)
  - Last Vegas (Billy Gherson)
- Dustin Hoffman
  - American Buffalo (Walt 'Teach' Teacher)
  - Sleepers (1999 Fuji TV edition) (Danny Snyder)
  - Mad City (Max Brackett)
  - Wag the Dog (Stanley Motss)
  - Runaway Jury (Wendell Rohr)
  - Lemony Snicket's A Series of Unfortunate Events (The Critic)
  - Meet the Fockers (Bernie Focker)
  - Last Chance Harvey (Harvey Shine)
  - Little Fockers (Bernie Focker)
- Michael Caine
  - Miss Congeniality (Victor Melling)
  - Batman Begins (Alfred Pennyworth)
  - The Dark Knight (Alfred Pennyworth)
  - Inception (Prof. Stephen Miles)
  - The Dark Knight Rises (Alfred Pennyworth)
  - Now You See Me (Arthur Tressler)
- Sam Neill
  - Dead Calm (1993 TV Tokyo edition) (John Ingram)
  - The Hunt for Red October (1999 TV Asashi edition) (Captain Vasily Borodin)
  - The Jungle Book (1996 TV Asashi edition) (Geoffrey Brydon)
  - Jurassic Park III (Dr. Alan Grant)
  - Angel (Théo)
  - Alcatraz (Emerson Hauser)
- Bill Nighy
  - Underworld (Viktor)
  - Underworld: Evolution (Viktor)
  - Underworld: Rise of the Lycans (Viktor)
  - Harry Potter and the Deathly Hallows – Part 1 (Rufus Scrimgeour)
  - Total Recall (Matthias)
- Jeremy Irons
  - The Mission (Father Gabriel)
  - Die Hard with a Vengeance (Simon Gruber)
  - Callas Forever (Larry Kelly)
  - The Time Machine (Über-Morlock)
  - Being Julia (Michael Gosselyn)
- Robert De Niro
  - The Untouchables (2003 TV Tokyo edition) (Al Capone)
  - The Adventures of Rocky and Bullwinkle (Fearless Leader)
  - The Good Shepherd (General William Sullivan)
  - Stone (Jack Mabry)
  - The Family (Fred Blake/Giovanni Manzoni)
- Timothy Dalton
  - Flash Gordon (1992 TV Asahi edition) (Prince Barin)
  - The Living Daylights (1993 TBS edition) (James Bond)
  - Licence to Kill (1996 TBS edition) (James Bond)
  - The Rocketeer (Neville Sinclair)
- 2001: A Space Odyssey (1981 TV Asahi edition) (Dr. Frank Poole (Gary Lockwood))
- 8 Simple Rules (Jim Egan (James Garner))
- Aliens (2004 TV Asahi edition) (Bishop (Lance Henriksen))
- Alien 3 (Jonathan Clemens (Charles Dance))
- All the Right Moves (Coach Burt Nickerson (Craig T. Nelson))
- The Amityville Horror (Father Callaway (Philip Baker Hall))
- Anaconda (1999 TV Asahi edition) (Paul Serone (Jon Voight))
- The Animal (Dr. Wilder (Michael Caton))
- Anna and the King (Mongkut (Chow Yun-fat))
- Apollo 13 (2003 Fuji TV edition) (Gene Kranz (Ed Harris))
- Australia (King Carney (Bryan Brown))
- Batman Begins (2007 NTV and 2008 Fuji TV editions) (William Earle (Rutger Hauer))
- Batman Returns (Max Shreck (Christopher Walken))
- Beethoven (Dr. Herman Varnick (Dean Jones))
- The Best Offer (Virgil Oldman (Geoffrey Rush))
- Blue Steel (Eugene Hunt (Ron Silver))
- The Book Thief (Hans Hubermann (Geoffrey Rush))
- The Bourne Ultimatum (Noah Vosen (David Strathairn))
- Criminal Minds (David Rossi (Joe Mantegna))
- Cujo (1986 TBS edition) (Vic Trenton (Daniel Hugh Kelly))
- Damages (Arthur Frobisher (Ted Danson))
- The Dark Crystal (Blu-Ray edition) (Narrator (Joseph O'Conor))
- Death Race (Coach (Ian McShane))
- The Devil's Advocate (John Milton / Satan (Al Pacino))
- Dharma & Greg (Edward Montgomery (Mitchell Ryan))
- Dr. Dolittle: Tail to the Chief (President Sterling (Peter Coyote))
- Dune (Duke Leto Atreides (Jürgen Prochnow))
- Dutch (Reed Standish (Christopher McDonald))
- Emmanuelle (1996 TV Tokyo edition) (Jean (Daniel Sarky))
- End of Days (Satan (Gabriel Byrne))
- Fast & Furious (Penning (Jack Conley))
- Firewall (2009 TV Asahi edition) (Harry Romano (Robert Forster))
- Fringe (Dr. William Bell (Leonard Nimoy))
- Get Smart (2011 TV Asahi edition) (The Chief (Alan Arkin))
- Get the Gringo (Frank Fowler (Peter Stormare))
- The Godfather (1976 NTV edition) (Enzo the Baker)
- The Golden Child (1992 TV Asahi edition) (Sardo Numspa (Charles Dance))
- GoldenEye (Alec Trevelyan (Sean Bean))
- The Guns of Navarone (Captain Keith Mallory (Gregory Peck))
- The Hunting Party (Simon Hunt (Richard Gere))
- The Insider (Lowell Bergman (Al Pacino))
- Interview with the Vampire (1998 Fuji TV edition) (Armand (Antonio Banderas))
- JFK (Clay Shaw / Clay Bertrand (Tommy Lee Jones))
- Jumanji (Van Pelt, Samuel Parrish (Jonathan Hyde))
- L.A. Confidential (2001 Fuji TV edition) (Pierce Morehouse Patchett (David Strathairn))
- Last Action Hero (Benedict (Charles Dance))
- Lara Croft: Tomb Raider (Lord Richard Croft (Jon Voight))
- Lawrence of Arabia (2000 TV Tokyo edition) (Colonel Harry Brighton (Anthony Quayle))
- The Lone Ranger (Latham Cole (Tom Wilkinson))
- Lorenzo's Oil (Augusto Odone (Nick Nolte))
- Lost in Space (Professor John Robinson (William Hurt))
- Love in the Afternoon (Frank Flannagan (Gary Cooper))
- Lucky Number Slevin (The Rabbi (Ben Kingsley))
- Machete (Michael Booth (Jeff Fahey))
- Maximum Risk (2000 TV Asahi edition) (Ivan Dzasokhov (Zach Grenier))
- Michael Collins (Éamon de Valera (Alan Rickman))
- Millennium (Frank Black (Lance Henriksen))
- Mission: Impossible (1999 Fuji TV edition) (Eugene Kittridge (Henry Czerny))
- No Mercy (Allan Deveneux (William Atherton))
- The Onion Movie (Norm Archer (Len Cariou))
- The Pink Panther (Chief Inspector Charles Dreyfus (Kevin Kline))
- Pistol Whipped (The Old Man (Lance Henriksen))
- Prison Break (John Abruzzi (Peter Stormare))
- The Punisher (Gianni Franco (Jeroen Krabbé))
- Rear Window (L. B. "Jeff" Jefferies (James Stewart))
- Return to the 36th Chamber
- Rising Sun (Lieutenant Tom Graham (Harvey Keitel))
- The Rock (2000 TV Asahi edition) (General Francis X. Hummel (Ed Harris))
- Scanners (1987 NTV edition) (Cameron Vale (Stephen Lack))
- Seven (1998 Fuji TV edition) (John Doe (Kevin Spacey))
- Seven Years in Tibet (Peter Aufschnaiter (David Thewlis))
- Step Brothers (Robert Doback (Richard Jenkins))
- Snake Eyes (Commander Kevin Dunne (Gary Sinise))
- The Social Network (Sy (John Getz))
- A Sound of Thunder (Charles Hatton (Ben Kingsley))
- The Specialist (Colonel Ned Trent (James Woods))
- Species (1999 TV Asahi edition) (Xavier Fitch (Ben Kingsley))
- Supernatural (Bobby Singer (Jim Beaver))
- The Survivor (1983 TV Tokyo edition) (Keller (Robert Powell))
- Tai Chi Hero (Flamming (Peter Stormare))
- The Ten Commandments (2002 TV Asahi edition) (Rameses II (Yul Brynner))
- Thomas and the Magic Railroad (Burnett Stone (Peter Fonda))
- The Three Musketeers (Cardinal Richelieu (Christoph Waltz))
- Tomorrow Never Dies (2001 Fuji TV edition) (Elliot Carver (Jonathan Pryce))
- Top Gun (2009 TV Tokyo edition) (CDR Mike "Viper" Metcalf (Tom Skerritt))
- The Towering Inferno (1979 Fuji TV edition) (Harry Jernigan (O. J. Simpson))
- True Romance (Vincenzo Coccotti (Christopher Walken))
- Tucker: The Man and His Dream (Howard Hughes (Dean Stockwell))
- Uncommon Valor (1987 NTV edition) (Wilkes (Fred Ward))
- Vertical Limit (Montgomery Wick (Scott Glenn))

==== Animation ====
- A.I. Artificial Intelligence (Dr. Know)
- The Animatrix (Kaiser)
- Stuart Little 3: Call of the Wild (2006) (Frederick Little)
- WALL-E (2008) (Shelby Forthright)
