= Shinjuku Gyo-en Greenhouse =

Greenhouse in Shinjuku, Tokyo, Japan

- 新宿御苑
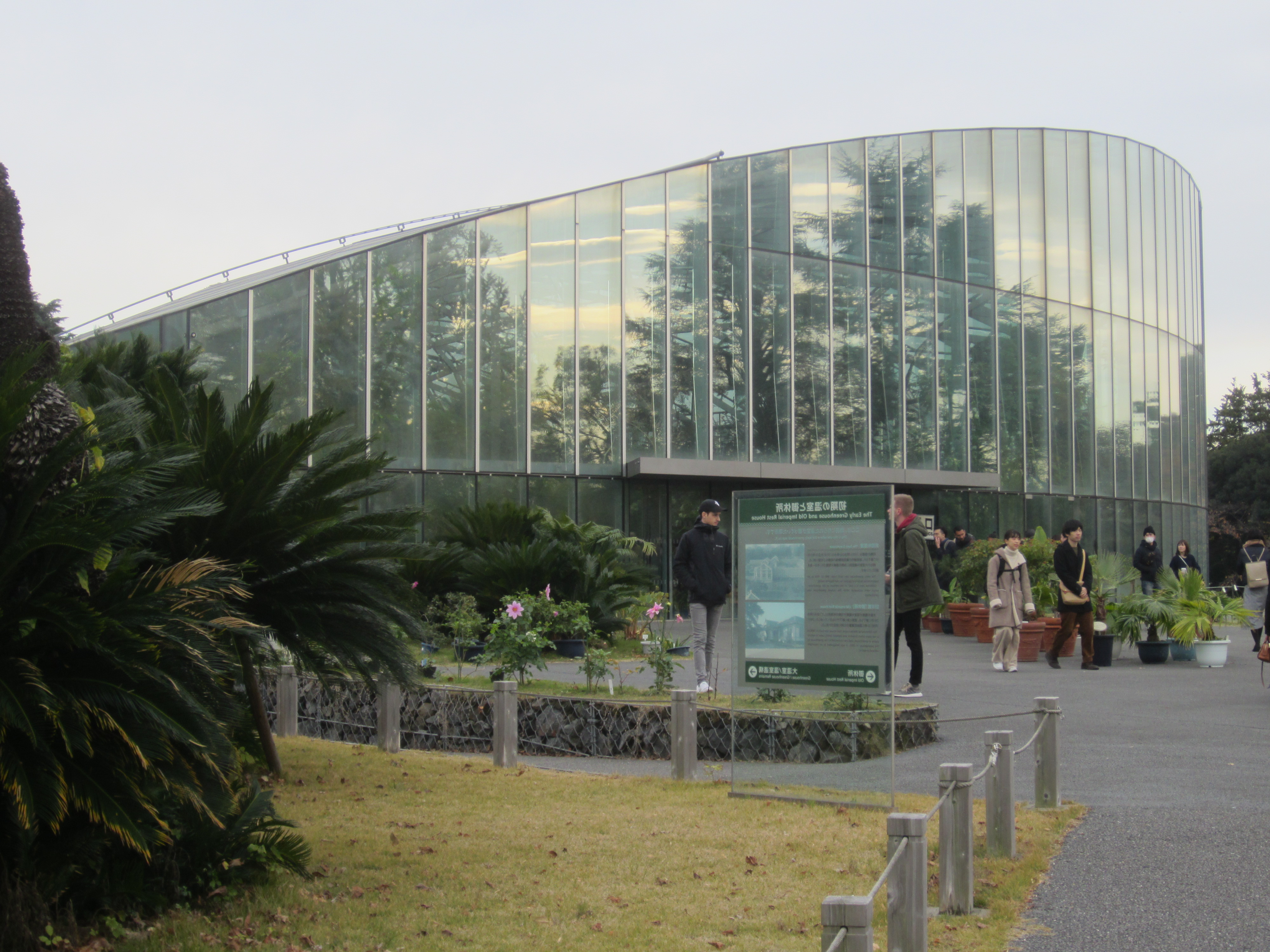
- The greenhouse's exterior in 2019
- Interactive map of the Shinjuku Gyo-en Greenhouse area

General information
- Type: Greenhouse
- Location: Shinjuku, Tokyo, Japan
- Coordinates: 35°41′12″N 139°42′45″E
- Completed: 1950

Design and construction
- Known for: Displays more than 1,700 tropical and subtropical plant species

The Shinjuku Gyo-en Greenhouse is a greenhouse in Shinjuku Gyo-en, Shinjuku, Tokyo, Japan. It was built in 1950 and displays more than 1,700 tropical and subtropical plant species, as of 2016.

== History ==
The Shinjuku Gyo-en Greenhouse was built on the site of a private mansion, property of daimyō Naitō Nobunari.

A government-managed agricultural experiment station was established there in 1872, and was later converted into an imperial garden in 1906. The space was utilised for international diplomacy, and was re-designed and opened to the public after World War II.

The Greenhouse's construction was completed in 1950.
