= The Garden of Words =

2013 Japanese film by Makoto Shinkai

- Theatrical release poster

言の葉の庭 (Kotonoha no Niwa)
- Genre: Drama; Romance
- Manga
- Written by: Makoto Shinkai
- Illustrated by: Midori Motohashi
- Published by: Kodansha
- English publisher: NA: Vertical
- Imprint: Afternoon KC
- Magazine: Monthly Afternoon
- Original run: April 25, 2013 – October 25, 2013
- Volumes: 1
- Anime film
- Directed by: Makoto Shinkai
- Produced by: Noritaka Kawaguchi\
- Written by: Makoto Shinkai
- Music by: Daisuke Kashiwa
- Studio: CoMix Wave Films
- Licensed by: AUS: Madman Entertainment; NA: Sentai Filmworks; UK: Anime Limited
- Released: April 28, 2013 (Gold Coast); May 31, 2013 (Japan)
- Runtime: 46 minutes
- Serial novel
- Written by: Makoto Shinkai
- Published by: Kadokawa Shoten
- Magazine: Da Vinci
- Original run: September 2013 – April 2014
- Volumes: 1
- icon

The Garden of Words (Japanese: 言の葉の庭, Hepburn: Kotonoha no Niwa) is a 2013 Japanese anime drama film written, directed and edited by Makoto Shinkai, animated by CoMix Wave Films and distributed by Toho. It stars Miyu Irino and Kana Hanazawa, and features music by Daisuke Kashiwa instead of Tenmon, who had composed the music for many of Shinkai's previous films. The theme song, "Rain", was originally written and performed by Senri Oe in 1988, but was remade for the film and was sung by Motohiro Hata. The film was made into a manga, with illustrations by Midori Motohashi, and later novelized by Shinkai, both in the same year as the film.

The film focuses on Takao Akizuki, an aspiring 15-year-old shoemaker, and Yukari Yukino, a mysterious 27-year-old woman he keeps meeting at Shinjuku Gyoen National Garden on rainy mornings. While Takao is skipping his morning class to design shoes, Yukari is avoiding work due to personal problems in her professional life. Yukari tells Takao nothing about herself, including her name, while Takao opens up to her, sharing his passion for shoes by offering to make a pair for her. When Takao learns Yukari's identity, emotions come to a head as both learn that they have been teaching each other "how to walk". Shinkai wrote the story as a tale of "lonely sadness", based on the meaning of the traditional Japanese word for "love", and uses shoes as a metaphor for life. The story's motifs include rain, Man'yōshū poetry, and the Japanese garden. The age difference between the two main characters and their character traits demonstrate how awkwardly and disjointedly people mature, where even adults sometimes feel no more mature than teenagers, according to Shinkai.

The Garden of Words premiered at the Gold Coast Film Festival in Australia on April 28, 2013, and had its general release on May 31, 2013, in Japan. For the Japanese premiere, the film was screened with an animated short called Dareka no Manazashi (だれかのまなざし; lit. 'Someone's Gaze'), also directed by Shinkai. The Garden of Words had an unusual release schedule since it was released digitally on iTunes the same day as the Japanese theatrical premiere, and its DVD and Blu-ray were released while the film was still in theaters, on June 21. The film has been licensed by Sentai Filmworks in North America, Anime Limited in the UK, and Madman Entertainment in Australia. It was released on Crunchyroll on December 3, 2025. The film performed well in theaters for an extended period of time and was hosted at many local and international film events. It ranked highly on iTunes Store during 2013 and was selected as the Year's Best Animation in iTunes' Best of 2013. It won the 2013 Kobe Theatrical Film Award and awards at the Fantasia International Film Festival and the Stuttgart Festival of Animated Film. Online reviews were generally favorable with universal praise of the art, though opinions were mixed regarding the story's length, plot and emotional climax.

== Plot ==
The Garden of Words opens at the start of the rainy season in Tokyo with Takao Akizuki (秋月 孝雄, Akizuki Takao), a 15-year-old student and aspiring shoemaker, opting to skip his first class and sketch shoe designs in the garden at Shinjuku Gyoen. There, he encounters Yukari Yukino (雪野 百香里, Yukino Yukari), a 27-year-old woman who is skipping work. Yukari bids him farewell with a tanka (a form of Japanese poetry), leaving Takao puzzled as to its origin and meaning. The two continue to encounter each other and socialize in the park on rainy mornings, but never formally introduce themselves. Takao decides to make a pair of shoes in her size. With the end of the rainy season, he stops visiting the park and focuses on his work.

鳴神の 少し響みて
Narukami no sukoshi toyomite
さし曇り
Sashi kumori
雨も降らぬか
Ame mo furanu ka
君を留めむ
Kimi wo todomemu
[A faint clap of thunder
Clouded skies
Perhaps rain comes
If so, will you stay here with me?]

— Yukari in The Garden of Words
from Man'yōshū, Book 11, verse 2,513

Following summer break, Takao returns to school and spots Yukari, discovering that she is a literature teacher and had been the target of gossip and bullying. To avoid further confrontation, Yukari opted to avoid work and retreat to the park, hoping she would learn to overcome her fears. However, she quits her job and leaves the school. That afternoon, Takao meets Yukari at the park and greets her by reciting the 2,514th poem from the Man'yōshū Japanese poetry collection, the correct response to her tanka, which he found in a classic Japanese literature textbook. After getting soaked by a sudden thunderstorm, both head to Yukari's apartment and spend the afternoon together. When Takao confesses his love, Yukari is moved, but reminds him that she is a teacher and that she is moving back to her hometown on Shikoku. After Takao excuses himself, Yukari realizes her mistake and runs after him. Still upset, Takao angrily takes back what he had said and criticizes her for being so secretive and never opening up to him. Yukari embraces him and the two cry while she explains that their time together in the park had saved her.

鳴神の 少し響みて
Narukami no sukoshi toyomite
降らずとも
Furazu tomo
吾は留まらむ
Ware wa todomaramu
妹し留めば
Imoshi todomeba
[A faint clap of thunder
Even if rain comes not
I will stay here
Together with you]

— Takao in The Garden of Words
from Man'yōshū, Book 11, verse 2,514

The credits show Takao barely passing his final exams, but still working towards his goals, while Yukari moves back to Shikoku and resumes her teaching career. In a post-credits scene, Takao revisits the park that winter, reads a letter from Yukari, places her finished shoes on the bench, then vows that he will find her after he has made progress with his career.

Both the manga and serial novels share differences from the film. In the manga illustrated by Midori Motohashi, scenes were either added or slightly modified from the anime version. For example, after the conclusion of the rainy season, Takao was unable to visit the park during the only rainy morning that summer because he had scheduled to visit the footwear college he wanted to attend, disappointing Yukari who had hoped to see him. At the conclusion of the story, Yukari is seen wearing the shoes Takao had made for her. In the novel, Takao prepared to study abroad in Italy for his shoemaking, and had a party with his family. Before he was in Italy, he exchanged letters with Yukari every month or so, and ended up leaving his email address in one of them. Now with each other's email addresses, every message they sent avoided discussing personal issues such as if they were seeing anyone. In May 2018, he had some days off and decided to return to Tokyo, where he reunited with Yukari in the garden and delivered his promised shoes.

== Characters ==
Takao Akizuki (秋月 孝雄, Akizuki Takao)
Takao Akizuki is a mature, hard-working 15-year-old first year high school student who hopes to become a shoemaker. On rainy mornings, he skips school to design shoes in the park. He is voiced by Miyu Irino in Japanese and Patrick Poole in English. In a scene depicting his childhood, he is voiced by Wataru Sekine in Japanese and Blake Shepard in English. He made a silent cameo appearance at the end of Your Name, another film of Makoto Shinkai.
Yukari Yukino (雪野 百香里, Yukino Yukari; "雪野 由香里" in the manga)
Yukari Yukino is the mysterious 27-year-old woman Takao meets in the park on rainy mornings. Takao later learns that she is a classical-Japanese teacher at his high school, and that she, too, is skipping, but due to her students bullying her. She is voiced by Kana Hanazawa in Japanese and Maggie Flecknoe in English (Katy Vaughn in Your Name). She also appeared in Your Name, teaching some old words for "dusk" in Mitsuha's class, including "Kataware Doki" (かたわれ時, lit. 'broken piece of time') which is important to the plot.
Reimi Akizuki (秋月 怜美, Akizuki Reimi)
Takao's 47-year-old mother is divorced from Takao's father, and is focused more on her love life than her family life. She is voiced by Fumi Hirano in Japanese and Shelley Calene-Black in English.
Shota Akizuki (秋月 翔太, Akizuki Shōta)
Takao's 26-year-old brother, who leaves home to live with his girlfriend, dismisses Takao's shoe-making as a whim. He is voiced by Takeshi Maeda in Japanese and Crash Buist in English.
Rika Teramoto (寺本 梨花, Teramoto Rika)
Shota's 24-year-old girlfriend is friendly with Takao and fascinated by his shoe-making. She is voiced by Yuka Terasaki in Japanese and Brittney Karbowski in English.
Matsumoto (松本)
Matsumoto is Takao's classmate and friend, as well as Satō's boyfriend. He is voiced by Suguru Inoue in Japanese and Mike Yager in English.
Satō (佐藤)
Satō is a second year student in Takao's high school and friend. She is voiced by Megumi Han in Japanese and Allison Sumrall in English.
Shoko Aizawa (相沢 硝子, Aizawa Shōko)
Always surrounded by her friends, Aizawa is a third year student in Takao's high school and the source of Yukari's problems at school. She is voiced by Mikako Komatsu in Japanese and Hilary Haag in English.

== Production ==
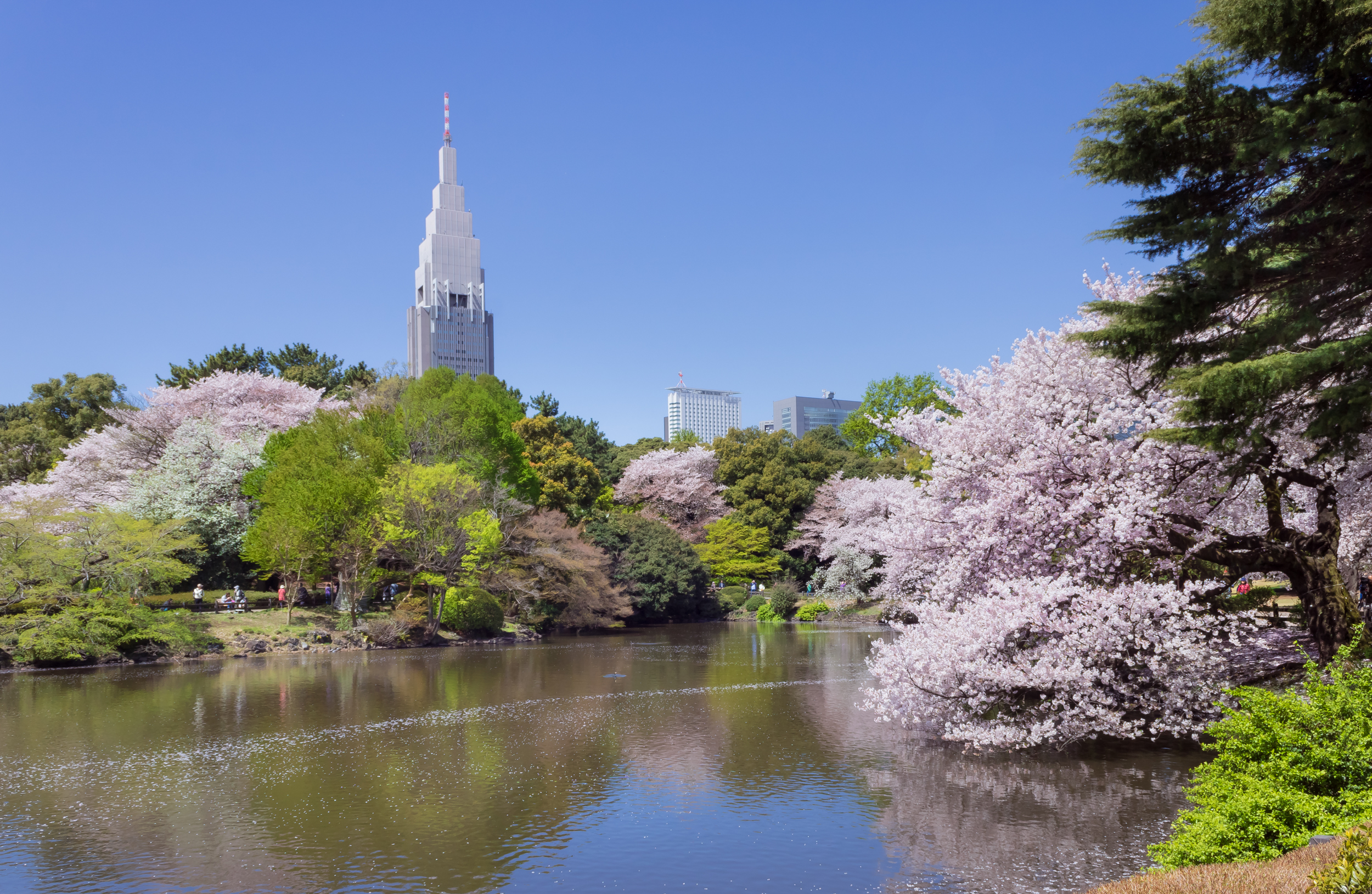
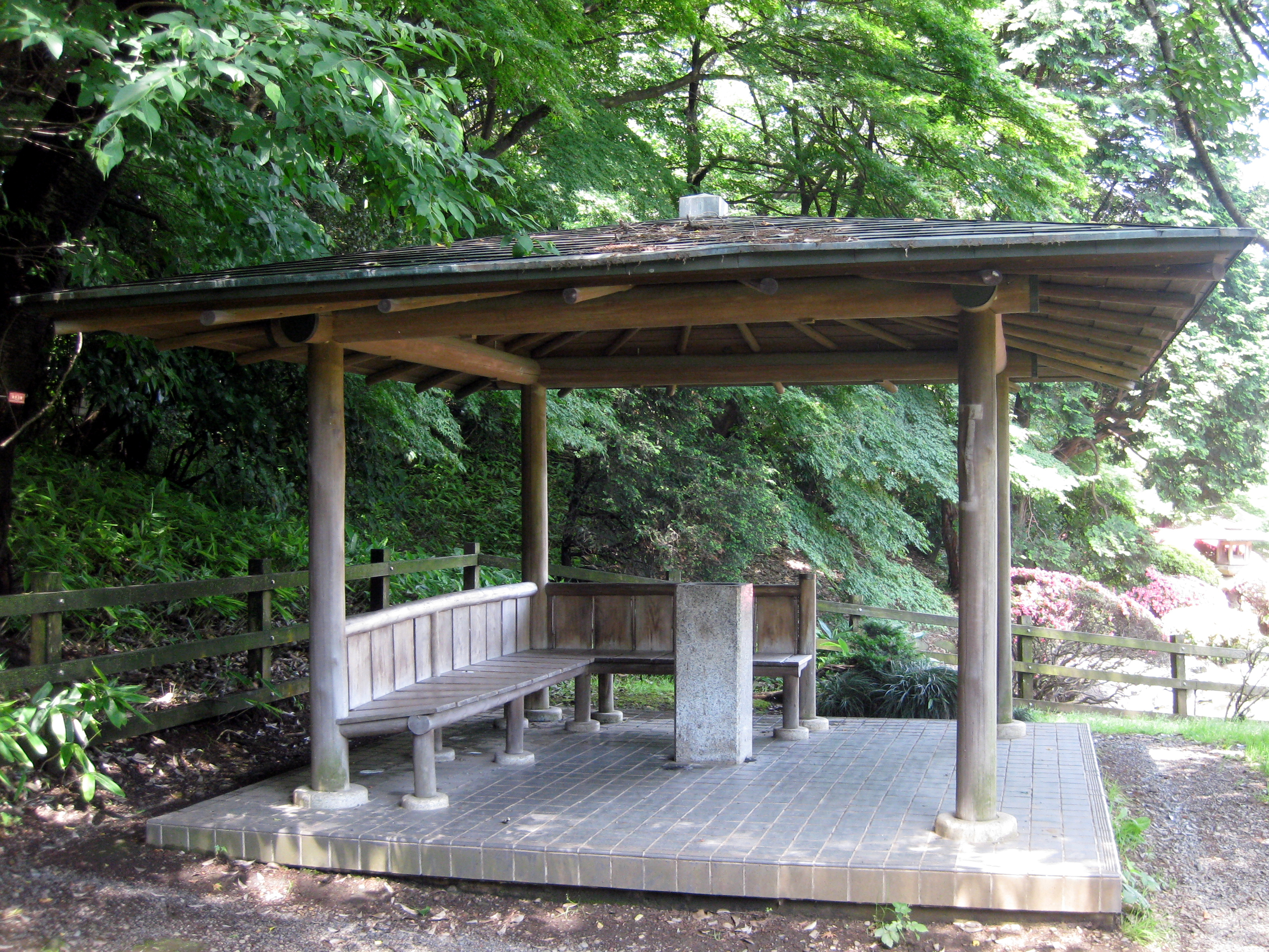
The film was set in Shinjuku and included scenes of Shinjuku Gyoen National Park.

The Garden of Words was directed by Makoto Shinkai, who also wrote the original story and screenplay. He was responsible for the storyboards, animation composite, key animation, and editing. According to Shinkai, his numerous roles in the production of his works are due to the small size of the company, and in this film, it allowed him to tailor many elements of the film to more accurately portray his ideas.

The animated film was produced by Shinkai Creative, CoMix Wave Films, and the producer was Noritaka Kawaguchi. Kenichi Tsuchiya was the animation director and was responsible for character design, while Hiroshi Takiguchi was the art director. Planning for the film began in the spring of 2012 and was announced on December 24 of that year. The Japanese release was initially slated for the first half of 2013. Production took only six months, starting with location scouting by Shinkai around Shinjuku. Production officially started after he had created storyboards based on the photos he took.

Shinkai was approached in early 2013 about adapting the material into a manga, which was then done by Midori Motohashi. In April, Shinkai stated that he was not contributing to the adaptation, leaving the work entirely to the manga artist. However, he did express interest in seeing the finished product.

=== Inspirations, motifs, and metaphors ===
According to Shinkai's announcement of the film early during its production, The Garden of Words was his first attempt at making a love story using the traditional Japanese meaning of "love". During the era of the Man'yōshū, the native Japanese words today known as yamato kotoba (大和言葉; lit. 'Japanese words') were starting to be written using kanji, and the word for "love", koi (today written 恋) was written as 孤悲, or "lonely sadness". As noted by Shinkai, a more modern concept of "romance", represented by ren'ai (恋愛), came about by Western influence. The Garden of Words emphasizes the original meaning of koi—a "longing for someone in solitude"—but in a modern setting. Loneliness is the central element of the film, according to Shinkai. In an interview, he said he created the film with the hope of cheering up people who feel lonely or incomplete in their social relations. However, he made a point that "this movie doesn't treat loneliness as something that must be fixed."

Photographs (bottom) were used as a base, with the art (top) drawn over them.

Although the story's central theme is loneliness, it uses shoes and rain as motifs, along with Man'yōshū poetry and the Japanese garden in which it is set. Although rain is typically seen as sad and gloomy, in The Garden of Words it makes the world more vivid and protects the two main characters from the reality of their lives and the limitations imposed by society.

According to Shinkai, shoes were a metaphor for life as Yukari learned to walk again, while Takao's shoe-making typified their relationship. Similarly, Yukari's choice of food and beverages—initially beer and chocolate, due to a stress-induced taste disorder—was a metaphor for her emotional health.

In many of Shinkai's films, sad endings resulting from misunderstandings and unrequited feelings are common. According to Shinkai, his stories are intended to encourage teenagers as they learn to cope with these commonplace experiences. In an interview, he admitted that he had been accustomed to being turned down by women, and felt that his stories were encouraging because his characters continue to try, despite being unsuccessful at love. The Garden of Words also illustrated how people do not mature as linearly or elegantly as we often assume. Shinkai himself could relate with Yukari in not feeling as smart or mature at age 27, stating, "We're all still just children at age 27," a point that voice actress Kana Hanazawa also agreed with.

The original idea for The Garden of Words came from Shinkai's desire to capture the beauty of the daily scenery in modern Tokyo and showcase it in a film. Having lived for ten years in Shinjuku, he selected it as the location of the film and set about taking thousands of photos, upon which he created his storyboards. Wanting to share the peace and harmony of his favorite locations in Japan with the hope that it would encourage people to visit, Shinkai modeled the garden in the film to match Shinjuku Gyoen National Garden in Tokyo. Following the earthquake in March 2011, he was worried that it could be destroyed and wanted to preserve it in an animated film.

=== Animation ===
During production, a novel coloring method was used to mimic the refraction of light on the skin of the characters.

Like other Japanese anime, The Garden of Words was created using a combination of hand-drawn animation, rotoscoping and computer animation (CGI), with the latter facilitating the realistic appearance of the film's rain sequences. Shinkai made half of the film's backgrounds by using his photographs as a base and then drawing over the top with Adobe Photoshop, while the other half were fictional settings created with traditional animation and computer graphics. As with his other films, the backgrounds are vivid and meticulously drawn scenery while the characters are drawn with less detail, though they are still convincing and realistic.

For the rainy scenes at the park, the color palette was toned down, and pale green shading was used to match the gloomy, rainy weather, thereby increasing the detail and defining the characters. Matching the tones to the background and lighting helped highlight the characters' faces. According to Shinkai, a novel coloring method was chosen from other coloring methods following careful testing. The method involved integrating the coloring for each character with the background, a "new innovation of sorts" that mimics the refraction of light on the skin as seen in nature. This was accomplished by coloring the outline of the character, including the lines drawn for the separation of lit and shadowed surfaces, and then incorporating the background color onto the surface. Shinkai felt that this coloring method made the anime stand out from others.

=== Character design and casting ===
Shinkai originally envisioned Takao as a boy who wants to help people, but also felt that he should have a passion for making something, since creative work can be rewarding and fulfilling. On a list he made of potential crafts, he picked out the word "shoes". After testing it out with his initial plans for the story, he found that it worked out, and in hindsight, he realized that shoemakers also assist people with walking.

When first presenting the original story to the rest of his team, the team learned that Yukari had unintentionally come across as selfish. To remedy this, he gave her character nervous traits and personality flaws, such as letting her emotions spill over during mildly upsetting events. Shinkai later realized that some of these personality quirks and temporary professional challenges seen in Yukari were present in a former girlfriend, for whom he had written his short film She and Her Cat. In addition to making Yukari's character more convincing, these character flaws also made it more difficult to plan since she had to be both flawed and attractive to a young boy. One aspect of her character that Shinkai focused on was her appearance. He felt that she had to be dressed in nice clothes, and particularly nice shoes. In order to balance realism with fashion, he researched shoemaking, worked with a clothing coordinator and stylist, and held weekly fashion meetings with his staff.

One of the "complicated realistic elements" of Yukari's character was her sense of purity that only her voice could convey. Though it took days of listening to the audition tapes, Shinkai finally chose Kana Hanazawa, who had a very low natural voice, despite typically playing the roles of high-pitched younger girls. One of the things that impressed Shinkai about Hanazawa's voice was her ability to cover such a broad range of expression.

It was the final scene of the film that made Shinkai glad he had cast Hanazawa. He knew that when Yukari cried, it had to be something impressive in order to emphasize an intense release of emotion. According to Shinkai, music alone could not produce the needed effect, and Hanazawa performed perfectly and without instruction. In an interview, he said, "I believe that Ms. Hanazawa's acting on that crying scene alone completes the film." This final scene, which was recorded perfectly on the first take, played a pivotal role in the casting decision for Takao's character. Though many Japanese voice actors could portray a naïve 15-year-old boy, Shinkai immediately recognized that only Miyu Irino could produce the intense emotion needed for the closing scene. Irino had also played Shun and Shin in Shinkai's Children Who Chase Lost Voices.

In regards to the English dub, Shinkai did not feel that he could judge the quality of the voice acting since he could not speak English natively. He felt that it was good due to the feedback he had received and because he could feel the emotion in the characters' voices. However, he noted that the experience would be different for viewers and that the final judgment could only be made by English-speaking audiences.

=== Length ===
The Garden of Words is short, lasting approximately 46 minutes in length, a trend also seen among Shinkai's earlier works. Although he had stated in an interview with Anime News Network that he does like making shorter films, Shinkai noted that he did not originally plan for the film to be played in theaters. Instead, he intended for people to casually view the film on tablets, computers, and in home theaters. A target length was never specified from the outset, instead the relationship between Takao and Yukari was emphasized, although it was known from early in the production that the film would be short.

Shinkai acknowledged that it is difficult to sell 46-minute films in theaters; however, many individuals in the industry had requested to show the film in theaters and conventions. During an interview at Anime Expo 2013, a representative from Toho, the film's distribution company, emphasized that the quality of the story and the reputation of its director played a key role in the decision to bring it to theaters.

=== Music ===
In Shinkai's previous films, the music was produced by Tenmon; however, The Garden of Words features music by Daisuke Kashiwa. Kashiwa had been a fan of Shinkai's 5 Centimeters Per Second and had sent him several of his albums. Shinkai listened to these albums while writing the screenplay and then elected to base the film's music on the songs from Kashiwa's album 88. In an interview, Shinkai said that the music was primarily responsible for making the movie seem "unlike other anime".

The theme song, "Rain", was written and composed by Senri Oe, and was originally a popular Japanese song in 1988. Shinkai enjoyed listening to Oe's song regularly while attending university, and since one of the film's themes was rain, it was the first song that came to mind while he worked on the production. He particularly liked the song because its lyrics reflected daily life, much like the film. The song was remade for the film in 2013, and sung by Motohiro Hata. Shinkai met Hata on several occasions and noted a similarity between Hata's passion as an artisan and that of the character Takao. Shinkai also felt that Hata's voice was perfect because to him it carried an "underlying loneliness" and "sounded a little like an anxious young man".

== Soundtrack ==
The Garden of Words

Soundtrack album by Daisuke Kashiwa
- Released: May 31, 2013
- Studios: Flat (Chūō, Tokyo, Japan); Meguro Sōko (Meguro, Tokyo, Japan)
- Length: 14:42
- Labels: CoMix Wave Films; Toho Animation

Daisuke Kashiwa chronology
Re: (2012)	The Garden of Words (2013)	9 Songs (2014)

The soundtrack for the film was composed by Daisuke Kashiwa. It was first released on May 31, 2013, by CoMix Wave Films and later released on June 21, 2013, by Toho Animation Records.

All music is composed by Daisuke Kashiwa.

The Garden of Words
No.	Title	Length
1.	"A Rainy Morning ~Main Title~"	0:50
2.	"Greenery Rain"	3:01
3.	"Rain of Recollection"	1:08
4.	"While Hearing Sound of Rain"	1:43
5.	"A Silent Summer"	4:09
6.	"The Afternoon of Rainy day"	3:06
7.	"A Rainy Morning ~Epilogue~"	0:45
Total length:		14:42

=== Personnel ===
==== Musicians ====
- Daisuke Kashiwa – music, recording engineer, mixing engineer
- Mio Okamura (岡村 美央, Okamura Mio) – violin
- Seigen Tokuzawa (徳澤 青弦, Tokuzawa Seigen) – cello

==== Production ====
- Hideaki Takahashi (高橋 英明, Takahashi Hideaki) – music supervisor
- Junji Kubo (久保 淳司, Kubo Junji) – music production manager
- Tetsuya Yamamoto (山本 哲也, Yamamoto Tetsuya), Daisuke Kashiwa – recording engineer
- Daisuke Kashiwa – mixing engineer
- Studio Flat, Meguro Sōko (目黒倉庫) (Meguro, Tokyo, Japan) – recording studio
- Meguro Sōko – mixing studio

== Themes ==
Two common themes among Shinkai's films, including The Garden of Words, are subtle romances and lingering emotions. However, this film's focus on "lonely sadness" (koi) was interpreted in a couple of ways. According to Cynthia Webb of The Jakarta Post, the loneliness is seen at the end of the film, when Takao learns to cope with Yukari's move to Shikoku. Luke Carroll at Anime News Network felt the end of the rainy season and the resulting separation created the sense of koi.

Bradly Halestorm at Hardcore Gamer found that, through their conversations, Yukari and Takao found companionship: Takao finding someone he can share his passion with, and Yukari finding someone who treats her as a person. However, because of the age difference, this discovery varied between the characters. For Yukari, an older and more experienced individual, her hopeless feelings of lonely sadness disappeared when she learned she could connect with Takao, a revelation that she saw as her salvation. For Takao, a boy with an unsupportive family and friends who seemed more like acquaintances, he did not realize his lack of companionship until he discovered it with Yukari, a new feeling he mistook for romantic love but only realized its true nature after she had moved away. Instead, the love they shared was more basic, making the age difference immaterial. At the end of the film, both characters maintained their friendship through letters, but otherwise began growing as people by moving on with their lives and presumably finding new relationships with other people. The hope was that one day they could reunite and renew their companionship "without needing to cling to each other". However, neither could "learn to walk again" if they continued to isolate themselves from the rest of the world and take shelter with each other in the garden at Shinjuku Gyoen.

Another one of the themes discussed by the film's reviewers was rain or water. According to Cynthia Webb, the rain represented "unfulfilled longing", while Bradly Halestorm saw water as a third main character to the story, acting to both bring Takao and Yukari together and to symbolize the renewal of life. In this way, the rain comes to represent their loneliness, while simultaneously acknowledging Shinkai's statement that the rain symbolized uncontrollable love.

== Promotion and release ==
=== Premiere ===
The anime film was announced in Japan on December 24, 2012, with the release scheduled for the first half of 2013 and news updates available on its Facebook page. On February 20, 2013, the film's production company, CoMix Wave Films, released a trailer with subtitles in multiple languages on YouTube and announced that it would be released in Japan on May 31, 2013.

In early April, it was announced that the world premiere of the film would be held at Gold Coast Film Festival (GCFF) in Broadbeach, Queensland, Australia. Scheduled for the end of the festival at 4:00 PM on April 28, 2013, the film was part of the 'Cool Japan' Gold Coast lineup and included a guest appearance and discussion with Shinkai. The film's premiere was hosted in Australia as a way of showing appreciation to Australians for their support. According to the GCFF's director, the film sold out in advance and was relocated to a larger theater. Despite feeling nervous about the world premiere, Shinkai provided a discussion of the film and asked everyone to not share the plot and story until after the Japanese release the following month. Shinkai was scheduled for an hour-long movie poster signing, but ended up staying two and a half hours to accommodate the high turnout.

Following the world premiere, but ahead of the Japanese premiere on May 31, the first five minutes of the film were previewed on TV Tokyo and NTV on May 12. On May 22, it was announced on Shinkai's official Twitter account that the film would play in Japan, Hong Kong, and Taiwan at the same time and that the film would be available on iTunes on the day of the release. Additionally, the Japanese premiere would include a screening of Shinkai's short film, Dareka no Manazashi, which was released earlier that same year. By October, it was reported that many theaters in Japan had extended screening of the film.

The official English language premiere of The Garden of Words was next shown in the United States at the Los Angeles Convention Center on July 6 and 7 as part of Anime Expo 2013. Sentai Filmworks hosted the film, and Shinkai was the Special Guest of Honor for the expo. The Canadian premiere was held at Montreal's 2013 Fantasia International Film Festival, where the film was screened on July 22 and 25. The film then returned to Australia when it screened alongside Ghost in the Shell: Arise at Madman Entertainment's Reel Anime 2013.

The Garden of Words was shown in Moscow on September 27, 2013, after which Shinkai made an appearance to answer questions. He also attended the UK premiere, which took place during Scotland Loves Anime 2013 in mid-October, where it was played in conjunction with Shinkai's earlier work, The Place Promised in Our Early Days. By late February 2014, the film had been shown in 11 countries. In 2014, it was showcased at Amsterdam's Imagine Film Festival in mid-April, at the Stuttgart Festival of Animated Film in late-April, with Dareka no Manazashi on May 21 in Italian theaters as part of the Nexo Anime project, and at the Japan Film Festival of San Francisco (JFFSF) in late-July.

=== Theatrical and home media ===
The film was released in digital format on iTunes on the same day as the theatrical release, which was very unusual for a film. Furthermore, the DVD and Blu-ray were made available while the film was still playing in theaters. With the Japanese premiere on May 31, the DVD and Blu-ray editions were released in Japan less than a month later, on June 21. The DVD came with a 16-page booklet and approximately 30 minutes bonus features, including a short version of some interviews with Shinkai and the cast. The Blu-ray had similar features, except it contained 90 minutes of bonus features, including a long version of the interviews.

On April 24, 2013, the video distribution company Section23 and the licensing company Sentai Filmworks announced their acquisition of the license and plans to release a digital version and the North American bilingual DVD and Blu-ray later in the year. The DVD and Blu-ray were both released on August 6, 2013. The Blu-ray used 1080p AVC (Advanced Video Coding) with an aspect ratio of 1.78:1 Widescreen and audio encoded with the lossless DTS-HD Master Audio codec. Its packaging did not include inserts or a reversible cover.

The DVD and Blu-ray releases for the UK were licensed by Anime Limited, which was announced on October 18, 2013. During the 2013 Lucca Comics & Games convention, the Italian publisher Dynit announced that it had acquired the rights to distribute the film. Australian distributor Madman Entertainment released the DVD on February 19, 2014. The French publishing company Kazé released a German and Japanese dubbed DVD on March 28, 2014, which also included the short film Dareka no Manazashi.

== Related media ==
=== Manga ===
A manga adaptation of the story illustrated by Midori Motohashi was serialized in Kodansha's seinen manga magazine Monthly Afternoon from April 25 to October 25, 2013. Kodansha collected its seven chapters in a single tankōbon volume, released on November 22, 2013. In February 2014, North American publisher Vertical announced at the Katsucon anime convention that it had licensed Motohashi's manga; the English translation was released on October 28, 2014.

No.	Original release date	Original ISBN	English release date	English ISBN
1	November 22, 2013	978-4-06-387941-4	October 28, 2014 (print); March 8, 2016 (digital)	978-1-93913-083-9 (print); 978-1-68233-238-2 (digital)
1. "A clap of thunder" (鳴る神の, Narukamino); 2. "When the evistal rains fall" (五月雨のころ, Samidare no Koro); 3. "Sun Shower" (日照雨降る, Sobae Furu); 4. "Westward Moon" (西へ行く月, Nishi e Iku Tsuki); 5. "And no rain falls" (降らずとも, Furazutomo); 6. "A Living Mirage" (逃げ水のひと, Nigemizu no hito); 7. "Glowing Road" (茜さす路, Akane Sasu Michi)

=== Novel ===
With editing by Media Factory, Shinkai himself created a novelization of the story, which drew many responses on Twitter following serialization. It was released in monthly installments in the September 2013 to April 2014 issues of Da Vinci magazine. The full novel, which contained new scenes not present in the film or serialized novel chapters, was published by Kadokawa Shoten on April 11, 2014. On March 6, 2020, Yen Press announced that it has licensed the novel for North American release, which was released on August 25, 2020.

=== Stage play ===
On October 14, 2019, it was announced that U.K. theatrical company Whole Hog Theatre is producing a stage play adaptation of the film. The play was held at Park Theatre at London's Finsbury Park in 2020, from July 15 to August 15 after previews on July 15–16. The play ran in Tokyo, and Nelke Planning was participating in production. The play was to be performed in English with "occasional Japanese," and it will feature "puppetry, movement and projection art." Alexandra Rutter, who also directed Studio Ghibli's Princess Mononoke stage play for Whole Hog Theatre, served as director and co-adapter with Susan Momoko Hingley. However, the stage play postponed by the outbreak of COVID-19, but was dedicated to continue the project. In April 2023, Whole Hog Theatre announced that the stage play was picked up again. On May 31, 2023, it was announced that the stage play would have performances in both London and Tokyo, coinciding with the film's 10th anniversary. The London stage play ran from August 10 to September 9, starring Hiroki Berrecloth as Takao and Aki Nakagawa as Yukari, and Tokyo's performances started November 9. For the Japan run, Kurumu Okamiya and Mitsuki Tanimura were cast as Takao and Yukino respectively.

== Reception ==
Like many of Shinkai's other films, The Garden of Words was considered most appropriate for teenage and adult audiences due to its more intense and personal mood. The film performed strongly at the box office, with many theaters offering extended screenings. Because of its theatrical success, the film has been considered one of Shinkai's biggest hits. Shinkai considered it one of his best films, and reviews of the story in each media form were equally favorable. The digital version ranked 7th on the iTunes store for Western and Japanese films by the end of 2013. In the year following its initial release, it continued to be a popular at local and international film events. The news and review site, ICv2, listed the DVD under "The Best of 2013: Anime".

=== Reviews ===
At Anime News Network, Luke Carroll praised the film, calling it a "visual treat", but was disappointed in the short length and found Shinkai's new coloring method to be distracting. Jon Hayward was impressed by the "almost photo realistic" quality of the scenery, particularly in Shinjuku Gyoen. The Managing Editor, Bamboo Dong, described it as "beautifully designed and tenderly animated, it is nature eye candy at its finest." She was impressed by the film's unrushed yet thorough story despite its short length and praised both the music and art. In particular, she noted the beauty of the light reflections, rain scenes, and camera angles.

At UK Anime Network, Andy Hanley gave it a score of 10/10, calling it "visually beautiful with a touching story to match". He praised the natural progression of their relationship, despite the age gap, and enjoyed the emotional climax of the film. Hanley felt that The Garden of Words had a "tighter focus" than Children Who Chase Lost Voices and a better ending than 5 Centimeters Per Second, concluding it was Shinkai's best work yet. Dan Rhodes called the film "a real return to form for Makoto Shinkai" following Children Who Chase Lost Voices, which he felt had been an attempt by Shinkai to live up to the common expectation of being the "next Hayao Miyazaki." He praised the film for its beauty, romance, pacing, and subtlety. Although he felt that the film's ending was an improvement over the ending to 5 Centimeters Per Second, he described it as rushed and overly emotional. However, he was very critical of the English dub, which he felt adversely affected both content and mood.

Every screenshot from his new anime masterpiece The Garden of Words could be framed and hung in an art gallery... If you have never seen an anime film before, this is the perfect moment for you to immerse yourself into a whole new film experience.

— GCFF Director, Casey Marshall Siemer

Bradly Halestorm at Hardcore Gamer gave it a 4.5 out of 5, describing it as "painfully intimate and touchingly sentimental" and "the single most beautiful animated film ever created". Despite the film's length, Storm was impressed that Shinkai was able to connect his audience with his characters faster and more effectively than full-length films. He worried that some viewers might miss the subtle message of the film and view it as a "by-the-books love story that can feel cliché or even trite". Curtis Stone of Geekenstein gave it a 5 out of 5 and rated it #1 in his top five list of anime for 2013. He praised not only the art and music, but especially the voice acting, which he felt was perfect for the final scene. Lindsay Nelson at Midnight Eye compared the film to Whisper of the Heart by Studio Ghibli for its poetic use of "seemingly bland and uninteresting locations". She was impressed with both the sound and art, and particularly the sweeping view of the Docomo tower with the sunset in the background. However, she criticized it for its "tearfully over-the-top climax", "treacly" pop theme song, and lack of reflective silence.

Andrew Hamlin at Northwest Asian Weekly gave it a 3.5 out of 4 stars, applauding its poetic use of nature while criticizing the film's brevity. Trung Rwo at Twitch Film also praised the artwork and felt the film displayed "honest and fresh emotions". He described it as "clean and cute, a little bit cheesy" due to the highly emotional ending. Sam at Otaku's Study gave the film an A−, describing it as an "immersive love story" and complimenting the Japanese voice acting and music. Allen Moody of T.H.E.M. Anime Reviews praised the artwork and claimed it overshadowed the film's flaws, which he felt were its short length and underdeveloped story. Chris Beveridge at The Fandom Post praised the artwork, but felt that the story was weak, noting the simplicity of the plot, the abrupt ending, and the awkwardness of the age difference between the two main characters. Amy Wong, the editor at Yam, called it "a story of solitude and heartache that comes before love." She praised the animation as its best feature, but also enjoyed its pace, though she saw the climax as overblown. Akumetsu at Anime e Manga thought the film could have been a masterpiece, but felt the plot was too straightforward, the film was too short, and the conclusion came too dramatically.

Chris Beveridge at The Fandom Post reviewed the Blu-ray release, noting that the dialogue was "clean and clear" throughout the entire playback and described the high definition video as something worth showing off. He also felt the disc included a fair number of extras given the quick release. Matt Hinrichs at DVD Talk felt the video made a clean transfer from digital to Blu-ray, the atmospheric sound effects were "carefully crafted", and that the dialog in the center channel was clear. Dan Rhodes at UK Anime Network gave the DVD by Anime Limited a 9 out of 10, calling it a "barebones release", though praising its reversible insert.

=== Awards and other recognition ===
Not only did the iTunes Store staff recommend The Garden of Words, it was selected as the Year's Best Animation in iTunes' Best of 2013. In addition to the high acclaim on iTunes, The Garden of Words won the 2013 Kobe Theatrical Film Award. At the 2013 Fantasia International Film Festival, it shared the Satoshi Kon Award for Achievement in Animation with Berserk: Golden Age Arc III – Descent while winning the Audience Award for Best Animation Feature. It was part of the Jury Selections of the 17th Japan Media Arts Festival in the Animation category. At the 2014 Stuttgart Festival of Animated Film, it won the AniMovie Award for feature films. The film has won the French award "Daruma Best Screenplay" at the Japan Expo Awards 2016.

Storyboards, original art, and other material from The Garden of Words were exhibited between June 28 and October 19, 2014 at the Ooka Makoto Kotoba Museum in Mishima, Shizuoka Prefecture. The museum, run by Z-Kai Co., also featured Shinkai's commercial Cross Road (made for Z-Kai Co.), along with She and Her Cat and 5 Centimeters Per Second. In addition to the display materials and film viewings for each of the works, a replica of the shoes designed by Takao was also on display.
