= Satomi Hanamura =

Japanese actress and voice actress

- 花村怜美
- Born: July 3, 1984 (age 42)
- Occupations: Actress, voice actress
- Agent: AT Production
- Notable credit: Battle Royale as Yuka Nakagawa

Satomi Hanamura (花村怜美, Hanamura Satomi; born July 3, 1984) is a Japanese actress and voice actress. She is a member of the pop group Sorachoco. She is represented with AT Production.

Hanamura is known for her role as Yuka Nakagawa in Battle Royale.

She also held a voice actor credit as a character in Galaxy Angel Rune.

== Filmography ==
- Battle Royale (2000) as Yuka Nakagawa
- Nanaka 6/17 (2003) as Miko-san
- 5 Centimeters Per Second (2007) as Kanae Sumida
- Tokyo Magnitude 8.0 (2009) as Mirai Onosawa
- Dareka no Manazashi (2013) as Aya Okamura
- Project X Zone 2 (2015) as Mayoi Ayasato
- Beyblade Burst (2016) as Katana Sakaki
- Phoenix Wright: Ace Attorney − Spirit of Justice (2016) as Mayoi Ayasato
- Kamiwaza Wanda (2016) as Mrs. Hina and Mrs. Kohinata
