= Dareka no Manazashi =

2013 anime short film by Makoto Shinkai

- Cover art for Dareka no Manazashi

だれかのまなざし
- Genre: Drama; Slice of life Science fiction
- Anime film
- Directed by: Makoto Shinkai
- Written by: Makoto Shinkai
- Music by: Akihisa Matsuura
- Studio: CoMix Wave Films
- Released: February 10, 2013
- Runtime: 7 minutes
- icon

Dareka no Manazashi (Japanese: だれかのまなざし; lit. 'Someone's Gaze') is a Japanese anime short film written and directed by Makoto Shinkai. It was initially screened at the Tokyo International Forum on February 10, 2013, though it was also shown alongside Shinkai's film The Garden of Words during its Japanese premier on May 31, 2013. It was later posted on YouTube from September 2013 to January 2014. Dareka no Manazashi is a slightly futuristic story about the maturation of a recently independent young woman and her changing relationship with her father. The story develops through reminiscent scenes of their family life and the connection the girl and her father share with the family's cat.

The film was produced by CoMix Wave Films, NEST, and TYO M1 Production in collaboration with The Answer Studio Co., Ltd. The voice cast includes Fumi Hirano, Satomi Hanamura, and Shinji Ogawa. Hirano's narration was crucial in helping Shinkai structure the film. Other leading staff included Makoto Taiga, Miho Suzuki, and Takumi Tanji. Akihisa Matsuura directed the music, and Kazusa wrote and sang the theme song, "Sore de Ii yo" (それでいいよ; lit. It's all fine), which was aimed at matching the tastes of a younger generation.

Online reviews and comments universally praised the film as heartfelt and artistically vibrant, though it was criticized for its brevity. It was described as "deeply emotional", particularly for older viewers due to its emphasis on family bonds as a family changes over time.

== Plot ==
Set in the near future, the story focuses on a recently independent daughter Aya Okamura (岡村綾, Okamura Aya), her parents, and their pet cat Mii (ミ一). Aya had recently taken a job that allowed her to move away from home, and her father, Kōji (浩司), lives at home alone with their cat while Aya's mother, Minako (美菜子), is working overseas. Mii is an old cat, originally obtained as a kitten by Aya's father to help his young daughter cope with her mother's absence, and is now in poor health. The story is narrated from the cat's perspective.

The story begins with Aya returning home from a rough day at work. After relaxing on her bed, she receives a phone call from her father, who wants to have dinner with her; however, she declines by lying about still being at work. The narrator then reminisces about Aya's childhood and family life, particularly dwelling upon how her maturity and independence had created distance between her and her father, who is increasingly lonely yet happy for her. Later that night, Aya awakens to another phone call from her father. Having learned of Mii's death, she visits her father and has lunch with him, an experience that brings the two closer together. Aya later visits her father to see the new kitten he bought. At the same time, her mother rings the doorbell and the family is reunited, their happiness renewed.

== Production ==
The importance of family bonds was a key theme for the film.

Dareka no Manazashi was written and directed by Makoto Shinkai, who directed Voices of a Distant Star and 5 Centimeters Per Second. It was produced by CoMix Wave Films, NEST, and TYO M1 Production in collaboration with The Answer Studio Co., Ltd. The assistant director was Makoto Taiga, the animation director and character designer was Miho Suzuki, and the art director was Takumi Tanji. The music was directed by Akihisa Matsuura, and the theme song, "Sore de Ii yo" (それでいいよ; lit. It's all fine), was performed by the singer-songwriter Kazusa. Shinkai said he chose Kazusa to perform the theme song because she could provide "the sort of music that the young encounter", fitting with the film's theme. The voice cast includes Fumi Hirano as Mii, Satomi Hanamura as Aya Okamura, and Shinji Ogawa as Kōji Okamura. The short film is 6 minutes 40 seconds in length.

The short film was made with the support of Nomura Real Estate Group for its "Proud Box Appreciation Festival" (プラウドボックス感謝祭), a home living exposition at the Tokyo International Forum. According to Shinkai, the greatest challenge in the project was to keep the animation both short and entertaining while also covering the two main themes: family bonds and the future. Hirano's narration, which provided character background and insight into their personalities, helped Shinkai structure the film.

== Release ==
Dareka no Manazashi was announced on Shinkai's official website on January 10, 2013. On January 23, Nomura Real Estate Group streamed the trailer, and announced plans to screen the short film on February 10, during the "Proud Box Appreciation Festival". On May 22, 2013, Shinkai tweeted that he would also include the short with the Japanese premiere of The Garden of Words on May 31, 2013. The two films were also screened together for the Italian cinematic release on May 21, 2014.

The entire film was uploaded to YouTube through Nomura Real Estate Group's ProudChannel on September 5, 2013, and was streamed starting September 9. English subtitles were added on September 11. It was originally scheduled to be taken down on January 12, 2014, but remained available until January 21. During the four months it was available, it was viewed more than 745,000 times. On March 28, 2014, Dareka no Manazashi was included with the "Extras" on the limited edition The Garden of Words DVD distributed by Kazé in Germany (subtitled in German).

== Reception ==
Dareka no Manazashi was positively received in Japan, and attracted particular interest once available on YouTube. Megumi Sawai of RocketNews24 quoted what she called typical online comments on the film, all of which described the emotional impact it had: "It was very good, and deeply emotional." "Hopelessly, I was reduced to tears." Sawai herself credited the film for the high quality of the art, and its message, saying it reminded her of the "bonds between family members, which remain unchanged even as the form of a family changes". ASCII.jp said that "even young viewers can be moved by sympathy" after watching it, but that its greatest emotional impact might be for older audiences.

According to Curtis Stone at Geekenstein, the artwork was "vibrant and meticulous" and the story was "exceptional", and along with its execution and character development, he felt that Dareka no Manazahshi was "utterly enrapturing" despite its shortness. Stone was most impressed by how people could so easily relate to the characters emotionally, despite the film's brevity. His only minor criticism was that the ending left open tantalizing questions about the family's future, though he noted that this did not detract from the film's message. UKAniFest called the short film "heartstringy" and characterized it as one of those hard-to-find "little gems".
