= Camille Alliali =

Ivorian politician (born 1926)

Personal details
- Born: 23 November 1926 (age 99)
- Citizenship: Ivory Coast
- Occupation: Politician, Lawyer

Camille Alliali (born 23 November 1926) is an Ivorian politician, lawyer and diplomat who served in several roles for President Félix Houphouët-Boigny from 1963 to 1989.

== Early life ==
Alliali was born on 23 November 1926 in Toumodi, a town located 40 km from Yamoussoukro. His parents were Baoulé peasants. Alliali began his education in his home village, later going to a higher primary school in Bingerville. Following his primary studies, Alliali went to the École normale William-Ponty in Sébikotane, Sénégal, before enrolling in the law school at the Université de Grenoble. Following graduation from Grenoble, Alliali passed the bar and worked as a lawyer in Paris.

== Judicial career ==
Upon his return to Côte d'Ivoire, the PDCI was in the middle of its fight against French colonial authorities. Originally, Alliali wanted to work with colonial authorities in order to continue his career as a lawyer and represent his compatriots. However, because defense lawyers were named by decree by the Governor-General of the colonial administration, Alliali had to wait over a year and rely on a favor by his future brother-in-law, Jean Delafosse, to be nominated to the role. Once he was named a defense lawyer, Alliali became an ardent defender of PDCI members.

== Parliament and diplomat ==
In 1957, Alliali was elected to the National Assembly. In 1959, the parliament elected Alliali Vice-President of the Assembly for the First Legislature. As chairman of the Constitutional Commission, Alliali participated in the drafting of the country's 1959 Constitution.

At the same time, Alliali was elected to the Senate of the French Community from 1958 to 1961.

On 22 March 1961, Alliali was named the first Ambassador of Côte d'Ivoire to France.

== In government ==
In February 1963, President Félix Houphouët-Boigny named Alliali Deputy Minister of Foreign Affairs, placing him directly under the authority of the Head of State. In this post, Alliali was instrumental in the foundation of a number of institutions, including Air Afrique in 1961, the Organisation of African Unity in 1963, and the African Development Bank in 1964.

In January 1966, Alliali was named Keeper of the Seals and Minister of Justice in Houphouët-Boigny's fourth government, a post he would hold for seventeen years until 1983. Alliali would serve as a Minister of State in the thirteenth and fourteenth Houphouët-Boigny governments, until his retirement in October 1989.

== Local and internal politics ==
Camille Alliali was elected Mayor of his home town of Toumodi in 1980.

An active member of the Executive Committee of the Parti démocratique de Côte d'Ivoire (PDCI-RDA), Alliali was considered a possible successor to President Félix Houphouët-Boigny, in the early 1980s. In 2010, Alliali served as a mediator between Henri Konan Bédié and Charles Konan Banny, two rival candidates for the PDCI in the presidential election. In 2023, Camille Alliali was elevated to the rank of Commander of the Order of Merit of Justice and Human Rights.
