= Shinjuku Gyo-en =

National garden in Tokyo, Japan

- Shinjuku Gyoen National Garden
- 新宿御苑
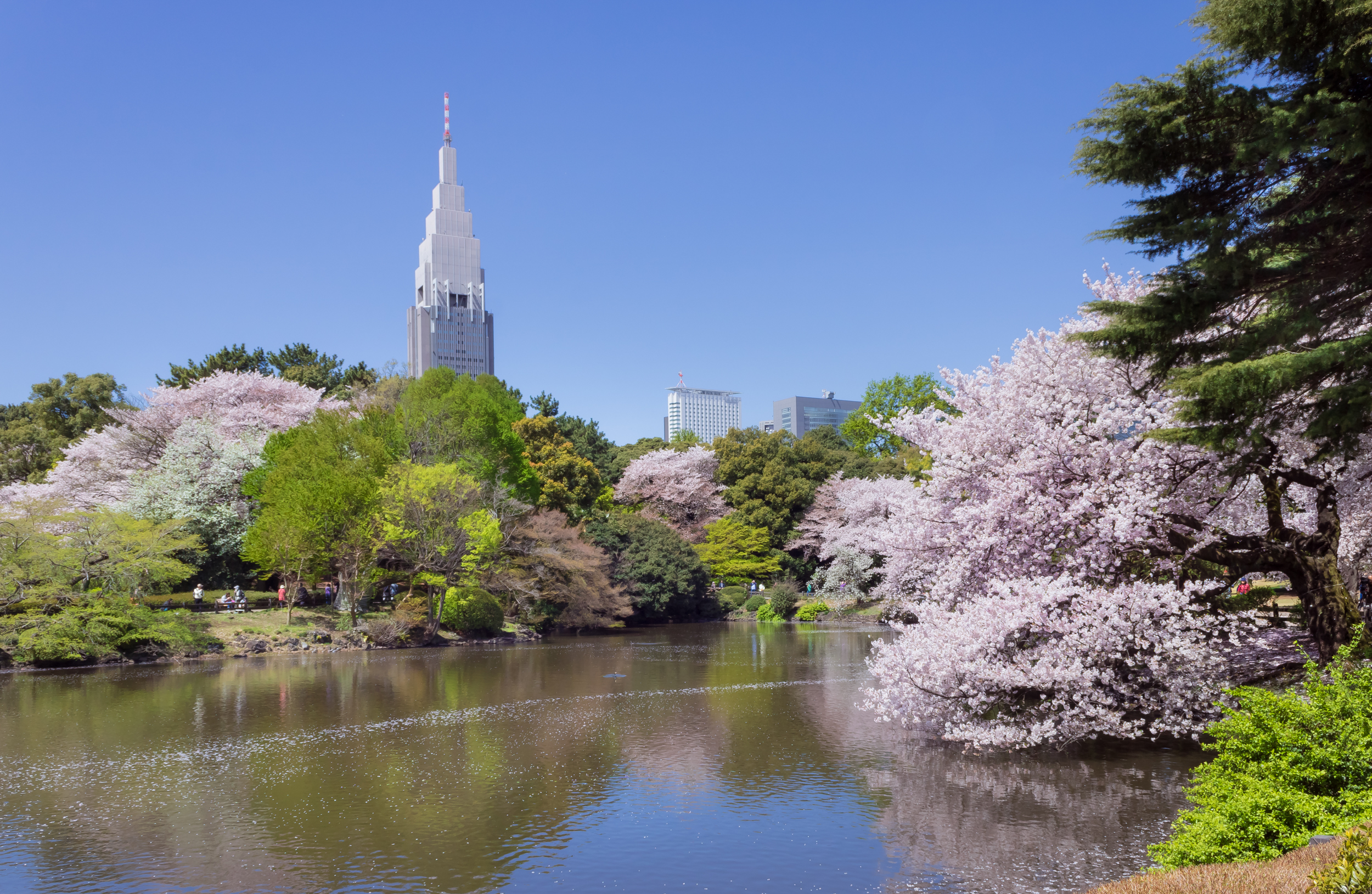

- Map of the Shinjuku Gyo-en
- Type: National garden
- Location: Shinjuku and Shibuya, Tokyo, Japan
- Coordinates: 35.685°N 139.710°E
- Area: 58.3 ha (144 acres)
- Operator: Ministry of the Environment, Japan
- Open: May 1906
- Status: Open
- Plants: 20,000 trees; 1,500 subtropical and tropical plants
- Website: www.env.go.jp/garden/shinjukugyoen

Shinjuku Gyo-en (新宿御苑, literally 'Shinjuku Imperial Garden') or Shinjuku Gyoen National Garden is a large public garden in Shinjuku and Shibuya, Tokyo, Japan. Originally a residence of the Naitō family in the Edo period, it later became a garden under the management of Japan Imperial Household Agency and is now a national garden under the jurisdiction of the Ministry of the Environment.

== History ==
The shōgun Tokugawa Ieyasu bequeathed land in this area to a Naitō daimyō (feudal lord) in 1590 for his residence in Edo. The Naitō family completed a garden here in 1772. In 1872, following the Meiji Restoration, the house and its grounds were converted into an experimental agricultural centre, the Naito Shinjuku Experimental Station. It became the Shinjuku Imperial Botanical Garden in 1879. In 1901, head of the garden Hayato Fukuba asked landscape architect Henry Martinet of the École nationale supérieure d'horticulture in Versailles to remodel the botanical garden into a landscape garden, and Shinjuku Imperial Garden (Shinjuku Gyoen), with its present layout, was opened in May 1906 with the Emperor Meiji in attendance.

Most of the garden was burnt and greatly damaged by air raids in 1945, in the later stages of World War II, except for the Taiwan Pavilion. After the war, jurisdiction over the garden, plus the Tokyo Imperial Palace Outer Garden and the Kyoto Imperial Garden, was transferred to the Ministry of Health and Welfare (now the Ministry of Health, Labour and Welfare), and the garden was rebuilt. It reopened to the public on 21 May 1949 as Shinjuku Gyoen National Garden. Jurisdiction was transferred to the Environment Agency when it formed in 1971, then to the Ministry of the Environment when it succeeded the agency in 2001, where it remains.

The 1989 state funeral rites of emperor Hirohito were held in the garden, before he was taken for burial at the Musashi Imperial Graveyard.

== Features ==
The garden, which is 58.3 hectares in area with a circumference of 3.5 km, blends three distinct styles: a French Formal and English Landscape in the north and a Japanese traditional garden in the south. A traditional Japanese tea house is in the gardens. The garden is a favourite hanami (cherry-blossom viewing) spot, and large crowds can be present during cherry blossom season.

The garden has more than 20,000 trees, including approximately 1,500 cherry trees, which bloom from late March (Shidare or Weeping Cherry) to early April (Somei or Tokyo Cherry), and on to late April (Kanzan Cherry). Other trees include majestic Himalayan cedars, which soar above the rest of the trees in the garden, tulip trees, cypresses, and plane trees, which were first planted in Japan in the Imperial Gardens.

Horticulture work has been done in the garden greenhouses since 1892. The present greenhouse, built in the 1950s, has over 1,700 tropical and subtropical plant species on permanent display.

== Access ==
The garden has three access gates: Shinjuku Gate, Okido Gate, and Sendagaya Gate. Shinjuku Gyoen is open from 9:00 until 17:30 (mid-March until end of September; October–mid-March: until 16:00; July–late August: 18:30). On Mondays the garden is closed, except during the cherry blossom and chrysanthemum seasons: late March–late April, and first half of November respectively, when the garden is open seven days a week. If Monday is a public holiday, then closed the following day. During cherry blossom, prior reservations are required for several dates. The greenhouse is open from 9:30 until 17:00 (mid-March until end of September; October–mid-March: until 15:30; July–late August: 18:00).

The garden is a short walk from Shinjuku-gyoemmae Station on the Marunouchi Line and from Sendagaya Station on the Chūō-Sōbu Line. It is on the Tokyo Metro Fukutoshin Line near Shinjuku-sanchōme Station. It is a four-minute walk from exit C1 of that station.

== In popular culture ==
In Yasunari Kawabata's The Sound of the Mountain, Shingo declares, "You can stretch out. It's like getting out of Japan - I wouldn't have dreamed that there was a place like this right in the middle of Tokyo."

It is the setting of the 2013 anime film The Garden of Words.

== Gallery ==
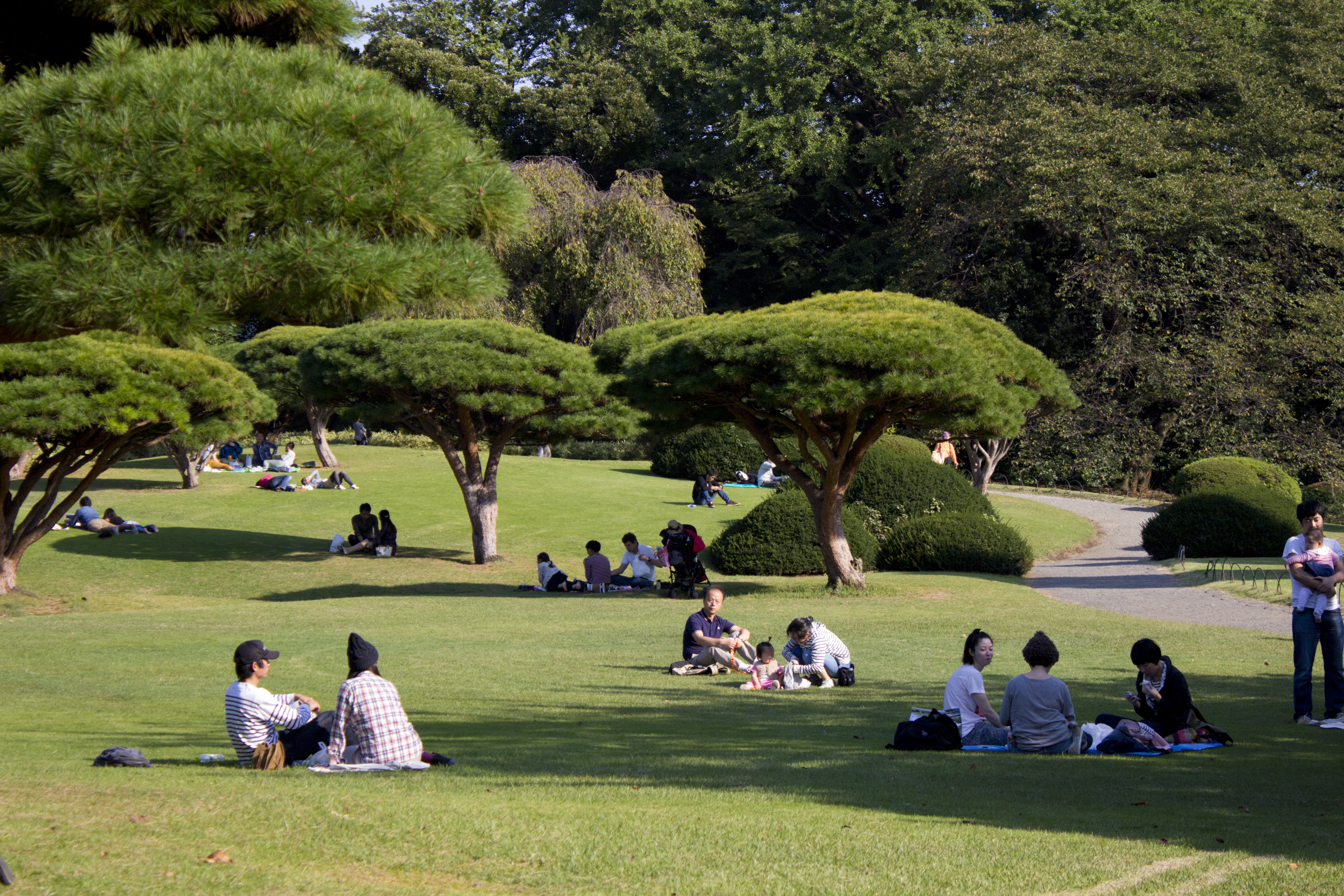
Shinjuku Gyo-en

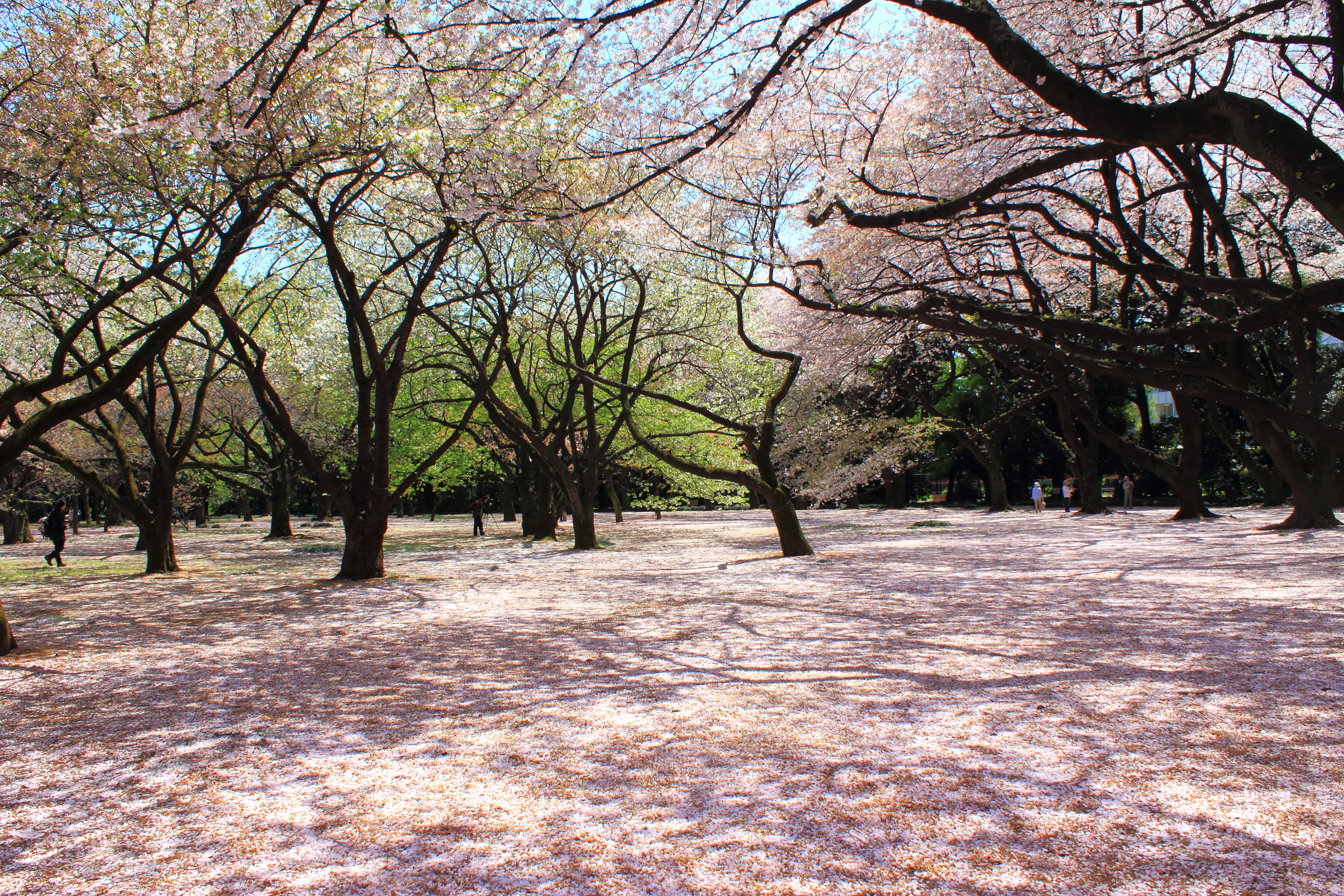
Cherry blossom in Shinjuku Gyo-en

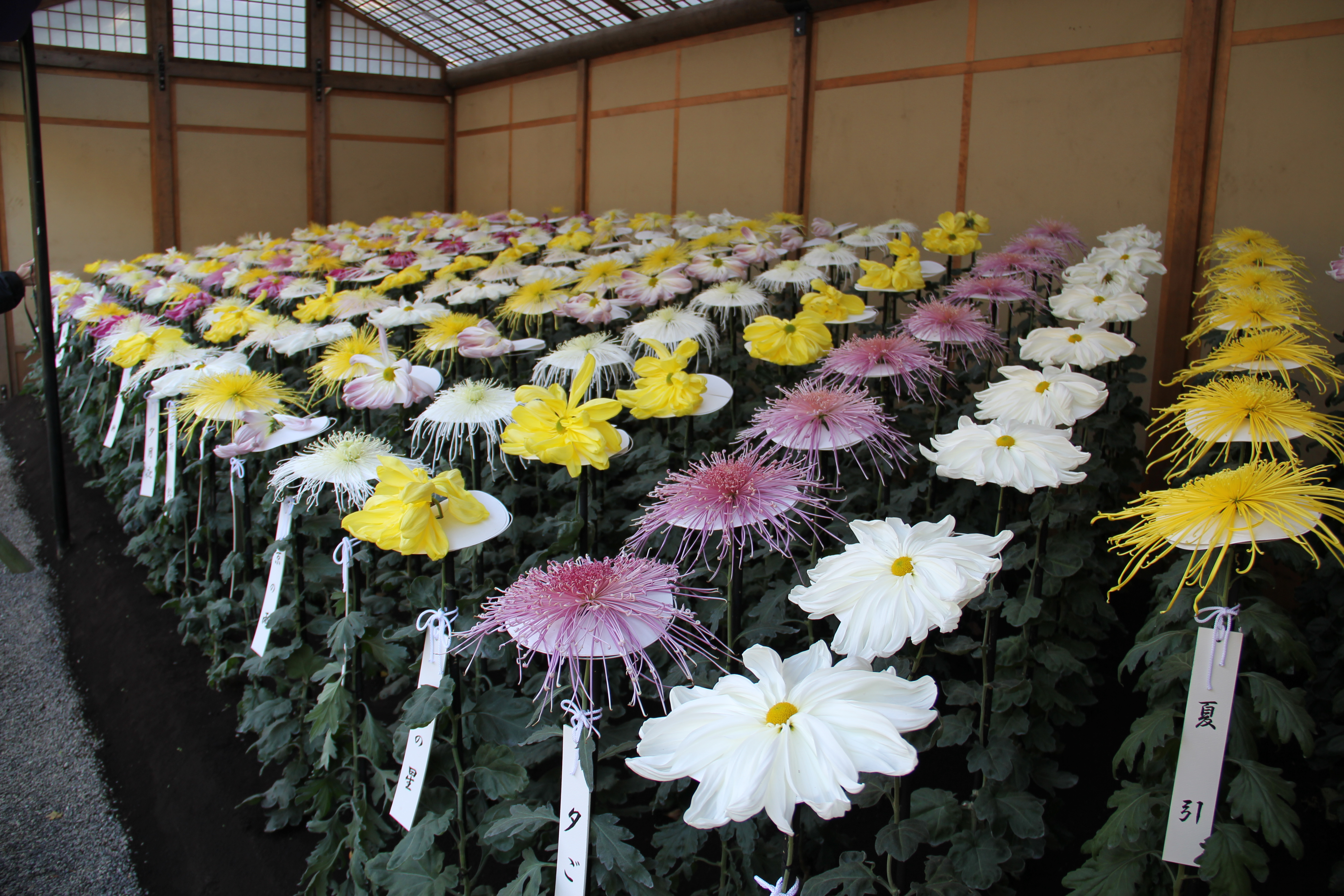
Chrysanthemum flower exhibition, 2010

A few scenes inside the garden in early spring 2023

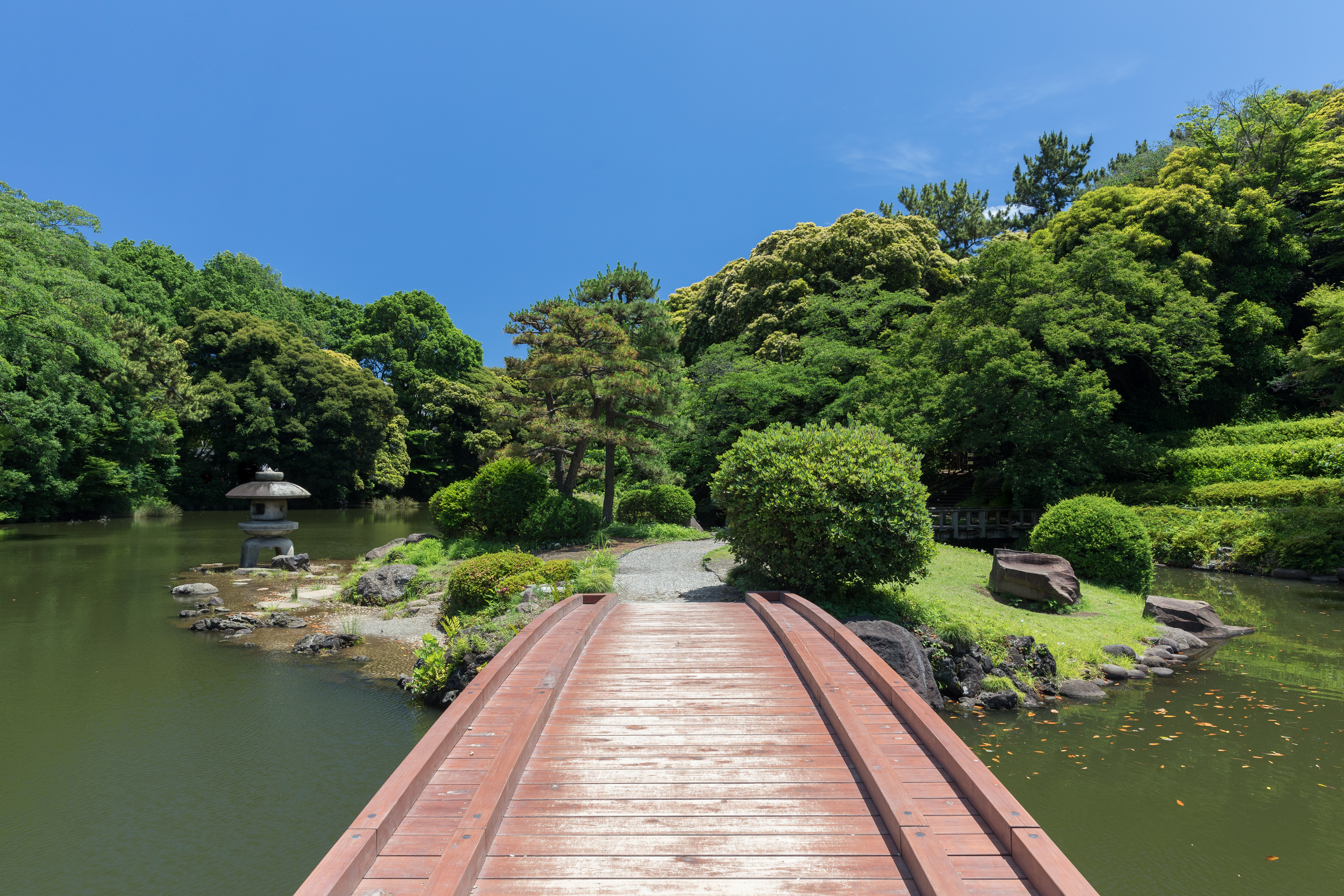
Wooden footbridge in Shinjuku Gyo-en

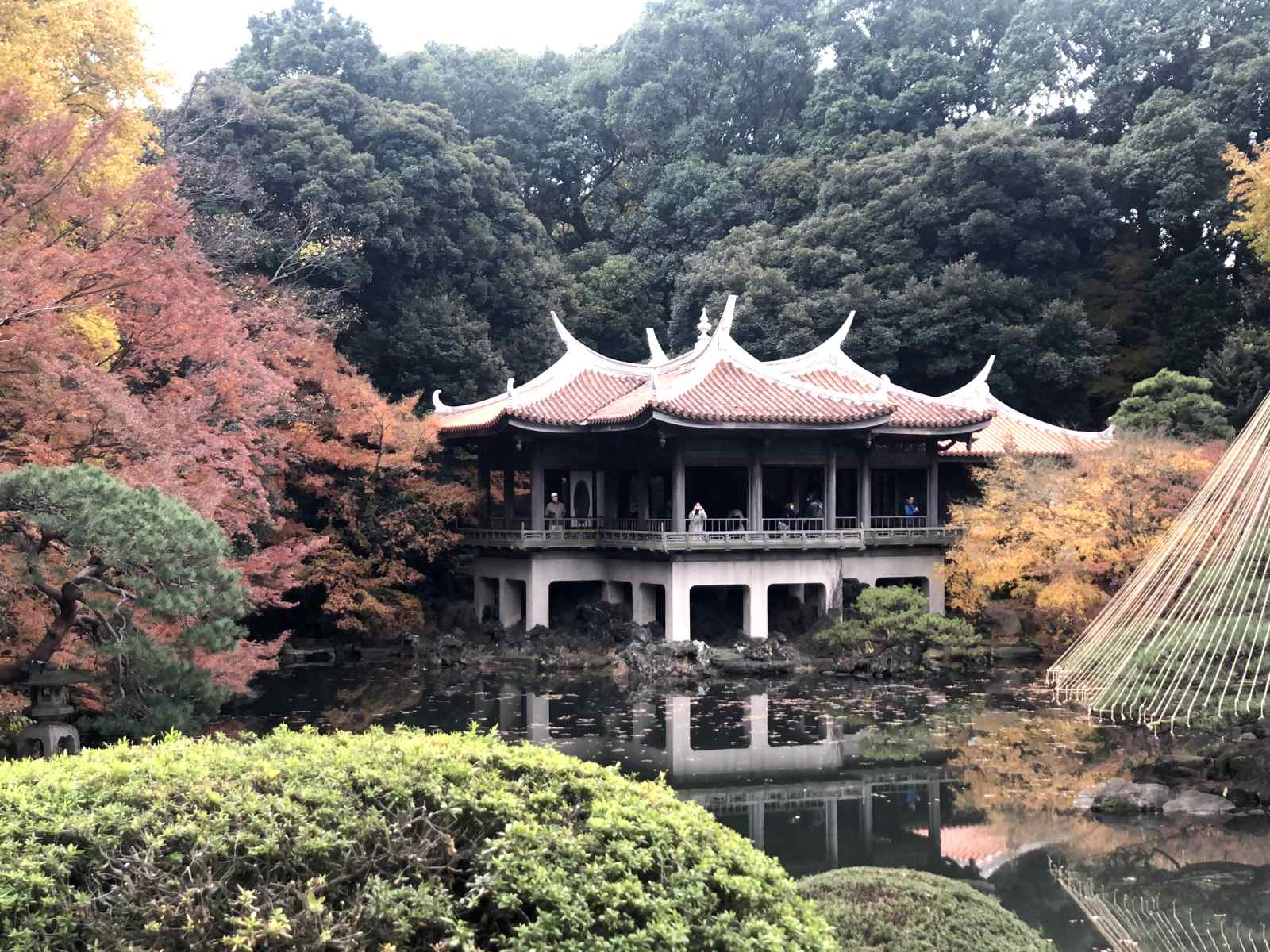
Shinjuku Gyo-en in fall
