= Your Name =

2016 film by Makoto Shinkai

- Theatrical release poster

Japanese name
- Kanji: 君の名は。
Transcriptions
- Revised Hepburn: Kimi no Na wa
- Directed by: Makoto Shinkai
- Written by: Makoto Shinkai
- Produced by: Kōichirō Itō; Katsuhiro Takei; Genki Kawamura
- Starring: Ryunosuke Kamiki; Mone Kamishiraishi; Ryo Narita; Aoi Yūki; Nobunaga Shimazaki; Kaito Ishikawa; Kanon Tani; Masami Nagasawa; Etsuko Ichihara
- Cinematography: Makoto Shinkai
- Edited by: Makoto Shinkai
- Music by: Radwimps
- Production company: CoMix Wave Films
- Distributed by: Toho
- Release dates: July 3, 2016 (Anime Expo); August 26, 2016 (Japan)
- Running time: 107 minutes
- Country: Japan
- Language: Japanese
- Budget: ¥750 million (≈US$7.5 million) (Note: The film had a production budget of ¥450 million (≈US$4.5 million). Advertisement costs brought the total budget to ¥750 million.)
- Box office: US$408.3 million

Your Name (Note: Sometimes stylized as Your Name. or your name.) (Japanese: 君の名は。, Hepburn: Kimi no Na wa; lit. 'Your Name is...') is a 2016 Japanese animated romantic fantasy film written and directed by Makoto Shinkai, produced by CoMix Wave Films, and distributed by Toho. The first installment of what critics deem Shinkai's "disaster trilogy" (with 2019's Weathering with You and 2022's Suzume), themed by the frequency of natural disasters in Japan, the film follows high school students Taki Tachibana and Mitsuha Miyamizu, who suddenly begin to swap bodies despite never having met, creating chaos in each other's lives.

The film features the voices of Ryunosuke Kamiki as Taki and Mone Kamishiraishi as Mitsuha, with animation direction by Masashi Ando, character design by Masayoshi Tanaka, and its orchestral score and soundtrack composed by the rock band Radwimps. A light novel of the same name, also written by Shinkai, was published a month prior to its release.

Your Name premiered at the 2016 Anime Expo in Los Angeles on July 3, 2016, and was theatrically released in Japan on August 26, 2016; it was released internationally by several distributors in 2017. The film received widespread critical acclaim for its story, animation, music, visuals, and emotional weight. Until it was surpassed by Demon Slayer: Kimetsu no Yaiba – The Movie: Mugen Train in 2020, Your Name was the highest-grossing Japanese film of all time, grossing US$400 million worldwide following re-release, breaking numerous box office records and dethroning Spirited Away. It received several accolades, including Best Animated Feature at the 2016 Los Angeles Film Critics Association Awards, the 49th Sitges Film Festival, and the 71st Mainichi Film Awards; it was also nominated for the Japan Academy Film Prize for Animation of the Year.

A live-action remake is in development by Paramount Pictures and Bad Robot.

== Plot ==
Mitsuha Miyamizu is a high school student in Itomori, (Note: 糸守; lit. 'thread guard') a rural town in Gifu. Bored with her provincial life, she wishes to be reborn as a boy in Tokyo. Soon, she begins intermittently switching bodies with Taki Tachibana, a high school student and part-time waiter from Tokyo's Shinjuku ward. On certain days, they awaken in each other's bodies and must live the entire day as the other, reverting to their own bodies during sleep. They set rules for sharing their bodies, communicating via writing on paper, their phones, and their skin. In each other's bodies, Mitsuha sets Taki on a date with his coworker Miki Okudera; Taki, meanwhile, increases Mitsuha's popularity at school, and accompanies her grandmother Hitoha and younger sister Yotsuha to a shrine in the Goshintai (Note: 御神体; lit. 'body of sovereign god') crater. He offers kuchikamizake fermented with Mitsuha's saliva. Hitoha explains God's sovereignty over both time and the connections between humans. Mitsuha informs Taki that Comet 279P/Tiamat is expected to pass nearest to Earth on the day of the autumn festival. Taki, in his own body, goes on the date with Okudera the next day. While she enjoys it, she deduces Taki's preoccupations with someone else through his unusual behavior. As the two realize their mutual feelings for each other, Taki attempts and fails to call Mitsuha. The body-switching stops inexplicably.

Taki, Okudera, and his classmate Tsukasa Fujii travel to Hida to search for Mitsuha. Unfamiliar with her town's name, Taki sketches it from memory. A Takayama ramen-shop owner, recognizing Itomori, offers to take them there. They discover its ruins, almost entirely decimated by Tiamat's fragments. Simultaneously, Mitsuha's messages vanish from Taki's phone. The comet having passed in 2013, Taki realizes that Mitsuha has been separated from him by three years, since he lived in 2016. At Hida City Library, the three discover that the Miyamizus and their friends were among its 500 fatalities. Taki begins to lose his memories of Mitsuha.

Recalling Hitoha's words about time and its ability to tangle and unravel, Taki rushes to Goshintai to imbibe Mitsuha's kuchikamizake. Upon doing so, he faints, undergoing a vision chronicling much of her life, realizing that she once came to Tokyo to find him. Although he could not recognize Mitsuha at the time, she passed her kumihimo braid onto him, which he has worn as a lucky bracelet ever since. He awakens in Mitsuha's body on the morning of the festival. Hitoha undergoes an epiphany upon observing "Mitsuha's" uncharacteristic behavior; speaking directly to Taki, she reveals that the body-switching has been in their family for centuries. Taki enlists Mitsuha's friends Sayaka and Tessie to force an evacuation prior to Tiamat's impact by destroying Itomori's substation and hijacking its emergency broadcast system. He returns to the shrine, where Mitsuha has awakened in his own body. At twilight, (Note: Referred to in the film as "magic hour" or "kataware-doki", neologized from "kawatare-doki", an old Japanese word meaning "twilight;" a similar archaic or poetic word in English is crepuscule. "Kawatare" (彼は誰) literally means "Who is he/she?"; "kataware" is homophonic with a word meaning "one part of a couple; fragment" (片割れ). Old Japanese superstition says all manners of supernatural occurrences are possible at twilight.) their timelines intersect, allowing them to meet in person. Taki returns Mitsuha's braid; as they attempt to write their names on each other's palms, night falls before Mitsuha can write hers.

Returning to Itomori, Mitsuha finds that the mayor, her estranged father Toshiki, had instructed residents to stay put. She persuades him to order an evacuation instead. Beginning to forget Taki, she discovers that he wrote "I love you" on her hand instead of his name. Taki awakens in his own time, without memory of Mitsuha.

Five years later, Taki has graduated from university; with persistent melancholy, he struggles with job searching. He has continuously fixated on the Itomori meteor strike, in which a last-minute evacuation order miraculously saved the majority of Itomori's residents. Eventually, on April 8, 2022, he glimpses Mitsuha, now a resident in Tokyo, on a parallel JR East train; they race to find each other. On the steps of Suga Shrine, Taki calls out to Mitsuha, and they simultaneously ask for each other's names.

== Characters ==
Taki Tachibana (立花 瀧, Tachibana Taki) (Note: The kanji for "Taki" combines the characters for "water and "dragon". The surname "Tachibana" means "standing flower".)
Voiced by: Ryunosuke Kamiki (Japanese); Michael Sinterniklaas (English)
A seventeen-year-old student in his second year at Jingu High School (Note: The institution is fictional, but is based on the Motomachi High School in Tokyo.) (Note: Taki and Mitsuha's cases are comparable with that of the protagonist of Suzume (2022): Suzume Iwato (岩戸 鈴芽; Iwato Suzume) is likewise seventeen and lives in a provincial town; she also attends high school.) in the Tokyo Metropolis; he was born on December 1, 1998 (exactly three years after Mitsuha). He is a talented sketch-artist and aspiring architect, collecting numerous books on the subject. Impulsive, straightforward, and belligerent (when Mitsuha first awakens in his body, his cheek is bandaged, owing to his penchant for quarreling), he is nevertheless well-meaning and considerate, and holds to a rigid system of moral principles. Taki often spends time with Okudera and his best friends Takagi and Tsukasa; the four serve part-time as waiters at Il Giardino delle Parole, (Note: The Italian title of Shinkai's 2013 film The Garden of Words. It is based on the Café La Bohème, which occupies its address in the real world. This easter egg was implemented by one of the film's environmental artists.) an Italian restaurant in Shinjuku. Taki lives with his father, (Note: The character's name is unknown. They live together in room 608 on the sixth floor of an apartment building in Shinjuku.) who works in Kasumigaseki; Shinkai stated that he thinks "his mother (Note: Taki's mother does not appear in the film; neither is she mentioned at any point during the film or its light novelizations.) divorced his father a few years ago".
A running gag throughout the film has Taki awakening then realizing he has swapped bodies with Mitsuha that day. He immediately begins to fondle "his" breasts in amazement, only stopping once Yotsuha sees "her". Mitsuha herself condemns Taki's perversions upon their first physical acquaintance during the twilight hour.
By the end of the film, Taki, who has an architectural degree, searches for employment opportunities, specializing in disaster prevention.
Taki (as an architecture student) would later cameo in Shinkai's next film Weathering with You alongside his paternal grandmother Fumi Tachibana (who does not appear in Your Name) during an Obon rite for the soul of his paternal grandfather (Fumi's late husband). (Note: It is implied in the Weathering with You light novel (and subsequently confirmed by Makoto Shinkai) that Taki and Mitsuha married by 2024: that is to say, before the epilogue of Weathering with You.)
Mitsuha Miyamizu (宮水 三葉, Miyamizu Mitsuha) (Note: The name "Mitsuha" literally translates to "three leaves." She was named as such by her parents (in the film, her mother; in the light novel, her father) in line with the nomenclaturial tradition of her grandmother and mother. From Hitoha onward, the Miyamizus are named via "leaves", with which a number (in the kun reading) denotes the ordinality of their geniture: "Hitoha" = one leaf; "Futaba" = two leaves; "Mitsuha" = three leaves; "Yotsuha" = four leaves. The surname "Miyamizu" translates to "shrine-water".)
Voiced by: Mone Kamishiraishi (Japanese); Stephanie Sheh (English)
A seventeen-year-old student in her second year at Itomori High School; she was born on December 1, 1995. Chronologically, Mitsuha is exactly three years older than Taki. Interested in fashion, food, drink, "cute things" (such as hedgehogs), and the latest vogue, she feels inhibited by Itomori's rural setting, where she was born and has lived for all her life. Mitsuha tends to elaborately tie her hair through a crimson kumihimo braid she wove (symbolizing the red thread of fate). (Note: As Mitsuha would later pass on this braid to Taki, Taki wears the same braid as a bracelet on his right arm, being his good-luck charm for most of the film. Since Taki does not know how to arrange her trademark plait, he instead ties a simple ponytail when possessing her body.) When switching bodies with Taki, she forbids him from showering, touching, or looking at her body.
Being practitioners of the Shinto religion, Mitsuha and her sister Yotsuha serve as miko at Miyamizu Shrine. Following the death of their mother Futaba (whom she greatly resembles), their father Toshiki, horrified by the event, abandoned the shrine to pursue politics, eventually becoming the town's mayor. Owing to his temperament, the sisters refused to live with him, instead moving in with their maternal grandmother Hitoha.
Demure, affectionate, straightforward, idealistic, and sometimes stubborn, she yearns for a metropolitan life in Tokyo and to avoid inevitably encountering Toshiki. She resents her liturgical role, which notably includes the ancient tradition of creating kuchikamizake. Its production, which has one chew rice then expectorate it for fermentation, attracts much derision from both classmates and other residents. Notably, Mitsuha's speech is marked with a lilting accent and a lighter form of the Mino dialect (Note: This dialect is nevertheless reasonably mutually intelligible with Standard Japanese.) (as with much of her fellow Itomori residents); while possessing Taki's body, he insists that she speak hyōjungo (Standard Japanese). When Taki possesses her body, he attempts to learn her native tongue.
Her birthday contradicts the film's setting that she is seventeen in the summer of her second year in high school; (Note: Taki and Mitsuha's cases are comparable with that of the protagonist of Suzume (2022): Suzume Iwato (岩戸 鈴芽; Iwato Suzume) is likewise seventeen and lives in a provincial town; she also attends high school.) Shinkai stated: "In their mind, they both kind of assumed that they were both born on December 1."
Mitsuha would later cameo in Shinkai's next film Weathering with You as a jewelry saleswoman at a shop in LUMINE, a mall in Shinjuku. (Note: It was implied in the Weathering with You light novel (and subsequently confirmed by Makoto Shinkai) that Taki and Mitsuha married by 2024: that is to say, before the epilogue of Weathering with You. She would later present her kumihimo braid to Taki's grandmother Fumi upon their wedding.)
Katsuhiko "Tessie" Teshigawara (勅使河原 克彦, Teshigawara Katsuhiko)
Voiced by: Ryo Narita (Japanese); Kyle Hebert (English)
Mitsuha's classmate, nicknamed "Tessie" ("Tesshi" in the English dub); as of 2013, he is seventeen (born January 18, 1996). (Note: From the list of Tiamat comet victims in Itomori in the middle of the film.) He is infatuated with Mitsuha. The son of the president of the local Teshigawara Construction company, Tessie is a frequent reader of Mu, a monthly periodical devoted to the occult and paranormal. He is interested in mechanics and engineering.
Tessie is deeply ambivalent toward Itomori. In the manga, he says: "It makes me want to destroy it all, leaving only beautiful memories." He initiates measures to improve the town's situation from his own perspective, (Note: For example, upon hearing Mitsuha and Sayaka bemoan the lack of a café in Itomori, Tessie (with Taki, in Mitsuha's body) began to build one for them.) earning him Taki (in Mitsuha's body)'s sympathy.
In the epilogue, Tessie and Sayaka tease each other over their upcoming marriage. The character is namesaken from Teshigawara, a character in the seventh episode of Shinkai's 2014 novelization of The Garden of Words.
Along with Sayaka, he has a cameo in Weathering with You.
Sayaka Natori (名取 早耶香, Natori Sayaka)
Voiced by: Aoi Yūki (Japanese); Cassandra Lee Morris (English)
Mitsuha's classmate and best friend; as of 2013, she is seventeen (born February 1, 1996). Calm yet volatile, she harbors a crush on Tessie. Sayaka is part of the school's radio broadcasting club: later in the film, she is tasked by Taki (in Mitsuha's body) and Tessie with broadcasting the false emergency evacuation alert. Her elder sister, who works at the town hall, briefly appears in the film.
Like Tessie, Sayaka is named after a character in the seventh episode of Shinkai's 2014 novelization of The Garden of Words.
Along with him, she has a cameo in Weathering with You.
Tsukasa Fujii (藤井 司, Fujii Tsukasa)
Voiced by: Nobunaga Shimazaki (Japanese); Ben Pronsky (English)
Taki's classmate and best friend of both him and Takagi; as of 2016, he is seventeen (born October 1, 1999). Loyal and phlegmatic, he is, like them, interested in architecture and also serves part-time at Il Giardino delle Parole. Tsukasa worries about Taki whenever Mitsuha inhabits his body.
In his last appearance toward the end of the film, he is seen wearing a ring on his left hand. Upon inquiry, Shinkai commented: "It's just a backstory, but I believe Tsukasa is engaged to Okudera."
He would later confirm that Tsukasa and Okudera married by the epilogue; the two have an age gap of seven years. (Note: Upon his graduation from high school (with high marks), Tsukasa began work as a florist.)
Shinta Takagi (高木 真太, Takagi Shinta) (Note: Takagi is usually referred to by his surname.)
Voiced by: Kaito Ishikawa (Japanese); Ray Chase (English)
Taki and Tsukasa's classmate and best friend; as of 2016, he is seventeen (born 1998 or 1999). Crisp and optimistic, he has a well-built figure with an athletic appearance. Like his dear friends, he is an aspiring architect. Along with them, he has a part-time job at Il Giardino delle Parole. He is the most extroverted of the trio.
Miki Okudera (奥寺 ミキ, Okudera Miki) (Note: Okudera is usually referred to by her surname.)
Voiced by: Masami Nagasawa (Japanese); Laura Post (English)
A student at the University of Tokyo and a close friend and coworker (at Il Giardino delle Parole) of Taki's. As of 2016, she is twenty-four (born January 22, 1992). Before body-switching with Mitsuha, Taki originally had a crush on Okudera. Fashionable, extroverted, and admired for her appearance, she is popular with male waiters. She develops closer feelings for Taki when Mitsuha inhabits his body. Okudera is a smoker: Tsukasa discovers this as they spend a night together while accompanying Taki on his search for Mitsuha. She is commonly referred to as Okudera-senpai ("Miss Okudera" in the English dub) by her colleagues.
Upon her long-awaited reunion with Taki in 2021, she is seen wearing an engagement ring, and informs him of her upcoming wedding. According to Shinkai: "It's just a backstory, but I believe that Tsukasa is engaged to Okudera." In the light novel, Okudera works (as of that point) at the Chiba branch of an apparel manufacturer.
He would later confirm that Tsukasa and Okudera married by the epilogue; the two have an age gap of seven years.
Hitoha Miyamizu (宮水 一葉, Miyamizu Hitoha)
Voiced by: Etsuko Ichihara (Japanese); Glynis Ellis (English)
The abbess and matriarch of Miyamizu Shrine and maternal grandmother to Mitsuha and Yotsuha; as of 2013, she is 82 (born March 4, 1931). Her principal family tradition is kumihimo (thread-weaving). She educates her grandchildren in the history, theology, and traditions of the shrine and the Shinto faith.
Hitoha is still alive as of 2021, according to the manga.
Yotsuha Miyamizu (宮水 四葉, Miyamizu Yotsuha)
Voiced by: Kanon Tani (Japanese); Catie Harvey (English)
Mitsuha's ebullient younger sister; as of 2013, she is nine (born July 2, 2004) and in fourth grade. Yotsuha assists her grandmother and sister in preserving family tradition at Miyamizu Shrine, where the sisters participate in producing kumihimo and kuchikamizake. She finds Mitsuha suspicious and erratic, yet nevertheless supports and loves her unconditionally. At the end of the film, Yotsuha is seen attending high school.
She has a cameo in the film Weathering with You.
Toshiki Miyamizu (né Mizoguchi) (宮水 俊樹; 溝口 俊樹, Miyamizu Toshiki; Mizoguchi Toshiki) (Note: During his marriage to Futaba, owing to local religious custom, Toshiki assumed his wife's surname.)
Voiced by: Masaki Terasoma (Japanese); Scott Williams (English)
The estranged father of the sisters Miyamizu and widower of Futaba; as of 2013, he is 53 and campaigning for re-election. A retired folklorist and anthropologist who originally came to Itomori for research (having abated his career and prearranged engagement in order to marry Futaba), he carries a jaded, draconic countenance owing to the loss of his wife. Horrified by how the town's residents regarded her as a mere miko, Toshiki renounced the priesthood following her death, subsequently capitalizing on the prestige of the Miyamizu clan to be elected town mayor two years later.
He was born in Nara in 1959, and formerly lived and worked in Kyoto.
Futaba Miyamizu (宮水 二葉, Miyamizu Futaba)
Voiced by: Sayaka Ohara (Japanese); Michelle Ruff (English)
Mitsuha and Yotsuha's mother, Toshiki's wife, and only child of Hitoha; she was a priestess at Miyamizu Shrine. She appears in a scene where Taki undergoes a vision of much of Mitsuha's life. Prior to the events of the film, Futaba succumbed to severe illness, aged thirty-six.
She was born in Itomori in 1971 and died there in 2007.
Yukari Yukino (雪野 百香里, Yukino Yukari) (Note: Listed in the credits and named in the novelization as "Yuki-chan Sensei.")
Voiced by: Kana Hanazawa (Japanese); Katy Vaughn (English) (Note: In the English dub of The Garden of Words, Yukino is voiced by Maggie Flecknoe. Kana Hanazawa reprises this role from that film's original Japanese version.)
An introspective teacher of Classical Japanese at Itomori High School specializing in literature and poetry; as of 2013, she is 27 (born February 27, 1986). She teaches the class about the word "kataware-doki". (Note: Neologized from "kawatare-doki", an old Japanese word meaning "twilight'" a similar archaic or poetic word in English is crepuscule. "Kawatare" (彼は誰) literally means "Who is he/she?"; "kataware" is homophonic with a word meaning "one part of a couple; fragment" (片割れ). Old Japanese superstition says all manners of supernatural occurrence are possible at twilight.) Yukari previously appeared in Shinkai's film The Garden of Words. (Note: The protagonist of the same film, Takao Akizuki (秋月 孝雄, Akizuki Takao) also features in Your Name as a silent cameo appearance, albeit for a few frames.)
In September 2013, Yukari actually lived in Tokyo (as seen in The Garden of Words) and taught in a local high school; she would later continue educating while moving back to her hometown, Imabari, Ehime. It is, according to Shinkai, "up to the viewer's imagination" as to why she was seen in Itomori.

== Production ==
Makoto Shinkai conceived the film's plot after his July 2011 visit to the fishing village of Yuriage in Natori, following the 2011 Tōhoku earthquake and tsunami. Reflecting on the devastation, he thought: "this could have been my town." Subsequently, he conceived an idea for a film where the positions of the residents of Yuriage would be swapped with those of the viewers. During his visit, Shinkai produced various sketches, some of which have been publicly exhibited.

Shinkai delivered his initial film proposal to Toho on September 14, 2014, with the original title of Yume to Shiriseba (夢と知りせば, If I Knew It Were a Dream), derived from a verse in a waka attributed to Ono no Komachi. Its title was later changed to Kimi no Musubime (きみの結びめ, Your Connection) and Kimi wa Kono Sekai no Hanbun (きみはこの世界のはんぶん, You Are Half of This World) before being finalized as Kimi no Na wa (lit. 'Your Name is...'). On December 31, 2014, Shinkai announced that he was writing the film's storyboard.

Inspiration for the plot was derived from various literary works, including Shūzō Oshimi's Inside Mari, Rumiko Takahashi's Ranma ½, the Heian period tale Torikaebaya Monogatari, and Greg Egan's short story The Safe-Deposit Box. Shinkai also cited influence from Christopher Nolan's Interstellar (2014). Meanwhile, Shinkai and his team scrutinized their earlier work for reference, such as Crossroads, a television advertisement for Z-kai (2014), and 5 Centimeters per Second (2007).

While the town of Itomori, one of the film's principal settings, is fictitious, the film drew inspirations from real-life locations that provided a backdrop for the town. These include the city of Hida and its library.

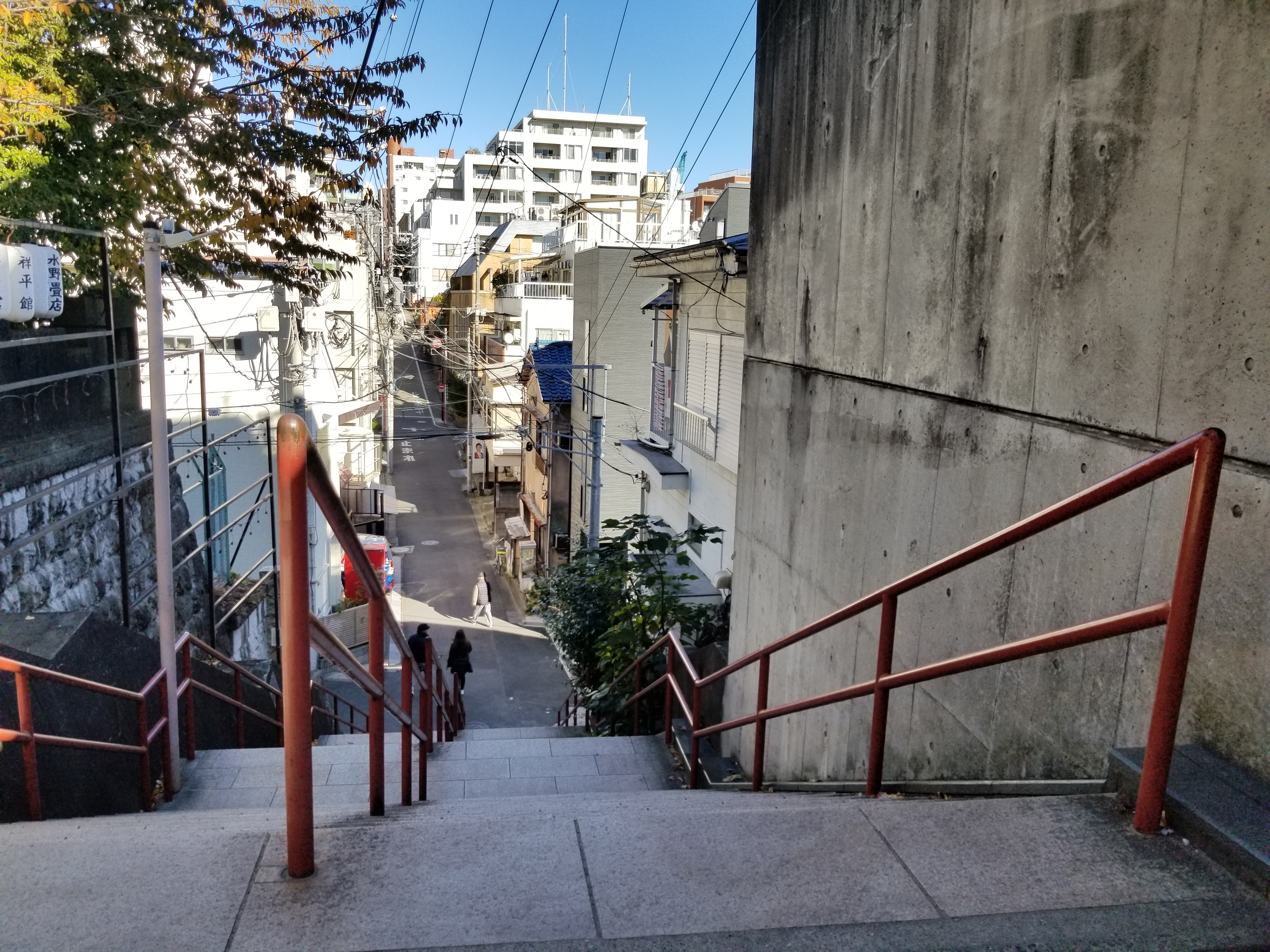
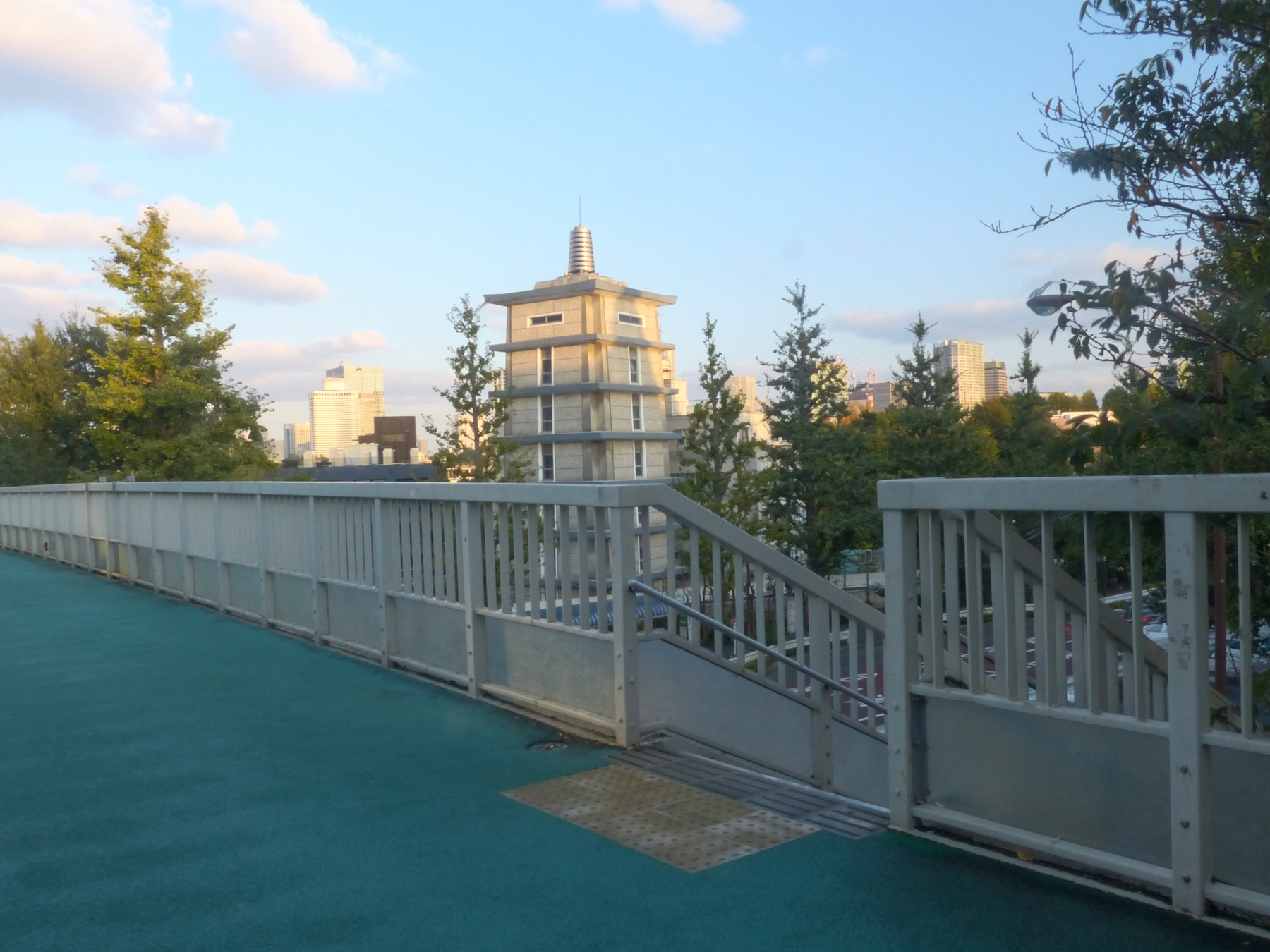
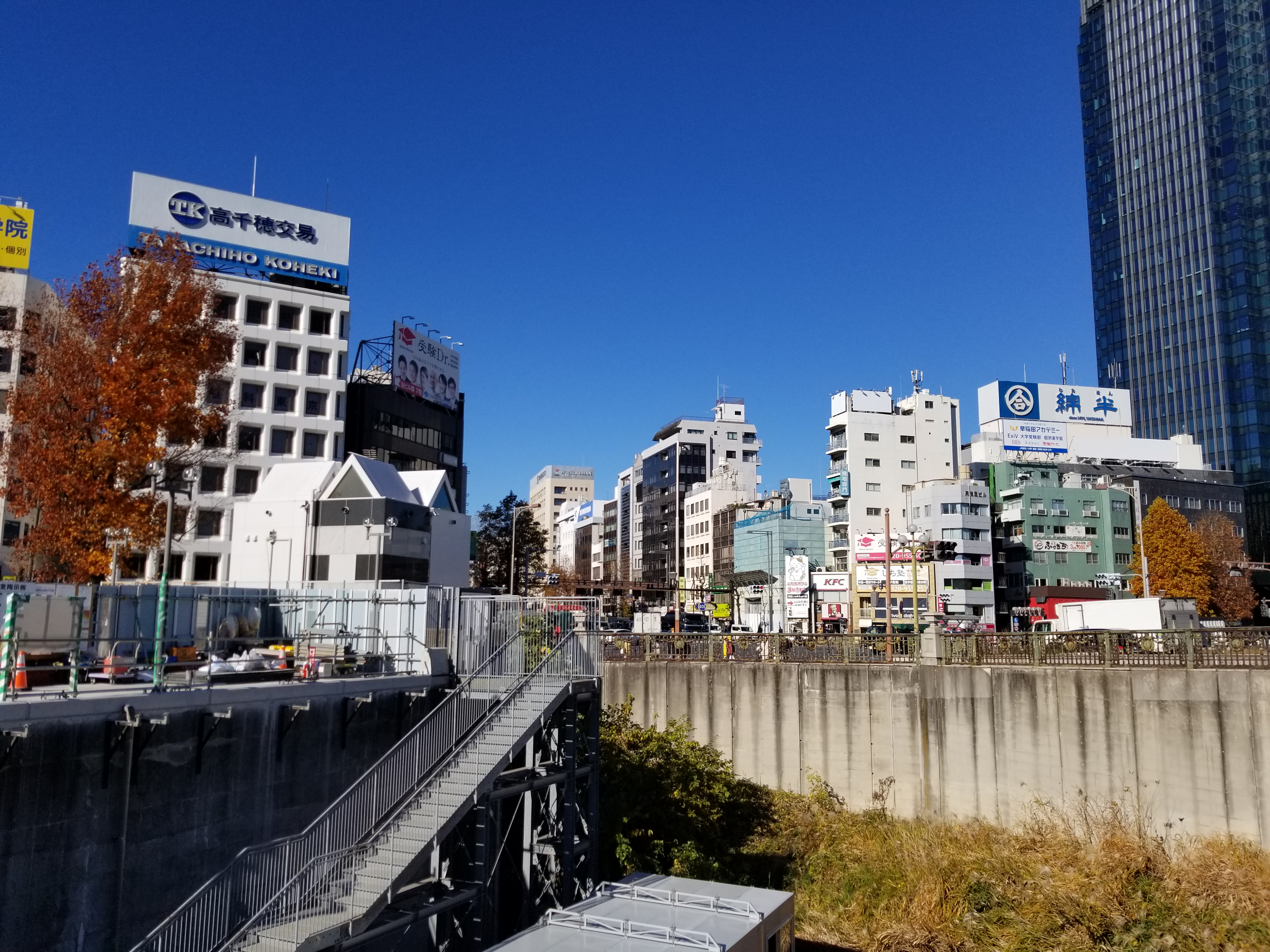
Many locations in Your Name were based on real-life locations. From left to right: Suga Shrine staircase in Shinjuku, the Shinanomachi Station footbridge, and the view outside of Yotsuya Station.

== Music ==
The score of Your Name was composed by Yojiro Noda, the lead vocalist of the Japanese rock band Radwimps. Shinkai requested him to conceive its incidental music "in a way that the music will [supplement] the dialogue or monologue of the characters". Its soundtrack was well-received by critics and audiences alike and is acknowledged as one of the factors behind the film's commercial success. At the 2016 Newtype Anime Awards, the music was runner-up in its "Best Soundtrack" category, with Zenzenzense being the runner-up in the "Best Theme Song" category.

Aside from various instrumental tracks, Your Name features four songs, recorded in both Japanese and English, performed by Radwimps:

- "Yume Tōrō" (夢灯籠, Yume tōrō; lit. 'Dream lantern')
- "Zenzenzense" (前前前世, Zenzenzense; lit. 'Past-Past-Past Life')
- "Sparkle" (スパークル, Supākuru)
- "Nandemonaiya" (なんでもないや, Nande mo nai ya; lit. 'It's Nothin'') (Note: For this translation, dynamic equivalence is used, as the title of this song is in the Mino dialect, which is comparable to Southern dialects in the United States.)

== Release ==
World map showing countries and regions where Your Name was released theatrically (green)

Your Name premièred at the 2016 Anime Expo convention in Los Angeles on July 3, 2016. It was later released theatrically in Japan on August 26, 2016. The film was released in 92 countries. In order to qualify for the Academy Awards, the film was released for one week (December 2–8, 2016) in Los Angeles.

The film was also screened in Southeast Asian countries. Purple Plan streamed an English- and Chinese-subtitled trailer for the film, premièring the film in Singapore on November 3 and in Malaysia on November 8, with daily screenings onwards. In India, PVR Cinemas released Your Name as the opening film of the "Makoto Shinkai Film Festival" on May 19, 2023. M Pictures released the film on November 10 in Thailand, earning ฿22,996,714 (approximately US$649,056) in four days. In Indonesia, the film distributor Encore Films and cinema chain CGV Blitz announced that they would screen the film, with the former hosting its première on December 7. Pioneer Films screened the film in the Philippines on December 14, where it immediately became the country's highest-grossing animated movie of 2016. In Hong Kong, the film opened on November 11, earning HK$6,149,917 (approximately US$792,806) in three days. The film premièred in Taiwan on October 21, and earned NT$64 million (approximately US$2 million) in its first week while staying in the first position in the box office earnings ranking. By October 31, 2016, the film earned NT$52,909,581 (approximately US$1.666 million) in Taipei alone. It was released in Chinese theatres by Huaxia Film Distribution on December 2, 2016.

On November 24, 2016, Your Name received a limited release in Australian cinemas in both Japanese and English Australian cinemas through Madman Entertainment. Madman Entertainment also released the film in New Zealand on December 1, 2016. The film was screened in France on December 28. The film, distributed by Anime Limited, was also released in the United Kingdom on November 18, 2016. Distributed by Funimation, it was released in North American theaters on April 7, 2017. In Germany, the film was screened in over 150 cinemas in January 2018, being completely sold out on the first day. It ranked as one of the top ten movies of that weekend. Due to high demand, additional screening days were arranged.

Your Name was re-released in North American theaters in August 2026 in recognition of the 10th anniversary since its original release.

=== Home media ===
Your Name was released in 4K UHD Blu-ray, Blu-ray, and DVD on July 26, 2017, in Japan by Toho Pictures. The release was offered in Regular, Special, and Collector's editions. Funimation announced on July 1 at Anime Expo 2017 that the film would be released on Blu-ray and DVD by the end of 2017, but did not specify a date. At Otakon 2017, Funimation announced they were releasing the film in both Standard and Limited Edition Blu-Ray and DVD Combo Packs on November 7. In the first week after release, the Blu-ray standard edition sold 202,370 units, the collector's edition sold 125,982 units and the special edition sold 94,079 units. The DVD Standard Edition placed first, selling 215,963. Your Name is the first anime to place three Blu-ray Disc releases in the top 10 of Oricon's overall Blu-ray Disc chart for 2 consecutive weeks. In 2017, the film generated ¥6,532,421,094 (US$58,238,797) in media revenue from physical home video, soundtrack and book sales in Japan.

Overseas, the film grossed over US$10.5 million from DVD and Blu-ray sales in the United States as of April 2022. In the United Kingdom, the film was 2017's second best-selling foreign language film on home video (below Operation Chromite) and again the second best-selling foreign language film (below My Neighbor Totoro) in 2018.

=== Television broadcasts ===
==== Domestic ====
Your Name was broadcast on Japanese television for the first time on November 4, 2017, transmitted by Wowow. In addition, the channel aired a special program dedicated to Shinkai and his previous works. The film, furthermore, received a Japanese terrestrial television première on January 3, 2018, via TV Asahi; its initial broadcast received a 17.4% audience rating.

==== International ====
On February 18, 2018, Your Name premièred on Philippine television through the free-to-air broadcaster ABS-CBN and its HD television service. However, it was shown in a truncated form (lasting 75 minutes), having been for commercial breaks. According to statistics from Kantar Media Philippines, the film's free-to-air broadcast received an audience rating of 9.2%; according to AGB Nielsen NUTAM statistics, it received a 3.1% audience rating. On April 9, 2020, as part of its Holy Week presentation, the film was aired again (with minor cuts for content) at a longer runtime of 102 minutes (excluding commercials in its 2-hour timeslot), becoming a trending topic through social media platforms. Shinkai expressed his gratitude towards those who watched the latter broadcast through a post on Twitter.

== Reception ==
=== Box office ===
Your Name was a major international commercial success; until the release of Demon Slayer: Kimetsu no Yaiba – The Movie: Mugen Train, it was the highest-grossing Japanese film of all time, grossing US$400 million worldwide.

==== Domestic ====
The film's greatest success came in its native Japan, where it grossed ¥25.17 billion, 10% of the nation's entire box office revenue for that year. It achieved the second-largest gross for a domestic film in the country, behind Spirited Away, and the fourth-largest ever, behind Titanic and Frozen. It is the first anime film not directed by Hayao Miyazaki to earn more than US$100 million (~¥10 billion) at the Japanese box office. The film topped the Japanese box office for a record-breaking twelve non-consecutive weekends, holding the number-one position for nine consecutive weekends before being overtaken by Death Note: Light Up the New World in the last weekend of October. It returned to the top for another three weeks before being overtaken once again by Fantastic Beasts and Where to Find Them.

==== International ====
The success of the film also extended beyond Japan, becoming the highest-grossing Japanese film in China on December 17, 2016. Having grossed US$81.3 million in China, it is the highest-grossing traditionally animated film in the country. The film was screened in over 7,000 theaters, earning an estimated US$10.9 million on its opening day from 66,000 screenings and attracting over 2.77 million viewers, becoming the biggest traditionally animated film opening in China. It also held the record for the highest-grossing non-Hollywood foreign film in China until it was surpassed by two Indian films, Dangal and Secret Superstar, in May 2017 and February 2018, respectively. On July 19, 2024, Your Name was re-released in China, earning over US$5.3 million on its opening day alone.

The film reached number one on its opening five days in South Korea, with 1.18 million admissions and a gross of US$8.2 million, becoming the first Japanese film since Howl's Moving Castle to reach that place in the country. The film eventually drew a total 3.81 million admissions in South Korea and grossed US$23.6 million, making it the highest-grossing anime film in South Korea until it was surpassed in 2023 by The First Slam Dunk and Suzume (which was also directed by Shinkai, and is the third installment of his "disaster trilogy").

In Thailand, Your Name grossed ฿44.1 million (US$1.23 million). By December 26, 2016, the film grossed US$771,945 in Australia and US$95,278 in New Zealand. On December 20, Australian distributor Madman Entertainment stated that the film made over A$1 million in the Australian box office before closing its limited release run.

In the United States and Canada, the film grossed a total US$5,017,246. In the United Kingdom, it grossed £500,000 (US$675,000) in 2016, making it the year's fifth highest-grossing non-English and non-Hindi film in the country.

=== Critical response ===
Your Name was met with widespread critical acclaim. From 120 reviews, Rotten Tomatoes reported that 98% of critics gave the film positive reviews, with an average rating of 8.2/10. The site's critical consensus reads, "As beautifully animated as it is emotionally satisfying, Your Name adds another outstanding chapter to writer-director Makoto Shinkai's filmography." On Metacritic, the film has a score of 81 out of 100 based on 26 critics, indicating "universal acclaim."

Mark Schilling of The Japan Times gave the film a rating of 4 out of 5 and praised the film's animation for its "blend of gorgeous, realistic detail and emotionally grounded fantasy." He also described the film's "over-deliver[y]" of "the comedy of adolescent embarrassment and awkwardness" and its ending for being "To the surprise of no one who has ever seen a Japanese seishun eiga (youth drama)." Reception outside of Japan was also highly positive. Mark Kermode called the film his ninth favorite film to be released in the United Kingdom in 2016. American reviews were generally positive: in The New York Times, Manohla Dargis described it as "a wistfully lovely Japanese tale", while David Sims of The Atlantic said it was "a dazzling new work of anime". Furthermore, The Boston Globe had a positive opinion of the film, saying that it was "pretty but too complicated." Mike Toole from Anime News Network listed it as the third-best anime film of all time. John Musker and Ron Clements, directors of the Disney animated films The Great Mouse Detective, The Little Mermaid, Aladdin, Hercules, Treasure Planet, The Princess and the Frog, and Moana, praised it for its beauty and originality.

Despite the acclaim, Shinkai insists that the film was not as good as it could have been: "There are things we could not do, [director of animation] Masashi Ando wanted to keep working [on] but had to stop us for lack of money [...] For me, it's incomplete, unbalanced. The plot is fine but the film is not at all perfect. Two years was not enough."

=== Legacy ===
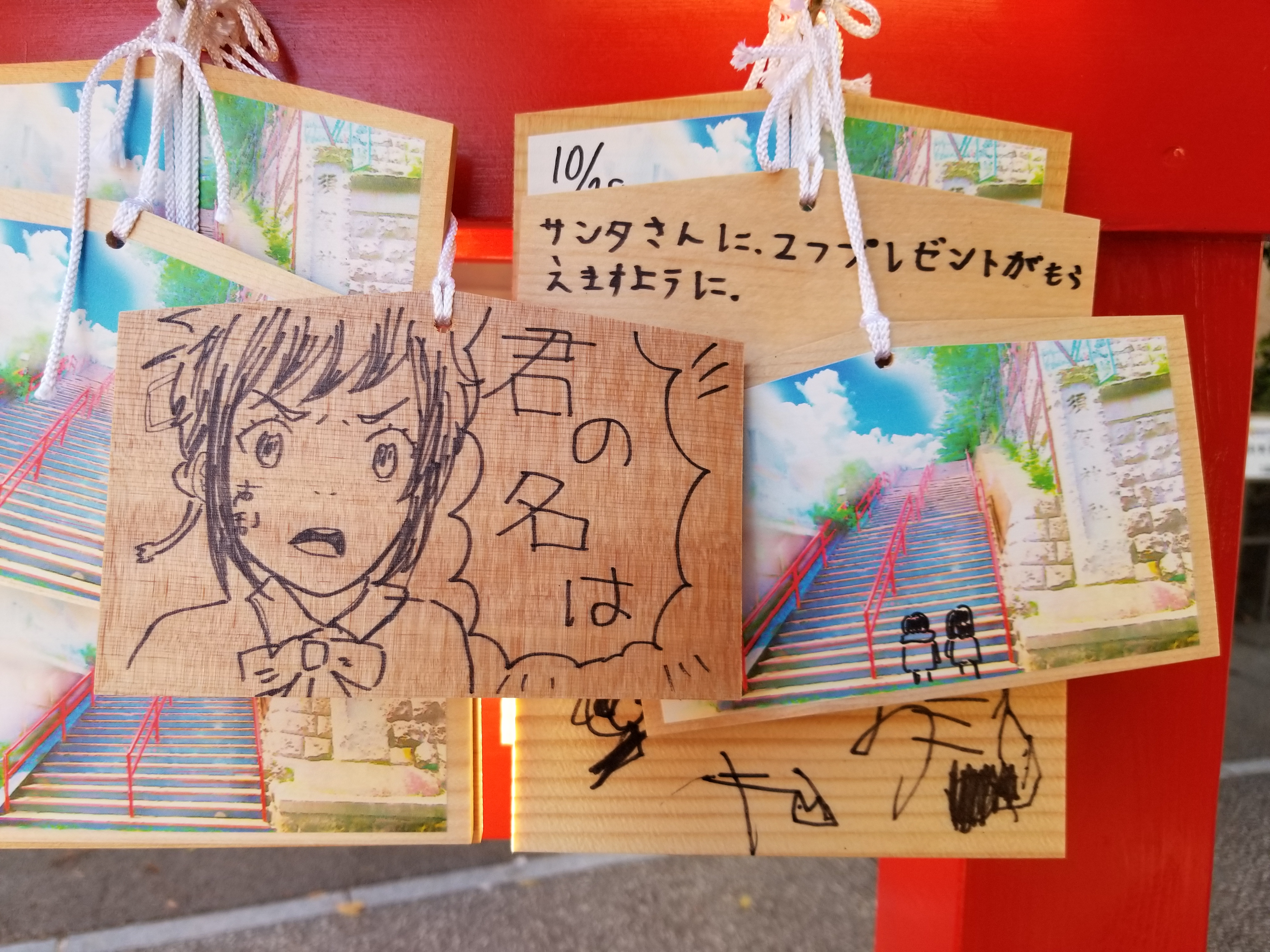
Ema referencing the film at the Suga Shrine in Shinjuku

Various characters from Your Name, especially its protagonists Taki Tachibana and Mitsuha Miyamizu, appeared in Shinkai's succeeding film Weathering with You (2016; also the second of his disaster trilogy), as well as in its light novelization.

Nekotofu, creator of the manga Onimai: I'm Now Your Sister!, cites Your Name among his influences, stating that its popularity motivated the series' creation. According to Crunchyroll, the film's success helped push non-Ghibli anime films into a more mainstream place in Japan, and changed trends in not merely in the production of anime films but also in their promotion.

On August 8, 2017, the renowned manufacturer Good Smile Company opened pre-orders for its 1/8 scale figures of Taki and Mitzuha. Priced at ¥8,800 each, their release was set for March 2018.

Your Name has been referenced and parodied in popular culture, including in the eighth episode of Little Witch Academia and the third episode of Gabriel DropOut; others include a pornographic spoof titled Your Rope (2017), Complicity (a 2018 Japanese film), the first episode of Pop Team Epic, Shirobako: The Movie, the video game Last Stop, a promotional advertisement for a season of the online game Fortnite, and the first episode of the second season of The 100 Girlfriends Who Really, Really, Really, Really, Really Love You. In the preview episode for the third season of Kaguya-sama: Love is War, one of the characters names Your Name as his favorite anime. In the postscript for Yumi and the Nightmare Painter, author Brandon Sanderson cites Your Name as a core inspiration.

In 2025, it was one of the films voted for the "Readers' Choice" edition of The New York Times' list of "The 100 Best Movies of the 21st Century", finishing in 168th place.

== Accolades ==
List of awards and nominations
Year	Award	Category	Recipient(s)	Result
2016	49th Sitges Film Festival	Best Animated Feature Length Film	Your Name	Won
2016	60th BFI London Film Festival	Best Film	Your Name	Nominated
2016	18th Bucheon International Animation Festival	Best Animated Feature Special Distinction Prize	Your Name	Won
2016	18th Bucheon International Animation Festival	Best Animated Feature Audiences Prize	Your Name	Won
2016	29th Tokyo International Film Festival	Arigato Award	Makoto Shinkai	Won
2016	6th Newtype Anime Awards	Best Picture (Film)	Your Name	Won
2016	6th Newtype Anime Awards	Best Soundtrack	Your Name	Runner-up
2016	6th Newtype Anime Awards	Best Theme Song Category	Zenzenzense	Runner-up
2016	41st Hochi Film Award	Best Picture	Your Name	Nominated
2016	29th Nikkan Sports Film Award	Best Film	Your Name	Nominated
2016	29th Nikkan Sports Film Award	Best Director	Makoto Shinkai	Won
2016	2016 Los Angeles Film Critics Association Awards	Best Animated Film	Your Name	Won
2016	Women Film Critics Circle 2016	Best Animated Female	Your Name	Nominated
2017	20th Japan Media Arts Festival	Grand Prize of Animation Division	Your Name	Won
2017	Japan Expo Awards	Daruma d'Or	Your Name	Won
2017	Japan Expo Awards	Daruma for Best Picture	Your Name	Won
2017	Japan Expo Awards	Daruma for Best Direction	Your Name	Won
2017	Japan Expo Awards	Daruma for Best Screenplay	Your Name	Won
2017	Japan Expo Awards	Daruma for Best Soundtrack	Your Name	Won
2017	37th Nihon SF Taisho Award	Grand Prize	Your Name	Nominated
2017	44th Annie Awards	Best Animated Feature — Independent	Your Name	Nominated
2017	44th Annie Awards	Outstanding Achievement, Directing in an Animated Feature Production	Makoto Shinkai	Nominated
2017	21st Satellite Awards	Best Animated or Mixed Media Feature	Your Name	Nominated
2017	48th Seiun Awards	Best Media	Your Name	Nominated
2017	71st Mainichi Film Awards	Best Animated Film	Your Name	Won
2017	59th Blue Ribbon Awards	Best Film	Your Name	Nominated
2017	59th Blue Ribbon Awards	Best Director	Makoto Shinkai	Nominated
2017	59th Blue Ribbon Awards	Special Award	Your Name	Won
2017	40th Japan Academy Prize	Excellent Animation of the Year	Your Name	Won
2017	40th Japan Academy Prize	Animation of the Year	Your Name	Nominated
2017	40th Japan Academy Prize	Director of the Year	Makoto Shinkai	Nominated
2017	40th Japan Academy Prize	Screenplay of the Year	Makoto Shinkai	Won
2017	40th Japan Academy Prize	Outstanding Achievement in Music	Radwimps	Won
2017	36th Anima Festival	Audience Award for Best Animated Feature	Your Name	Won
2017	11th Seiyu Awards	Best Actor	Ryunosuke Kamiki	Won
2017	11th Seiyu Awards	Best Actress	Mone Kamishiraishi	Won
2017	11th Seiyu Awards	Synergy Award	Your Name	Won
2017	11th Asia Pacific Screen Awards	Best Animated Feature Film	Your Name	Nominated
2017	7th AACTA Awards	Best Asian Film	Your Name	Nominated
2017	San Francisco Film Critics Circle Awards 2017	Best Animated Feature	Your Name	Nominated
2018	Austin Film Critics Association Awards 2017	Best Animated Film	Your Name	Nominated
2018	44th Saturn Awards	Best Animated Film	Your Name	Nominated
2018	2nd Crunchyroll Anime Awards	Best Film	Your Name	Won
2018	24th Manga Barcelona Awards	Best Anime Film	Your Name	Won
2026	32nd Manga Barcelona Awards	Best anime series or movie in physical format (BR / DVD)	Your Name – Collector's Edition	Pending

== Adaptations ==
=== Novelization ===
The film was adapted as a light novel by Makoto Shinkai himself. It was published in Japan by Kadokawa on June 18, 2016, a month prior to the film's première, and is 262 pages long.

By September 2016, it had sold approximately 1,029,000 copies, along with an official visual guide. The novel has sold over 1.3 million copies, while the novel and visual guide have sold over 2.5 million copies combined.

A followup was released on August 1, 2016, under the title Your Name. Another Side: Earthbound. It is set during the events of Your Name through the perspective of Mitsuha's friends and family. The light novel was written by Shinkai and Arata Kanoh, illustrated by Masayoshi Tanaka and Hiyori Asakawa.

Both light novels, which were also adapted as manga by Shinkai himself, were published in English by Yen Press. An audiobook was released by their subdivision Yen Audio in July 2024.

=== Live-action film ===
On September 27, 2017, J. J. Abrams and Eric Heisserer announced that they were developing a live-action remake of Your Name to be released by Paramount Pictures and Bad Robot in cooperation with Toho, who produced the original film. The latter is to handle the film's distribution in Japan. Abrams and Heisserer were to be the film's producer and screenwriter, respectively. Heisserer stated that the Japanese right holders desired for it to be made from a Western point of view, with a transposition of the film's settings: a Native American woman living in a rural area and a young man from Chicago discovering they are magically and intermittently swapping bodies.

Marc Webb signed on to direct the remake in February 2019. By September 2020, Deadline Hollywood reported that Lee Isaac Chung had taken over as both writer and director, working off a draft penned by Emily V. Gordon, with Abrams and Genki Kawamura as co-producers. Citing scheduling issues, Chung departed from the project in July 2021.

On October 31, 2022, Carlos López Estrada was announced to be writing and directing the remake, replacing Webb and Chung.

According to Kawamura, the film was reportedly still in production as of October 2023. Progress had been greatly encumbered by the COVID-19 pandemic and the 2023 Writers Guild of America strike.

== See also ==
- List of highest-grossing animated films
- List of highest-grossing films in Japan
- List of highest-grossing Japanese films
