= Love All Play (novel series) =

Japanese novel series

- First novel volume cover

ラブオールプレー (Rabu Ōru Purē)
- Genre: Sports
- Novel series
- Written by: Asami Koseki
- Published by: Poplar Publishing
- Imprint: Poplar Bunko Pureful
- Original run: May 7, 2011 – March 5, 2014
- Volumes: 4
- Anime television series
- Directed by: Hiroshi Takeuchi
- Written by: Tomoko Konparu
- Music by: Yuki Hayashi
- Studio: Nippon Animation; OLM Team Yoshioka
- Licensed by: Crunchyroll; SA/SEA: Medialink
- Original network: NNS (ytv, NTV)
- Original run: April 2, 2022 – September 24, 2022
- Episodes: 24
- Manga
- Illustrated by: Dam Miyata
- Published by: Shueisha
- Magazine: Tonari no Young Jump
- Original run: April 8, 2022 – October 28, 2022
- Volumes: 3

Love All Play (Japanese: ラブオールプレー, Hepburn: Rabu Ōru Purē) is a Japanese badminton-themed novel series written by Asami Koseki. Poplar Publishing have published four volumes between May 2011 and March 2014 under their Poplar Bunko Pureful imprint. An anime television series adaptation by Nippon Animation and OLM aired from April to September 2022. A manga adaptation with art by Dam Miyata was serialized online via Shueisha's Tonari no Young Jump manga website from April to October of the same year.

== Characters ==
Ryō Mizushima (水嶋 亮, Mizushima Ryō)
Voiced by: Natsuki Hanae
Kento Yusa (遊佐 賢人, Yusa Kento)
Voiced by: Kishō Taniyama
Shōhei Sakaki (榊 翔平, Sakaki Shōhei)
Voiced by: Yōhei Azakami
Kōki Matsuda (松田 航輝, Matsuda Kōki)
Voiced by: Makoto Furukawa
Taichi Higashiyama (東山 太一, Higashiyama Taichi)
Voiced by: Kensho Ono
Yōji Higashiyama (東山 陽次, Higashiyama Yōji)
Voiced by: Tetsuya Kakihara
Akira Uchida (内田 輝, Uchida Akira)
Voiced by: Yuki Kaji
Rika Mizushima (水嶋 里佳, Mizushima Rika)
Voiced by: Minako Kotobuki
Jin Ebihara (海老原 仁, Ebihara Jin)
Voiced by: Kazuya Nakai
Yūta Watanabe (水嶋 亮, Watanabe Yūta)
Voiced by: Yuta Watanabe
Arisa Higashino (東野 有紗, Higashino Arisa)
Voiced by: Arisa Higashino
Shizuo Nakano (中野 静雄, Nakano Shizuo)
Voiced by: Masaya Matsukaze
Hiroto Kadota (門田 博人, Kadota Hiroto)
Voiced by: Shimba Tsuchiya
Yūsuke Yokokawa (横川 祐介, Yokokawa Yūsuke)
Voiced by: Hiroki Takahashi
Shōji Okazaki (岡崎 章二, Okazaki Shōji)
Voiced by: Hiroyuki Yoshino
Tetsuya Arimura (有村 哲也, Arimura Tetsuya)
Voiced by: Masamu Ono
Haruomi Date (伊達 晴臣, Date Haruomi)
Voiced by: Kohsuke Toriumi
Ren Miyagi (宮城 蓮, Miyagi Ren)
Voiced by: Yūki Tai
Hana Sakurai (櫻井 花, Sakurai Hana)
Voiced by: Mikako Komatsu
Shōgo Misaki (岬 省吾, Misaki Shōgo)
Voiced by: Toshiyuki Toyonaga

== Media ==
=== Novels ===
No.	Release date	ISBN
1	May 7, 2011	978-4591122686
2	March 6, 2012	978-4591128886
3	May 1, 2013	978-4591134641
4	March 5, 2014	978-4591139356

=== Anime ===
An anime television series adaptation was announced on August 7, 2021. The series is animated by Nippon Animation and OLM and directed by Hiroshi Takeuchi, with Tomoko Konparu handling series' composition, Riko Kaneda designing the characters, and Yuki Hayashi composing the series' music. It aired from April 2 to September 24, 2022, on ytv, NTV, and other channels. The first opening theme song is "Haru Tsubame" (春玄鳥; "Spring Swallow") by Hey! Say! JUMP, while the ending theme song is "Lyra" (ライラ, Raira) by Longman. The second opening theme song is "Sandersonia" (サンダーソニア, Sandāsonia) by Hey! Say! JUMP, while the second ending theme song is "Kaze no Naka" (風の中; "In the Wind") by Rei Yasuda. Crunchyroll streamed the series outside of Asia. Medialink licensed the series in Southeast Asia, South Asia, and Oceania minus Australia and New Zealand.

==== Episode list ====
No.	Title	Directed by (Note: Information is taken from the ending credits of each episode.)	Written by	Storyboarded by	Original release date
1	"A Fair Wind"; Transliteration: "Junpū" (Japanese: 順風)	Hiroshi Takeuchi, Kanako Watanabe, Kunpei Maeda	Tomoko Konparu	Hiroshi Takeuchi	April 2, 2022
2	"The Journey Begins"; Transliteration: "Tabidachi" (Japanese: 旅立ち)	Kunpei Maeda	Tomoko Konparu	Tebineri-gumi, Jun Kamiya, Kunpei Maeda	April 9, 2022
3	"Entering School"; Transliteration: "Nyūgaku" (Japanese: 入学)	Ken'ichi Nishida	Shingo Irie	Tomoko Akiyama	April 16, 2022
4	"Ranking Match"; Transliteration: "Rankingu-sen" (Japanese: ランキング戦)	Takahiro Hirata	Miharu Hirami	Jōji Shimura	April 23, 2022
5	"Two"; Transliteration: "Futari" (Japanese: ふたり)	Masanori Miyata	Miharu Hirami	Kunihisa Sugishima	April 30, 2022
6	"Twins"; Transliteration: "Tsuinzu" (Japanese: ツインズ)	Mayu Numayama	Masayuki Tanaka	Norio Nitta	May 7, 2022
7	"Willpower"; Transliteration: "Iji" (Japanese: 意地)	Jinya Ichimura	Shingo Irie	Tebineri-gumi, Jun Kamiya, Kunpei Maeda, Jinya Ichimura	May 14, 2022
8	"Summer Breeze"; Transliteration: "Natsukaze" (Japanese: 夏風)	Yūki Morita	Yūichi Orikasa	Ken'ichi Nishida	May 21, 2022
9	"Training Camp"; Transliteration: "Gasshuku" (Japanese: 合宿)	Kanako Watanabe	Motoko Takahashi	Jun Kamiya	May 28, 2022
10	"1+1"	Sayaka Yamai	Arata Kanoh	Sayaka Yamai	June 4, 2022
11	"Fireworks"; Transliteration: "Hanabi" (Japanese: 花火)	Shigeki Awai	Arata Kanoh	Yō★Nakano	June 11, 2022
12	"Gale"; Transliteration: "Hayate" (Japanese: 疾風)	Ken'ichi Nishida	Arata Kanoh	Jōji Shimura, Sayaka Yamai	June 18, 2022
13	"Promise"; Transliteration: "Yasoku" (Japanese: 約束)	Jinya Ichimura	Yūichi Orikasa	Hideki Tonokatsu	June 25, 2022
14	"Discord"; Transliteration: "Namikaze" (Japanese: 波風)	Hideaki Ōba	Motoko Takahashi	Hideaki Ōba	July 9, 2022
15	"Seniors"; Transliteration: "Senpai" (Japanese: 先輩)	Kōki Uchinomiya, Yūki Kusakabe, Keizō Shimizu	Motoko Takahashi	Takashi Iida	July 16, 2022
16	"Hamburg Steak Revolution"; Transliteration: "Hanbāgu Kakumei" (Japanese: ハンバーグ革命)	Hiroshi Kimura	Masako Imai	Ken'ichi Nishida	July 23, 2022
17	"Lull"; Transliteration: "Nagi" (Japanese: 凪)	Yasuhiro Noda	Arata Kanoh	Masayoshi Nishida	July 30, 2022
18	"How the Wind Blows"; Transliteration: "Kumoyuki" (Japanese: 雲行)	Sayaka Yamai	Ayako Katō	Jōji Shimura	August 6, 2022
19	"Light Breeze"; Transliteration: "Kunpū" (Japanese: 薫風)	Shigeki Awai	Motoko Takahashi	Yoshiaki Okumura	August 13, 2022
20	"Departure"; Transliteration: "Shuttatsu" (Japanese: 出立)	Ken'ichi Nishida	Yūichi Orikasa	Ken'ichi Nishida	August 20, 2022
21	"Whirlwind"; Transliteration: "Senpū" (Japanese: 旋風)	Jinya Ichimura	Arata Kanoh	Satoshi Nishimura	September 3, 2022
22	"Push Forward"; Transliteration: "Yūō Maishin" (Japanese: 勇往邁進)	Sayaka Yamai	Ayako Katō	Jōji Shimura	September 10, 2022
23	"Favorable Wind"; Transliteration: "Tokitsukaze" (Japanese: 時つ風)	Hiroshi Kimura	Arata Kanoh	Ken'ichi Nishida	September 17, 2022
24	"Love All Play"; Transliteration: "Rabu Ōru Purē" (Japanese: ラブオールプレー)	Kanako Watanabe	Motoko Takahashi	Masayoshi Nishida, Hiroshi Takeuchi	September 24, 2022

=== Manga ===
A manga adaptation with art by Dam Miyata was serialized online via Shueisha's Tonari no Young Jump website from April 8, 2022, to October 28, 2022. It was collected in three tankōbon volumes.

No.	Japanese release date	Japanese ISBN
1	June 17, 2022	978-4-08-892323-9
2	September 16, 2022	978-4-08-892437-3
3	January 19, 2023	978-4-08-892541-7

== Reception ==
=== Previews ===
Anime News Network had five editors review the first episode of the anime: Caitlin Moore was positive towards the "smooth and glossy" animation having lifelike detail but was critical of the grounded storytelling that utilized a slow pace and less badminton scenes; Richard Eisenbeis praised the "solid human drama" surrounding Ryo's young adult life but felt the "bog-standard" ending with the cliché teammates lowered his excitement; James Beckett critiqued that the episode had nothing for casual viewers outside of its given sport, criticizing Ryo's introductory arc for being boring and utilizing a "chintzy soundtrack" to emphasize forced dramatics throughout the story; Nicholas Dupree observed that it followed the "average high-school sports show" formula but came across as "an uncomfortably stiff and empty start" to the show with dull character interactions and badminton scenes, concluding that he would "rather watch a match than sit through another episode of Love All Play going through the motions." The fifth reviewer, Rebecca Silverman, praised the episode for highlighting Ryo's interactions with his friends and family about his sport recommendation but noted that the "introductory nature" will require viewers to watch another episode or two to see how much they will enjoy it, concluding that "there's nothing overtly wrong with this episode even if there's nothing overtly right either, and if you're hankering for some boys playing sports in shorts, this very well might fit the bill."

=== Series ===
Silverman reviewed the first half of the series and gave it a B− grade. She praised the cast's "facial expressions" for making them distinct from each other (singling out identical twins Taichi and Youji), their interactions in and out of the sport and Ebihara being an "attentive coach", but found the overall plot "fairly cookie-cutter" with "rushed and choppy" pacing during its tournaments and a lack of focus on badminton, concluding that: "While it may not be the hot-blooded sports action some viewers are looking for, it is a perfectly decent series, and certainly one that's good enough to hang on to for a second cour." Silverman chose Love All Play as her pick for the Worst Anime of 2022, writing: "It seemed oddly reluctant for a sports show to actually show, you know, sports. It had its moments, but not enough of them, and it's one of the few times I have thought I would really like to get back the hours I invested."
