= Your Name (novel) =

2016 light novel by Makoto Shinkai

- Author: Makoto Shinkai
- Original title: 君の名は。 (Kimi no Na wa)
- Language: Japanese
- Publisher: Kadokawa Shoten
- Publication date: June 18, 2016
- Publication place: Japan
- English publication date: May 23, 2017
- Pages: 262

Your Name (Japanese: 君の名は。, Hepburn: Kimi no Na wa) is a Japanese light novel written by Makoto Shinkai. It is a novelization of his animated film of the same name. It was published in Japan by Kadokawa Shoten on June 18, 2016, a month prior to the film's première.

== Plot ==
Mitsuha Miyamizu is a high school student in Itomori (Note: 糸守; lit. 'thread guard'), Gifu, a rural town in central Japan. Having grown bored of her provincial life, she wishes to be reborn as a boy from Tokyo. Soon, (Note: On September 3, 2013 (September 3, 2016 in Taki's timeline).) she begins to intermittently switch bodies with Taki Tachibana, a high school student (and part-time waiter) from Tokyo's ward of Shinjuku. On certain days, Taki and Mitsuha wake up in each other's bodies and must live the entire day as the other, reverting when they sleep. The two set up ground rules for sharing their bodies, communicating via writing messages on paper, their phones, and their skin. Mitsuha (in Taki's body) sets Taki up on a date with his coworker, Miki Okudera, while Taki (in Mitsuha's body) helps Mitsuha become more popular at school. While in Mitsuha's body, Taki accompanies Mitsuha's grandmother Hitoha and younger sister Yotsuha to a Shinto shrine in the Goshintai (Note: 御神体; lit. 'body of sovereign god') crater near Itomori, (Note: On October 2, 2013.) leaving an offering of kuchikamizake fermented with Mitsuha's saliva. Hitoha explains that God is sovereign over both time and the connections between humans. Mitsuha tells Taki (Note: On October 4, 2013 in the original timeline (October 3, 2016 in Taki's).) that the comet Tiamat is expected to pass nearest to Earth on the day of the autumn festival. The next day, (Note: October 3, 2016; Mitsuha set the date the day prior.) Taki goes on a date (at the National Art Center in Roppongi) with Okudera in his own body; Okudera enjoys the date but says she can tell Taki is preoccupied with someone else, owing to his unusual behavior. Realizing he is falling for Mitsuha, (Note: In the film, minutes before this, Mitsuha was seen crying upon realizing that she was falling for Taki.) Taki attempts to dial her number, but cannot reach her. The body-switching stops as inexplicably as it started.

Taki, Okudera, and his classmate Tsukasa Fujii travel to Hida to search for Mitsuha. (Note: On October 21, 2016. In the meantime, Taki and Tsukasa's friend Shinta Takagi substitutes for the former's shift at Il Giardino delle Parole, where all three are employed.) As Taki does not know the name of Mitsuha's village, he sketches its landscape from memory. A ramen-shop owner in Takayama recognizes the town as Itomori and offers to take the trio there. When they arrive, they find the town completely in ruins (with Mitsuha's messages simultaneously vanishing from his phone), having been almost entirely decimated by fragments that fell from Tiamat. Since the comet passed three years earlier, Taki realizes that he and Mitsuha were separated by three years, with her living in 2013 and him in 2016. At Hida City Library, the three discover that Mitsuha, her family members, and friends were among the five-hundred victims killed by the comet's impact. Taki then begins to lose his memories of Mitsuha. Frantically, Taki leaves his inn accommodation (Note: On October 22, 2016.) and rushes to the shrine at Goshintai to imbibe Mitsuha's kuchikamizake. Upon doing so, he faints, undergoing a vision chronicling much of her life, and realizes that she once came to Tokyo to find him. (Note: On October 3, 2013.) Although he was unaware of whom she was, she passed her crimson kumihimo braid to him, which he has worn as a good-luck bracelet ever since. He then awakens in Mitsuha's body on the morning of the festival. (Note: On October 4, 2013.) Hitoha undergoes an epiphany upon observing "Mitsuha's" uncharacteristic behavior; speaking directly to Taki, she reveals that the body-switching phenomenon has been in their family for centuries. Realizing he has a chance to save Mitsuha and the entire town, Taki convinces Mitsuha's friends, Sayaka and Tessie, to assist in broadcasting an emergency signal to evacuate Itomori before the meteor fragments strike. He then rushes to the shrine, where Mitsuha has just woken up in Taki's body. As twilight falls, (Note: Referred to in the film as "magic hour" or "kataware-doki," neologized from "kawatare-doki," an old Japanese word meaning "twilight;" a similar archaic or poetic word in English is crepuscule. "Kawatare" (彼は誰) literally means "Who is he/she?"; "kataware" is homophonic with a word meaning "one part of a couple; fragment" (片割れ). Old Japanese superstition says all manners of supernatural occurrence are possible at twilight.) their timelines intersect, allowing them to finally meet in person. Taki returns Mitsuha's braid, and they attempt to write their names on each other's palms, but twilight ends before Mitsuha can write hers.

Returning to Itomori by foot, Mitsuha observes that the evacuation plan had failed. She then successfully convinces the mayor, her estranged father Toshiki, to order an evacuation drill. Beginning to forget Taki, she discovers that he had written "I love you" on her hand instead of his name. (Note: Taki wrote this phrase due to the precedent of Mitsuha's text-messages being erased. If he did indeed write his name, Musubi (the fictional kami of Miyamizu Shrine) would otherwise erase his name; however, since he wrote a confession, he preserved his sentiment in her mind. Makoto Shinkai once said that Mitsuha intended to write "I love you" on Taki's palm for the same reason. In Shintoism, mystical love cannot be erased, being prevented by the lunar deity Tsukuyomi-no-Mikoto.) Taki awakens in his own time with no memory of Mitsuha. (Note: On October 22, 2016.)

Five years later, Taki, who has graduated from university, struggles to find a job: he is haunted by persistent feelings of longing and emptiness. (Note: On October 4, 2021 (exactly five years following the preceding awakening).) He has continuously fixated on the impact of Tiamat, from which the residents of Itomori were miraculously saved by a fortuitous evacuation drill, but is unable to determine why. Eventually, on April 8, 2022, he glimpses Mitsuha, who has moved to Tokyo, on a parallel metro train, and they race to find each other. On the steps of Suga Shrine, Taki calls out to Mitsuha, and the two simultaneously ask for each other's names, declaiming the film's title (Your Name).

== Release ==
By September 2016, the light novel had sold around 1,029,000 copies. In the second week in September 2016, the novel had sold around 112,000 more copies. After the wide release of the film adaptation in August 2016, the novel reached the top place in Oricon's weekly bunkobon sales charts for three consecutive weeks. The novel has sold over 1.3 million copies as of December 2016. In August 2018, the novel was released in an audiobook format, with Romi Park reading.

Shortly afterwards, a follow-up light novel was released on August 1, 2016, under the title Your Name Another Side: Earthbound. The novel is set during the events of Your Name through the perspective of Mitsuha's friends and family. The light novel was written by Makoto Shinkai and Arata Kanoh, with illustrations by Masayoshi Tanaka and Hiyori Asakawa. In 2017, both light novels were published in English by Yen Press. An audiobook was released by Yen Audio in July 2024.

No.	Title	Original release date	English release date
1	Your Name	June 18, 2016; 978-4-04-102622-9	May 23, 2017; 978-0-316-47186-2
2	Your Name Another Side: Earthbound	August 1, 2016; 978-4-04-104659-3	November 21, 2017; 978-0-316-47311-8

== Manga adaptation ==
A manga version of the novel has also been written by Makoto Shinkai and illustrated by Ranmaru Kotone. The manga was licensed by Yen Press for an English release, with the first volume released on June 20, 2017.

No.	Original release date	Original ISBN	English release date	English ISBN
1	August 23, 2016	978-4-04-068509-0	June 20, 2017	978-0-316-55855-6
2	December 23, 2016	978-4-04-068591-5	November 21, 2017	978-0-316-41288-9
3	April 22, 2017	978-4-04-069170-1	April 10, 2018	978-0-316-52117-8

Another Side: Earthbound also received a manga adaption, written by Arata Kanou and illustrated by Junya Nakamura, through the Cycomics app in July 2017. It was licensed by Yen Press, with the first volume releasing on December 11, 2018.

No.	Original release date	Original ISBN	English release date	English ISBN
1	February 23, 2018	978-4-04-069649-2	December 11, 2018	978-1-9753-2932-7
2	July 16, 2019	978-4-04-065562-8	November 12, 2019	978-1-9753-5963-8

== See also ==
- Your Name, the film the book was based on
- Your Name (album), soundtrack album for the film by Radwimps
