= Suga Shrine =

Suga Shrine may refer to:

- Suga Shrine, a shrine in Unnan, Shimane, Japan
- Suga Shrine (Shinjuku), a shrine in Shinjuku, Tokyo, Japan, best known for its appearance in the 2016 film Your Name
