= Arata Kanoh =

Japanese novelist

Arata Kanoh (Japanese: 加納 新太, Hepburn: Kanō Arata) is a Japanese novelist from Aichi Prefecture. He graduated from the Aichi Prefectural University.

== Works ==
Kanoh has written numerous novels throughout his career, many of which are book adaptations of Shinkai movies such as:

- Your Name. Another Side:Earthbound (ISBN 978-4-0410-4659-3)
- The Garden of Words (ISBN 978-4-0473-4789-2)
- 5 Centimeters per Second: one more side (ISBN 978-4-0472-7307-8)
- The Place Promised in Our Early Days (ISBN 978-4-7577-2588-1)

He was also a screenplay assistant for the award-winning anime Your Name.
