= The Safe-Deposit Box =

1990 short story by Greg Egan

- Short story by Greg Egan
- Country: Australia
- Language: English
- Genre: Science fiction

Publication
- Published in: Asimov's Science Fiction
- Publication type: Periodical
- Media type: Print
- Publication date: September 1990

"The Safe-Deposit Box" is a science-fiction short story by Australian writer Greg Egan, first published in Asimov’s Science Fiction in September 1990. The short story was later included in the author's short story collection Axiomatic in 1995.

== Plot ==
A man wakes up in a new body every day. It is always male, in a certain age range and also the same city. In many ways, his life lacks purpose as for example taking care of his body is pointless. During his childhood, it took a while for him to find out that other people don't live like that. An experiment by a neurosurgeon is speculated to be the cause of the phenomenon. Since living in the same city every day, the man created a safe-deposit box in a central location, which he can access every day and note down past experiences. He still dreams of having a name only belonging to himself.

== Translations ==
The short story was translated into German (1992), Portuguese (1992), Japanese by Makoto Yamagishi (August 1993), Romanian (1995), French (1997), Hungarian by Erno Nemes (1998), Czech by Petr Kotrle, Romanian by Florin Pîtea, Russian (1999), Spanish by Graciela Inés Lorenzo Tillard and Jorge A. González (July 2001), Italian (2003), French by Sylvie Denis, Quarante-Deux & Francis Valéry, Chinese and Korean.

== Background ==
Makoto Shinkai stated that the short story served as inspiration for Your Name and wrote on X, that "in the earliest plot, the heroine was in a different body each time she woke up".

== Reception ==
=== Reviews ===
Karen Burnham wrote in Greg Egan (Masters of Modern Science Fiction), that the short story has "only the most hand-waving of scientific premises", which is "something rather implausible" as well as "even stranger" compared to Egan's other short story "Mister Volition", and that "[t]his, along with 'Unstable Orbits in the Space of Lies', is just about as non-scientific as Egan gets"

Thomas Christensen, writing on sfbook.com, called it "probably one of the coolest stories in this collection [Axiomatic]".

Lorna Wallace writes in the Reactor Magazine, that "[i]t’s a fascinating concept and Egan executes it with philosophical flair."

=== Awards ===
The short story reached the 12th place of the Locus Award in 1991 and the 4th place of Asimov's Reader Poll in 1991.

== Literature ==
- Burnham, Karen (2014). Greg Egan (Modern Masters of Science Fiction). University of Illinois Press (published 3 April 2014). ISBN 978-0252038419.
