= Kuchikamizake =

Kind of rice-based alcohol

Kuchikamizake (口噛み酒; mouth-chewed sake) or kuchikami no sake (口噛みの酒) is a type of sake, rice-based brewed alcohol, produced by a process involving human saliva as a fermentation starter. Kuchikamizake was one of the earliest types of Japanese alcoholic drinks. Kuchi means "mouth", kami means "to chew" and zake is the rendaku form of "sake" found in compound words.

== Description ==
Kuchikamizake is white in colour and has a sour taste. After two weeks of fermentation, it can achieve up to 7% ABV. It is made from chewed rice; the mixture of the enzymes from saliva and rice result in the fermentation process. Some islands in Okinawa Prefecture still held Shinto ceremonies involving chewed sake until the 1930s.

== In popular culture ==
Kuchikamizake is featured as a plot point in Makoto Shinkai's animated film Your Name.

In the 2024 video game Nine Sols by Red Candle Games, "Mouth-Chewing Wine" - likely a reference to Kuchikamizake - is mentioned by a character prominently known for their brewing abilities during a side quest.

== See also ==
- Chicha
- Mead
