= 5 Centimeters per Second =

2007 Japanese film by Makoto Shinkai

- Theatrical release poster

秒速5センチメートル (Byōsoku Go Senchimētoru)
- Created by: Makoto Shinkai
- Anime film
- Directed by: Makoto Shinkai
- Written by: Makoto Shinkai
- Music by: Tenmon
- Studio: CoMix Wave Inc.
- Licensed by: AUS: Madman Entertainment; BI: Anime Limited; NA: GKIDS
- Released: 3 March 2007
- Runtime: 63 minutes
- Novel
- Written by: Makoto Shinkai
- Published by: Media Factory
- English publisher: NA: Yen Press
- Published: 19 November 2007
- Manga
- Written by: Makoto Shinkai
- Illustrated by: Seike Yukiko
- Published by: Kodansha
- English publisher: NA: Vertical Inc.
- Imprint: Afternoon KC
- Magazine: Monthly Afternoon
- Original run: 25 May 2010 – 25 March 2011
- Volumes: 2
- Novel

5 Centimeters per Second: one more side
- Written by: Arata Kanoh
- Published by: Enterbrain
- English publisher: Penguin Random House
- Published: 20 May 2011
- Live-action film
- Directed by: Yoshiyuki Okuyama
- Produced by: Hiromasa Tamai
- Written by: Fumiko Suzuki
- Music by: Ayatake Ezaki
- Released: 10 October 2025
- Runtime: 121 minutes
- icon

5 Centimeters per Second (Japanese: 秒速5センチメートル, Hepburn: Byōsoku Go Senchimētoru) is a 2007 Japanese animated coming-of-age romantic drama film written and directed by Makoto Shinkai. The film consists of three segments in triptych style, each following a period in the life of the protagonist Takaki Tōno and his relationships with the girls around him. It theatrically premiered in Japan on 3 March 2007.

The film was awarded Best Animated Feature Film at the 2007 Asia Pacific Screen Awards. It received a novelization in November 2007 and a manga adaptation illustrated by Seike Yukiko in 2010.

== Plot ==
The story is set in Japan, beginning in the early 1990s up until the present day (2008), (Note: As shown on Takaki's whiteboard (48:50), Risa's message (52:44) and the magazine (55:30)) with each act centered on a boy named Takaki Tōno.

=== Episode 1: Cherry Blossom ===
In 1991, Takaki Tōno quickly befriends Akari Shinohara after she transfers to his elementary school in Tokyo. They grow close due to shared interests, such as preferring to stay inside during recess due to their seasonal allergies. Takaki and Akari refer to each other using their given names without honorifics, which is an indicator of close friendship and intimacy in Japanese culture.

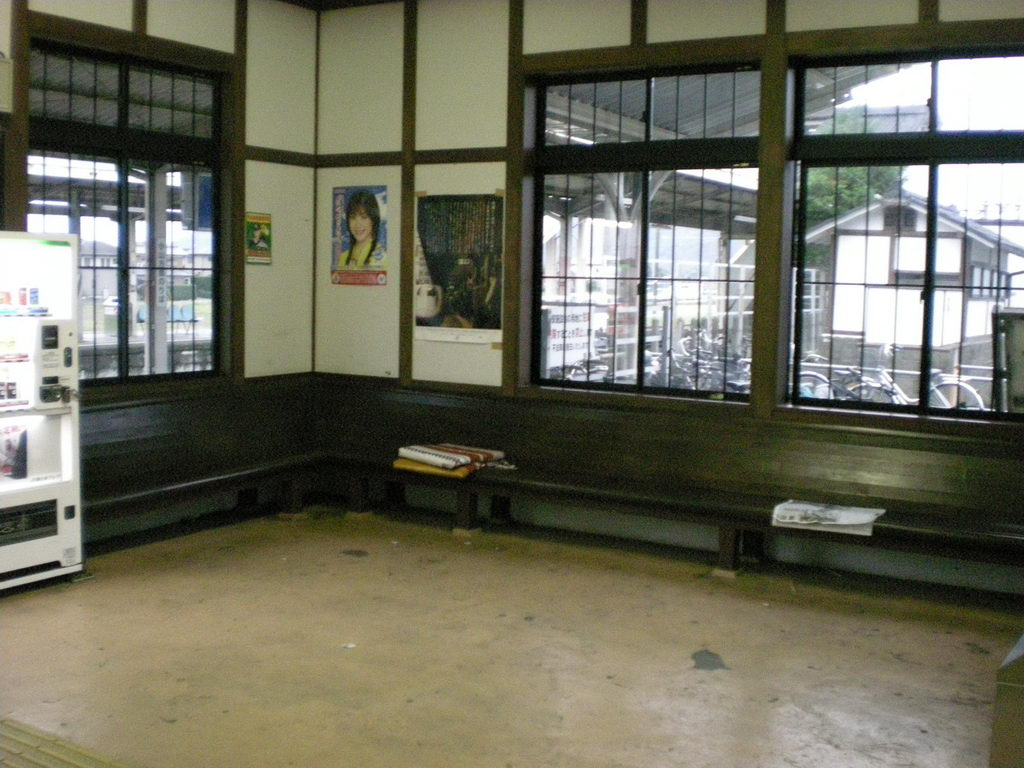
The room in Iwafune Station

Shortly after graduating from elementary school in 1994, Akari moves to the nearby prefecture of Tochigi due to her parents' jobs. The two keep in touch by writing letters but eventually drift apart. When Takaki learns that his family will move to Kagoshima in 1995, he decides to meet with Akari one last time since they will be too far apart to see each other once he moves. He also writes a letter for Akari confessing his feelings for her. However, Takaki loses the letter during the journey and a severe snowstorm delays his train for several hours.

Late that night, Takaki finally arrives at Iwafune Station, and the two lovers share their first kiss under a cherry tree. At that moment, Takaki realizes they will never be together. They spend the night in a nearby shed due to the snowstorm. The next morning, Akari sees Takaki off at the train station, and the two promise to continue writing to each other. As the train departs, Takaki concludes that the loss of his letter is not important anymore after their kiss, while Akari looks at her own letter addressed to Takaki, which she decided not to give him.

=== Episode 2: Cosmonaut ===
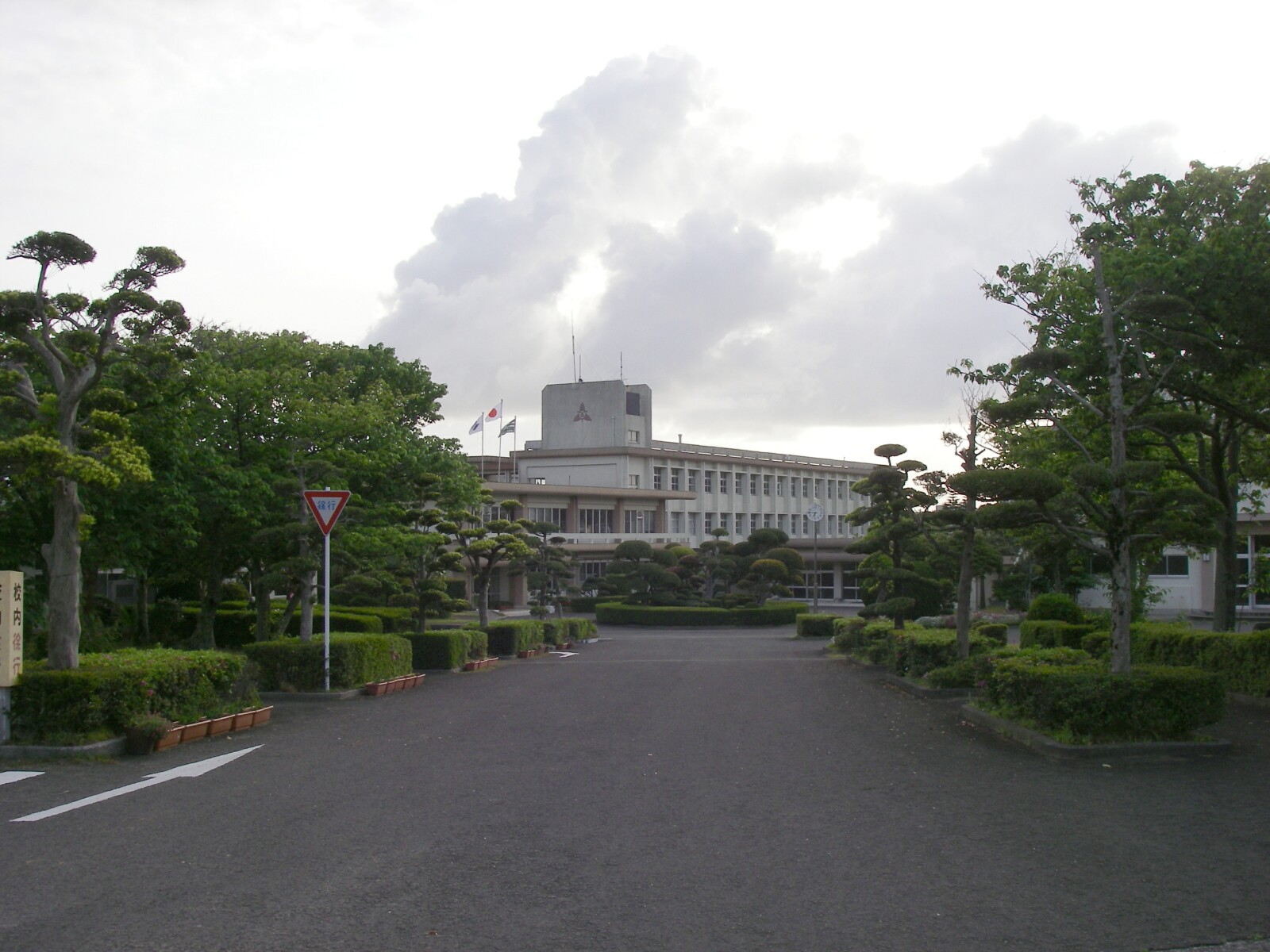
The high school in Tanegashima

In 1999, Takaki is in the third year of senior high in Tanegashima, home to the Tanegashima Space Center. Kanae Sumida, a classmate of Takaki, has loved him ever since first meeting him in middle school but has never had the courage to confess her feelings to him. She tries to spend as much time with him as she can. However, Takaki seems oblivious to Kanae's feelings and treats her as a good friend. Kanae notices that Takaki is always writing emails to someone and staring off into the distance. It is revealed that Takaki's emails are never sent to anyone, and he deletes them afterwards. He also has recurring dreams of Akari.

One evening, as Kanae prepares to confess her love to Takaki, a rocket is launched into the sky, and they both gaze up at it. Kanae realizes that Takaki is looking for something far beyond what she can offer and decides not to confess her feelings, though she believes she will always love him. With such thoughts, she cries herself to sleep.

=== Episode 3: 5 Centimeters per Second ===
In 2008, Takaki is a programmer in Tokyo, and Akari is preparing to marry another man. Takaki still longs for Akari to the detriment of his lifestyle. He receives a call from his current girlfriend but does not answer, signifying the end of the relationship. Depressed, Takaki quits his job as he is unable to cope with his feelings for Akari. Akari goes through a box of her old possessions and finds the letter she had written for Takaki in 1995. In a convenience store, Takaki reads a magazine about the decade-long journey of the rocket launched in Tanegashima. Takaki and Akari begin a dual narration where they both recall a recent dream. In the dream, they relive their last meeting at the snow-filled Iwafune Station and remember the wish to someday watch the cherry blossoms together again.

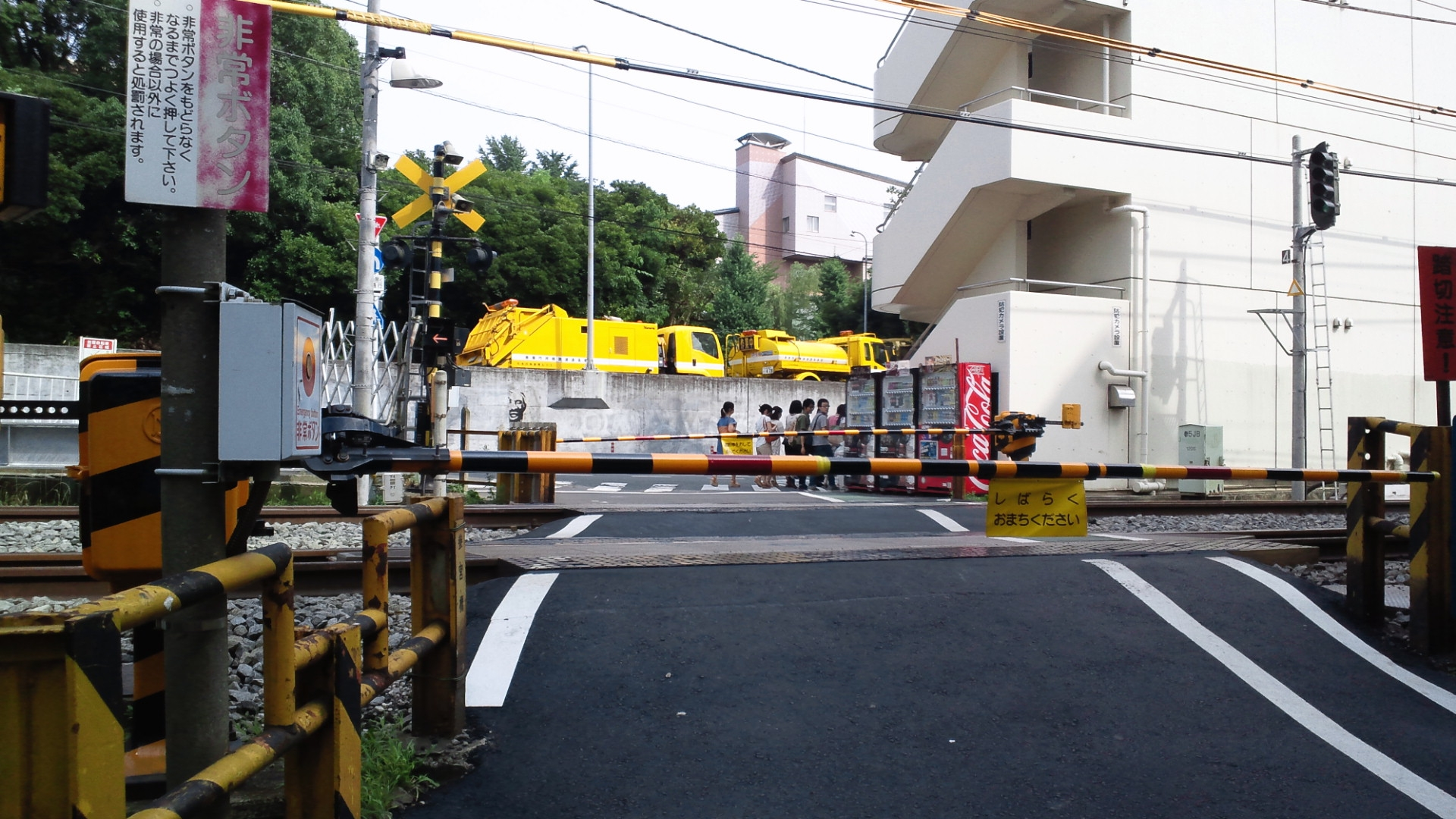
The train crossing in Tokyo

While walking down the same road they knew when they were children, Takaki and Akari pass and seemingly recognize each other at the train crossing. It is the same place they had promised to watch the cherry blossoms together in 1995, just before Akari moved to Tochigi. On opposite sides of the tracks, they stop and turn around, but a passing train blocks their view. After the train passes, Takaki finds that Akari is gone. He smiles to himself and continues walking as the cherry blossoms stir in the train's wake.

== Characters ==
Takaki Tōno (遠野 貴樹, Tōno Takaki)
Voiced by: Kenji Mizuhashi (Japanese); David Matranga (ADV Films release) and Johnny Yong Bosch (Bang Zoom! release) (English)
Portrayed by: Hokuto Matsumura, Haruto Ueda (child), Yuzu Aoki (youth)
Takaki is the main character of the film. Because of his parents' jobs, he is forced to move frequently. He and Akari become close friends, but when Akari moves away, they end up attending different junior high schools. In the second arc, he is shown to be an apt kyūdō practitioner and a member of his school's kyūdō club.
Akari Shinohara (篠原 明里, Shinohara Akari)
Voiced by: Yoshimi Kondō (Act 1) and Ayaka Onoue (Act 3) (Japanese); Hilary Haag (ADV), Erika Weinstein (Act 1, Bang Zoom!) and Tara Platt (Act 3, Bang Zoom!) (English)
Portrayed by: Mitsuki Takahata, Noa Shiroyama (child)
Takaki's best friend and love interest in elementary school. Like Takaki, she and her family move a lot. After elementary school, she moves to Iwafune. She suggests living with her aunt in Tokyo in order to stay with Takaki, but her parents forbid this. For a while, she and Takaki keep in touch via post.
Kanae Sumida (澄田 花苗, Sumida Kanae)
Voiced by: Satomi Hanamura (Japanese); Serena Varghese (ADV) and Kira Buckland (Bang Zoom!) (English)
Portrayed by: Nana Mori
A classmate of Takaki in junior high school and high school. She has been in love with Takaki since he began attending her junior high school, but cannot express her feelings to him. Kanae loves to surf and rides a moped to school. She does not know what she wants to do with her future. Her older sister is a teacher at her high school. In the manga, she is seen working as a nurse after the events depicted in the film.

== Production ==
Makoto Shinkai has said that, unlike his past works, there would be no fantasy or science fiction elements in this film. Instead, the feature film would attempt to present the real world from a different perspective. Shinkai's film gives a realistic view of the struggles many people have to face: time, space, people, and love. The title 5 Centimeters per Second comes from the speed at which cherry blossom petals fall, with petals being a metaphorical representation of humans, reminiscent of the slowness of life and how people often start together but slowly drift into their separate ways. The movie marks the first time Shinkai has worked closely with a full staff of animators and artists.

=== Staff ===
- Director, Writer and Original Creator: Makoto Shinkai
- Character Design and Chief Animation Director: Takayo Nishimura
- Background Art: Takumi Tanji, Ryoko Majima
- Music: Tenmon
- Production and Distribution: CoMix Wave, Inc.

== Music ==
As in Shinkai's previous works, Tenmon composed this film's soundtrack. The film's ending theme was "One More Time, One More Chance" by Masayoshi Yamazaki.

One more time, One more chance
No.	Title	Length
1.	"One more time, One more chance"	5:34
2.	"Yuki no Eki ~One more time, One more chance~ (from "Byōsoku 5 Centimeter" Soundtrack) (雪の駅～One more time, One more chance～ (from『秒速5センチメートル』Soundtrack))"	2:21
3.	"One more time, One more chance (Hikigatari Ver.) (One more time, One more chance (弾き語りVer.))"	5:30
Total length:		13:25

Byōsoku 5 Centimeter Soundtracks (秒速5センチメートル Soundtracks)
No.	Title	Length
1.	"Oukashou (桜花抄)"	4:51
2.	"Omoide ha Tooku no Hibi (想い出は遠くの日々)"	1:41
3.	"Shousou (焦燥)"	1:10
4.	"Yuki no Eki (雪の駅)"	2:19
5.	"Kiss"	3:14
6.	"Kanae no Kimochi (カナエの気持ち)"	1:47
7.	"Yume (夢)"	1:40
8.	"Sora to Umi no Uta (空と海の詩)"	2:00
9.	"Todokanai Kimochi (届かない気持ち)"	1:41
10.	"END THEME"	2:53
11.	"One more time, One more chance PIANO ver."	5:00
Total length:		28:16

== Release ==
Completed on 22 January 2007, the first part streamed on Yahoo! Japan to Yahoo! Premium members from 16 to 19 February 2007. On 3 March 2007, the full-length film had its theatrical premiere at Cinema Rise in Shibuya, Tokyo.

On 30 September 2022, the film received a limited IMAX DMR release in Japan in celebration of Suzume's release. This marks its first IMAX release.

=== Overseas releases ===
In the Philippines, 5 Centimeters per Second, along with Shinkai's previous work The Place Promised in Our Early Days, was premiered on 21 July 2013 at the SM Mall of Asia as part of the Philippines-Japan Friendship Month, with help and cooperation from the Embassy of Japan in the Philippines, Japan Foundation Manila, SM Mall of Asia Cinema and the Film Development Council of the Philippines (FDCP). The showings attracted 1,500 moviegoers.

=== Home media ===
The DVD was released on 19 July 2007 in Japan. The title was licensed by ADV Films and scheduled for a December 2007 release, but the release was delayed until March 2008. The film's Region 2 DVD release date was pushed back from 4 March 2008 to April 2008. The Blu-ray version of the film was released on 18 April 2008 in Japan. The HD DVD version of the film was also released on 18 April 2008 and is region-free by default. The official Russian release by Reanimedia was already in stock in January 2008. The film is also licensed in Taiwan by Proware Multimedia International. On 11 July 2008, ADV announced that it was discontinuing print of the DVD. Bang Zoom! Entertainment has re-dubbed the entire film at the request of its original Japanese distributor, and the new dub was first streamed via Crunchyroll as part of their Day of Makoto Shinkai on 28 February 2009. On 13 August 2010, Crunchyroll CEO Kun Gao announced plans to release titles on DVD, starting with 5 Centimeters per Second. Bandai Entertainment manufactured and distributed the DVDs, which included the Bang Zoom! dub. This version was released 22 February 2011. In 2015, Discotek Media announced that it had licensed 5 Centimeters per Second for a DVD release on 2 June that year, and then 28 February 2017 on Blu-ray. On 10 March 2022, GKIDS announced that they have licensed 5 Centimeters per Second, along with three other works by Makoto Shinkai, and will re-release it on home video in 2022; it was released on Blu-ray on 7 June, with Voices of a Distant Star included as a bonus feature.

On 29 March 2009, distribution company Madman Entertainment announced plans to release 5 Centimetres Per Second in Australia, and released the DVD on 19 August 2009. Madman later released the film on Blu-ray alongside Voices of a Distant Star on 9 October 2019. In the United Kingdom and Ireland, Manga Entertainment distributed the film on DVD within the region on 14 March 2011, and on Blu-ray on 29 October 2018. Anime Limited later acquired the distribution rights within the United Kingdom and Ireland.

== Reception ==
Natsuki Imai, a Japanese television and film director known for her 2007 film Koizora, views 5 Centimeters per Second as a film "completely for adults even though it is an anime".

The film won the Lancia Platinum Grand Prize at the Future Film Festival for best movie in animation or special effects. It won the Award for Best Animated Feature Film at the 2007 Asia Pacific Screen Awards. The limited edition DVD of the film was ranked 3rd on the Tohan charts between 18 and 24 July 2007, while the regular edition of the film was ranked 7th. The film was Japan's fourth most popular Blu-ray film in 2008.

Shinkai has been hailed as the next Miyazaki, and his dreamy mindscapes often equal or surpass the anime maestro in breadth of detail and depth of emotion. Shinkai extends the innate possibilities of the anime dynamic, reapplying its principles of lush effects, inflated background detail and sometimes undernourished character animation to mirror the interiority of the characters in every nuance of their surroundings." – Ronnie Scheib from Variety

Mania.com lists 5 Centimeters per Second as the best anime not by Hayao Miyazaki. The Japan Times's Mark Schilling commends Shinkai saying that he is better than Miyazaki "at piercing the veil of the everyday to reveal a poignant, evanescent beauty most of us notice only in rare moments." Anime News Network's Bamboo Dong commends the anime for its "heartbreakingly gorgeous" piano score composed by Tenmon, which "contributes to the dreamlike quality that the film has". She also comments that film "never comes out and tells you what the characters are feeling. It never follows a strict storyline, but between the interactions on the screen and well-timed shots of lonely landscapes, everything is as clear as night and day". Mania.com's Chris Beveridge criticises the anime for its aliasing as well as it "seems to get a fairly low bitrate during a lot of it which leads to some noisy and overly grainy feeling areas. The film has so many lush colors to it that a lot of them start to show too much noise at times which is almost as distracting as the aliasing." Theron Martin reviewing for Anime News Network commends "The production [which] also excels in its use of sound effects, especially in the bow-shooting scenes in Part 2".

Taken individually, the parts offer nice little vignettes, but taken as a whole they paint a broader picture about the progression of life and love. The ending, which is where this work differs most from Shinkai's previous efforts, will doubtless be controversial and may leave some fans unsatisfied, as it opens itself to multiple interpretations. Some may feel as if it just ends without resolving anything, but if one considers Takaki's few lines of narration in part two, how that part ends, and how everything fits together, it becomes clearer that actually resolving things was never the point. Whereas Voices was about trying to maintain a connection and Place Promised was about reestablishing one, Five Centimeters is ultimately about moving on from past connections instead of just living in the past, about finding a way to become happy in the present rather than just pining for what has been lost over time. In that sense Five Centimeters is Shinkai's most mature and complicated work yet." – Theron Martin, Anime News Network

In 2010, "Trains" magazine rated this film 45th of the 100 Greatest Train Movies.

== Adaptations ==
=== Novel ===
The novel version of 5 Centimeters per Second, licensed by Media Factory, was released on 16 November 2007 in Japan. It was the first novel written by Makoto Shinkai. The photographs in the novel were also taken by Shinkai. The novel is licensed by Yen Press for North America. The English translation was done by Taylor Engel. Another version of the novel, One more side, was released on 20 May 2011 in Japan. The author is Arata Kanoh, who also wrote the novels for Voices of a Distant Star and The Place Promised in Our Early Days, two of Shinkai's other films. The English translation of One more side was released on 26 February 2019 by Vertical Inc.

=== Manga ===
A manga adaptation of the film, illustrated by manga artist Yukiko Seike, was serialized in Kodansha's seinen manga magazine Monthly Afternoon from 25 May 2010 to 25 March 2011. Its chapters were collected in two tankōbon volumes by Kodansha, released on 22 November 2010 and 22 April 2011. It has been published in English as a single omnibus volume by Vertical Inc. The English translation was done by Melissa and Taka Tanaka. In the manga adaptation, the second two sections of the story are expanded upon. Akari, Kanae, and Risa (Takaki's girlfriend from Episode 3) all receive much more focus.

No.	Original release date	Original ISBN	English release date	English ISBN
1	22 November 2010	978-4-06-310711-1	26 June 2012 (print); 8 March 2016 (digital)	978-1-93223-496-1 (print); 978-1-68233-230-6 (digital)
1. "On Cherry Blossoms" (桜花抄, Ōka Shō); 2. "Restless" (焦燥, Shōsō); 3. "Distant Memories" (想い出は遠くの日々, Omoide wa Tōku no Hibi); 4. "Kanae's Feelings" (カナエの気持ち, Kanae no Kimochi); 5. "Cosmonaut" (コスモナウト, Kosumonauto)
2	22 April 2011	978-4-06-310739-5	26 June 2012 (print); 8 March 2016 (digital)	978-1-93223-496-1 (print); 978-1-68233-230-6 (digital)
6. "To Be Your Number One..." (君のいちばんに..., Kimi no Ichiban ni...); 7. "END THEME_1"; 8. "END THEME_2"; 9. "END THEME_3"; 10. "One More Time, One More Chance"; Epilogue: "A Poem of the Sky and Sea" (空と海の詩, Sora to Umi no Uta)

=== Closet drama ===
A live recitation of the film was held on 21 October 2020 to 25 October 2020 by the drama company "Reading Love" where all three parts of the movie were recited.

=== Live-action film ===
On 22 September 2024, a live action film adaptation was announced, which was released on 10 October 2025. The lead role was played by Hokuto Matsumura of the six-member group SixTONES, his first leading role in a film.

In March 2026, it was announced that the live-action adaptation would be aired at every SM Cinema branch in the Philippines starting on 8 April 2026.
