= List of The 100 Girlfriends Who Really, Really, Really, Really, Really Love You episodes =

Episodes of Japanese anime series

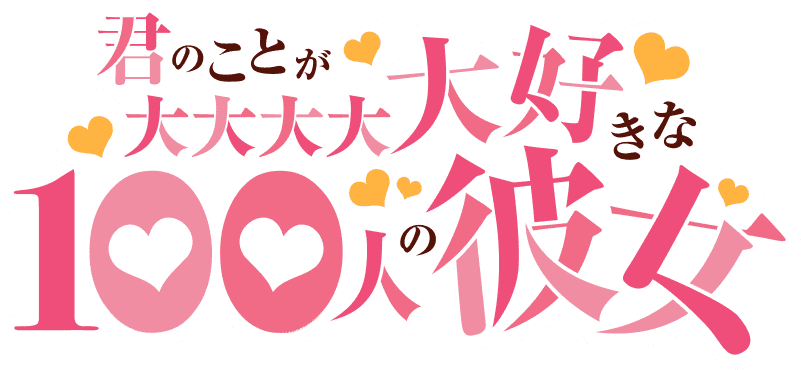

The 100 Girlfriends Who Really, Really, Really, Really, Really Love You is an anime television series based on the manga series of the same name written by Rikito Nakamura and illustrated by Yukiko Nozawa. The anime is produced by Bibury Animation Studios and directed by Hikaru Sato, with scripts supervised by Takashi Aoshima, character designs handled by Akane Yano, and music composed by Shuhei Mutsuki, Shunsuke Takizawa, and Eba. A total of three seasons have been produced thus far.

== Series overview ==
Season	Episodes	Originally released	
Season	Episodes	First released	Last released
1	12	October 8, 2023	December 24, 2023
2	12	January 12, 2025	March 30, 2025
3	12	July 5, 2026	September 20, 2026

== Episodes ==
=== Season 1 (2023) ===
No. overall	No. in season	Title	Directed by	Written by	Storyboarded by	Original release date
1	1	"The 2 Girlfriends Who Really, Really, Really Love You (98 to Go)"; Transliteration: "Kimi no Koto ga Dai Dai Dai Dai Daisuki na Ni-nin no Kanojo (Ato Kyūjūhachi-nin)" (Japanese: 君のことが大大大大大好きな2人の彼女（あと98人）)	Yūichirō Aoki	Takashi Aoshima	Hikaru Sato & Nagisa Miyazaki	October 8, 2023
2	2	"First Kiss"; Transliteration: "Hajimete no Chū" (Japanese: はじめてのチュウ)	Yūichirō Aoki	Takashi Aoshima	Taizo Yoshida	October 15, 2023
3	3	"The Quiet Princess, the Knight, and the Samurai"; Transliteration: "Mukuchi na Hime to Kishi to Bushi" (Japanese: 無口な姫と騎士と武士)	Yūki Gotō	Yasunori Yamada	Yūki Gotō	October 22, 2023
4	4	"Just When You Think It's a Hanky-Panky Episode"; Transliteration: "Ichaicha-kai to Omoiki ya" (Japanese: いちゃいちゃ回と思いきや)	Yūichirō Aoki	Yasunori Yamada	Satoshi Shimizu	October 29, 2023
5	5	"The Hyper-Efficient Girl"; Transliteration: "Kōritsu-teki na Kanojo" (Japanese: 効率的な彼女)	Mitsutaka Noshitani	Takamitsu Kōno	Ryūta Yamamoto	November 5, 2023
6	6	"Everyone's Favorite: The Swimsuit Episode"; Transliteration: "Minna Daisuki Mizugi-kai" (Japanese: 皆大好き水着回)	Takahiro Hirata	Takamitsu Kōno	Taizo Yoshida	November 12, 2023
7	7	"Saying Hello to the Chemistry Girl"; Transliteration: "Hajimemashite no Okusuri Shōjo" (Japanese: はじめましてのお薬少女)	Ryūta Yamamoto	Yasunori Yamada	Satoshi Shimizu	November 19, 2023
8	8	"Kiss Zombie Panic"; Transliteration: "Kisu Zonbi Panikku" (Japanese: キスゾンビ♡パニック)	Ryūta Yamamoto	Yasunori Yamada	Ryūta Yamamoto & Hikaru Sato	November 26, 2023
9	9	"The Holy War of Love and Soul"; Transliteration: "Ai to Tamashii o Kaketa Seisen" (Japanese: 愛と魂をかけた聖戦)	Masato Jinbo	Takamitsu Kōno	Hiroyuki Shimazu	December 3, 2023
10	10	"Love Mission: Impossible"; Transliteration: "Rabu Misshon: Inposshiburu" (Japanese: ラブミッション：インポッシブル)	Takahiro Hirata	Takashi Aoshima	Takahiro Hirata	December 10, 2023
11	11	"Even If It Kills Me"; Transliteration: "Kono Inochi ni Kaete mo" (Japanese: この命にかえても)	Masanori Miyata	Takashi Aoshima	Takuya Satō	December 17, 2023
12	12	"The 100 Girlfriends Who Really, Really, Really, Really, Really Love You (94 to Go)"; Transliteration: "Kimi no Koto ga Dai Dai Dai Dai Daisuki na Hyaku-nin no Kanojo (Ato Kyūjūyon-nin)" (Japanese: 君のことが大大大大大好きな100人の彼女（あと94人）)	Yūichirō Aoki	Takashi Aoshima	Nagisa Miyazaki	December 24, 2023

=== Season 2 (2025) ===
No. overall	No. in season	Title	Directed by	Written by	Storyboarded by	Original release date
13	1	"Her Name."; Transliteration: "Kano no Na wa." (Japanese: 彼（カノ）の名は。)	Yūichirō Aoki	Takashi Aoshima	Taizo Yoshida	January 12, 2025
14	2	"The Beginning and the End! Food Fight Festival!"; Transliteration: "Kaimaku! Gekitō! Kecchaku! Fūdo Faito Fesutibaru" (Japanese: 開幕！激闘！決着！フードファイトフェスティバル)	Yūichirō Aoki	Takashi Aoshima	Taizo Yoshida	January 19, 2025
15	3	"What Does the Maid See?"; Transliteration: "Meido-san wa Mie Teru?" (Japanese: メイドさんは見えてる？)	Ryūta Yamamoto	Yasunori Yamada	Nagisa Miyazaki	January 26, 2025
16	4	"Super Soaked Maid Party"; Transliteration: "Nure Nure Meido Pātī" (Japanese: ぬれぬれメイドパーティー)	Takahiro Hirata	Yasunori Yamada	Ryūhei Aoyagi	February 2, 2025
17	5	"Most Athletes Are Masochists"; Transliteration: "Asurīto wa Kihon Doemu" (Japanese: アスリートは基本ドM)	Hikaru Sato	Takamitsu Kōno	Hikaru Sato	February 9, 2025
18	6	"A Homerun Promise"; Transliteration: "Kimi no Hōmuran ni Chikau" (Japanese: 君のホームランに誓う)	Ryūta Yamamoto	Takamitsu Kōno	Taizo Yoshida	February 16, 2025
19	7	"Karaoke Crisis"; Transliteration: "Karaoke Kuraishisu" (Japanese: カラオケ・クライシス)	Yūichirō Aoki	Yasunori Yamada	Satoshi Shimizu	February 23, 2025
20	8	"The Beautiful and the Bold"; Transliteration: "Utsukushiki Mono-tachi" (Japanese: 美しきものたち)	Ryūta Yamamoto	Yasunori Yamada	Satoshi Shimizu	March 2, 2025
21	9	"The World Hair Only Grows"; Transliteration: "Kami no Mizo Shiru Sekai" (Japanese: 髪のみぞ知る世界)	Yūichirō Aoki	Takamitsu Kōno	Takashi Sano	March 9, 2025
22	10	"Peekaboy-Meets-Girl"; Transliteration: "Kakurenbōi-Mītsu-Gāru" (Japanese: かくれんボーイミーツガール)	Yoshihisa Matsumoto, Hikaru Sato, Ryūta Yamamoto & Yūichirō Aoki	Takamitsu Kōno	Ryūhei Aoyagi	March 16, 2025
23	11	"Tsundere Lost"; Transliteration: "Ushinawa-reshi Tsundere" (Japanese: 失われしツンデレ)	Kentaro Iino	Takashi Aoshima	Nagisa Miyazaki & Hikaru Sato	March 23, 2025
24	12	"The 100 Girlfriends Who Really, Really, Really, Really, Really Love You (89 to Go)"; Transliteration: "Kimi no Koto ga Dai Dai Dai Dai Daisuki na Hyaku-nin no Kanojo (Ato Hachijūkyū-nin)" (Japanese: 君のことが大大大大大しゅきな100人の彼女（あと89人）)	Ryūta Yamamoto	Takashi Aoshima	Taizo Yoshida	March 30, 2025

=== Season 3 (2026) ===
No. overall	No. in season	Title	Directed by	Written by	Storyboarded by	Original release date
25	1	"Cousin and Girlfriend"; Transliteration: "Itoko no Kanojo" (Japanese: いとこの彼女)	Hikaru Sato & Ryūta Yamamoto	Takashi Aoshima	Hikaru Sato & Shinpei Nagai	July 5, 2026
26	2	"Chiyo's Family Coaching"; Transliteration: "Chiyo-chan no Famirī Shidō" (Japanese: 知与ちゃんのファミリー指導)	Yūichirō Aoki	Takashi Aoshima	Satoshi Shimizu	July 12, 2026
27	3	"The Japanese Teacher Has Blonde Hair"; Transliteration: "Kokugo Kyōshi wa Burondo Hea" (Japanese: 国語教師はブロンドヘア)	Yūichirō Aoki	Takamitsu Kōno	Nagisa Miyazaki	July 19, 2026
28	4	"The Rentaro Family Idol Legend"; Transliteration: "Aidoru Densetsu Rentarō Famirī" (Japanese: アイドル伝説恋太郎ファミリー)	Yū Harumi	Takamitsu Kōno	Yū Harumi	July 26, 2026
29	5	"Yasashiki-san's Gardening Club Tour"; Transliteration: "Yasashiki-san no Engei-bu Tsuā" (Japanese: 優敷さんの園芸部ツアー)	Shingo Tanabe	Yasunori Yamada	Satoshi Shimizu	August 2, 2026
30	6	"Momiji-chan's Squishy Festival"; Transliteration: "Momiji-chan no Momimomi Fesutibaru" (Japanese: 紅葉ちゃんのもみもみフェスティバル)	Ryūta Yamamoto	Yasunori Yamada	Ryūhei Aoyagi	August 9, 2026
31	7	"Thumbelinano and the Kusurivanian Family"; Transliteration: "Issun Nano-shi to Kusuribania Famirī" (Japanese: 一寸凪乃師と楠莉バニアファミリー)	Shingo Tanabe	Takamitsu Kōno	Shinpei Nagai & Royden B	August 16, 2026
32	8	"Kusuri-senpai's Grandmother"; Transliteration: "Kusuri-senpai no Obaa-san" (Japanese: 楠莉先輩のおばあさん)	Yūichirō Aoki	Yasunori Yamada	Royden B & Hikaru Sato	August 23, 2026
33	9	"Hardcore Hot Springs Hopping with a Chance of Heaven"; Transliteration: "Mizugi Honki Onsen Jigoku Meguri Nochi Tengoku" (Japanese: 水着本気温泉地獄めぐりのち天国)	Ryūta Yamamoto	Takamitsu Kōno	Ryūhei Aoyagi	August 30, 2026
34	10	"The Rise and Fall of the Proud Girlfriend"; Transliteration: "Kukkoro Kanojo" (Japanese: くっころ彼女)	Shinya Kawabe	Takamitsu Kōno	Shinya Kawabe	September 6, 2026
35	11	"Of Children, Adults, Ladies, and Mothers"; Transliteration: "Kodomo mo, Otona mo, Onēsan mo, Okāsan mo" (Japanese: こどもも、おとなも、おねーさんも、おかーさんも。)	Yūichirō Aoki & Yūki Gotō	Takashi Aoshima	Shinpei Nagai & Yūki Gotō	September 13, 2026
36	12	"The 17 Girlfriends Who I Really, Really, Really, Really, Really Love (83 to Go)"; Transliteration: "Ore no Dai Dai Dai Dai Daisuki na Jūnana-nin no Kanojo (Ato Hachijūsan-nin)" (Japanese: 俺の大大大大大好きな17人の彼女（あと83人）)	Yūki Gotō, Yūichirō Aoki & Hikaru Sato	Takashi Aoshima	Yūki Gotō, Satoshi Shimizu & Hikaru Sato	September 20, 2026
