= Suga Shrine (Shinjuku) =

Shinto shrine in Tokyo, Japan

- 須賀神社
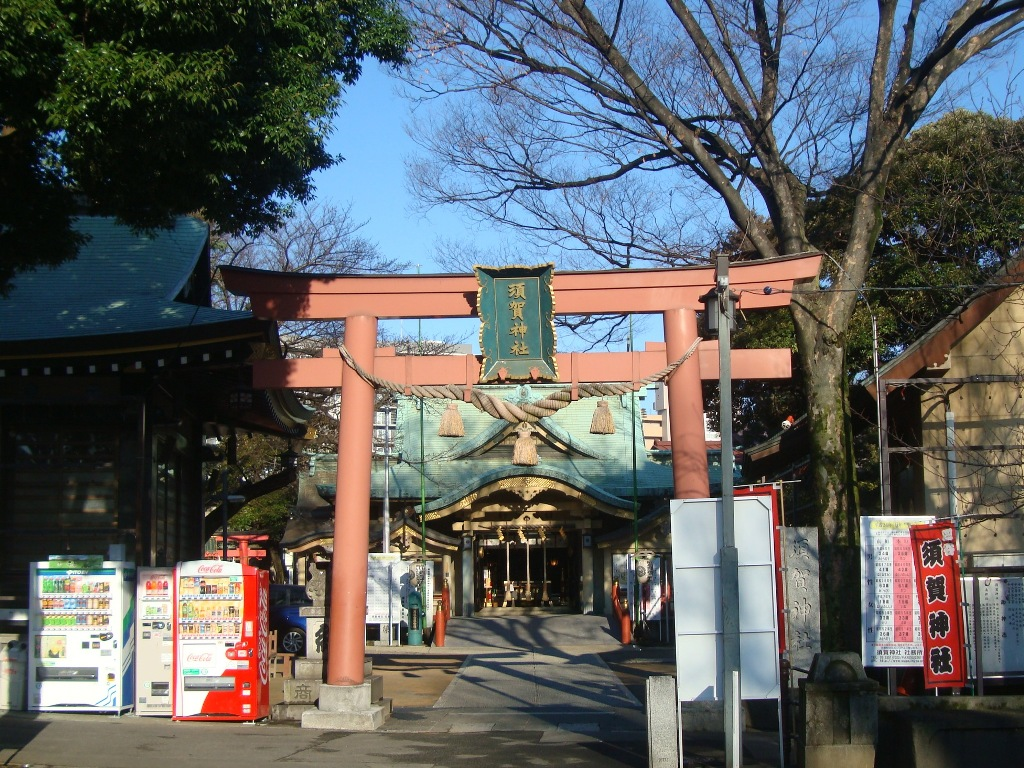
- The shrine's torii (gate; foreground) and haiden (worship hall; background)

Religion
- Affiliation: Shinto
- Deity: Inari Ōkami and Susanoo-no-Mikoto

Location
- Location: Yotsuya, Shinjuku, Tokyo, Japan
- Interactive map of Suga Shrine
- Coordinates: 35°41′7.1″N 139°43′20.8″E

Suga Shrine (Japanese: 須賀神社, Hepburn: Suga jinja) is a Shinto shrine in the Shinjuku ward of Tokyo, Japan. It enshrines two kami – Inari Ōkami and Susanoo-no-Mikoto – and is the guardian shrine of 18 towns in Yotsuya. It was moved to its current location in the early 17th century and took on its current name in 1868. The shrine was severely damaged in the 1945 bombing of Tokyo and was not fully restored until 1989.

A staircase on the premises of the shrine is a popular destination for fans of the 2016 film Your Name, the closing scene of which takes place there.

== History ==
According to its shinshoku (clergy members), Suga Shrine has existed since ancient times and was originally Inari Shrine, a shrine housing Inari Ōkami, the kami of agriculture and industry. It was moved from Shimizudani to its present location in Yotsuya in the early 17th century. In 1637, Susanoo-no-Mikoto was added as a principal kami and is now revered by worshippers as the kami of construction and civil engineering, as well as a protector against evil spirits and natural disasters. Inari Ōkami and Susanoo-no-Mikoto have since been the two principal kami of the shrine. From August 1814 to December 1828, new shrine structures were built, although existing ones had been in good condition. The shrine changed its name to Suga Shrine in 1868 and was promoted to the rank of village shrine in 1872.

During World War II, an air raid over Tokyo on 24 May 1945 started a fire that heavily damaged the shrine. The honden (main hall), naijin (inner sanctuary), and setsumatsusha (auxiliary shrines) survived the blaze, but the shrine was not fully restored until 9 May 1989.

Suga Shrine is currently the guardian shrine of 18 towns in Yotsuya.

== Staircase ==
A staircase on the premises of Suga Shrine was popularized by the 2016 film Your Name, which ends with a shot of the protagonists reuniting at the stairs. Promotional posters for the film also used the staircase as a key visual. Many fans of Your Name visit and take photographs of the staircase, and leave ema (wooden plaques) with wishes at the shrine.

== Gallery ==
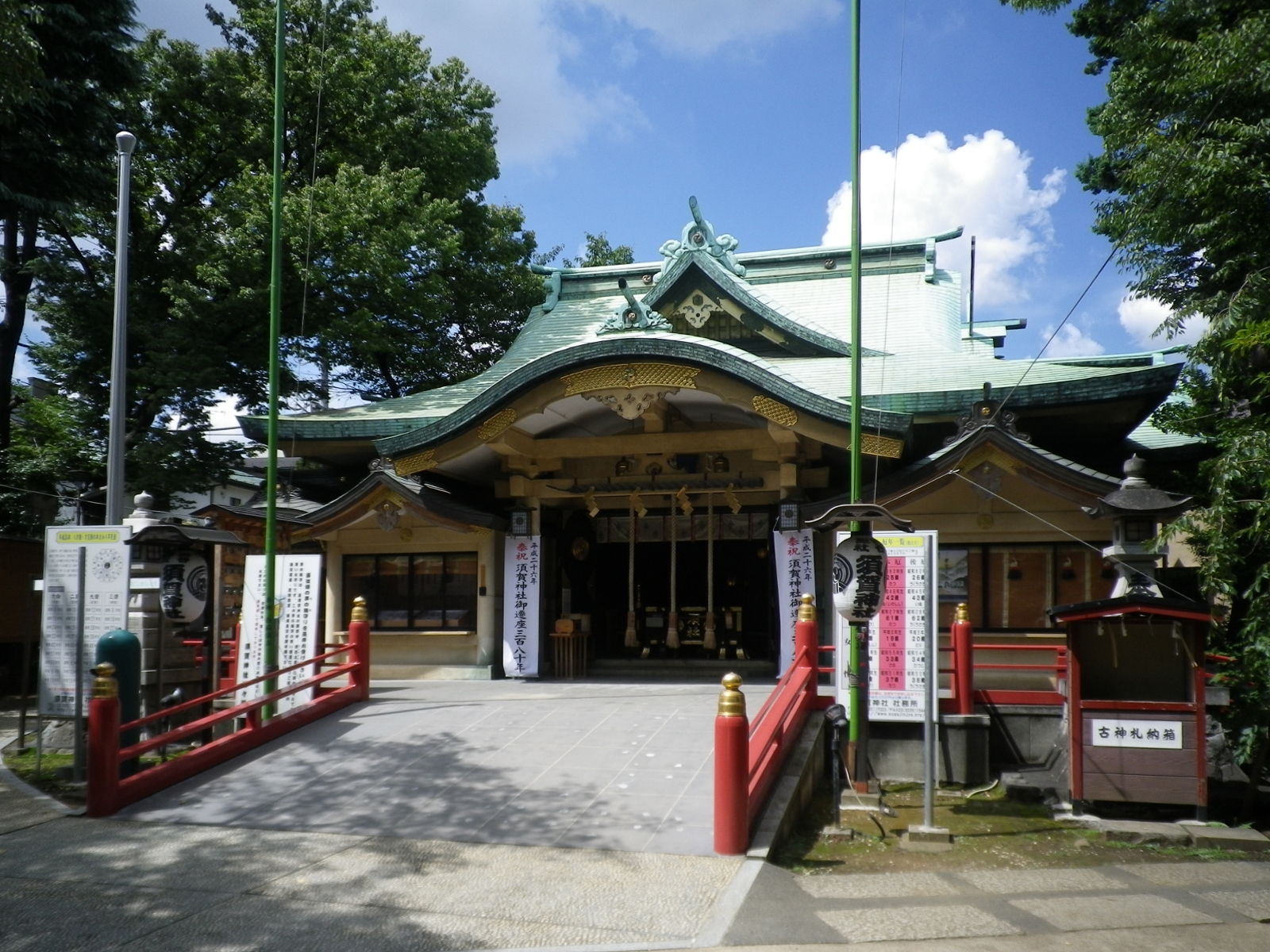
The shrine's haiden (worship hall)

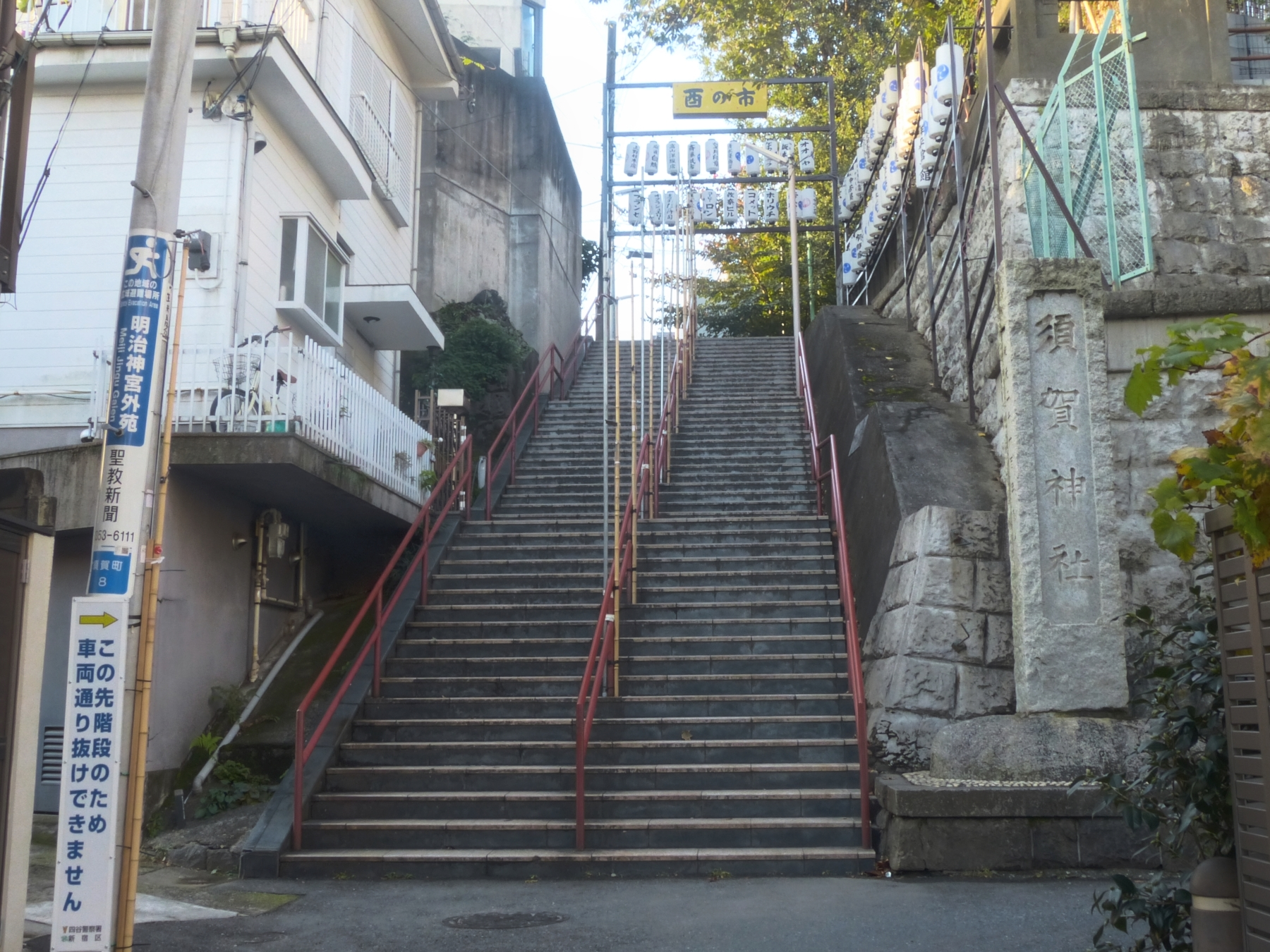
The shrine's staircase

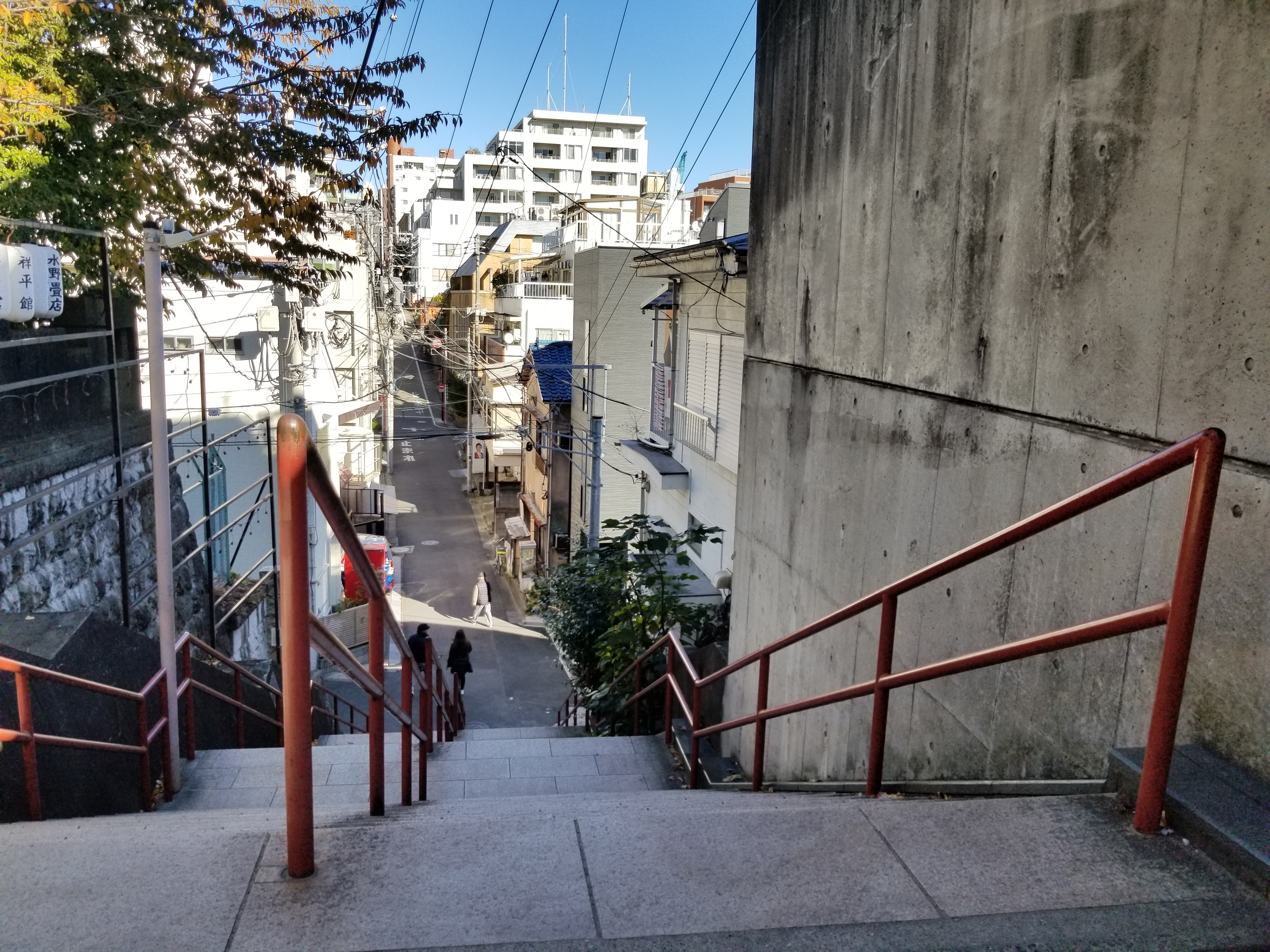
The view from the top of the staircase, similar to its depiction in Your Name

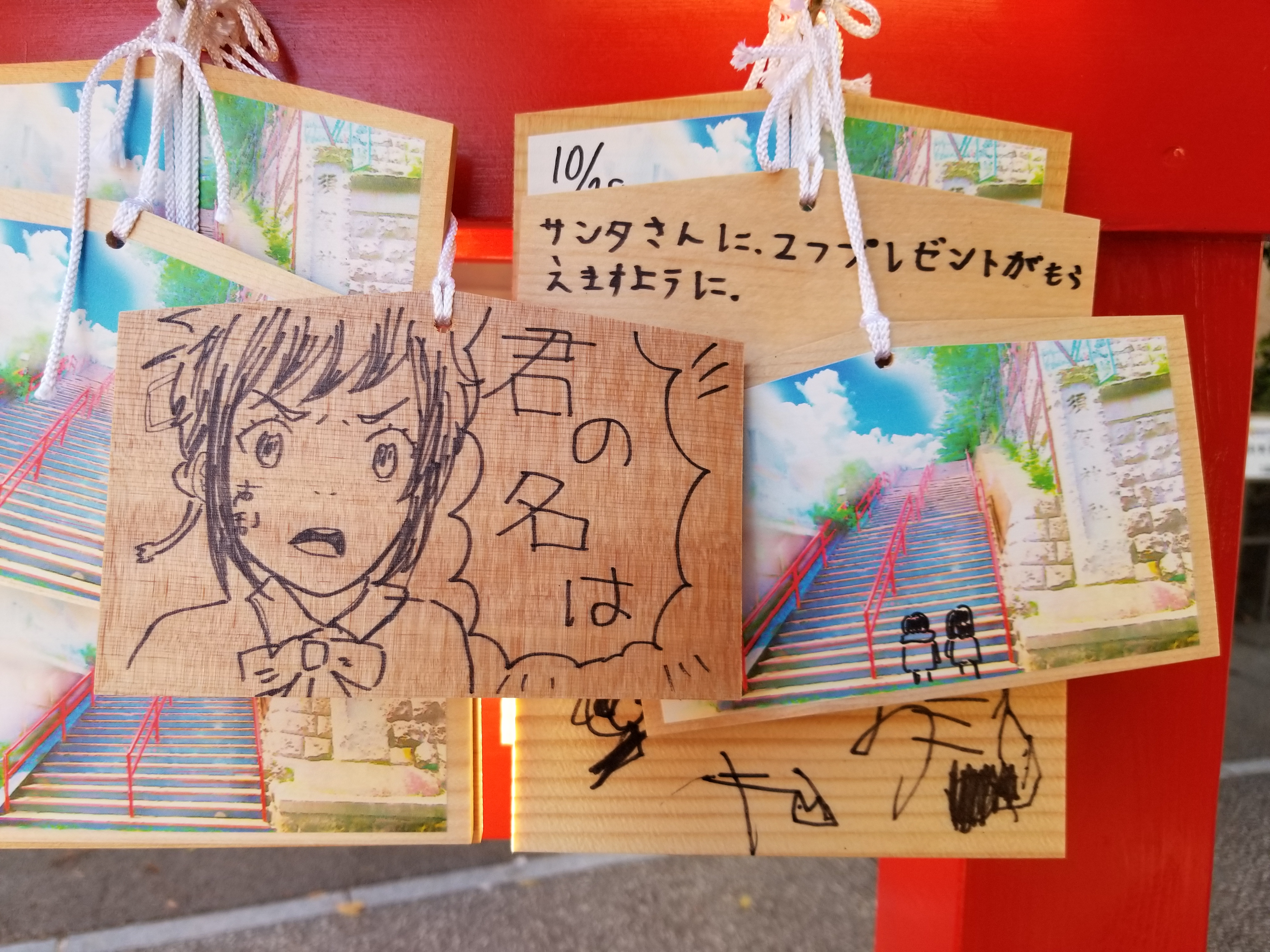
Ema referencing the film
