= List of Tokyopop publications =

Tokyopop (styled TOKYOPOP; formerly known as Mixx Entertainment) is an American distributor, licensor and publisher of anime, manga, manhwa and Western manga-style works.

== Books published in English by Tokyopop ==
Unless otherwise noted all titles listed in this section are out of print.

=== Manga ===
Besides the abbreviated list below, many titles may be found within Category:Tokyopop titles.

At various times in its history, Tokyopop has published books under the Pocket Mixx, Mixx Manga Premium Edition, Chix Comix, TOKYOPOP manga, and TOKYOPOP imprints.

==== Popular shōnen manga series ====
- Beck (Now published by ComiXology)
- Bus Gamer
- A Gentle Noble's Vacation Recommendation
- GetBackers
- Girls Bravo
- GTO (Now published by Kodansha USA)
- Love Hina (Now published by Kodansha USA)
- Pita Ten
- Rave Master (Now published by Kodansha USA)
- Saiyuki (Now published by Kodansha USA)
- Saiyuki Reload
- Samurai Deeper Kyo (Now published by Del Rey Manga)
- Sengoku Youko
- Sgt. Frog (Now published by Viz Media)

==== Popular shōjo manga series ====
- Cardcaptor Sakura (Now published by Kodansha USA)
- Fruits Basket (Now published by Yen Press)
- Gakuen Alice
- How I Attended an All-Guy's Mixer
- Kare Kano: His and Her Circumstances
- Magic Knight Rayearth (Now published by Kodansha USA)
- Marmalade Boy (Now published by Seven Seas Entertainment)
- Peach Girl
- Pixie Pop
- Sailor Moon (Now published by Kodansha USA)
- Tokyo Mew Mew (Now published by Kodansha USA)
- Vampire Game

==== Popular seinen manga series ====
- Ai Yori Aoshi
- Battle Royale
- Battle Vixens
- Blame! (Now published by Vertical)
- Chobits (Now published by Kodansha USA)
- The Devil's in the Lunch Deals
- If My Favorite Pop Idol Made It to the Budokan, I Would Die
- Lupin III
- Mobile Suit Gundam titles
- Planetes (Now published by Dark Horse Comics)

==== Popular josei manga series ====
- Dazzle
- Double
- Happy Mania
- The Margrave's Daughter & the Enemy Prince
- Since I Could Die Tomorrow
- A Smart and Courageous Child
- Tramps Like Us (republished digitally by comixology)

=== Manhwa ===
- Angel Cup
- Arcana
- ArchLord
- Aspirin
- Ark Angels
- Blazin' Barrels
- Bird Kiss
- Blade of Heaven
- Chronicles of the Cursed Sword
- Chrono Code (Riverside)
- Ciel
- Crazy Love Story
- Demon Diary
- Dragon Hunter
- Faeries' Landing
- Good Luck
- Heaven Above Heaven
- Honey Mustard
- I Wish
- iD eNTITY
- In Dream World
- I.N.V.U.
- Island
- Kill Me, Kiss Me
- King of Hell
- Les Bijoux
- Lights Out
- Love or Money or Money
- One
- Phantom
- PhD: Phantasy Degree
- Priest
- The Tarot Café
- The Queen's Knight
- Threads of Time
- Ragnarok
- Rebirth
- Rure
- Saver
- Snow Drop
- Under the Glass Moon
- Unnie, I Like You!
- Visitor
- Warcraft: The Sunwell Trilogy

=== Manhua ===
- Digimon: Digital Monsters
- She Is Still Cute Today

=== Original English-language manga ===
- @Large
- The Abandoned
- Afterlife
- A Midnight Opera
- Bad Kitty
- Bizenghast
- Boys of Summer
- CSI: Crime Scene Investigation
- Dæmonium (2008)
- The Dark Goodbye
- Dogby Walks Alone
- Dramacon
- Earthlight
- eV
- The Faerie Path: Lamia's Revenge
- Fool's Gold
- Ghostbusters
- Idiotz!
- I Luv Halloween
- Juror 13
- Legends of the Dark Crystal
- Mail Order Ninja
- Mark of the Succubus
- My Dead Girlfriend
- MBQ
- My Cat Loki
- Off Beat
- Orange Crows
- Pantheon High
- Peach Fuzz
- Psy-Comm
- RE:Play
- Return to Labyrinth
- Rhysmyth
- Riding Shotgun
- Rising Stars of Manga
- Roadsong
- Sea Princess Azuri
- ShutterBox
- Snow
- Sokora Refugees
- Sorcerers & Secretaries
- Star Trek
- Steady Beat
- The Dreaming
- The Ocean of Secrets
- Undertown
- Van Von Hunter
- War on Flesh
- Warcraft: Death Knight
- Warcraft: Legends
- Warcraft: The Sunwell Trilogy (manhwa)
- Warriors Manga
- "We Shadows" by Sonny Strait
- Wicked Lovely: Desert Tales
- Work Bites
- World of Hartz
- Parham Itan: Tales From Beyond
- Dirty Darling
- Dekoboko Sugar Days
- RePlay

=== Love x Love imprint ===
- Alter Ego
- Boys Gilding the Lily Shall Die!?
- Confessions of a Shy Baker
- Dekoboko Bittersweet Days
- Fangs
- Her Royal Highness Seems to Be Angry
- If My Favorite Pop Idol Made It to the Budokan, I Would Die
- My Coworker Has a Secret!
- On or Off
- Our Not-So-Lonely Planet Travel Guide
- Still Sick
- Yuri Espoir

=== Original German-language manga ===
- Gothic Sports
- Plastic Chew (released in Germany as Prussian Blue)
- Yonen Buzz
- Goldfisch
- Breath of Flowers
- Blue Lust
- Mädchen in all ihren Farben
- Citrus+
- Fragtime

=== Novels ===
- .hack//AI buster
- .hack//Another Birth
- The Adventures of Duan Surk
- Clamp School Paranormal Investigators
- Chain Mail
- Chibi Vampire
- Crest of the Stars
- Gravitation
- Gundam Seed
- Kino no Tabi
- Love Hina
- Magic Moon
- Sailor Moon
- Scrapped Princess
- Slayers (now published by J-Novel Club)
- Trinity Blood
- Twelve Kingdoms
- Full Metal Panic!
- Welcome to the NHK

=== Cine-Manga ===
- The Adventures of Jimmy Neutron, Boy Genius
- Akira
- Aladdin
- All Grown Up!
- The Amanda Show
- Astro Boy
- Avatar: The Last Airbender
- Bambi
- Linkin Park: Breaking the Habit
- Buffy the Vampire Slayer
- Cardcaptors
- Cars
- Code Lyoko
- Drake & Josh
- The Fairly OddParents
- Family Guy
- Finding Nemo
- G.I. Joe: Spy Troops
- Greatest Stars of the NBA
- The Incredibles
- Jackie Chan Adventures
- Kim Possible
- Lilo & Stitch: The Series
- Lizzie McGuire
- Madagascar
- Malcolm in the Middle
- Monsters, Inc.
- Power Rangers: Ninja Storm
- Rave Master
- Shrek 2
- Star Wars
- The Simple Life
- SpongeBob SquarePants
- Spy Kids
- The Suite Life of Zack & Cody
- Teenage Mutant Ninja Turtles
- That's So Raven
- Totally Spies
- Transformers Armada
- Yo Gabba Gabba!

=== Picture books ===
- Stray Sheep

== Soundtracks ==
- Chrono Trigger Official Soundtrack
- Final Fantasy IV Official Soundtrack
- Final Fantasy: N Generation - Official Best Collection
- Final Fantasy: S Generation - Official Best Collection
- Final Fantasy IX: Uematsu's Best Selection
- Final Fantasy X: Official Soundtrack
- Trigun Spicy Stewed Donut
- Sonic Adventure 2 Soundtrack

== Anime licensed in English by Tokyopop ==
- Brigadoon [TV-PG]
- Great Teacher Onizuka [TV-PG/TV-14] (Now licensed by Discotek Media)
- Initial D [TV-PG] (Now licensed by Funimation)
- Marmalade Boy [TV-PG] (Now licensed by Discotek Media)
- Psychic Academy [TV-PG]
- Rave Master [TV-Y7 FV]
- Samurai Girl: Real Bout High School [TV-PG V]
- Reign: The Conqueror [TV-14]
- Saint Tail [TV-Y7] (Now licensed by Discotek Media)
- Spring and Chaos [TV-PG]
- Vampire Princess Miyu [TV-14] (Now licensed by Maiden Japan)

== Frontier Martial-Arts Wrestling ==
Tokyopop has also produced a number of Frontier Martial-Arts Wrestling (FMW) videos in the US. So far they have produced 14 volumes featuring different matches from the now-defunct wrestling organization.

- Volume 1- FMW: The Legend Dawns
- Volume 2- FMW: King of the Death Match
- Volume 3- FMW: Crash and Burn
- Volume 4- FMW: Total Carnage
- Volume 5- FMW: Ring of Torture
- Volume 6- FMW: Torn Shreds
- Volume 7- FMW: Yokohama Deathmatch
- Volume 8- FMW: Flying Assassin
- Volume 9- FMW: International Slaughter House
- Volume 10- FMW: The Judgement
- Volume 11- FMW: The Enforcer
- Volume 12- FMW: War of Attrition
- Volume 13- FMW: Rule The Asylum
- Volume 14- FMW: Final Encounter

Vol 1-6 contain scripted commentary with Eric Gellar and John Watanabe hosting and doing play-by-play, the volumes also have alternate Japanese commentary. Vol 7-14 replaces Eric Gellar with Dan Lovranski and the extra Japanese commentary is removed aside from the DVD extras.

== Books published in German by Tokyopop ==
=== Manga ===
- +Anima
- 100% Strawberry
- Aqua
- Azumanga Daioh
- Bakuman.
- Beck
- Beelzebub
- Bleach
- Blue Dragon Ral Grado
- Bobobo-bo Bo-bobo
- Boogiepop Dual
- Buso Renkin
- Butterfly
- Cherry Juice
- Chonchu
- Ciel
- Comic Party
- Confidential Confessions
- Crazy for You
- Crescent Moon
- Crimson Spell
- Cromartie High School
- Dance in the Vampire Bund
- Nijigahara Holograph (as Das Feld des Regenbogens)
- Dazzle
- D.Gray-man
- D.V.D.
- Deadman Wonderland (Only 1-5)
- Death Note
- DearS
- Devil May Cry 3 (Manga)
- Glass Wings (as Der Prinz mit den gläsernen Schwingen)
- Desert Coral
- DOLL
- Lament of the Lamb (as Das Lied der Lämmer)
- Your and My Secret (as Dein und mein Geheimnis)
- Elfen Lied
- Emma
- Strawberry Marshmallow (as Erdbeeren & Marshmallows)
- Evergrey
- Extra Heavy Syrup
- Finder Series
- A Foreign Love Affair
- Beyond the Beyond (as Futabas (höchst) seltsame Reise)
- Fruits Basket
- Gata Pishi
- Ren'ai Shijō Shugi (as Gib mir Liebe!)
- Gintama
- Gravitation EX
- Grenadier
- Grimms Manga
- Happy Lesson
- Honey and Clover
- Honey x Honey Drops
- Katekyō Hitman Reborn! (as Reborn!)
- Little Butterfly (as Kleiner Schmetterling)
- Kedamono Damono Synopsis (as Kleines Biest)
- Challengers (as Küss mich, Student!)
- Kodocha
- The Legend of Zelda
- Shiiku Hime (as Lektionen der Liebe)
- Love Triangle
- Manga Trainer
- Meine Liebe
- Metamo Kiss
- The First King Adventure (as Der kleine König Valum)
- Ibara no Ō (as König der Dornen)
- A Girl on the Shore (as Mädchen am Strand)
- Pandora Hearts
- The Prince of Tennis
- Rosario + Vampire
- Rosario + Vampire Season II
- Rozen Maiden
- Maria-sama ga Miteru (as Rosen unter Marias Obhut)
- Sgt. Frog
- St. Dragon Girl
- St. Dragon Girl Miracle
- Uchi no Tantei Shirimasen ka (as Suspicious (F)acts)
- Ultra Cute
- Vassalord.
- What a Wonderful World!
- Yotsuba&!
- Zombiepowder
- Erica Sakurazawa
  - Between the Sheets
  - Angel
  - Angel Nest
  - The Rules of Love
  - Nothing But Loving You
  - The Aromatic Bitters I
  - The Aromatic Bitters II
  - Angel Town

=== Manhwa ===
- Ami, Queen of Hearts
- ArchLord
- Ark Angels
- Banya
- Crazy Love Story
- Demon Diary
- Devil's Bride
- Die 11. Katze
- Die Legenden vom Traumhändler
- Faeries' Landing
- Fantamir
- I.N.V.U.
- King of Hell
- Kumiho
- Legend
- Les Bijoux
- Love Virus

=== Manhua ===
- Bye Bye Baby!
- Comic Schule
- The Flower Ring
- Sweet As Candy
- White Night Melody

=== Original English-language manga ===
- @Large
- A Midnight Opera
- Bizenghast
- Dramacon
- I Luv Halloween
- Peach Fuzz
- ShutterBox
- Sokora Refugees

=== Original German-language manga ===
- Gothic Sports
- In The end
- Iscel
- Krähen
- Life Tree's Guardian
- Manga-Fieber
- Sketchbook Berlin
- Struwwelpeter: Das große Buch der Störenfriede
- Struwwelpeter: Die Rückkehr
- Tränen eines Engels
- Yonen Buzz

== Books published in Japanese by Tokyopop ==
=== Manga ===
- Star Wars Manga Black (スター・ウォーズ×マンガ【黒】, Sutā Wōzu Manga [Kuro])
- Star Wars Manga Silver (スター・ウォーズ×マンガ【銀】, Sutā Wōzu Manga [Gin])

=== Cine-Manga ===
- Star Wars Episodes I–VI
- Madagascar (マダガスカル, Madagasukaru)
