= A Midnight Opera =

Original English-language manga

- Cover of A Midnight Opera vol. 1 (2005), art by Hans Steinbach
- Genre: Horror
- Author: Hans Steinbach
- Publisher: (United States) (Canada) Tokyopop
- Demographic: Teens
- Original run: 2005–2006
- Volumes: 3

A Midnight Opera is an original English-language (OEL) manga by Hans Steinbach. It was published by Tokyopop in North America from November 8, 2005 to November 7, 2006.

== Plot ==
The series focuses on two brothers, Ein and Leroux DeLaLune.

== Development ==
Born in Syria, Hans Steinbach lived in many countries, including Germany, France, Turkey and Canada, before moving to the United States; there, he decided to submit a story idea to Tokyopop after seeing it was a major publisher in the States. Steinbach considered the story "a little too straight forward, too linear". Because it heavily focused on the missions Einblick carried out for the Catholic Church, Steinbech rewrote it, with help from his editor at Tokyopop, to allow Einblick's personality to develop. He changed Einblick from an assassin to "an undead, chain-smoking metalhead with a grudge". Steinbach was inspired by Phantom of the Opera, since it combined horror and music, something Steinbach wanted to do for A Midnight Opera. His goal for the series was "to combine fact and fiction, historical facts with fictitious (and not so fictitious) characters".

Steinbach has been drawing since the age of ten and his art is influenced by manga artists, particularly Go Nagai and Akira Toriyama. Additionally, he is influenced by classical and metal music as well as the musician Yngwie Malmsteen and the bands Dark Moor, Metallica, Symphony X, Iron Maiden, Stratovarius, Blind Guardian, Rhapsody, and Judas Priest.

== Media ==
=== OEL manga ===
Written and illustrated by Hans Steinbach, A Midnight Opera was published in North America by Tokyopop from November 8, 2005 to November 7, 2006. However, as of August 31, 2009, the series is out-of-print. In New Zealand and Australia, the series is distributed by Madman Entertainment. The series is also licensed in Germany by Tokyopop Germany, and in Hungary by Mangattack.

=== Volume list ===
No.	Release date	ISBN
01	November 8, 2005	978-1-59816-265-3
02	April 11, 2006	978-1-59816-471-8
03	November 7, 2006	978-1-4278-0007-7

=== Animated shorts ===
Menfond Electronic Art adapted A Midnight Opera into animated short episodes. The episodes premiered on My Space along with the short episodes of Bizenghast, I Luv Halloween, and Riding Shotgun in summer 2007.

== Reception ==
A Midnight Opera received mixed reviews from critics. About.com's Katherine Luther praised the series as "a gothic horror manga full of thrills, chills and okay, a little gore" and more appropriate for older readers. While noting that the plot and art lacked originality, KJB of IGN stated: "Steinbach has managed to take all of those elements and create a final product that is interesting enough to sit through until the last page." Manga Life's Craig Johnson commented on the "brave and experimental" art and that "the story is not as revolutionary as the art...neither is it accessible." Zac Bertschy of Anime News Network heavily criticized the series as "[h]orrifically clichéd and hackneyed, with laughably bad dialogue and interior art", and wrote: "It's hard to tell if A Midnight Opera is an exercise in plain marketing hubris—pandering directly to the Hot Topic crowd—or simply a case of the author taking himself and his work far too seriously and churning out cliché after cliché, convinced of his own genius, unaware of the tripe he's created."
