= Eric Wight =

American comics artist

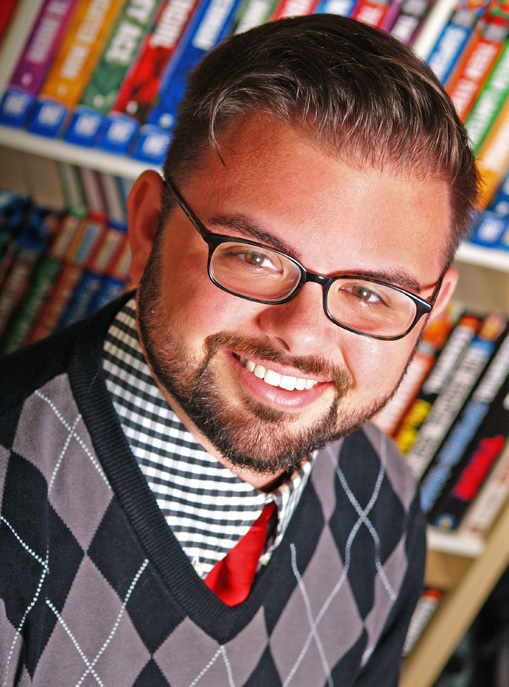
- Born: November 15, 1974 (age 52)
- Area: Artist

Eric Wight (born November 15, 1974) is an American professional writer, illustrator and animator. He was the Director of Epic! Originals at children's digital reading platform Epic.

He graduated from the School of Visual Arts and lives in Winter Garden, Florida with his wife and children.

== Career ==
Wight is the author of the manga, My Dead Girlfriend. He illustrated the comic book adaptation of Michael Chabon's Pulitzer Prize winning novel The Amazing Adventures of Kavalier and Clay. He was the recipient of the 2004 Russ Manning Award.

He is perhaps best known as the 'ghost artist' for television character, Seth Cohen on the former Fox TV series The OC and is the creator of 'Atomic County'. For the HBO TV show Six Feet Under he created the fake vintage comic "Blue Twister".

Wight was also an animator, working with Warner Bros. during the heyday of their animated output, working on such cartoons as Superman: The Animated Series, Batman Beyond, and others.

== Works ==
=== Books ===
==== Frankie Pickle Series ====
- Frankie Pickle and the Closet of Doom (writer/illustrator, 2009)
- Frankie Pickle and the Pine Run 3000 (writer/illustrator, 2010)
- Frankie Pickle and the Mathematical Menace (writer/illustrator, 2011)

==== The Adventures of Caveboy Series ====
- The Adventures of Caveboy (illustrator, Aug 2017)
- Caveboy is Bored! (illustrator, Aug 2017)
- Caveboy is a Hit! (illustrator, Dec 2017)

==== The Magic Shop Series ====
- The Vanishing Coin (illustrator, April 2014)
- The Incredible Twisting Arm (illustrator, April 2014)
- The Great Escape (illustrator, October 2014)
- The Disappearing Magician (illustrator, June 2015)

==== A Topps League Series ====
- Jinxed! (illustrator, April 2012)
- Steal that Base! (illustrator, April 2012)
- Zip It! (illustrator, Sept 2012)
- The 823rd Hit (illustrator, Sept 2012)

=== Picture Books ===
- Everyone Loves Bacon (illustrator, 2015)
- Everyone Loves Cupcake (illustrator, 2016)

=== Graphic novels ===
- My Dead Girlfriend (writer/illustrator, 2007)
- Comics Squad: Recess! (writer/illustrator, 2014)

=== Comic books ===
- Totally Super Squad #1-5 (writer, 2021)
- Buffy the Vampire Slayer Season Eight #20 (art supervisor)
- Justice League of America #0 & #12 (interior); #7 (cover/layouts)
- Spike vs. Dracula #1-4 (covers)
- Action Comics Annual #10 (interiors)
- The Goon #9 (interiors)
- The Legion #25 (interiors)
- JLA - Z #3 (pin-up)
- The Amazing Adventures of the Escapist #1 & #5
- Hellboy Weird Tales #2

=== Television ===
- The O.C. (ghost artist of Seth Cohen and creator of The Atomic County)
- Six Feet Under (illustrated The Blue Twister Golden Age comic book in Episode #48: "Grinding the Corn")
- Buffy: The Animated Series (character designer and art director)
