= Hans Steinbach =

German comic book artist

- Born: Damascus, Syria
- Areas: Writer, Artist
- Pseudonym: Hanzo

Hans Steinbach (Hanzo) is a German comic book artist, born in Damascus, Syria to a German father and a Syrian mother. He draws in a contemporary/gothic manga style. He has had no formal training as an artist, but has an elegant style that has been formed through being raised travelling around the world with his family. Hans has lived in Syria, Canada, Marseille, France, Bonn, Germany, Beirut, Lebanon, Ankara, Turkey, Montreal, Quebec and most recently Beverly Hills, California.

== Style ==
His art in his first published novel, A Midnight Opera stands out against other styles, due to his misshapen bodies and the style in which he deceits their movement. This has been frowned upon at times, but has won over the majority of his audience.

During the time he worked on Poison Candy he was described as:

still at the raw and awkward stage in terms of drawing for graphic storytelling. Hanzo has some kinks to work out in cartooning human anatomy, basic figure drawing, depicting figures in motion, and posing and placing characters in environments, especially when drawing more than one character in a panel or scene. Still, Hanzo is both stylish and strong on the substance of storytelling.

== Bibliography ==
- A Midnight Opera
  (2005–2006, Tokyopop, 3 volumes)
- Poison Candy (2007) with Marvel comics' David Hine, a comic about the near future where the SKAR virus selects random teenagers, giving them super powers, but also a death sentence. When the government and the private sector both set out to find a cure for the virus, their humanitarian effort belies a power race that could set up an entirely new world order. It follows the journey of young Sam Chance, who finds himself SKAR-positive. What could be the imminent end of his life just might be the beginning of an entirely different world for him. Hans was the penciller, inker and cover artist.

Also, he is the cover artist of the Ghostbusters novel, Ghost Busted (2008), the graphic novel released after the film.
