= Roadsong =

OEL manga

Roadsong is an original English-language manga written by Allan Gross, illustrated by Joanna Estep, and published by Tokyopop.

== Characters ==
Monty McBride:

Monty McBride is a big man on campus, the heartthrob at Segovia High School. He's got good looks. He's a natural athlete. He's also a good guitarist and singer-songwriter with confidence that makes him a natural on stage. If he has a fatal flaw, it is that he's never had a true friend, and he doesn't really know what he wants to do with his life. Then, a tragic accident turns everything on its head, and Simon, who he couldn't stand before, may be the only one he can trust.

Simon Smallwood:

In spite of his punk-rock looks, to Simon, life should make sense and be logical; everything should be fair and equitable. He loves mathematics, and for the same reason, the complexity of music, particularly classical music. The patterns and processes simply make sense! However, Simon has a lot to learn about life, and about people. Monty's ability to create songs on the fly is both baffling and intriguing to him.

Jake McBride:

Monty's father, who is pragmatic without being particularly practical. He raised Monty on a diet of baseball and baseball aphorisms, which turns out to be useful in unexpected ways.

Harley Kyle:

A failed actress turned "bad cop," Kyle loves honesty and birds and has little tolerance for the corruption of the world around her, even as she immerses herself in it. She makes her deal with Yamada when she sees an opportunity to get rich and out of her current situation.

Yamada:

The mysterious man in sunglasses who appears to be behind the disaster that destroys Monty and Simon's lives. He seeks revenge on Jake McBride, but even Kyle, who is aiding him, isn't sure exactly why.
