= Off Beat (comics) =

Manga series

- Cover of Off*beat vol. 1 (2005), art by Jennifer Lee Quick
- Genre: Drama, Romance, Boys love
- Author: Jennifer Lee Quick
- Publisher: (Australia) (New Zealand) Madman Entertainment (Canada) (United States) Tokyopop eBOOK Initiative Japan(eBook only); Chromatic Press (Volume 3 and reprints of Volume 1 & 2)
- Original run: 2005–2014
- Volumes: 3

Off*beat is an original English-language manga authored by Jennifer Lee Quick, first released September 13, 2005. It is both licensed and published by Tokyopop. The style of its writing and illustration is heavily influenced by urban culture and the fantasy genre. While critical reception to Off Beat has been largely positive, with praise from sources like ForeWord Magazine, it has received some negative criticism for being a stylistic oddity among Japanese manga and OEL manga.

Set in Queens, New York City, Off Beat follows the exploits of Christopher "Tory" Blake, a bright and disenfranchised fifteen-year-old who amuses himself by taking endless notes in a notebook about what he sees and hears each day. Usually a loner, Tory becomes infatuated with the boy who moves in next door in the middle of the night, and devotes all his time to learning what the new boy, Colin Stephens, is hiding.

== History ==
While living in Queens, New York, Jennifer Lee Quick began drawing up ideas for Off Beat. A BFA in animation, she approached Tokyopop when the company was doing portfolio reviews for students and graduates at the School of Visual Arts. Originally, she had intended for the manga to be a joint project with her best friend, Becky Cloonan, but Quick was forced to fly solo due to conflicts with Cloonan's schedule.

"They liked what they saw, and asked me to send them a pitch sometime. At the time, I was working on Once in a Blue Moon so I didn't have time to send a pitch. When I finished that project, my long time best friend, Becky Cloonan was contacted by Tokyopop to send a pitch proposal. I remembered that I had been asked to send one as well, so we briefly considered sending a joint proposal for Off Beat (at the time she had talked about possibly working on the project with me). Her schedule got booked though, so I wasn't sure about submitting the pitch on my own. She encouraged me to go ahead though, so I went for it."

It was during September 2004 that Quick officially began working with Tokyopop on bringing Off Beat to shelves, having decided that there would only be three books in her series, making it the shortest story she has ever conceived. On the subject of her work, she has stated:

"I thought I would like to write a story that takes place in the city but without trying to be gritty/edgy, or overly glamorized...Something kind of everyday but a bit quirky and fun."

In an early conception of the story, all characters wore school uniforms. The names of the protagonists were selected arbitrarily, but their birthdates were meant to be somewhat methodical.

The first chapter of Volume 1 was previewed in a 2005 edition of Tokyopop's quarterly Manga magazine (then known as Takuhai). A live presentation of the same chapter is also available through Tokyopop's Manga Online feature, Mangapods, though Quick herself denies being part of the project due to lack of communication.

=== Production ===
Off Beat is hand-drawn by Quick on Bristol paper with mechanical pencil, micron pens, India ink and brush. Initially, toning was done by hand, but issues with moiré led Quick to screentone using Adobe Photoshop, with each page checked by her editor in light of persistent problems. While freelancing for Central Park Media, she found lettering with Adobe Illustrator frustrating, and opted to have Tokyopop's Vanessa Satone oversee the process for Off Beat instead.

== Themes and structure ==
Numerous fantasy sequences appear throughout Off Beat. These panels from Volume 2 show Tory exploring new terrain during one of his daydreams.

Much of Off Beat's tone is derived from its relation to urban culture. The fictional version of New York City that Quick has constructed is incredibly rich in detail, with attention to minuscule factors such as street addresses and subway/bus commute schedules. Often, the establishing shots of a scene will concentrate on landscape to capture in essence how a given area affects or portrays characters within that scene. Examples include shots of busy traffic and corner stores, Tory's messy room, and a dilapidated park. References are made to such problems as gang warfare, counterfeiting, illegal immigration, arms dealing, and terrorism in the form of bomb threats. Conspiracy theory and hacker subculture are also subjects that are explored. Editor Lillian Diaz-Przybyl has commented:

"It features a spot-on, great depiction of New York. Everything Fake does wrong with setting, this does right. The location sets a brilliant backdrop for a really great story with a smart Walter Mitty twist, and cute guys to boot! It's truly manga with an American sensibility. The character designs are unique and appealing, the romance is sweet and understated, and it actually looks like Queens, which makes me really happy."

Off Beat is divided into chapters. Each volume is made up of six cumulative chapters (i.e. Chapter 6 carries over from Volume 1 into Chapter 7 at the beginning of Volume 2). Preceding the very first chapter of the series is a short prelude which establishes Tory's overanalytic attitude and motivation, with Chapter 1 leaping a time span of 347 days. In contrast to the prelude which looks back a full year, there is an epilogue at the end of Chapter 18 which takes a glance into the future for the main characters. Several chapter headings and pages not directly linked to the storyline make use of monochromatic versions of Off Beat illustrations that Quick has produced independent of her work on the manga.

== Plot ==
Off Beat's story begins with Tory's first encounter with Colin. While out running errands, he catches Colin and Dr. Garrets as they move in across the street. Almost a year later, Tory convinces his mother to pull him from public school and send him to St. Peter's, where he expects to be more academically challenged. This is, however, merely an orchestration to get closer to Colin, who also happens to attend the same institution.

While Tory generally has an over-active imagination, Colin truly has secrets to conceal. After bribing Paul into tracking down a license plate number for him, Tory discovers that Colin and his guardian are somehow connected to something known as the "Gaia Project," which may or may not be responsible for episodes of sickness that the boy experiences. Behind the guise of a student council member, Tory offers peer tutoring sessions to students whose conduct is below what is considered acceptable, thereby dragging Colin into his scheme along with his newfound friend, Mandy.

As their study sessions grow more frequent, Colin starts to treat Tory more like a friend. The boys pursue private outings, but their closeness indirectly results in Tory running into trouble with his mother, Paul, and Mandy, though they are ultimately reconciled when Tory admits to errors on his part. Paul's hard drive is mysteriously hacked, but key bits of information concerning the Gaia Project manage to be salvaged. In order to investigate just how much he has unearthed about the Project, Colin steals one of Tory's journals while dining at the Blake household. Puzzled as to why he is drawn to Tory, Colin attempts to determine whether or not Tory has "attunement" after collapsing in a café, then proceeds to voice his own suspicions regarding the other's intentions in returning his journal. Volume 2 ends with Colin hitting Tory after Tory insists on working with him on the project.

Colin's slap turns out to be a "time out" moment for the two and both boys go up to Colin's apartment. Colin is amazed at how his cats react so positively to Tory and the two boys start talking. At one point, Tory begins to see Colin in a new light and misspeaks, practically spilling the beans about feelings that, up until then, were not clear to him. Tory leaves frustrated and Colin has an idea about Tory's true intentions at this point. A steamy dream seals the deal for Tory and his feelings towards Colin are in focus... just in time for Colin to up and disappear with his guardian. A few weeks pass and Tory, now more curious, decides to see the newly available apartment with a real estate agent. He finds a plant left behind and starts to care for it. He also starts feeding Colin's cats who were left behind as well.

Two days before Christmas, late in the afternoon, Colin comes back for his plant and is surprised to find it at Tory's. The boys, still unsure how to deal with all the discovery decide to try something... a kiss... Tory is most interested in contact information from Colin but Colin is not forthcoming, with the exception of a package of plant food labeled "Grow-Pak" and a hint about a new backer for the project. Colin leaves, telling Tory not to be bored, a subtle suggestion that Colin wants Tory to figure out where he's going. As Colin drives away, Tory is broken hearted, but starts to put the clues together in his journal to try to find out about "Grow-Pak" and where Colin went.

In the epilogue, we see Tory a few years older starting a job at "Grow-Pak". The reader is then treated to what seems like the first meeting between Colin and Tory since the day they kissed. The book leaves us with an ambiguous "The End... ?" to let the reader decide how their relationship continues.

== Cast ==
Christopher "Tory" Blake

Born August 26, 1990, and named after his hated father who left the family, Tory is an asocial self-proclaimed genius with a photographic memory, adept at playing arcade games. So unchallenged by academics that he resorts to other means of exhausting his energy, he is overly obsessive when something or someone catches his interest, and keeps tabs on every event he deems significant in his life, recording the exact time (down to the minute or second) and place in which they occur. When Colin moves into the apartment across the street, he instantly becomes hooked on tracking his every move. He chases after Colin, blinding himself with the prospect of uncovering his secrets; he is unwilling to admit to himself the circumstances surrounding his feelings towards the other boy.

Colin Stephens

Born November 18, 1989 in South Africa to a British father and British Chinese mother, Colin is an extremely quiet, mysterious, and cold boy who moves into the apartment (346 68th St., Woodridge, Queens, New York) across the street from Tory, Saturday September 25, 2004, between 12:14 AM and 1:25 AM. His success in school is mediocre despite study, and he often skips classes, adding to his already poor reputation among teachers and students alike. He lives a secluded life, only leaving his home to go to church and to travel. He suffers from an ailment that causes intense coughing and shivering that may or may not be related to his involvement in the Gaia Project. Though he rejects Tory and Mandy's attempts to help him during a relapse of his condition, he eventually becomes close friends with the two during their peer tutoring sessions. He owns approximately seven cats.

Amanda "Mandy" Townslan

An outgoing, popular, and gossipy girl at St. Peter's who is in the same science and P.E. classes as Tory and Colin. She has an affinity for withdrawn individuals, which leads her to befriend the two boys, always willing to lend a sympathetic ear. She has trouble in physics class, but does well in social studies and history. A vegetarian, Mandy supports animal rights and hopes to find a career in social services. She also enjoys meddling in Tory and Colin's relationship. Her two close friends, Amy and Mira, believe that she has strange tastes in regards to the boys she hangs out with.

Mary Grace Blake

Tory's overprotective single mother. She is the head of the graphic design department of a small advertising agency where she works, and is the owner of the apartment duplex where she and her son live together. She is mild-mannered and does not become infuriated by the fact that Paul steals food from their fridge, but worries around the clock about her son.

Paul Patterson

A blue-eyed college student who rents out the apartment above Tory's, Paul is the boy's only intellectual equal in some respects. He makes a living off graphic design, works towards a film major, and is obsessed with video games and internet porn. He is skilled with computers, able to hack files and write programs, often serving as Tory's means of collecting information on Colin. He pesters the boy for stalking Colin, but is repetitively met with defiance, which prompts him to take his leftovers.

Dr. Dustin Garrets

Born and raised in Massachusetts, 1958, Dr. Garrets is the American cofounder and present leader of the Gaia Project (launched 1985), and Colin's guardian. He studied archaeology, anthropology, and linguistics at Birkbeck, and is retired from science, but met with Colin's parents before their deaths and continued his research, taking custody of the boy after their respective passings. He cares only for his work, disregards Colin's personal interests, discourages him from making friends or spending money on frivolous things, and prevents his expulsion from school through large monetary donations. Shortly before moving across the street from Tory, Dr. Garrets was interrogated by police after an anonymous report claimed that he was in illegal possession of equipment, though charges were dismissed.

== Reception ==
Off Beat has been generally well received by readers. It has received praise for its unique style of art and humour, slow unraveling plot, and has been described as "a wildly imaginative romantic drama, filled with all the hopes, dreams and anxiety of a teenager trying to make sense of his place in the world." Readers find Off Beat's setting especially appealing, feeling that Quick has effectively crafted a "pure U.S. city" which has lent itself to a distinct American characterization despite influences from conventional modes of Japanese manga. Conversely, a minority of critics has dismissed these aspects as disorienting when compared to other manga, but nonetheless find redeeming qualities in the story and character development.

In 2005, Off Beat was awarded a silver medal for Best Graphic Novel from ForeWord Magazine.

== Books ==
- Off Beat Volume 1. ISBN 1-59816-132-6 (published September 13, 2005)
- Off Beat Volume 2. ISBN 1-59816-133-4 (published November 7, 2006)
- Off Beat Volume 3. ISBN 1-59816-134-2 (publishing date was to be December 2, 2008. In November 2011, Jen Quick stated in a post on Deviant Art that Off*beat Volume 3 would be available in some form in 2012. Off*beat Volume 3 was released one chapter per month in Sparkler Magazine starting in July 2013. Off*beat Volume 3 wrapped up with the end of Chapter 18 and an epilogue on April 18, 2014. Re-prints of Volumes 1&2 became available last July from Sparkler. The first printing of Volume 3 will be available in July 2014.)
- In Japan a digital version of the manga "オフ★ビート-BOY・ミーツ・BOY-" has been distributed by eBOOK Initiative Japan Co,. Ltd. on PC and cell phone. (published February 23, 2007)
