= Still Sick =

Japanese yuri manga

- English cover for Volume 1

スティルシック (Sutirushikku)
- Genre: Romance; Yuri
- Manga
- Written by: Akashi
- Published by: Mag Garden
- English publisher: NA: Tokyopop
- Imprint: Blade Comics Pixiv
- Magazine: MAGxiv
- Original run: April 2, 2018 – April 6, 2020
- Volumes: 3

Still Sick (スティルシック, Sutirushikku) is a Japanese yuri manga written and illustrated by Akashi. It was serialized online through Mag Garden's MAGxiv label on pixiv Comic from April 2018 to April 2020. It was licensed for an English-language release by Tokyopop in 2019. The series follows Makoto Shimizu, an office worker who secretly works as a doujinshi artist, and Akane Maekawa, her co-worker and former professional manga artist.

== Plot ==
When Makoto Shimizu, an office worker who secretly works as a doujinshi artist in her free time, is spotted by her co-worker, Akane Maekawa, while attending a yuri manga exhibition the two end up striking an unusual friendship. Makoto is intrigued by Akane, who claims to have never even heard of the word "yuri" yet was at the exhibition. As two gradually grow closer, Makoto learns that Akane once worked as a professional manga artist in the past but failed to get a series off the ground. Thus Makoto promises to support Akane's dream of being manga artist once again.

== Publication ==
Written and illustrated by Akashi, Still Sick was serialized online through Mag Garden's MAGxiv label on pixiv Comic from April 2, 2018, to April 6, 2020. The series was collected in three tankōbon volumes from December 2018 to June 2020.

The series is licensed for an English release in North America by Tokyopop.

No.	Original release date	Original ISBN	English release date	English ISBN
1	December 10, 2018	978-4-80-000815-2	November 15, 2019	978-1-42-786208-2
2	August 9, 2019	978-4-80-000884-8	March 17, 2020	978-1-42-786235-8
3	June 10, 2020	978-4-80-000984-5	February 23, 2021	978-1-42-786750-6

== Reception ==
In 2019 the series was nominated for Pixiv and Nippon Shuppan Hanbai, Inc's Web Manga General Election.

Erica Friedman of Yuricon praised the series, remarking in her review of the final volume that "Akashi ties the series up pretty tightly and allows us to close the book knowing neither we nor Akane and Makoto were jerked around by lazy writing." While she felt art suffered in some places she noted that "I will always take a well-told tale with slightly sketchy art over detailed art, with an underdeveloped story." Masha Zhdanova for WomenWriteAboutComics also recommend Still Sick when looking at how it and Gorou Kanbe's Don't Call Me Daddy depicted homophobia and queer desire in contemporary Japanese society; surmising that "I genuinely recommend both of these comics if you're in the mood for a character-driven romantic read about queer relationships."
