= Yuri Espoir =

Japanese yuri manga

- First English volume cover

ゆりでなる♥えすぽわーる (Yuri de Naru ♥ Esupowaru)
- Genre: Romance, drama, yuri
- Manga
- Written by: Mai Naoi
- Published by: Tokuma Shoten
- English publisher: NA: Tokyopop
- Magazine: Comic Ryu Web
- Original run: March 20, 2019 – present
- Volumes: 5

Yuri Espoir (ゆりでなる♥えすぽわーる, Yuri de Naru ♥ Esupowaru) is a Japanese yuri manga written and illustrated by Mai Naoi. It began serialization online via Tokuma Shoten's Comic Ryu Web manga website in March 2019, and was licensed for an English-language release by Tokyopop in 2022.

== Plot ==
After finding out that she will have to be part of a marriage of convenience to a man upon her graduation from high school, Kokoro Komadori sees no hope in her future. To at least try enjoy her final year of high school Kokoro decides to indulge in her love of other women and begins to create a yuri sketchbook based on the women she observes around town.

== Publication ==
Written and illustrated by Mai Naoi, Yuri Espoir began serialization online via Tokuma Shoten's Comic Ryu Web manga website on March 20, 2019. The series has been collected in five tankōbon volumes as of November 2025.

The series is licensed for an English release in North America by Tokyopop under their Love x Love imprint.

No.	Original release date	Original ISBN	English release date	English ISBN
1	July 13, 2019	978-4-19-950681-9	July 26, 2022	978-1-42-786825-1
2	June 12, 2020	978-4-19-950709-0	October 11, 2022	978-1-42-786826-8
3	July 13, 2021	978-4-19-950744-1	January 31, 2023	978-1-42-787254-8
4	November 11, 2022	978-4-19-950796-0	June 27, 2023	978-1-42-787254-8
5	November 13, 2025	978-4-19-950932-2	October 6, 2026	978-1-42-788871-6

== Reception ==
Yuri Espoir was nominated for the 2019 Next Manga Award in the web manga category.

The series has received positive reviews. Rebecca Silverman for Anime News Network gave the first volume of Yuri Espoir an overall B rating; remarking that "Yuri Espoir is an odd combination of froth and sadness. The way that the world seems hellbent on crushing Kokoro under the burden of false heteronormativity is undeniably tragic, but there is still hope in the form of Amami and her fantasies."

Erica Friedman of Yuricon praised the first volume's structure, remarking that "the main narrative may or may not be good in the end, but the individual chapters are a fab collection of Yuri tropes remixed in and out of "reality." I cannot stress this enough – I have not seen a story like this before. It was really very interesting." She went on to note that Mai Naoi's art was "not practiced and slick, but solid enough that both Kokoro and Amami has vastly different styles that are themselves recognizably different from the main narrative."
