= Juror 13 =

American comic

- Genre: Mystery
- Author: D. J. Milky
- Publisher: Tokyopop
- Original run: 2006
- Volumes: 1

Juror 13 is a one-shot American manga-inspired comic written and illustrated by D. J. Milky and published by Tokyopop. Tokyopop released the manga on January 1, 2006.

== Reception ==
About.com's Katherine Luther described Juror 13 as "a fun and adventurous manga mystery with surprises at every turn." IGN's Hilary Goldstein criticises the manga for having a storyline that is "painfully ordinary until the last handful of pages". Publishers Weekly described it as "taut, terse and unrelenting", calling it a "breath of fresh air" in the manga market.
