= Sokora Refugees =

Webcomic

- Author(s): Segamu, Melissa Dejesus
- Website: http://www.sokora.com/
- Current status/schedule: On hiatus
- Launch date: 31 December 2004
- End date: 10 November 2006
- Publisher(s): Madman Entertainment (Australia and New Zealand); Tokyopop (North America)
- Genre: Comedy/adventure
- Rating: Teen

Sokora Refugees was an original English-language manga webcomic by Segamu and Melissa DeJesus started on 31 December 2004 as an ongoing webcomic, updated every Monday, Wednesday and Friday. It has not appeared since 10 November 2006. All comic strips on its website were available free along with some fanservice contents to amuse and excite readers.

This webcomic is also published as a trade paperback by Tokyopop. According to Nielsen BookScan, Sokora Refugees is one of the publisher's best-selling amerimanga. The relevancy of this sales success was called into question in March 2005 in the comics newsblog The Beat, due to a perceived conflict-of-interest involving the author. In its 21 March 2005 issue, Publishers Weekly identified the writer of Sokora Refugees as Kurt Hassler, who was the Borders buyer for graphic novels; "Segamu" is presumably Hassler's pseudonym. Hassler left this position in November 2006.

The website for this webcomic was offline from 13 January 2007 to 29 March 2007, then back online with no new content. It went back offline on 18 April 2007 and, since 2 March 2009 the domain name redirects to a cybersquatter.

== Plot ==
Kana's life is normal if not bad due to her bad habits. Her life only changes for the worse when elf boy Tien comes along and he thinks Kana is an elf too. Tien gets Kana into a trap in the girls' bathroom, which is a portal to his home world Sokora. It is under siege by a demonic army. Then she gets herself into more mishaps, when her body is time-shared by a powerful elf sorceress. Along the way, Kana meet Tien's brother and the Nymph girl, Salome. She now has the job of saving Sokora. She did not really want to, but Kana may be the only hope for Sokora, if only she can stop being so lazy.

== Characters ==
- Kana : She is the main character of the story. Known for over-sleeping, lack of homework completion, and junk food eating habits, she will do anything to get her old life back. She "time-shares" her body with Veila. Blushing turns her into the much more attractive elf.
- Tamara : One of Kana's roommates, this athletic girl will take any challenge that crosses her path.
- Veila : A powerful elf sorceress forced to enter and time-share Kana's body. Veila is also extremely attractive and wears scanty clothing. Veila's goal is to save Sokora from evil forces. She is very mature and sensible, the direct opposite to Kana, and is often of no help in difficult situations.
- Tien : An arrogant, talented elf refugee from Sokora. Tien thinks Kana is an elf too. Tristan envies his magical talents. He is very self-centered and has made it very clear he dislikes the human girls and Salome. He is constantly put down by others, who are very aware of his magical talents.
- Griever : This goyle serves the demonic army that invaded Sokora. He wears bandages around his hands. If his hands touch the bare skin of any mortal, the mortal turns to stone.
- Julie: Another one of Kana's roommates, she is patient, intelligent and prone to have an unusually positive attitude, even in bad situations. Julie is almost a mother figure to her roommates.
- Salome: A raccoon nymph girl who only wanted to cozy up to Tien's older brother, Tristan. Unfortunately for her, he does not seem to return the love. She is very protective of Tristan, and will attack any girl who acts too friendly towards him, even if they are trying to help him. She usually ends her sentences with the sound "tk".
- Tristan: He is a rather weak elf compared to his enemies, though he can use a sword and a bow. He prefers to die than lose his "honor". He is the older, bossy brother of Tien. He saw Kana (in Veila's body) topless and has since done all he can to win the affection of his 'Lady Veila'. Kana has led him to believe that Viela is creating a master spell to save Sokora.
- Kogurai: A vampire who wants to return to his homeland. Has an interest in Kana.
- Horink, Xhel, Sklos: Three demons who want to get the Heart of Sokora, which is the source of all of Sokora's power. To get it, they have to open a door that holds it

== Books ==
On 2 November 2004, Tokyopop announced plans to publish Sokora Refugees before the comic was actually a webcomic. The first volume was published on 12 March 2005 and reached No. 7 in the BookScan list of graphic novels.

- Sokora Refugees, Volume 1 ISBN 1-59532-736-3
- Sokora Refugees, Volume 2 ISBN 1-59816-551-8
