= Snow (comics) =

English-language manga by Morgan Luthi

- Cover of Snow vol. 1 (2006), art by Morgan Luthi
- Genre: Action/adventure
- Author: Morgan Luthi
- Publisher: (United States) Tokyopop
- Original run: 2006
- Volumes: 1

Snow is an original English-language manga written and illustrated by Morgan Luthi and published by Tokyopop. It is Luthi's first comic, published after repeated rejections from the Rising Stars of Manga anthology.

It details the story of the titular hero, Snow, retreating to the cold, unknown planet of Hub to get away from his past. Meanwhile, the galaxy is being terrorized by giant genocidal aliens called Warmongers that seek to "purify" all worlds with their secret weapon, the Ghost of Destruction.

== Plot ==
There is news that the race of Warmongers have employed a doomsday device called "the Ghost of Destruction" that lays waste to whole planets. The story opens with a small sarcophagus landing in the middle of a city, and a mysterious man with empty eyes emerges and begins to destroy things with powerful telekinesis. The city tries to stop the Ghost, but it proves indestructible, and within minutes, the entire planet is reduced to ash. The Warmongers congratulate the Ghost's efforts, and encourage him to continue.

A young man with a severely scarred eye is walking across a snowy landscape covered in garbage, when he encounters the gates to Refuse City, a backwater city populated by many strange people and creatures. Once there, he witnesses a semi crash, and stops the driver from escaping. A girl orders her gang to rob the truck. She finds the young man, and asks his name. It starts snowing, so he absent-mindedly replies "Snow". The girl introduces herself as "Kat", and takes Snow in.

Kat explains that Refuse City is tangled up in gang warfare, and all the gangs answer to the Space Syndicate of Crooks, Assassins and Bandits (or "SSCAB") except for her gang, "The Crows", which makes headquarters in a diner. They support more charity and good deeds to prevent the greed and authority of SSCAB, and seek to preserve the way of life on the planet, called Hub. She further explains that Hub is one of the few places left in the galaxy that's quiet, tolerant, and not under the gaze of the Warmongers; a good place to get a second chance. Snow decides to join the Crows.

Meanwhile, the Warmongers are discussing a problem they're having with the Ghost, and send two Warmongers to attack planet Hub.

Later, a SSCAB member offers Kat an ultimatum as retribution for their truck robbery. Kat refuses, and the SSCAB threatens to blow up the diner with a small robot bomb that accompanied him, but leaves to give Kat time to think about it. Immediately after this, a large robot shoots up the diner. No one is hurt, but Kat remembers that the rest of the Crows are on patrol, and she and Snow rush out to find them.

They find the Crows engaged in a shootout with another gang, and Kat finds out that several Crows have been taken hostage. Kat asks Snow to come with her to rescue the hostages, but he's traumatized by all the violence, and tells Kat where he came from.

Snow came to Hub to hide from his past: he was the Ghost of Destruction. Following his latest devastation, the Ghost found two small children buried under some rubble, one of them wounded and dying. One of the children attacked the Ghost with a knife, causing the scar on Snow's eye. The Ghost was so shocked by seeing the pain he caused that he ran away to Hub, to make sure the Warmongers could never find him and use him again. He's not sure that will work, though; he still has the Ghost's terrible powers, and thinks he shouldn't exist anywhere. Kat convinces him that Snow is not the terrible weapon that the Ghost was, and that Hub will give him a second chance.

Kat and Snow find out that the hostages have been taken away on a train, so they commandeer a train engine called the "White Knight" to catch them. While they're catching up to the train, Kat confesses that she used to be a mercenary assassin for many years, killing for money. She, too, came to Hub to redeem herself. She asks Snow why he won't use his Ghost powers to stop the train, but he's afraid to try, since he doesn't know what he might do.

Kat and Snow raid the train, but Snow is captured and held at gunpoint by the gang's leader and an unstable goblin. Kat subdues the leader, and the goblin shoots Snow with what just turns out to be a water gun. They find the hostages in the next car, as well as one of the bomb robots from earlier, counting down. Snow uses it to scare off the gang, and Kat gets the other Crows and some SSCABs that don't want to die onto the White Knight. Snow, however, doesn't make it across, and the train explodes.

Snow survives the explosion by changing back into the Ghost of Destruction. Just then, the two Warmongers arrive on Hub, glad to have found their lost Ghost. The Warmongers think that Snow has malfunctioned, and ask him to be recalled. Snow refuses, and fights the Warmongers into submission. This exhausts Snow's Ghost powers, and he thinks they'll never return. Kat asks him to keep that to himself, as a form of insurance.

Following this incident, Snow becomes wanted, with a bounty of "NAME YOUR PRICE" offered for his capture.

== Characters ==
Snow.

Snow - The titular protagonist. He has a certain nervousness about the world around him and is rather soft-spoken, but he has a fierce sense of justice and a strong value of life. He used to be the Ghost of Destruction, a powerful doomsday device designed by the Warmongers to destroy entire planets.

Kat - Short for "Katarina", she took Snow in when he first arrived at Hub. She's the leader of a gang called "The Crows", and strives to keep Refuse City away from oppressive influences. She's a very tough and strong woman, prepared to deal with any problems she faces, but also compassionate and charitable.

The Warmongers - A race of 1,000-foot-tall (300 m) aliens that seek to "cleanse" worlds. They treat this task without emotion, and are consistently serious and businesslike. They resemble statues as well, with black, stony flesh and static faces. All this and the way they talk suggests that they are somewhat robotic.

Grom and Krom - The two Warmongers that invade Hub to find Snow. They are the only ones that are named or see any battle.

The Crows - Kat's gang. Their goal is to give back to Refuse City however they can, and get Hub out from under the oppressive control of the SSCAB gang syndicate.

SSCAB - The Space Syndicate of Crooks, Assassins and Bandits. They hold control over all the gangs in Refuse City, with the exception of the Crows. They are very violent, and their greed is insatiable.

== Volume 2 ==
The cliffhanger ending of Volume 1 hints at a second volume of Snow and even mentions "Snow: Volume 2", but there has been no news of it. Morgan Luthi, however, has released a preview image from Snow: Volume 2 on his DeviantArt gallery.
