= Riding Shotgun =

Riding shotgun refers to the practice of sitting alongside the driver in a moving vehicle.

Riding Shotgun may also refer to:

== Film ==
- Riding Shotgun (film), a 1954 western film starring Randolph Scott

== Literature ==
- Riding Shotgun (comics), a comics series by Tracy Yardley and Nate Bowden
- Riding Shotgun, a novel by Rita Mae Brown
- Riding Shotgun, a 2007 chapbook by Charles de Lint
- Riding Shotgun: 35 Years on the Road with Rory Gallagher and Nine Below Zero, a 2005 autobiography by Gerry McAvoy
- Riding Shotgun: The Role of the COO, a 2006 book by Nathan Bennett and Stephen A. Miles

== Music ==
- Ridin' Shotgun, an album by Jesse Colter
- "Riding Shotgun", a song by Anthrax from Stomp 442
- "Riding Shotgun", a song by Dick Damron
- "Riding Shotgun", a song by Katrina and the Waves from Waves
- "Riding Shotgun", a song by Kygo from Kids in Love
- "Riding Shotgun", a song by Lowrider from Ode to Io
- "Riding Shotgun", a song by Ric Ocasek from Quick Change World
