= Star Trek: The Manga =

Original English-language manga series

- Cover, Star Trek: The Manga volume 1
- Genre
- Publisher: Tokyopop (North America
- Other publishers: Madman Entertainment (Australia and New Zealand) Athenaeum 2000/Mangattack (Hungary)
- Original run: 2006–2009
- Volumes: 3 (The Original Series); 1 (The Next Generation)

Star Trek: The Manga is an original English-language manga from Tokyopop based on Star Trek: The Original Series that began in September 2006. Writers in the three volumes included Diane Duane, David Gerrold, Mike W. Barr and former Star Trek: The Next Generation cast member Wil Wheaton. Tokyopop released an additional manga based on The Next Generation in April 2009.

== Production ==
The manga series was produced by Tokyopop to time with the 40th anniversary of Star Trek in 2006. The writers of the first volume included Mike W. Barr, who had previously written for the DC and Malibu Comics Star Trek series as well as Dr Christopher Dows, Jim Alexander, Joshua Ortega and Rob Tokar. Ortega in particular had sought to evoke the feelings of The Original Series, saying "That era also has a freshness to it that just can't be beat, and an excellent sense of humor that was present in almost every episode." The stories in the second volume included those by Mike Wellman, Paul Benjamin and Christine Boylan. In addition, it featured a story by Diane Duane, who had written several Star Trek novels starting with The Wounded Sky in 1984 and co-wrote the Star Trek: The Next Generation season one episode "Where No One Has Gone Before".

The writer for the third volume was The Next Generation cast member Wil Wheaton, who had played Wesley Crusher on the show. Wheaton had been invited to write for the anthology by editor Luis Reyes, after Reyes had heard that Wheaton was interested in manga. Wheaton initially thought that he had a safety net with the project, but described the net as a "actually built out of barbed wire. And there are alligators crawling around on it, and monkeys with BB blowguns are constantly shooting at me while I walk across the high wire from 'I have an idea' to 'Okay, it's done!'" It was Wheaton's first professional attempt at writing fiction, which was something he had aspired to do, and in order to write the story he placed his reviews of The Next Generation for TV Squad on hold.

Another third volume writer was David Gerrold, who had previously written The Original Series episode "The Trouble with Tribbles" as well as two episodes for Star Trek: The Animated Series. His story in the third volume was based on one of the original pitches he made alongside the first Tribbles story. An omnibus of the three volumes was released. TokyoPop subsequently published a Star Trek: The Next Generation manga in April 2009, which featured writers who had worked on The Original Series volumes including Duane and Gerrold.

== Volumes ==
Shinsei/Shinsei (新生新星; lit. 'New Lives/New Stars')
Released September 5, 2006
Kakan ni Shinkou (果敢に進行; lit. 'To Boldly Go')
Released September 11, 2007
Uchu (宇宙; lit. 'Space')
Released July 15, 2008

Star Trek: The Next Generation: The Manga – Boukenshin
Released April 2009

== Reception ==
Writing for IGN, A.E. Sparrow said that Star Trek: The Manga made him reminisce about Sunday morning re-runs of the original series. Of the art, he thought that on occasion it was difficult to tell Dr. McCoy apart from other characters and also each story had a different style of drawing Captain Kirk and he was pleased to see the return of Nurse Chapel in the story "Til Death". John Tenuto, in his review of the third volume for TrekMovie.com, praised the writing of Wheaton but while he was pleased with the dialogue in Gerrold's story, he felt that it now seemed like a "derivative of Tribbles".
