= List of Trigun media =

List of media relating to anime and manga series Trigun

The following is a list of media relating to the anime and manga series Trigun by Yasuhiro Nightow.

== Music ==
Trigun features music by Tsuneo Imahori.

=== Soundtracks ===
==== Trigun: The First Donuts ====
Trigun: The First Donuts

Soundtrack album by Tsuneo Imahori
- Released: 1998 June 24 (Japan), 2006 February 7 (U.S.)
- Genre: Soundtrack
- Length: 1:14:40
- Label: Geneon (Pioneer)

Official disc data here and here. All tracks performed by Dr. Donuts except track 10 by AJA and track 11 by AKIMA & NEOS.

No.	Title	Length
1.	"NO-BEAT"	3:09
2.	"BIG BLUFF"	3:44
3.	"BLOOD AND THUNDER"	3:38
4.	"KNIVES"	3:18
5.	"Permanent Vacation"	5:14
6.	"Blue Funk"	3:28
7.	"PHILOSOPHY in a Tea Cup"	4:34
8.	"NOT AN ANGEL"	2:59
9.	"Cynical Pink"	3:47
10.	"Sound Life ~ REM"	5:24
11.	"風は未来に吹く" (The Wind Blows in the Future)	3:44
12.	"H.T."	1:32
13.	"WINNERS"	3:33
14.	"Never Could Have Been Worse"	5:00
15.	"Stories to Tell"	2:36
16.	"People Everyday"	2:57
17.	"Fool's Paradise"	4:10
18.	"YELLOW ALERT"	3:07
19.	"Carrot & Stick"	4:00
20.	"Perfect Night"	4:37
Total length:		01:14:40

==== Trigun: The 2nd Donut Happy Pack ====
Trigun: The 2nd Donut Happy Pack

Soundtrack album by Tsuneo Imahori
- Released: 1998 October 21 (Japan)
- Genres: Soundtrack, Rock music
- Length: ~67 min
- Label: Victor (JVC)

Official disc data. Tracks 2, 3, 5, 7, 9, 10, 12, 13, 15, 17, 19, 20, 22 and 23 performed by The Dr. Donut. Tracks 1, 4, 6, 8, 11, 14, 16, 18 and 21 are short audio dramas (in Japanese), rather than music. Helpful translation of audio drama

1. ラヴ&ピース (Love and Peace)
2. Nerve Rack
3. 楽園 (Paradise)
4. ウエスト·スラング (West Slang)
5. Unhappy Song
6. 黒猫空間 (Kuroneko[Black Cat] Space)
7. Colorless Sky
8. トライガン·マキシマム (Trigun Maximum)
9. Hash Hash
10. Lost Planet
11. Blue Spring
12. H.T. (Destroyingangel mix)
13. Zero Hour
14. Insurance #1
15. The Lowdown
16. Insurance #2
17. Gunpowder Tea
18. Insurance #3
19. Cheers!
20. Scattered Rain
21. ピアス (Piercing)
22. Blue Summers
23. 砂の星 (Star of Sand)

==== Trigun Spicy Stewed Donut ====
Trigun Spicy Stewed Donut

Soundtrack album by Tsuneo Imahori
- Released: 2001 July 31 (U.S.)
- Genres: Soundtrack, Rock
- Length: ~50 min
- Label: TOKYOPOP

Professional ratings
Review scores
Source	Rating
Animefringe	(not rated)
AnimeOnDVD	(not rated)

A compilation of the two soundtracks released in Japan, published in the U.S. only, from Tokyopop. Includes a booklet with images and information on the series, and a sticker with original Nightow artwork.

1. H.T.
2. NO-BEAT
3. Big Bluff
4. Unhappy Song
5. PHILOSOPHY In A Tea Cup
6. Cynical Pink
7. Nerve Rack
8. Zero Hour
9. KNIVES
10. Permanent Vacation
11. BLUE FUNK
12. YELLOW ALERT
13. Carot & Stick
14. Suna-no-hoshi
15. Kaze-wa Mirai-ni Fuku (風は未来に吹く / Wind Blows In the Future)

=== Theme songs ===
Opening
"H.T." written and arranged by Tsuneo Imahori.
Ending
"Wind Blows to the Future" (風は未来に吹く Kaze wa Mirai ni Fuku) written, composed, arranged, and sung by Akima & Neos.
Character development
"Sound Life" by Tsuneo Imahori – associated with the character of Rem, and by extension Vash's early life. It is a story of the development of a world, starting on the first evening and ending on the eighth morning (something like the Bible story of creation). The final verse of the song (in Japanese) is: Saa...atarashii sora ni subete wo shirushita kumikyoku ga hibiku, which translates to "Well then...A song that has recorded everything echoes to the new sky." The song has been on the planet for as long as humans have.

== Games ==
A video game, Trigun: The Planet Gunsmoke, was announced in 2002 by Sega and to be developed by Red Entertainment. While never officially canceled, there have been no mentions of the game since its original announcement.

Canadian company Guardians of Order released a hardbound role-playing game (RPG) book in December 2003 based on the Trigun TV series. This was not a self-contained RPG rulebook, but worked with the company's BESM anime RPG rule set. The book contains summaries of all 26 episodes of the TV series, along with character profiles, animation model sheets, production sketches, and color images from the series.
