= Yonen Buzz =

Original German-language manga

- Cover of Yonen Buzz vol. 1 (2005), art by Christina Plaka
- Genre: Drama
- Author: Christina Plaka
- Publisher: Tokyopop Germany
- Demographic: Teens
- Original run: 2005–2008
- Volumes: 4

Yonen Buzz is an original German-language manga by Christina Plaka and the continuation of Plastic Chew (originally entitled Prussian Blue, but changed in order to avoid association with the white nationalist band Prussian Blue). While Prussian Blue was published in German by Carlsen Verlag, Yonen Buzz was released by TOKYOPOP Germany. TOKYOPOP is releasing both titles in English in 2006. The release schedule is rather slow, as the author is a full-time Japanology student.

== Story ==
The series focuses on a Japanese garage band called Plastic Chew and their struggles to make it big while remaining true to their musical sensibilities and juggling school and part-time jobs. Internal conflict arises because not all four band members have the same talent levels and plans for the future; Saiyuri and Jun are romantically involved, but Jun is prone to psychological reliance on the man who raised him, someone the other band members don't trust.

=== Main characters ===
The members of Plastic Chew are the orphaned Jun Imai, who sings and plays the guitar along with the only female band member, Sayuri Tsushima; the bass guitarist Atsushi Kato; and Keigo Miyake, the drummer.

== Release ==
The series is also published in Finland by Pauna Media Group.

=== Volume list ===
No.	Original release date	Original ISBN	English release date	English ISBN
01	April 2005	978-3-86580-121-0	January 10, 2006	978-1-59816-403-9
02	March 2006	978-3-86580-122-7	May 9, 2006	978-1-59816-404-6
03	July 2007	978-3-86580-123-4	October 9, 2007	978-1-59816-405-3
04	April 2008	978-3-86580-124-1	—	—

== Reception ==
English-language critics were lukewarm towards Yonen Buzz. IGN's Richard George stated: "Yonen Buzz is what happens when you take interesting characters and do absolutely nothing with them." He described the "interesting and fleshed out" characters as the series' "greatest assets" and enjoyed the page layouts, but criticized the "repetitive character design" and that it "lacks a resolution to any plot". Rhia Docherty of Mangalife liked the concept of the series, but disliked the confusion in the panels and style changes, and that the concept failed to work and became confusing.

Critical reaction towards the prequel was relatively positive. Leroy Douresseaux of Coolstreak Cartoons wrote that the combination of "her composition and graphic design" inspired by shojo manga, manga targeted towards teen girls, and "the flavorings of shonen manga", manga targeted towards teen boys, "adds an essence to Yonen Buzz: Plastic Chew that makes for a fun read." While noting "plot contrivances" and that Jun is an "archetypal sensitive dreamboat", PopCultureShock's Phil Guie stated: "Yonen Buzz is, above all, about the idea that music, like a lot of artistic endeavors, is capable of bringing people together, and how joyous it can be meeting others with the same passion as your own." Writing for Mania Entertainment, Erin Jones commented on the "bland" character designs, "amateurish" art, and that some aspects of the plot were "ridiculously contrived". Jones concluded that while it might appeal to fans of the series, "Yonen Buzz: Plastic Chew is one of those titles that I’d just rather sweep under the carpet and forget about--particularly the first few chapters."
