= Les Bijoux (comics) =

South Korean manhwa

- Cover of the Tokyopop edition of Les Bijoux vol. 1 (2004), art by Park Sang-sun

레비쥬 RR: Re biju MR: Re piju
- Genre: Action-adventure, Fantasy, Tragedy, Drama
- Author: Jo Eun-ha
- Illustrator: Park Sang-sun
- Publisher: (South Korea) Daiwon C.I.
- English publisher: (United States) Tokyopop
- Other publishers: (Germany) Tokyopop (France) Saphira (Finland) Punainen jättiläinen (Poland) Kasen Comics
- Magazine: (South Korea) Issue
- Original run: 1999–2000
- Collected volumes: 5

Les Bijoux (Korean: 레비쥬) is a Korean manhwa, written by Jo Eun-ha and illustrated by Park Sang-sun. It was originally published in Korea by Daiwon C.I. and was then translated into an English edition and distributed in the United States by Tokyopop.

== Story ==
Les Bijoux takes place in a fantasy world where the ruling class, the Habits, brutally oppress the commoners, the Spars. A strange child is born to a dwarf and a hunchback. The child has the ability to transform from male to female—when female, she is called Lazuli; when male, he is called Lapis. When a cruel Habit lord named Diamond murders Lapis Lazuli's family, s/he vows revenge and decides to overthrow the tyrannical overlords.

== Characters ==
=== Main ===
Lapis Lazuli

The main character, a being who can switch gender, born to a Spar (slave) couple of a dwarf and a hunchback woman in Neige Mine. Given the complete name of "Lapis Lazuli," "Lapis" refers to the time when the protagonist is male and "Lazuli" when female. From the time s/he was born, Lapis has to deal with his/her unique physical traits, which includes dark, dusky skin. Though his/her family is poor, Lapis Lazuli nevertheless is blessed with two loving parents. Lapis first meets the Habit Diamond as a teenager, arousing the noble's ire when he kills one of Diamond's sled dogs in order to save a child. However, this is not their first meeting, as a much younger "Lazuli" had saved an equally younger Diamond years before. Over a misunderstanding, Lapis's parents are killed by Diamond. In revenge, Lapis hunts down Diamond and gouges out his eye, before fleeing Neige Mine. Eventually, Lapis learns of his destiny, which is to liberate the twelve mine states with the help of mystical guardians and human comrades. Lapis is a fundamentally just character, though he is reluctant at first to accept his responsibilities. Eventually, s/he comes to realize what must be done to truly free his people and at what cost. Even as hates Diamond for killing his parents and acknowledges that the Habit is one of the greatest dangers to his quest, Lapis comes to accept that his female half, Lazuli, loves Diamond, and by default, he loves Diamond as well.

=== Lapis's Guardians and Allies ===
Panther

Panther (Lazuli calls him Butterfly) is one of the twelve guardians, depicted as a lean, beautiful man with long black hair, a hieroglyph on his forehead, and an exotic wardrobe. Lapis first encounters Panther as a Panther while swimming in Soleil. He seems to have a somewhat familiar relationship with Carnelian but how far the familiarity goes is never explained. He later accompanies Lapis on his journey and acts as Lapis's primary companion and advisor. Panther takes his duties as a guardian very seriously, and soon comes to love Lapis deeply. Later it is revealed that he is one of the first humans, cursed with immortality for corruption. He has some degree of precognition, as he is able to predict (but unable to stop) Lazuli from being raped by Diamond, though this can be seen as another part of his curse. He is seriously wounded by one of Diamond's conjurations but he commits suicide on Tourmaline's blade to give Lapis his power, leading to an elaborate set of armor for Lapis and panther's head decorations on Tourmaline's.

Onyx

Another one of the twelve guardians, Onyx is an attractive and powerful young woman with dusky skin and light hair and also with a hieroglyph on her forehead. She is often dressed in rather skimpy clothing, suggestive of her home in the desert. The guardian of an ancient shrine, she has gone somewhat insane from centuries of isolation and thus, attempts to kill Lapis when he enters the shrine. Fortunately, Lapis's special abilities stop her just in time and stuns her. He tells her that he doesn't wish to harm her, though this has little effect on her temper. Later, however, she rescues him when he is lost in the desert in her animal form: a horse. In time, she comes to be a loyal ally and respects him highly. Like Panther, she is one of the first, cursed humans. It is revealed that she is in love with Panther, though he does not reciprocate her feelings, except in the form of a last, chaste kiss before he dies. She and her sister Equus are the only two of the original, cursed humans to survive.

Korbo

One of the twelve guardians as well, a young man with short black hair and a brand on his forehead and the ability to turn into a crow. His eyes are always closed while he smiles. He tells Lapis who murdered his parents, sending him on his murderous quest to find Diamond, after offering him a gem to swallow, which becomes Lapis's first guardian, Peridot. He later aids Chalcedony with the gift of a magical crystal ball. Later, he helps Lapis and his companions escape Sable mine and comes to act as a guide and dispenser of odd advice. Despite his perpetual smile, he is a trickster and something of a wild card, more well-known than the other guardians through the alias of "Black Wizard." When he does open his eyes, his expression instantly becomes serious. Once one of the first humans, along with Panther and Onyx, he was cursed for his corruption. He only smiles with his eyes closed because "he doesn't want the ugliness of the world to spoil his happiness." He allows himself to be killed by Lapis to release his power, which manifests as a pair of enormous feathered wings on Lapis's back.

Silica

A blind healer Lapis meets in Sable mine after being rescued in the desert. She is something of a leader for the Spars in the capital city, being practical and compassionate as well as possessing powers of healing and divination. When the habit Pyrope raises water taxes and conscripts all the young men in the city, she goes as the representative of the people to beg for mercy from the taxation and the conscription. Pyrope, noticing her beauty, makes a deal with her: no more water taxes and conscription of only half the young men in return for her permanent servitude in his palace. During that time, she comes to fall in love with Pyrope, even though he infuriates her with his lewdness and violence. It comes to the point where she saves him after he takes a poisoned arrow for her, and he comes to realize that he cares deeply for her. The two finally consummate their love, though it is revealed that Silica, with her ability of foresight, knew that she was destined to love him, though she tried her very best not to fall in love with him. When Diamond infiltrates the city, she and Pyrope escape the palace, only to face a contingent of Diamond's guard, who take Silica hostage. Unable to risk her, Pyrope becomes seriously injured before killing all the guards. Seeing Pyrope slowly dying, Silica tries to heal him, only to realize that she lost her healing ability because she is pregnant with Pyrope's child. In the meantime, Lapis comes to rescue her, even as Diamond comes charging in. Pyrope stays behind to guard their escape and is killed by Diamond. At his death, Silica faints, lost in grief. It is not explicitly told what happens to her during the years Lapis travels through the mines but it is implied she is in contact with the growing group, though settled down somewhere for the sake of her and Pyrope's son. She does come back to help harden Lapis's resolve with a chilling prophecy given in a trance state. After the wars in the Twelve Mines, she remains as a healer, delivering Carnelian's and Lothesite's child. It is only at that child's christening she finally names her son, naming him Lapis. "Silica" is a possible reference to silicon.

Shary

One of Lapis's twelve guardians, a little girl with long curly hair. She originally was from Volcano Mine but came to Sable after her parents were killed by Habits. It is implied she has the gift of foresight as well and the ability to heal, which comes in handy after Lapis saves her from a Neige soldier during the invasion of Sable. She is later lured to Emerald's castle and becomes an object of fascination for Shell, who saves her from Emerald and hides her away. Shary is a possible corruption of "sari."

Tourmaline

A legendary, somewhat sentient blade allegedly created by the Creator of the world as he cried upon seeing humans corrupted. Lapis has to choose the right blade in a treasure trove of weaponry at a desert shrine guarded by onyx and found it after some effort .

=== Habits ===
Diamond

The first and main villain of the story. He loves Lazuli without being aware that she is also Lapis. The ruler of Neige mine, Diamond commands instant obedience from his subjects and his Jujus (Concubines). As for his personality, Diamond is exactly like his name. He's cold, hard, and unyielding in all directions, with the power and ambition to wear down anything. Brilliant and ambitious, he seeks to do what no other Habit has done before: take over all twelve mines. Despite his cold demeanor and ambition, he harbors a pain-filled, torturous past. The illegitimate son of the King of Neige, he became heir to the throne when his father makes him crown prince in order to please Diamond's mother, a favored concubine. The Queen, along with her three legitimate children, cannot stand for this and poisons the King and buries Diamond's mother alive in a violent coup. Diamond escapes and with a young Lazuli's help, evades the Queen's assassins and takes refuge at a monastery. The abbot, noting Diamond's beauty, rapes the boy, saying it is the price for safety. From then on, a traumatized and furious Diamond dreams of becoming so strong, "nothing will get in my way again!" An undetermined number of years later, Ivory of Glace encounters a much older Diamond in a forest and falls instantly in love with him, giving him the means necessary to first kill the abbot and take back his rightful kingdom. Ironically, Diamond chooses to execute his stepmother and half-brothers the same way they killed his mother: burying them alive. Diamond is a brilliant and cruel man, and though he loves Lazuli beyond measure, he is obsessed with her and is prone to fits of jealousy and possessiveness. He kills Lapis's parents in a fit of rage over a misunderstanding about Lazuli, leading Lapis to get revenge by gouging out one of his eyes, an indignity Diamond promises to revisit, not realizing that Lapis and Lazuli are the same person. In his obsession, Diamond is prone to violent turns in mood, often reflective of his horrifying past. For example, in Emerald's castle, he ends up raping Lazuli and later, when she refuses to be touched by him, he breaks down in front of her, showing his true, childlike personality. Diamond dies as Emerald Castle is destroyed. After his death, Carnelian remarks that Diamond had his purpose in creating a new a better world: his campaign of conquering all the mines destroyed the Habit class and uprooted the cruel and unjust system to allow for a new society where all were equal.

Carnelian

A red haired Habit, joins up with Lapis around the same time Panther does; the two are implied to have a previous acquaintance and possible friendship. Exiled from Soleil by his brother Chalcedony, Carnelian returns in time to encounter Lapis. He's a very quick thinker and a well-rounded fighter despite his flippant attitude and effeminate beauty. It is revealed that he once loved one of his brother's concubines but his brother killed her and used her death as an excuse to banish Carnelian from Soleil, lest he take over the throne. He cares for Lapis deeply, though the latter doesn't reciprocate those feelings. Diamond "kills" him while invading Soleil but Carnelian later returns, albeit with scars from the experience.

Chalcedony

Carnelian's older brother and the ruler of Soleil mine. Much less attractive than Carnelian, he is sycophantic and power-hungry, looking for the legendary sword Tourmaline while flattering and pandering to Diamond. After killing Carnelian's lover, he had banished Carnelian from the mine, afraid that the younger man would try to take over. He spies on his kingdom with a magical crystal ball given to him by Crow, capturing the guardian of the sword, Panther, and later determining that Lapis is the key to the blade. He tries to force Lapis to give up the blade, by holding Sadd and his family hostage and later killing them, one by one when Lapis refuses and later does not produce Tourmaline. Chalcedony then has his hand cut off by an enraged Lapis before being murdered by Diamond, who violently overthrows Soleil.

Ivory

Ivory is a cruel, arrogant Habit who loves Diamond and believes herself engaged to him, ever since she helped him reclaim Neige in a violent coup. Diamond treats her with general indifference and even mild hatred, this was especially demonstrated when she threatens to find and kill Lazuli. In that instance, he slams her into a wall by her throat, threatening to kill her if she even thinks of such a thing. She is very possessive of Diamond and fondly calls him by endearments like "snowflake" and "doll," to Diamond's distaste. When she realizes that Diamond loves no one but Lazuli, she forces Emerald to help her torture Lazuli in a magical ritual in which Emerald betrays her and Ivory ends up getting taken to Hades.

Emerald

A beautiful, ancient Habit who is 300 years old and is also a powerful sorceress. She is very cold, with the exception of her favorite juju, Shell, and could be called a vampire because she drinks the blood of children she lures to her castle. It is implied that she has a powerful fear of aging due to some traumatic experience in her past. She has her own agenda and toys with Diamond's feelings for Lazuli and his ambition to rule the twelve Mines, as well as manipulating both Lapis and Ivory.

Pyrope

The ruler of the desert Mine of Sable, Pyrope is a young, attractive man with brilliant red hair and a notorious love of bloodshed, granting him the moniker of "Fire Demon." He is a womanizer and a Machiavellian tyrant, levying heavy fees on the scarce supplies of water in his desert kingdom and killing anyone who dares to disobey his orders. When the young, blind healer Silica begs him to reduce the water taxes and conscriptions, he takes her as his slave in return for reducing the taxes and taking only half the young men for his army. When Diamond attacks and lays the capital city under siege, he attacks back viciously, resulting in a war of attrition, during which he is poisoned by one of Diamond's assassins while protecting Silica. He comes to fall in love with her as he realizes she had healed him while he was poisoned. It is revealed that he is not cruel for the sake of being cruel, but rather, because his land is not a gentle one, strict control is required, especially as he ascended to his throne as a child in midst of tribal squabbling. His dream is to make his entire Mine a lush, green land and the water taxes were to pay for an aqueduct system. He is later killed by Diamond to allow Silica to escape with Lapis, wounding the other Habit in the process. Silica later gives birth to his son, who is named (five years after his birth) Lapis.

=== Minor characters ===
Cubic

Diamond's half brother who met Lapis Lazuli in Cite mine. He looks like Diamond with shorter hair and about 4-8 years younger. He is most likely not a prince since he appears to look like Diamond's mother and he may be her son by an unnamed husband or a lover. The only thing known for sure about his parents is that the dead Queen of Niege is not his mother as he didn't appear with her other sons in Volume 2 and he is much younger than they are.

Sadd

A friend that Lapis Lazuli stays with while in the Soleil mine. He's also the son of a well known cook and doesn't understand why Lapis hates his father's cooking. He doesn't know Lapis can be a girl. He is eventually killed by Chalcedony. His death releases Lapis's sealed power as well as giving him a reason to free all the Mines. He reappears as an illusion made by Emerald to disorient Lapis. Sadd is a type of gypsum.

Equus

A mannish woman clad in armor and with a strange brand upon her forehead, she is one of Diamond's magical servants. Her function is as Diamond's horse, as she is able to shift into one. She hates Lady Ivory to the point of having somewhat murderous intentions, though she is always stopped by Diamond. Her hatred may be partially based on the fact that she cares for Diamond deeply, though he would never reciprocate her affection. She also seems to dislike Lazuli as she lets her escape when she was in Sable with Diamond and she doesn't prevent her from running off again at Emerald Castle.

Lextus

A young man with a strange brand on his forehead perpetually dressed in a cloak of feathers, he acts as another of Diamond's magical servants. He has a variety of functions, from advisor to spy to military underling. During the siege on Sable Mine, he is able to identify the "devil's water" that bubbles nearby the city and Diamond has him organize troops. His animal form is an owl. He is a polite and wise young man in the few appearances he makes, even being polite to Lady Ivory.

Kenneth

Diamond's final magical servant, he is a young man with short hair and tapered ears, like the rest of the guardians. It is never shown what he acts as but he appears to have some role in Diamond's military command. His animal form is never shown in the series but is implied to be another bird of some sort. He has curious insight, particularly when he remarks about Lazuli seeming "more than a woman, somehow."

Shell

An effeminate boy who is the sole servant of Emerald, he is a combination of concubine and butler, also tending to the comatose forms of the children Emerald lures to her castle. He cares about his cruel mistress and is able to calm her during her periodic nightmares. For some reason, he is unable to kill Shary when ordered to drain her of her blood and instead pours his blood into Emerald's goblet before hiding Shary in one of the castle towers. Ivory, in order to punish Emerald, has Shell raped by several of her men after cutting off his long, curly hair. Though Shell ultimately helps Lazuli escape with Shary, he is unable to leave the castle because of his devotion to Emerald. He's killed by Diamond after Diamond sees him help Lazuli escape.
