= Unnie, I Like You! =

2024 yuri webtoon

- Cover for Volume 1
- Genre: Romance, drama, girls' love
- Author: Jeongussi
- Publisher: WEBTOON
- English publisher: WEBTOON; TOKYOPOP
- Original run: June 19, 2024
- Volumes: 1

Unnie, I Like You! is a girls' love manhwa created by Jeongussi. It follows Park Chanmi as she tries to reconnect with a university professor whom she fell in love with in past life. The series began publishing weekly on the Webtoon Originals platform in 2024.

== Plot ==
Park Chanmi, a college student from a wealthy family, vividly remembers her past life in which she harbored deep feelings toward a beautiful woman named Hanbyeol. However, Hanbyeol's life was cut tragically short and Chanmi remains haunted by the lose even in the present day. This all changes when Chanmi discovers that Hanbyeol is now a university professor, though unlike Chanmi she does not remember her past life. Undeterred, Chanmi begins to presume the professor in hopes that she can protect her from any tragedy she couldn't previously.

== Publication ==
Unnie, I Like You! is created by Jeongussi, who first self-published the series on the Webtoon Canvas platform from 2021 to 2023. On August 28, 2023, Jeongussi announced that the series would be moving to the Webtoon Originals platform, where it began being serialized weekly from June 19, 2024.

On November 5, 2025, Tokyopop's editor-in-chief Lena Atanassova announced during an interview with Comics Beat that Tokyopop would be publishing print volumes of the series under its LoveLove imprint.

No.	Release date	ISBN
1	October 6, 2026	9781427887979

== Reception ==
In 2021, Unnie, I Like You! was nominated from a WEBTOON CANVAS Award in the Star of 2021 category.

Anime News Network praised the series, giving it an overall 4 out of 5 and noting that "What makes Unnie, I Like You! endearing is its light, flowy art style that matches its similarly- minded plot."
