= ID eNTITY =

2000–2014 South Korean manhwa series

iD_ᴇNTITY
- Cover of the Tokyopop edition of iD_ᴇNTITY vol. 1 (2005), art by Son Hee-joon

유레카 RR: Yureka MR: Yurek'a
- Genre: Action/adventure, fantasy
- Author: Son Hee-joon
- Illustrator: Kim Youn-kyung
- Publisher: (South Korea) Haksan Culture Company
- English publisher: (Canada) (United States) Tokyopop (Australia) (New Zealand) Madman Entertainment
- Other publishers: (Spain) Dreamers Editorial
- Original run: 2000–2014
- Volumes: 41

iD_ᴇNTITY or Yureka (Korean: 유레카) is a Korean manhwa series created by Son Hee-joon in collaboration with Kim Youn-kyung and distributed by Tokyopop in North America. The series centers on the main character Jang-Gun and his friends along with their virtual reality avatars in the computer game world called "Lost Saga". There are 41 volumes right now, twelve of them have been released in the United States and 41 in France.

== Story ==
The series centers on the main character Jang-Gun and his friends along with their virtual reality avatars in the computer game world called "Lost Saga". When Jang-Gun logs on as a different character, he "Creates" an AI with a personality from the hacked disk he found when renewing his appearance for his once a year renewal process. Yureka is a flutter-brained, but advanced, AI with powerful stats and a real-life doppelganger. It is his turn to see just how deep his immersion in the virtual world goes.

The following is a plot summary by volume:

=== Volume One ===
Many of the central characters (and their relationships to each other) are introduced in this volume, including Team Triple Threat, Lotto's family, Myriah, Aradon, the Lovely Angels, Row-the-Mighty, Miss Piri, and Capri. Oddly enough, Yureka does not make her debut until the second volume.

=== Volume Two ===
Jang-gun's birthday passes unheeded by his family, but he does find that he needs to renew his Lost Saga ID. When he goes to the Net Room to do so, he accidentally bumps into a girl who drops a card with the name 'Yureka' on it on her way out of the Room. Later that day, he accidentally logs on with the card, creating the impossibly strong but airheaded AI, Yureka, who is at once aware of her AI status and strength, but blissfully unaware of guile and trickery. Under this disguise, he clears a high-level dungeon called Terror Tower with the other two members of Team Triple Threat. The next day he logs on under his own name, but is bewildered to encounter Yureka herself, who joins the Team after showcasing her strength the previous night.

=== Volume Three ===
Volume Three heralds the beginning of the first story arc, the Double Trouble Tournament. With riches and treasure as a promised prize, everyone in Lost Saga is dying to join. Lotto enters with Yureka at his side, and meets Rapha and John on his way to entry. A preliminary is held, in which the pairs must fight two tough monsters, the cyclops from Terror Tower and a generic Ghouliant undead sort of mage which, according to Boromir's exclamation in this volume, is called a Lich. After this grueling pretest, there are eight remaining teams: Lotto and Yureka, Ah-Dol and Boromid, Rapha and John, The Lovely Angels, Aradon and Alpha, a strange Necromancer(Baltisse)/Axman(Lazarus) team, a generic filler team, and Row-the-Mighty, with a mysterious master-level witch by his side. These teams are set up in a tournament bracket, and the first fight takes place between Lotto and Row.

Lotto and the witch, named Orugazi (other translations term her Horgacia, etc.) have a magical face-off of epic proportions, which ends in a double KO. Yureka is then forced to fight Row- she easily overpowers him, but her compassion stays her hand. Row, realizing this, concedes the match.

Immediately after this, Lotto runs out to brag to Miss Piri, the NPC storekeep he crushes on. Yureka follows him to fetch him back (Ah-dol and Boromir's match is going on) and inadvertently displays a new power: Yureka pulls Miss Piri free of the strict set of preprogrammed boundaries surrounding her store, that Miss Piri is bound to as an NPC, so that she can watch the tournament.

The volume concludes with Boromir and Ah-dol's complete and easy victory over the nameless team, and Miss Piri's thanks for her freedom.

=== Volume Four ===
All story is still about the tournament.

=== Volume Five ===
All story is still about the tournament. Boromir and Ah-Dol face off against Aradon and Alpha who uses multiple classes to create the "ninja class."

=== Volume Six ===
All story is still about the tournament. The last battle of the Double Trouble Tournament, Yureka and Lotto against Aradon and Alpha begin. While Lotto and Aradon are in the middle of their fight, a mysterious demon appears—Cube. Cube explains that the demon army will be coming to Normal City to take over their land and that they can try to get to Demon Island, however they will be waiting for them.

=== Volume Seven ===
Various characters begin preparing for the match-off with the demons. The people who will actually be going to Demon's Island turn out to be Yureka, Lotto, Boromir, Ah-Dol, Aradon, an anti-priest named Il-Barn, Capri, Basara, and a player who happens to know where the entrance to Demon's Island (that Basara found) is. Lotto also asks Row-the-Mighty a request — to defend the city. The group splits their separate ways because there are two portals. Il-Barn, Capri, Boromir, and Ah-Dol form one team, and Lotto, Yureka, Aradon, and Olios form the other. Basara eventually comes later behind the group of Roto, Yureka, Aradon, and Olios. Each team defeats many monsters called Cerberus. As the demon army attacks Normal City, the party all enter Demon Island.

=== Volume Eight ===
In Normal City, the combined powers of four guilds were unable to withstand the power of the demon army and retreat. Row-the-Mighty, keeping his promise with Lotto, begins fighting monsters one by one in order to defend the city. Eventually, various other characters (a random warrior who is first to join Row, Rapha, John, "Mistress Orugazi," K.C., Julie, and eventually Alpha) join him to defend Normal City, causing other players (who are offline and watching the whole thing) to join in.

=== Volume Nine ===
On Demon Island, the two groups have to defeat the demon king's Devas. The first two are played by real-life people who work for the company. One of them turns out to be Myriah (using the form of the demon Pristina), and she faces off with the party of Il-Barn, Capri, Boromir, and Ah-Dol. On the other hand, just as they (Lotto, Yureka, Aradon, and Olios) are about to lose, Basara appears and proceeds to kill the masked Deva. Lotto makes a deal with Basara which he (Basara) agrees to. The deal is that Basara can kill all the monsters and that they (Lotto, Yureka, Aradon, and Olios) will finish off his "leftovers" or complete the quest if Basara were to die. They continue on to meet the next Deva—Cube. Roto then leaves Basara to fight Cube and heads for the entrance to the demon king's room along with Yureka, Aradon, and Olios. Basara stops him from doing so, causing Lotto to fall. Yureka jumps down to save Lotto. As Basara is turned to stone by Cube, Aradon and Olios leave Lotto and Yureka to fight Cube.

=== Volume Ten ===
Just as they are about to be defeated by Pristina's dragon, Il-Barn uses his anti-priest master-level item to bring Capri to full power in exchange for Capri's life (online) and one of his levels. Capri survives a blast from the dragon and kills Pristina. Il-barn, Boromir, and Ah-Dol continue on to meet their next opponent—the Deva Neogia. Ah-Dol starts with the first attack and is soon defeated. However, his defeat was not in vain as Il-Barn and Boromir learns that Neogia can read their next movement. The two team up and manage to strike Neogia with Il-Barn's master-level item which causes Neogia to begin losing a life point each second. Neogia claims to be able to last an hour, meaning that he has 3,600 health points. Boromir and Il-Barn manage to capture Neogia, allowing Boromir and Ah-Dol to continue onto the demon king. Soon enough, Aradon and Olios reach the demon king, but are both defeated. Lotto tricks Cube, using the fact that Cube is confused about his past to his advantage and gets Cube to help them reach the demon king via a shortcut. Boromir and Ah-Dol arrive at the top of the stairs to the demon king's room's entrance just as Aradon is defeated. Eventually, Lotto, Yureka, and Cube reach the demon king's room. Aradon and Olios offer to help.

=== Volume Eleven ===
Boromir and Ah-Dol awaken and now Team Triple Threat is complete. Lotto then begins to question the reason why they are fighting. Aradon then explains that Dexon (the creators of Lost Saga) is combining with Mega Entertainment and that this battle will determine the future of Lost Saga. Everyone then becomes serious about this match and the battle begins. Lotto and Aradon prepare their ultimate techniques to bring down the demon king, but the demon king blocks them. Aradon attempts to kill the demon king using a new magic spell he hasn't used in the battle yet. A large explosion occurs soon after, yet the demon king survives (as well as everyone else). Roto explains that due to something underground, the demon king has infinite regeneration. Everyone except Aradon leaves. Aradon asks the demon king a question. Lotto, Yureka, Ah-Dol, and Olios then encounter Cube. Cube begins to attack with lightning, however Olios counters it with his metal-tipped arrows. As Lotto, Yureka, and Ah-Dol walk downstairs, they encounter Neogia.

=== Volume Twelve ===
As Ah-Dol prepares to fight Neogia, he's revealed about a player option that causes them to affect their levels and discovers that players like Roto and Aradon are using said option in order to pre-buff themselves before most important fights. Seeing this as cheating, Ah-Dol tells Roto to go on ahead while he fights Neogia (in the rudest of ways). Roto and Yureka soon find themselves in a fiery pit fighting an onslaught of weak monsters before stronger ones pop out in the "Heart" of Lost Saga.

While this is happening, Olios is fighting Kube and Aradon is fighting Kast.

== Characters ==
The characters are as follows: Left to right, top row: Olios, Alpha, Rapha holding a plush John doll. Second Row: Sisters K.C. and Julie in the yellow, Aradon to the twins' lower right, Boromiru with the spiky blond hair, Ah-Dol with blue hair and angry-looking, and pre-Monster Island Myriah looking off to the right. Below Ah-Dol, approaching the foreground: Roto directly below, Yureka on his lower left, Miss Piri to Yureka's lower left.

The names of the characters are listed first, with their Lost Saga identities in (parentheses) unless their real names are unknown, in which case they will be listed by their handles only.

=== Team Triple Threat ===
==== Jang-Gun (Lotto/Roto) ====
Hangul: 장군
Age: 16
Title: Archmage
Class: Mage
Sub-class: Swordsman
Occupation: High School Junior

Lotto/Roto (his identity in the game, and what he is most commonly called) is a master level sorcerer (later wizard/ Archmage). Along with Boromid and Ah-Dol, he is one of the members of Team Triple Threat. He is considered one of the most powerful players in the game, logging over 6000 hours, the most since last beta.

Jang-Gun is very short for his age, but is still considered attractive, and is popular with girls (although he hardly notices them, usually thinking about game strategy). He's a bit of a jerk. He is very manipulative, exploiting others to his own advantage, as well as clever, able to discover new uses for his powers, that surprises everyone. and hitting or burning Yureka when she irritates him. He is also very arrogant, with many character during the Demon war, not want him to face the demon king, as they would never hear the end of it. But he cares very much for his friends and Yureka, being extremely angry, if they had been defeated.

Although he is crazy for the game, he still manages to maintain an A-plus average in school and put up with his chain-smoker mother and chatroom-obsessed sister, Rose (Chang-Mi). When his Lost Saga ID card expires and he goes to renew it, he accidentally picks up a hacked one with the name Yureka on it- when he accidentally logs on with it, Yureka is created. As the series continues, his relationship with Yureka grows. At first, he used her as a punching bag, having her help in fights, while he questioned what she was. In the Demons War arc, he cared enough to have a ring given to her that made all damage she took be taken from his mana instead. After Yureka was deleted, he fell into great depression, quitting lost saga, and stopped talking to his friends. He later started again, to revive her, and anything someone tried to copy her, he would angrily ignore them. Once he found Yureka true person, Jaeha is an alternate personality, he accepts both of them. He later reveals that he cares for both personalities, and that he likes Yureka.

Lotto specializes in fire magic & fire-based summons (i.e. Efreeti), but he can use other elemental-based magic if need be. Along with the large repertoire of spells he has at his disposal he is a semi-skilled Swordsman, supposedly shoring up many of the sorcerer class' weaknesses in his quest to become a Grand Mage. He is said to have a large amount of mana, something his rival Aradon admits. One of his greatest strengths is his ability to mix his skills to create abilities that can give him the edge in battle, even against stronger foes. These include modifying the Berserk spell so the target focuses a little on its own defense rather than dedicating all power to attacking, and bouncing his magic off his own barrier to create magic capable of piercing an opponent's magic barrier. One of his major strengths is his intellect, allowing him to think of strategies and use new abilities that have gained him impressive victories.

In the two team tournament, he showed that he was roughly at Aradon's strength, before the tournament was interrupted. After the tournament, he is represented as a Wizard/ Archmage, joining in the battle against Lord Kast, the demon king. He, Yureka, Aradon, and Olios take one path, by which they meet up with Basara. After tricking him to let them follow him, they continued to the castle. After battling Kast, they realized that it was impossible to defeat him as he would infinitely heal. To solve this, Roto and Yureka went to the core of the castle and found Kast's power source, a creature represented as the opening of Pandora's box, a creature that does damage that can not be fully healed and if killed by the beast, one can not log back into Lost Saga. In the midst of battling this creature Lotto falls to dark magic, and becomes a demon in his desperation. This resulted in the real Yureka showing up, killing the Yureka AI, and an old man casting the seal of saint, sealing the creature and revealing that the massacre was a Beta test of Dexon. Disgusted by this action, and the fact that Yureka was gone, he decided to quit lost saga.

Later on Lotto is logging in as Yureka and meeting up with a Jijong Jang, an annoying character who uses people to get what he wants. As Yureka he meets with Elca, a player who can harm players real bodies when online, Lotto agreed to protect Jang and two other players, by using Yureka to train them in the Dragon Lands. Finally the real Yureka showed up killing players and resulting her state in a coma, and later on playing with Lotto and other others on Lost Saga while in the coma. In the process Lotto has realized Slayan has defeated Basara and is battling Slayan.

==== Yureka ====
Hangul: 유레카
Class: Freelancer, Swordsmaster

After Roto gets his normal ID back, Yureka is still around. Her presence hasn't been explained yet, but she is most likely a rogue AI, like Aura from the .hack series. She may have been hacked, as her stats are all maxed out- strangely enough, her skill for specific spells and weapons are all at zero. Regardless, she embodies a unique power to mimic moves enemies use on her and retaliate with versions of them more powerful than the original. Her real-life counterpart, Jaeha, reappears in volume 6, mildly surprised to see 'herself' on television. She is revealed to have feelings for Roto, always protecting him. When she was erased, he learned of her history. Yureka name in the real world is Jaeha. Jaeha was a skilled hacker that worked as a "killer", a person on the net that attacked corrupt politicians or businessman, putting them in a coma-like state. It turns out Jaeha's parents were tricked by such people, causing them to commit suicide and attempt to kill her as well. She wanted to become a "killer" to gain revenge on that man. After losing her card, she found that Yureka existed and watched her and Roto as entertainment. As time progressed, she focused more and more on Yureka's life, interfering with her job, making her partner Elca angry. They later realized that Roto was learning too much of Yureka's programming, so they decided to separate them, causing Jaeha to kill Yureka. But it was too late, as Jaeha was in love with Roto, and was jealous of Yureka's relationship with him. Later when Yureka was revived, Yureka and Jaeha share the same body, but their separate psyches create conflict, as they both love Roto and they want to be loved by him. So much that Yureka has been suppressing Jaeha's will.

==== Kwan-Su (Boromir) ====
Hangul: 관수
Class: Priest (Temple Knight)
Sub-Class: Warrior
Occupation: High School Junior

The master level priest (later temple knight) of Team Triple Threat, Boromir is frequently the comic relief, and most likely the weakest member of his team. Unlike Roto, he enjoys the attention of girls his age, and is constantly frustrated as they all flock around his apathetic friend- he fancies himself a ladies' man, but he's really just a big pervert. He upskirts various female NPCs as an in-game hobby, and his reputation in the game as a result is dismal. As Triple Threat's only healer, his role is very important- but then again, he's not the best healer around, since his first instinct in a fight is to run for the exit. But despite this he is very skilled, even giving Aradon a hard time. He is very cowardly, mostly having his friends fight on the front lines. He has openly said he uses them as meat shields. But he has great care for his friends, if one of them is killed off, he goes in a rage, and is willing to do a suicide attack to get revenge. He prefers to fight with maces, but has been seen dual-wielding ogre scimitars, or using the Priest-class master item, Mjollnir (a lightning-based hammer with awesome power). In Lost Saga, a Priest is similar to a White Mage.

Boromid also frequently breaks the fourth wall. He seems to be aware that he is a character in a manhwa, and often complains about poor exposure and lack of splash pages.

Outside the US, Boromid is named "Boromir".

==== Woon-Suk (Ah-Dol) ====
Hangul: 운석
Class: Master Level Warrior (Force Master)
Sub-Class: Sorcerer
Occupation: High School Junior

Ah-Dol is the warrior of Team Triple Threat. Unlike his two friends, Boromid and Roto, he is stoic, and doesn't excite as easily as the others- unless his brother's avatar, Alpha, happens to be around. He is very hotheaded He tends to be the only thing preventing Boromid and Roto from attempting to kill each other. Also unlike his allies, he shuns weapons such as swords and maces as he prefers instead to move in close and pummel his enemies with his knuckle dusters. His sub-class is sorcerer, as he would like to use elemental-based skills like Magma Punch.

=== Other Master-Level Players ===
==== Aradon the Black ====
Title: Magic Sword Master
Class: Sorcerer
First Sub-Class: Swordmaster (Master level)
Second Sub-class: Warrior (Master level)

Aradon is famous for being a bounty hunter, hunting down player killers for a reward, as well as being one of the fastest player ever to reach master level. He is the first player to ever obtain two master levels and later first to reach a third achieving rank as a master sorcerer, a master swordsman and master warrior status. He teams up with the mysterious Alpha for the Luciferian Double Trouble Team Tournament. He wields both the magical Sword of Harmony which he uses to channel and control the elements and the master-level Warrior/Sorcerer weapon Gladiat, the Sword of Light. He is commented on during the series to be very handsome, and has captured the heart of NPC Miss Piri, whom Roto loves. In one of the recent chapters of "Yureka," Aradon is seen wearing a high school uniform, with Olyus catching up to him. His real identity, however, remains vague.

==== Il-Ban ====
A master-level Anti-Priest (also known as Dark Priest), which is a combination of a master level Necromancer and a master level Priest. He is not featured largely in the series until Volume 6. Capri (the player who mentioned him earlier and a good friend of Il-Ban) also referred to how Il-Ban helped him out earlier on in the game, contradicting his title "Dark Priest of the Dragon Lands," and his physical appearance (he is menacing looking, with an inverted cross on his forehead). Il-Ban later explains what constitutes a Dark Priest, when he resurrects Rapha as a Night Shade (a spirit-type monster). Il-Ban is intimate with the workings and events of the game, and may have connections to the company. He also met with Alpha (during a flashback) and is the one who dubbed him a ranger. In the past, he was known as the "ruler" of the Dragonlands, and he was a very well known Player Killer. He hardly participated in the battle to defeat the Demon King, and it was implied that he was involved in a plot to destroy Lost Saga. Later it's revealed that in real life, he is actually a programmer that works for Dexon's competitor, Mega Entertainment (Dexon is the creator of Lost Saga). Il-Ban plays Lost Saga to study the fundamentals of the game for the purpose of his own work, not to have fun. As such, he has a very strong knowledge of the game mechanics. Il-Ban is involved in a plot to cripple Lost Saga before the impending merger between Dexon's and Mega Entertainment's respective games, thus giving Mega Entertainment a large advantage. As part of his plot, Il-Ban has created an AI character named Ban, that is based on a combination between the powers of Yureka and Ijoyen/Neogia.

==== Basara ====
One of the master level players, and is considered the best player in Lost Saga (the game): He soloed a difficult dungeon known as the Tower of Terror to properly gauge the power of his two swords to find the stronger, the latter being discarded on the spot despite being worth 700,000 gold. He extremely despises people who attack his "prey" and is even willing to break player-killing laws in order to dispense his own version of "justice". He is brash and hotheaded as seen when he attempts to kill Roto and company for taking his route for the quest. Later, thanks to Roto's backstabbing, Basara got turned into stone by Cube. Later on however, he is able to break free. He then goes on to defeat the Demon King who was thought to be invincible. He is later seen to be killed by Slayan at the end of chapter 147, after his defeat he is found by jijon jang and dragon lands Phuan. in a deep depression, although they don't know its him.

Extra note: according to the profiles in the manga, Basara "Enjoys long walks on the beach. Alone."

==== "Mistress Orugazi" ====
The first master-level witch Roto meets in the series so far, she has a flying broomstick which she uses to evade attacks while she casts her spells. She teams with Row in the Double Trouble Tournament, but is beaten by Roto in the first round. Later, she has a change of heart and joins Row in defending Nomal City from the monster horde. She possesses great magical power as seen when she can unleash Meteo, a powerful spell that summons meteors to crush foes.

=== Team Fallen Angels ===
A team of master-level thieves- make that treasure hunters- who are a pair of sibling pop stars ("The Lovely Angels") out of the game. They have the tricky task of juggling celebrity status with devotion to the game.

==== Jin-Mee (K.C.) ====
Hangul: 진미

A master-level Thief and one half of the Team. She and her sister Gina (or her game name, Julie) are also the famous pop group known as "The Lovely Angels". Her master-class item is a bandanna that allows her to become invisible. She is also skilled in Lair's wire, which is barely visible wire used by high-level thieves to hold down foes or protect areas. She is latter killed by a mysterious character who has also a master level thief because he also has the bandana.

==== Gina (Julie) ====
Hangul: 진아

Another master level thief and Jin-Mee/ K.C.'s sister. She is the other half of both "The Fallen Angels" and "The Lovely Angels". She uses her master-class item, a remote-controlled boomerang to kill her foes. She is also skilled in using poisons on her weapons.

=== Other characters ===
==== Da-Bin Yun (Rapha) ====
Hangul: 윤 다빈
Class: Cleric

Offline, Da-Bin is a 16-year-old student attending "Beautiful Star Middle School". She has a girlish crush on her NPC guardian, John, which enables them to do things in-game previously thought impossible. As a Cleric, Rapha is around 80th level prior to her fight with Roto, and substantially below that in the Monster Island Arc. The reason for this is that among the many powerful heals and buffs in Rapha's arsenal, she has a revival prayer- Sacrifice- which she uses to bring back John at the cost of her own stats. This sets off an easter egg which temporarily increased John's abilities significantly, even high enough to slay the Ancient Dragon Lord Matria, a boss thought by most users to be impossible to kill.

==== Mun-Suk Sim (Myriah) ====
Hangul: 심 문숙
Class: Beastmistress
Occupation: Student/Debugger/Admin/Deva

A 17-year-old student and part-time employee for Dexon Corp, she has a serious grudge against Team Triple Threat (who has dubbed her "Medusa), after they ruined her life during a power play session. She is technically a debugger, but when in the game, she has powers like that of a Beastmaster.

Myriah remembers just why she hates Team Triple Threat during an out-of-game chat with her friend, the niece of Dexon's CEO. When she was a regular player, she was an accomplished Beastmistress with a populated menagerie of mythical beasts, like griffins and manticores. Tragically, Team Triple Threat happened to be levelbusting nearby, and burned the barn down for the loot and experience points.

==== Jun-Suk Hwang (Row-the-Mighty) ====
Hangul:
황 준석 Class: Swordmaster

Row starts out as an arrogant weakling who only serves to annoy Team Triple Threat, but he gains strength and courage throughout the series and turns hero in Volume 8, where he tries to single-handedly protect Nomal City from a horde of monsters. He gives Yureka her first copycatted move, a shockwave-type attack he calls Sword Pulse Wave (like an Air Render). He was awarded Master-Class in volume 9 but was killed from behind by a lesser dragon while celebrating. Unbelievably, he then bravely logged back in to continue the defense of the city at the cost of his master level. His noble sacrifice inspires others including Woon-Ha(Alpha) to aid in his cause and defend Nomal City.

At master level, he chose the Orichalcon Sword instead of Gladiat, saying it was more his style. The sword lost its power and broke when he attempted to use it below master level after logging back in. He does appear to receive a new one, however, as he is seen with the Oricahlcon Sword when attempting to protect Miss Piri from a dangerous PK named Slayan.

During the event Last Memory, he is wounded by the same Slayan, which makes him blind, and due to the impossibility to disconnect in order to heal, he is forced to learn how to fight in this state. By the end of a short training with Whan, he took back most of his combat abilities and realize that this ways of playing offers him another dimension of the game.

==== Woon-Ha Sung (Alpha) ====
Hangul: 성 운하
Age: 22
Occupation: Net Room Proprietor
Class: Ranger or Ninja (Depends on who you ask)

Ah-Dol's older brother in the real world, he is a self-proclaimed 'ninja' in the world of Lost Saga. In reality (inside Lost Saga), he is what is termed a ranger, a player who has obtained a variety of obscure and eccelastic skills from other classes to enrich his playing experience. Even though he isn't master level, the combined level of all his skills is over 200, which rivals that of a double master. This was enough for Aradon to choose him as a partner in the Double Trouble Tournament. In the past, he was strong enough to fight the player-killer Anti-Priest Il-Ban to a draw. He also saved John's life in the Double Trouble Tournament after the match with the Fallen Angels, with an arcane "Poison Identification" skill. He has many "unique" skills and chose to protect Nomal City using the identity of Sauel Abi Beta(or Saurabi Beta), using a new look and choosing martial arts over ninja skills after Il-Ban's disclaimer. He keeps changing his character's appearance and goes on to use the names Gamma and Delta also. Alpha also plays under the ID Omega on Cyber Quest, a competitor game to Lost Saga, and is known as one of the best players of the game. Ah-Dol went berserk when Woon-Ha supposedly "died", at the hands of Yureka's creator Jaeha. He managed to infect Jaeha with an anti-kill virus which instead gave people game overs. It's also suggested he might be a Hacker, or a Bounty Hunter.

==== Olios ====
Class: Archer

Per the U.S. releases, very little is known about Olios other than that he discovered the Thirsty Hill entrance to Monster Island and has deadly aim with any sort of projectile weapon, be it greatbow or rifle. He gets along with Aradon moderately well. He is also a player of Force Recon, which is where he met Roto, and is apparently the only person ever to get a clean head shot on him.

It is often noted by his fellow characters that the "arrows" which he uses in conjunction with his massive greatbow are more accurately described as spears.

==== Slayan ====
Class: Thief
Sub-Class: Unknown

A unknown player who was first seen in chapter 144 encountering number 8, Seidus "class: Archer". This player is extremely strong, he is able to kill many players, as well as being able to follow them without them knowing. Slayan's main weapon is the strange gauntlets that he uses in all fights but later revealed in chapter 148 that he has the scarf of invisibility, portraying that he is a master class thief. In chapter 164 it is revealed that there are 3 Slayans, all master level Thieves using the invisibility scarf to attack opponents at the same time and make it appear that to their opponents that Slayan is so fast that he can attack from many different angles before they can even turn around. The Slayan trio was revealed to be Cyber Quest players who wanted to sabotage Lost Saga's reincarnation system so that Cyber Quest would have a huge advantage in the impending merger. Two Slayans were revealed to be brothers, and the much stronger third one (who later named himself Ban) was an AI created by Il-Ban. Ban has the power of all classes at master level and was given powers that were based on a combination between Yureka and Ijoyen/Neogia.

Known Battles

- #10
- #9
- Seidius, Archer, #8
- K.C, Thief
- Row, Swordsman (the only player who was not defeated)
- Whan, Swordsman, #4
- Lotto, Wizard/ Archmage
- Aradon, Magic Gladiator
- Olios, Archer; Remi, Warrior, #7
- Hata; Rasbal, Beastmaster, #6
- Basara, Gladiator

Note: Numbers represent the now abolished ranking in the Land of Dragons, PK zone. Names listed on the same line are players fought in the same battle.

=== Piri ===
Piri is a NPC character whose Roto crushed on but fell in love on Aradon. She is a NPC shopkeeper. Later in the chapter titled "this story again" on the last pages it shows a woman who looks like Piri lying in a bed hooked up to machines. This implies that she may have been a victim of a "killer"; seeing as she was in the same state as Jaeha who was killed by Elca. Later it shows that Piri, ingame as the shopkeeper, also has a key like many of regular players of Lost Saga.

== Classes ==
Single Classes

- Alchemist
- Archer
- Assassin
- Beast Master
- Cleric
- Freelancer
- Mage
- Necromancer
- Pikeman
- Priest
- Swordsman
- Thief
- Warrior
- Witch

Double Classes

- Force Master (Master Warrior and Mage)
- Dark/ Anti Priest (Master Necromancer and Priest)
- Temple Knight (Master Priest and Warrior)
- Wizard/ Archmage (Master Mage and partially mastered Swordsman)
- Magic Sword Master (Master Swordsman and Mage)
- Sword Master (Master Freelancer and Swordsman)
- Gladiator (Master Warrior and Sword Master)

Class Breakers

- Ranger (high levels in most classes; only ever achieved by the character Alpha, who pioneered it in an attempt to be a ninja)
