= Rhysmyth =

Original English-language manga series

- Cover of Rhysmyth vol. 1 (2007), art by Lincy Chan
- Genre: Action/adventure, romantic comedy, sport
- Author: Anthony Andora
- Illustrator: Lincy Chan
- Publisher: (United States) Tokyopop
- Original run: 2007 – ongoing
- Volumes: 2

Rhysmyth is an original English-language manga series created by writer Anthony Andora and artist Lincy Chan.

Although classified under Romance by Tokyopop, Rhysmyth can be described as a mixture of shōnen-style sports manga, comedy, and high school drama through the lens of underdog heroine Elena.

Lincy Chan, veteran of several Rising Stars of Manga contests, placed in the top-20 a year prior to pitching Rhysmyth.

Volume 1 was published in May 2007 and made the final list for the Young Adult Library Services Association 2008 Popular Paperbacks for Young Adults under the "Anyone Can Play" sports category. It was also nominated for "Great Graphic Novels" for teens.

Volume 2 was released on May 6, 2008.

== Main characters ==
Elena

- The lead. Searching for an extracurricular activity, she finds only rejection from her school's sports teams. When she stumbles down a flight of stairs and miraculously recovers, the Rhysmyth coach recruits her for the natural talents she displayed.

Wahzee

- The team captain. His natural chemistry with Elena is hidden under his obsessive passion for Rhysmyth.

Diocel

- Wahzee's rival. His attraction to Elena from the beginning is obvious.

Taylor

- Elena's rival on the Rhysmyth team. Taylor has bullied Elena (to no avail) since middle school.

== Reception ==
"As a comic, it feels like an Archie Comics title, but without the familiarity of the characters."—Leroy Douresseaux, Comic Book Bin. "I can see this book finding a welcome audience among young women, particularly if they're avid gamers."—A. E. Sparrow, IGN. "A more likeable cast of characters with believable motives could make Rhysmyth a lot more fun than it actually is."—Nadia Oxford, Mania. "Rhysmyth feels formulaic, despite being a cool idea for a game."—Clara Yamasaka, Newtype USA. "The characters and their wacky hijinks are clichéd and the art is stiff and blocky, but that can be forgiven if volume two continues to build on the tension created during the showdown between Elena and Taylor."—Eva Volin, Teenreads.com.
