= Boys Gilding the Lily Shall Die!? =

Japanese yuri manga

- Cover of the first tankōbon volume

百合にはさまる男は死ねばいい!? (Yuri ni Hasamaru Otoko wa Shineba Ii!?)
- Genre: Romance; Yuri
- Manga
- Written by: Yomogimochi
- Published by: Gentosha
- English publisher: NA: Tokyopop
- Imprint: Birz Comics
- Magazine: LINE Manga
- Original run: March 31, 2021 – present
- Volumes: 10

Boys Gilding the Lily Shall Die!? (百合にはさまる男は死ねばいい!?, Yuri ni Hasamaru Otoko wa Shineba Ii!?) is a Japanese yuri manga written and illustrated by Yomogimochi. It has been serialized online through Line Digital Frontier's online platform LINE Manga since March 31, 2021. It was licensed for an English-language release by Tokyopop in 2024.

== Synopsis ==
Chihaya Katagiri, the first trumpet in her school's brass band, becomes close to Hibiki Aikawa, a transfer student from a prestigious school who took her spot in band. Despite their rocky beginnings they both come to admire each other's talent and enthusiasm for playing the trumpet. As their feelings grow stronger, their lives become more complicated due to stress from classes, relationships, and their final high school band competition.

== Publication ==
Boys Gilding the Lily Shall Die!? was originally posted on Yomogimochi's Twitter and Pixiv accounts under the title A Comic About The Emotions Of The 1st and 2nd Trumpet Players In The Brass Band (吹奏楽部トランペットパートの1stと2ndの感情デカ漫画) on April 12, 2020. On March 31, 2021, it began a trial serialization on LINE Manga for 16 weeks under its current title. Following this trial, it was announced on July 21 that it could continue serialization, which started again on December 22 of the same year. On December 28, 2024, Yomogimochi announced that the series would resume its serialization under a new title; Your Timbre Brings Me to My Senses More Than a Kiss Would (キスよりも君の音色で目が醒める). Gentosha released seven tankōbon volumes in the series from May 24, 2023, to December 24, 2024, with LINE Digital Frontier releasing the series digitally from volume eight onward.

The series is licensed for an English release in North America by Tokyopop.

| No. | Original release date | Original ISBN | English release date | English ISBN |
|---|---|---|---|---|
| 1 | May 24, 2023 | 978-4-344-85224-2 | September 24, 2024 | 978-1-42-787923-3 |
| 2 | May 24, 2023 | 978-4-344-85225-9 | November 26, 2024 | 978-1-42-787924-0 |
| 3 | September 22, 2023 | 978-4-344-85300-3 | February 11, 2025 | 978-1-42-788061-1 |
| 4 | January 24, 2024 | 978-4-344-85356-0 | April 8, 2025 | 978-1-42-788062-8 |
| 5 | May 23, 2024 | 978-4-344-85414-7 | October 7, 2025 | 9781427883865 |
| 6 | September 24, 2024 | 978-4-344-85461-1 | November 18, 2025 | 9781427883858 |
| 7 | December 24, 2024 | 978-4-344-85518-2 | — | — |
| 8 | March 26, 2025 | — | — | — |
| 9 | June 25, 2025 | — | — | — |
| 10 | November 17, 2025 | — | — | — |

== Reception ==
In June 2022, Boys Gilding the Lily Shall Die!? was nominated for the Next Manga Award in the web manga category. It was nominated again in 2023 and placed nineteenth out of 50 nominees.
