= Metamo Kiss =

Japanese manga series by Sora Omote

- Cover of the first Tokyopop release

メタモ☆キス (Metamo Kisu)
- Genre: Romance, Comedy
- Manga
- Written by: Sora Omote
- Published by: Kadokawa Shoten
- English publisher: NA: Tokyopop
- Original run: 2004 – 2005
- Volumes: 3

Metamo Kiss (メタモ☆キス, Metamo Kisu; "Metamorphosis Kiss") is a shōjo manga authored by Sora Omote (おもて空良, Omote Sora), and published by Kadokawa Shoten. TokyoPop released three volumes were released in the United States by 2007.

== Story ==
Kohanamaru Taki is a young boy who moves to Tokyo after his grandmother dies. While he's walking, he accidentally bumps into someone, after apologizing, both go on their ways. Kohanamaru later realizes that he isn't in his own body, but in the girl's that he bumped into. The girl, Nanao Higashiyama, finds Kohanamaru demanding that they switch back, unfortunately he also doesn't know what's going on.

Kohanamaru later learns from his family has the unique ability to switch places with their soul mates when they touch a certain spot. For Kohanamaru it's his lips and his destined soul mate is a girl who likes someone else.

== Characters ==
=== Main characters ===
Kohanamaru Taki

A 14-year-old boy that recently moved to Tokyo to be with the rest of his family. While on the way there he accidentally bumps into a girl, in which they kiss. From that moment the two of them had switched bodies. She introduces herself as Nanao Higashiyama. Kohanamaru, just as shocked as she was, didn't know what to tell her. Nanao panics and tells Kohanamaru that she has a date with the boy she likes, having no choice, Kohanamaru goes on the date.

After Kohanamaru's date leaves and Nanao feels depressed on how the date turned out, she and Kohanamaru sit together watching the sunset, when they accidentally kiss, allowing them to return to normal. Kohanamaru learns after meeting his family, that their family has a special ability to switch bodies with the person you are destined to be with when you touch a certain spot. Kohanamaru can only switch by kissing, and his fated partner Nanao, likes another, that turns out to be Kohanamaru's twin brother Konatsu.

Through the series Kohanamaru develops feelings for Nanao. Also throughout the series it is revealed that if the partners switched, they must return to normal before sunset or they will be stuck in each other's bodies forever. This unfortunate event befell upon Kohanamaru and Nanao, and remained like that until they discovered a solution to return to normal. Near the end of the series Kohanamaru loses his memories of Nanao shortly after he confesses his love to her. Everyone in his family tries to help Kohanamaru remember, to no avail. His memories of her remain lost. Until the end of the chapter Kohanamaru bids farewell to Nanao stating he was glad to see her before he left for a trip with his father, and leaves Nanao.

Three years later, Kohanamaru runs into Nanao in the same fashion like the first time they met, and share an accidental kiss at the airport. They switch bodies and Nanao hugs him, happy to see him once again, he hugs her back, showing some evidence that during his absence he regained his memories of Nanao.

Nanao Higashiyama

Nanao Higashiyama is Kohanamaru's fated partner. She meets Kohanamaru when she bumps into him at the train station while hurrying to catch the next train. She soon realizes that she is not in her own body and rushes back to find the boy who switched with her. Kohanamaru has no knowledge as to what happened to them, Nanao panics when she realizes she cannot go on her date. Desperate she forces Kohanamaru to go on the date for her and tells Kohanamaru what to do in secret and to avoid embarrassing herself in front of the boy she liked.

Heartbroken that her date left Kohanamaru, thinking it was her. Nanao instantly thought he left because he did not like her. Kohanamaru tried to comfort her, in his efforts they accidentally kiss. She learns that she is Kohanamaru is her destined partner, in which she likes Kohanamaru's twin brother Konatsu. It is later revealed that the reason she liked Konatsu was because of an incident that occurred when she was a child. She explains that she went to the countryside and met a boy, that boy and her became friends. Nanao reminisced that she watched fireworks with him once and said they were very beautiful. She felt that boy was Konatsu when in truth it was really Kohanamaru.

In volume 2, it is revealed she is in the archery club, and has a talent for it. During an archery competition Kohanamaru takes Nanao's place when they kiss again by accident. This event caused Nanao's feelings of Kohanamaru to grow. More evidence suggesting Nanao's feelings for Kohanamaru is shown after her birthday party. When she notices that something was wrong with Kohanamaru. She is more greatly affected after Kohanamaru loses all his memories of her. She then discovers how much she really did love him after his father decides that Kohanamaru will leave with him to travel around the world.

At the end, a much older Nanao is seen walking through the airport. It is there she bumps into a man and accidentally kisses him, that man was Kohanamaru. She embraces him, and reminds him about the time they first met.

Konatsu Taki

Konatsu is Kohanamaru's twin brother. He is very popular at his school, because of his looks, athletics, and smarts. He is also the boy Nanao has a crush on. Konatsu is the only one in his family who cannot switch, but he is also the only one who can return the partners back to normal when they are unable to do it themselves. It is believed that Konatsu did not inherit the ability because of his twin brother, remaining the reason of Konatsu's jealousy towards Kohanamaru

Konatsu is a part of a love triangle between Nanao and Kohanamaru. Out of jealousy towards his brother for being able to switch, Konatsu tries to steal Nanao away from Kohanamaru. Konatsu later teams up with a girl named Madoka Shishihara, after she threatens him and mentions her interest in Kohanamaru.

At the end of volume 2, Nanao reveals that Konatsu for sometime had been planning to move to America and had done so. He later returns and reappears in chapter thirteen.

Though Konatsu's personality appears cold and distant, he truly cares for Nanao not just to make Kohanamaru jealous, and he also cares for Kohanamaru a lot as well.

=== Taki Family ===
Katsura Taki – Kohanamaru and Konatsu's mother.

Ichitaro Taki – The eldest son, he seems to understand a bit about their families abilities. He also dubs himself a "mama's boy".

Koharu Taki – The only daughter of the Taki family. Koharu's destined partner is the family cat Kojiro.

=== Minor characters ===
Madoka Shishihara

Madoka is a character that first showed up in chapter six. She has a huge obsession with unexplained phenomena and occultism. She has a crush on Kohanamaru and stalks him as a result. She teams up with Konatsu in order to un-cover the truth behind Nanao and Kohanamaru's ability to switch bodies. By appearance in chapter ten, she also practices the art of witchcraft, when she used a voodoo doll on Kohanamaru when he was in Nanao's body.

Aki Ichikawa

Known as "captain Ichi" by Nanao. Aki is the captain of the Archery club, she is in the ninth grade and will soon be graduating, and she passes the title of captain onto Nanao.

Akane

A small girl that Kohanamaru meets in volume 3. Like Kohanamaru, she comes from a family with special abilities. Akane tricks Kohanamaru into buying her sweets and taking her places. At the same time, some unusually lucky things happen. At the end of the chapter her family's secret ability is revealed, her family members before her have turned into plants; Akane then turns into a four-leaf clover, which is why all those lucky things happened to Kohanamaru. She later aids Nanao by allowing her to see Kohanamaru one last time before he leaves for his trip with his father.

Kikuo Hachiya

A boy who is madly in love with Nanao. Though his introduction is short, he still considers Kohanamaru his rival for Nanao's affection.

== Effects of Body Switching ==
Members of the Taki family (excluding Konatsu) can switches bodies with their fated partner by touching a certain spot. However they can only remain that way until sunset; any longer than that, and the change is permanent. Konatsu the only member of the Taki family that cannot switch, is also the only person that can un-do Nanao and Kohanamaru's transformation by simply kissing either partner. This however only affects Nanao and Kohanamaru and not other members of the family. There is another method to un-do the transformations.

Written in a notebook by Kohanamaru's deceased grandmother is a recipe to un-do the transformations. Ichitaro used the recipe in chapter eleven when Koharu failed to switch with Kojiro before the sun set.

Another effect of the body switching is that a member of the Taki family who switches with someone who is not their destined partner, will eventually lose all memories of that person. Such is the case when Kohanamaru started to forget Nanao or anything related to her. This could probably only happen because of Nanao's feelings for Konatsu. Though it is not impossible to regain their lost memories, as Kohanamaru's father stated:

"True destiny is thick and strong. So if it's real, this won't serve it for good. Let's watch and see just how strong their destiny is."
