= My Dead Girlfriend =

2007 English-language manga

- Cover of My Dead Girlfriend vol. 1 (2007), art by Eric Wight
- Genre: Horror, romantic comedy
- Author: Eric Wight
- Publisher: Tokyopop
- Original run: 2007
- Volumes: 1

My Dead Girlfriend is an original English-language manga written and illustrated by Eric Wight, published by Tokyopop. The first and only volume, "A Tryst Of Fate", was published in 2007. It has received positive reviews from the likes of Joss Whedon, Jeph Loeb and Meg Cabot.

== Volumes ==
- Wight, Eric. My Dead Girlfriend, volume 1. Tokyopop. 6 February 2007. ISBN 978-1-59816-996-6

== Characters ==
=== The Bleaks ===
The Bleak bloodline has an abnormal legacy, its extremely odd deaths.

Phineas "Finney" Bleak
The protagonist of the story and one of the four breathing Bleaks (besides Mookie), he was very depressed during the last three months before the first novel started because of a recent supposed breakup. He had been "seriously debating the pros and cons of breathing" because he thought it didn't matter, seeing as he knew that the final fate of all was death. At school, he is one of the few not in a social circle. He is singled out because he is the only "normal" person in the school. He's a loner.
April, May, and June Bleak
Conjoined triplets who are Finney's older sisters, known to him as the Trouble Trifecta. They are the other three living Bleaks besides Finney (not including Mookie).
Lester Bleak and his unnamed wife
Finney and the triplets' parents, who died by being electrocuted in the tunnel of love.
Cornelius Bleak
A pirate captain who was shot, stabbed, flambéed, and devoured by a great white shark before finally dying. He originally foresaw his death in a series of premonitions, but pushed his luck by giving up his seafaring life...after one last voyage. Alas his crew (rather sick of him) mutinied and in the process of trying to end his life with a gunshot (rather than be thrown overboard...where he'd surely be consumed)...ignited their barrels of gunpowder...with fatal explosive results. This current cruise being their final one...for the entire onboard occupants period.
Archibald Bleak
A zookeeper who was killed by two tons of manure while washing the backside of a constipated elephant. It was undetermined which killed him: being crushed or suffocated.
Orville Bleak
A self-proclaimed inventor who tried to cross the Atlantic in a lawn chair suspended by 837 inflated balloons. He miscalculated the amount of helium in each of the balloons, disappeared into the sky, and was never seen again.
Margaret Bleak
A magician's assistant who was sawed in half after her jealous illusionist husband discovered she was performing her "sleight of hand" with a rival magician.
Mookie Bleak
The family pet, who happens to be a gargoyle. He behaves like a puppy but looks more like crossbreed between canine and demonic creature, still Finney and his sisters can look past the fearsome beast and see the cute animal within. He's got plenty to say with expression and pantomime.

=== Mephisto Prep ===
Social circles are listed below.

The Deadbeats
At the top of the evolutionary ladder, the Deadbeats rule the school with a heavy dose of scare tactics and humiliation. It has four members.
- Drake Rippinngton- a vampire who is the leader of Deadbeats and thus, the student dictator of the school.
- Karl Steinman- a Frankenstein-like monster who is the enforcer of the Deadbeats. Also see Stanley.
- Hank Palmer- A werewolf gangster complete with gold chain necklace with dollar sign attached.
- Floyd Gillman- A Creature from the Black Lagoon who only makes gurgles when he talks.
The Glindas
These witches push potions like amphetamines. Want to be thin? Need to ace a test? Feel like parting with your soul? The Glindas are one-stop shopping. They are led by Salamander Mugwort.
The Aberzombies
Undead kids who take non-conformity to such an extreme that they must conform to each other or be harshly ridiculed. (Reference to Emos, one of the many pop culture references hidden throughout the book.)
The Lab Monkeys
Mad scientists who each could build a flux capacitor before their seventh birthday.
The Invertebrates
These spineless blobs will do anything because of peer pressure.
The Foreign Exchange
Kids from another planet, not another country.
Stanley
A mummy of an unknown social circle who usually is at the receiving ends of Karl's bullying.

Vice Principal Blackheart
A no-nonsense devil, she is blonde-haired, fair-skinned, and has two white horns growing out of her head.

Jenny Wraith
Object of desire for Finney. They met at a fun fair and instantly connected, with it being love at first sight for Jenny. Unfortunately, soon after they parted, jealous Death saw fit to throw a metaphorical spanner into the works vis-a-vis their relationship via Jenny accidentally falling down a rabbit hole and presumably dying, thus finding herself to be non-corporeal. Knowing how he (Finney) despised ghosts due to his troublesome spirit relatives, she has only recently revealed to him her current situation. She now resides at Mephisto Middle School and struggles to overcome the obstacles of being dead and how they affect her blossoming romance with Finney.
