= Gothic Sports =

Manga-style comic by Anike Hage

- Front cover of the first volume of Gothic Sports.

Publication information
- Publisher: Tokyopop
- Genre: Humor/comedy
- Publication date: 1 July 2007 – April 2010
- No. of issues: 5

Creative team
- Created by: Anike Hage

Gothic Sports is a German graphic novel created by Anike Hage. The protagonist is a young girl named Anya, who is adjusting to her new school. When Anya tries to join various sports teams, she is repeatedly rejected. Because of this, she forms her own soccer team, thus creating the first Gothic Lolita soccer team. The book was licensed by Tokyopop for English distribution, with the first volume released on July 1, 2007. Soon after, other volumes were released.

== Release date ==
- Volume 1 was released on July 1, 2007.
- Volume 2 was released on October 1, 2007.
- Volume 3 was released on January 8, 2008.
- Volume 4 was released in January 2010.
- Volume 5 was released in Germany in April 2010. It was released in Spain by Dreamers.

== Plot ==
Anya arrives at Lucrece High School on her first day and is hoping to play for one of the sports teams. She first tries to play basketball, but is rejected by the coaches and other students because of her height. Anya then decides to join the soccer team. There, she meets Julia, who is already a member of the team but never gets to play any games, because the school team is one of the best and the coach is worried that having girls on the team would weaken it.

This discrimination inspires Anya to go to the principal of the school, who agrees to let her form her own team with one condition; Her team must have a test match against the school's official team. Anya, with help from her friends, forms a team consisting of the "misfits" of the school. She starts with Luise (commonly called Loo), whom she has known since elementary school, and Felicitas (commonly called Filiz) who is known for her Gothic Lolita style of dress. Filiz's style gets the team noticed, especially when she designs the team uniforms which have a clear Gothic Lolita style: mostly black with a dark maroon stripe down one side and a smaller stripe crossing it along the top. The boys on the team have similar red stripes on their shorts, while the girls wear skirts with the red stripes along with striped stockings with lace. The girls also wear lace collars.

The team eventually attracts 11 members needed to form a team. The side consists of Delia, who acts as the coach of the team and has a close personal relationship with the coach of the official school team (in the third book he is revealed to be her ex-boyfriend); Leon, who Anya has hated since elementary ever since he accidentally killed her hamster; Kevin, a musician known for his temper; Fraternal twins Alexia and Hannes, who joined in support of Anya after she was denied the chance to join the basketball team; Ellis, who is not as strong as the other players; and Olga, who likes Renaissance fashion.

Throughout the graphic novels, there are some unidentified characters in the stories. The group is made up of a small number of students (chiefly a group of three). They are presumed to be from another school, who are interested in facing Anya's team in a match. These characters have been seen watching, taking pictures of, and discussing the fledgling team. Their identities have not yet been revealed.

The books follow the school team, named "Gothic Sports", as they train and try to compete against other school football teams, including their main rivals, Lucrece High School's official team.

== Reception ==
Comics publications picked up the first volume of Gothic Sports. The theme of ‘gothic fashion + high-school sport' was emphasized by the Beat and the simplicity of the line work and the characters' inner thoughts were praised in Otaku News.

== Media ==
=== Graphic novels ===
The series is also licensed in French by Soleil Manga, and in Finland by Pauna Media Group. and in Denmark by Carlsen.

No.	Original release date	Original ISBN	North American release date	North American ISBN
01	February 2006	978-3-86580-194-4	May 8, 2007	978-1-59816-992-8
02	January 2007	978-3-86580-194-4	September 11, 2007	978-1-59816-993-5
03	September 2007	978-3-86719-128-9	January 8, 2008	978-1-59816-994-2
04	January 2009	978-3-86719-129-6	—	—
05	April 2010	978-3-86719-130-2	—	—
