= The Margrave's Daughter & the Enemy Prince =

Japanese manga series

- First tankōbon volume cover

売られた辺境伯令嬢は隣国の王太子に溺愛される (Urareta Henkyō Haku Reijō wa Ringoku no Ōtaishi ni Dekiai Sareru)
- Genre: Fantasy; Romance
- Manga
- Written by: An Ogura
- Published by: Futabasha
- English publisher: NA: Tokyopop
- Imprint: Monster Comics f
- Magazine: Comic CMoa; Cycomi; (October 12, 2022 – August 26, 2026)
- Original run: April 16, 2022 – July 11, 2026
- Volumes: 15

The Margrave's Daughter & the Enemy Prince (売られた辺境伯令嬢は隣国の王太子に溺愛される, Urareta Henkyō Haku Reijō wa Ringoku no Ōtaishi ni Dekiai Sareru) is a Japanese manga series written and illustrated by An Ogura. It was serialized on NTT Solmare's Comic CMoa website from April 2022 to July 2026, with its volume releases handled by Futabasha.

== Synopsis ==
Anna, the daughter of the Margrave of Halmich, has no interest in fulfilling what people expect of her by marrying a nobleman. She prefers to improve on her swordsmanship so she can join her father in battle in the future. One day, the Kingdom of Albion takes over Halmich, kills the margrave, and holds Anna's brother hostage, forcing the Halmich family to sell Anna to the Kingdom of Albion. As she heads into the Albion kingdom, Anna starts plotting her revenge on those who killed her father.

== Characters ==
Anna Halmich (アンナ・ハルミッヒ, Anna Harumihhi)
Voiced by: Sayumi Suzushiro (vomic)
Kenneth (ケネス, Kenesu)
Voiced by: Nobunaga Shimazaki (vomic)

== Media ==
=== Manga ===
Written and illustrated by An Ogura, The Margrave's Daughter & the Enemy Prince was serialized on NTT Solmare's Comic CMoa website from April 16, 2022, to July 11, 2026. It was also parallelly serialized on Cygames' Cycomi manga website from October 12, 2022, to August 26, 2026. The series' chapters have been collected by Futabasha into fifteen tankōbon volumes as of November 2026. The series is licensed in English by Tokyopop.

A side story centered around the character Iris has been announced.

| No. | Original release date | Original ISBN | North American release date | North American ISBN |
|---|---|---|---|---|
| 1 | December 9, 2022 | 978-4-575-41542-1 | February 11, 2025 | 978-1-4278-8060-4 |
1. "The Sold-Off Daughter"; 2. "I Won't Allow It"; 3. "Assassination"; 4. "A Monster"; 5. "An Interesting Woman"; 6. "To the Capital"; 7. "Teasing"; 8. "The Bridal Night"; 9. "The Greatest Lady on the Continent"
| 2 | January 7, 2023 | 978-4-575-41563-6 | April 15, 2025 | 978-1-4278-8088-8 |
10. "A New Life"; 11. "An Insult"; 12. "No Elegance"; 13. "The Right Way to Live"; 14. "Fiancée"; 15. "Outcast"; 16. "Power Balance"; 17. "Resolution"; 18. "The Prince's Ambition"; 19. "The Weak and the Strong"; 20. "I Order You"
| 3 | March 10, 2023 | 978-4-575-41600-8 | June 3, 2025 | 978-1-4278-8092-5 |
21. "The Meaning of Unfortunately"; 22. "The Woman He's Been Searching For"; 23. "The Royal Palace's Cavalry"; 24. "Childhood Friends"; 25. "Greeting His Mother"; 26. "A Mischievous Child"; 27. "Riot"; 28. "Speech"; 29. "The Eclipse Family"; 30. "A Marriage Proposal"; 31. "Talent"
| 4 | May 10, 2023 | 978-4-575-41641-1 | August 5, 2025 | 978-1-4278-8285-1 |
32. "Strategist"; 33. "A Reason to Live"; 34. "Dignity"; 35. "A Precious Friend"; 36. "An Elegant Idea"; 37. "The Day of the Play"; 38. "Climax"; 39. "I Was Lonely"; 40. "I Missed You"; 41. "Infiltration"; 42. "A Caring Heart"; Bonus
| 5 | September 8, 2023 | 978-4-575-41728-9 | October 7, 2025 | 978-1-4278-8286-8 |
43. "Using Any Methods Necessary"; 44. "War"; 45. "The Final Warning"; 46. "I'll End This Country"; 47. "If That's What You Want..."; 48. "Your Presence Is Key"; 49. "A True Lady"; 50. "More Trustworthy Than Anyone Else"; 51. "An Impeccable Lady"; 52. "The Country I Want to Create"; 53. "The Grand Tea Party"; 54. "The Country's King"; Bonus
| 6 | January 10, 2024 | 978-4-575-41801-9 | January 27, 2026 | 978-1-4278-8587-6 |
55. "An Engagement"; 56. "A Declaration"; 57. "The End"; 58. "I'll Make Him Happy"; 59. "Kenneth in Captivity"; 60. "All Mine"; 61. "Iris Eclipse"; 62. "The End of a Dream"; 63. "Impossible"; 64. "Hostage"; 65. "Revolution"; 66. "Puppet"; Bonus
| 7 | May 10, 2024 | 978-4-575-41877-4 | March 24, 2026 | 978-1-4278-8590-6 |
67. "True Peace"; 68. "The Fall"; 69. "Screaming"; 70. "Conditions"; 71. "Mother and Daughter"; 72. "Farewell"; 73. "Surprise Attack"; 74. "Chance of Victory"; 75. "Battlefield"; 76. "A Hero"; 77. "A Story"; 78. "Friends"; Bonus
| 8 | June 10, 2024 | 978-4-575-41901-6 | May 12, 2026 | 978-1-4278-8591-3 |
79. "Strategy"; 80. "Freedom"; 81. "Arrangements"; 82. "One's Duty"; 83. "Goddess"; 84. "Oath"; 85. "Siblings"; 86. "The Letter"; 87. "Royal Decree"; 88. "Love and Hate"; Bonus
| 9 | November 9, 2024 | 978-4-575-42011-1 | — | — |
| 10 | March 10, 2025 | 978-4-575-42098-2 | — | — |
| 11 | June 10, 2025 | 978-4-575-42162-0 | — | — |
| 12 | November 10, 2025 | 978-4-575-42280-1 | — | — |
| 13 | March 10, 2026 | 978-4-575-42365-5 | — | — |
| 14 | July 10, 2026 | 978-4-575-42465-2 | — | — |
| 15 | November 10, 2026 | 978-4-575-42542-0 | — | — |

=== Other ===
A voice comic adaptation commemorating the release of the second volume was uploaded to Futabasha's YouTube channel on January 10, 2023. The voice comic featured the voices of Sayumi Suzushiro and Nobunaga Shimazaki.

== Reception ==
By July 2026, the series had over 3 million copies in circulation.
