= ShutterBox =

Original English-language manga series

- Genre: Action/adventure, fantasy
- Author: Rikki Simons, Tavisha Wolfgarth-Simons
- Publisher: Tokyopop
- Original run: 2003 – ongoing
- Volumes: 5

ShutterBox is an original English-language manga written by Rikki Simons and Tavisha Wolfgarth-Simons. The first volume was published by Tokyopop in 2003. The second volume was published in July 2004. The third volume was released in August 2005 and the fourth volume was released in September 2007. As of September 22, 2011 five volumes have been released in eBook format and are available to buy on their shop.

== Plot summary ==
When Megan Amano dreams, she journeys to a place called Merridiah University, one of the afterlife's premier educational institutes. There she studies as an exchange student, learning the skills necessary to become a living muse. Traditionally, only spirits attend the university, where they are educated before being reborn into the world of the living. However, Megan is still alive. She attends college in Santa Monica, California by day and Merridiah University at night. One day, she finds mysterious pictures from the dream world in her digital camera. They reveal a mystery so deep that Megan is compelled to question her very existence and set forth on a quest to find the answers.

== Characters ==
- Megan Amano (ShutterBox) is a pink-haired, short American girl of Japanese and English descent who often gets teased about looking like a child. She has an odd laugh when nervous and tends to panic easily. Her father died of a heart attack before the first volume, for which she blames her mother "Frankie". Being known as a geek in science fiction, she has trouble making friends and prefers to either read fantasy books or write in her diary. Due to a banshee attack, Megan is sharing bodies with the doll-like queen of Merridiah, Laahli. In a previous life Megan, AJ, Dane, and Thomas lived in England together in the late 1800s. She had three children with Dane, but raised all eight of his children with him. She and the children fled on a boat to America but it sank and they all ultimately drowned; the children were cursed to stay with Dane in Immiserriah until Laahli freed them to be reborn on Earth. Megan, however disappeared for a long time until now. She quickly takes a liking towards muse AJ and a disliking towards his brother Dane.
- Adrien Jay "AJ" Crandall (Angel of Childhood's End) is a carefree and irresponsible young man who is cursed to always end his life at the age of eighteen. He and Dane are cursed twins of the Cr'nadiahls that helped banshees kill the Queen Laahli's soul. The king cursed the Cr'nadiahls that any children born of the twins (Dane and A.J.) would have to stay in Immiserriah, and that the twins would be "stewards chained to the university of Merridiah forever." AJ lost his sense of responsibility and does not take his job as a muse seriously. During the time he should spend musing he spends teaching and playing with the beebos (the alternate forms of the children of Megan and Dane.)
- Damien "Dane" Crandall (Angel of Death Unbalanced) is the uncaring twin of AJ. Because he is under the same curse as AJ, he lost his conscience. In the 1890s he was married to Megan and fathered eight children (three of them with her; which are Isabella, Arthur and Malachi) He tends to be a jerk and hold a long-standing grudge against Megan because he believes she broke his heart in their past life. Dane kept his children in Immiserriah while Megan was missing.
- Khaa is Dane's lost conscience in the form of a crow. Because of the curse, Dane can never come out to the Mindfields where Khaa lives; Khaa attacks him if he does.
- Dagny Gilhooley (ShutterBox's First Aid) is Megan's best friend since they were children. Dagny fell in love with Petier when she met him at the flower shop near Megan's house and ended up going to Merridiah with Megan. She wasn't aware, but for over a year she used to be a baker in Merridiah when she fell asleep. She's killed in Volume 2 and now stays in Merridiah and works as Megan's First Aid.
- Petier Troia is Merridiah's Headmaster (Angel of Enlightenment), the twin's uncle, Megan's former psychiatrist, and flower shop owner. He has a relationship with Dagny in Merridiah.
- Thomas Kelly "Thom" Jenkins (Student Disembodied President) is AJ's cross-dressing best friend who also goes by the name of Thomasina "Tina". Thom also keeps a host of pixies under his hat.
- Caroline Egalotry (Muse of Murderers) a snooty girl who has a crush on AJ. She's very cold and egotistical, going so far as to steal Thom's cookie recipe just because it was better than hers. She's Dagny's roommate in Merridiah.

== Volume 1 ==
Orientation, Damien, Adrien, and the Running of the Hyperpans

The story begins right after graduation of high school in Santa Monica. Megan Amano is wandering the beach trying to seek slight solitude from her friend Dagny and fellow students. While there she watches Adrien 'AJ' Crandall, a fellow high school graduate, walk into the freezing water and disappears. Later on, Megan is in therapy, requested by her mother Frankie, talking about her dreams to her therapist, Peiter Troia. She tells him about a place that she visits when she dreams, a place called Merridiah. While there she sees Adrien running through the fields.

That night after her session, she heads home (which is next to her mother's) and falls asleep being sent to another part of Merridiah. After she meets the Beebos (flying rabbits) she meets Damien, AJ's twin brother. Once she is given a more sophisticated dress instead of her sleepwear, she is sent to the fields with a letter that she must give to AJ. She landed next to a banshee and accidentally gives it attention, causing it to explode. Megan continues her journey in finding muse. After she catches him (literally) she gives him his letter and he leaves her there, alone.

== Volume 2 ==
First School Quarter

== Volume 3 ==
Entry Exam

== Volume 4 ==
The Angel of Childhood's End

== Volume 5 ==
The Angel of Death Unbalanced
