= I Luv Halloween =

Horror-comedy original English-language manga

- Cover of I Luv Halloween vol. 2 (2006), art by Benjamin Roman
- Genre: Horror, humor/comedy
- Author: Keith Giffen
- Illustrator: Benjamin Roman
- Publisher: (Canada) (United States) Tokyopop
- Demographic: Teen
- Original run: 2005–2007
- Volumes: 3

I Luv Halloween is a horror-comedy original English-language (OEL) manga written by Keith Giffen and illustrated by Benjamin Roman. In North America, Tokyopop released the series in three volumes from October 2005 to September 2007 and re-released it as one volume in October 2008. Menford Electronic Art also adapted it into animated short episodes which premiered on Myspace. Set on Halloween, the series focuses on a group of trick-or-treating children and their misadventures.

Roman envisioned the concept of the series and after he moved to Los Angeles, Tokyopop agreed to publish it with Giffen, who had adapted several Tokyopop manga, as the writer. Though positively received by readers, I Luv Halloween gained mixed-to-negative reviews from critics. The Young Adult Library Services Association, a division of the American Library Association, placed the first two volumes on its 2007 list of "Quick Picks for Reluctant Young Adult Readers".

== Plot ==
Incorporating dark comedy, I Luv Halloween follows a group of children as they go trick-or-treating each Halloween: Finch, the leader of the bunch; Moochie, his homicidal younger sister; Devil Lad, who only appears on Halloween to join the group; Pig Pig, a simple-minded boy; the perverted Mr. Kitty; and his mostly silent younger brother Spike.

I Luv Halloween consists of three self-contained volumes. In the first volume, the children seek revenge after receiving apples, pennies, and candy which they dislike. Meanwhile, Moochie wanders away from Finch and kills the town bullies with a brassiere stolen from Nips, the town cheerleader. Obsessed with teeth, Moochie also extracts the molars of her victims. Finch and his group attempt to retrieve the brassiere from Moochie; however, after a series of deaths, they end up prematurely burying Nips.

In the second volume, they learn that the townspeople have become zombies. Moochie embarks on a quest to drive out the "Chonkolit monkeys", and encounters a group of sisters: Vera, Vivian, and Vincent. Moochie takes Vera with her to hunt the king of the monkeys. Meanwhile, Finch and Mr. Kitty escape from a Christian couple by severely burning the wife. Her husband chases after them, only to be killed by Moochie. She then has Vera exorcise the king of the monkeys from him. In the third volume, Finch and his group discover that the town is experiencing an alien invasion. Mr. Kitty sneaks into one of the aliens' spaceships when he sees them carrying off Nips. Finch and Pig Pig follow him onto the spaceship, only to discover that the aliens have sewn his head to Nips's body. Curious about abortions, Moochie sets out to revive a fetus whom she believes is her sister. Along the way, she tortures and kills the town doctor. His son, whom Moochie also tortures, sees this as a hate crime and sets off a biochemical targeting all the people of Caucasian descent. He and Devil Lad leave the town afterward.

== Development and publication ==
Illustrator Benjamin Roman made his professional debut with the first volume of I Luv Halloween; he wanted to create "something that was offbeat and a little gory, but with a kind of humor and playfulness." Having spent years trying to get into the comic book industry, he moved to Los Angeles, California, in 2003, and worked at Kinko's in Hollywood; there, he met a Tokyopop employee, who passed along some of his "rejected proposals" to now-former editor Mark Paniccia. Keith Giffen, an American comic book illustrator and writer who had previously adapted the Tokyopop-licensed manga Battle Royale and Battle Vixens for an English-language audience, joined the project as the writer. Together, they spent three to four years working on the series. Although Roman did not draw the series with any particular influences in mind, he read Calvin and Hobbes and Marvel books as a child. Drawing inspiration from science-fiction and horror films in general, Roman acknowledged that "some of that same kitsch finds itself in I Luv Halloween." For the plot, Roman and Giffen were given "a lot of leeway creatively," and Roman commented: "I think that we were seeing how irresponsible we could go with that story and still get away with it. We were just trying to let loose with the characters, however violent that mentality m[a]y have turned at some points." As a way to celebrate the conclusion of the series, Roman gave away more than one hundred pages of I Luv Halloween artwork and five hundred replicas of Finch's mask at the 2007 San Diego Comic-Con.

The three I Luv Halloween volumes were published in North America by Tokyopop from October 11, 2005, to September 11, 2007. Tokyopop later re-released the series in a single volume, I Luv Halloween: Ultimate Twisted Edition (ISBN 978-1-4278-1072-4), with colored illustrations and a bonus story on October 1, 2008. The series is also published in Germany by Tokyopop Germany and in France by Akileos. However, in May 2011, Tokyopop shut down its North American branch, with the publishing status of original, OEL titles left unclear. I Luv Halloween also spawned an animated adaptation produced by Menfond Electronic Arts and released by Tokyopop in July 2007 as featured content on MySpace TV. Ben Chan wrote an original music score for the I Luv Halloween short episodes.

=== Volume list ===
No.	Release date	ISBN
01	October 11, 2005	978-1-59532-831-1
01: "Finch"; 02: "Pig Pig"; 03: "Bubbles and Squeak"; 04: "Li'l Bith"; 05: "Mush"; 06: "Moochie"
02	March 7, 2006	978-1-59532-832-8
01: "Dead Things"; 02: "Nose Candy"; 03: "Chonklit Monkeys"; 04: "Hhhik uh Heeet"; 05: "King of the Chonklit Monkeys"; 06: "Yay!"
03	September 11, 2007	978-1-59532-833-5
01: "White Boys Can't Fly"; 02: "Triple K"; 03: "Becky-Beck"; 04: "Jumping the Shark"; 05: "Close Encounters of the Wrong Kind"; 06: "Mutually Assured Destruction"

== Reception ==
I Luv Halloween was positively received by English-language readers. The first volume debuted at the 49th spot on a list of the top 100 bestselling graphic novels and sold an estimated 1,650 copies. The second volume sold 1,403 copies and appeared at the 92nd spot. The third volume debuted at the 73rd spot with 1,440 copies sold. Daily Variety named I Luv Halloween one of Tokyopop's top ten biggest titles.

I Luv Halloween received mixed to negative reviews from critics. The art style drew criticism, and two critics compared the character designs to those of the Garbage Pail Kids. Conversely, KJB of IGN wrote that Roman's art style complemented Giffen's writing nicely. PopCultureShock's former senior manga editor Katherine Dacey thought that the colored illustrations in the re-release improved the art style. Another point of criticism was the use of dark comedy. Leroy Douresseaux of Coolstreak Cartoon compared the characters and tone of the series to "a lame version of the TV show “Jackass”". Dacey wrote that the inclusion of fan service and "truly tasteless jokes" prevented I Luv Halloween from becoming an enjoyable read. While writing that the series "isn't the best original manga to hit the shelves", KJB commented on the "wickedly perverse sense of humor at play here" that at times became "a little too broad", and enjoyed that the first volume did not end on a cliffhanger. Another reviewer for IGN, A.E. Sparrow put the series on his list of the ten best horror/thriller manga. The Young Adult Library Services Association, a division of the American Library Association, placed the first two volumes on its 2007 list of "Quick Picks for Reluctant Young Adult Readers".
