= List of series run in Comic Champ =

Comic Champ is a comics anthology magazine published by Daewon C.I. in South Korea. Below is a list of all titles serialized in the magazine and released under its book imprint Champ Comics. Titles are separated into domestic publications and translated works licensed from foreign publishing companies.

== Domestic titles ==
=== 1990s ===
Comic Champ began in 1991 as Boy Champ (소년챔프) to complete with the already successful IQ Jump by Seoul Manhwasa. Comic Champ debuted with many popular manhwa series like Pagumki, about an emperor who gets his hands on a beyond powerful sword, and Rebirth about a man named Sang-Ho Do who ran a group of spiritual investigators.

Title	Began	Ended	Creator
Eojjeonji…Jeonyeok (Korean: 어쩐지…저녁, lit. '"Somehow…in the Evening"')	1993	1994	Lee Myeong-jin (이명진)
Taepungui Gonggyeoksu (Korean: 태풍의 공격수, lit. '"Possible Attack of Typhoon"')	1993	1995	Lee Yong-tak (이용탁)
Ragnarök (Korean: 라그나로크)	1995	2001	Lee Myung-jin (이명진)
No No Boy (Korean: 노노 보이)	1994	1996	Jeon Se-hun (전세훈)
Sasinjeon (Korean: 푸르뫼)	1995	1998	Art: Pu Reu-moe (푸르뫼), Story: Kang Tae-jun (강태준)
Good Morning! Teacher (Korean: 굿모닝! 티처)	1996	1999	Seo Yeong-ung (서영웅)
Fight Ball (Korean: 파이트볼)	1996	2000	Park Chul-ho (박철호)
8x8 (Korean: 8x8)	1997	1997	Seong Jong-hwa (성종화)
Mister Bu (Korean: 미스터 부)	1997	1997	Jeon Sangyeong (전상영)
Geomppangmaen (Korean: 검빵맨, lit. '"The Very Sword"')	1997	1999	Choe Mi-reu (최미르)
Rebirth (Korean: 리버스 (REBIRTH), romanized: Libis, lit. 'Rebirth (REBIRTH)')	1998	2010	Lee Kang-woo (이
Majic Academy Zeus (Korean: 매직 아카데미 제우스)	1998	1998	Son Hui-jun (손희준)
Yoho!! (Korean: 야호!!)	1998	1999	Ryu Byeong-min (류병민)
Geomjeong Gomusin (Korean: 검정 고무신, lit. '"Black Rubber Shoes"')	1998	2006	Art: Doremi (도래미), Story: Lee U-yeong (이우영)
Gangho, Paedogi (Korean: 강호패도기; Chinese: 江湖覇道記, lit. '"Veteran Black Pottery"')	1998	2008	Choe Mi-reu (최미르)
Samgukjanggunjeon (Korean: 삼국장군전, lit. '"Before the Three Generals of the Bureau Armies"')	1998	2008	Park Su-yeong (박수영)
Madojeongi Albion (Korean: 마도전기 알비온, lit. '"Defiant Flag in the Rain"')	1999	1999	Seong Gyeong-jae (성경재)
Jungle Bell (Korean: 정글벨)	1999	1999	Lee Ik-seon (이익선)
Raven (Korean: 레이븐)	1999	2001	Seo Young-ung (서영웅)
Shooting (Korean: 슈팅)	1999	2002	Jeon Se-hun (전세훈)
Jjang (Korean: 짱, lit. 'Boss')	1999	2014	Lim Jae-won (임재원)
Chronicles of the Cursed Sword (Korean: 파검기, romanized: PaGumKi, lit. 'Wave Sword')	1999	2008	Art: Yeo Beop-ryong (여법룡), Story: Park Hui-jin (박희진)

=== 2000s ===
Boy Champ correctly changed its name to Comic Champ and had even more popular series that had their licence in the United States by Tokyopop.

Title	Began	Ended	Creator
Yongyeori (Korean: 용열이, lit. 'Ten')	2000	2000	Lee Jae-seok (이재석)
Dangsineun Eneonsaege Maja Bon Jeogi Itnayo (Korean: 당신은 천사에게 맞아 본 적이 있나요, lit. 'You've Seen the Angel Right There')	2000	2000	Yun Seok (윤석)
Dummy Run (Korean: 더미런, romanized: Deomireon)	2000	2001	Bae Seong-hwan (배성환)
Mirimbanjeom Suhoyeoljeon (Korean: 미림반점 수호열전, lit. 'Mirin Fierce Guardian Spot')	2000	2001	Lee Hyeon-seok (이현석)
Mutjima Gajok (Korean: 묻지마 가족, lit. 'Don't Ask the Family')	2000	2001	Art: Lee Tak (이탁), Story: Yeom Jeong-hun (염정훈)
Threads of Time (Korean: 살례탑, romanized: Sal Le Top)	2000	2003	Noh Mi-young (노미영)
Blazin' Barrels (Korean: 웨스턴 샷건, romanized: Weysu Syasgan, lit. 'Western Shotgun')	2000	2010	Park Min-seo (박민서)
King of Hell (Korean: 마제, romanized: Majeh, lit. 'Evil Sacrifice')	2001	2016	Art: Ran In-soo (나인수), Story: Kim Jae-hwan (김재환)
Baccus (Korean: 박카스, romanized: Bakkaseu)	2001	2001	Art: Park Jin-seok (박진석), Story: Han Hui-jin (한희진)
Peulleosi! (Korean: 플러시!, lit. 'Flush!')	2001	2001	Lee Gi-heun (이기훈)
She's Scorer (Korean: 쉬콜러, romanized: Swikolleo)	2001	2001	Mun Seong-gi (문성기)
Alien Hunter (Korean: 에어리언 헌터, romanized: Eeoneon Heonteo)	2001	2002	Kim Deok-jin (김덕진)
Bultaneun Orikkwon Bu (Korean: 불타는 오리꿘 부, lit. '"Minor Burns"')	2001	2002	Mun Hui-seok (문희석)
Gutseeora! Magach-A (Korean: 굳세어라! 마가크-A, lit. 'Fighting! Magach-A')	2001	2002	Jeong Dong-su (정동수)
Haebaragi Kkocminam (Korean: 해바라기 꽃미남, lit. '"Handsome Sunflower"')	2001	2002	Kim Yong-hoe (김용회)
Hong Gil-dong Neo² (Korean: 홍길동 Neo², romanized: Hong Gil-dong Neosu Squara, lit. 'East Path Neo²')	2001	2002	Kim Je-hyeon (김제현)
Wild Teacher (Korean: 와일드 티처)	2001	2002	Jung Ki-chul (정기철)
Gadirok (Korean: 가디록)	2001	2003	Hwang Jeong-ho (황정호)
PhD: Phantasy Degree (Korean: 마스터스쿨 올림프스, romanized: Maseuteo Seukur Ollimpeuseu, lit. 'Master School Olimpus')	2001	2004	Son Hui-jun (손희준)
Song Chang Ho Jushin (Korean: 손창호 Jushin, lit. '"Hand Window Jushin"')	2002	2002	Lee Tae-ho (이태호)
America America (Korean: 아메리카 아메리카, romanized: Amerika Amerika)	2002	2003	Art: Jang Sung (장성), Story: Son Chang-ho (손창호)
Sarib Yeongung Hagwon Cheon (Ten) (사립영웅학원 천(天) (Korean: Private School of (Ten)thousand Heroes))	2002	2003	Son Byeong-jun (손병준)
Recast (comics) (Korean: 리캐스트, romanized: Rikaeseuteu)	2003	2004	Kye Seung-hui (계승희)
A.I. Hunter (에이아이헌터)	2004	2004	Jung Soo-chul (정수철)
Adrenalin (아드레날린)	2004	2004	Lee Jung-hwa (이정화)
Gouneyoseogui Romance (Korean: 그녀석의 로망, romanized: The Kid's Romance)	2004	2005	Son Byeong-jun (손병준)
Pineapple (Korean: 파인애플, romanized: Painaepeul)	2004	2005	Ahn Kwang-hyun (안광현)
Sweety (Korean: 스위티, romanized: Seawiti)	2004	2005	Art: Park Jae-sung (박재성), Story: Kim Ju-ri (김주리)
Casting (Korean: 캐스팅, romanized: Kaeseuting)	2004	2006	Art: Kitt (킷트), Story: Park Sang-yong (박상용)
Live (Korean: 라이브(LIVE), romanized: Raibu, lit. 'Live')	2004	2006	Hwang Jeong-ho (황정호)
Suhoji EX (Korean: 수호지 EX, lit. '"Protection EX"')	2005	2005	Art: R.S., Story: Kwon Su-yeong (권수영)
G School (Korean: G 스쿨, romanized: Gi Sukhwul, lit. 'G School')	2005	2005	Art: Kim Byeong-chul (김병철), Story: Son Hang-cho (손창호)
Chronicles of the Cursed Sword (Korean: 파검기, romanized: PaGumKi, lit. 'Wave Sword')	2006	2008	Art: Yeo Beop-ryong (여법룡), Story: Park Hui-jin (박희진)
Yeongung Seogi - Solita ui Baram (Korean: 영웅서기 - 솔티아의 바람, lit. '"Heroic Era - Wind of Solita"')	2006	2006	Yun Won-shik (윤원식)
Pascal (Korean: 파스칼)	2006	2006	Art: Lee Jin-u (이진우), Story: Kye Seung-hui (계승희)
Battle of Decker (Korean: 배틀데커)	2006	2007	Son Tae-gyu (손태규)
Injak (Korean: 인작, romanized: "Is Work")	2007	2008	Art: Lee Jae-heon (이재헌), Story: Hong Ki-u (홍기우)
Surado (Korean: 수라도, lit. '"Possibility"')	2008	2008	Art: Kim Jeong-uk (김정욱), Story: Choe Bo-ha (최보하)
Tyr Jeongi (Korean: 티르전기, lit. 'Tyr Cronicles')	2008	2016	Art: Ra In-soo (나인수), Story: Son Chang-ho (손창호)
Avatar (아바타르)	2009	2012	Art: LEE Hye-young (이혜영)

== Licensed titles ==
As well as there is manhwa in Comic Champ, it also has several manga. Most series come from the Shōnen manga magazines Weekly Shōnen Jump and Weekly Shōnen Sunday, and even two series from the Seinen (adult) magazine Ultra Jump.

=== 1990s ===
Title	Began	Ended	Creator	Origin
Slam Dunk (슬램덩크(SLAM DUNK))	1992	1996	Takehiko Inōe	Weekly Shōnen Jump
Dragon Quest -Dai no Daibōken- (드래곤 퀘스트 타이의 대모험, Thai Dragon Quest Daemoheom)	1994	1997	Art: Riku Sanjo, Story: Kōji Inada	Weekly Shōnen Jump
H2 (H2)	1996	2000	Mitsuru Adachi	Weekly Shōnen Sunday
Ghost Sweeper Mikami: Gokuraku Daisakusen!! (Korean: 고스트 스위퍼, lit. 'Ghost Sweeper')	1997	2000	Takashi Shiina	Weekly Shōnen Sunday
Buzzer Beater (Korean: 버저 비터)	1998	1998	Takehiko Inōe	Web comic/Monthly Shōnen Jump
Cowa! (Korean: 코와! (COWA!))	1998	1998	Akira Toriyama	Weekly Shōnen Jump
Hōshin Engi (Korean: 봉신연의, romanized: Bongsin Yeonui)	1999	2001	Ryu Fujisaki	Weekly Shōnen Jump
Yū-Gi-Ō! (Korean: 유희왕, romanized: Yu-Hui-Wang)	1999	2004	Kazuki Takahashi	Weekly Shōnen Jump
One Piece (원피스)	1999	Present	Eīchiro Oda	Weekly Shōnen Jump

=== 2000s ===
Title	Began	Ended	Creator	Origin
Pokémon Gag Theater (Korean: 포켓몬스터 개그극장, romanized: Pokémon Seuteogeo Geugeukgang)	2000	2000	Kagemaru Himeno	CoroCoro Comic
Chrono Crusade (Korean: 크르노 크루세이드)	2000	2003	Daisuke Moriyama	Comic Dragon, Dragon Age
Bastard!! -Ankoku no Hakai Shin- (바스타드 - 암흑의 파괴신, Bastard - Amheunguipaegoesin, literally - "Bastard - Heavy Metal, Dark Fantasy")	2000	Present	Kazushi Hagiwara	Weekly Shōnen Jump/Ultra Jump
Naruto (나루토)	2000	Present	Masashi Kishimoto	Weekly Shōnen Jump
Tenjō Tenge (천상천하 - 天上天下, Cheonsang Cheonha - Tenjō Tenge)	2000	Present	Oh! great	Ultra Jump
Itsumo Misora (미소라, Misora)	2001	2001	Mitsuru Adachi	Weekly Shōnen Sunday
Keishi Chō 24 Toki (Korean: 경사청 24시, lit. 'Gyeongsacheong City 24')	2001	2004	Hideki Owada	Boys
Katsu! (Korean: 카츠!)	2002	2005	Mitsuru Adachi	Weekly Shōnen Sunday
Eyeshield 21 (Korean: 아이실드21)	2003	Present	Rīchiro Inagaki	Weekly Shōnen Jump
Death Note (Korean: 데스노트(DEATH NOTE))	2004	2006	Art: Tsugumi Ōba, Story: Takeshi Obata	Weekly Shōnen Jump
Cross Game (Korean: 크로스 게임)	2006	Present	Mitsuru Adachi	Weekly Shōnen Sunday
Mirai Nikki (Korean: 미래일기)	2007	Present	Sakae Esuno	Shōnen Ace
Bakuman (Korean: 바쿠만(BAKUMAN))	2008	2012	Art: Tsugumi Ōba, Story: Takeshi Obata	Weekly Shōnen Jump
