= List of magazines in South Korea =

The magazine publishing in Korea emerged as a result of the interactions with Western culture. Early magazines aimed at raising awareness of Koreans. However, later political developments shaped the goals of magazines. Following the partition of South and North Korea the leftist periodicals disappeared in the country. There have been some international magazine titles in South Korea, including Elle which was started in 1992.

The following is an incomplete list of current and defunct magazines published in South Korea.

== 0–9 ==
- 10 Magazine

== A ==
- Allure Korea

== B ==
- Best Eleven
- Booking

== C ==
- Cine21
- Comic Champ
- Cosmopolitan Korea

== D ==
- Donga Science

== E ==
- Elle Korea
- Elle Decor Korea

== G ==
- Global Asia
- The Granite Tower
- Gwangju News
- GQ Korea

== H ==
- Haps Magazine
- Harper's Bazaar Korea
- Hot Music

== I ==
- Indiepost
- Issue

== K ==
- K Scene Magazine
- Koreana

== L ==
- L'Officiel Korea
- L'Officiel Hommes Korea

== M ==
- Monthly Chosun
- Marie Claire Korea

== O ==
- OhmyNews

== S ==
- Sasangye
- Super Champ

== V ==
- Vantage Point: Developments in North Korea
- Visla Magazine
- Vogue Korea

== W ==
- Wink
- Wired Korea
- W
