= Culture of South Korea =

The contemporary culture of South Korea developed from the traditional culture of Korea which was prevalent in the early Korean nomadic tribes. By maintaining thousands of years of ancient Korean culture, with influence from ancient Chinese culture, South Korea split on its own path of cultural development away from North Korean culture since the division of Korea in 1945. The industrialization, urbanization and modernization of South Korea, especially Seoul, have brought many changes to the way Korean people live. Changing economics and lifestyles have led to urbanization—a concentration of population in major cities (and depopulation of the rural countryside), with multi-generational households separating into nuclear family living arrangements. Today, many cultural elements from South Korea, especially popular culture, have spread across the globe and have become some of the most prominent cultural forces in the world.

== Literature ==
Prior to the 20th century, Korean literature was influenced by Classical Chinese literature. Chinese calligraphy was also extensively used by Koreans for over one thousand years in Korean literature. Modern literature is often linked with the development of Hangul, which was created by the fourth king of Joseon Sejong the Great and promulgated in the text Hunminjeongeum. The publication of the Korean alphabet in 1443 was a surprise to many as there are no records of King Sejong working on it, concluding that the king was doing it in secret. This move was initially made to help spread literacy from the dominant scholarly-official class, the yangban, to the common people— including women. Before the creation of Hangul, the common text being read was Hanja, which are Chinese characters; only those from wealthy families who could afford an education were able to learn it. Furthermore, like any other language, Hanja was not able to capture the entire meaning of words that were spoken in Korean, so it was hard to decipher what citizens were attempting to say. Hangul, however, only reached a dominant position in Korean literature in the second half of the 19th century, resulting in a major growth in Korean literature.

In modern poetry, there were attempts at introducing imagist and modern poetry methods particularly in translations of early American moderns such as Ezra Pound and T. S. Eliot in the early 20th century. In the early Republic period, patriotic works were very successful.

Lyric poetry dominated from the 1970s onwards. Poetry is quite popular in contemporary South Korea, both in terms of number of works published and lay writing.

== Journalism ==
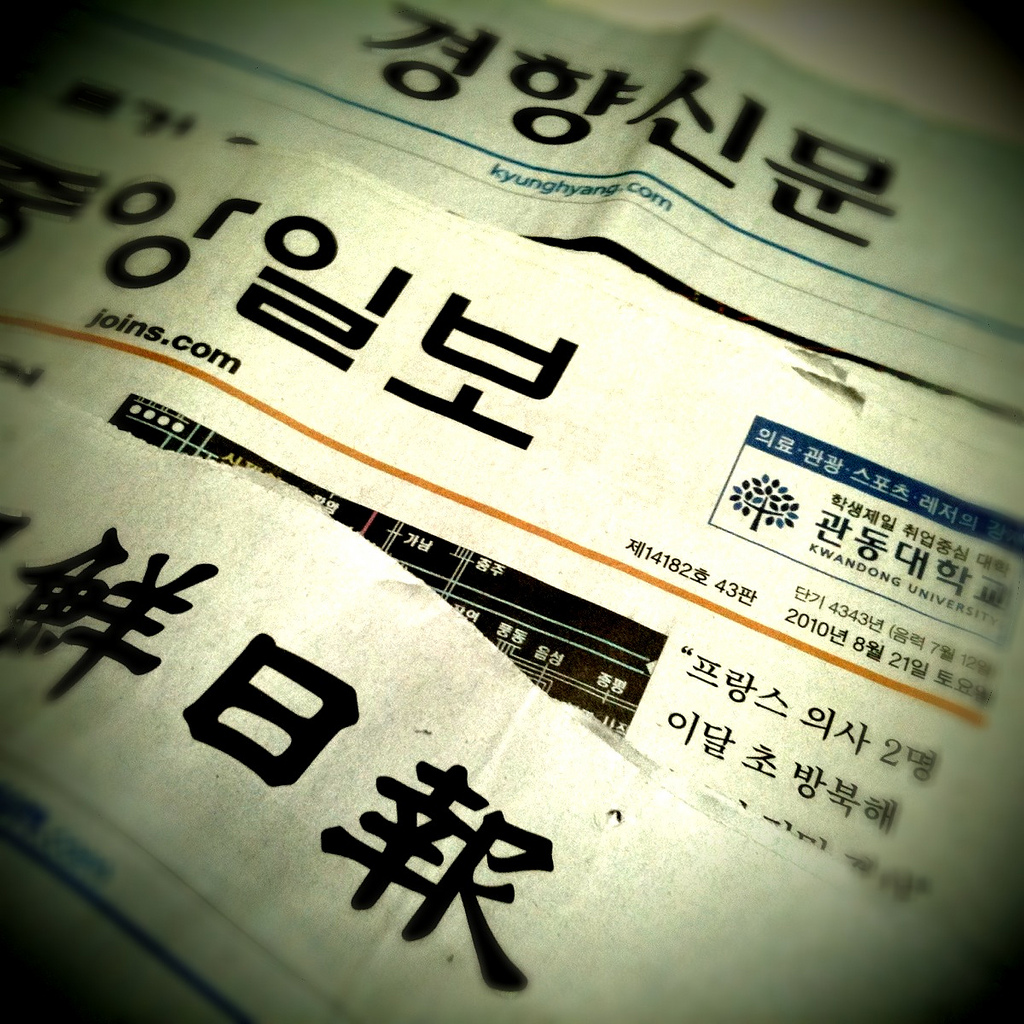
Korean newspapers

South Korea has 10 main newspapers and 4 main broadcasters. Top daily newspapers are The Chosun Ilbo, JoongAng Ilbo, and The Dong-A Ilbo. The Hankyoreh is a left-leaning newspaper. KBS, MBC, SBS, and YTN are the main TV channels, and EBS is used for student and adult education.

Other magazines are K Scene Magazine, JoongAng Ilbo, Yonhap News Agency, and OhmyNews. The Korea Times, The Korea Herald, and PRKorea Times are English language newspapers for foreigners.

== Foreign influences ==
South Korea has for almost a millennium been significantly influenced by China as well as by various neighboring Asian countries to a lesser extent. In recent years, there has been some influence by the Western world, mostly in food. This has changed peoples' eating habits as well; many people now also eat Western and other Asian foods in addition to traditional Korean food. Pizza is one of the favorite foreign foods among South Koreans, though it tends to differ from the pizza served in the west with an Asian tinge, often featuring corn, sweet potato, mayonnaise, bulgogi and various other ingredients. Many hamburger, fried chicken, coffee, and ice cream chains are also very popular in South Korea. While tea remains a highly popular traditional drink, Coffeehouses operated by 12 major brands increased to up to 2,000 locations in 2010, and the term "coffice" (keopiseu 커피스) was coined to describe using a cafe as an office.

Japanese pop culture was banned for decades in South Korea (though not effectively) reaching Korea by way of satellite television channels and youth culture films and magazines. Back in the year 2000, South Korean youth were reading manga, listening to Japanese rock and rap, and fashion in Korea shared similarities with Japanese street fashion trends from Harajuku and Roppongi. The ban on Japanese pop culture imports was lifted in 2000.

== Traditional culture ==
=== Pansori ===
Pansori is a form of traditional musical art within Korea that dates back to the Joseon dynasty (1392–1897), "pan" meaning an open space where individuals come to gather and "sori" meaning sound. Pansori performances consist of a singer and a drummer, the singer sings out the story using special techniques that require years of training, and the drummer producing beats to help the story flow and also to support the singer. Members of the audience are also encouraged to take part in the performance and support the singer.

The purpose of Pansori was to tell tales and stories to individuals who would take the time to listen since most stories range from three hours to eight or nine hours from start to finish. There are five traditional stories that are performed for audiences, but since pansori is mostly orally transmitted, there have been many stories lost throughout history. Each story contains a theme, whether it be about filial piety, love, or the sorrows of individuals releasing their "han". "Han" is an emotion within a person that is negative and usually is tied with grieving, regret, or resentment.

=== Chuseok ===
Chuseok, also known as Hangawi, comes from the agrarian era of Korean society, and is considered one of the biggest holidays for the Korean people. Historians believe Chuseok originated 2000 years ago, and was originally a festival that held a weaving competition. Chuseok is recognized as a public holiday, which allows for work to be suspended until the celebration is over.

The holiday is held on the 15th day of the 8th month of the Lunar calendar. It is a celebration of the Korean peoples' ancestors and is used as a time to give thanks for a good farming season. Chuseok lasts for 3 days, and it is a time spent with family to eat tradition food and play tradition games. Songpyeon is traditionally eaten during this time, and is a rice cake that contains a filling.

=== Seollal ===
Seollal, also known as the Korean New Year, is a holiday that marks the start of a new year on the Lunar calendar. The Korean New Year typically falls sometime in January or February. It is believed that Seollal originates from the 3rd century. Evidence of the first Korean New Year can be found in a document titled Samguk yusa. During the Japanese colonization of Korea, Seollal was prohibited from being celebrated, but then became an official holiday sometime between 1945 and 1950. Seollal is now recognized as a public holiday, and work is suspended until the holiday has ended.

Seollal is a time for family members to honor their ancestors and spend quality time together. Korean ancestors are honored during this time through special rituals, and families get the opportunity to enjoy games and food together. It is very common for Korean people to celebrate Seollal by playing a game of Yut Nori. Tteokguk, or rice cake soup, is typically eaten during Seollal, and it is believed that one will turn a year older after eating the soup.

== Architecture ==
Korean architecture is characterized by naturalistic tendencies, simplicity, and economic feasibility of forms. Sharp angles, strong lines, steep planes, and brilliant colors are all avoided. It typically creates a quiet atmosphere.

== Technology ==
=== Cellular phones ===
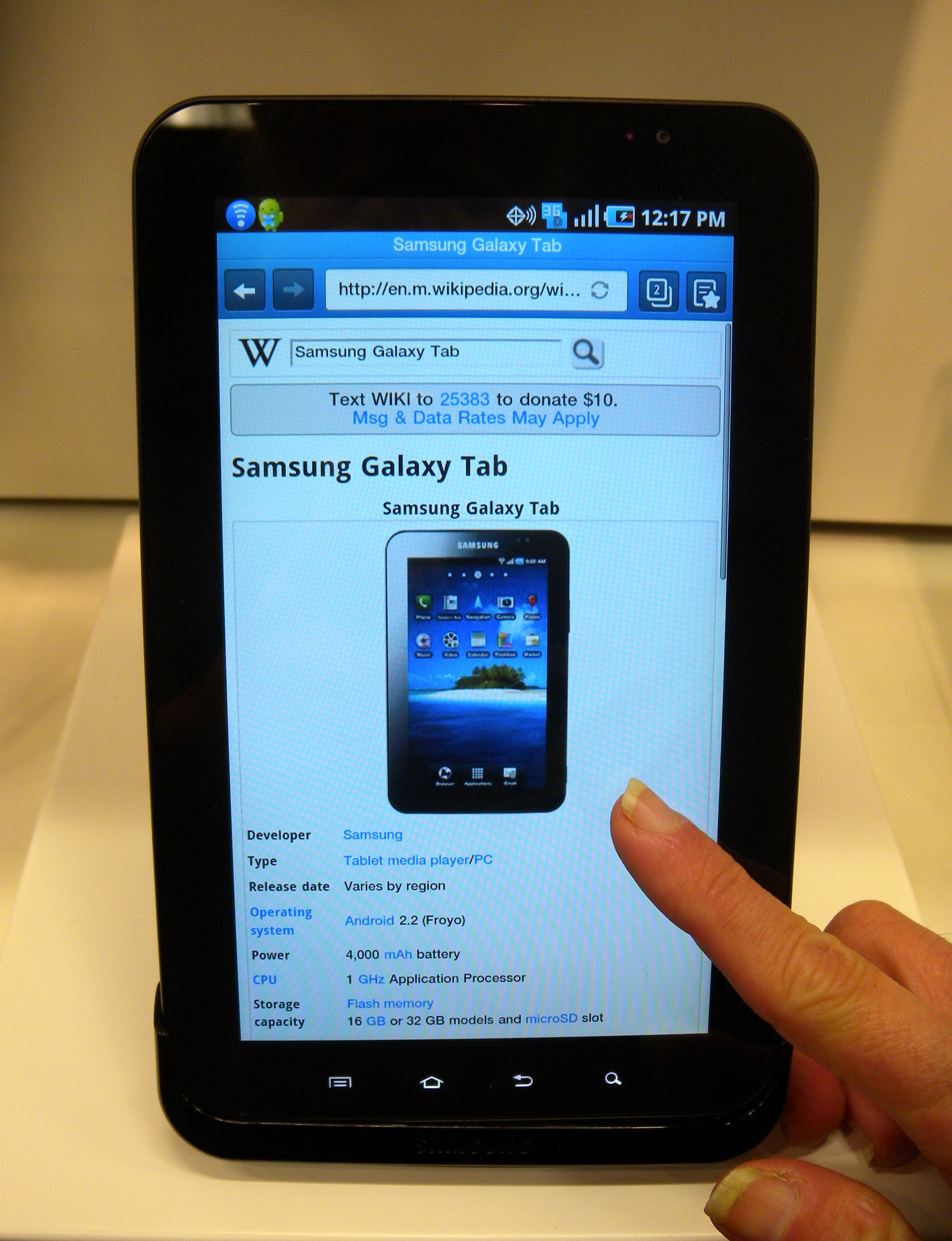
Samsung Galaxy Tab

An estimated 98% of South Koreans own mobile phones and use them not only for calling and messaging but also for watching live TV, viewing websites and keeping track of their online gaming statuses. South Korean corporations include Samsung and LG.

Many South Korean phones feature TV broadcasting through Digital Multimedia Broadcasting (DMB), which now carries seven TV channels. Over one million DMB receivers have been sold, and providers like KT and SK Telecom have provided coverage throughout many parts of major cities.

South Korea won the LG Mobile World Cup, a texting competition run by LG Electronics.

== Video games ==
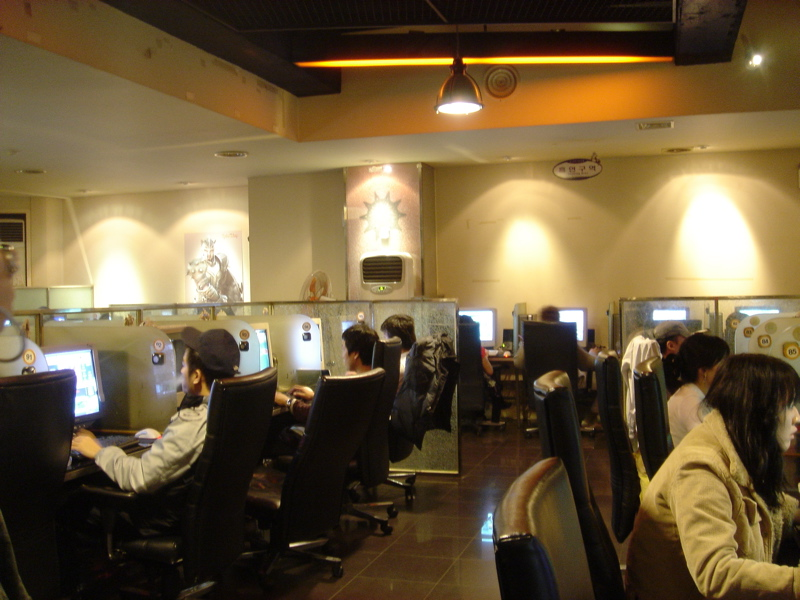
An Internet cafe in Seoul

=== Online games ===
Korea has many e-sports athletes. As perceptions of games have changed, the Korean game market has grown in size and popularized. Korean companies are expected to spur the mobile e-sports industry, or m-sports.

=== History ===
Video games in South Korea have been growing in popularity since the mid-1980s, however it was not until the early 2000s that their popularity skyrocketed. Their sudden growth was due to immensely popular games, such as "Starcraft 2", "League Of Legends", and "Lineage II". Since then, the Gaming industry in South Korea has been steadily growing every year. Its projected market revenue for 2018 is US$10.5 billion.

=== Growth in popularity ===
The introduction of those games in the early 2000s, as well as the introduction of several new international tournaments, like The World Cyber Games, Electronic Sports World Cup, and Major League Gaming, have allowed the video game industry to grow at a much faster rate. In these tournaments, competitive games would be played for large prizes, some being as much as US$1 million. The tournaments are very popular in South Korea, and attract a large viewership. Researchers have estimated that the eSports industry will reach US$1 billion in revenue by 2019.

=== PC bangs ===
Video games are very popular in South Korea, but not everyone is able to afford the gaming PCs necessary to play popular games. These high upfront costs have led to the growth of the "PC bang" industry. Translated as "PC room", PC bangs are public cafés that let customers play popular PC games on powerful, high-end computers at a low cost per hour. There are currently around 25,000 PC bangs in South Korea alone, with hourly rates that ranged from $0.44 to $1.30 per hour in 2007. The success of this low-cost model has led to the rise of PC bangs as a popular hangout spot among students, and they generally serve as a place to meet people with similar gaming interests.

=== Addiction ===
As video gaming is becoming much more popular in South Korea, it also bring up worries of the welfare of the nation's youth. Video game addiction has been a concerning issue with in the South Korean government. Considerable amounts of funds have been invested into programs and campaigns to reduce this issue. One action that the government imposed was the "Shutdown Law". This law prevents anyone aged under 16 from playing online from times 10pm until 6am.

=== Popular media ===
StarCraft, the PC real-time strategy game, was the most popular televised game in Korea. Games are often broadcast on TV stations such as MBCGame and Ongamenet. These tournaments are usually broadcast live and have sizable crowds while they are recorded at shopping malls like COEX, in southeast Seoul. Professional StarCraft players can command considerable salaries in Korea, and are usually noted celebrities, such as Lim "BoxeR" Yo-Hwan. In recent years, professional video gaming in South Korea has branched out away from just Starcraft into a variety of different titles, including Dota 2, League of Legends, Starcraft 2, Battle Ground, and Overwatch.

== South Korean food and food culture ==
Korean food, or hansik, is characterized by a clear distinction between the main dish (rice, noodles, etc.) and the side dish (called banchan), diverse recipes, a balanced mix of animal and plant products, and fermented foods. The Korean people have also believed that food and medicine share the same origin, following the adage that "food is the best medicine."

Fermented foods are the core of Korean cooking. These foods are mostly referred to as "chang". This includes soy sauce (ganjang). soybean paste (doenjang), red chilli soybean paste (gochujang). Green onion, garlic, and red chilli are also the foundations Korean cooking.

Kimchi is one of South Korea's staple foods, normally eaten as a side dish. A meal consisting of steamed rice with one to three side dishes (such as kimchi, more specifically baechan (cabbage)) is common. Kimchi has its own fermented taste not just because of its health functionalities due to its ingredients but also by fermentation products that contribute taste, texture, quality, and health functionality, owing to its special fermentation process.

Sundubu-jjigae is a spicy Korean tofu stew. Unlike typical stews, it is not thick and heavy. It has a deep umami flavor, seasoned with fish sauce, garlic, scallions and mushrooms.

Bibimbap is a rice-based dish with various colorful vegetables and eggs, which are mixed with the addition of gochujang (red chili paste), making its texture very different from what it was in the beginning. Although bibimbap is usually served with meat, many Koreans eat bibimbap with only eggs as the source of protein in the simple rice dish.

Tteokbokki (Korean rice cake dish) is a popular dish (street food) in South Korea. Historically, tteokbokki was considered a refined food that was eaten by nobles and members of the royal court. But in the wake of the Korean War in the 1950s, it transformed into a different kind of dish, made by boiling wheat flour cakes with fish cakes and vegetables in a red pepper sauce mixture. By the 1970s, it had become the people's snack, enjoyed by people from all walks of life.

Budae-jjigae is a popular stew originating from the Korean War. The base is similar to many traditional spicy Korean stews like soondubu or kimchi jjigae, which are usually made of anchovies, seaweed, and gochujang (Korean red pepper paste) steeped together. But its other ingredients set budae jjigae apart from its counterparts. The stew includes spam, baked beans, hotdogs, and ramen noodles with green onions garnished on top.

== Age hierarchy resulting from Japanese colonial rule ==
South Korean society has a custom of age hierarchy, the extent of which is not found in any other country except North Korea. Even Japan, which uses Japanese language, a language with linguistic honorifics developed to the same level as Korean language, is not at the same level as South Korea.

In South Korea, no matter how small the age difference is, if the year of birth is not the same, the hierarchy is determined as Hyeong (형), Oppa (오빠) (both meaning "older brother"), Nuna (누나), Eonni (언니) (both meaning "older sister"), Dongsaeng (동생, meaning "younger brother/sister"), and they are not regarded as mutual friends. (This expression is not limited to relatives in Korea.) Even, if the relationship is not very close, the person who is at least one year younger than the other person must use linguistic honorifics. Therefore, unlike other countries, it is common in South and North Korea to frequently ask people about their age. In countries and regions outside of Korea, it is not common to consider age differences when making friends. This has led to the fact that age reckoning, as used internationally, is not common in South Korean society, and East Asian age reckoning (also known as "Korean age") remains prevalent, unlike neighbouring East Asian countries. This is because in South Korean society, a difference of as little as one year can determine hierarchy.

This custom is often misattributed to Confucian culture. However, during the Joseon dynasty era, age did not carry as much as hierarchical importance as today, and making friends of a slightly different age to oneself was more common.

The origin of this system can be found in the educational system of Japanese colonial rule, more specifically from the Empire of Japan's normal schools (師範学校 shihan gakkou).

The normal schools in the Empire of Japan adopted an educational method that organically combined modern Western-style school education with military-style to create subjects who would voluntarily submit to the Emperor of Japan. It's a structure in which seniors control juniors in a military manner. This system was also introduced to the Korean Peninsula when it was under Japanese colonial rule. The Gyeongseong (Keijō) Normal School (경성사범학교), established on the Korean Peninsula during the Japanese colonial rule, also adopted a disciplinary system in which older students could control younger students and even inflict corporal punishment on them. Korean older students were even allowed to inflict corporal punishment on Japanese younger students. Considering that Koreans suffered oppression and discrimination from the Japanese, the Governor-General of Chōsen, and the Japanese government during the Japanese colonial period, this case demonstrates how powerful the age-based hierarchy was in modern Japanese schools before 1945.

With the defeat of the Empire of Japan in 1945 and the establishment of the US military headquarters (GHQ) in Japan, the disbandment of the Japanese military, and the comprehensive overhaul of the Japanese educational system, hierarchical order in Japanese society weakened, and age-based hierarchy have become mild or disappeared.

This hierarchical system, which was created during the Japanese colonial period and maintained and strengthened by Park Chung-hee, affected not only the age hierarchy but also middle school, high school, university, and work culture. As a representative example, in middle and high schools, there is one thing where students are asked to form a military-style line. When living in society, there are bosses who force military-style language at work. In fact, the South Korean military has already abolished this military-style language.

== Drinking games ==
In the drinking culture of South Korea often with a group of individuals, drinking games are played. These games begin during university orientation and continue to be played throughout life. A variety of games can be played within the group and can change with every coming round. The type of alcohol can vary, but more than likely soju, a common Korean liquor, is used when the games are being played. Sometimes people mix soju and beer and call it "So-Maek," so for soju, and Maek for beer, since beer is called "Maek-joo" in Korean.

== Traditional games ==
Traditional games of Korea include Yut Nori, Tuho, Jegi, and Omok.

== Popular culture ==
=== K-pop music ===
Many Korean pop stars and groups are known throughout East and Southeast Asia. K-pop often features young performers. In the 1970s and 1980s, many musicians appeared, such as Cho Yong Pil, a renowned musician from that period. He used many sources such as the synthesizer. Among his influence, he is well known for popularizing rock music. The popularization of Korean pop music has come from many sources including, YouTube and other video streaming sources. With the growth of social media, it has helped with the expansion of K-pop outside of Asia. The dominant explanation of the global K-pop phenomenon is the "hybrid" view that advances an argument about the combined along with Korean, the Austronesian, Chinese, Japanese, and Indian cultures as a grand Asian Culture (AC) that increasingly countervails the previously dominant Western Culture (WC) as a whole (Chua, 2004). K-pop became one of Korea's top exporting industries with its rapid and widespread popularity around the world, particularly in the East. Korean popular culture has a timely commercial combination of (1) the global liberalization of music markets in Asia and more recently the rest of the world; and (2) the rapid advancement of digital technologies like YouTube which prefers to select and feature perfectly photogenic performers from all over the world, including Korean girl and boy bands (Oh, 391).

The emergence of the group Seo Taiji and Boys in 1992 marked a turning point for Korean popular music by incorporating elements of American popular musical genres of the 1990s. To illustrate, their popularity was based on innovative hybridization of music as they creatively mixed the genres like rap, soul, rock and roll, techno, punk, hardcore and even ppongjjak, and invented a unique musical form which 'employs rap only during the verses, singing choruses in a pop style' with dynamic dance movements. They showed how Korean rap would sound. Consequently, Seo Taiji and Boys expanded the scope of K-pop.

In 2002, BoA became the first Korean pop star to break through in Japan following the fall of barriers that had restricted the import and export of entertainment between the countries since the end of World War II. For that reason, she was awarded the title of Goodwill Ambassador, and has since contributed to restoring the good relations between Japan and South Korea.

In addition, there is also traditional Korean pop music, or trot. Appealing to older Koreans, there are many popular singers, including Tae Jin Ah, Na Hoon-a and Song Dae Kwan, mainly in their 50s and 60s, if not older. However, trot has recently experienced a resurgence due to the popularity of Jang Yoon Jeong, a young semi-trot star, who had a breakout hit with "Omona."

=== Noraebang ===
Karaoke is most commonly called "noraebang" (노래방, literally "song room") in Korea. Noraebang is even conducted in transport vehicles such as tourist buses. Noraebang is the equivalent to the Karaoke-Box in Japan, whereas singing before an audience of a karaoke bar is called Karaoke (가라오케) in Korea. Recently, a coin karaoke, which is a form of payment different from the existing karaoke, appeared.

=== Korean popular culture outside Korea ===
There are approximately 70,000 Korean students in American colleges every year. Furthermore, increased immigration has reached to booming heights of over a million in 2010 alone. With these migrations have come the spread and expansion of Korean Popular culture. For example, the popular South Korean film titled "Shiri" (쉬리) sold more than 5.78 million movie tickets in the United States alone.

One of the reasons for the success of the Korean Wave comes from the influence that the Korean government has in the production and distribution of popular culture. Recent years have led to changes in access to both enjoying and creating new songs, movies, and other types of popular culture. One example comes from recent collaboration with the Korean Government and others to help achieve glocalization, making hallyu approachable and enjoyable for people from many different cultures and backgrounds.

=== Film and television ===
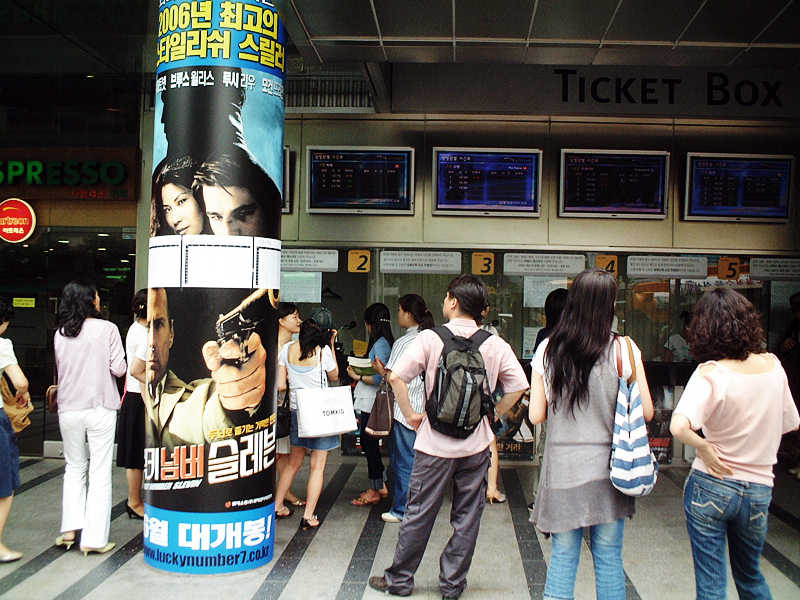
Sinchon movie theatre

The popularity of Korean films has risen since the success of Shiri in 1999. South Korea is one of the few countries where Hollywood productions do not enjoy a dominant share of the domestic market, partly due to screen quotas requiring cinemas to show Korean films at least 73 days a year.

Shiri, a film about a North Korean spy preparing a coup in Seoul, was the first in Korean history to sell more than two million tickets in Seoul alone. It also earned $14 million at the Japanese box office alone, helping it to surpass box office hits such as The Matrix and Star Wars. The success of Shiri motivated other Korean films with larger budgets. Upon release, Shiri attracted 5.8 million theatre-goers; these numbers outscored the local theater attendance for the Hollywood-made film, Titanic. The venture capital firm KDB Capital, the main firm that invested money into the production of Shiri (specifically, around $333,000), would end up earning more than 300 percent in returns (Shim, 33), helping to spark the Korean government's interest in the possible profits that can be awarded through the entertainment industry.

In 2000 Joint Security Area achieved huge success, surpassing the benchmark set by Shiri. The following saw Friend manage the same. In 2001, the romantic comedy My Sassy Girl outsold The Lord of the Rings and Harry Potter which ran at the same time. Park Chan-wook, the director of Joint Security Area, has gone on to direct many popular films in Korea and abroad, and is best known for Oldboy. Kim Ki-Duk, another well-respected filmmaker who is noted for using minimal dialogue to create an emotional response from the audience, is known especially for 3-Iron and Spring, Summer, Fall, Winter... and Spring. As of 2004, new films continue to break records, with many Korean productions achieving greater popularity than Hollywood films. Both Silmido and Taegukgi (The Brotherhood) were watched by over 10 million people, almost a quarter of the Korean population. Silmido is based on a true story about a secret special force, while Taegukgi is a blockbuster about the Korean War from the director of Shiri. The social satire and monster movie The Host (2006) broke Korean box office records and grossed $1.8 million in the United States.

This success attracted the attention of Hollywood. Films such as Shiri are now distributed in the United States. In 2001, Miramax bought the rights to an English-language remake of the successful Korean action comedy movie, My Wife is a Gangster.

Many Korean films also reflect the unique circumstances of the division and reunification of Korea.

In 2016, Train to Busan, directed by Yeon Sang-ho created a new sub division genre of zombie-like film in South Korea. Unlike many more western-made zombie films, Yeon uses an entirely Korean cast to establish and display a Korean-only film. Becoming a Korean zombie blockbuster film, modeled after Shiri(1999), Train to Busan earned a worldwide grossing of US$93.1 million. The film reflects social and economic challenges in a developing South Korean society, creating a realistic perspective of the future.

In 2020, Parasite, directed by Bong Joon-ho, which depicts the economic inequality situation in the country, won four awards at the 92nd Academy Awards: Best Picture, Best Director, Best Original Screenplay, and Best International Feature Film, becoming the first non-English-language film to win the Academy Award for Best Picture. (Note: Although Parasite was the first film with a non-English script to win Best Picture at the Oscars, it is not to be confused with the first foreign film (produced by a company of a country that does not have English as its primary language) to win Best Picture, which was achieved by The Artist in 2012. The French-produced film was largely silent with French intertitles and contained a few spoken lines in English. The Academy dictates foreign language as the main qualification for international film, hence The Artist did not qualify. Further, while prior winners The Last Emperor and Slumdog Millionaire include significant amounts of non-English dialogue, they were considered products of the Hollywood system.)

=== K-dramas ===
Korean television and especially the short form dramatic mini-series colloquially called "dramas" by Koreans and K-dramas elsewhere have become extremely popular outside of Korea. Dramas were foremost among cultural exports trend in Asia and elsewhere. The trend has driven Korean stars to fame and has greatly boosted the image and prestige of Korean popular culture. One example that the Korean Wave of drama have come into existence is in 1997, when the national China Central Television Station (CCTV) aired a Korean television drama, What is Love All About?, turned out to be a big hit. Responding to popular demand, CCTV re-aired the program in 1998 and recorded the second-highest ratings ever in the history of Chinese television. In 1999, in China, another Korean television drama serial Stars in My Heart became a big hit. Since then, Korean television dramas have rapidly taken up airtime on television channels in countries such as Hong Kong, Taiwan, Singapore, Vietnam and Indonesia, which saw media liberalization beginning in the 1990s.

Dramas showcase a wide range of stories, but the most prominent among the export dramas have been romance (All About Eve, Autumn Fairy Tale, Winter Sonata, My Fair Lady, Stairway to Heaven, Full House, My Name is Kim Sam Soon, Goong, My Girl, Boys Over Flowers, Shining Inheritance, You're Beautiful, Heartstrings, Secret Garden, Dream High) and historical fantasy dramas (Dae Jang Geum, Emperor of the Sea, Jumong, Sungkyunkwan Scandal). Korea has also aired their first blockbuster spy drama, IRIS.

=== Korean animation ===
While The Simpsons is the best known back-room product of South Korea, many other popular English-language animation series (Futurama, King of the Hill, Avatar: The Last Airbender, SpongeBob SquarePants, Family Guy) have had the basic animation, in-betweening, and coloring done in South Korea; there has also been some South Korean collaborations and minor contributions on anime from Japan. This work is professional, but not necessarily Korean in tone or manner.

Recently, the animation Pororo the Little Penguin became one of the most popular cultural exports of South Korea, being exported to 120 countries worldwide. It has 1,500 spin-off products and a section in a theme park. Pororo has gained the nickname "Potongryong" ("President Pororo") amongst Korean fans. The brand has generated 389.3 billion won for its creators, Iconix, and according to the Seoul Business Agency, Pororo will generate global sales of 38 billion won (approximately US$36 million) this year) and others.

KPop Demon Hunters is an American animated film set in Korea, released on June 20, 2025. It was directed and conceived by Maggie Kang and Chris Appelhans, and animated by Sony Pictures Imageworks. The film was later released on Netflix and achieved global box office success. Immediately after its release, it entered the Netflix Top 10 in more than 90 countries and ranked No. 1 in several of them.

=== Korean comics or manhwa ===
In Korean, the term manhwa (만화; 漫畫), derived from manhua (simplified Chinese: 漫画; traditional Chinese: 漫畫; pinyin: mànhuà; lit. 'impromptu sketches'), simply means 'comics' but outside the two Korean states, it generally refers to the comics of South Korea, although some comics come from North Korea as well.

=== Webtoons ===
Webtoons are digital comics invented in February 2003 by the website Daum in South Korea. "Love Story" by Kang Full was the first successful webtoon that popularized the industry. Naver founded Line Webtoon in June 2004, and launched their website worldwide on July 2, 2004. Other countries including mainland China, India, Taiwan and Singapore have created their own Webtoon Industries.

== See also ==
- Korean Wave
- Music of South Korea
- Architecture of South Korea
- LG Arts Center
- Hallyuwood
- Tattooing in South Korea
- Pets in South Korea
