= List of King of Hell volumes =

Cover of the first volume of King of Hell, released in the United States by Tokyopop on June 10, 2003

"King of Hell" is a Korean manhwa that is written by Ra In-Soo and illustrated by Kim Jae-Hwan. The story follows the main character, going by the name of Majeh, who is an envoy to the next world for the King of Hell. When evil spirits started escaping into the living world, the King of Hell had Majeh's spirit returned to his body and ordered Majeh to hunt down and capture these escape demons. As the series progresses, Majeh gets acquainted with new and old characters in which some of them joins Majeh on his quest into capturing these escape demons.

In Korea, the manhwa is published by Daewon C.I. The chapters of the "King of Hell" Manhwa have been published in Daewon biweekly magazine called Comic Champ. The first volume of King of Hell was released in Korea on March 1, 2002. In the United States the Manhwa was published by Tokyopop with them releasing the first volume on June 10, 2003. Tokyopop decided not to use the original Korean title, "Majeh" (마제) but instead used the title "King of Hell" for the manhwa. Before Tokyopop shut down their North American publishing facility they've managed to published up to 22 volumes of the series. In the future it's uncertain that the series will be acquired by another English publisher. Daewon currently has published 47 volumes of the series with it still ongoing in Korea.

== Volume List ==
| No. | Original release date | Original ISBN | English release date | English ISBN |
|---|---|---|---|---|
| 1 | March 1, 2002 | 8-95-283866-1 | June 10, 2003 | 1-59182-187-8 |
| 2 | March 1, 2002 | 8-95-283869-6 | August 5, 2003 | 978-1-59182-188-5 |
| 3 | June 1, 2002 | 8-95-284338-X | October 7, 2003 | 978-1-59182-189-2 |
| 4 | August 1, 2002 | 8-95-284705-9 | January 6, 2004 | 1-59182-482-6 |
| 5 | November 1, 2002 | 8-95-284705-9 | April 13, 2004 | 1-59182-483-4 |
| 6 | March 8, 2003 | 8-95-285730-5 | July 13, 2004 | 1-59182-484-2 |
| 7 | June 13, 2003 | 8-95-286111-6 | October 5, 2004 | 1-59182-867-8 |
| 8 | August 15, 2003 | 8-95-286463-8 | January 11, 2005 | 1-59182-914-3 |
| 9 | December 15, 2003 | 8-95-286836-6 | April 12, 2005 | 1-59532-597-2 |
| 10 | March 6, 2004 | 8-95-287351-3 | July 12, 2005 | 1-59532-598-0 |
| 11 | June 10, 2004 | 8-95-287772-1 | November 8, 2005 | 1-59816-059-1 |
| 12 | August 15, 2004 | 8-95-288098-6 | February 7, 2006 | 1-59816-060-5 |
| 13 | October 30, 2004 | 8-95-288473-6 | May 9, 2006 | 1-59816-061-3 |
| 14 | January 15, 2005 | 8-95-288955-X | November 7, 2006 | 1-59816-867-3 |
| 15 | April 30, 2005 | 8-95-289237-2 | February 27, 2007 | 1-59816-868-1 |
| 16 | June 15, 2005 | 8-95-289544-4 | July 3, 2007 | 1-59816-869-X |
| 17 | August 30, 2005 | 8-95-289850-8 | November 13, 2007 | 1-59816-870-3 |
| 18 | October 30, 2005 | 8-95-963142-6 | March 4, 2008 | 1-59816-871-1 |
| 19 | January 30, 2006 | 8-95-963477-8 | June 17, 2008 | 1-59816-872-X |
| 20 | April 30, 2006 | 8-95-963782-3 | September 9, 2008 | 1-42780-135-5 |
| 21 | June 30, 2006 | 8-92-520054-6 | December 2, 2008 | 1-42780-136-3 |
| 22 | September 30, 2006 | 8-92-520395-2 | February 10, 2009 | 1-42781-168-7 |
| 23 | November 30, 2006 | 8-92-520633-1 | — | — |
| 24 | March 12, 2007 | 978-89-252-1069-8 | — | — |
| 25 | June 8, 2007 | 978-89-252-1387-3 | — | — |
| 26 | September 7, 2007 | 978-89-252-1804-5 | — | — |
| 27 | November 12, 2007 | 978-89-252-1955-4 | — | — |
| 28 | February 28, 2008 | 978-89-252-2404-6 | — | — |
| 29 | June 18, 2008 | 978-89-252-2908-9 | — | — |
| 30 | October 20, 2008 | 978-89-252-3492-2 | — | — |
| 31 | February 19, 2009 | 978-89-252-4160-9 | — | — |
| 32 | May 20, 2009 | 978-89-252-4481-5 | — | — |
| 33 | September 11, 2009 | 978-89-252-5012-0 | — | — |
| 34 | December 22, 2009 | 978-89-252-5449-4 | — | — |
| 35 | May 19, 2010 | 978-89-252-6180-5 | — | — |
| 36 | September 15, 2010 | 978-89-252-6745-6 | — | — |
| 37 | February 21, 2011 | 978-89-252-7443-0 | — | — |
| 38 | May 27, 2011 | 978-89-252-7917-6 | — | — |
| 39 | September 9, 2011 | 978-89-252-8628-0 | — | — |
| 40 | November 28, 2011 | 978-89-252-9128-4 | — | — |
| 41 | March 20, 2012 | 978-89-252-9596-1 | — | — |
| 42 | June 18, 2012 | 978-89-672-5059-1 | — | — |
| 43 | September 18, 2012 | 978-89-672-5470-4 | — | — |
| 44 | December 18, 2012 | 978-89-252-1500-6 | — | — |
| 45 | March 20, 2013 | 978-89-682-2137-8 | — | — |
| 46 | June 28, 2013 | 978-89-682-2421-8 | — | — |
| 47 | September 27, 2013 | 978-89-682-2734-9 | — | — |

== Chapters not yet in tankōbon format ==
These chapters have yet to be published in a tankōbon volume. They were originally serialized in biweekly issues of Comic Champ from July 2013 to December 2013.

- 367. "Published in Volume 15: August 1, 2013 issue of Comic Champ magazine"
- 368. "Published in Volume 16: August 15, 2013 issue of Comic Champ magazine"
- 369. "Published in Volume 17: September 1, 2013 issue of Comic Champ magazine"
- 370. "Published in Volume 18: September 15, 2013 issue of Comic Champ magazine"
- 371. "Published in Volume 19: October 1, 2013 issue of Comic Champ magazine"
- 372. "Published in Volume 20: October 15, 2013 issue of Comic Champ magazine"
- 373. "Published in Volume 21: November 1, 2013 issue of Comic Champ magazine"
- 374. "Published in Volume 22: November 15, 2013 issue of Comic Champ magazine"
- 375. "Published in Volume 23: December 1, 2013 issue of Comic Champ magazine"
- 376. "Published in Volume 24: December 15, 2013 issue of Comic Champ magazine"
- 377. "Published in Volume 1: January 1, 2014 issue of Comic Champ magazine"
