= Witch Buster =

South Korean manhwa series

위치헌터 RR: Wichi heonteo MR: Wich'i hŏnt'ŏ
- Genre: Action; Fantasy
- Author: Jung-man Cho
- Publisher: Daewon C.I.
- English publisher: NA: Seven Seas Entertainment
- Magazine: Super Champ (former); Comic Champ (current)
- Original run: 2006 – present
- Collected volumes: 26

Witch Buster (Korean: 위치헌터; lit. 'Witch Hunter') is a South Korean manhwa series written and illustrated by Jung-man Cho. The series began serialization in Daewon C.I.'s magazine Super Champ in February 2006; its serialization was later moved to Comic Champ. As of April 2025, its individual chapters have been collected into 26 volumes.

== Plot ==
Humanity is oppressed by witches who, aided by their loyal supporters, eliminate almost all of the remaining resistance. Cornered, the survivors desperately rally behind fighters with extraordinary powers, the only ones capable of fighting the witches and their demonic servants: the Witch Hunters.

Though ranked among the elite of hunters, Tasha Godspell cannot resign himself to hating these monsters of cruelty, pursuing a goal as dangerous as it is personal. His true desire is only to find the red witch Aria Godspell, his own sister, and bring her back to her senses.

== Production ==
Since the decision of whether a series should be canceled is made after the first volume's release, Cho decided to put as many elements and action scenes as he could into the first volume to try to generate an audience early on. Cho has cited anime from the 1970s and 1980s as a major source of influence on the story.

== Publication ==
Written and illustrated by Jung-man Cho, the series began serialization in Daewon C.I.'s magazine Super Champ in February 2006. Its serialization has since been transferred to Comic Champ. As of October 2023, the series' individual chapters have been collected into 26 volumes.

Seven Seas Entertainment is publishing the series in English in omnibus format. They originally released it under the title Witch Hunter, but had to re-release it as Witch Buster when they learned that another comic had trademarked the Witch Hunter name in the United States.

In 2006, the series was accused of plagiarizing several manga series, such as D.Gray-man. Cho apologized and stated that he would not plagiarize again in the future.

== Reception ==
A columnist from Manga News liked the illustrations, though they also felt the story was unoriginal and too similar to a variety of manga series. Mickaël Géreaume of Planete BD felt the story had a good mix of action and humor. He also liked the main characters and the illustrations.

The series ranked tenth on The New York Times Manga Best Sellers List in 2012 for the week ending June 9.
