= Chronicles of the Cursed Sword =

1998–2008 manhwa series

- Cover of the Tokyopop edition of Chronicles of the Cursed Sword vol. 11 (2005), art by Park Hui-jin

파검기 RR: Pageomgi MR: P'agŏmgi
- Genre: Fantasy, martial arts
- Author: Yeo Beop-ryong
- Illustrator: Park Hui-jin
- Publisher: (South Korea) Daewon C.I.
- English publisher: (Canada) (United States) Tokyopop (Australia) (New Zealand) Madman Entertainment
- Other publishers: (Germany) EMA (Sweden) B. Wahlströms Bokförlag AB
- Magazine: Junior Champ (1999-2006); Comic Champ (2006-2008)
- Original run: 1999–2008
- Collected volumes: 37

Chronicles of the Cursed Sword (Korean: 파검기; lit. 'The Record of the Sword Destroyer') is a Tokyopop-adapted English version of manhwa by Yeo Beop-ryong (author) and Park Hui-jin (illustrator).

PaGumKi was originally serialized in monthly magazine Junior Champ (주니어챔프) from 1999 to 2006, and it is now serialized on monthly magazine Comic Champ (코믹챔프) since 2006. As of June 2007, a total of 31 volumes have been published by Daiwon C.I.

== Summary ==
In the 'Era of the Warring States', Emperor Moosunje has gotten his hands on a powerful sword, known as the PaChun. The PaChun absorbs the blood of humans and gives its wielder amazing power rival only... to the power of its counterpart- the PaSa. The owner of the PaSa, Rey Yan, is the protagonist, unknowingly part of a plot devised by the demonic Prime Minister Shiyan and his brother to overthrow the Demon Emperor, lest Yan becomes the Grand Emperor of Heavenly Destruction. After Emperor Moosunje proves incapable of controlling the PaChun, Prime Minister Shiyan kidnaps Jaryoon, King of Hahyun to receive the sword. Jaryoon, normally a kind and just leader, is transformed into a monster whose mission it is to conquer and 'unite' all the neighboring kingdoms and make Rey Yan suffer.

== Setting ==
The setting includes three fictional "realms".

- Human realm: The realm where all the humans live. It separates the Divine Realm and the Demon Realm and thus has beings from both interacting with humans.
- Divine realm: The realm where all the gods and demi-gods live. In the last 500 years, it was changed from a paradise to a land of blood by the Second Son.
- Demon realm: The realm where all the demons live. A brutal land where only the strongest survive.

== Plot ==
As orphans, Rey and his sister had been living in the streets as young children, and one day decided to go to the palace to meet the emperor, hoping that he would be able to help them. When they arrived, they were each given a sword, and sent into a deep dungeon-like pit where many other orphans were also trapped. The steep walls were unclimbable, and all of the children starved there for several weeks, with only each other and a sword for company. After a long time, the top of the pit slid open, and two large barrels of food were dumped down into the pit. This, of course, was not nearly enough to feed all of the starving children, and they soon realized the truth: They would have to kill each other for the food. Rey's sister was "lost to the darkness", and Rey fell into a deep, exhausted coma, waking to find a demon stone implanted on his forehead because he was one of the strongest who survived.

How he got out and met Shyao is unclear, but they were taken in by a master who taught them of the arts of fighting, magically and physically. However, the powerful demon White Tiger destroyed their master, and Rey vowed revenge. Before dying, their master entrusted the PaSa sword to Rey, telling him to use it wisely. However, as the sword became part of Rey, so did its longings. Thus, in order for the PaSa sword to maintain its tremendous power, it must be constantly fueled by demon blood, thus Rey must continue killing if he hopes to escape the wrath of the heavenly soldiers and sages, and also to protect himself from the PaSa sword's rival and companion, the PaChun sword.

Although Rey's raw power is rather remarkable by human standards, his swordsmanship (and most importantly, learning to merge with the PaSa sword's spirit) leave much to be desired. Master Chen Kaihu takes him in as his disciple (having failed to lure Kuochien away from the ladies long enough). The sword spirit, however, does not find the idea of Rey learning to control his power too exciting as this means he will have a harder time possessing him.

== Volume list ==
No.	Original release date	Original ISBN	English release date	English ISBN
01	1999	—	July 15, 2003	978-1-5918-2254-7
001. "Two Sacred Swords"; 002. "Jaryoon, King of Hahyun"; 003. "The Raid"; 004. "A Common Enemy"; 005. "Soul of the PaSa Sword"
02	2000	—	September 9, 2003	978-1-5918-2255-4
006. "Rey's Madness"; 007. "The Demon Tree"; 008. "A Decoy"; 009. "The Rage of the PaSa Sword"; 010. "Rey's Resolution"
03	2000	—	November 4, 2003	978-1-5918-2256-1
011. "Cruel Memories"; 012. "The Thunder and Lightning Dervishes"; 013. "Rey's Secret"; 014. "A Single Hope"; 015. "The Tansa Monster"
04	2000	—	January 13, 2004	978-1-5918-2421-3
016. "Training Session"; 017. "The Way of Chastity"; 018. "Timura Oshu"; 019. "The Decision"; Cursed Sword Postscript
05	2001	—	March 9, 2004	978-1-5918-2422-0
020. "A New Master for the PaChun Sword"; 021. "Shyao's Resolution"; 022. "The Test"; 023. "Hyacia"
06	2001	—	May 4, 2004	978-1-5918-2423-7
024. "The PaSa Sword Reborn"; 025. "The Armor of Dead Souls"; 026. "Jaryoon's Change of Heart"; 027. "An Achilles' Heel"
07	2001	—	July 6, 2004	978-1-5918-2424-4
028. "Mujin Fortress"; 029. "Lady Sohwa Revealed"; 030. "The Way of the Sword"; 031. "Shyao's Decision"
08	2002	—	September 7, 2004	978-1-5918-2425-1
032. "A Cold Heart"; 033. "Reunited, Only to Part"; 034. "A Divided Soul"; Supplement 1. "Red Moon"; Supplement 2. "Character File"
09	2002	—	November 2, 2004	978-1-5918-2426-8
035. "Mountain of Demons"; 036. "Measure of Despair"; 037. "Visitors From the Demon Realm"
10	2002	—	January 11, 2005	978-1-5953-2387-3
038. "A Decision"; 039. "Lady Shuangpang's Secret"; 040. "A Look Inside"; 041. "Temptation"
11	2002	—	March 8, 2005	978-1-5953-2388-0
042. "Betrayed"; 043. "Reunion"; 044. "The Heavenly Tiger"; 045. "Storming the Fortress of Sorcerers"
12	2003	—	June 7, 2005	978-1-5953-2389-7
046. "The Dreadnoughts"; 047. "Sorcerer Kumwa, the Golden Toad"; 048. "Undead or Alive"; 049. "Hyulgum, Sorcerer of the Sword"; 050. "The Pillar of Enchanted Souls"
13	2003	—	October 11, 2005	978-1-5953-2645-4
051. "The Soul-Scattering Hammer"; 052. "Clash of Sorcerers"; 053. "The Sorcerer King"; 054. "Fistfight"
14	2003	—	January 10, 2006	978-1-5953-2646-1
055. "Spellbound"; 056. "The Escape"; 057. "Obliteration"; 058. "The Return"
15	2003	—	May 9, 2006	978-1-5953-2647-8
059. "Explosion"; 060. "To the Great Azure Pavilion"; 061. "Sages' Defeat"; 062. "Mother?!"
16	2004	—	August 29, 2006	978-1-5953-2648-5
063. "Forbidden Love"; 064. "The Battle for the Great Azure Pavilion"; 065. "Incantation to Dispel Demon Souls"; 066. "The Sages' Last Stand?!"
17	2004	—	January 02, 2007	978-1-5981-6204-2
067. "Destruction of the Great Azure Pavilion"; 068. "The Heavenly Beacon"; 069. "The Sealing of the Divine Realm"; 070. "Hyunbing and Gumno"
18	2004	—	May 01, 2007	978-1-5981-6205-9
071. "Unification"; 072. "The Dog Clan"; 073. "Taorun's Past"; 074. "Off to the Mujin Fortress"
19	2004	—	September 04, 2007	978-1-5981-6206-6
075. "Onward Into Mejin Tower"; 076. "Enter Jukwol"; 077. "Sealing the Heavenly Realm"
20	2005	—	January 01, 2008	978-1-4278-0147-0
078. "Shouren's Past"; 079. "Alliance of the Human and Demon Realms"; 080. "Moving Forward!"
21	2005	—	May 06, 2008	978-1-4278-0148-7
081. "Nymphs"; 082. "Feathers of the Dark Spirit"; 083. "Eyes of Wisdom"
22	2005	—	August 05, 2008	978-1-4278-0149-4
084. "Jade Tower"; 085. "Two Wings"; 086. "Infiltration"; 087. "Ice Arrows"
