= King of Hell (comics) =

South Korean manhwa

- Cover of the Tokyopop edition of King of Hell vol. 1 (2003), art by Kim Jae-hwan

마제 RR: Maje MR: Maje
- Genre: Action/adventure, fantasy
- Author: Ra In-soo
- Illustrator: Kim Jae-hwan
- Publisher: (South Korea) Daiwon C.I. Inc.
- English publisher: (Australia) (New Zealand) Madman Entertainment (Canada) (United States) Tokyopop
- Other publishers: (France) Tokebi (Germany) Tokyopop (Malaysia) Tora Aman (Spain) Ediciones La Cúpula
- Magazine: (South Korea) Comic Champ
- Original run: 2001–2016
- Collected volumes: 47

King of Hell (Korean: 마제; lit. 'Demon Emperor'), also known as Demon King in some countries, is a Korean manhwa written by Ra In-soo and illustrated by Kim Jae-hwan. In the United States, King of Hell was published by Tokyopop.

== Plot ==
King of Hell, Takes place in the past in the Land of Korea and its corresponding realms of afterlife, commonly referred to as the next world or hell in the manga . The story primarily revolves around Majeh, the envoy to the next world, and his existence as a servant to the King of "Hell".

In the beginning the King of Hell focuses on Majeh's work as the envoy for spirits to the next world and his various other roles as the servant for the King of Hell. As the storyline develops, we learn of Majeh's past life in which he was a legendary swordsman and martial artist. Because of his past life, Majeh, upon his death, was sent to a special realm in the next world. This realm, known as "Moorim of the next world," is reserved for great warriors who past lives were deemed to be either evil or to be a great threat to other and possibly a threat to the Kingdom of Hell. Upon His arrival to Moorim, Majeh was challenged by over 50 warrior at once and he easily defeated them without any struggle. Because of this incident, Majeh was considered to be one of the most dangerous people in Moorim and was removed by the King and made envoy to the next world.

=== Beginning of the series ===
Aware of Majeh's incredible power, the council of the Next World declared that he was too dangerous and placed 3 seal's on him, causing Majeh to revert to his teenage form and suppressing the vast majority of his powers. However, even in his teenage form, Majeh is still an incredible martial artists who has no trouble in defeating most of his opponents as well as any martial artists he may come across in the living world. Samhuk, A member of Hell's greatest inspection organization, is observing Majeh's movements as he was ordered to by the King of Hell. Early in the manhwa, Samhuk is caught by Majeh and forced to be his slave or die by his hand. Samhuk, being told of Majeh's power, reluctantly agrees and ends up as a slave and a punching bag for Majeh. It is soon discovered that a rift between the two worlds has opened letting demons crossover and Majeh is ordered to hunt them down.

While on his task to rid the world of the newly freed demons, Majeh is ordered to return to Hell where he learn of a new calamity has occurred and Hell's most wicked Demons, those who resided in Moorim, have escaped into the world of Mortals. However, because the escaped fiends are malignant spirits and evil they must find the body of a recently deceased martial artist to fully utilize their lethal martial arts. Majeh is tasked to arrest these formidable enemies to which He refuses.

The King of Hell, with not other choice, tricks Majeh into going back to his preserved body. Upon his return to the mortal world into his old body, Majeh reverts to his teenage form, due to the sealing spell that was placed on his spirit in the next world. Now back in the mortal world, Majeh has no choice but to complete his task, but is now severely disadvantaged due to his body being that of his teenage years.

=== Martial Arts Tournament Arc ===
Shortly after being returned to his body, Majeh meets Chung Poong, a skilled martial arts disciple who is constantly paralyzed with fear in battle, and Dohwa, a female fighter who specialized in the art of poisonous needles.

Just for fun, Majeh decides to accompany them to a martial arts contest which is for fighters under the age of 15. Dohwa, being older, is unable to participate due to the fact that the contest for martial artists over the age of 15 had already finished its registry a day earlier to their arrival. Majeh, his natural state being suppressed to that of a teenage boy, enters the contest with Chung Poong. Also entering the tournament are five martial arts prodigies.

These martial art prodigies are as follows: Crazy Dog (martial artist, no affiliation), Young (assassin, Mooyoung Moon Sect), Dohak (monk, Sorim sect), Poong Chun (Shaman, Shaman Sect), and Baby (?, Blood Sect). As the tournament progresses, Majeh meets and learns about some of the prodigies and somewhat of their backgrounds. Meanwhile, in the backgrounds of the tournament, it seems that there are people undermining the tournament to ultimately cause a rift between the light and dark sects to put into motion a possible war between the two factions. The tournament itself if being held by one of the light sects and one if it seminaries Mo Young, a good man who believes that there are forces that are trying to start a war in the world but is unsure to what end.

After two day of the tournament, two of the five prodigies, Poong Chun (defeated by Majeh) and Dohak (Defeated by Crazy Dog), and as well as Chung Poong were eliminated from the tournament. The next fights were Majeh versus Crazy Dog, and Young versus Baby. The fight between Young and Baby resulting in Young resigning stating "My senses are telling me it would be a mistake fighting you." The fight between Majeh and Crazy Dog does not finish as the tournament is interrupted by one of the Moorim demons. Crazy dog is killed by the demon when he attacks him for interfering in his and Majeh's fight.

The fight that ensues is the hardest that Majeh has had yet in the Manhwa. And it is soon realized the power gap between Majeh (in his current form) and the Moorim Demon. Mo Young attempts to intervene but is quickly out matched. Samhuk leaves and informs the King of Hell of the situation and the king informs Samhuk that hope is not lost, because as Majeh gets closer to the line between life and death, the special seal that limits his power weakens and Majeh is allowed to return to his adult form. The result is that the Moorim demon is no match for Majeh in his adult form.

=== Missing martial artists ===
After the martial arts tournament, the assassin prodigy, Young, tags along with Majeh to find missing martial artists while Dohwa and Chung Poong go on a side mission to find a magical tablet that will help make them stronger. Majeh and Young uncover the crimes and plans of an old group called the Sa Gok, a group thought to have been wiped out, this group plans to rule the world by eliminating both the White and Dark Sects, they were planning new plots to go on with their task. The Sa Gok had turned the missing martial artists into zombies and would use them to start a Great War between the "good" and "evil" sects in Korea.

Majeh then dragged Young out to Devil Mountain to investigate rumors of a tomb recently found there. This is where the title King of Pa Chun first comes up, a legendary swordsman from 300 years before who rocked the martial arts world. The funny thing is that Majeh happens to know exactly where the King of Pa Chun and his legendary sword was buried and it is not in Devil Mountain. Majeh eventually reveals to all of his fellow treasure hunters, including Chung Poong and Dohwa, that the rumors of a tomb and treasure were an elaborate trap.

Majeh was able to stop the Great War cold then left to continue hunting down the remaining six escaped fiends. The first one he encounters is the old man that interrupts the young dragon tournament. He encounters another fiend while on a side errand for the martial arts leader and helps the monk it was trying to possess destroy the fiend completely. He encounters two more on Raven Ghost Ilse leaving only three (the second one was defeated by the "heaven sage" monk at his death) more for him to find. The only problem is that to get enough power to defeat them he has to die.

== Characters ==
=== Main characters ===
- Majeh (마제)

The main character of the story, Majeh is a very skilled swordsman and an extremely powerful warrior. Majeh is the emissary to the next world and is charged with ferrying souls from the mortal realm to the land of the dead, be that heaven or hell.

Originally, Majeh was fated to go to the Morim, a place where swordsmen of the mortal world who cannot be judged are placed - swordsmen who honed their skills through unorthodox means. Once a swordsman reaches the pinnacle of their art, they can no longer be judged and are placed in the Morim. When word of Majeh's arrival reached the other residents of the Morim, they targeted him. However, Majeh dispatched every resident, except for one, of the Morim that challenged him that day. He was finally challenged by Murin himself, and an epic battle ensured, where both fighters used Heven Slayer Ki, each believing themselves to be the only possessor of such ability. Murin quickly defeated Majeh. Before Murin could kill Majeh, the King of Hell swoops in and ends the fight, and majeh becomes his envoy, as to keep Majeh and Murin apart. As such, the King of Hell deemed him as threat to the Kingdom of Hell and Majeh was made the ferryman of souls between the mortal world and land of the dead ever since.

Majeh bears the Mark of the Super Human Seling bol, a strength sealing gold mark which seals away a great deal of Majeh's incredible power and changes him back into a young boy. The method to outright remove the seal is for Majeh to die; thus, the closer Majeh comes to death, the weaker the seal becomes.

When evil spirits started escaping into the mortal world, the King of Hell had Majeh hunt them down. However, during the confusion, the seven strongest members of the Moorim escaped to the real world and so the King of Hell returned Majeh to life to hunt them down. During his travels Majeh became entangled in a second plot to overthrow the martial arts world masterminded by a long thought dead enemy known as the Sa Gok.

After beating the Sa Gok, Majeh loses his memories and becomes a courier called Yong. He works as a protector for the courier goods. He is later found by Samhuk whom majeh can no longer sense or can no longer recognise. Samhuk sends Majeh off to speak to the trade demon. He encounters her, and after trying to exchange his soul for his memories, but as Majeh's soul is owned by the king of hell, she can not possess it, and thus hires men to kill majeh, when he is in a dream, gain his past memories.

As Majeh regains his memories and awakens, he encounters Chung Poong, Dohwa and young all protecting his unconscious body. He kills the trade demon easily, and then beings to hunt down the remaining demons. Little does he know that Murin, the strongest fights from the Murim level of hell, has escaped, and is hunting down artifacts to make him the strongest. He is posing as a reincarnation of the Dalai Lama.

Joined in his travels by novice martial artists Chung Poong, Dohwa Baik Majeh, and later Young a prodigy of the Mooyoung Moon martial artists. Majeh hopes to stop the Sa Gok, and defeat the escaped souls of the Moorim.

- Samhuk

Part of Hell’s Inspection Organization, Samhuk is a ninja spy who was sent by the King of Hell to watch over Majeh’s activities while in the mortal world. When Majeh discovered that Samhuk was spying on him, Majeh forced him to become his servant doing whatever Majeh orders him to do.

- Chung Poong Namgoong

A young man from a well-respected family he first meets Majeh in a forest when he tried to rob him of all of his belongings. After their confrontation Chung Poong explains to Majeh that back where he lived he was branded as a coward and ran away from home to attend the martial arts tournament to show his family and his village that he's not a coward. He then joined Majeh and participated in the Martial Arts Tournament in Nakyang. Mostly in the beginning of the series Chung Poong fights his opponents while being blinded with fear. After he survived the brutal tasks at the Seuk Sang cave he becoming less of a coward and more of a fighter.

- Dohwa Baik (도화)

Having the same first name as Majeh’s love, Dohwa Baik is a vibrant vixen that specializes in fighting with poison needles. When Dohwa is around Majeh and Chung Poong she acts more like an older sister and an adult figure to them. After the tournament in Nakyang, Dohwa and Chung Poong went to the Seuk Sang cave to get stronger and to gain better fighting abilities so they can aid Majeh when they have to face stronger opponents. Later in the manhwa Dohwa returned to her clan and came into possession of a powerful and evil whip called the Mapyun. Due to the whips demonic power only few that are strong enough can weld it. Those that are unable to control the whip get possessed by it and go on a killing spree. Dohwa found the strength needed to subdue the whips evil power and took control over it.

- Cerberus (켈베로스)

A three Headed Dog that is the protector to the gates of the next world. He doesn’t have a major role in the beginning of the series until later on when the King of Hell ordered him to go to the mortal world and help Majeh sniff out and capture the rest of the escape demons. Later on in the manhwa we learn that Cerberus himself is also a demon when he had to transform back to his original form to defeat his enemy on Raven Ghost Isle. Majeh claimed that when Cerberus is in his original form it would be difficult for him, even without the Superhuman Strength Sealing Symbol restraining his powers, to defeat Cerberus in that form.

=== Child prodigies ===
- Young (젊은)

A child prodigy from the Mooyoung Moon Clan, Young is a skilled assassin and powerful swordsman. After seeing what happen at the martial arts tournament he was curious about Majeh’s abilities and joins Majeh’s on his quest in hunting down the escape demons. Young possesses some great abilities that includes the Full Explosion Force and his special move called the Choo Sal Sword Technique.

- Crazy Dog (미친 개)

At the age of six, Crazy Dog is the youngest out of the five child prodigies that attended the Martial Arts Tournament. When going against enemies his main weapon he uses in combat is his club that he carries around with him. After the incident at the martial arts tournament Crazy Dogs body was taken and tested on to see if his body was capable of withstanding the Hyur Jung, a magic charm made from a monsters blood when fully bonded with a subject turns him into a demon. At the battle of the white and black sects, Majeh unknowingly broke part of the charm, which if not broken would’ve later changed Crazy Dog into a true demon. He later recovers physically, but regresses mentally towards what would be normal for a child of his age. Crazy Dog begins to treat Majeh as an older brother when they meet again at Moorim Headquarters. He joins Majeh and company on their trip to the Gobi Desert.

- Baby (아기)

Baby is one of the five child prodigies that attended the Martial Arts Tournament. Baby is affiliated with the Blood Sect, a group of fighters that masters the art of the Snake Hand Technique. He is the only character seen in the manhwa that has multiple personality’s residing within him. The personality of Baby is a kind hearted character that only cares for others and is not much of a fighter as his two counterparts are. When Baby is in danger or becomes injured Hyur come out in Baby’s place and handles all the dirty work. Hyur is more of an experienced fighter than Baby and doesn’t hesitate in killing his enemy’s when needed. Later in the manhwa another personality named Kwang is mentioned that comes out less often as the others do. Kwang is the strongest of the three personalities and only appears when Hyur gets into a situation or a fight that he has no chance of coming out alive.

- Dohak

A 15-year-old monk and a master at fighting with a rod, he is from the Sorim Temple in the Soong mountains.

- Poong Chun

A 12-year-old expert with the broad-sword. He is affiliated with the Shaman Sect.

== Volumes ==
Each volume includes new and old faces from the previous volumes. However, many of the characters introduced are never seen in the subsequent later volumes as they are killed off are never mentioned again. Majeh, the main character opts to travel with two specific people beginning in the timeline of volume 3 in which he meets the coward Chung Poong Namgoong and the femme fatale Dohwa Baik. As the manhwa progresses, other characters such as Young, Crazy Dog, Cerberus and occasionally Baby, are often seen accompanying Majeh on his journey.

There are currently 47 volumes available from Champ Comics in Korea. Before Tokyopop shut down their North American publishing facility, they had published up to 22 volumes of the series. It is currently unknown if the series will be picked up by another English-language publisher.
