= PhD: Phantasy Degree =

South Korean manhwa series

- Cover of the Tokyopop edition of PhD: Phantasy Degree vol. 1 (2005), art by Son Hee-joon

마스터스쿨 올림프스 RR: Maseuteo seukul Ollimpeuseu MR: Masŭt'ŏ sŭk'ul Ollimp'ŭsŭ
- Genre: Comic fantasy
- Author: Son Hee-joon
- Publisher: (South Korea) Daiwon C.I.
- English publisher: (Australia) (New Zealand) Madman Entertainment (Canada) (United States) Tokyopop
- Magazine: (South Korea) Comic Champ
- Original run: 2001 – Present
- Collected volumes: 10 – hiatus

PhD: Phantasy Degree (Korean: 마스터스쿨 올림프스; lit. 'Master School Olympus') is a manhwa series created by Son Hee-joon. The series is published by in English by Tokyopop. There are currently 10 volumes published, and the series' original publisher, Daiwon C.I. lists it as ongoing, but no new volumes have been published since 2005. A one-volume prequel to the series entitled Magic Academy Zeus (매직 아카데미 제우스, Maejig Akademi Jeusu) was published in South Korea in 1998. The story follows a young girl named Sang who is searching for the Demon School Hades.

== Story ==
A young, spunky, fearless girl named Sang is searching for the Demon School Hades. She runs into a group of misfit monsters who are all ditching classes from the same school. Sang convinces them to take her to the school ... and, since only monsters are allowed in, she 'monsterizes' herself by letting one of the misfits – a vampire – bite her. After the destruction of the Demon School Hades at the hands of the Madosa Guild in volume 3, she moves on to search for more of "Satan's Rings". She meets Chun-Lang, a young swordsman, who also has a Ring, and like Sang, can change genders. During a confrontation against Alcan, one of the Madosa Guild, Sang loses her memory. She is nicknamed Limbo by everyone now surrounding her.

== Characters ==
Sang

A human girl searching for something at the Demon school Hades—ultimately to find a mysterious ring. She has amazing leaping abilities, and she is a master of escape. Later we learn that Sang already has a few rings on her fingers, but instead of giving her power they seem to act like limiters for her and each time she takes one off, she ends up with a different personality and different abilities and skills. She has four different personalities, her first personality is the one she uses most often. She seems to have a few magical abilities and a strange personality. Her second personality is an older woman who seems to be more powerful, the third is a half crazy man with a lot of fire power. The last is a subtle man who seems to use more quiet magics like telekinetic powers and tiny marble like energy spheres. They are all wizards and are fully aware of each other. Despite being turned into a vampire by Mordicus in Volume 1, she appears human in later volumes. She even loses her fangs.

Chun-Lang

A very hungry swordmaster that Sang meets in the woods. She possesses The Ring of Life which is what allows her to maintain her feminine form – her true form is a younger male, though for the most part she remains as a female. Chun-Lang is one of the stronger characters in PhD, especially after taking the Final Exam at the Master Tower and being able to revert to her original form as a man. In a mental world the female Chun-Lang told the original that their gender did not determine their strength, merely how each of them used it as the original – male – Chun-Lang was bested by the "weaker" female Chun-Lang when in a duel. Chun-Lang also has a deep hatred for the Madosa Guild, rivaled perhaps only by that of Noel's.

Dev

A teenage demon out for revenge on the one who killed his brother – Henduh. He has a thing for Norta but she is engaged to a Demon even more powerful than his brother, Fatalis. After taking the Final Exam Dev becomes stronger, though never gets the chance to show his skills. He seems to trust Sang the most out of all the characters, as her actions has saved all of their lives despite appearances. He defends her when she is attacked by Chun-Lang.

Notra

A Succubus of royalty. (They refer to her as Lady Notra.) Notra seems attracted to Dev, but she also enjoys tormenting him. Despite her feelings for Dev, she is engaged to a white winged demon that Noel and her mother summons.

Katana

A powerful demon, head of the demon bullies. Katana's whereabouts remain unknown after Norta, Dev and him left the demon school, Hades, but was seen as a guard for Lord Gandara at the end of book 10

Professor Shimuro

The leader of Elftown and the father of Oedipus and Iris. During the attack on Elftown by Henduh, Shimuro confronts him and allows the other to escape. At first he seems to have the upper hand but he is eventually overwhelmed by Henduh's strength and is killed by him.

Hexion

A peace-keeping elf known for making rash decisions. Hexion's hearing is exceptional, even by elf standards. Unknown to many, Hexion lived life as a male, but was revealed to be a girl by Henduh during the invasion of the elf village. During this time she declared she would rather die then allow others to know her secret. She shows her affections for Oedipus by kissing him before she has the survivors leave her for what could be her death match with Henduh. Hexion later returns in the same way Dev's friends did due to drinking Sang's blood. (Hexion sucks Sang's snakebite believed to be poisonous.) Her weapon of choice are arrows, which are made from her hair. She is defeated by Stonia but saved in the end by Iris. Her unconscious body is dragged away from the battle by a crying Iris who are both saved by Chan Chun.

Oedipus

A young elf with little battle training, but a ready mind and a steady heart. It was implied that he may have a crush on Sang, whom he knew as Limbo at the time, however, Hexion kissing him puts that into question. He dies protecting his younger sister, Iris.

Iris

Younger sister of Oedipus. Friends with a troll named Bob. She is stubborn and hates being treated so lightly. She is one of the rare elves that can form arrows from magic energy. During her brother's death, she begs him not to die promising to address him by "Big Brother." She survives along with Hexion and is eventually saved by Chan Chun.

Yong-Ha

A swordmaster who was a student at the Athena Academy. She along with her fellow students were captured by ogres and imprisoned. They eventually escaped and were instructed to enter the master tower after the Madosa Guild had attacked the Athena Academy. She along with her friends entered and were able to unlock their true potential by undergoing the test inside the tower. She and Gyo-Hwe are able to defeat Stonia and she later fights Dustis only to be stabbed though the chest with her own sword. She appeared in one of the visions of the future that Chang Chun experienced along with Gyo-Hwe.

Gyo-Hwe

A fighter who was a student at the Athena Academy. She was among the students that were captured by the ogres and later takes the test at the master tower. She and Yong-Ha are able to defeat Stonia together but she later is killed by Cider along with her friends. She and Yong-Ha appeared in one of the visions that Chang Chun saw.

Eun-Kyul

A thief who was a student at the Athena Academy. She along and her friends were captured by ogres before the attack on Athena Academy by the Madosa Guild. After taking the test with her friends she gains new powers. At first she states that she is a thief but after the test it is revealed that she is actually a tamer who is able to draw out the latent powers of animals. She fights Madosa Guild member Dagger with Carbuncle and is later killed by him.

Carbuncle

Carbuncle is small creature who has a small jewel on his forehead. He is left behind after the Athena students were captured by ogres. His true name isn't Carbuncle but Eun-Kyul named him that and it eventually sticks. He is later renamed Cappa by Sang and she becomes agitated whenever somebody calls him anything else. He enters the master tower along with the Athena Students and changes form into a wolf like creature afterwards. It is revealed that he is actually of a legendary species who possesses supernatural powers. He is able to access these powers when his master, Eun-Kyul, orders him to fight. He then takes on the appearance of a beastly man. Despite his new powers, he is killed by Dagger along with the rest of the Athena students. He later appears at the end of volume 10 in the vision that Chang Chun saw.

Noel

A bumbling magician who was a student at the Athena Academy. She and her friends are captured by ogres and imprisoned before the invasion at the academy. She is the only one of the Athena students who did not leave the tower to face the Madosa Guild and thus is the only one of them to survive. She constantly makes mistakes when casting spells, destroying the floor beneath her when she attempts to attack and summoning a salamander when she originally intended a fireball spell. It is later revealed that her mother was killed by the Madosa Guild, because of this she wants to avenge her mother's death much like Chun-Lang and Dev. Before her mother died she makes a contract with the white winged demon to protect her daughter. Noel is unable to summon the demon until she learns of her friends deaths. She is so enraged that she calls out the demon. The demon helps her and Notra escape from the Madosa Guild making her the only survivor among the Athena students.

Bomi

A greedy priestess who was a student at the Athena Academy. She and her friends were captured by ogres and imprisoned before that attack at Athena. Her teacher instructs her and the other students to go to the master tower and undertake the test. After taking the test she gains much more powers and is able to heal even fatal wounds. She often charges people money for information or to help them in fights, even in life or death situations. After witnessing all of her friends die she is forced by the Madosa Guild to break open the doors of the master tower. The task takes a major toll on her body. She is fatally injured and is left with very little time left to live. Before she dies she is confronted by Chang Chun and he questions her about what happened. Before her death he states that there is still something that she can do, although it is never revealed what that was.

Doe Sangun

A teacher at the Athena Academy who takes the Ring of Life from Chun Lang. He is apparently male but has only been shown as a woman so far. Although a man shown in a flashback in volume ten had similar weapons to him. He is first seen watching Sang and Hexion enter the ogre's fortress and later helps the students escape. When returning to the school he orders the students to head towards the master tower and take the final test. He then goes on to fight Stonia but is later killed by her.

Cho-Hyun

A teacher at the now destroyed Zeus Academy who had the Ring of Life before Chun Lang. He is now training one of the survivors of the Zeus Magic Academy named Noru. He is a Martial Arts Master who lost his arm to Stonia at the destruction of Zeus.

Noru

He is a Martial Artist and one of the four student survivors of Zeus along with Sitan, Gong-Ji and Ryushi.

Gong-Ji

He is the Healer of the group and knows only elementary magic skills. He also seems to be a monk of some kind. He is quiet and shy.

Sitan

He is a fighter who wields a saber. Among the four, group, he seems to be closest to Sang, whom they also known as Limbo.

Ryushi

He is the mage of the group and fights using Magic Missiles. He is serious and gathers information during their quests.

Pannus Tyrannus

A mummy who went to school at Hades and was friends with Dev, Mordicus, and Lukan. In Volume 1, Sang pointed out that he was not very frightening. In Volume 2, he became more powerful because he consumed Sang's blood, and it was indicated that he was once a pharaoh. While his death was not shown clearly in Volume 2, his shoes can be seen lying on the floor in front of Lance on page 126 of volume 2, but because Dev is shown at his grave in Volume 3, it makes it more clear.

Mordicus

A vampire who went to school at Hades and was friends with Dev, Lukan, and Pannus Tyrannus. In Volume 1 Sang pointed out that he was not very dangerous. In Volume 2, he became more powerful because he consumed Sang's blood, and it was indicated that he was one of the "Blood Emperors". While his death was not shown clearly in Volume 2, he was shown seemingly dead on page 134 of volume 2, but because Dev is shown at his grave in Volume 3, it makes it more clear.

Lukan

A werewolf who went to school at Hades and was friends with Dev, Mordicus, and Pannus Tyrannus. In Volume 1, Sang pointed out that he was "about as dangerous as a squirrel." In Volume 2, he became more powerful because he consumed Sang's blood, and he described himself as :the King of Beasts". While his death was not shown in Volume 2, although he was seen fighting alongside Tyrannus in volume 2 and you then see only Tyrannus's shoes only on page 126, it was indicated that he died in that volume, because Dev is shown at his grave in Volume 3, it makes it more clear. However, he does appear in one of the visions that Chang Chun saw.

=== Madosa Guild ===
The Madosa Guild is an organization in PhD whose goals have yet to be revealed. They are a group of humans with amazing fighting abilities. They are identified by a tattoo somewhere on their body. The top ten members of the organization are known as the Order of Rank and are identified by a number placed in the center of their tattoo. Their goals are unknown at this point in the series but they are responsible for the destruction of the Zeus, Athena, and Hades Academies. They also appear to be tracking down others who possess great power like themselves. The reason for this is never specified but it is most likely that they are either tying to obtain new members or eliminate potential threats. Because of this, they have made many enemies most of whom were either friends or family of those that they have killed. The older members of the guild treat Sang with respect and order the newer members to not fight her even though she poses a threat to their goals. Whatever connection Sang has to them is still unknown as of now(In volume 9 it is said that she helped found the guild). Despite sustaining great injuries on many occasions, only one member of the Guild has been killed so far.

Chang Chun

He is the leader of the Madosa Guild and he also appears to have some type of connection to Sang. When he first he confronts the members of the Guild who have attacked Athena and it appears that he has come to stop them. The ranked members don't seem to know who he is even though they note that he has a similar aura as their Leader and that he has the same name. He doesn't appear to know that he is the leader of the guild. One possibility is that he has multiple personalities like Sang does. He does not actually help fight any of the members but instead helps Chun Lang, Dev, Iris, and Hexion escape. It also seems that Noel's mother knew him at one point in time. After helping them escape he is confronted by Hwee-Young and the assassin who looks like Chun Lang. They have him put on two of Satan's rings and another personality takes over him. This personality seems to be the true leader of the guild.

=== Order of Rank ===
These are the top-ranked members in the Guild. Each Order member possesses superior combat ability and is assigned a number from 1 to 10 that indicates their rank and relative power level, which is shown somewhere on their body (Hendu's is on his tongue, for instance). The Order consists of ten members and the tenth member has yet to be shown, though most fan theories suggest Gelpa.

Lance – Order of Rank #1

He is the head of the Order of Rank and bears the number I on the tattoo on his forehead. Despite his obvious military and personal power he takes little part in the fighting himself, though the one time he does it seems the fight is over quickly. Quite clearly he is the strongest of them all as the 7th of the Order suggested that only Henduh was capable of breaking into The Master Tower, a feat Lance accomplished just as easily. It would seem that in the absence of President Hyup he has been the stand-in leader of the Madosa Guild given his status as the strongest of the Order. However, he appears to show a good amount of loyalty to Sang rather than Chang Chun.

Spear – Order of Rank #2

According to Stonia this member is a woman with unknowable strength who is quietly spoken and generally wears her hood up to conceal most of her features. From the brief time she has her hood down it looks as though she might be blind as there are never any pupils shown in her eyes whether hooded or unhooded – her tattoo is on her forehead, same as Lance. She is also quite intelligent, knowing enough about magic to guess Noel was better suited for summoning, able to dispel a Contract between a summoner and a Demon. Spear is a stark contrast to many other Order members in that she actually assesses a situation first and isn't obscenely arrogant.

Henduh Khyung – Order of Rank #3

A malicious individual with strong powers, he is marked with the number III on his tongue. His powers are immense (though he still takes orders from Lance) his endurance is incredible, enough to withstand everything thrown his way. His Holy Breath is a massively powerful breath blast attack and Henduh comments that he leaves nothing alive wherever he goes. Much later he destroys the Elven village where he also kills Master Shumiro and defeats Hexion and Bob, proving his might even as he battles multiple foes. It was stated only Henduh could break The Master Tower (Lance too accomplished this though) and he is arrogant to the core alongside his bloodthirsty nature, though despite this he is no fool as he refused to rush Professor Shumiro head on and "create an opening" for him. Even though he states that the entire UnderWorld could come scampering out to fight for all he cared.

Cider – Order of Rank #4

His powers enable him to change his fingers/hands and perhaps his whole arms into tentacles appendages for use in combat. Like Henduh he seems to have shown little pressure in combat as yet, often remaining calm to Henduh's rage and finds it ironic that Henduh could be laid low by mere children. He possesses the number IV on his forehead and when engaging Sang due to his rage he undergoes an as-yet-unseen 'mutation' that leaves his coat damaged and his body massed with tentacles. He is more together than most others in the Order...except when pushed to lose his temper at which point he becomes quite aggressive and snappish when he is usually the analysis-type.

Dustis – Order of Rank #5

She possesses the number V on the back of her collar though her tattoo is unseen as yet. She carries a staff that ends in a shape like a musical note, indicating the bulk of her talents – sound (though she also changes a sword into a snake on one occasion). Dustis is still quite young by remarks from Spear and seems it both in actions and mannerisms since she is more easily tricked than Spear or Cider which Spear puts down to her being young/less experienced. Dustis seems to be in a 'relationship' with Dagger since a joke is made of it on more than one occasion by Dagger, especially that Dustis has no holds on him because they aren't married. Whilst Dustis seems to care for Dagger, Dagger doesn't seem to feel the same way and calls her a 'psycho'.

Stonia – Order of Rank #6

A member of the Madosa Guild who seems to have a grudge against Chun-Lang. Also appears to be on good terms with Henduh to the point they may actually be friends. She easily defeats Chun-Lang in battle, breaking her right arm, all her right fingers and her right leg just for kicks and is probably the Order member about whom we see the most ability. Her powers stem from control over gravity and her number VI is on her forehead, usually covered by her headpiece and whilst she is a capable fighter she is also quite sadistic. She gets on well with Henduh presumably because she has curves aplenty which Henduh notes to Lance is one thing he does like...along with any woman with curves.

Name Unknown – Order of Rank #7

Currently nothing is known about this member. He is shown wearing full armor and is very large in comparison to the others as well as traveling alongside Lance and participating in the death of Noels mother. Despite being ranked lower than most of the others he seems to be on friendly terms with Spear and even Dustis since even when he lightly told the latter off she did not bite back as she would with Dagger.

Alcan – Order of Rank #8 (Deceased)

A necromancer with the number VIII on the top left side of his forehead, who was fooling around in the woods trying to recreate Gigantes...until Chun-Lang came along and ended up creating the beast and falling into the role of playing its 'Mommy'. Alcan is quite strong for his rank but nonetheless is killed by the mysterious woman who looks like Chun-Lang. For him death was not the end and he returned as a Liche only to be destroyed by Professor Shumiro once and for all. Alcan was reasonably powerful but it seems his skills lean less towards combative ability than the other Order members thus far.

Dagger – Order of Rank #9

A young member of the Madosa Guild who bears the number IX on the back of his right hand. He is seen to plant seeds inside his opponents and make them bloom into evil plants, ripping them up and turning them into drones for him to control easily. When he enters Combat Mode his power seemingly increases and he gains the ability to change at least his right arm into a sword or a kind of shield, though he also uses a sickle blade from his forearm. Dagger has a love/hate relationship with Dustis – she loves him, he kind of just goes along with it, though it is clear Dustis does all the chasing and Dagger does all the running. He's younger than most others and asks the most questions, mostly from inexperience and can be a bit too cocky when in combat which may lead to him being surprised. His personality changes drastically when in 'combat' mode, as he is louder, more talkative, foul mouthed and mischievous, whilst his normal persona is still rather sarcastic, sadistic but quieter and speaks in a more polite tone.

Name Unknown – Order of Rank #10

Currently nothing is known about this member, we only know they exist because Stonia says that there are ten members of the Order of Rank. This member was not present during the attack at the Athena Academy or when the guild reached Olympus, even though it was stated several times that the entire Order of Rank was present at the time. One possibility is like Alcan, this member has been killed prior to the beginning of the series and has yet to be replaced.

=== Other Members ===
Besides the Order of Rank, there are many other members of the Madosa Guild who are unranked. These individuals also possess great skills and usually will accompany the ranked members on missions.

Mahalisa

A member of the Madosa Guild who accompanied Henduh during the attack on Hades Academy. She is able to manipulate the wind and easily defeated some of the Hades students. Her mission was to seal the gates to the Mahagae which is basically the home of demons. She battled with Fatalis and Mordicus and was greatly wounded but still managed to survive. It is shown in a flashback that she and the 7th ranked member of the guild were responsible for Noel's mother's death.

Striker

A member of the Madosa Guild whose face is kept hidden. He appears to be on good terms with Henduh (though he's more like an underling) and moves incredibly fast. He may be some sort of cyborg as he expressed no concern after losing his fingers.

Gelpa

Member of the Madosa Guild and also an assassin/lieutenant. Marked with the guild symbol in his left eye and can leap great distances as well as expertly conceal himself. He can also move through solid objects. He however, seems to have more of a conscious when killing. He saves both Noel and Notra from death.

Hwee-Young

A feisty gladiator fighter who feels the need to fight anyone with a weapon. After the battle in the forest he is approached by a girl who looks similar to Chun-Lang and is asked to meet with the leader of the Madosa Guild. He accepts and he is seen again in volume 9 and has apparently joined the Madosa Guild.

Unknown Female Assassin

This masked woman was responsible for eliminating Alcan. Later when she approaches Hwee-Young she removes her mask and it is revealed that she looks very similar to Chun-Lang in his female form. She makes an offer for Hwee-Young to join the Guild and he apparently accepts this offer as he is seen with her later in the series.

Unknown Female

Nothing is known about this member other than that she was present at a meeting of the Guild and reported on the various countries.

Unknown Male

Nothing is known about this member other than he was also present at the meeting.
