= Rebirth (manhwa) =

1998–2010 manhwa series

- Cover of the Tokyopop edition of Rebirth vol. 1 (2003), art by Lee Kang-woo

리버스 RR: Ribeoseu MR: Ribŏsŭ
- Genre: Action, Tragedy, Drama, Epic fantasy, Supernatural
- Author: Lee Kang-woo
- Publisher: Daiwon C.I. (South Korea)
- English publisher: AUS: Madman Entertainment; NA: Tokyopop
- Magazine: Comic Champ (South Korea)
- Original run: 1998–2010
- Collected volumes: 26

Rebirth (Korean: 리버스, romanized: Libus; Stylization: 리버스(REBIRTH)) is a manhwa series created and drawn by Lee Kang-woo, writing under the pen name of Woo. It has been published in serialized format in the Korean weekly comic magazine Comic Champ since 1998. The series was completed in 2010 with twenty-six volumes in Korea.

Rebirth is the story of a 17th-century vampire named Deshwitat L. Rudbich. It follows his adventures after he is cast into a 300-year limbo by his enemies.

Rebirth was published in English by Tokyopop, with adaptation by Bryce P. Coleman and Aaron Sparrow. As of February 2009, twenty-two volumes have been published in English. Rebirth was published in Swedish by Wahlströms. The Swedish release started in the summer of 2005, and a total of 16 volumes were published. Rebirth was published in Italy by Flashbook.

== Plot ==
In the 17th century Deshwitat, the main character and vampire, is betrayed by his friend Kalutika and imprisoned for rest of eternity. Three-hundred years later he is released from his eternal prison by accident and has a thirst for "Kal's" blood. Accompanied by Millenear Shephield, an excommunicated exorcist, Remi Do, the daughter of a paranormal investigator, and a long time friend, he starts on his long quest for revenge.

Three hundred years ago the Dark Magician Deshwitat Lived Rudbich, a vampire, was sealed in limbo by the Light Magician Kalutika. Resurrected in the present day, Deshwitat has vowed to destroy Kalutika, and now, with the help of a team of spiritual warriors, seeks the means to use Light Magic to achieve his ends.

== Characters ==
- Deshwitat L. Rudbich
- Kalutika Maybus
- Millenear Shephield
- Remi Do
- Rett Butler
- Beryun
- Lilith Servino
- Master Tae
- Mr. Grey
- Eiji Inaba
- Draestail

== Production ==
Millenear Shephield's last name is derived from American baseball player, Gary Sheffield.
