= Korea News Agency Commission =

Korea News Agency Commission (Korean: 뉴스통신진흥회) is a non-profit corporation that falls under the jurisdiction of the Ministry of Culture, Sports and Tourism. It was created on November 4, 2005, in order to promote the development of news agencies and make sure that Yonhap News Agency fulfills its public responsibilities by being independent and impartial with the way the news is reported. The Korea News Agency Commission is the majority shareholder of Yonhap News Agency.

== Organization ==
- Chair
  - Kim Yeong-man
- Director
  - Kim Seung-dong
  - Kim Hwan-joo
  - Song Tae-kwon
  - Eom Ju-woong
  - Jeong Il-yong
  - Hwang Ho-taek
