= Super Champ =

South Korean magazine

- Cover of the July 2008 issue
- Categories: Comics
- Frequency: Monthly
- Publisher: Daewon C.I.
- First issue: October 31, 2006
- Country: South Korea
- Language: Korean

Super Champ (Korean: 수퍼챔프) is a South Korean magazine produced by Daewon C.I. It is available only online and specializes in serializing domestic and imported comics. Its first issue was published in 2006 and it is released on the last day of each month. Following publication in Super Champ, individual series are later collected into volumes and published in hard copy form under the Super Champ Comics (SC Comics) imprint.

== Serializations ==
The following titles are or have been serialized in Super Champ or printed under the Super Champ Comics imprint.

Title	Creator	Years
Devil Kings Basara (Brave 10, 브레이브10)	Kairi Shimotsuki	2008–present
Kamisama Kazoku (신족가족, Sinjok Gajok)	Yoshikazu Kuwashima, story; TaPari, art	2006–present
Karma (카르마, Kareuma)	Jo Jun-hui (조준희)	2007–present
Nephilim (네피림존, Nepirimjon)	Ryu Kum-chel	2007–present
New Kumiho (신 구미호, Sin Guimho)	Han Hyeon-dong (한현동)	2002–present
North Aria (노녘의 아리아, Nonyeokui Aria)	Kang Gyeong-mi (강경미), story; Kang Ji-min (강지민), art	2008–present
Paradise Murdered (극락도 살인사건, Geukrakdo Sarinsageon)	Kim Sun-chul (김순철)	2007-present
Raiders (레이더스, Reideoseu)	Park Jin-jun (박진준)	2007-present
Taimashin (퇴마침 아카무시마살기, Toemachim Akamusimasalgi)	Hideyuki Kikuchi, story; Shin Yong-gwan (신용관 ), art	2008-present
Tenshi no Frypan (천사의 프라이팬, Cheonsa ui Peuraipaen)	Etsushi Ogawa	2007-present
Vampire Bund (뱀파이어 번드, Baempaieo Beondeu)	Tamaki Nozomu	2007-present
Witch Buster (위치헌터, Wichi Heonteo)	Cho Jung-man (조정만)	2006-present
Zatch Bell! (금색의 갓슈!!, Geumsaegui Gatsyu!!)	Makoto Raiku	2005–present
