= Threads of Time =

1999–2003 manhwa series by Mi-young Noh

- Cover of the first volume of the English release

살례탑 RR: Sallyetap MR: Sallyet'ap
- Genre: Action-adventure; Historical romance
- Author: Mi-young Noh
- Publisher: Daewon C.I.
- English publisher: NA: Tokyopop
- Magazine: Junior Champ
- Original run: 1999–2003
- Collected volumes: 11

Threads of Time (Korean: 살례탑) is a South Korean manhwa series written and illustrated by Mi-young Noh. It was serialized in Daewon C.I.'s Junior Champ magazine from 1999 to 2003, with its individual chapters collected into eleven volumes. It follows a modern high school student who is sent back in time to the era of the Mongol invasions of Korea.

== Plot ==
High school student Moon Bin Kim has difficulty sleeping due to a recurring nightmare where he is stranded over a thousand years in the past chasing a dark-haired girl into a deep abyss. Before long, the nightmare overwhelms him, and he is unable to tell whether he is Moon Bin, a modern teenager from Seoul, or Sa Kyoung Kim, the son of a prominent warrior family in the middle of the first Millennium. People in his present-day life assume roles in his historical life as he struggles to learn exactly who he is and what he is expected to do, straddling a transmigratory portal through time and space.

In the present, his school's kumdo club battles to stay in the championships but in the past, Moon Bin finds himself at the threshold of a territorial dispute on the plains of Mongolia.

== Characters ==
Moon Bin Kim / Sa Kyoung Kim
A student living on his own who suffers an accident and enters a coma in which his soul is sent back in time. Throughout his adventures, he discovers that he was Salreetai in a former life and was dragged back in time by the souls of the family of his current body, whom Salreetai killed. He later realizes that he must kill Salreetai and himself to end this ordeal. It is also revealed to him that he took over Sa Kyoung's body when Sa Kyoung died during his comatose state.
Altanhads / Euen Eun Kyo
A granddaughter of Genghis Khan who acts as a love interest for both Moon Bin, who she loves, and Salreetai, to whom she is betrothed. As a woman, she was unable to take a position as a warrior, but by disguising herself as a man and winning a competition, she was able to take the position of a commander at Salreetai's side. She is level-headed and smart, knowing that there are those on the battlefield who do not want her there and working to combat it by making herself an essential source of information.
Salreetai
A ruthless Mongol general who was sent to conquer Koryo (Korea). He is Engaged to Altanhads and known for his vicious nature on the battlefield.
Yeon Young / Chung War
A servant of Sa Kyoung who was enslaved and sold in Mongol territory.
Sa Lum
Sa Kyoung's older sister. She is the one that pulled Moon Bin underwater in the pool and is therefore responsible for his trip to the past. She is ultimately raped and killed by Salreetai. Before her death, her body was in a comatose state, yet her spirit, both while she was living and dead, often visited Moon Bin.
Ma Zhang Bo
A servant of Sa Kyoung that died in while hiding from the Mongols
Kim Kyung Sohn
A renowned Korean General and Sa Kyoung's father. He is ultimately killed by Salreetai.
Ogodei Deh-Khan
The leader of the Mongols.

== Publication ==
Written and illustrated by Mi-young Noh, the series began serialization in Daewon C.I.'s Junior Champ magazine in December 1999. Its serialization was completed in 2003. Its individual chapters were collected into eleven volumes.

Tokyopop published the series in English.

== Reception ==
Sheena McNeil of Sequential Tart felt the story was an "excellent twist" on time travel as a plot device. She described the art as "having a fresh intensity" and noted its distinction from manga artwork. However, she felt it was dull at times and wished it had more action scenes. Koo Bon-joon of The Hankyoreh felt the illustrations showed "outstanding artistry", especially considering that it was Noh's first work targeted at boys.
