= Gwangju News =

English Language Korean news Magazine

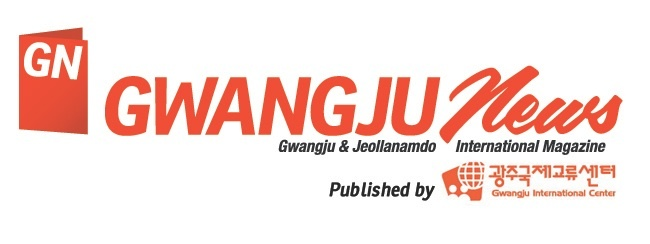
Logo- gwangju news

Gwangju News (GN) is an English language, full-color, local monthly news magazine. It is a free, non-profit publication written and produced by volunteers. It covers events and news in Gwangju and the larger South Jeolla Province area with an emphasis on international residents and English-speaking communities. Gwangju News is the oldest monthly English language magazine for a general audience in all of Korea. It is the second oldest monthly English publication when accounting for non-specialist audience.

== History ==
Before Gwangju News existed in its current format, the precursor to the magazine was a newsletter published by the English Department at Chonnam National University (CNU) in Gwangju. Far from being the regular monthly publication that GN is today, the newsletter ran only intermittently. The next step in the evolution of GN was the establishment of the Kwangju Centre for International Visitors (KCIV) in June 1999, which distributed a short newsletter in both English and Korean to its members.(The KCIV would go on to become the Gwanju International Center (GIC) in August 2002.) This early newsletter evolved into GN with the publication of the first issue in June 2001.

Over the years there have been many changes to the format of GN. In January 2004, the magazine adopted a new style featuring a full length cover photo. In May 2005 the magazine went to the glossy, full-color format that continues through the present. In addition to these changes in format, one of the most readily noticeable changes to the magazine has been its size. From humble beginnings of the 4-page black and white first issue of June 2001, GN expanded to 24 pages in February 2005, 40 pages in January 2006, 48 pages in December 2006, all the way to its current length of 56 pages. As of May 2013, GN magazine is up to issue number 135, printing 4000 copies every month. Other important changes include the addition of an online version of GN starting in November 2009. In addition, GN started using recycled paper for the print version of the magazine in February 2009, but had to abandon the practice due to financial considerations.

== Principle ==
Gwangju News functions to cover issues local to the city of Gwangju and the wider Jeollanam-do region. The focus is on events and news that are of interest to international expats and the local English-speaking communities. It also serves as a source of information on Korean society, culture, travel, history, and living information for these communities. The magazine strives to foster a strong multicultural society in Gwangju, helping international residents better understand Korea, helping local Korean readers understand Gwangju international community better, and strengthening ties between the two.

One of the main reasons Gwangju News magazine is able to distribute 4000 copies a month free of charge is that it is produced on a minimal budget made possible by the efforts of volunteer staff. Over the history of the magazine, hundreds of people, both Koreans and foreigners, have volunteered to contribute to the magazine, having done everything from editing and copy-editing, arranging interviews and finding stories, writing articles and proofreading, taking photos, and improving advertising and distributing.

Gwangju News is the pride of the GIC. One of the main reasons for this source of pride is its place as the oldest English magazine in Gwangju, and as the oldest monthly English language magazine for a general audience in all of Korea.

== Connected ==
GN magazine is the official publications of the GIC. The GIC membership fees help to fund the publication of GN magazine, in addition to revenue from advertisers. GN magazine has the online site.
