= LG Mobile World Cup =

2010 international texting competition

The logo of the Indonesian portion of the World Cup

The LG Mobile World Cup was an international competition held on January 14, 2010, by LG Electronics in which participants competed using their texting speed and accuracy. It was held at Gotham Hall in New York City. Thirteen teams representing their countries competed for a total of $130,000 USD in prize money.

== Format ==
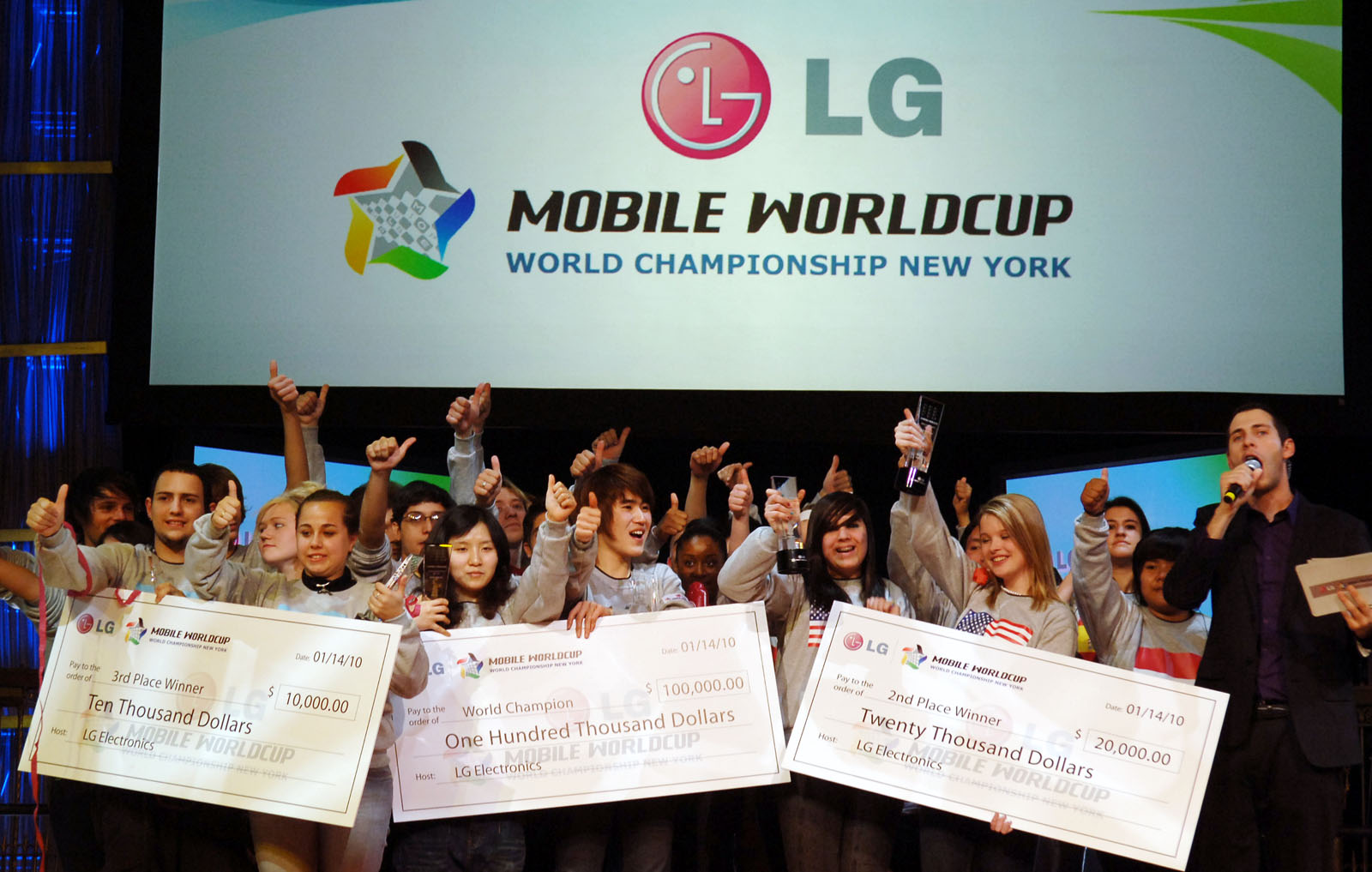
All of the competitors participating in the competition along with the host BJ Lange

Teams consist of two members. One member competes using a QWERTY keyboard, while the other member uses a numeric keypad. Thirteen countries participated in the 2010 competition: Argentina, Australia, Brazil, Canada, Indonesia, Mexico, New Zealand, Portugal, Russia, South Africa, South Korea, Spain, and the United States.

Previously, LG hosted texting competitions in individual countries such as the United States and South Korea. The United States had competitions for 2007, 2008, and 2009. South Korea had competitions in 2008 and 2009. However, 2010 was the first year when countries competed against each other.

=== Qualification ===
Teams earned the right to participate in regional qualifiers. Over six million people registered to compete in the tournament. Each team participated in five separate events: "break the wall", "monster popping", "moving pillar", "running relay", and "racing replay". The basic premise was to copy a scrolling piece of text as quickly as possible. No errors were allowed in transcription. All of the text messages were in the native language of the participants, but had the same number of characters in order to ensure fairness. Additionally, all participants had to use the LG enV3, LG BL20 or LG GW520

== Results ==
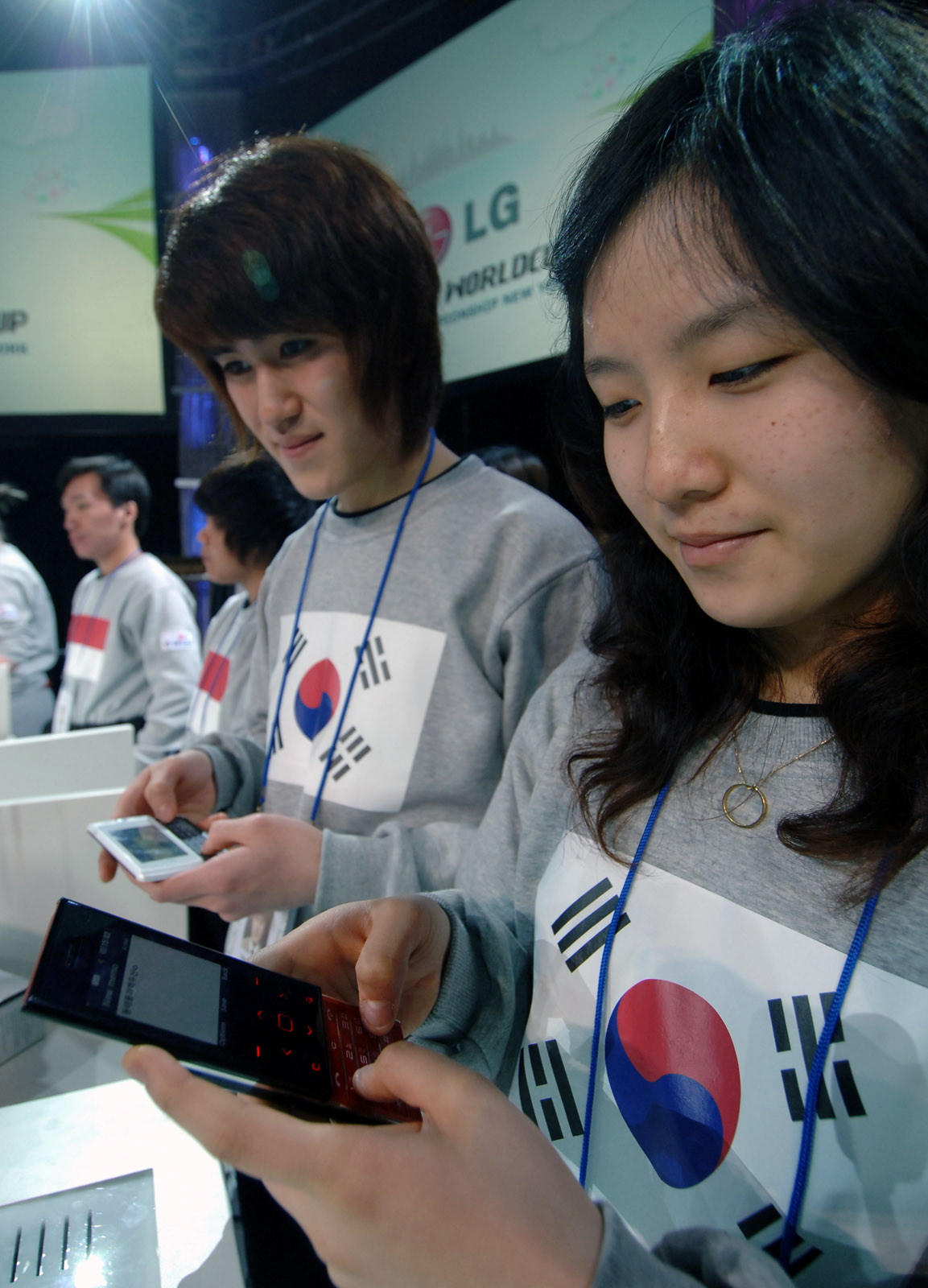
Ha Mok-Min and Bae Yeong-Ho

Ha Mok-min, aged 16, and her partner, 17-year-old Bae Yeong-ho, won first prize in the competition. Mok-min won the national championship, and was able to text at an average of 7.25 characters per second. She signed up for the competition when she noticed a kiosk in the mall, and saw the opportunity to win free movie tickets. Yeong-ho, a high school dropout, signed up in order to obtain money to buy a new car. The second-place finishers were Kate Moore and Morgan Dynda from the United States. The third place team was from Argentina (Agustina Montegna and Juan Ignacio Aufranc)

The prizes were set at US$100,000 per pair for first place, $20,000 per pair for second place and $10,000 per pair for third place.

== Records ==
A side competition was offered to see who could beat the Guinness Book of World Records record for fastest text message sent. This record was broken by Pedro Matias from Portugal. He typed a 264-character text message in 1:59. The record for fastest keystrokes per minute on a numeric keyboard was set by Indonesia at 306, while the most keystrokes per minute record on a QWERTY keyboard was set by South Korea at 357.
