= Yonhap News Agency =

South Korean news agency

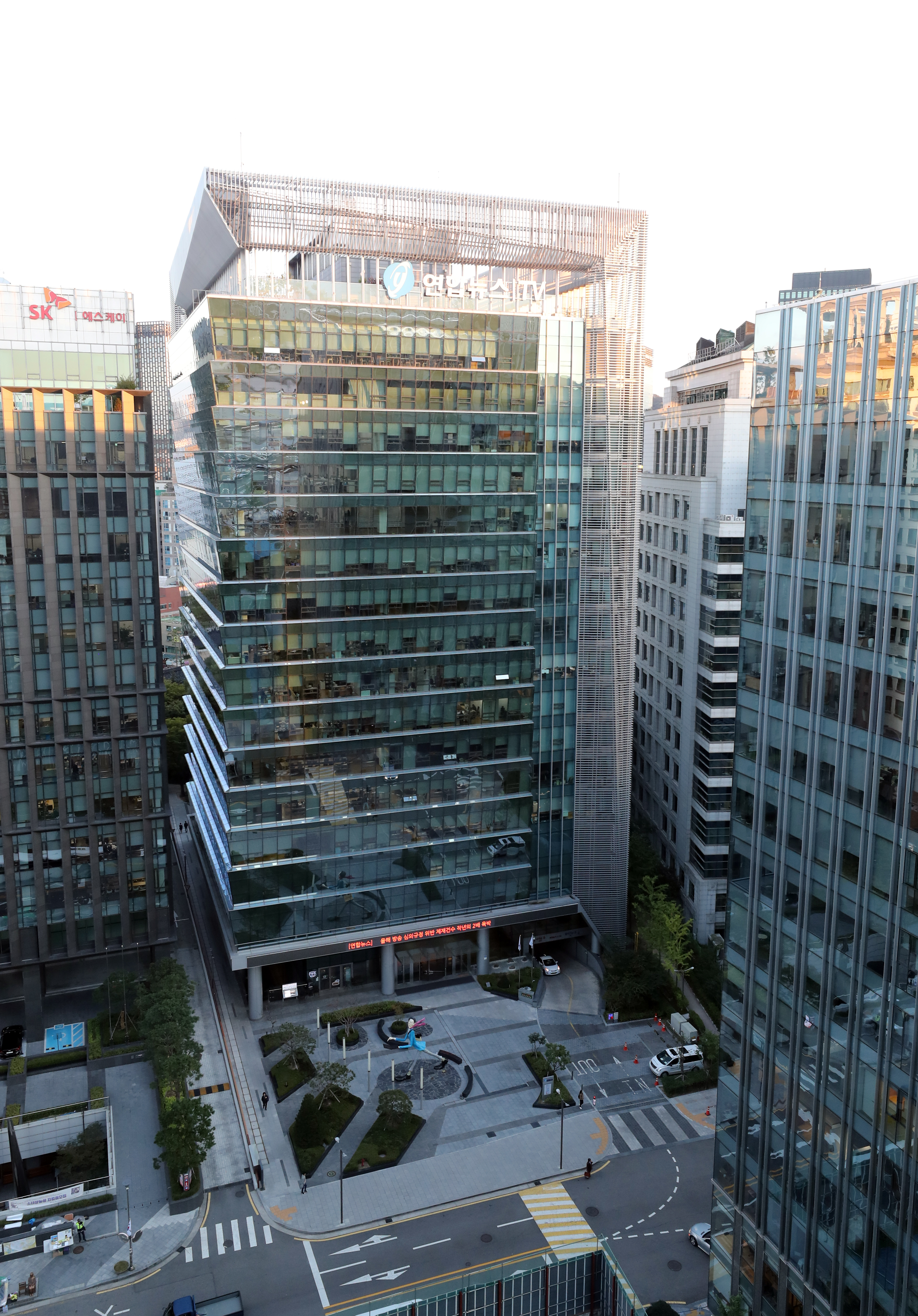
- YNA headquarters in Jongno-gu, Seoul
- Founded: 19 December 1980; 45 years ago
- Headquarters: Seoul, South Korea
- Owners: Korea News Agency Commission: 30.77%; Korean Broadcasting System: 27.78%; Munhwa Broadcasting Corporation: 22.30%

Korean name
- Hangul: 연합뉴스
- Hanja: 聯合뉴스
- RR: Yeonhap nyuseu
- MR: Yŏnhap nyusŭ
- Website: www.yna.co.kr

Yonhap News Agency (Korean: 연합뉴스; pronounced [jʌn.hap̚], literally "federation" or "united") is a major news agency in South Korea. It is based in Seoul, South Korea. Yonhap provides news articles, pictures, and other information to newspapers, TV networks and other media in South Korea.

== History ==
Yonhap was established on 19 December 1980, through the merger of Hapdong News Agency and Orient Press. The Hapdong News Agency itself emerged in late 1945 out of the short-lived Kukje News, which had operated for two months out of the office of the Domei, the former Japanese news agency that had functioned in Korea during the Japanese colonial era.

In 1999, Yonhap took over the Naewoe News Agency. Naewoe was a South Korea government-affiliated organization, created in the mid-1970s, tasked with publishing information and analysis on North Korea from a South Korean perspective through books and journals. Naewoe was known to have close links with South Korea's intelligence agency, and according to the British academic and historian James Hoare, Naowoe's publications became "less partisan after the late 1980s and are often useful source of information on North Korea". In 1999, Naewoe merged with Yonhap News Agency, with materials on North Korea continued to be "distributed for free as part of the government's propaganda effort". According to the U.S. Library of Congress, "Originally a propaganda vehicle that followed the government line on unification policy issued, Naowae Press became increasingly objective and moderate in tone in the mid-1980s in interpreting political, social, and economic developments in North Korea". Naowae's principal publication was the monthly magazine Vantage Point: Developments in North Korea, which continued to be published by Yonhap until its discontinuation in 2016.

== Activity ==
Yonhap maintains various agreements with 90 non-Korean news agencies, and also has a services-exchange agreement with North Korea's Korean Central News Agency (KCNA) agency, signed in 2002. It is the only Korean wire service that works with foreign news agencies, and provides a limited but freely-available selection of news on its website in Korean, English, Chinese, Japanese, Spanish, Arabic, and French.

Yonhap is South Korea's only news agency large enough to have some 60 correspondents abroad and 600 reporters across the nation. Its largest shareholder is the Korea News Agency Commission (KONAC). Yonhap was the host news agency of the 1988 Seoul Summer Olympics, and was elected twice to the board of the Organization of Asia-Pacific News Agencies (OANA). In 2021, Yonhap partnered with the production company "Victory Contents" for a Korean drama screenplay contest.

In 2003, the South Korean government passed a law giving financial and systematic assistance to the agency, to reinforce staff and provide equipment. In the legislation, it was also given the role of "promoting the country's image" to an international audience. The head of the Yonhap agency is usually affiliated with the government, which critics say harms press freedom and influences news-gathering. However, it is government affiliation, rather than press laws (which are supportive of press freedom), which is said to be the cause of any limitations, though the agency does criticise the government.

== Journalists ==
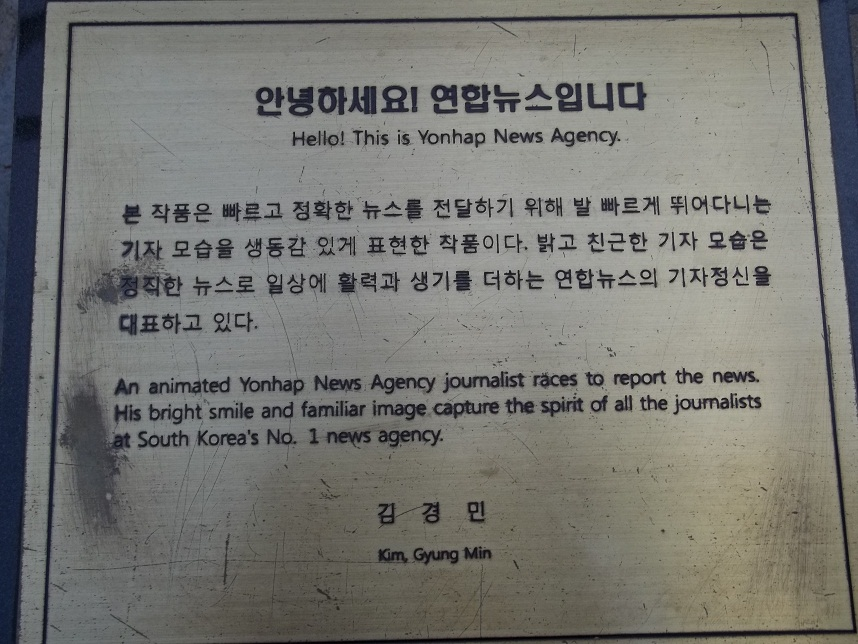
Plaque at foot of Yonhap Journalist statue, 2014

Yonhap employs about 600 reporters. It has some 60 correspondents in 26 countries. Yonhap is one of few Korean news organizations with a section specialized in North Korea reports. In 1998, Yonhap acquired from the National Intelligence Service a news wire service monitoring North Korean media and analyzing North Korea–related information. Yonhap incorporated the firm and its staff into the newsroom, creating a special division (often referred to as the "N.K. news desk") to improve its reporting on North Korea. In January 2009, two reporters from the N.K. news desk disclosed that Kim Jong Un had been chosen as heir apparent to North Korea's longtime leader, Kim Jong Il. Later, in 2010, the reporters won the grand journalism award for the exclusive story from the Korean Journalist Association. It was the first time in nine years that the association had awarded the prize.

== The Cho Gye-chang award ==
The Korean Journalist Association in 2010 established the Cho Gye-chang Journalism Award for achievement in international news reporting to commemorate Cho Gye-chang, the former Yonhap correspondent in Shenyang, China. Cho was killed in a car crash in December 2008 on the way back, after having conducted an interview with a Korean-Chinese academic. He was assigned to Shenyang in 2006 as the first South Korean correspondent in the northern Chinese city. Cho was widely admired as an ardent news writer who focused on North Korean affairs and Korean-Chinese communities. On the first anniversary of his demise, Korean-Chinese organizations and local journalists paid tribute to him as a "truly hardworking reporter with great professionalism". Cho's death marked the first time that Yonhap had lost a reporter on an international assignment.

== Global network ==
Yonhap News has more than 60 journalists in 33 areas in 25 countries.

=== Asia-Pacific ===
- Greater China: Beijing, Shanghai, Shenyang, Hong Kong, Taipei
- Japan: Tokyo, Osaka
- Vietnam: Hanoi
- Thailand: Bangkok
- India: New Delhi
- Indonesia: Jakarta
- Australia: Sydney
- New Zealand: Auckland

=== Europe ===
- United Kingdom: London
- France: Paris
- Germany: Berlin
- Switzerland: Geneva
- Russia: Moscow
- Belgium: Brussels

=== Americas ===
- United States: New York, Washington D.C., Chicago, Los Angeles, San Francisco
- Canada: Vancouver
- Brazil: São Paulo
- Mexico: Mexico City

=== Middle East ===
- Turkey: Istanbul
- United Arab Emirates: Dubai

=== Africa ===
- Egypt: Cairo
- Kenya: Nairobi
- South Africa: Johannesburg

== See also ==
- Communications in South Korea
- Korean Central News Agency, North Korean equivalent
- Media of South Korea
- Yonhap News TV
