= Hot Music =

1990–2008 South Korean music magazine

- Categories: Music
- Founded: November 1, 1990; 34 years ago
- Final issue: May 2008
- Country: South Korea
- Based in: Seoul, South Korea
- Language: Korean

Hot Music (Korean: 핫뮤직) was a South Korean music magazine. It was published in 1990 and closed in May 2008 as of the last issue. It is known as the most representative magazine in Korea in the 1990s that informed music culture.

== History ==
Hot Music was founded on 1 November 1990. Hot Music initially deals with various styles of pop together Since 1996, it has become a magazine specialising in rock. During the 1990s, Hot Music issued 20,000 copies for months, gained much popularity as a representative music magazine in South Korea. Since 2006, it selected Korea's leading rock and metal musicians every month to hold a "Hot Music Hot Music" concert.

Hot Music published its last May 2008 issue and closed due to financial difficulties. Until its closure, hot music published 204 publications.
