= Vantage Point: Developments in North Korea =

1978–2016 magazine from South Korea

- Cover the last issue of the magazine, in 2016, before being discontinued.
- Categories: News and analysis about North Korea (DPRK)
- Frequency: Monthly
- Publisher: Yonhap News Agency
- Founder: Naewoe News Agency
- First issue: May 1978
- Final issue Number: January 2016; 39:1
- Country: South Korea (ROK)
- Language: English
- Website: english.yonhapnews.co.kr/vantage/
- ISSN: 1228-517X
- OCLC: 923949595

Vantage Point: Developments in North Korea was an English-language magazine entirely focused on North Korean news and analysis, published monthly between 1978 and 2016. It was published by the South Korean Naewoe News Agency and later by the Yonhap News Agency.

== Scope and readership ==
Vantage Point provided news coverage and analysis on political, social, and economic developments in North Korea. It was mainly used as a source for researchers on North Korean affairs.

== History ==
Vantage Point began to be published in 1978. It was the most prominent periodical created by the Naewoe News Agency. This agency was a South Korea government-affiliated organization, created in the mid-1970s, and tasked with publishing information and analysis on North Korea from a South Korean perspective through books and journals.

Naewoe was known to have close links with South Korea's intelligence agency, and according to the British academic and historian James Hoare, Naowoe's publications became "less partisan after the late 1980s and are often useful source of information on North Korea". In 1999 Naewoe merged with Yonhap News Agency, with materials on North Korea continued to be "distributed for free as part of the government's propaganda effort". According to the U.S. Library of Congress "Originally a propaganda vehicle that followed the government line on unification policy issued, Naowae Press became increasingly objective and moderate in tone in the mid-1980s in interpreting political, social, and economic developments in North Korea".

Hoare further stated of Vantage Point that "until the late 1990s, it was somewhat partisan in the selection and interpretation of news, from 1998 to 2008, it became more neutral. Under the Lee Myung-bak government since 2008, something of the old approach returned." Despite these limitations, academic researchers have frequently used Vantage Point as a source for their research.

In 1996 Vantage Point became freely available on-line. In 2008 in "commemoration of the 30th anniversary of the publication's first issue" Vantage Point launched a companion weekly e-mail newsletter on North Korean news.

In 2016, in the first issue of the 39th annual volume, Park No-hwang, President-publisher of the Yonhap News Agency announced the discontinuation of the publication of the magazine. Park assured Vantage Point readers that Yonhap would continue to provide comprehensive coverage on North Korea, by stating: "This discontinuance, however, will never mean weakening Yonhap's North Korea news service. On the contrary, Yonhap, as a leading news agency in South Korea, has the grave obligation to play a part in helping materialize the Korean people's ardent wish for the reunification of the Korean Peninsula by providing our readers at home and abroad with accurate news on the reality of the communist North and the South Korean government's North Korea policy".

== Availability and successor platform ==
Physical prints are available in various libraries. As of 2017, PDFs of all issues since 2010 are made available online in Yonhap's website. Yonhap continues to provide coverage on North Korea in the form of news articles published in its website.
