= K Scene Magazine =

South Korean magazine

K Scene Magazine is a free bi-weekly English-language arts and entertainment magazine based in Seoul, South Korea. It has a circulation of 20,000 per month. Long renowned for its extensive classifieds section, K Scene has recently branched out into other areas including book reviews, travel writing, and sports coverage.

K Scene is published by a Seoul real estate magnate, but managed day-to-day by a staff of two Americans and a Pakistani.
