= Comic Champ =

South Korean manhwa magazine

- Cover of the July 15, 2008, issue of Comic Champ, featuring Jjang
- Categories: Manhwa, Manga
- Frequency: Biweekly
- Publisher: Daewon C.I.
- First issue: December 5, 1991
- Country: South Korea
- Language: Korean

Comic Champ (Korean: 코믹챔프; RR: Komik Chaempeu; lit. 'Comic Champ') is a biweekly magazine published by Daewon C.I. in South Korea. It specializes in serializations of domestic Korean and imported Japanese comics. Titles serialized in Comic Champ are collected into volumes and published under the Champ Comics imprint.

== History ==
Comic Champ was launched as a weekly magazine on December 5, 1991, under the name Boy Champ (소년챔프). Its purpose was to compete with Seoul Cultural Publisher's IQ Jump (아이큐점프) for the adolescent and teenage boys market. It had early success with its serialization of the Japanese basketball series Slam Dunk. In September 2002, the magazine changed its name to Comic Champ, and in 2006 changed to a biweekly publication schedule. Today it is published on the first and fifteenth days of each month.

== Serializations ==
The following is a list of series currently running in Comic Champ.

Series title	Author(s)	Premiered	Ref.
Born to Hate You (본 투 헤이트 유; Bon tu Heiteu Yu)	Jaygun	2016	
Cold Funeral (차가운 장례식; Chagaun Janglyesig)	Tamto	2025	
Dandadan (단다단)	Yukinobu Tatsu	2021	
Dead Ringer (데드링거; Dedeulinggeo)	Heug A Seong	2021	
Donggun (동군)	Lee Dan-i; Shin Ji-woo	2017	
Hot-Blooded Hero (열혈강호; Yeolhyeolgangho)	Jeon Geuk-jin; Yang Jae-hyeon	2013	
Kill Blue (킬 블루; Kil Beullu)	Tadatoshi Fujimaki	2023	
National Free Economic High School: Cecil High School Extra Story (국립자유경제고등학교 세실고 외전)	Yang Hye-seok; Lee Hyun-ji	2024	
One Piece (원피스; Won Piseu)	Eiichiro Oda	1998	
One Two! (원투!; Won Tu!)	Ongsusu	2025	
Real (리얼; Lieol)	Takehiko Inoue	2025	
Sakamoto Days (사카모토 데이즈; Sakamoto Deijeu)	Yuto Suzuki	2021	
Witch Buster (위치헌터; Wichi Heonteo)	Cho Jung-man	2013	

== See also ==
- List of manga magazines published outside of Japan
