= Daewon C.I. =

South Korean publishing company

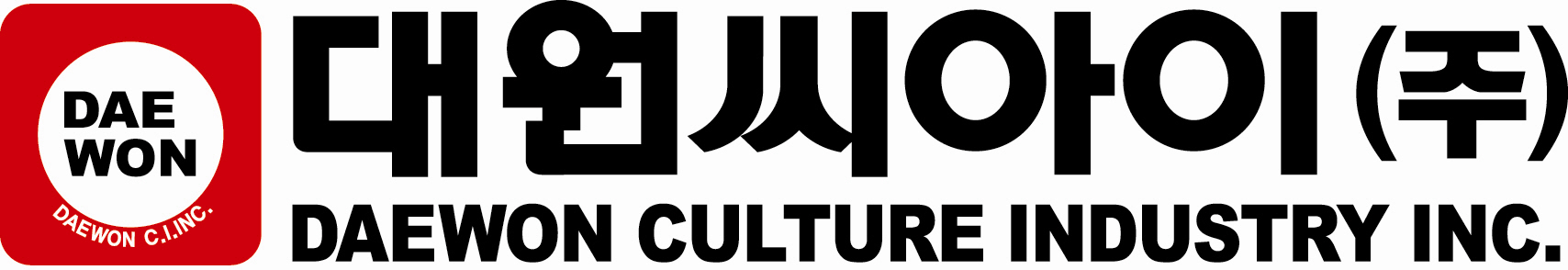
- Native name: 대원씨아이 주식회사
- Romanized name: Daewon Ssi-Ai Jusikhoesa
- Company type: Subsidiary
- Industry: Comics, Novels
- Founded: 1991; 35 years ago
- Headquarters: Seoul, South Korea
- Owner: Daewon Media (80.20%); Kakao Entertainment (19.80%)
- Parent: Daewon Media
- Website: http://www.dwci.co.kr

Daewon C.I. (Korean: 대원씨아이; Hanja: 大元 C.I.; RR: Daewon Ssi-Ai) or Daewon Culture Industry is a South Korean publisher known for releasing domestic and imported comics, children's books, and light novels. It was founded in 1991 and is a subsidiary of Daewon Media. In 2018, Daewon C.I., along with Seoul Media Comics and Haksan Publishing, made up 49 percent of the print comic book market in South Korea.

== History ==
Daewon C.I. was founded in 1991 as the publishing arm of Daewon Media. Its initial publication was the Comic Champ magazine in December of that year. In 1994, they launched Young Champ, and followed with two additional monthly magazines in 1995, which are no longer in print. Issue was also introduced that year as a biweekly magazine. The first Newtype Korea was published in 1999, and in 2002, Mag X was launched in Thailand. Its newest magazine, Super Champ debuted in 2006. In 2008, they had a magazine circulation of over 2,000,000 per year and published 11,000,000 collected volumes of comics.

In September 2018, KakaoPage (now Kakao Entertainment) acquired a 19.8 percent stake in Daewon C.I., making it the company's second biggest stakeholder after Daewon Media.

== Products ==
=== Comics ===
Daewon C.I. produces comics magazines that feature serialization of domestic and imported comics titles. Each magazine also has its own book imprint under which collected volumes of these comics are published. Its magazines are:

- Comic Champ, a biweekly first published in 1991, aimed at adolescent and young teenage boys.
- Young Champ, an online-only biweekly first published in 1994, aimed at young adults (changed to an online-only magazine in 2009, merging Super Champ's titles).
- Issue, a monthly first published in 1995, aimed at adolescent and teenage girls.

=== Light novels ===
Daewon C.I. publishes light novels under five imprints: Arche-Type (아키타입), Newtype Novels, Issue Novels (이슈 Novels), BLove (B愛 Novels), and Iliad (일리어드). Series published include:

- Allison
- Baccano!
- Ballad of a Shinigami
- Black Blood Brothers
- Bludgeoning Angel Dokuro-Chan
- Full Metal Panic!
- Gosick
- Haruhi Suzumiya
- Iriya no Sora, UFO no Natsu
- Kamisama Kazoku
- Kino's Journey
- Kyōran Kazoku Nikki
- Lillia and Treize
- Maburaho
- Read or Die
- Scrapped Princess
- Shakugan no Shana
- Toaru Majutsu no Index
- Trinity Blood
- Voices of a Distant Star

=== Newtype Korea ===
Newtype Korea, first published in July 1999, is a magazine released monthly. It is the Korean version of the Newtype magazine from Japan, and covers Japanese and domestic TV, DVD, and theatrical animation. Much of the content is translated directly from Japanese, with added features emphasizing domestic Korean productions.

=== Children's books ===
Daewon C.I. publishes entertainment and educational books for young children featuring a variety of characters. These characters include Winnie-the-Pooh, Pororo the Little Penguin, and Digimon.
