= Next Exit =

Comic by Christy Lijewski

- Cover of Next Exit 1 (2005), art by Christy Lijewski
- Genre: Action/adventure, science fantasy
- Author: Christy Lijewski
- Publisher: (United States) Slave Labor Graphics
- Original run: 2004–2006
- Volumes: 10

Rising Stars of Manga 3

Next Exit is an American original English-language manga series created by the comic artist Christy Lijewski. It is her first running series starring the two characters Millicent Retrab (the girl with the map) and Markesh (travelling companion and muito-mysteriouso Alchemist) in their quest to try to escape from the world of Akaline, a plane inhabited by people, figments, shadows, demons, and dolls (all in the most literal sense of the words).

== Characters ==
=== Main ===
Millicent Retrab
The comic centers on her and her friend and travelling companion Markesh, trying to find an exit from the dreamworld Alkaline. The mainstory line of Next Exit is a chain of events started when Retrab wins an Exit Map, one of the most valuable and rare artifacts of Alkaline, in a high-stakes chess game.

Retrab lead an abusive childhood in the real world, where she was often the victim of her mother's carelessness and anger. She was very close to her little brother Tony, who she was often left alone to take care of. He died when he fell from the balcony of their apartment while Retrab's mother was out. She blames herself for this, a feeling which was doubled by the blame and punishment of her mother. She became increasingly unstable mentally and was place on an unknown but probably fictional medication for her instability, and eventually attempted suicide by overdosing on them, and it is unknown whether or not this killed her, although it is almost definitely the event that took her to Akaline. Some amount of time after this she met Markesh, and spent most of the past few years with him in Alkaline, although she knows virtually nothing about his past.

Markesh Arcadia
Markesh is a skilled alchemist, and has a mysterious past. His partner (the female protagonist) is Retrab. Together the two seek escape from Alkaline, the world of dream-stuff. Although he is a printed character by Slave Labor Graphics He and Retrab made the first public appearance as the stars of Christy Lijewski's runner up entry in Rising Stars of Manga.

Markesh is serious, dignified, and very protective. He has a strong sense of duty, and is perhaps more than anything else, secretive. He is so much more careful and serious than Retrab that it seems nearly impossible that she is 5 years older than he is. He is an excellent fighter and alchemist. He likes spicy food, nature, and sleep, hates sweets, crowds, and bright lights. It is revealed in issue six of the manga that Markesh's face looks almost exactly like his father's, except for two distinguishing scars above and below his left eye.

Race West
A man with one eye in the middle of his forehead. He and Retrab have similar personalities, and become friends almost as soon as they meet. She allows him to call her "Millie" as long as she can call him "Captain Wombastic McFlingFlang the Third." Upon describing his occupation, Retrab gets the impression that he is a treasure hunter, but Markesh states bluntly that Race is a thief. Race sells what he finds in Academy ruins. He is well-travelled and amuses Retrab with jokes.

Race is looking for an exit map himself, which is the whole reason he started exploring the academy ruins in the first place. His reason is that because he has one eye, humans hate him because they think he is a figment; and figments hate him because they know he is not. He wishes to get back home because people didn’t judge him on his appearance.

Race also is wanted by the group Logos for possession of his alchemic weapon. His weapon was created by the academy out of mutated mass so that even people with no innate “alchemic pharmakeia” could transmute them. This ability however comes with a price, and the user must make a bond with and become one with it. Once it stabilizes itself into a solid mass, it apparently lives off the user like a parasite.

=== Secondary ===
Cara
A skilled alchemist and Syndoll engineer, she is an old friend of Markesh, and knows at least some of what he's hiding. She is a narcissistic self-proclaimed genius. Built Mortimer among countless others. She is also, apparently, a member of logos and is on field duty.

Professor Sevi
An alchemist and scientist, as well as a friend and rival of Cara's, who was killed by LOGOS. Mary Alice is his orphaned "daughter," actually a Syndoll. His pregnant wife died eighteen years prior to Next Exit. Physically he resembles Isshin Kurosaki from Bleach, Lijewski's favorite manga. Professor Sevi could also be said to resemble Maes Hughes from Fullmetal Alchemist, whose daughter was his pride and joy, just like how Mary Alice was to Sevi.

Queenie, The Mayor
She likes to wear just enough clothes to cover her breasts. She wants the head of her beloved syndoll Mortimer back.

Mortimer
Queenie's Syndoll, he has the numbers 0069 on his missing head. Mary Alice names him "Holmes." He was Queenie's lover.

Mary Alice, "The Guilliotine"
Professor Sevi's Daughter, a hermit girl with some mysterious happenings. She actually a syndoll, one who can perform alchemy, and the creator of Holmes and Watson, alchemic chimera or Frankenstein. She was nicknamed "The Guilliotine" because she was a murderer who beheaded syndolls for her chimeras. She wanted to make a human to replace her dead father. Mary Alice's character is based on the author's friend M. Alice LeGrow, who also works in comics (see Bizenghast).

Abraxas Arcadia
First Captain of the Illuminati, an unspecified but probably combat division of LOGOS. His hair is milky white, and eyes are blue. He is Markesh's older brother. There may be bad blood in their past. It is strongly implied that he killed Mary Alice's father, Professor Sevi. His pupils become slits when he is threatening.

Ren Cobalt
A Member of Illuminati, he is the shortest and youngest of the characters profiled in Volume 1. He is Abraxas' Vice Captain, implying the Illumnati as system that may be similar to the Gotei 13 in Bleach.

Franz the Cat
A talking cat. His body looks like a sac because his back legs are not drawn. He is a friend of Cara. He enjoys hats and cute girls. He has a cousin who looks identical but wears a monocle instead of a hat.

== Groups ==
LOGOS
A mysterious government force that defines what is and isn't existence in Alkaline. Cara, Abaraxas, and Ren are known members and it is strongly implied that Markesh was once one as well. They seem to be powerful alchemists, and were likely the "powers that be" that destroyed the Academy. Cara seems to be inactive, but still Affiliated.

The Academy
a mysterious and apparently extinct institution of Alkaline. They made among other things, all the exit maps. They were known to be alchemists.

== Species ==
Humans
Humans are the accidental creators of Alkaline. Their psychic residue (dreams, memories, perception) create the whole of existence. Some, but not all, might be Alchemists, but at this point it is unclear.

Figments/Fragments/Shadows
Creatures created entirely from the matter of Alkaline. any fantasy creature or nightmare animal is here. They are made from the same matter as Syndolls, but are created subconsciously. Fragments are figments of figments, and will cease existence if the mother-figment dies. This is seen in chapter 1, with the dragon Momma and the fragment Saru. Shadow's are like figments, but loosely tied to what's real. They appear more in Doors than Next Exit.

Syndolls
Human like creatures created by alchemizing and engineering the matter of Alkaline. They are marked with numbers on their foreheads and they can be as intelligent and emotional as real people. However, like Figments, their existence is dependent on the nature of Alkaline. They normally are incapable of doing alchemy, Mary-Alice being the only exception so far.

Other
It is suggested that some of the sentient and humanoid beings come from other realms that are "real," but are not human. This has yet to be fully explained. It is possible that all alchemist characters fall into this category.

== Alchemy ==
Alchemists in Alkaline seem able to transmute out of instinct alone. Also, in Alkaline, matter may only be transmuted once, after that nothing can be done to change the object again. Organic material can be altered with alchemy, including humans, although it does seem to cause some kind of corruption. This corruption is described as "poisoning."

Only certain people can do alchemy, and it is implied that simply having the talent is not enough to do advanced work. That apparently requires study and research. It is sometimes feared by the ignorant as a form of witchcraft.

== Doors ==
Doors, although being the basis for the series and having Markesh and Retrab as leads, is not a prequel. It can best be described as an alternate or simpler version of the same story, or a very similar story with the same characters.

Doors is the short one-shot comic story on which the comic Next Exit is based, having been written a few years earlier by Lijewski for the TokyoPop Rising Star of Manga Contest, where it was a runner-up. The basic premise, as well as the two protagonists, are the same. Retrab and Markesh are seeking a "Door" (a term which in the series is replaced by exit) out of the world of Alkaline, a fantastic dreamscape where thoughts mould and change as rapidly as they can while abiding the rules of this reality. They journey through various traps and monsters (called shadows) to try to reach a door. And eventually they do, but it's not exactly what they expected...

Differences include that Markesh's alchemy is less developed (not in terms of his ability but in explanation), motorized vehicles seem more common place, and Retrab is more useful in a fight, though still careless. Also, Exits are called Doors and neither Maps nor the Academy are mentioned. Doors also are apparently easier to find than exits, but they are individualized, only working for certain people, or even, only a certain person.

It ends up that upon reaching the door, the duo cannot reach it as the door is on the other side of a very deep and wide cliff. Retrab, However, notices a pair of foot prints in the ground facing the door, and encourages Markesh to stand on them. He does and nothing happens, although he does remark that it makes him feel "like an idiot". Retrab shrugs and begins to walk away saying that it must not be their door, but Markesh stops, saying that it might be hers.

Convinced that it won't be, Retrab stands nonchalantly on the foot prints and begins to say how nothing is happening just in time for a bridge of blocks to rise out of the gap and fill the space to the door. She looks on in denial as she realizes that this is her door, but not Markesh's. After some cajoling, Markesh is able to convince her to fearfully leave him behind, promising that he will follow her soon. The comic ends by revealing Retrab, waking in a hospital bed next to several others, the nearest being an unconscious Markesh, and a pull out through another door, revealing the area to be the coma center. Alkaline in this early version of the story is the land where all those forced out of the conscious plane must live. It is yet to be seen if this reality is also true in the series.

=== Differences Between Doors and Next Exit ===
Although very similar, the differences between the two stories are noticeable. The art differs the least, the only change being slight alterations to Retrab's visor. The characters are less well-developed in Doors. Retrab seems a bit more useful in a fight in Doors. The alchemy is present in Doors, but lacks any major development.

Doors, being a short story, has an ending. The change from doors to exits could mean that the ways out are more abstract in Next Exit (in Doors, it is implied that every door is in fact a household door.) The term "exit" has not been defined; exits are simply ways of leaving Alkaline.

== References to other media ==
Lijewski is a big fan of Japanese Manga and American Cartoons, and this is shown in the art, story, and dialogue of her comic. Here are some of them:

- In Issue Two of Next Exit Retrab Yells "SWEET ZOMBIE JESUS!" the favorite exclamation of Professor Farnsworth in the cartoon Futurama.
- Like Tite Kubo Lijewski assigns her characters theme songs, though she calls them "Image Songs".
- A sign in Cara's shop reads "Automail" in English and katakana.
