= List of Bizenghast volumes =

Cover of the Finnish edition of Bizenghast (2005). Art by M. Alice LeGrow

Bizenghast is a completed original English-language (OEL) manga written and illustrated by M. Alice LeGrow, and published in North America by Tokyopop. As of April 2012, eight volumes have been released, the first seven of which were published by Tokyopop. The first was released on August 9, 2005; the final was published July 31, 2012. Set in the haunted New England town of Bizenghast, the story follows an orphaned teenage girl who is tasked with returning each night to an ancient mausoleum to free the ghosts within the building. The series is also licensed in New Zealand and Australia by Madman Entertainment, in Hungary by Mangattack, in Germany by Tokyopop Germany, in Finland by Pauna Media Group, and in Russia by Comix-art.

== Volume list ==
No.	North American release date	North American ISBN
01	August 9, 2005	978-1-59532-743-7
01: "The Sickness"; 02: "The Gilded Cage"; 03: "The Stranglehold"; 04: "The Coming Storm"; 05: "The Fairywaters"; 06: "The Wild Beast"; 07: "The Angel in Disguise"
02	June 13, 2006	978-1-59532-744-4
01: "Curiouser and Curiouser"; 02: "The Sickness"; 03: "The Quarrel"; 04: "The Plague-Bearer"; 05: "The Apple of Life"; 06: "The Lady of the Lake"
03	August 14, 2007	978-1-59532-745-1
01: "The Pleasure Palace"; 02: "The Night Watch"; 03: "The Fly-Trap"; 04: "The Blind"; 05: "The Sinful Vanities"; 06: "The Unmasking"
04	December 11, 2007	978-1-4278-0484-6
01: "The Perfect Woman"; 02: "The Pariah"; 03: "The Hidden Prophecy"; 04: "The Hunt"; 05: "The Hunted"; 06: "The Road Beyond"
05	July 1, 2008	978-1-4278-0485-3
01: "The Family Shunned"; 02: "The Death Wish"; 03: "The Prince Returns"; 04: "The 13th Arcana"; 05: "The Angel Speaks"
06	August 1, 2009	978-1-4278-1536-1
01: "The Modern Temple"; 02: "The Troubling Dream"; 03: "The Empty Nest"; 04: "The Madness"; 05: "The Hidden Nursery"; 06: "The Second Rising"
07	July 1, 2010	978-1-4278-1766-2
01: "Trials of Dinah, Part One: The Beloved Queen"; 02: "The Mausoleum's Day off"; 03: "The Imaginary Court"
08	July 31, 2012	978-1-4278-5646-3
