= Jason Thompson (writer) =

American writer and critic (born 1974)

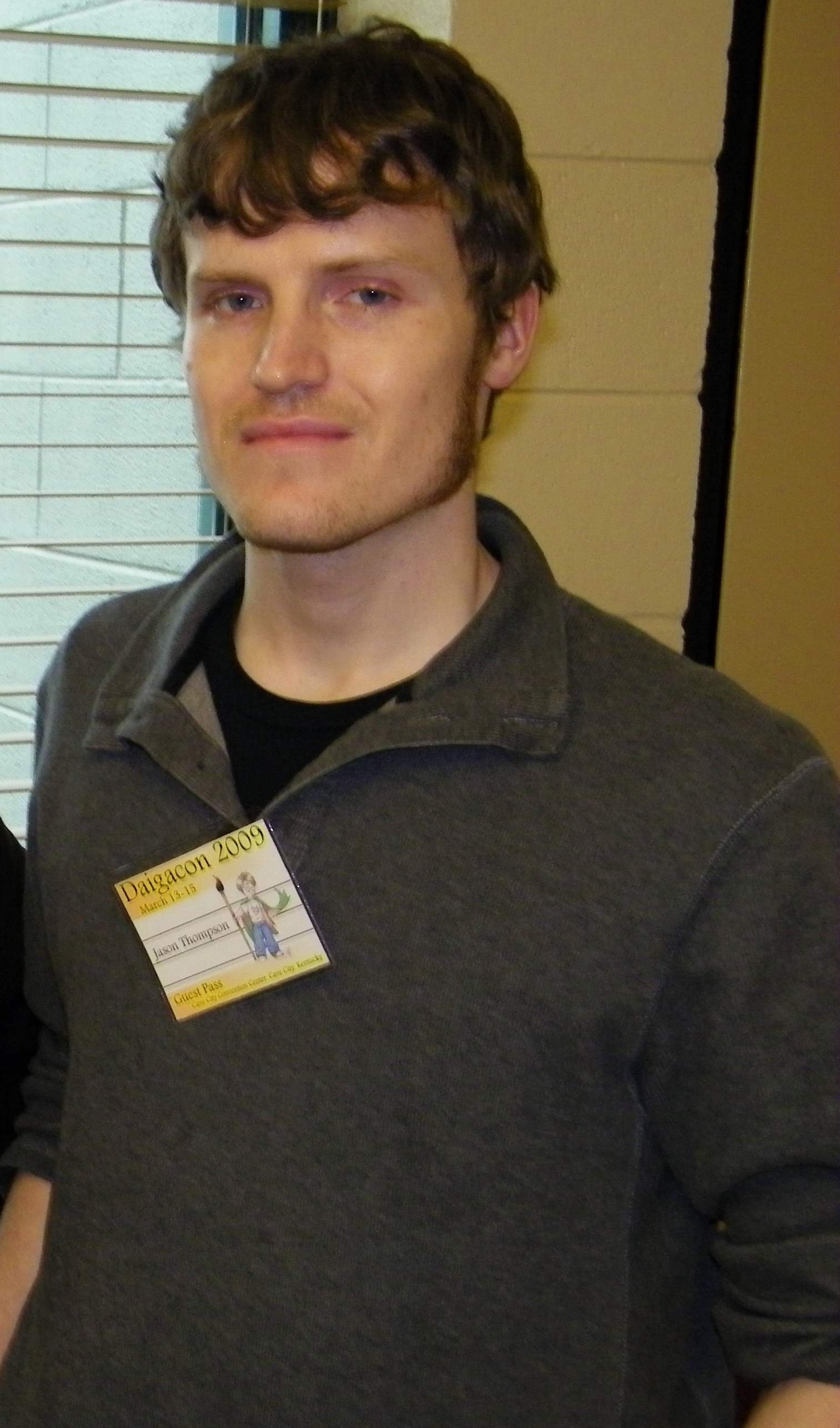
- Jason Thompson at Daigacon 2009
- Born: Jason Bradley Thompson; October 13, 1974 (age 52); San Francisco, California, U.S.
- Education: University of California, San Diego (B.A. in Creative Writing, 1995)
- Occupations: Artist, illustrator, author, journalist, comics artist, and editor
- Writing career
- Subject: Comics
- Notable work: Manga: The Complete Guide
- Website: mockman.com

Jason Bradley Thompson (born October 13, 1974) is an American artist, author, comics creator, critic, and editor. He is best known for his Eisner-nominated book Manga: The Complete Guide, his graphic novel interpretation of H. P. Lovecraft's DreamQuest of Unknown Kadath and Other Stories, and his Dungeons and Dragons adventure walkthrough maps published by Wizards of the Coast on their website as well in books such as Waterdeep Dragon Heist.

== Life and career ==
Jason Thompson was born in San Francisco, California, on October 13, 1974, and lived in Healdsburg, California, for most of his childhood and adolescence. He began drawing and writing in the 1980s. He first became an anime and manga fan in 1991, joining his college's anime club at University of California, San Diego while studying English and creative writing and art. Thompson graduated in 1995 at the age of 20.

In the late 1990s, Thompson self-published some comics, including 1997's The Dream-Quest of Unknown Kadath, which he regards as his 'first real comic'.

In 1996, Thompson began a career as an editor at Viz Media. Thompson worked there for 14 years (10 as senior editor, 4 freelance) editing the English-language edition of over 30 manga series including Naruto (the bestselling manga in the US), Dragon Ball, Yu-Gi-Oh!, Fullmetal Alchemist, Shaman King, One Piece, JoJo's Bizarre Adventure, Hana-Kimi, Uzumaki, Street Fighter, and others.

He also launched two national magazines, Shonen Jump and Game On! USA.

Thompson created his own webcomic, The Stiff (2001 onwards), which he describes as a "manga-influenced romantic comedy" and "a horrendous, gruesome horror story", influenced by indie American comics and Japanese horror manga. It was planned to be 1000 pages long, and was published on Girlamatic between 2003 and 2006 as one of their launch titles.

In 2003, Thompson's comic adaptation of The Dream-Quest of Unknown Kadath was adapted into a feature-length film that used artwork from Jason Thompson's comic series, as well as original artwork by Thompson. It premiered on October 11, 2003, at the H. P. Lovecraft Film Festival and was later released on DVD.

As of 2007, Thompson wrote for Otaku USA.

Thompson is the author of Manga: The Complete Guide (Del Rey, 2007), which he conceived in 2000. As an appendix to Manga: The Complete Guide, he posted daily reviews of manga on Suvudu.com, beginning in November 2009 for a year.

He made a cameo appearance in Hiro Mashima's Fairy Tail.

Thompson is the creator of the graphic novel, King of RPGs with Victor Hao, which he describes as a fusion between shōnen manga and tabletop roleplaying games. It was released in January 2010. He had previously submitted a pilot of the series to Tokyopop's Rising Stars of Manga competition, but later decided to take the concept to Del Rey, who matched him with artist Victor Hao. Volume Two was released on May 24, 2011, and made it to The New York Times Best Seller list.

In 2009, Thompson was the artist of The Legend of Bold Riley: The Serpent in the Belly, part of a series written by Leia Weathington. It is available online, and was also published in print in 2012 by Northwest Press.

In November 2011, Thompson successfully raised money on Kickstarter for a hardcover release of the graphic novel The Dream Quest of Unknown Kadath and Other Stories, featuring his 122-page Kadath story (made from 1997 to 1999), as well as three other stories from the Dreamlands series: The Strange High House in the Mist (a comic adaptation of the eponymous story, made from June 2009 to January 2011), The White Ship, and Celephais (made from March–September 2011). Books began shipping to supporters in March 2012, and can be currently bought through Thompson's website and other locations.

Thompson also ran the "House of 1000 Manga" column on Anime News Network alongside Shaenon K. Garrity, which he initially started to write about lesser-known manga that he discovered around his home.

== Bibliography ==
- Manga: The Complete Guide (Del Rey, 2007), ISBN 978-0-345-48590-8
