= Christy Lijewski =

American comic book artist and illustrator

- Born: 1981 (age 44–45) Baltimore, Maryland, U.S.
- Areas: Writer, Penciller, Inker
- Pseudonyms: Nyanko-Chan, and-babel-fell
- Notable works: Next Exit; RE:Play

Christy Lijewski (born 1981 in Baltimore, Maryland) is an American comic book artist and illustrator who specializes in OEL manga.

== Life and career ==
Christy Lijewski was born in 1981 in Baltimore, Maryland, United States. As a young girl, she wanted to study paleontology, but decided to be a cartoonist after reading a comic during her middle-school years. A fan of American comic books, she enjoyed comics as an artistic medium, but did not feel a connection to the superhero stories. She watched a copy of the magical girl anime (Japanese animated cartoon) Sailor Moon, and became interested in anime and manga (Japanese comics). She found manga appealing, because of the wide range of narrative genres. She graduated from Savannah College of Art and Design with a Bachelor of Fine Arts in Sequential Art.

Her short story "Doors" won a runner-up place in Tokyopop's 2004 Rising Stars of Manga contest. Inspired by her "vivid dreams," "Doors" focuses on two people, twenty-two-year-old Retrab and twenty-year-old Markesh, as they search for a door in a fantasy world. They eventually find one, but it is meant only for Retrab. Upon going through the door, she awakens in a hospital from a coma while Markesh is still comatose. Although this meant that the Lijewski did not win the guaranteed contract with Tokyopop, it did bring her work into the public. "Doors" was also the genesis of Lijewski's series Next Exit, which Slave Labor Graphics began to publish in 2004. Next Exit is an expanded version of the story in "Doors", the two even sharing the main characters Retrab and Markesh. She was then one of a few runner up artists to enter a deal publishing with Tokyopop, and has written RE:Play as an entirely new series for release.

== Bibliography ==
- Zombie King
  (2002–2003, 3 issues, in Amerimanga Anthology, Studio Ironcat)
- "Doors"
  (2004, short story, Rising Stars of Manga volume 3, Tokyopop)
- Next Exit
  (2004–2006, manga series, ten periodicals, Slave Labor Graphics)
- RE:Play
  (2006–2010, graphic novel series, 3 volumes, Tokyopop)
- Samurai Host Club
  (ongoing webcomic)
- Dire Hearts (ongoing webcomic, Sparkler Monthly)
