= Comix-ART =

Russian comics imprint

- Industry: publication
- Genre: manga, graphic novels, original English-language manga, manhwa
- Founded: 2008
- Headquarters: Saint Petersburg, Russia
- Number of locations: 1
- Area served: Commonwealth of Independent States
- Website: http://www.comix-art.ru

Comix-ART (Russian: Комикс-Арт, Komiks-Art) is a comics imprint of Russian book publisher Domino. It serves as a translator and the licensor of graphic novels, manga, manhwa and original English-language manga. Comix-ART, founded in 2008 with headquarters in Saint Petersburg, releases its titles in collaboration with Eksmo, another publishing house, and their books are published under "Eksmo" label. They do not reverse the pages (so called "flopping").

Comix-ART has been repeatedly criticized for the choice of fonts used to display letters inside the word balloons and for the placing of words in bubbles. AniMag editor commented on their publication of Naruto that a reader cannot distinguish some letters "without a magnifying glass".

== Licenses ==
=== Manga ===
- Bleach (1st volume released 2008-12-09) 11/44+
- Naruto (1st volume released 2008-11-28) 17/50+
- Death Note (1st volume released 2008-10-13) 10/12
- Princess Ai
- Doors of Chaos
- Yato no Kamitsukai 7/12
- Gravitation 2/12
- Red Garden 4/4
- Case File
- Category: Freaks 4/4
- Drug-On 5/5
- Dragon Ball 8/42
- C-R-O-S-S 3/3
- Shinshoku Kiss 2/2
- Made in Heaven 2/2
- Fruits Basket 4/23
- Berserk 6/35+
- Angel Sanctuary 3/20
- Claymore 10/18+
- Kyoko Karasuma no Jikenbo - 8/9+
- Hellsing 3/10
- Trigun 2/2
- Trigun Maximum
- Vampire Knight 8/15+
- Skip Beat! 3/25+
- Trinity Blood
- Blood + 5/5
- X 6/18
- One Piece
- Fullmetal Alchemist

=== Manhwa ===
- Devil's Bride

=== OEL manga ===
- Warcraft: The Sunwell Trilogy
- StarCraft
- Shutterbox
- Bizenghast
- Van Von Hunter
- The Dreaming
- Dark Metro (1st volume released 2008-12-19)
- Nightschool

=== Comic books ===
- The Sandman by Neil Gaiman.
- Lucifer by Mike Carey.

=== Graphic novels ===
- Artemis Fowl: The Graphic Novel
- World of Warcraft

== Criticism and reviews ==
AniMag has repeatedly criticized the font choices used by the publisher in manga releases. In Princess Ai, a reviewer noted that the font "starts to get seriously annoying, as instead of reading 'Ai', you keep seeing 'Di'". Regarding the Naruto edition, reviewers commented: "Far from the best choice, when without a magnifying glass it's impossible to distinguish 'A' from 'D' and 'Ts' from 'I'". Manga fans also pointed out translation errors, particularly in dialogues and character names in Naruto. The use of the Polivanov system for transliterating names and titles was also criticized, and the overall translation of the early volumes of Death Note and Naruto caused a wave of discontent among fans.

In contrast, a reviewer from Animemaniacs Magazine gave a positive assessment of the Death Note release:

"The manga was translated with good literary language, conveying the mood and personalities of the characters. The difference from the fan-made scans available online became obvious from the very first pages."

The reviewer also appreciated the print quality and good paper. Overall, he wrote, "the work of domestic publishers leaves a very positive impression thanks to its thoroughness and attention to detail."

The appearance of the licensed Naruto edition after Death Note was seen as logical:"Unlike the ten-thousand-copy Death Note, the potential readership of Naruto is much wider due to a younger audience already introduced to the series through the Jetix TV broadcast". The Animemaniacs Magazine reviewer had no complaints about the physical quality of the edition but criticized the translation. He remarked that if he were in Eksmo's place, he would have "listened to the opinions of people who have been working with manga online for years"—meaning scanlators. In the case of Bleach, there were deviations from the Polivanov system in name translations. However, the text, in the magazine's view, "is translated significantly better than Naruto." Readers raised concerns about word placement in speech bubbles, excessive hyphenation, and amusing factual errors, such as confusion over character birth dates.
