= Dark Metro =

Japanese manga series

- Cover of the first Japanese volume

ダークメトロ (Dāku Metoro)
- Genre: Horror
- Manga
- Written by: Tokyo Calen
- Illustrated by: Yoshiken
- Published by: SB Creative
- English publisher: NA: Tokyopop
- Original run: February 12, 2008 – August 12, 2008
- Volumes: 3

Dark Metro (Japanese: ダークメトロ, Hepburn: Dāku Metoro) is a horror manga written by Tokyo Calen and illustrated by Yoshiken.

== Release ==
Tokyopop published two volumes of Dark Metro in North America from February 12, 2008, to August 12, 2008. It is also published in Russia by Comix-ART, and in Brazil by NewPOP Editora.

== Reception ==
Writing for PopCultureShock, Katherine Dacey stated: "In less capable hands, this material would be horribly dull or laughably familiar, yet Tokyo Calen and Yoshiken manage to produce a surprisingly tight, entertaining package with briskly paced stories and clean, unfussy layouts that strike a good balance between atmosphere and ick." IGN's A. E. Sparrow described the art as "very similar" to Takeshi Obata's Death Note and enjoyed the entertaining short stories, listing it as an Editors' Choice. Nadia Oxford of Mania Entertainment commented that "Dark Metro dives pretty heavily into the B-movie stuff" with "not much substance to be had", and compared it to Hell Girl.
