= Wes Abbott =

American letterer

- Born: 10/11/1971
- Areas: Writer, Artist, Letterer

Wes Abbott (born October 11, 1971) is an artist who has worked as a letterer in comic books.

== Biography ==
As well as being chiefly a letterer, Abbott was also the head artist for the cancelled Coheed and Cambria comic book series, The Bag On Line Adventures.

Most recently, he wrote and drew Dogby Walks Alone for Tokyopop after winning the second Rising Stars of Manga competition.

== Bibliography ==
Comics work includes:

- Marvel Knights: Double Shot #2
  - "Nick's World"
- Robotech: Return to Macross #13 (writer, Academy Comics, 1994)
- Dogby Walks Alone (script and art, Tokyopop):
  - "Dogby Walks Alone" (in Rising Stars of Manga #2, 2003)
  - Volume 1 (192, June 2006, ISBN 1-59816-582-8)
  - Volume 2 (192, January 2008, ISBN 1-59816-583-6)
- A God Somewhere (Letterer, Wildstorm, 2010)

== Sources ==
- Wes Abbott at the Comic Book DB (archived from the original)
