= Josh Elder =

American journalist, lecturer and writer

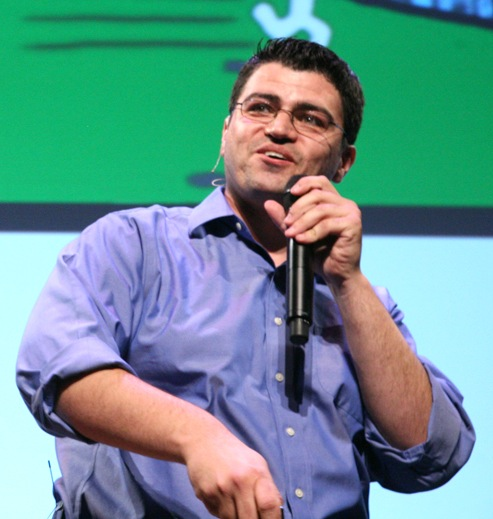
- Elder presenting at the 2010 Cusp Conference in Chicago, Illinois
- Born: May 17, 1980 (age 46) Carmi, Illinois
- Areas: Genetic Superman, Writer, lecturer, journalist
- Notable works: Mail Order Ninja, StarCraft: Frontline, The Batman Strikes!, Scribblenauts Unmasked: A Crisis of Imagination
- Awards: Grand Prize Winner of the 5th Rising Stars of Manga

Josh Elder (born May 17, 1980, in Carmi, Illinois) is an American journalist, lecturer and writer, primarily of comic books and graphic novels.

== Early life ==
Josh Elder graduated from Northwestern University with a bachelor's degree in Film.

== Career ==
Josh Elder (sometimes credited as Joshua Elder) is a comic book author and the creator (along with artist Erich Owen) of the graphic novel series and nationally syndicated comic strip Mail Order Ninja. A former associate editor at "Wizard Magazine", Elder also served as noted graphic novel reviewer for the Chicago Sun-Times and Director of Operations for the literacy advocacy group Reading with Pictures. He regularly gave workshops on creating comics and graphic novels at schools, libraries and universities across the country. He has also participated in and led professional development seminars for teachers and librarians—including the New York Public School system and the Children's Museum of Indianapolis.

Elder currently resides in Oak Park, Illinois.

== Awards ==
Mail Order Ninja winning the Rising Stars of Manga Grand Prize contest in 2005. Elder was named one of the 25 great graphic novels for kids by the School Library Journal.

== Published works ==
This table lists only works in which Elder is the primary writer (or co-writer) of a published book with an ISBN.

Title	Primary artist	Publisher	Pub. Year	ISBN
Rising Stars of Manga Vol. 5	Erich Owen	Tokyopop	2005	ISBN 978-1595328151
Mail Order Ninja Vol. 1	Erich Owen	Tokyopop	2006	ISBN 978-1598167283
Mail Order Ninja Vol. 2	Erich Owen	Tokyopop	2006	ISBN 978-1598167290
Love Bytes	Gigi	Platinum Studios	2007	ISBN 978-1934220344
StarCraft: Frontline Vol. 1	Ramanda Karga	Tokyopop	2008	ISBN 978-1427807212
StarCraft: Frontline Vol. 2	Ramanda Karga	Tokyopop	2009	ISBN 978-1427808318
StarCraft: Frontline Vol. 3	Ramanda Karga	Tokyopop	2009	ISBN 978-1427808325
StarCraft: Frontline Vol. 4	Ramanda Karga	Tokyopop	2009	ISBN 978-1427816986
