= Doors of Chaos =

Japanese manga series

- The first English volume of Doors of Chaos, published by Tokyopop on February 12, 2008

グレンツェン・テューア (Grenzen Tur)
- Genre: Fantasy
- Manga
- Written by: Ryoko Mitsuki
- Published by: SoftBank Creative
- English publisher: NA: Tokyopop
- Original run: June 30, 2008 – February 2, 2009
- Volumes: 3

Doors of Chaos (グレンツェン・テューア, Gurenshen Tyūa; from German: Grenzen Tür, "Doors of the Border") is a manga written and illustrated by Ryoko Mitsuki. The manga's first tankōbon volume was released by SoftBank Creative on June 30, 2008. It was licensed in North America by Tokyopop.

== Plot ==
Twin sisters Mizeria and Clarissa Rezelput are Harmonizers, able to manipulate the harmonies that exist in all living things. Confined to a locked garden, they have been raised by their guardian Rikhter Eintetta, trained and guided by his nurturing hand. The girls eagerly await their 16th birthday, practicing for their coming of age ceremony, when they will finally be recognized as true Harmonizers. With the passing of the ceremony, they will also gain new freedoms, and finally be able to leave their garden. However, when dark forces interfere during the ceremony, not only are Mizeria's dreams of freedom destroyed and her sister kidnapped by turned-traitor Rikhter - the fate of the entire world is now at stake.

== Release ==
Three manga volumes of Doors of Chaos were originally released in Japan. The first was released on June 30, 2008, and concluded with the third volume that was released on February 2, 2009. Tokyopop released the first two volumes in North America before the title was dropped. The manga was also licensed in France by Soleil, in Finland by Pauna Media Group, in Hungary as A káosz kapui by Mangattack, in Czech Republic as Dveře chaosu by Zoner Press in Russia as Двери Хаоса by Eksmo & Comix-ART, and in Brazil by NewPop.

== Reception ==
IGN's A.E. Sparrow criticizes the manga for occasionally using modern language, which doesn't fit the time period of the manga. Pop Culture Shock's Katherine Dacey criticizes the artist for putting too much detail into the manga's artwork. Pop Syndicate's Amanda Rush commended the manga for its "beautiful" artwork.
