= Scribblenauts Unmasked: A Crisis of Imagination =

American comic book series

- Cover art of Scribblenauts Unmasked: A DC Comics Adventure, a collection featuring all 9 issues from A Crisis of Imagination.

Publication information
- Publisher: DC Comics
- Schedule: Monthly
- Format: Limited series
- Genre: Adventure
- Publication date: December 2013 – September 2014
- No. of issues: 9 (Note: 10, if counting the Scribblenauts Unmasked: A DC Comics Adventure collection. 11, if also counting Scribblenauts Unmasked: A Battle Most Bizarre.)

Creative team
- Written by: Josh Elder
- Artist(s): Adam Archer; Ben Bates
- Letterer(s): Saida Temofonte
- Colorist(s): Ian Herring

Scribblenauts Unmasked: A Crisis of Imagination is a limited comic book series written by Josh Elder and illustrated by Adam Archer and Ben Bates. The limited series is based on the fifth installment in 5th Cell's Scribblenauts video game series, Scribblenauts Unmasked: A DC Comics Adventure. Starting in December 2013 and ending in September 2014, 9 issues of the series were released.

A one-shot comic was also bundled with Scribblenauts Unmasked: A DC Comics Adventure, titled Scribblenauts Unmasked: A Battle Most Bizarre. The one-shot was also written by Elder and illustrated by Archer.

== Plot summary ==
The series takes place in the DC Universe and follows Scribblenauts characters Maxwell and Lily, and features numerous DC Comics characters. The series' main antagonist is Madame Xanadu, who has plotted a plan to "demise" the Justice League. Throughout the series, Maxwell and Lily travel to multiple locations in the DC Universe, including Metropolis, the Justice League Watchtower, and the Phantom Zone.

== History ==
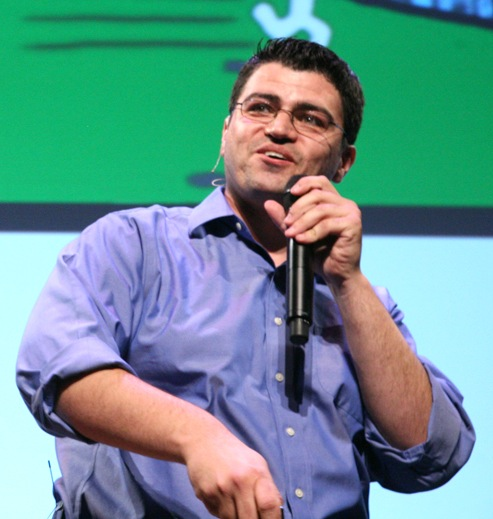
Writer Josh Elder at the Cusp Conference in 2010.

After Josh Elder sold the script of the Adventures of Superman anthology to script editor Alex Antone, Antone told Elder to pitch a one-shot comic that was to be bundled with Scribblenauts Unmasked: A DC Comics Adventure, titled Scribblenauts Unmasked: A Battle Most Bizarre. Prior to the one-shot's pitch, Elder had never played a Scribblenauts game. After installing and playing Scribblenauts Remix on his iPad, Elder "fell in love [with the game] pretty much immediately". Following A Battle Most Bizarre's release, some of DC Comics' other comic titles received alternate cover art featuring Scribblenauts characters. Scribblenauts Unmasked: A DC Comics Adventure was first released on September 23, 2013, and, as planned, was bundled with A Battle Most Bizarre.

After the one-shot's pitch, Antone told Elder to pitch a limited comic series also based on Scribblenauts, which became A Crisis of Imagination. Elder told American news website IGN that due to his prior work on StarCraft: Frontline and Mail Order Ninja, A Crisis of Imagination was in his "comfort zone". Elder also stated that the biggest issue with writing the comic was trying to "balanc[e] the different tones and 'reality rules'" of Scribblenauts and DC Comics. In 2013, Elder told the Canadian comic book-focused website Comic Book Resources that he actively played Remix and Unmasked: A DC Comics Adventure to keep himself "immersed in the unique feel of [the game's] world".

Release timeline
| 2013 | A Battle Most Bizarre (September); Issue #1 (December) |
| 2014 | Issue #2 (February); Issue #3 (March); Issue #4 (April); Issue #5 (May); Issue #6 (June); Issue #7 (July); Issue #8 (August); Issue #9 (September) |
| 2015 | Collection (February) |

The first issue of A Crisis of Imagination was released in early December 2013 and the last was released in mid-September 2014. A collection featuring all 9 issues was released in February 2015.

== Reception ==
Doug Zawisza of Comic Book Resources described A Crisis of Imagination's art style as being "akin to Fisher Price Little People and Art Baltazar drawings, but with a little bit more fluidity to their movements and gestures". Zawisza also noted that the series' first issue was a "nice addition to [that] week's comic book offerings". Brigid Alverson, also writing for Comic Book Resources, compared the Scribblenauts series to comic books and, as such, thought it was logical, although "circular", for a comic book spin-off of the series to be launched. Jesse Schedeen, writing for IGN, described the series' world as "cutesy".

Jay Yaws of Batman-News gave the comic's 9th issue a score of 5/10. Yaws described the issue's comedy as being "corny, cliche", and, at times, "almost lazy". Yaws was happy that the comic ended on a "note of finality", as it did not "leave any threads open" for a potential sequel. Yaws, although not a fan of Elder's writing, commended and respected him for "containing [the] miniseries to itself". Yaws found the art style "serviceable", but not amazing; he stated that the easter eggs hidden in the comics could make him occasionally "chuckle". Ultimately, Yaws described the 9th issue as a "cash-in" with a "definitive ending".
