= King of RPGs =

American graphic novel

- Date: 2010
- Publisher: Del Rey

Creative team
- Writers: Jason Thompson
- Artists: Victor Hao

Original publication
- Language: English
- ISBN: 978-0345513595

King of RPGs is an American graphic novel about roleplaying written by Jason Thompson and drawn by Victor Hao.

== Development ==
Thompson first submitted the idea to Tokyopop's Rising Stars of Manga contest in 2004, and was inspired by Hikaru no Go and Knights of the Dinner Table.

Hao's artistic influences are Dragon Ball, Slam Dunk, and role-playing video games from the Super NES era.

== Reception ==
Carlo Santos, writing for Anime News Network, enjoyed the writing and "passion" that Thompson brought to the work, and the diversity of the characters. Melinda Beasi felt the characters, while over-the-top, were "grounded in just enough reality to ring true". Joanna Draper Carlson compared the graphic novel with Penny Arcade and found the “zany adventure” plot "didn't work for [her]". Carlson felt that there was too much tone being used in the art and that the layout was confusing. Michael Lorah felt that if he was a fan of RPGs, he would understand the book better, but enjoyed the "enthusiasm" of the work. He found the art confusing, especially when characters are reacting with extreme emotion. Nick Smith, writing for ICv2, opined that it "isn't always funny" when "relatively innocent individuals" are hurt as part of the story, but praised Victor Hao's art.
