= Mark of the Succubus =

2005 manga by Irene Flores and Ashly Raiti

- Cover of Mark of the Succubus vol. 1 (2005), art by Irene Flores
- Genre: Horror, romance
- Author: Ashly Raiti
- Illustrator: Irene Flores
- Publisher: (Australia) (New Zealand) Madman Entertainment (Canada) (United States) Tokyopop
- Other publishers: (Finland) Pauna Media Group
- Original run: 2005
- Volumes: 3

Mark of the Succubus is an original English-language manga created by Tokyopop's Rising Stars of Manga 3 runner-up winners, Irene Flores and Ashly Raiti. The first volume became available in October 2005, the second was released in November 2006, and the third was released in July 2008.

== Synopsis ==
Mark of the Succubus revolves around Aiden Landis, a normal 17-year-old boy, mild-tempered and indecisive, who is never certain about what he wants. His father wants him to become a lawyer while his girlfriend wants him to change for her own social desires. His teachers are all convinced that he could be a top student if he would only stop daydreaming. Aiden just wants to play his guitar and, perhaps, write a meaningful song. Then he meets Maeve, a succubus-in-training.

Maeve is a young succubus who has not yet gotten her license. She goes down to the human world nervously, enthralled by all she sees there—especially art and a certain teenaged human named Aiden Landis, who seems just as infatuated with her as she is with him. Maeve soon meets Aiden's quirky best friend, Devin, and his snobby, superficial girlfriend, Sandra, and learns about the wonders and perils of the human world.

However, things may not go as smoothly as planned for Maeve. There is a demon on her tail who will do anything in her power to catch Maeve breaking the rules of the demonworld, all in order to increase her own wealth and social status. What is more, Maeve must decide whom to place her deadly Mark upon—the Mark that inhabits the body of the first human she will kill.

She is not sure how to dress, or talk, or act around humans, and she is not sure that she wants to seduce and kill one. That could prove a difficulty for her, as that is exactly the reason that she was sent to mingle with humans in the first place. And when she ends up falling in love with the same mortal that she has placed her Mark on, sentencing him to die, only trouble can result from such a blatant breaking of demon law.

== Characters ==
Maeve

- Age: 17
- Hair: Black
- Eyes: Purple
- Classification: Succubus

Intent and studious, but a little absentminded, Maeve tends to stand out among demons and humans alike. Her quirky habits mark her as someone just learning the ways of a culture, and her utter inability to lie convincingly adds to the peculiar image. Despite her training, she often forgets what she is meant to be doing among the humans and loses herself in the fun of the moment.

Aiden Landis

- Age: 17
- Hair: Dark Brown
- Eyes: Green

Indecisive, mild-tempered, and a bit withdrawn, Aiden rarely protests when others make his decisions for him, drifint along in whateverdirection he is pushed with no real enthusiasm. Al he really wants to do is play guitar but only his best friend knows he is good at it: instead he puts a weak effort into things he does not truly care about, avoiding conflict at the expense of his own dreams.

Sandra

Veril

- Age: 965
- Hair: Auburn
- Eyes: Grey
- Classification: Incubus

For most, Veril is a walking paradox. He has no qualms about seducing and killing humans, blackmailing superiors, or playing dirty to get his own way. At the same time however he has a strong sense of justice, and is fiercely loyal to those very few that are close to him. When his peculiar sense of is added to the mix, the incubus often comes across as a puzzle that is nearly impossible to figure out. Veril is an older brother/father figure to Maeve, whom he took in as his own when she was an infant or toddler. He cares deeply for her and will go to extreme lengths to keep her safe.

Devin Wilshire

- Age: 17
- Hair: Blonde
- Eyes: Brown

Loud and intentionally obnoxious to anyone he does not like, Devin is considered an oddball, including by those closest to him. His love of science fiction and conspiracy theories has left more than one person wondering whether his far-fetched personal conjectures are real or just for fun.

Sylne

- Age: 1129
- Hair: Silver-Blue
- Eyes: Turquoise
- Classification: Succubus

Charming, intelligent, and collected, there is not much about Sylne not to like - on the surface, at least. Underneath, the woman's hand is always in some sort of scheme, and she is willing to sacrifice even those closest to her in an effort to gain more power. She is two-faced and underhanded, two very good things for a succubus to be. Desiring a certain title, and the power, fortune, and recognition that comes with it, Sylne placed an illegal Human Spell on the Imp, Junael, forcing him t spy on her old student, Maeve, expecting the girl's nature would cause the younger succubus to slip just enough to use for her own selfish purposes. Sylne is the top succubus in Erebus, a title she inherited from the prior top succubus (whose death Sylne arranged), and once had an intimate relationship with Veril but they grew apart.

Junael

- Age: 212
- Hair: Black
- Eyes: Reddish-Brown
- Classification: Imp
- Animal Form: Crow

Somewhat reserved, Junael is the sort who prefers to handle things behind the scenes. He is meticulously neat and pays close attention to detail; usually, he knows more about any given situation than he lets on. though his work requires him to make sure the rules are followed, he has found that knowing them well enough allows them to be bent when the time clls for it. He becomes a pawn of Sylne who places on him illegal Human Magic to control him, and he is forced to spy on Maeve, looking for any slip-ups or breaking the rules. He turns on Sylne and aids Maeve.

== Release ==
Written by Ashly Raiti and illustrated by Irene Flores, Mark of the Succubus was published by Tokyopop in three volumes from November 8, 2005, to July 9, 2008. Madman Entertainment distributes the series in Australia and New Zealand. The series is also licensed in Finland by Pauna Media Group.

=== Volume list ===
No.	Release date	ISBN
01	November 8, 2005	978-1-59816-266-0
Chapters 1—6
02	November 7, 2006	978-1-59816-267-7
03	July 9, 2008	978-1-59816-268-4
