= Pray for Japan =

- Film poster
- Directed by: Stu Levy
- Produced by: Stu Levy
- Music by: Shinya Mizoguchi
- Release date: 2012
- Running time: 97 minutes
- Country: Japan
- Language: Japanese

Pray for Japan is a 2012 Japanese documentary film about the 2011 Tōhoku earthquake and tsunami. Stu Levy produced and directed the film. All of the crew, including Levy, volunteered to make it, and all of the profits from it will be donated to the non-profit organization JEN for their Tōhoku reconstruction projects. The film premiered in Tokyo on March 6, 2012, and showed for one night only in 15 North American AMC Theatres on March 14, 2012.

The film moves between several perspectives, including survivors living in a shelter, a middle school staff, volunteers, and a young musician who lost several family members. A woman's voiceover reads poetry interspersed between these different perspectives. The overall effect is to show that despite the disaster, the survivors are moving forward with their recovery.

== Reception ==
Metacritic, which uses a weighted average, assigned the film a score of 53 out of 100, based on four critics, indicating "mixed or average" reviews.

Ernest Hardy of The Village Voice wrote, "Filmed over a period of six weeks and supplemented with animated music sequences and chilling news footage of the terrifying deluge, Pray is both an elegy and a love letter." Justin Chang of Variety wrote, "It's hard not to be moved by the words of love, gratitude and resilience spoken by earthquake/tsunami survivors and volunteers in Pray for Japan. But well-meaning platitudes go only so far in this sincerely felt, raggedly structured compilation of footage shot by producer-director Stu Levy while he was aiding victims in the devastated coastal city of Ishinomaki."
