= Dogby Walks Alone =

OEL Manga by Wes Abbot

- Cover of Dogby Walks Alone vol. 1 (2006), art by Wes Abbott
- Genre: Comedy, Hardboiled
- Author: Wes Abbott
- Publisher: Tokyopop (U.S.)
- Original run: 2006 – Present
- Volumes: 3

Dogby Walks Alone is an original English-language manga by Wes Abbott, and the name of Abbott's winning entry in the second Rising Stars of Manga. The Rising Stars of Manga entry was a 15-page prequel to the manga. Although the manga is primarily a comedy, it includes several scenes of serious, gripping drama, and the first volume's plot and theme are solidly based in noir fiction.

For the sake of clarity and brevity, this article refers to the original 15-page Rising Stars of Manga entry as "the short story" and the full-tankōbon graphic novels as "the books". Like almost all "original English-language manga", Dogby Walks Alone is "straight to tankōbon", and never had its individual chapters serialized in a magazine.

Dogby, the protagonist of both stories, is an amusement park mascot who never speaks, and never removes the head from his costume (at least not anywhere the "camera" can see). The actual narrative and dialogue of the short story and the first book come primarily through "Snack Girl", Dogby's "Watson" who also has a huge crush on him.

The second book in the series is subtitled "Dogby Walks Tall".

== Lead characters ==
None of the characters in Dogby Walks Alone have real names, with the exception of Roy Happy, the owner of "HappyPlace", the amusement park where the stories take place (a direct homage to Disneyland and Roy Disney). In the short story, the shift manager is named Berger, but when the same character reappears in the book he is only referred to as "Former Shift Manager (Retired)".

=== Characters from the short story ===
- Dogby: A man in a dog suit who never speaks or shows his face to the "camera". Very smart, very strong, and an accomplished fighter. In the short story, just before he knocks out Katty Kit, Snack Girl removes the body of Dogby's costume for him (leaving the head) to show that Dogby is "ripped". Dogby is the protagonist of both stories.
- Snack Girl: Dogby's sidekick and mouthpiece, who also has a huge crush on Dogby. She primarily provides the narrative of the story, and normally works at a concession stand, selling lemonade, churros, and other snacks.
- Birdie: A man in a pelican suit who drives the Jungle Cruise steamboat. Birdie is an old-timer who's been around "since Snack Girl used to visit the park as a kid", and who showed Dogby the ropes when he first started at the park.
- Princess: A girl in a thinly veiled Snow White costume who is sleeping her way to the top of HappyPlace. Had a brief relationship with Dogby, along with pretty much every other male member of the park staff.
- Katty Kit: A man in a cat suit who views himself as Dogby's rival but who Dogby and Snack Girl view as merely an annoyance.
- Shift Manager Berger: One of the park's shift managers, with glasses, a pompadour, and two left feet. In the book, Shift Manager Berger is named "Former Shift Manager (Retired)".
- Park Supervisor: An executive at the park who appears at the very end of the story.

=== Characters from the first book ===
The first book features all of the preceding characters, and adds several more.

- Roy Happy: The owner of the amusement park, whose face is always hidden from the camera. He keeps a white cat in his lap and does several other things that are direct homages to Ernst Stavro Blofeld, the nemesis of James Bond.
- Park Upper Management Guy: His name pretty much says it all, and is usually abbreviated in the story to P.U.M.G.
- New Shift Manager: A man in a cowboy hat and a puffy coat who started out at the park at the same time as Dogby and Princess. All three of them became friends while working together in the park's "Chinatoon" section.
- Queen Sunshine: A girl in a thinly veiled Cinderella costume. New Shift Manager's girlfriend.
- Head of Park Security: Wears a uniform reminiscent of M. Bison's, which is used to comical effect halfway through the manga.
- The Duchess: A girl whose costume appears to be modelled after Princess Leia. A friend of the Princess.
- Petey: The dog mascot of "Illusion Valley", the other amusement park in the area (a reference to Six Flags Magic Mountain). A shadowy figure whose true motives aren't entirely clear, but acts as a stronger nemesis for Dogby than Katty Kit did.

== Plot ==
The original 15-page story for Rising Stars of Manga 2 features Dogby and Snack Girl clearing Birdie of the theft of 20 pounds of hot dogs.

The two full volumes of the manga are each complete stories. In the first book, Dogby solves a murder, while the rest of the park is on the brink of civil war over the mysterious theft of a week's ticket sales. In the second book, Dogby helps defend an Alaskan town from a gang of Russian Imperialists.

== Release ==
=== Volume list ===
No.	North American release date	North American ISBN
01	June 13, 2006	978-1-59816-582-1
02	January 13, 2008	978-1-59816-583-8
