= Bizenghast =

Graphic novel series by M. Alice LeGrow

- Cover of the Finnish edition of Bizenghast vol. 1 (2005), art by M. Alice LeGrow
- Genre: Horror, psychological
- Author: M. Alice LeGrow
- Publisher: NA: Tokyopop
- Original run: 2005–2012
- Volumes: 8

Bizenghast is a debut gothic graphic novel series (Note: LeGrow considers Bizenghast to be a graphic novel series, while reviewers have categorized it as global manga.) written and illustrated by M. Alice LeGrow. The first seven volumes were published by Tokyopop, with the final volume released in late April 2012. After placing in Tokyopop's Rising Stars of Manga competition with her short story "Nikolai", LeGrow successfully pitched the series to Tokyopop's editors. She worked on the series from 2004 to 2011. Set in the haunted New England town of Bizenghast, the story follows Dinah, an orphaned teenager who is tasked with returning each night to an ancient mausoleum to free the ghosts within the building.

Several adaptations of Bizenghast have been released, including a novel by Shawn Thorgersen, animated episodes, and a tabletop roleplaying game. Critics praised Bizenghast for the gothic atmosphere and art, but noted the traditional elements and varying quality of the series.

== Plot ==
Set in the fictional New England town of the same name, Bizenghast focuses on fifteen-year-old Dinah Wherever. Her parents' car crash leaves her orphaned at a young age, and as a result, she moves in with her aunt. Dinah can see the ghosts which haunt her aunt's house, which was a hospital and later a boarding school; however, her aunt and doctor believe that she has schizophrenia. One day, she and her only friend, Vincent Monroe, sneak out of her aunt's house to search for materials for his garden. They stumble across an ancient mausoleum, and after Dinah reads aloud from a plaque, she discovers that her name is written on a contract which binds her to return to the mausoleum every night to free the ghosts. If she succeeds, she will win her freedom and a reward. If she fails, she will die and stay in the mausoleum as a corpse.

For every ten ghosts appeased, Dinah and Vincent get a tower guard to help with their task. Over the course of the series, they meet two of the guards: Edaniel, a grinning cat-like creature, and his brother Edrear, who secretly likes Dinah. Vincent dies while in one of the vaults, causing Dinah to become depressed. Later, the hooded angel, which normally guards the entrance to the mausoleum, appears as two stones that talk to Dinah and help her overcome the depression which resulted from Vincent's death.

Dinah continues searching the vaults and discovers that Edaniel and Edrear's sister, Eniri, is missing, and that the seed of the mausoleum—its link to the Host in the afterlife—has been stolen. Additionally, Edaniel and Edrear's other sister, Elala, is found dead. After Edaniel and Edrear lock down the mausoleum, they send Dinah home and she discovers that Maphohetka, a girl hanged for witchcraft and who now as a ghost can control minds in the real world, is manipulating Eniri and the townspeople. Unsuccessful in her attempt to stop her, Dinah flees to the mausoleum and receives a special outfit melted from the gold tolls that she and Vincent paid to gain access to the mausoleum. Returning, she confronts Maphohetka, who then orders Edaniel to kill her.

In the ensuing battle, Dinah faces off against her former friend, accidentally decapitating Edaniel in the process. An enraged Edrear attempts to kill her, but eventually halts when Dinah points out that he's crying for his brother, something that he's normally unable to do and that's being caused by Maphohetka's influence. Knowing that he's been compromised, Edrear stabs himself with his own sword, leaving Dinah to mourn him and share one kiss. Maphohetka, taking the opportunity, destroys Dinah's scythe (the only thing she had that could potentially kill her) and ends up mutating into a large monster. After Dinah is captured in Maphohetka's body, she happens upon the entity's core, which is Maphohetka's decayed corpse. Using Eniri's bracelet to see into the monster, she finds that a piece of the cross Maphohetka was stabbed with during her hanging is still lodged in her chest, allowing Dinah to conclude that the piece is what keeps the evil spirit anchored in the living world. Dinah removes the cross shard, causing Maphohetka to fade away.

Wanting to seek help, Dinah stabs herself with the crucifix piece, allowing her to temporarily ascend into the afterlife. There, she encounters her mother, who gives her another mausoleum seed that Dinah takes back to the living world. Dinah uses the seed to revive everyone killed in the incident and her armor melts into coins that flow out of the fountain. But in the end, Dinah opts to remove the crucifix piece, killing herself.

Dinah walks through her own funeral, bidding her mourning aunt goodbye before wandering outside. On the way, she encounters Vincent, but the two don't recognize each other until they find the hidden graveyard. Dinah and Vincent become two mausoleum guards alongside a revived Edaniel and Edrear (two young women who happened onto the graveyard having been contracted to the mausoleum). The series closes with Dinah on top of one of the towers beside Vincent, commenting how "she's starting to like this town."

== Development ==
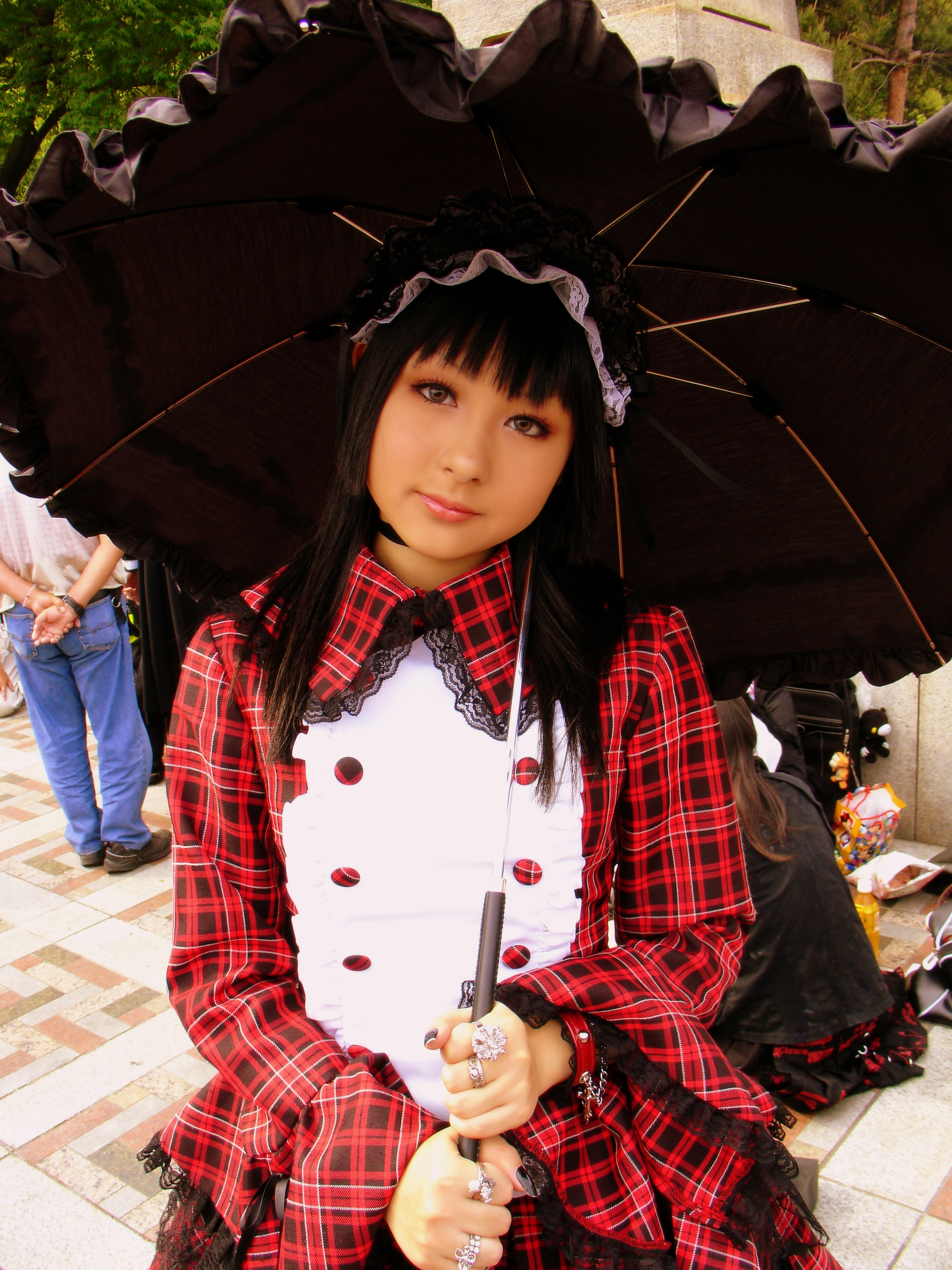
An example of Lolita fashion. LeGrow theorizes that her pacing, style, and drawings of characters and clothes styled after the Lolita fashion is why her work is categorized as manga.

As a young girl, Mary Alice LeGrow was not interested in comics since she grew up in Wiesbaden, Germany where comics were not readily available. In her freshman year of high school, she discovered comics and anime. She heard about Tokyopop's Rising Stars of Manga competition from a friend at the 2003 Otakon, an anime convention in Baltimore, Maryland; the short story LeGrow submitted won a runner-up place in the competition and was published in the 2003 Rising Stars of Manga anthology. She successfully pitched Bizenghast to the Tokyopop editors, and became the second Rising Stars of Manga winner to have an original series published by Tokyopop.

LeGrow worked on the series from 2004 to 2011. She began Bizenghast when, for an art class assignment, she drew an open door and added the hooded angel statue in another class. In her initial designs, Dinah had simple features and short black hair, and Vincent was one of Dinah's friends. LeGrow later removed the other friends from the story. She later lengthened Dinah's hair and depicted her dressed in Lolita fashion—clothing influenced by the Rococo and Victorian eras. Other changes included Dinah's hair being altered from straight to curly and the addition of an exoskeleton-like armour to Edrear. Tired of thin female characters in comics, LeGrow designed Edaniel's girlfriend, Nareesha as "super full-figured".

When deciding on names for her protagonist, LeGrow considered Molly, Charlotte, Moira, Sally, and Diana before choosing Dinah—a reference to the pet cat of the protagonist of Lewis Carroll's novel Alice in Wonderland; the 1984 comedy film Johnny Dangerously inspired her last name, Wherever. Vincent Monroe takes his name from Vincent Price and the actress Marilyn Monroe. Jane, Dinah's aunt, shares her name with LeGrow's sister. Edaniel takes his name from the name Daniel in a middle school yearbook which LeGrow picked at random; she noted that the editors let her keep him in the story although he appeared a risky character to them. Edrear was initially named Mordred after the character from Arthurian myths. The name of his sister Elala comes from the character Lala Orange of Rainbow Brite, an animated television series. The minor character Prince Ironbound takes his name from the city Ironbound, New Jersey, while Lalibela, a holy town in northern Ethiopia, inspired Bali Lali's. Another minor character, Dr. Morstan, takes his name from Mary Morstan, Dr. Watson's wife. "марионетка", the Russian word for marionette, inspired the name of the antagonist Maphohetka.

LeGrow comments that the series "is about life, death and fabulous outfits (not in that order)" and notes that there are "a lot of religious themes" present. The town of Bizenghast "represents a world cut off from that sort of constant access [of technology]." The series was initially written to span about fourteen volumes and be divided into three seasons: the first seven volumes would make up the first story arc; the second season, volumes eight through eleven, would center on the mausoleum's relationship with the other guilds; and season three would focus on the afterlife and consist of the last three volumes. LeGrow also considered writing a spin-off based on Bizenghast with a guest artist, after she finished the first story arc of Bizenghast. The spin-off would contain chapters not present in the original series, and after her other series was completed, she would continue Bizenghast. LeGrow concluded Bizenghast at eight volumes.

=== Minor controversy ===
A minor controversy occurred over a statement published in the July 2007 issue of the Tokyopop publication Takuhai and in the back of the first Bizenghast volume written by a former Tokyopop editor and not authorized by LeGrow. It read:

Meet M. Alice LeGrow, and please call her Marty. And while you're at it, call your best friend and tell her that if she's going to cosplay any of Marty's characters with you, both of you better do your research, or Marty's going to be pissed. Because that's Marty. She doesn't like sloppiness. Especially when it comes to anime and cosplay. She especially won't tolerate it if you're dressing up like Dinah from Bizenghast, because Dinah is her first big market character. Not only that, Dinah's fabulous. Do Dinah right, or don't Dinah at all. Understand?

LeGrow called it "worded in a way that I felt was offensive to me and to cosplayers" and noted that "none of it reflects my opinions." Fan reaction to learning that the statement was inaccurate was generally relief since "they felt it didn't mesh with [her] personality." She stated:

I love cosplayers and I'm flattered that anyone would cosplay my characters. I certainly wouldn't want to deter anyone from doing so...I'm very open to any kind of cosplay. I'm afraid the person who authored that piece felt they were doing me a favor and putting an edgy spin on my persona, but had I known about it prior to printing, I would have never allowed it to go into the book.

== Media ==
=== Graphic novels ===
Written and illustrated by M. Alice LeGrow, Bizenghast is published in North America by Tokyopop. As of July 2010, seven volumes have been released. The first was released on 9 August 2005; the most recent was published 1 July 2010. However, Tokyopop's North American branch stopped publishing on 31 May 2011; because of it, the final volume of the series is being released through a print-on-demand agreement with RightStuf.com. The series is also distributed in New Zealand and Australia by Madman Entertainment, in Hungary by Mangattack, in Germany by Tokyopop Germany, in Finland by Pauna Media Group, and in Russia by Comix-art.

=== Books ===
Three extra books based on Bizenghast have been released (eight in main series). On 13 February 2007, Tokyopop also released a 72-page limited-edition art book, Bizenghast: Falling into Fear (ISBN 978-1-59816-748-1), which included stickers and pinup pages. Running Press published a coloring book based on the series, Color Me Manga: Bizenghast (ISBN 978-0762431311) on 12 November 2007. On 13 August 2008, Tokyopop published a novel adaptation, Bizenghast: The Novel (ISBN 978-1-4278-1030-4), written by Shawn Thorgersen and with illustrations by LeGrow.

=== Other ===
Menfond Electronic Art adapted Bizenghast into animated short episodes or "iManga". The iManga episodes featured music by Divine Madness and Kissing Violet, and premiered on My Space in summer 2007. Overall, LeGrow praised the adaptation. She liked the "kooky" background effects and Edaniel's voice actor, but disliked Dinah's "high-pitched" voice which she had imagined as "deeper...with a slight edge to it. Sort of like Mandy from The Grim Adventures of Billy & Mandy, but without the sarcasm." The episodes were also available on Verizon's V CAST. The television network iaTV acquired the seventeen two- to three-minute-long episodes as part of a "program acquisition deal and strategic ad sales partnership with Tokyopop."

A tabletop roleplaying game based on the series was created by Clint Krause. Other merchandise included posters, scarves, playing cards, a plushie, postcards, a signed puzzle kit, and T-shirts. Additionally, a two-and-a-half-hour DVD commentary about the first Bizenghast volume, with Tokyopop editor interviews and bonus material, was planned to be released in mid-August 2010.

== Reception ==
Bizenghast was well received by English-language readers. The first volume debuted at the 79th spot on a list of the top 100 best-selling graphic novels of August 2005 with an estimated 1,434 copies sold. Daily Variety named Bizenghast one of Tokyopop's top ten biggest titles. In June 2010, the seventh volume sold 425 copies, ranking 294th on the list of the top 300 best-selling graphic novels.

Bizenghast received positive reviews from critics. The September 2005 issue of Teen People listed Bizenghast as the Hot Book of the Month. Sheena McNeil of Sequential Tart praised the first volume as "a highly enjoyable read". Coolstreak Cartoons's Leroy Douresseaux described the series as "belong[ing] to a fantasy subgenre sometimes referred to as 'pop Gothic'" and relying on atmosphere and looks. Critics praised the art of Bizenghast as detailed, but did not see it as manga-styled. Anime Jump's Chad Clayton called the series "heavily steeped in the gothic tradition" and commented that the series "successfully develops an inventive visual style all its own. It seems to owe more to classical art, gothic comics, and even artists like Edward Gorey than it does to manga." Johanna Draper Carlson, a longtime reviewer for Publishers Weekly, found the art reminiscent "of classic fantasy indy comics" and noted "stock elements" in the story. Reviewers found Dinah's character design "striking" and with the potential to appeal to fans of the Gothic Lolita fashion. Criticism focused on the writing, "uneven pacing", flat characters, and the varying quality of the art. Anime News Network's Zac Bertschy heavily criticized Bizenghast for the "slightly modified generic monster-of-the-week cliché" plot, one-dimensional characters, and art. David Welsh compared Bizenghast to "a cosplay of a horror manga", and wrote: "It's got a handle on the cosmetics, but central elements of story and character are vague and underdeveloped."

In his review of the novel adaptation, Mania Entertainment's Greg Hackmann disliked the large amount of description, the "inconsistent" narration, and felt that the novel was more of a "novelization in the most literal sense of the word, reading much less like an adaptation in the spirit of LeGrow's work than a 1-to-1 copy of the source material." Conversely, Sabrina Fritz wrote that the novel adaptation was "well-written, [and] engaging" and called it "one of the best light novels on the market". Another reviewer for Mania Entertainment, Danielle Van Gorder, enjoyed "[t]he detail and perspective in the architectural drawings" and "incredibly detailed costumes" of the art book Falling into Fear.
