= Made in Heaven (manga) =

2007 manga by Ami Sakurai

- Genre: Drama, Romance
- Manga
- Written by: Ami Sakurai, Yukari Yashiki
- Illustrated by: Yukari Yashiki
- Published by: Gentosha
- English publisher: AUS: Madman Entertainment; NA: Tokyopop
- Imprint: Birz Comics Special
- Published: February 9, 2007
- Volumes: 2

Made in Heaven is a 2-volume manga by Ami Sakurai, published by Gentosha in 2007. It is licensed in North America by Tokyopop (who released it in two parts) and in Australia and New Zealand by Madman Entertainment.

== Story ==
The manga follows the story of a young man named Kazemichi who is given prosthetics after a horrendous accident almost takes his life. These prosthetics give him a new lease on life but also extract a terrible price: his heart becomes unstable and remains in danger of failing any time. Faced with this predicament, Kazemichi suddenly meets a young woman name Juri, whose love gives him the peace he needs in his soul, as well as the courage to face the fate that comes closer every second.

== Staff ==
Japanese

- Story and art:Yukari Yashiki
- Story:Ami Sakurai
- Publisher: Asuka Comics
