= RE:Play =

Original English-language manga created by Christy Lijewski

- Cover of RE:Play vol. 1 (2006), art by Christy Lijewski
- Genre: Romantic fantasy
- Author: Christy Lijewski
- Publisher: (Australia) (New Zealand) Madman Entertainment (Canada) (United States) Tokyopop
- Original run: 2006–2010
- Volumes: 3

RE:Play is an original English-language manga created by Christy Lijewski. The first volume of RE:Play was released August 8, 2006. The second volume was released March 11, 2008. There are three volumes planned.

== Characters ==
=== Faust ===
- Cree Winters: The band's vocalist and one of the founders. She is the daughter of Maria Winters, a famous singer who died in a plane crash when Cree was a child. Cree feels guilty because before her mother left, Cree told her mother not to come back. She found Izsak on the streets in chapter one of book one, and seemed to have been enchanted by his somber song, this is also because she is a bit sensitive when it comes to music written by her mother. She backed up Izsak when they first met Rail and she is what put him into Faust. And for some reason has a slight crush on Izsak.
- Izsak: A man Cree found in the subway playing a bass guitar. She convinced him to be the band's bass guitarist. He seems to only remember his recent past. He has an incurable but non-fatal blood disorder from birth. In order to combat this he would frequent an establishment that dealt in black market blood transfusion. He seems to be a somber loner, but as he begins to meet up with Faust, he takes a liking and seems to attach. He is usually willing to do things, and despite his gruesome past that comes up frequently, he is quite positive. And with the guitar Cree gave him, he adores Cree.
- Rail Kainer: The other founder of Faust and the guitarist. He was born in Hamburg, Germany, and his father spoke German to him. Cree's friend and older brother figure. His parents took her in after she was orphaned. Rail resented her because he was used to being an only child. After a talk with his father, he promised to that he would not let anyone make Cree cry. Rail is talented and athletic. He has a major in physics and was 10 points away from getting a perfect score on the SAT. He can play the violin and the cello. He was the captain of his high school swim team. It was actually while he was on the swim team that he first met Char, protecting him from a pair of "damn homophobes" in the boys' locker room (Char wrote in his diary about how "totally hot" Rail was later that day). Rail has several bad habits, including snoring.
- Charles "Char" Delphi: The band's drummer and fashion designer. Her taste and Rail's taste often come into conflict. Char also seems to have something for Izsak (as in the first meetings she was seeming to flirt around him), and possibly still has feelings for Rail. She is the only member of "Faust" who does not have facial piercings. She is Ed's twin, and they have moles on the opposite sides of their faces. She is revealed to be born male; at Lejiewski's art blog she hints at it, Edward refers to Char as his "Brother", stating that Char is "no more of a girl" than he is, she is seen as a boy in a flashback in the second volume, and it is revealed in the profiles that her whole name is actually Charles.

=== Mephisto ===
- Ed Delphi: The bassist that left the band and joined Mephisto. He used to date Cree and is Char's twin. Also the one who was mad at Cree for giving his guitar away to Izsak.

=== Other ===
- Niji: A woman stalking Izsak and Laurent's superior. Her parents were killed by a vampire who appears to be Laurent. She is a "court member". She is also shown to have a romantic relationship with Laurent. Because of this she is often thought of as a shotacon within her organization, but she really hates children.
- Laurent: Niji's subordinate. He appears young, but can shapeshift into a more mature form. He has black wings that can also function as limbs. He can fly without using his wings. He is also shown to have some conflict with members of Iszak's "clan", though what this clan is has not yet been revealed. He also bears a striking resemblance to Niji's boss.

== Release ==
Written and illustrated by Christy Lijewski, Re:Play was published in North America by Tokyopop, who released the series in three volumes from August 8, 2006, to January 1, 2010.Madman Entertainment publishes the series in Australia and New Zealand.

=== Volume list ===
No.	North American release date	North American ISBN
01	August 8, 2006	978-1-59816-737-5
02	March 11, 2008	978-1-59816-738-2
03	January 1, 2010	978-1-59816-739-9
