= M. Alice LeGrow =

Alternative comics artist, writer, and costume designer

- Born: Mary Alice LeGrow; 1981 (age 44–45); Kansas, United States
- Education: Savannah College of Art and Design (BFA)
- Occupations: Alternative comics artist, costume designer (Note: Her biography in Rising Stars of Manga lists her as an artist and a costume designer. In 2009, she designed and sewed the costumes for a wedding-themed photoshoot for the spring 2009 issue of the English-language Gothic & Lolita Bible, with the exception of two pieces brought by the other two models. She also modelled one of her costumes, and designed the set. In 2011, she worked as an assistant costume designer at the haunted house event Terror Behind the Walls at Eastern State Penitentiary in Philadelphia.)
- Years active: 2003—present
- Notable work: Bizenghast
- Website: bizenghast.com

Mary Alice "Marty" LeGrow (born 1981 in Kansas, United States), better known by her pen name M. Alice LeGrow, is an American alternative comics artist, best known for her gothic, dark fantasy graphic novel series Bizenghast.

Her 2003 short story "Nickolai", about a grieving only child and the ghost she befriends, won a runner-up place in publisher Tokyopop's Rising Stars of Manga competition. She successfully pitched Bizenghast to the Tokyopop editors, and worked on the eight-volume series from 2004 to 2011. Set in the eponymous New England town, it focuses on an orphan who finds herself tasked with returning each night to a mausoleum and appeasing the ghosts within it. Published from 2005 to 2012, Bizenghast has been translated into twelve languages and received praise and criticism from reviewers.

== Early life ==
Mary Alice LeGrow attended Savannah College of Art and Design, from which she graduated in 2003 with a Bachelor of Fine Arts in Sequential Art in 2003. Her artistic style was influenced by Kenji Tsuruta, Gustave Doré, Aubrey Beardsley, Will Eisner, and Japanese manga.

At the 2003 Otakon, an anime convention in Baltimore, Maryland, LeGrow heard about Tokyopop's Rising Stars of Manga competition. She entered a short piece entitled "Nikolai" in the contest, won a runner-up place in the competition and appeared in the 2003 Rising Stars of Manga comic anthology. This was the introduction of her work to the publisher TOKYOPOP.

== Career ==
Following the successful pitch of her gothic, dark fantasy graphic novel series Bizenghast (Note: LeGrow considers Bizenghast to be a graphic novel series, while reviewers have categorized it as global manga.) to the editors at Tokyopop, she began work on the series in 2004 and completed the final, eighth volume in 2011. Set in the eponymous New England town, it centers on Dinah Wherever, a schizophrenic orphan, and her only friend Vincent Monroe. Dinah finds herself tasked with returning each night to a mausoleum and appeasing the ghosts within.

LeGrow described Bizenghast as "about life, death and fabulous outfits (not in that order)", and notes the presence of religious themes.

Tokyopop published the first seven volumes of Bizenghast from 2005 to 2010, with the final volume published in July 2012 through an agreement with Right Stuf. Additionally, the series is distributed in New Zealand and Australia by Madman Entertainment, and has been translated into twelve languages, among them Hungarian, German, and Finnish. Bizenghast received praise and criticism from reviewers. The September 2005 issue of Teen People listed Bizenghast as the Hot Book of the Month. Sheena McNeil of Sequential Tart praised the first volume as "a highly enjoyable read". IGN's KJB praised it as "one of the most interesting manga to come alone in some time". In contrast, Anime News Network's Zac Bertschy considered it "one of the weaker entries in Tokyopop's fledgling OEL manga line". David Welsh wrote: "It's got a handle on the cosmetics, but central elements of story and character are vague and underdeveloped."

In 2012, LeGrow announced a Kickstarter project for a self-published graphic novel series titled The Elephant Book, which she described as "about the power of human imagination and invention." According to LeGrow, her project has received a favorable response. Set in Philadelphia, Pennsylvania, The Elephant Book focuses on Williams and Fairfax, who find themselves caught between two rival organizations: Artifex and the Free Will Society.

In 2021, LeGrow published the horror comic Stagtown on the digital platform Webtoon, under the pen name Punko. Stagtown follows the story of Frankie, Jeremy and Felix as they discover something is terribly wrong in the town of Stagtown, and attempt to escape the horrors that the residents spend every day ignoring. The series proved popular among the horror fanbase, spanning two seasons between 2021 and 2023.

LeGrow's online comic Cinderella Boy was optioned for publication and launched on Webtoon in November 2023. The series is currently ongoing.

== Artistic reception ==
Reviewers have discussed her artistic style. Johanna Draper Carlson, a reviewer for Publishers Weekly, described LeGrow's art as reminiscent of those of "some classic fantasy indy comics, perhaps (for example) the work of Teri Sue Wood." In a review of the first volume of Bizenghast, another reviewer for Publishers Weekly wrote that LeGrow drew her backgrounds in the style of German expressionism. In her review of the Bizenghast artbook, Mania Entertainment's Danielle Van Gorder noted LeGrow's range of styles spanning "from a little bit gothic and a little bit grotesque to detailed work that pays homage to antique woodcuts."

== Bibliography ==
Graphic novels & short stories

- "Nikolai"
  (2003, short story, Rising Stars of Manga volume 2, Tokyopop, ISBN 978-1-59182-536-4)
- Bizenghast
  (2005–2012, graphic novel series, Tokyopop, 8 volumes)
- The Poison Apple Book of Stories
  (2010, self-published mini-comic)
- Red Dart, silver-prize winner in the Line Webtoon BRAIN short-story contest.

Illustrations

- Bizenghast: Falling into Fear
  (2007, artbook, Tokyopop, ISBN 978-1-59816-748-1)
- Color Me Manga: Bizenghast
  (2007, coloring book, Running Press, ISBN 978-0762431311)
- Bizenghast: The Novel
  (2008, light novel, Tokyopop, ISBN 978-1-4278-1030-4)
- Stagtown a web comic, spiritual successor to Bizenghast.
- Cinderella Boy, a comedy web comic deconstructing classic fairytale tropes

== Notes and references ==
Notes
