= Van Von Hunter =

Parody manga series

- Van Von Hunter volume 2.
- Author(s): Mike Schwark & Ron Kaulfersch of Pseudomé Studio
- Website: www.vanvonhunter.com
- Current status/schedule: Weekly
- Launch date: February 14, 2002
- Publisher(s): Australia/NZ Madman Entertainment; Canada/US Tokyopop
- Genre(s): Fantasy, Parody

Van Von Hunter is a weekly hand-drawn parody original English-language manga started in 2002 by Mike Schwark and Ron Kaulfersch of Pseudomé Studio, based in Cleveland, Ohio. It has been published in newspapers, books, and as a webcomic. The story takes place in the land of Dikay, a country fraught with zombies, and focuses on the warrior Van Von Hunter and his "never-ending fight against evil...stuff".

== Publication history ==
In the Summer of 2006, Van Von Hunter started a six-month run of Sunday newspapers. It was syndicated by Universal Press Syndicate and published in approximately 30 papers in North America (and one in Sweden), including the Los Angeles Times, The Denver Post, the Seattle Post-Intelligencer, The Detroit News, The Oregonian, The Vancouver Sun, and the Toronto Sun. Van Von Hunter was the second Tokyopop manga to be syndicated to newspapers, the first being Peach Fuzz by Jared Hodges and Lindsay Cibos.

== Characters ==
- Van Von Hunter – The protagonist, Von Hunter is a jovial and easygoing adventurer who is dedicated to battling evil. While not particularly intelligent, Von Hunter makes up for his shortcomings with his strong sense of justice and armed-combat skills. His original name was Van Von Vaughn, but he changed it to suit his profession.
- Van Von Hunter's sidekick – A young woman whom Von Hunter rescued from Count Disdain. Before being able to introduce herself, she was struck on the head and lost her memory. She travels with Von Hunter because she has nowhere else to go. She does not do much fighting, but her common sense saves Von Hunter on occasion.
- Prince Lesley Mortimer Lamorte – He is better known by his chosen title, the Flaming Prince (he forgot the implications at the time). Lamorte rules over Dikay Kingdom at the wish of his more malicious father. He is Van Von Hunter's self-proclaimed sworn nemesis, though is even less intelligent than Von Hunter himself. The Flaming Prince employs monster minions to dispose of Von Hunter.
- The Man in the Dark Glasses – The Flaming Prince's right-hand man. He provides the prince with encouragement, thoughtful advice, and random things to crush in his hand. He is secretly the glue that holds the kingdom together.
- The Archmage Ariana Rael – An adorable young girl who destroyed her village when they tried to feed her to a dragon, she was hired by the Flaming Prince as a secret weapon. When Von Hunter arrived to do battle with the Prince, Ariana was supposed to destroy him with her powerful pyromancy, the Mega-Destruction Flare. Instead, she simply burned everything surrounding him. "Ari" ended up traveling with Von Hunter for a time.
- Vengeance Joe – An easily-angered antagonist with no known past. His defining feature is that once he is angered, nothing can stop him from finding his revenge. His list of enemies is long and varied, ranging from a staircase (for tripping him) to the ignorant Von Hunter (for not introducing himself as they passed each other on the street). He is now working to destroy all that Von Hunter cares for. Joe is allergic to walnuts.

=== Monsters ===
There are many types of monsters in Von Hunter's world.

- Zombies – Zombies seem to get appointed for the jobs that no one else wants in Von Hunter's world, from lawyers to accountants. They also display lower than average intelligence which makes them more harmful than useful. Wanted posters in zombie-infested woods can be seen as "zombie deflectors".
- Orcs – Large and dangerous creatures, which comprised a large portion of the Prince's army (before being wiped out by Ari).
- Goblins – More cute than deadly, goblins wear hats and outfits that make them resemble Christmas elves. They are by far the most useful of the Prince's forces (despite his apparent dislike for them) as they fill some of the menial chores (such as bartending), can be bizarrely versatile, and were able to restore the kingdom's finances through bake sales. They are talented chefs, and mesmerized Von Hunter's Sidekick with brownies (in the print version).
- Vampires – Vampires are undead beings, though not always humans, with fangs and pointed ears. They feed on blood and turn to dust when staked through the heart. Vampires are the rulers of the unnamed country where the webcomic opens.
- Ghouls – Ghouls are bald, and have pointed ears, fangs and nails. Ghouls eat humans and founded the unnamed country where the webcomic opens.
- Pollywacker – A 2-foot-tall (0.61 m) monster in the mysterious forest of the accursed valley of the Twelve Severed Heads, who terrorized the Valley until Von Hunter killed it.
- Gargoyles – Large winged monsters called "stoners" by the Prince. The Gargoyles of Von Hunter's world behave similar to stereotypical stoner teenagers.
- Bugs – The Insects (and most likely arachnids like spiders) are sentient creatures with their own society. They are still just as small, however. Their leader, Lord Chitin, was inadvertently killed by the Flaming Prince early on.
- Demons – The only demon seen in the webcomic is a large and ferocious-looking monster, similar in appearance to the Balrog. However, it is comforts the Beast when The Flaming Prince scolds it and is used to serve hot drinks.

Additional monsters include Trolls, Leprechaun, Dragons, Werewolves, Sasquatch, and Mummies.

== Live-action movie ==
In 2010, Van Von Hunter was adapted as a live-action film directed and written by Steven Calcote and Stuart J. Levy. It stars Yuri Lowenthal, Heather Marie Marsden, and Lucas Bridgeman. It won Levy and Calcote "Best Director" at Mockfest 2011.

== Collections ==
Starting in 2005, Tokyopop published a series of graphic novels set in the Van Von Hunter universe, taking place several years after the conclusion of the webcomic's plot.

- Van Von Hunter volume 1. ISBN 1-59532-692-8. TOKYOPOP. 2005-05-10
- Van Von Hunter volume 2. ISBN 1-59532-693-6. TOKYOPOP. 2005-09-13
- Van Von Hunter volume 3. ISBN 1-59532-694-4. TOKYOPOP. 2006-12-12

== Reception ==
In 2003, the webcomic won the first-place trophy at Tokyopop's inaugural Rising Stars of Manga contest.

Carlo Santos of Anime News Network stated: "For those who have grown tired of the fantasy genre's ridiculous self-importance and constantly recycled clichés, Van Von Hunter is the antidote, attacking these clichés with irreverent fervor. However, in doing so it becomes something of a cliché itself, relying on a predictable comedic approach and putting its characters in overused situations—not to mention that the whole adventure-comedy thing has been done plenty of times before." Reviewing the webcomic, Dani Atkinson of Sequential Tart stated that the black and white artstyle of Van Von Hunter is initially fairly "crude", but evolved into a more crisp tone as the series continued.
