= Stu Levy =

American businessman

Stuart J. Levy
- Born: 1967 (age 58–59)
- Education: University of California at Los Angeles, Georgetown University
- Occupations: Producer; director; writer
- Title: Founder and former CEO of Tokyopop

Stuart J. Levy (born 1967), also known by the pen name D.J. Milky, is an American entrepreneur, producer, and writer, best known as the founder of Tokyopop a media company focused on manga and related entertainment.

== Early life and education ==
Levy attended the University of California, Los Angeles, where he studied economics and business. He later earned a Juris Doctor degree from Georgetown University Law Center in 1991. Following his legal studies, he attended Keio University in Tokyo, where he participated in a Japanese language program.

== Career ==
=== Early career ===
In the mid-1990s, Stuart J. Levy was involved in early internet and media initiatives related to Japanese popular culture, including the creation of Japan Online (1995), an English-language web project focused on Japanese entertainment. During this period, he also contributed writing on video games and Japanese media, including work associated with Electronic Gaming Monthly. Through his company Tokyopop, Levy played a role in introducing and localizing Japanese manga for English-speaking audiences, overseeing early publications of titles such as Sailor Moon and Parasyte. He also authored an early English-language novel adaptation of Sailor Moon (1999), part of Tokyopop's efforts to expand the franchise into new formats for Western readers.

=== Founding of Tokyopop ===
In 1997, Levy founded Tokyopop (originally Mixx), which initially published serialized manga through the magazine Mixxzine.

In the early 2000s, the company began publishing manga in its original right-to-left format, a departure from the standard left-to-right format used in Western comics. This approach was later cited by industry observers as a factor in the growth of manga readership in North America.

Tokyopop expanded distribution into U.S. retail chains, including Waldenbooks and Borders, and published a range of Japanese manga titles, including Sailor Moon, one of its most widely recognized early releases. The company also launched initiatives such as Rising Stars of Manga, a competition aimed at developing original English-language manga creators.

=== Industry activity ===
During the 2000s under Levy, Tokyopop became one of the larger manga publishers in the United States. Coverage in publications such as The New York Times and Publishers Weekly discussed the company's role in the expansion of manga and Japanese pop culture in Western markets.

Levy also expanded the company's activities into anime distribution, music, and cross-media projects, and participated in early efforts to localize Korean comics (manhwa) for English-speaking audiences.

=== Film and media work ===
Levy has worked in film and television as a producer and director. His credits include the feature film Priest (2011), on which he served as an executive producer, as well as the documentaries Pray for Japan (2011) and Van Von Hunter(2011), which he directed.

He also co-created and wrote the manga series Princess Ai with Courtney Love. Princess Ai was the #1 graphic novel in the United States.

His work The Nightmare Before Christmas: Zero's Journey received nominations at the 2018 Diamond GEM Awards.

=== Recent activities ===
Levy relocated to Berlin in 2020. In 2023, he stepped back from day-to-day operations of Tokyopop's U.S. business while remaining involved in the company's strategic direction.

He has also been involved in international media initiatives, including a partnership with MBC Group related to anime production and distribution in the Middle East and North Africa.

In 2025, Levy was featured in an episode of The Anime Business, a documentary interview series examining the history of anime and manga in international markets.

=== Other works ===
Levy authored the first volume of an English-language novel adaptation of Sailor Moon (1999), part of a series published by Tokyopop that adapted the anime for younger readers. Under the pen name of D.J. Milky he also published novels Karma Club and Juror 13.

== Awards and recognition ==
Levy was named a finalist for the Ernst & Young Entrepreneur Of The Year award in Greater Los Angeles.
