= Manga (magazine) =

American manga magazine

Manga magazine, formerly known as Takuhai, is a free quarterly magazine published by Tokyopop, which gives preview chapters of a selection of the company's new manga titles, as well as fan art, interviews, and short articles. The magazine is intended as a publicity vehicle, similar to Tokyopop Sneaks, free preview compilations of Tokyopop titles.

== History and profile ==
It was first published in the summer of 2005. The magazine's original title, Takuhai meant "home delivery" in Japanese, but this was changed when Tokyopop discovered that many readers were accessing it through bookstores, comic stores, and newsstands. The magazine retitled to Manga in September 2005.

The magazine has two parts, each with its own cover page. The front half is read left-to-right, while the back half is read in Japanese style, right-to-left. Manga also includes an online issue with completely different material to the printed publication, and which is updated every month.
