= Peach Fuzz (comics) =

Original English-language manga series

- Cover of Peach Fuzz volume 1
- Genre: Humor/comedy
- Author: Lindsay Cibos, Jared Hodges
- Publisher: Madman Entertainment (Australia and New Zealand); Tokyopop (North America and United Kingdom)
- Demographic: Female
- Original run: 2005–2007
- Volumes: 3

Peach Fuzz is an original English-language manga written and illustrated by Lindsay Cibos and Jared Hodges. It was published in North America and the United Kingdom by Tokyopop in three volumes from January 11, 2005, to December 11, 2007. Peach Fuzz originally started as a short 17-page story in Tokyopop's 2nd Rising Stars of Manga competition, where it won the grand prize. The series also appeared in a Sunday comic strip form within Sunday newspaper comics sections. Peach Fuzz focuses on the relationship between a young girl and a ferret who believes herself to be a princess.

== Plot ==
The series begins when Amanda desires a unique pet and chooses a young ferret at the local pet shop. Her mother reluctantly yields to her decision on the condition that it should never injure her. Amanda names it Peach after seeing a fruit stand with peaches. Terrified of losing her new pet and companion, Amanda keeps Peach's biting a secret. Peach, in turn, rebels in a self-congratulatory way, maintaining that she is a ferret princess who must heroically retain her composure and courage while being tormented by five-headed giants and their slaves. After being forced to fight Mr. Fuzzy — a toy given to Peach which she views as a servant, Peach bites Amanda and Amanda, in response, tries the "Bitter Bite" spray to discipline her. Amanda's actions reminds her of her mother and Peach softens her view of Amanda.

Amanda brings Peach to her class's show and tell and because of Peach's popularity with the class, Amanda's friend Kim decides to get a ferret. Her ferret, Pavaratty, displays arrogance towards Peach and doubts her princess status since she lacks a palace, an entourage and treasure. Peach resolves to gain these things so she can impress the ferret prince. Meanwhile, two bullies turn Amanda's class against her after she wears a handmade ferret costume to school in an attempt to stand out. To collect more treasure, Peach secretly accompanies Amanda to school. Kim realizes Amanda's friendship is more important and admits she was wrong to turn against her. Peach accidentally saves the class's hamsters from being eaten by a snake which escaped during the show and tell. Amanda is redeemed in the class's eyes.

To ease Peach's boredom, Amanda gets another ferret, who is named Edwin after the hero of a romance novel. Initially Peach believes he is her ferret prince, but quickly becomes annoyed by him. Amanda brings the ferrets to her friend's house. There, Peach and Edwin meet Mimi's albino ferrets, the manic-depressive Spore and melancholy Truffle, who believe that they and anyone who enters their land is cursed. After Edwin breaks off a claw, Peach softens her view of him, but becomes ill. She recovers and decides that even if Edwin is not a prince, she still loves him.

== Development ==
As a young girl, Lindsay Cibos frequently read comic books such as Sonic the Hedgehog and Gargoyles. After learning about manga, she preferred it to comics because it had art and female-centered storylines that appealed to her. She found it easier to get into manga because they were self-contained stories that started at the beginning. She learned about Tokyopop's Rising Stars of Manga contest from a Tokyopop Newsblast e-mail but was unable to work on an entry for the contest because of other projects. For the second contest, she worked with Jared Hodges, whom she had met at an anime club in 1998, and set aside a month to work on her entry; she wanted to "make a good concise little story for the contest's 20-page limit." Based on a web-comic that the two had been working on, their entry "Peach Fuzz" won the grand prize, was published in Tokyopop's anthology and turned into a manga series of the same name. While drawing the series, Cibos and Hodges encountered the challenge of working with the screentone and "digitally inking" the comic.

Some of Peach Fuzz is based on real-life ferrets and places. The creators designed the ferret characters Peach and Edwin after Cibos's pet ferrets Momoko—Japanese for Peach—and Elf. They also modeled several of Edwin's mannerisms on Elf's. Elf's "single-minded obsession to a pair of headphones" became the model for "Pavaratty’s devotion to his toy microphone". In contrast, the human characters have no specific model. Cibos stated: "Bits and pieces were likely inspired from the people around me and from an amalgam of life experiences Jared and I had growing up: remembering what it was like to be in the fourth grade, having a pet for the first time, dealing with bullies, misunderstandings with parents, and so on." Several of the locations in Peach Fuzz, such as Mimi's apartments, were designed after real-life places.

== Release ==
Written and illustrated by Lindsay Cibos and Jared Hodges, Peach Fuzz was published in three volumes in North America and the United Kingdom by Tokyopop from January 11, 2005, to December 11, 2007. The first six chapters of Peach Fuzz also appeared as a serial in forty newspapers, including The Chicago Tribune, Los Angeles Times, and Vancouver Sun, from January to July 2006. In Australia and New Zealand, Madman Entertainment distributes the series. It is also licensed in Sweden by B. Wahlströms Bokförlag, in Germany by Tokyopop Germany, in Finland by Pauna Media Group, in Spain, and in Portugal by Edições Asa.

=== Volume list ===
No.	North American release date	North American ISBN
01	January 11, 2005	978-1-59532-599-0
01: "First Encounter"; 02: "R.I.P Van Ferret"; 03: "The Cost of Ferret"; 04: "Gladiator Peach"; 05: "Biting Terror"; 06: "Reforming Peach"
02	October 10, 2006	978-1-59532-600-3
"Prologue"; 01: "Show and Tell"; 02: "L'Entrata di Pavaratty (Pavaratty's Big Entrance)"; 03: "Changing Trends"; 04: "Nation Building"; 05: "The Deadly Visitor"
03	December 11, 2007	978-1-59532-601-0
01: "The Sound Behind the Door"; 02: "A Lone Wolf"; 03: "Prince Edwin"; 04: "The Box"; 05: "The Curse Part 1"; 06: "The Curse Part 2"

== Reception ==
Peach Fuzz received positive reviews from English-language critics. Newtype USA's Jennifer M. Contino enjoyed how much of the story focused on Peach's perspective and called the series "a promising debut". Danica Davidson of The Book Report praised the appeal of the "fun cast of characters" and described the series as "cute and warmhearted...with plenty of laughs." Johanna Draper Carlson, a longtime reviewer for Publishers Weekly, noted the potential of the series but thought it could have "benefited from experienced editing" and commented on the mixed messages being sent, stating: "If we root for the character we see most often, Peach, then we’re hoping to see her continue to misbehave. If we root for Amanda teaching Peach how to behave, then most of the material is irrelevant or mistargeted."
