= Mail Order Ninja =

OEL manga series

- Cover of Mail Order Ninja vol. 1 (2006), art by Erich Owen
- Genre: Humor/comedy
- Author: Joshua Elder
- Illustrator: Erich Owen
- Publisher: Tokyopop
- Original run: 2006 – Present
- Volumes: 3

Mail Order Ninja is an original English-language (OEL) manga written by Joshua Elder and illustrated by Erich Owen. It was the winner of Tokyopop's fifth Rising Stars of Manga competition. It is about a boy who orders a ninja from a comic book.

== Synopsis ==
The story starts with ten-year-old Timmy McAllister, a boy living in the small town of Cherry Creek, Indiana.

A fifth grader at L. Frank Baum Elementary School, he faces issues such as bullies. To help himself he enters a sweepstakes run by French entrepreneur Jaques. He wins and in a few weeks later his favorite ninja hero, Jiro Yoshida, arrives in the mail; thus the title.

== Characters ==
Timmy McAllister: The ten-year-old protagonist of the story. He is a fifth grader at L. Frank Baum Elementary School. Timmy attends Miss Sarah Melton's class and is an above average student. In Mail Order Ninja Volume One, he faces problems with bullies. His main bullies are Brock Breckenridge, Felicity Dominique Huntington, and even his own sister, Lindsay. To help with his bullying situation, he enters and wins a sweepstakes, and in turn gains a ninja in the mail, which turns out to be Jiro Yoshida, the main character of his favorite graphic novel. His favorite food is chocolate chip pancakes made by his mother, and he seems to be a manga reader, his favorite "graphic novel" being Ninja Warrior Gunshyo (Ninja Warrior Gunshyo is seen to be published by TOKYOPOP as a joke in the manga). Timmy's best friend is Herman W. Poindexter.

Jiro Yoshida: A powerful ninja from Clan Yoshida. Jiro once had a promising music career and was dubbed the "Japanese Barry Manilow" by critics. Barry Manilow is also on his Jpod (As seen on the Sunday comics version). After he arrives in Cherry Creek, he helps Timmy overthrow the social hierarchy and run things around Timmy's school. His rival is Hakuryuu Nobunaga, a ninja from the White Dragon Clan. He seems to have a love interest for Timmy's teacher, Sarah Melton. In volume two he is almost executed until Felicity's assistant Aleasa betrays her, and sets him free.

Felicity Dominique Huntington: The stereotypical rich girl of the series, she is Timmy's most harmful nemesis. Her father owns half of Cherry Creek, so she is horribly rich. She is at the top of their school's social rank, being reigning Little Miss Cherry Creek and sporting a new outfit (designer brands such as Versace, Armani and Gucci) every day. At the end of volume one and also volume two, she becomes bitter of Timmy's sudden rise and orders her own ninja. Coincidentally, the ninja she got was Hakuryuu Nobunaga, Jiro's rival. She constantly flaunts her wealth to other students, much to their dismay.

Herman W. Poindexter: Timmy's best friend in the series who is a stereotypical nerd. He attends Timmy's class, and is probably his only friend. He is a part of his school's Opera Appreciation Society, Calligraphy Club, Chess Club, Computer Club, and the International Council of Sci-Fi and Fantasy Fandom. He has a habit of using long words in sentences. He had four years of tap dancing classes and is shown to be girl shy, during the dance in volume 2.

Brock Breckenridge: The main bully at L. Frank Baum Elementary. Timmy is usually his target, and it is shown that he has extorted Timmy of more than three hundred dollars accumulated over the years. Every morning he runs a toll booth and forces other students to pay for passage. He seems to bully practically all the students who aren't up to his level, those including his own underlings. Just like Felicity, he is at the top of the social rank. He seems to know Lindsay personally, even sitting at lunch with her. He's not that strong of a reader. Brock has a bullying license from the American Bullying Association, which Timmy made Jiro slice into pieces.

Remus and Romulus Wolfe: Brock's underlings who assist him in bullying. They are obviously identical twins. Remus is more adapted to his left side (left-handed, hair covering left eye) while Romulus is more adapted to his right. They are the ones usually raiding the possessions of their victims. It turns out that Brock bullies them, two panels showing him pushing them and smacking their heads together. In the background of one panel, he is hitting Remus in the face. Their names are the ones of Romulus and Remus Wolf, mythological twins and the supposed founders of Rome.

Jacques: A man who runs Jacques Co., a toy company that is unusually odd. It turns out Jacques once worked for the army in making weapons, which is why his toys are usually dinosaurs, ninjas, guns, and other dangerous play toys. Jacques is responsible for giving both Timmy and Felicity Jiro and Nobunaga. He is also French.

Aleasa Duesenberg: Felicity's lowly assistant who usually follows her everywhere. She seems to do all of Felicity's minor tasks such as carrying her possessions in school or dusting off her show and tell objects. It's implied in her character card that she has very low self-esteem. In volume two she gains some redemption and sets Jiro free before he is to be executed, standing up to Felicity. It's implied at the end of volume two that she harbors a crush on Timmy.

Sarah Melton: Timmy's weary homeroom teacher. Her life is boring and meaningless until she sees Jiro for the first time. Afterwards, she falls instantly in love with him. She is possibly the first adult to snap out of Felicity's mind control. In volume two she leaves her classroom to save Jiro.

Hakuryuu Nobunaga: Jiro's rival, who is the leader of the White Dragon Clan. Surprisingly, he is also experienced in the law field and once sued his own mother because he simply did not like the birthday present she got him.
