= Teri Sue Wood =

American comic book artist (born 1965)

- Born: Teri Sue Wood; April 21, 1965 (age 61)
- Pseudonyms: Teresa Susan Challender, Resa Challender
- Notable works: early-'90s "Wandering Star" series.

Teri Sue Wood, also known as Teresa Susan Challender (born April 21, 1965), is an American comic artist best known for her 1993 to 1997 independent-comics series Wandering Star, which ran for 21 issues, and first found success with the comic strip The Cartoonist, which ran in Fantagraphics' Amazing Heroes magazine. In 2008, she changed her birth name of Wood to Challender after discovering that her legal father was not her biological father. Wood had a troubled relationship with her family, and took her new name from an uncle who took her in. She still goes by "Teri Sue Wood" in her professional work.

Wood's other work include webcomics, the furry comic Rhudiprrt: The Prince of Fur, published by MU Press, and Darklight, published by Sirius Entertainment. Her webcomic "Yet Untitled" is a light-hearted take on Forks, Washington, the setting of the Twilight series and also popular in Bigfoot mythology. In 2016, Dover Publications republished Wandering Star in an omnibus edition.
