= Tokyopop =

German-American entertainment company

- Status: Active
- Founded: 1997; 29 years ago
- Founder: Stuart J. Levy
- Country of origin: United States
- Headquarters location: Los Angeles, California
- Distribution: United States (Diamond Book Distributors)
- Publication types: Manga, Japanese light novels, graphic novels, original English-language manga
- Fiction genres: Books and anime
- Imprints: Tokyopop, Blu Manga, Love x Love
- Owners: TOKYOPOP Investor Holdings, LLC
- No. of employees: 11
- Official website: tokyopop.com

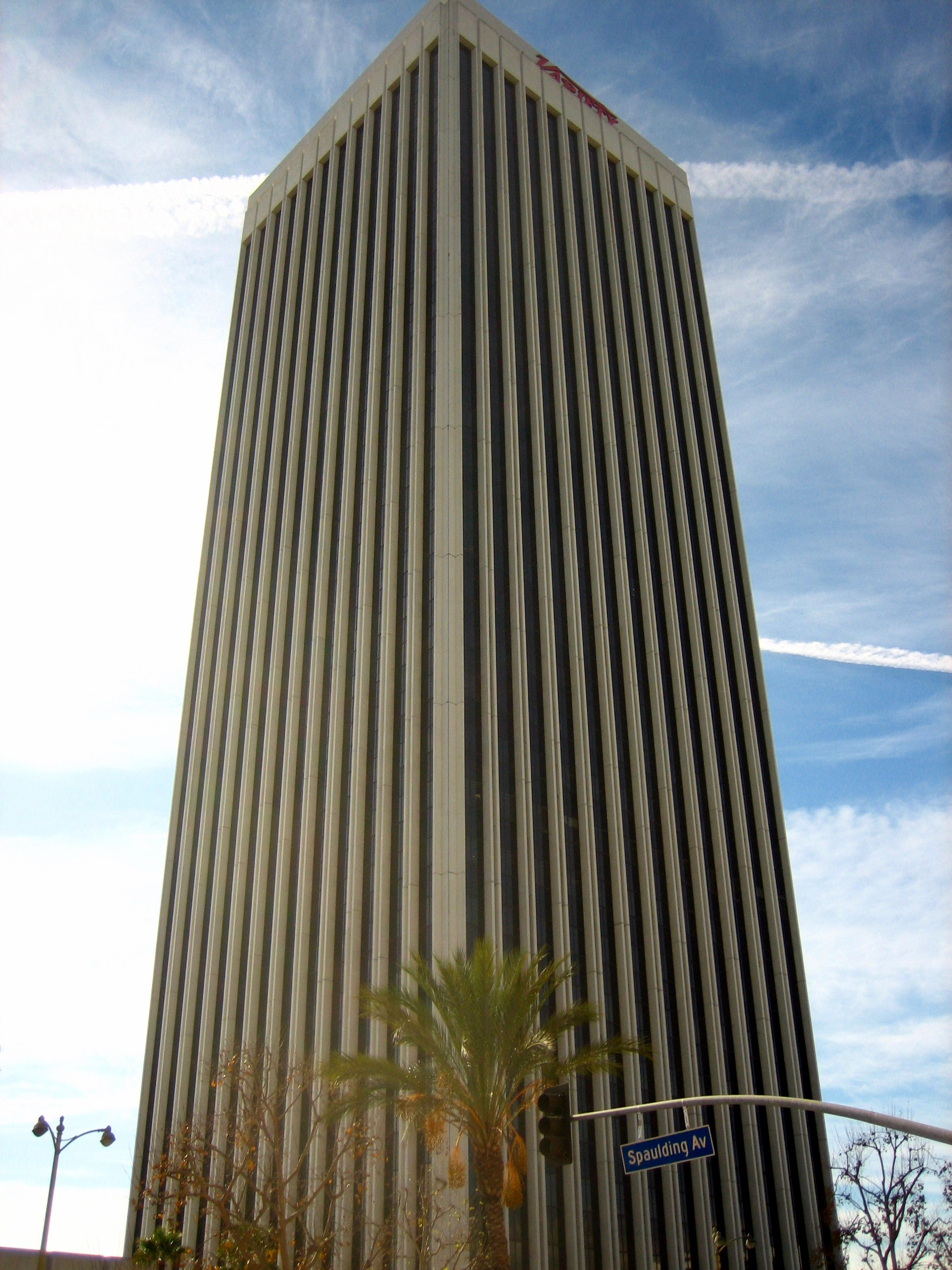
The Variety Building, the former location of the Tokyopop headquarters

Tokyopop (styled TOKYOPOP; formerly known as Mixx Entertainment) is an American distributor, licensor and publisher of anime, manga, manhwa and Western manga-style works. The German publishing division produces German translations of licensed Japanese properties and original English-language manga, as well as original German-language manga. Tokyopop's US publishing division publishes works in English. Tokyopop has its US headquarters near Los Angeles International Airport in Los Angeles, California.

Tokyopop was spun off as an independent company in December 2022 along with its German sister company, TOKYOPOP GmbH becoming a subsidiary of the new TOKYOPOP Inc.

== History ==
=== 1997–2014: founding and early history ===
Tokyopop was founded in 1997 by Stuart J. Levy. In the late 1990s, the company's headquarters were in Los Angeles.

Tokyopop published a manga magazine called MixxZine which serialized exclusively four classic manga of Kodansha including Sailor Moon, Magic Knight Rayearth, Parasyte, and Ice Blade. Eventually, MixxZine became an Asian pop culture publication entitled Tokyopop Magazine. Additionally, the company published a manga and tech magazine entitled Smile Magazine.

Cultural anthropologist Rachel Thorn praised Stu Levy for opening up an untapped market for animation with the publication of Sailor Moon and other. Before Sailor Moon, the belief among entertainment executives was that "girls don't watch cartoons." Due to Sailor Moon's immense popularity, Tokyopop discontinued the serial from its magazines, and released it separately as its first manga graphic novel. They engineered prominent book distribution via retail stores, standardized book trim size, created a basic industry-wide rating system, and developed the first-ever retail manga displays and introduced the world of graphic novels to an audience of teenage girls. Also, together with Diamond, Tokyopop offered retailers free spinner rack displays for Tokyopop manga, thereby increasing the visibility of the medium in bookstores.

Tokyopop also licensed and distributed Japanese anime. In 1996, Mixx Entertainment acquired the rights to the anime biopic of Japanese poet Kenji Miyazawa, and Stu Levy produced and directed the English version of the anime film, entitled Spring and Chaos. The film was directed and scripted by Shōji Kawamori, who created Super Dimension Fortress Macross and The Vision of Escaflowne. Taste of Cinema ranked "Spring and Chaos" thirteenth in its list of Top "25 Weird Animated Movies That Are Worth Your Time." From 2000 to 2004, Tokyopop released multiple film and television projects such as Street Fury, which Stu Levy created, GTO (English version for Showtime TV), Rave Master (English version for Cartoon Network's Toonami), and Reign: The Conqueror (English version for Cartoon Network's Adult Swim.) Tokyopop also released English version DVDs for: Initial D, Marmalade Boy, Saint Tail, Samurai Girl: Real Bout High School, Vampire Princess Miyu, Brigadoon, High School Ghostbusters. They also released English version DVDs for Frontier Martial-Arts Wrestling (FMW) professional wrestling shows with English-language commentary from John Watanabe and Eric Geller.

==== 100% Authentic Manga ====
In 2002, Tokyopop launched its line of "100% Authentic Manga", which was printed in the original Japanese right-to-left format and included the original Japanese printed sound effects.

In Japan, most published manga is written to read from right to left, but when an English translation was published in the U.S., however, the common practice was to use computer-reversed or mirror images that allowed the books to read from left to right. As a result, this distorted the artwork. Tokyopop's decision to use the original right-to-left format allowed the artwork to keep its original form and also enabled Tokyopop to release most graphic novel series on a frequency three-to-six times faster than the industry standard at the time. Tokyopop volumes hit the shelves monthly, bi-monthly or quarterly versus the six months or longer typical of competitors. It also allowed Tokyopop to sell books for an industry-leading price point of $9.99 per book, at a time when most competitors charged $12.99 to $16.99 per book.

Tokyopop was the first U.S. publisher to adopt such a sweeping policy. While some Japanese manga artists had required that the English versions of their manga be published from right to left, Tokyopop was the first American publisher to unilaterally announce that it would maintain the original format for all of its future manga titles.

An "authentic manga" how-to guide was included in each graphic novel to keep readers from accidentally reading the final page first, and the authentic manga also featured special packaging.

==== English-language manga ====
Tokyopop then launched their Global Manga publishing program in 2003 via the introduction of its "Rising Stars of Manga" talent competition. The competition called for American manga artists to submit 15–25 page English-language stories of any genre. The top 10 entries, as judged by Tokyopop editors, received cash prizes (between $500 – $2500) and were published in an anthology of the winning works. The grand prize winners were also given the chance to pitch full-length manga projects to Tokyopop for a chance to become professional manga-ka.

The company's 2003 publication of the original English-language (OEL) manga series Reality Check!, by Rikki Simons and Tavisha Wolfgarth-Simons (together known as Tavicat), sold 5,000 copies. The releases of Reality Check! and ShutterBox made Simons and Wolfgarth-Simons the first Americans to publish under the company. Publishers Weekly described the first volume as having "a sense of fun and imaginative details".

=== 2008–2011 ===
In June 2008, Tokyopop announced that it was being restructured, with its name being changed to Tokyopop Group, a holding group for several new subsidiaries. The Tokyopop operations in the United States were split into two subsidiaries: Tokyopop, Inc., and Tokyopop Media. Tokyopop, Inc. consisted of the company's existing publications business, while Tokyopop Media focused on the company's digital and comics-to-film works. Tokyopop Media managed the Tokyopop website, which continued to promote its publications. According to representative Mike Kiley, the divisions would allow the company to "set things up in ways that would very clearly and definitively allow those businesses to focus on what they need to do to succeed. The goals in each company are different and the achievement of those goals is more realistic, more possible if everyone working in each of those companies is very clearly focused."

Tokyopop's Japan division was also to be split, with one unit operating under Tokyopop Media and the other becoming a subsidiary under the overall Tokyopop Group. In response to Tokyopop's restructuring, declining sales, and losing 20% of its manga market share, Tokyopop UK cut its publication release schedule from approximately 25 volumes a month to 20.

In December 2008, citing "dramatically low sales" in the publishing industry as a whole, Tokyopop, Inc., laid off eight more employees, including three editors, and noted that the company would have to rearrange some of its upcoming publication schedules.

Licenses from the Japanese manga publisher Kodansha, historically, were a large part of Tokyopop's catalog. In the years leading up to 2009, however, the number of Kodansha titles licensed by Tokyopop decreased. The final new Kodansha title was Tokko by Tōru Fujisawa, and the final batch of volumes of Kodansha titles appeared around March 2009. Around that time Kodansha began to consistently give licenses to its manga to competitor Del Rey Manga. Deb Aoki of About.com said "Well, more or less. You get the idea. If you're the type who reads the tea leaves of the manga publishing biz, you kinda sensed that things weren't quite the same as they used to be."

On August 31, 2009, Tokyopop announced Kodansha was allowing all of its licensing agreements with both the North American and German divisions of Tokyopop to expire as it would start to publish its own official Kodansha series of English manga translations. Due to this loss in licensing, Tokyopop was forced to leave several Kodansha series unfinished, including the popular Rave Master, Initial D, GetBackers, and Life series. It would be unable to reprint any previously published volumes, rendering all Kodansha-owned Tokyopop releases out-of-print.

Several other titles licensed and published by Tokyopop, including best sellers Cardcaptor Sakura, Chobits, Clover, and Magic Knight Rayearth, were reacquired by Dark Horse Comics, though two other titles Kodansha licensed to Dark Horse had since transferred to Random House by then. Samurai Deeper Kyo was relicensed by competitor Del Rey Manga, a division of Random House, which published the remaining volumes of the series.

Tokyopop said that it expected the loss of the licenses to have minimal impact on the company economically due to its diversification of their holdings over the last few years, though they acknowledged the loss would hurt fans of the ongoing series who face uncertainty about the completion of those titles from other companies. ICv2 reported that Tokyopop would continue to publish light novels from Kodansha and that Kodansha appeared to be planning to publish its own titles through its partnership with Random House.

==== Resignation and layoffs ====
In February 2011, the president and chief operating officer, John Parker, resigned from the company and took the position of vice president of business development for Diamond. This came shortly after Diamond became Tokyopop's new distributor, taking the business from HarperCollins. Tokyopop did not name a replacement for Parker. Parker's departure left only three remaining executives: the founder and CEO, Stuart Levy; Publisher, Mike Kiley; and Vice President of Inventory, Victor Chin.

On March 1, Tokyopop continued to lay off workers, removing many high-profile employees such as long-time manga editors Lilian Diaz-Przyhyl and Troy Lewter. Tokyopop's management also eliminated the position of director of sales operations. In an interview with ICv2, Stuart Levy revealed that the layoffs were due to Borders, Tokyopop's largest customer, filing bankruptcy in March 2011, no longer carrying Tokyopop stock, and not paying debts that the company owed to Tokyopop.

==== North American publishing shutdown ====
On April 15, 2011, Tokyopop announced that it would close its Los Angeles, California–based North American publishing operations on May 31, 2011. According to the release, Tokyopop's film and television projects, as well as European publishing operations and global rights sales, would not be closing. The UK branch would cease to operate after May 31 due to their reliance on the importing of the North American branch's product. Stuart Levy, Tokyopop's founder, released a personal statement reaffirming Tokyopop's role in introducing manga to the mainstream North American audience and thanking fans, creators, and employees for their dedication. On May 24, Tokyopop stated that the manga they licensed would revert to their original owners, who may license the titles to other companies.

=== 2011–present: revival and expansion ===
In October 2011, Tokyopop's official Twitter account released a message stating that its "ultimate goal is to start publishing manga again."

On December 10, 2012, Tokyopop's website relaunched with a letter from management stating that the company was down to a few select employees who were starting a 'new incarnation' of the company. Partnered with 'Right Stuf on Demand', they began offering ebooks of various titles for which they retained the rights.

Their company blog article stated:

Luckily new technologies that have only very recently become practical are enabling us to re-emerge. Conventional publishing has irrevocably changed, and it is impractical for all but the largest and most established companies to pursue publishing as it has gone on for centuries. But by embracing ebook and print-on-demand technologies, we believe we can move forward and continue to produce some amazing manga as well as bring you Asian Pop Culture in many forms.

A letter from Levy on January 6, 2013, stated:

Digital technology has transformed many industries including publishing. This hit TOKYOPOP very hard since we didn't have ebook rights to most of our series (except OEL). Unfortunately our Japanese licensors did not move fast enough to provide a legitimate alternative to piracy, and piracy shows no mercy. As a result, TOKYOPOP had to shut down its LA office and the licenses to Japanese titles expired, reverting to the Japanese licensors. What that means is TOKYOPOP is evolving as a company. I know many fans would prefer us to return to being a manga publisher like we were for most of our history. However, manga will never disappear – we will do what we can to deliver manga. I plan on experimenting with new ways to bring you Asian pop culture. Please keep an open mind – and give feedback (not just negative when you don't like something but also positive when you like something) so we can tweak our approach.

Throughout the publishing closure, Tokyopop Media remained open for business, continuing its efforts to produce film and TV adaptations of Tokyopop's manga, as well as reinvigorating the Tokyopop YouTube channel, launching several original web series and adding trailers for Japanese film and TV. In 2013, Tokyopop partnered with MondoMedia to release an animated short film based on the Tokyopop manga Riding Shotgun, which was directed by Michael Davis and starred the voices of Yuri Lowenthal and Jessy Schram. The short film garnered over a million views in its first month, and led to an IndieGoGo campaign to finance a full animated series.

==== Relaunch ====
In 2015, at Anime Expo and San Diego Comic-Con, Tokyopop announced that it would be relaunching its publishing operations in North America in 2016 and hinted that its first major licensor would be Disney. TOKYOPOP resumed regular publishing activities beginning in 2016, marking a gradual rebuilding phase focused on licensed manga, original graphic novels, and light novels.

In January 2018, Tokyopop announced the release dates for three new properties: Konohana Kitan, Futaribeya: A Room for Two, and Hanger. Additionally, TOKYOPOP initiated "International Woman of Manga" to showcase non-Japanese female manga writers with the publication of five titles: Ocean of Secrets, Goldfisch, Kamo, Undead Messiah, and Sword Princess Amaltea. Tokyopop's "Nightmare Before Christmas: Zero's Journey" was nominated for two 2018 Diamond GEM awards in the categories "2018 Best All Ages Series" and "2018 Licensed TP or HC of the Year".

Between 2020 and 2023, TOKYOPOP experienced sales growth amid renewed global interest in manga. In both 2022 and 2023, the company was named to Publishers Weekly’s list of fast-growing independent publishers.

==== Licensing and partnerships ====
In 2021, Cracker Barrel Old Country Store restaurants agreed to sell specific Tokyopop Manga by offering Disney's The Nightmare Before Christmas adaptation by Jun Asuka in its North American in-store gift shops.

In May 2024, TOKYOPOP announced a global distribution agreement with Penguin Random House Publisher Services that would go into effect on January 1, 2025.

In 2025, TOKYOPOP announced publishing partnerships with Mattel to develop original manga-style graphic novels based on brands like Barbie and Hot Wheels.

TOKYOPOP has also entered into licensing agreements with The Walt Disney Company for publishing projects, as well as announced a collaboration with Middle East Broadcasting Center (MBC) to produce anime content for regional audiences. In Europe, TOKYOPOP Germany participated in licensed fan-facing events, including a Naruto-themed promotional gallery exhibition held in Berlin.

In January 2026, TOKYOPOP announced the launch of its first audiobook program, featuring select titles from its LoveLove light novel imprint. The audiobooks are distributed by RBMedia through its Dreamscape Media audio division.

== Influence ==
Tokyopop became one of the biggest manga publishers outside Japan, and as such, was attributed with popularizing manga in the United States. By 2004, it boasted the largest market share of manga sales in the U.S., reaching as high as 50% of manga exports to the United States, according to Nissei Weekly.

=== Western reach ===
Tokyopop was also instrumental in the introduction of manhwa to western audiences. Brad Brooks and Tim Pilcher, authors of The Essential Guide to World Comics. London, said that Tokyopop "published many Korean artists' work, possibly without Western fans even realizing the strips don't come from Japan. Series like King of Hell by Kim Jae-hwan and Ra In-soo, and the Gothic vampire tale Model by Lee So-young are both Korean, but could easily be mistaken for manga." In 2005, Tokyopop began a new, free publication called Manga (originally Takuhai) to feature their latest releases.

Tokyopop secured newspaper distribution in the form of Sunday comics, featuring its titles Princess Ai, Mail Order Ninja, Peach Fuzz, and Van Von Hunter.

In March 2006, Tokyopop and HarperCollins Publishers announced a co-publishing agreement in which the sale and distribution rights of some Tokyopop manga and books, under this co-publishing license, would be transferred to HarperCollins in mid-June 2006. The agreement enabled Tokyopop to produce original English-language (OEL) manga adaptations of HarperCollins' books. Meg Cabot's books were the first to be adapted into the manga format, along with the Warriors series by Erin Hunter. The first line of Tokyopop-HarperCollins OEL manga was released in 2007 with the goal of publishing up to 24 titles each year.

Tokyopop entered a licensing arrangement with Kaplan, a leading provider of educational and training services in 2007, to help students study vocabulary words in preparation for the SATs.

Tokyopop has released several series based on American games, films, and characters, such as Warcraft, the Kingdom Hearts video game series, and Jim Henson films. They released the first volume of a series based on the Hellgate: London video game in April 2008.

=== Rising Stars of Manga ===
Tokyopop launched its first "Rising Stars of Manga" contest on August 15, 2002, and ended it on December 16, 2002, with more than five hundred American artists submitting their 15–25 page, English-language stories.

The 5th Rising Stars of Manga competition added the People's Choice award, where the top-20 finalists had their entire entries judged by the fans on the Tokyopop website. "We are really pleased to open up the Rising Stars judging to the fans," commented Tokyopop editor Rob Valois. "Since so many people have been vocal on the message boards and at industry conventions, we're offering them all a chance to shape the future of manga. I'm personally excited to see how the fans' favorite will compare to our own."

Tokyopop held eight Rising Stars of Manga competitions between 2002 and 2008, as well as one in the UK in 2005.

Several Rising Stars of Manga winners went on to publish full-length graphic novels with Tokyopop, including Josh Elder with Mail Order Ninja, M. Alice LeGrow with Bizenghast, Mike Schwark and Ron Kaulfersch with Van Von Hunter, Lindsay Cibos and Jared Hodges with Peach Fuzz, Wes Abbot with Dogby Walks Alone, Felipe Smith with MBQ, and Nathan Maurer with Atomic King Daidogan.

As of July 2022, a new Rising Stars of Manga 25th Year Anniversary edition was announced.

=== CineManga ===
TOKYOPOP pioneered the Cine-Manga format, which took popular animated and live-action series and films and turned them into colored print editions. Titles included popular Nickelodeon cartoon series like Avatar: The Last Airbender and SpongeBob SquarePants. As well as franchises such as Star Wars, Akira, Lizzie McGuire, Cardcaptor Sakura, Kim Possible, Family Guy, Hannah Montana, amongst many others like Power Rangers.

== Divisions and companies ==
=== Tokyopop GmbH ===
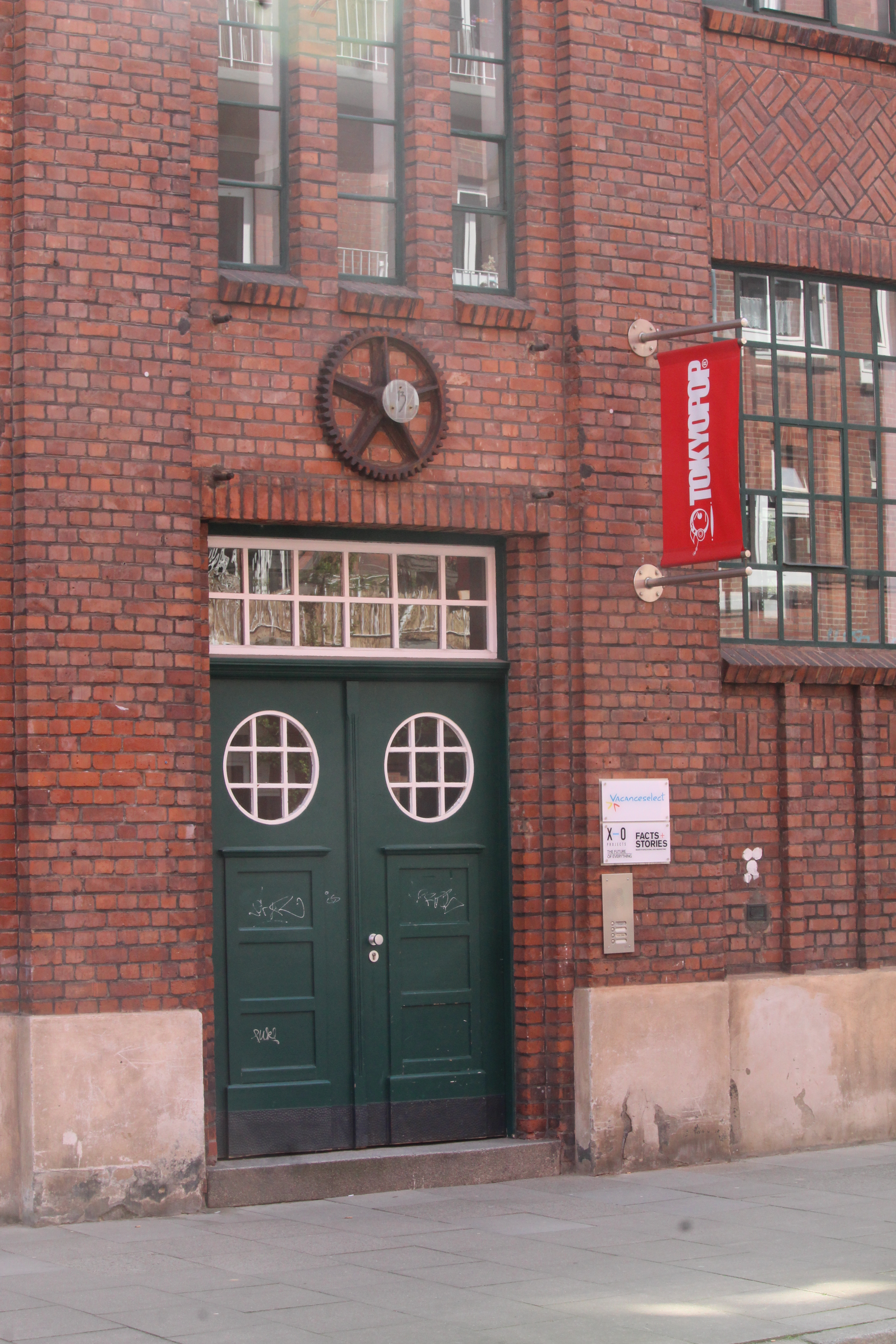
Tokyopop Germany's former headquarters in Hamburg

Tokyopop's European entity is located in Hamburg, Germany and publishes both print and digital titles across a range of content and formats. In 2021, Tokyopop GmbH was one of Germany's Top 100 publishing companies. The first manga and manhwa by Tokyopop Germany were published in November 2004, and the first anime in the fall of 2005. In 2006, Tokyopop GmbH entered a "strategic partnership" with the Japanese publisher Shueisha, allowing them to publish popular titles such as Death Note and Bleach. The company has also released a number of original German-language manga, including Gothic Sports, winner of a 2007 Sondermann award. Tokyopop GmbH continues to operate as a publisher of German-language manga for the international market after the closure of the US publishing office.

In addition to publishing popular manga titles, Tokyopop GmbH also expanded the market by producing new and exciting cross-media content, including licensing popular video game franchises such as Assassin's Creed and Zelda and bestselling novels such as James Patterson and Warriors. In 2013, the company launched a prestige project called Manga Library, which adapted classic literary novels into manga.

According to GFK Entertainment, as of 2014 in the core segment of manga, Tokyopop GmbH is currently the second largest provider, with a market share of 27%. Additionally, in the last two years, Tokyopop GmbH had the fastest growth rate out of the big three manga suppliers in the German market, with a growth rate of 29% in 2014. This compares with Egmont Ehapa at 6.5% and Carlsen Verlag at 1.8%.

=== Other overseas markets ===
In 2004, Tokyopop set up a division in the United Kingdom based in London that mainly imported books from its original American counterpart and distributed them to bookstores in both the United Kingdom and the Republic of Ireland. Tokyopop released an anime collection in both countries in late 2006, including titles such as Initial D and Great Teacher Onizuka. Vampire Princess Miyu was released on DVD by MVM Entertainment and the Toonami television channel aired the first half of Rave Master in early 2005. It was announced on the official Tokyopop Facebook page that because the British division mainly imported the North American branch's translated titles, it would become defunct with the only open branch being the German division.

Tokyopop distributed some of its titles to Australia and New Zealand via Madman Entertainment/Funtastic and in Greece, Tokyopop properties were licensed by Anubis Comics. Tokyopop partnered with IDW International in February 2018 to license its original intellectual property (IP) and manga in overseas markets.

== Imprints ==
Logo for Blu Manga

=== Blu Manga ===
Blu Manga is an imprint under which Tokyopop published shōnen-ai and yaoi manga titles. The imprint was launched in 2005. Initially, the company denied that it owned Blu, stating that it was only distributing for another company. The company released no editor names, nor company contact info out of fear there would be backlash and hate mail from "moral crusaders". In 2006, Tokyopop confirmed Blu was their own imprint. Blu Manga considered that their "non-girly" branding had enabled the imprint, in a genre stereotypically created by women for women, to reach out to a male and gay audience. Early titles published by BLU were Earthian, Love Mode, and Shinobu Kokoro.

=== Love x Love ===
In 2020, Tokyopop introduced a new Inclusive Romance manga lineup, with a focus on providing BL/Yaoi manga, GL/Yuri manga, and male/female romance manga under the same imprint.

== Reception ==
The Daily Dot described the company as a major force in the early 2000s manga boom, noting that it helped introduce manga to a broad generation of English-speaking readers and became one of the most visible publishers of Japanese comics in North America.

Publishers Weekly ranked Tokyopop #1 on its Fast-Growing Independent Publishers list, citing that 2022 sales doubled over 2021 and were up 580% from 2020.

In a June 2023 article for Forbes, Rob Salkowitz presented a positive assessment of Tokyopop within the rapidly expanding manga and webtoon market in the United States. Writing in "New Manga, Webtoon Imprints Flourish As Publishers Aim For Red Hot Market," Salkowitz described Tokyopop as "one of the first publishers to turn manga into a mass market phenomenon in bookstores", emphasizing its foundational role in popularizing manga through its pocket-sized paperback editions during the early 2000s.

== Manga in teen magazine CosmoGirl ==
In 2005, Tokyopop partnered with mainstream teen magazine CosmoGirl to serialize a manga entitled "The Adventures of CG!", drawn by Svetlana Chmakova.

== Children's books ==
The company published books for younger children including picture books based on Japanese character Stray Sheep.

== Disney manga ==
Tokyopop has licensed several Disney manga titles and series in the US, including The Nightmare Before Christmas, Descendants, Kilala Princess and Donald Duck Visits Japan.

== See also ==
- List of Tokyopop publications
- Nerdist
- Nerdist News
