= Tomo-Dachi =

Anime convention in Northern Ireland

- Status: Defunct
- Venue: Magee College
- Locations: Derry, Northern Ireland
- Inaugurated: 2005
- Most recent: 2007
- Attendance: 200+ in 2006
- Major events: Video Rooms, Cosplay Catwalk, Cosplay Theatre, Disco, Dealer's Room, Panels, Video Game Rooms, Artist's Alley, Manga Rooms, and Karaoke.

Tomo-Dachi was an anime convention based in Derry, Northern Ireland.

Starting in the summer of 2005, Tomo-Dachi was the first anime convention to run in Ireland.

The original venue was The Nerve Centre, on Magazine Street in the city centre of Derry. Tomo-Dachi, also known as TDXX (the "XX" is replaced by the year - such as TD05, TD06, etc.) is now held annually at the Magee College of the University of Ulster.

The name of the event comes from the word tomodachi (友達), which means "friends" in Japanese.

== History ==
In 2004 when the original Tomo-dachi committee was formed there had never been an anime convention held anywhere in Ireland, north or south of the border. The announcement and run up to the first outing of the anime convention was reported in multiple local and national based papers including the Belfast Telegraph, The News Letter and the Daily Ireland.

== Tomo-Dachi 2005 ==
Tomo-Dachi 2005 (or TD05 for short) was held in August 2005. It was the first anime convention to be held on the Island of Ireland, and was operated and run by DAMA, the Derry Anime and Manga Association. The one-day event attracted 83 people.

=== Location & Details ===
TD05 took place at the Nerve Centre, a public entertainment venue in Derry based in the city centre, and the convention made use of its unique facilities. This was venue where the Derry Anime and Manga Association held their meetings.

The one-day convention was made up of multiple areas. One screening room, that being an actual cinema.

The event also held Northern Ireland's first Anime Convention Cosplay Contest, which was won by Ryan McDermott.

== Tomo-Dachi 2006 ==
The plans for the following year's event included a change of venue and lengthening Tomo-Dachi into a three days event.

The convention took place on the weekend of 7 July 2006.

=== Guests ===
The convention was attended by several guests, most notably Ms Tiffany Grant and Mr Matt Greenfield in their first ever convention visit in Europe. They were joined by Hugh David of ADV films UK, Sonia Leong and Emma Vieceli both of Sweatdrop Manga Studios.

=== Location & Details ===
TD06 was held at Magee College, part of the University of Ulster. The campus was fully renovated prior to the event, With classrooms converted into gaming rooms, screening rooms, an artists alley and a Manga library.

TD06 was a three-day convention and offered special events, panels, industry information, dealers and more. Over the weekend it was attended by just over 200 people from Ireland and the United Kingdom.

== Tomo-Dachi 2007 ==
Tomo-Dachi 2007 was held on the weekend starting 24 August.

The first guest announced for the convention was Guest of Honour Mike McFarland, voice actor and director for FUNimation Entertainment. Other guests include Stuart Claw and Emma Vieceli hosts of the UK's Anime Network, Sonia Leong, Manga artist and Hugh David representative of ADV Films.
