= Sonia Leong =

British comics artist and illustrator

- Born: 7 May 1982 (age 44) Malaysia
- Area: Illustrator

Sonia Leong (born 7 May 1982) is a British freelance comic artist, illustrator and member of Sweatdrop Studios.

== Biography ==
Leong was born in Malaysia and lived in Thailand from 1989 to 2000. She then attended University of Warwick, Economics and Politics BSc (Hons) from 2000 to 2003, and currently resides in Cambridge, UK. She is a freelance illustrator regularly attending anime and comic conventions in the UK and internationally.

She first came to attention when she illustrated an adaptation of William Shakespeare's Romeo & Juliet for SelfMadeHero which has since been listed in the Young Adult Library Services Association (YALSA) '2008 Quick Picks for Reluctant Young Adult Readers' and 'Best Books for Young Adults 2008'.

Her early competition achievements include 2nd place Winner in the first Tokyopop Rising Stars of Manga United Kingdom & Ireland Competition; Winner in NEO Magazine's 2005 Manga Competition and being Joint Judge for the Character Design category of the International Manga and Anime Festival (IMAF).

She has worked for various comic publishers, illustrating covers, spreads and anthologies. She contributed a chapter towards the Eisner Award-winning 'Tori Amos' Comic Book Tattoo' a 480-page anthology published by Image Comics. She also illustrated a chapter for Tokyopop's 'DOMO: The Manga', an anthology starring the popular Japanese television mascot Domo, as well an adaptation of 'Reginald' by Saki for The Graphic Canon and 'Justice Bao' for The Graphic Canon of Crime and Mystery from Seven Stories Press. She created a spread for the picture book 'Bravest Warriors: The Search For Catbug' published by Viz Media / Perfect Square. She also illustrated several variant covers for Titan Comics, most notably for the Ubisoft videogame Manga retelling of Assassin's Creed IV: Black Flag by Kenji Oiwa titled 'Assassin's Creed: Awakening' and 'Norman' by Stan Silas. She created several illustrations for the Doctor Who anthology 'The Women Who Lived' for BBC Books.

She produced a short Manga comic called 'Aygo Manga: Adventure One' as part of Toyota GB PLC's promotional campaign for the 2014 model of their Toyota Aygo car. Most recently, she illustrated a series of images for the Toyota 86 in the style of the classic seinen manga Initial D, as the main character drives a Toyota AE86. Toyota created a car in the same livery for 'touring UK car shows in 2016'.

She is the Company Secretary of Sweatdrop Studios and her works with the group include 'Once Upon a Time...'; 'Cyborg Butterfly'; 'Satan's Amazon'; 'Murder on the Dancefloor' for the 'Sugardrops' anthology; 'Return to Chenezzar' for 'Pink is for Girls'; 'Model Behaviour' for 'Drop Dead Monstrous'; 'Hero' for 'Talking to Strangers'; 'The Snow Queen' for 'Telling Tales','Love Stuffing' and 'A Brush With Magic'. Leong is the Art Director for the 'Aya.Takeo' webcomic; commissioned by Prentice Associates and now published by Sweatdrop Studios across three volumes.

She has authored many instructional art books, such as 'Beginning Manga' (Walter Foster), 'Manga Your World' (Search Press), 'Draw Manga: Complete Skills' (Search Press) and '101 Top Tips from Professional Manga Artists' (Barrons). She was the Head Contributor to 'Draw Manga' by Sweatdrop Studios from New Holland Publishers (UK) Ltd. Her work also appears in '500 Manga Characters' by Sweatdrop Studios from Ilex; 'Drawing Manga' by Selina Dean; 'Manga Clip Art' by Hayden Scott-Baron,'50 Manga Babes to Draw and Paint' by Chi Hang Li. and 'Super Cute Chibis to Draw and Paint' by Joanna Zhou.

She illustrated the graphic novel 'Great Lives: Marie Curie' for B.E.S. Publishing and the 'Manga Life' series of self-help books for Infinite Ideas. and headed the conceptual art and design of the collectible card game 'Herocard Cyberspace' from Tablestar Games.

Her work appeared in Popcorn, a British movie directed by Darren Paul Fisher, starring Jack Ryder (EastEnders) and Jodie Albert (Hollyoaks). Her illustrations were also used on the set of Channel 4's award-winning British sitcom The IT Crowd in series 3, as well the dark comedy Flowers (TV series). She was also filmed for CNN International's 2015 coverage of Formula One historic battles at the Suzuka Circuit, illustrating the rivalry between Ayrton Senna and Alain Prost.

Leong's work in children's publishing includes illustrating the choose-your-own-adventure style 'I, Hero' series by Steve Skidmore and Steve Barrow (The Two Steves) for Hachette; the 'Girls FC' series by Helena Pielichaty for Walker Books; and 'Ninja: First Mission' by Chris Bradford of Young Samurai fame.

Leong collaborated on Wacom's Manga campaign which appeared in major German magazines using her art to promote the wildly successful 'Pimp My Character' contest featured in the German publication Animania; her work also featured on the Wacom website in an article promoting the use of Wacom in the creation of manga.

== Bibliography ==
- The Graphic Canon of Crime and Mystery volume 2 (by Russ Kick, Seven Stories Press, May 2020, ISBN 978-1-6098-0826-6)
- Illustration Studio: Drawing Manga Heroes and Heroines (Walter Foster Publishing, October 2019, ISBN 978-1-6332-2804-7)
- Marie Curie: A Graphic History of the World's Most Famous Female Scientist (by Agnieszka Biskup, B.E.S. Publishing, June 2019, ISBN 978-1-4380-1204-9)
- Doctor Who: The Women Who Lived (by Christel Dee and Simon Guerrier, BBC Books, September 2018, ISBN 978-1-7859-4359-1)
- Illustration Studio: Beginning Manga (Walter Foster Publishing, September 2016, ISBN 978-1-6332-2075-1)
- Manga Your World (Search Press, January 2016, ISBN 978-1-7822-1400-7)
- How To Draw Manga Made Easy (by Helen McCarthy, Flame Tree Publishing, May 2015, ISBN 978-1-7836-1592-6)
- A Brush With Magic (Sweatdrop Studios, May 2015, ISBN 978-1-9050-3843-5)
- Bravest Warriors: The Search For Catbug (Joel Enos, Perfect Square, August 2014, ISBN 978-1-4215-7177-5)
- Ninja: Assassin (Chris Bradford, Barrington Stoke, June 2014, ISBN 978-1-7811-2376-8)
- Draw Manga: Complete Skills (Search Press, October 2013, ISBN 978-1-8444-8938-1)
- Ninja: Death Touch (Chris Bradford, Barrington Stoke, August 2013, ISBN 978-1-7811-2210-5)
- The Graphic Canon volume 3 (by Russ Kick, Seven Stories Press, June 2013, ISBN 978-1-6098-0380-3)
- 101 Top Tips from Professional Manga Artists (Ilex, April 2013, ISBN 978-1-7815-7030-2)
- Aya Takeo volume 3 (with Lloyd Prentice; Sweatdrop Studios, March 2012, ISBN 978-1-9050-3834-3)
- Girls FC 10: Has Anyone Seen Our Striker? (Helena Pielichaty, Walker Books, October 2011, ISBN 978-1-4063-1731-2)
- Aya Takeo volume 2 (with Lloyd Prentice; Sweatdrop Studios, June 2011, ISBN 978-1-905038-31-2)
- Ninja: First Mission (Chris Bradford, Barrington Stoke, June 2011, ISBN 978-1-84299-939-4)
- Girls FC 9: We're The Dream Team, Right? (Helena Pielichaty, Walker Books, May 2011, ISBN 978-1-4063-1741-1)
- Tomb Runner (I Hero series by Steve Skidmore and Steve Barlow, Franklin Watts, October 2010, ISBN 978-0-7496-9679-5)
- Dragonslayer (I Hero series by Steve Skidmore and Steve Barlow, Franklin Watts, October 2010, ISBN 978-0-7496-9678-8)
- Girls FC 8: Can't I Just Kick It? (Helena Pielichaty, Walker Books, August 2010, ISBN 978-1-4063-1740-4)
- Girls FC 7: So What If I Hog The Ball? (Helena Pielichaty, Walker Books, May 2010, ISBN 978-1-4063-1739-8)
- Telling Tales (multiple artists; Sweatdrop Studios, May 2010, ISBN 978-1-905038-28-2)
- Girls FC 6: What's Ukrainian For Football? (Helena Pielichaty, Walker Books, November 2009, ISBN 978-1-4063-1738-1)
- Girls FC 5: Who Ate All The Pies? (Helena Pielichaty, Walker Books, November 2009, ISBN 978-1-4063-1737-4)
- Talking to Strangers (Fehed Said and multiple artists, Sweatdrop Studios, October 2009, ISBN 978-1-905038-26-8)
- DOMO: The Manga (Clint Bickham and multiple artists, Tokyopop, October 2009, ISBN 978-1-4278-1597-2)
- Girls FC 4: Is An Own Goal Bad? (Helena Pielichaty, Walker Books, August 2009, ISBN 978-1-4063-1736-7)
- Girls FC 3: Are All Brothers Foul? (Helena Pielichaty, Walker Books, August 2009, ISBN 978-1-4063-1735-0)
- Girls FC 2: Can Ponies Take Penalties? (Helena Pielichaty, Walker Books, August 2009, ISBN 978-1-4063-1734-3)
- Girls FC 1: Do Goalkeepers Wear Tiaras? (Helena Pielichaty, Walker Books, August 2009, ISBN 978-1-4063-1730-5)
- Love Stuffing volume 1 (with Stereoblind, Sweatdrop Studios, May 2009, ISBN 978-1-905038-25-1)
- Aya Takeo volume 1 (with Lloyd Prentice, Sweatdrop Studios, May 2009, ISBN 978-1-905038-21-3)
- Strike Force (I Hero series by Steve Skidmore and Steve Barlow, Franklin Watts, April 2009, ISBN 978-0-7496-9036-6)
- Space Rescue (I Hero series by Steve Skidmore and Steve Barlow, Franklin Watts, April 2009, ISBN 978-0-7496-9035-9)
- Drop Dead Monstrous (multiple artists; Sweatdrop Studios, November 2008, ISBN 978-1-905038-17-6)
- Once Upon A Time (Sweatdrop Studios, October 2008, ISBN 978-1-905038-15-2)
- Save The Empire (I Hero series by Steve Skidmore and Steve Barlow, Franklin Watts, October 2008, ISBN 978-0-7496-8265-1)
- Pirate Gold (I Hero series by Steve Skidmore and Steve Barlow, Franklin Watts, October 2008, ISBN 978-0-7496-8264-4)
- Comic Book Tattoo (multiple artists, Image Comics, ISBN 978-1-58240-964-1)
- Be Creative (Infinite Ideas Manga Life, April 2008, ISBN 978-1-905940-77-6)
- Find True Love (Infinite Ideas Manga Life, April 2008, ISBN 978-1-905940-78-3)
- Death or Glory (I Hero series by Steve Skidmore and Steve Barlow, Franklin Watts, October 2007, ISBN 0-7496-7664-7)
- Viking Blood (I Hero series by Steve Skidmore and Steve Barlow, Franklin Watts, October 2007, ISBN 0-7496-7665-5)
- Gorgon's Cave (I Hero series by Steve Skidmore and Steve Barlow, Franklin Watts, October 2007, ISBN 0-7496-7666-3)
- Code Mission (I Hero series by Steve Skidmore and Steve Barlow, Franklin Watts, October 2007, ISBN 0-7496-7667-1)
- 500 Manga Characters (Sweatdrop Studios, Ilex, June 2007, ISBN 978-1-905814-03-9)
- Manga Shakespeare: Romeo and Juliet (Self Made Hero, January 2007, ISBN 0-9552856-0-7)
- Pink is for Girls (multiple artists, October 2006, ISBN 978-1-905038-07-7)
- Cyborg Butterfly (in MangaQuake No. 2, 2006)
- Tokyopop Rising Stars of Manga: UK & Ireland volume 1 (multiple artists; June 2008, ISBN 978-1-59816-464-0)
- Draw Manga (Sweatdrop Studios, New Holland, October 2006, ISBN 1-84537-416-9)
- Sugardrops (multiple artists; Sweatdrop Studios, July 2004, ISBN 1-905038-00-3)
