= SelfMadeHero =

UK-based independent publishing house

- Parent company: Metro Media Ltd
- Founded: 2007
- Country of origin: United Kingdom
- Headquarters location: London
- Distribution: Abrams Books (US); Canadian Manda Group (Canada); Abrams & Chronicle Books (UK); Thames & Hudson (Australia)
- Key people: Emma Hayley
- Fiction genres: Graphic novels
- Imprints: Manga Shakespeare; Eye Classics; Crime Classics; Graphic Biography
- Official website: www.selfmadehero.com

SelfMadeHero is an independent publishing house which specialises in adapting works of literature, as well as producing original graphic novels.

SelfMadeHero's books are distributed in the UK by Abrams & Chronicle Books and in the U.S. by Abrams Books.

== History ==
SelfMadeHero was founded in February 2007 by Emma Hayley, and launched with two lines: Manga Shakespeare, featuring works based on the Bard but with different settings – mainly Japan in the past and future, and Eye Classics, which are adaptations of great classic works, such as those of Poe and Kafka.

In 2008 Emma Hayley was named UK Young Publishing Entrepreneur of the Year as part of the British Book Awards.

In 2009 SelfMadeHero expanded to include graphic adaptations of Sherlock Holmes, including Hound of the Baskervilles and A Study in Scarlet, and later several works by H.P. Lovecraft, including the anthology LOVECRAFT by I.N.J. Culbard. It also began publishing the Graphic Biography series with Johnny Cash: I See a Darkness, which has further expanded to tell the fascinating life stories of era-defining pop-culture icons such as Hunter S. Thompson and Nick Cave.

Since 2010 SelfMadeHero has been publishing original material, notably Glyn Dillon's The Nao of Brown, The Motherless Oven trilogy by Rob Davis. In 2011 the company received the Kitschies Black Tentacle award.

=== Graphic Anthology Programme (GAP) and Catalyst ===
With support from Arts Council England SelfMadeHero launched the Graphic Anthology Programme (GAP) in February 2021. The GAP was a free, public programme that eventually selected 7 applicants for “an intensive 12 weeks of comics mentoring and masterclasses.” This resulted in the anthology Catalyst being published in October 2021, which featured 11 short stories, including the works produced by the 7 chosen GAP participants. The Cartoon Museum also hosted a temporary digital exhibition promoting Catalyst in 2022, titled Catalyst – the Online Exhibition, and Arts Council England also host an online exhibition titled Comics as a catalyst for change.

As well as its central theme of "catalyst", the GAP and the published anthology have both received recognition and praise for the diversity of the creators involved.

=== 2023 First Graphic Novel Award ===
In June 2023, entries opened for the 2023 First Graphic Novel Award. The award was originally founded by Myriad Editions in 2012, and is now described as :

[...]a partnership between the Cartoon Museum, the publisher SelfMadeHero, and independent graphic novel editor Corinne Pearlman, former Creative Director at Myriad Editions, with thanks to generous support from the Authors’ Licensing and Collecting Society (ALCS) and The bks Agency, sponsors of the £500 prize for the winning entry.

Entries are set to close in September 2023, with the winner to be announced in December. Among the judges is SelfMadeHero founder Emma Hayley. SelfMadeHero are also offering a publishing contract as one of the two prizes awarded to the winning author or team, the other being the £500 bursary donated by The bks Agency.

== Bibliography ==
=== Manga Shakespeare ===
The adaptations of Shakespeare's plays were made by Richard Appignanesi (who previously worked on Icon Books' Introducing... series), with the art created by UK-based manga artists who came to prominence via Tokyopop's Rising Stars of Manga (United Kingdom & Ireland) competition, their work for Sweatdrop Studios or London manga collective Umisen Yamisen.

Of SelfMadeHero's two initial lines, it was Manga Shakespeare and its first two titles (Hamlet and Romeo and Juliet, which were published simultaneously in January 2007) that contributed most to establishing the company. This foundation later allowed SelfMadeHero to branch out into other genres and lines.

Title	Artist	Released	ISBN	Ref
Hamlet	Emma Vieceli	February 2007	ISBN 978-0-9552856-1-5	
Romeo and Juliet	Sonia Leong	February 2007	ISBN 978-0-9552856-0-8	
The Tempest	Paul Duffield	September 2007	ISBN 978-0-9552856-0-8	
Richard III	Patrick Warren	September 2007	ISBN 978-0-9552856-3-9	
A Midsummer Night's Dream	Kate Brown	February 2008	ISBN 978-0-9552856-4-6	
Julius Caesar	Mustashrik	June 2008	ISBN 978-0-9552856-5-3	
Macbeth	Robert Deas	June 2008	ISBN 978-0-9552856-6-0	
As You Like It	Chie Kutsuwada	January 2009	ISBN 978-0-9558169-0-1	
Othello	Ryuta Osada	January 2009	ISBN 978-0-9558169-5-6	
Henry VIII	Patrick Warren	May 2009	ISBN 978-1-906838-02-7	
King Lear	ILYA	May 2009	ISBN 978-0-9558169-7-0	
Much Ado About Nothing	Emma Vieceli	May 2009	ISBN 978-0-9558169-6-3	
The Merchant of Venice	Faye Yong	September 2009	ISBN 978-0-9558169-1-8	
Twelfth Night	Nana Li	September 2009	ISBN 978-0-9558169-9-4	

=== Eye Classics ===
The creators are drawn from a British comic background (in particular Nevermore) but also include screenwriters and more traditional artists.

Title	Author	Adaptation	Artist	Released	ISBN	Ref
Nevermore (anthology)	Edgar Allan Poe	various		October 2007	ISBN 978-0-9552856-8-4	
The Master and Margarita	Mikhail Bulgakov	Andrzej Klimowski	Danusia Schejbal	May 2008	ISBN 978-0-9552856-7-7	
The Trial	Franz Kafka	David Zane Mairowitz	Chantal Montellier	March 2008	ISBN 978-0-9552856-9-1	
The Picture of Dorian Gray	Oscar Wilde	Ian Edginton	I. N. J. Culbard	September 2008	ISBN 978-0-9558169-3-2	
At the Mountains of Madness	H. P. Lovecraft	I. N. J. Culbard		October 2010	ISBN 978-1-906838-12-6	
The Castle	Franz Kafka	David Zane Mairowitz,	Jaromir99	November 2013	ISBN 978-1-906838-67-6	
The Shadow Out of Time	H. P. Lovecraft	I. N. J. Culbard		November 2013	ISBN 978-1906838683	
The Man Who Laughs	Victor Hugo	David Hine	Mark Stafford	November 2013	ISBN 978-1-906838-58-4	

=== Crime Classics ===
The Crime Classics line began with a set of four adaptations of the Arthur Conan Doyle stories, adapted by Ian Edginton, with art by I. N. J. Culbard:

Title	Author	Artist	Released	ISBN	Ref
The Hound of the Baskervilles	Ian Edginton	I. N. J. Culbard	May 2009	ISBN 978-0-9558169-7-0	
A Study in Scarlet	Ian Edginton	I. N. J. Culbard	May 2009	ISBN 978-0-9558169-6-3	
The Sign of the Four	Ian Edginton	I. N. J. Culbard	September 2009	ISBN 978-0-9558169-1-8	
The Valley of Fear	Ian Edginton	I. N. J. Culbard	September 2009	ISBN 978-0-9558169-9-4	

Rachel Cooke reviewed A Study in Scarlet for The Observer and concluded:

Culbard and Edginton are adept at concision, leaving out nothing that is crucial and excising much that isn't. I relished every page and thought how this book would be the perfect primer for any child whose parents feel them to be just on the cusp of potential Holmes worship.

=== Graphic Biography ===
Title	Author	Artist	Released	ISBN	Ref
Johnny Cash: I See a Darkness	Reinhard Kleist		October 2009	ISBN 0-8109-8463-6	
Gonzo: A Graphic Biography of Hunter S. Thompson	Will Bingley	Antony Hope-Smith	October 2010	ISBN 978-1906838119	
Kiki de Montparnasse	José-Louis Bocquet	Catel Muller	February 2011	ISBN 978-1906838256	
Baby's in Black: The Story of Astrid Kirchherr & Stuart Sutcliffe	Arne Bellstorf		March 2011	ISBN 978-1906838263	
Castro	Reinhard Kleist		July 2011	ISBN 978-1906838324	
Hellraisers	Robert Sellers	JAKe	October 2011	ISBN 978-1906838362	
A Chinese Life	Li Kunwu & Philippe Ôtié	Li Kunwu	July 2012	ISBN 978-1906838553	
The Boxer	Reinhard Kleist		March 2014	ISBN 978-1906838775	
An Olympic Dream: The Story of Samia Yusuf Omar	Reinhard Kleist		March 2016	ISBN 978-1910593097	
Agatha: The Real Life of Agatha Christie	Anne Martinetti & Guillaume Lebeau	Alexandre Franc	May 2016	ISBN 978-1910593110	
The Trial of Roger Casement	Fionnuala Doran		September 2016	ISBN 978-1910593202	
Haddon Hall: When David Invented Bowie	Néjib		February 2017	ISBN 978-1910593264	
Nick Cave: Mercy on Me	Reinhard Kleist		September 2017	ISBN 978-1910593363	
Guantánamo Kid: The True Story of Mohammed El-Gharani	Jérôme Tubiana	Alexandre Franc	March 2019	ISBN 978-1910593660	
Isadora	Julie Birmant	Clément Oubrerie	September 2019	ISBN 978-1910593691	
Mozart in Paris	Frantz Duchazeau		September 2019	ISBN 978-1910593721	
Zátopek	Jan Novák	Jaromír 99	October 2020	ISBN 978-1910593882	
Buñuel: In the Labyrinth of the Turtles	Fermín Solís		April 2021	ISBN 978-1910593844	
Orwell	Pierre Christin	Sébastien Verdier	May 2021	ISBN 978-1910593875	
Knock Out!	Reinhard Kleist		July 2021	ISBN 978-1910593868	
Alice Guy: First Lady of Film	José-Louis Bocquet	Catel Muller	July 2022	ISBN 978-1914224034	

== Awards and nominations ==
Year	Award	Category	Book	Creator(s)	Result
2011	Kitschies	The Black Tentacle	N/A	N/A	Won
2013	Angoulême International Comics Festival	Special Jury Prize	The Nao of Brown	Glyn Dillon	Won
2015	British Comic Awards	Best Book	The Motherless Oven	Rob Davis	Won
2016	Eisner Award	Best Graphic Album	Ruins	Peter Kuper	Won
2020	Angoulême International Comics Festival	SNCF Polar Prize 2020	Tumult	John Harris Dunning & Michael Kennedy	Nominated
2020	Excelsior Award	Excelsior Award Black	Guantánamo Kid: The True Story of Mohammed El-Gharani	Jérôme Tubiana & Alexandre Franc	Won

== See also ==
- Classical Comics, another new British company producing graphic novel adaptations of great works, including some of the same Shakespeare plays
- Classics Illustrated, a similar venture from the 1940s to 1960s
- Pendulum Press, a similar venture from the 1970s
- Marvel Classics Comics, a similar venture from 1976 to 1978
- Marvel Illustrated, Marvel Comics imprint adapting classic literature
- Graphic Classics
- The Manga Bible, an adaptation by Siku
