= Sweatdrop Studios =

British comics publishing house

Sweatdrop Studios are a collective of UK Original English-language manga creators who publish British small press comics.

== Overview ==
The UK's first home-based independent Original English-language manga publisher and distributor, Sweatdrop Studios publish and distribute manga produced solely by creators living within the UK. Their comics are available for from their own website or at UK anime conventions that they attend.

The majority of works published by Sweatdrop are amateur ventures; the artists/authors do not make a living through profits, and produce and sell their works in their own time. There are, however, a few exceptions to this, such as Draw Manga (ISBN 1845374169), a professional book published under the Sweatdrop Studios name and also 'Manga Life', a series of self-help books for Infinite Ideas.

Sweatdrop is frequently mentioned in the UK's only anime, manga and Asian cinema magazine, Neo, in which members regularly produce tutorials. Members have also featured in other magazines, Hayden Scott-Baron was featured in Advanced Photoshop magazine. Joanna Zhou & Emma Vieceli have been featured artists in ImagineFX.

The group is known for running workshops and panels at numerous events (see also workshops listed below).

== History ==
The Studio was founded in 2001, by a co-operative of four independent UK manga artists, who, until then, had been self-publishing at a small-press level individually. These artists were Hayden Scott-Baron, Laura Watton, Sam Brown and Foxy, who had met via their attendance at UK manga conventions. Fehed Said, Selina Dean and Aleister Kelman had also been members when the Studio formed, although they were not present at the conventions.

Members of the Studio participate in its activities to varying degrees, depending on their personal circumstances. These activities include: publishing comics, participating in writing manga drawing tutorials in magazines, attending conventions and events, running workshops and panels and administration of their website ( http://www.sweatdrop.com/ ) and its forum.

== Notable achievements of individual Sweatdrop members ==
- Emma Vieceli achieved a runner-up position in the 1st Rising Stars of Manga United Kingdom & Ireland competition. She recently worked on a manga adaptation of William Shakespeare's Hamlet for Self Made Hero. Amongst other projects, she has worked on the art and design of the collectible card game Herocard Cyberspace from Tablestar Games, was also one of the Head Contributors to Draw Manga Sweatdrop Studios from New Holland Publishers (UK) Ltd, and has published the first graphic novel volume of her manga style comic, Dragon Heir (ISBN 1905038143). She won the Neo magazine manga competition 2006 with her 5-page comic 'Consideration'. Between June & November 2007 alongside T4's Stuart Claw she hosted Anime Network, a two-hour daily segment licensed to Propeller TV. She has also worked on the cover to 'eV' and a short story in 'Princess Ai: Rumors From The Other Side', both published by Tokyopop. Illustrated 'Precious Things' for 'Tori Amos' Comic Book Tattoo a 480-page anthology published by Image Comics. She has also created Violet for The DFC which was previewed in The Guardian Comic on 31 May 2008.
- Sonia Leong achieved 2nd place in TOKYOPOP's inaugural Rising Stars of Manga United Kingdom & Ireland competition. Her involvement in a Wacom campaign has appeared in major German magazines such as Animania which used her official art to promote the wildly successful Pimp My Character contest. She is also one of the Head Contributors to Draw Manga Sweatdrop Studios from New Holland Publishers (UK) Ltd, has participated in the conceptual art and design of the collectible card game Herocard Cyberspace from Tablestar Games worked on an adaptation of William Shakespeare's Romeo & Juliet for Self Made Hero, is currently the Art Director for the 'Aya. Takeo' webcomic has illustrated a series of children's books for Franklin Watts Ltd. as well as 'Manga Life', a series of self-help books for Infinite Ideas. Leong also illustrated 'Siren' for 'Tori Amos' Comic Book Tattoo and recently contributed a chapter to Tokyopop's Domo: The Manga.
- Joanna Zhou has been a contributor to ImagineFX magazine, covering manga related topics in the Artist Q&A section since the magazine began. Her step-by-step workshops from issues 001 & 004 were also included on the ImagineFX tutorial DVD that is available with each issue. She is a featured artist for Tokyotoys, her short comic Cybercrush won the Children's Storyboard Competition at The International Manga and Anime Festival in 2005, she also created the mascot for Japan EX London. Her 5-page comic Karma won the Neo magazine manga competition 2006, she achieved a runner-up position in the 2nd Rising Stars of Manga United Kingdom & Ireland competition, her satirical strip Carlos & Sakura featured in the Mammoth Book of Best New Manga. She has also worked with Momiji designing a set of six friendship Dolls as well as a designing a set of Momiji Zakka, a collection of little gifts based on her friendship Dolls. In November 2011 she launched 'Maqaroon' a lifestyle brand based on street fashion, cute animals and manga art.
- Morag Lewis has published four graphic novel volumes of her completed manga style comic, Looking for the Sun (ISBN 1905038038, ISBN 1-905038-04-6, ISBN 1-905038-11-9, ISBN 1-905038-13-5), issue 15 of which was reviewed in SFX magazine She won first prize in the Character Brief Category at The International Manga and Anime Festival in 2006. She also achieved a runner-up position in the 2nd Rising Stars of Manga United Kingdom & Ireland competition. Her story 'Reya' which originated in the 'Stardust' Anthology, has been picked up for publication by Markosia Enterprises.
- Hayden Scott-Baron has published Digital Manga Techniques (ISBN 071367475X, 2005), and Manga Clip Art (ISBN 1904705839, 2006) and has been involved in the production of Making Anime: Create mesmerising manga-style animation with pencils, paint and pixels (ISBN 0240520459). In 2007, he achieved 2nd Place position in the 3rd Rising Stars of Manga United Kingdom & Ireland competition.

== Notable achievements of Sweatdrop Studios as a group ==
- Sweatdrop had a noticeable presence in the Anime/Comic Village of the London MCM Expo - London's Comic Con, a Bi-annual event held at the ExCeL Centre, Royal Victoria Dock, London, where they ran the art competition that has been sponsored by Future Publishings ImagineFX magazine Wacom, e-frontier, Letraset, Momiji and Ambient Design Ltd.
- The group has published a handful of manga style comic anthologies: 'Sugardrops' (2004), 'Stardust' (2006), which has been reviewed in Neo magazine as well as 'Pink is for Girls' (2006), 'Blue is for Boys' (2006) 'Cold Sweat & Tears' (2007), 'Drop Dead Monstrous' (2008), 'Talking to Strangers' (2009) and 'Telling Tales' (2010).
- The group also attends UK manga/anime conventions such as Amecon and Ayacon on a regular basis. They run the Artist's Alley, take panel discussions on how to produce manga styled comics, and hold a table in the Dealer's Room. They have also been to numerous smaller events to take part in workshops and panels.
- Sweatdrop members have attended promotional events run by publisher Tokyopop, in UK bookstores, to give advice on manga styled drawing.
- Some members of the group have participated in the art and design of the collectible card game Herocard Cyberspace.
- The group ran a monthly manga tutorial section in Neo magazine, featuring several of their members.
- The group ran numerous workshops and seminars at the huge Artists and Illustrators Exhibition in London in 2005, and have also had a tutorial published in Artists and Illustrators Magazine.

== List of current Sweatdrop members ==
Pen name	Real name	Profile
Bex	Rebecca Burgess	
Dock	Hayden Scott-Baron	
Emma Vieceli		
Irina Richards		
Joanna Zhou		
Morag Lewis		
Ruth Keattch		
Shazleen Khan		
Sonia Leong		

As a collaboration, members of Sweatdrop participate in active discussion on their forum ( http://www.sweatdrop.com/forum/ ). Emoticons are unique on this forum, instead of yellow smileys, blue sweatdrops are used in keeping with the namesake.
