= Manga Barcelona =

Anime convention in Spain

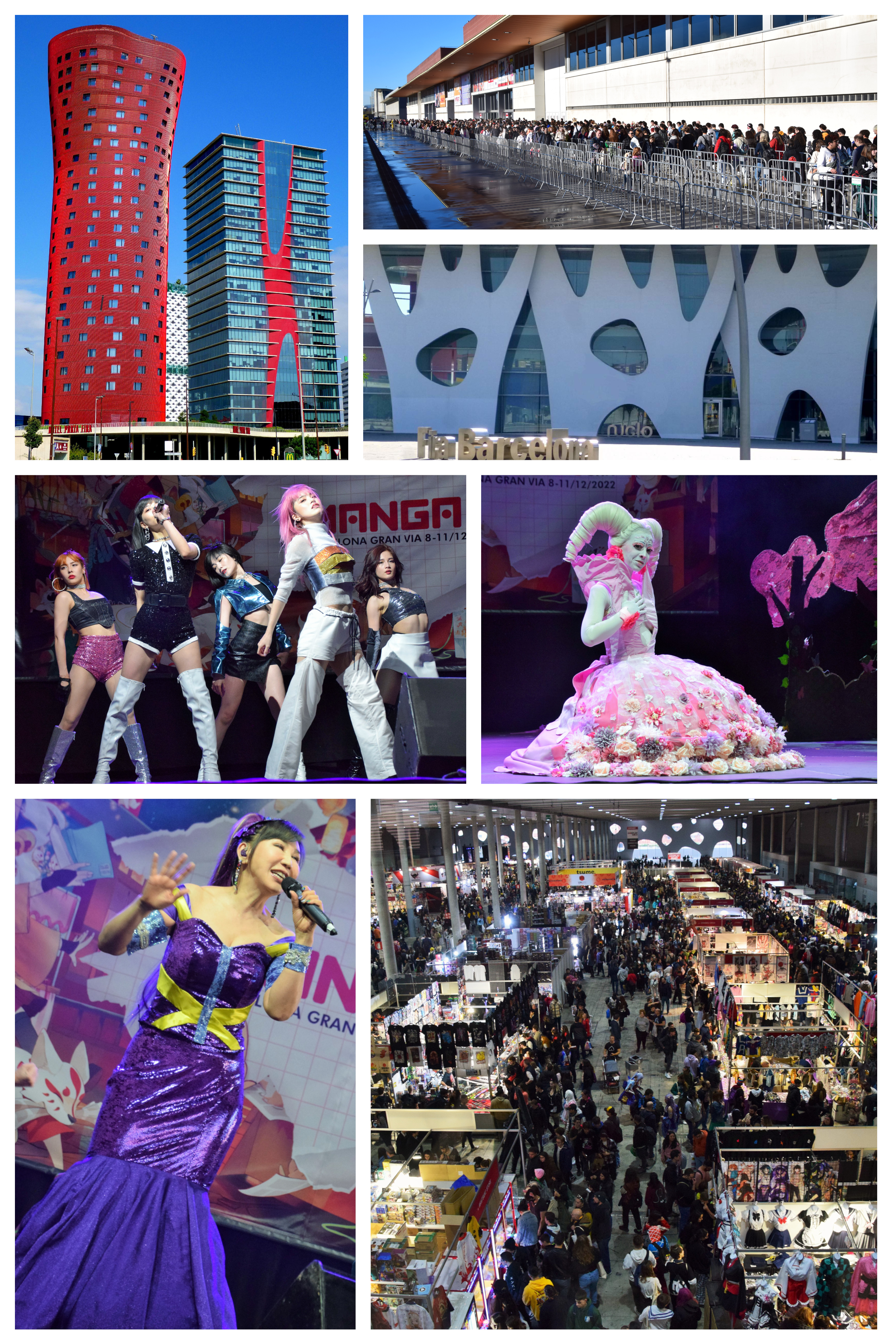
- Pictures from 28th Manga Barcelona in 2022
- Status: Active
- Genre: Anime, Manga
- Date: beginning december
- Frequency: annual
- Venue: Fira de Barcelona, Montjuïc
- Locations: Barcelona, Catalonia
- Country: Spain
- Years active: 1995–present
- Inaugurated: 1995
- Attendance: 163,000 (2022)
- Organizer: Ficomic
- Website: www.manga-barcelona.com

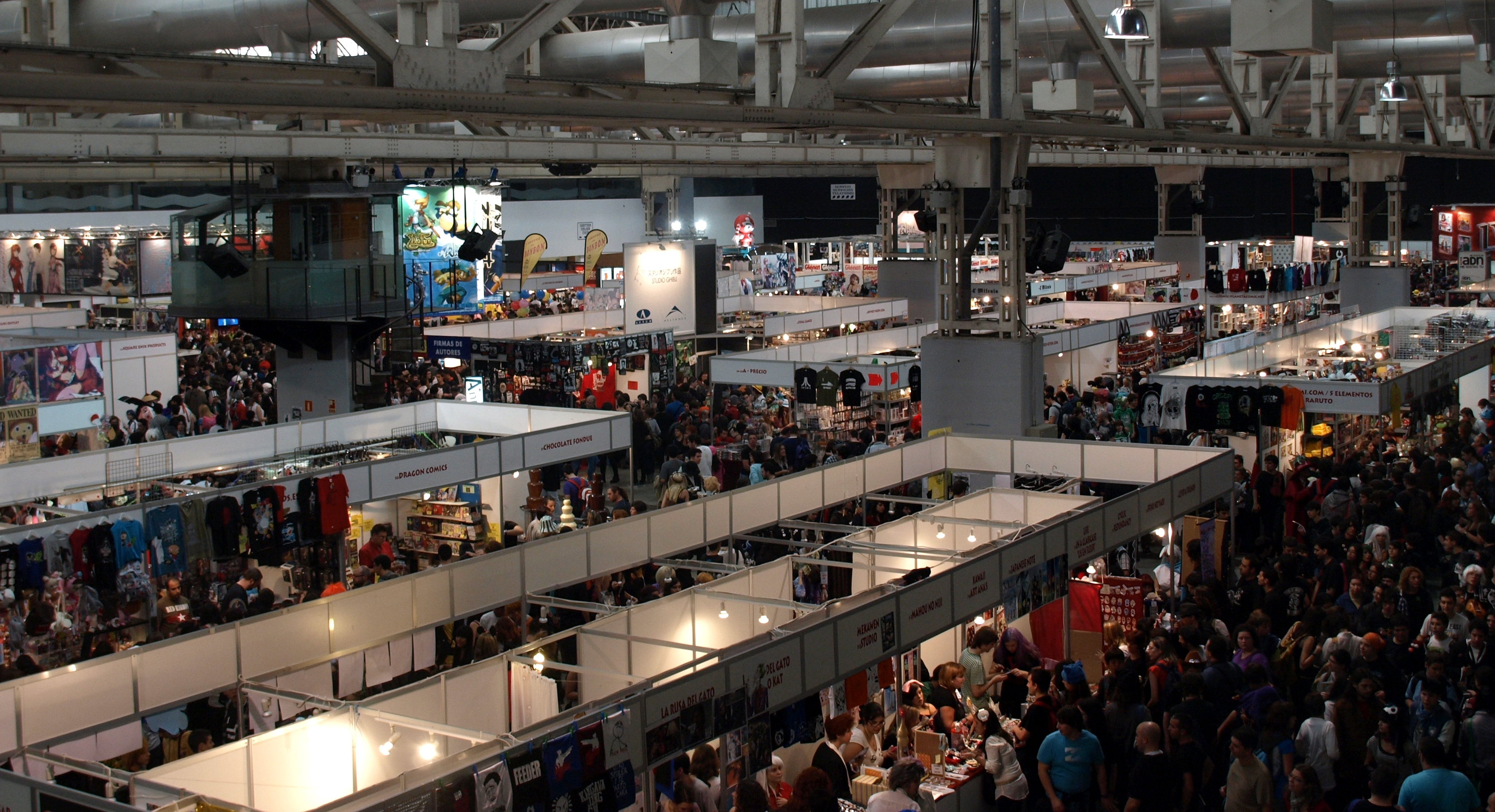
Salón del Manga de Barcelona 2011

Manga Barcelona, formerly known until 2018 as Saló del Manga de Barcelona (Spanish: Salón del Manga de Barcelona) is a Spanish anime and manga convention held annually in Barcelona, and is the largest anime convention in Spain and the second largest in all Europe.

== Activities ==
- World Cosplay Summit, Spain Preliminaries.
- Cosplay and Karaoke competitions, European Cosplay Gathering (ECG) & EuroCosplay & WCS preliminaries.
- Video Games.
- Anime projections and conferences.
- Matsuri and Japanese culture workshops.
- Japanese cuisine.

Event history
Year	Official name	Date	Location	Attendance	Notable guests
1995	Saló del Manga i el Videojoc	October 27–29	Estació de França (Barcelona)	1,000	
1996	II Saló del Manga	October 28–30	Estació de França (Barcelona)	3,000	
1997	III Saló del Manga		La Farga (L'Hospitalet)	7,000	Masami Suda
1998	IV Saló del Manga	October 30 - November 1	La Farga (L'Hospitalet)	10,000	Shingo Araki
1999	V Saló del Manga, el Còmic, el Coleccionisme, els Videojocs i l'Animació	October 29–31	La Farga (L'Hospitalet)	20,000	Haruhiko Mikimoto
2000	VI Saló del Manga	November 3–5	La Farga (L'Hospitalet)	30,000	
2001	VII Saló del Manga	October 26–28	La Farga (L'Hospitalet)	35,000	Akemi Takada
2002	VIII Saló del Manga	October 25–27	La Farga (L'Hospitalet)	39,000	Yuu Watase, Studio Pierrot
2003	IX Saló del Manga	October 24–26	La Farga (L'Hospitalet)	43,000	Yutaka Izubuchi, Yuji Moriyama, Studio Pierrot
2004	X Saló del Manga	October 29 - November 1	La Farga (L'Hospitalet)	58,000	Mari Kitayama, Studio Pierrot
2005	XI Saló del Manga	October 29 - November 1	La Farga (L'Hospitalet)	63,000	Hiroto Tanaka
2006	XII Saló del Manga	October 27–29	La Farga (L'Hospitalet)	58,000	Masakazu Katsura, Atsuko Nakajima, Tachibana Higuchi, Hideshi Hino, Monkey Punch, BLOOD, Hirobobu Kageyama, Akira Kushida
2007	XIII Saló del Manga	November 1–4	La Farga (L'Hospitalet)	67,000	Shigeyasu Yamauchi, Range Murata, Nobuo Yamada, Fréderic Boilet
2008	XIV Saló del Manga	October 30 - November 2	La Farga, Poliesportiu del Centre, Centre Cultural Barradas (L'Hospitalet)	60,000	Kaiji Kawaguchi, Ian Lovett, JAM PROJECT, Junko Mizuno, Michihiko Suwa, Tamakasa Sakurai, Yoshikazu Yasuhiko
2009	XV Saló del Manga	October 29 - November 1	La Farga (L'Hospitalet)	62,000	Issei Eifuku, Taiyou Matsumoto, Ken Niimura, Misako Aoki, YÛ Kimura, Takamasa Sakurai, Yuka
2010	XVI Saló del Manga	October 29 - November 1	La Farga (L'Hospitalet)	65,000	Takashi Shimizu, Hideshi Hino, Wataru Yoshizumi, Izumi Matsumoto, Kayono, Kamiyama Kenji, Peter Molyneux
2011	XVII Saló del Manga	October 29 - November 1	La Farga (L'Hospitalet)	65,000	JYJ, Carlos Rubio López de la Llave, Cécile Corbeil, Fujo Hirata, Hiroshi Hirata, Kazue Kato, Keiichi Hara, Morinosuke Kawaguchi
2012	XVIII Saló del Manga	November 1–4	Fira de Barcelona Palau 2 (Barcelona)	112,000	Hiro Mashima, Toshiyuki Kubooka, Masao Maruyama, Hiroshi Matsuyama, Yoshisuke Suga
2013	XIX Saló del Manga	October 31 - November 3	Fira de Barcelona Palau 1-2 (Barcelona)	115,000	Aiko Nakano, Li Kunwu, Shintarō Kago
2014	XX Saló del Manga	October 30– November 2	Fira de Barcelona Palau 1-2 and Plaça Univers (Barcelona)	130,000	Kengo Hanazawa, Takeshi Obata, Takehiko Inoue, Ken Niimura, Hideo Baba (Tales Of), Junichi Masuda & Shigeru Ohmori (Pokémon), Masayuki Hirano (Bandai Namco)
2015	XXI Saló del Manga	October 29 - November 1	Fira de Barcelona Palau 1-2-4 and Plaça Univers (Barcelona)	137,000	Inio Asano, Io Sakisaka, Tetsuya Tashiro
2016	XXII Saló del Manga	October 29 - November 1	Fira de Barcelona Palau 1-2-4-5 and Plaça Univers (Barcelona)	142,000	Banana Yoshimoto, Mitsuyo Kakuta, Junji Ito, Toshio Maeda, Hidenori Kusaka, Satoshi Yamamoto, Akihiro Hino, Band-Maid, Yoshisuke Suga
2017	XXIII Saló del Manga	November 1 - November 5	Fira de Barcelona Palau 1-2-3-4-5 and Plaça Univers (Barcelona)	148,000	Robico(My Little Monster), Yoshiaki Sukeno(Twin Star Exorcists), Yoko Kamio, Masao Maruyama (film producer), DJ Kentaro, Azumi Inoue
2018	XXIV Saló del Manga	November 1 - November 4	Fira de Barcelona Palau 1-2-3-4-5 and Plaça Univers (Barcelona)	150,000+	Daisuke Hagiwara, Emika Kamieda, Akira Himekawa, Elsa Brants, Nagabe, Takashi Hatsushiba, Paru Itagaki, Nana Kitade, Eiki Eiki, Taishi Zaou, Masaki Satô, Junnyan, Luiza
2019	XXV Manga Barcelona	October 31 - November 3	Fira de Barcelona	152,000	AKB48, Masayuki Satō, Hiroyuki Sakurada
2022	XXVIII Manga Barcelona	December 8 - December 11	Fira de Barcelona	163,000	Mahousyoujoninaritai, FAKY, Yoko Takahashi
