= Honors colleges and programs =

Special accommodation constituent programs at universities

An honors program is an undergraduate program in an institute of higher education providing exceptional scholars with supplemental or alternative curricular and non-curricular programs, privileges, special access, scholarships, and distinguished recognition. Originating in the United States, an honors college, typically a unit within a larger institution, offers honors programs to all students. Honors programs may be offered at public and private universities and community colleges.

== History ==
=== Public universities ===
Higher education policymakers in state governments overwhelmingly support honors programs not only to better serve exceptional young scholars but also to attract and retain them in their respective public education systems.

Many honors programs began after World War II, when a surge of highly qualified students seeking higher education exceeded the capacities of highly selective private universities. Current modeled honors programs began in public universities around the beginning of the second half of the 20th century. The first of the current type can be traced to one that was founded at Michigan State University on November 9, 1956, Based on that foundation, Michigan State University-Oakland, now Oakland University, was the first university founded with assistance of an honors college student advisory group made up of honors students from that first honors college, and was announced on January 3, 1957. Four honors college were founded by 1960, including that at Wesleyan University, the University of Missouri, and at the University of Oregon – Robert D. Clark Honors College. (Note: While the 1935 founding of Plan II Honors at the University of Texas predates the 1960 founding of Clark Honors College at Oregon, Plan II was neither structured nor named as a college. Ergo, Clark Honors College carries the distinction of being the oldest honors college in the US.) By 1990, honors programs became ubiquitous and evolved. Peterson's Smart Choices: Guide to Honors Programs & Colleges, in 2005, indicated that there were nearly 600 honors-type programs at both two- and four-year institutions in the United States. (Note: Peterson's Smart Choices: Honors Programs & Colleges (4th ed.), compiled by Joan Digby, PhD (née Joan Hildreth Weiss; born 1942), Peterson's for the National Collegiate Honors Council (2005); OCLC 62073602) A 2008 survey of honors programs affiliated with the National Collegiate Honors Council reflects that much of the growth in honors programs is recent, with over 60% of honors programs having been established since 1994.

However, earlier honors programs – those founded before World War II – include Plan II Honors at The University of Texas at Austin, still in existence, which is an interdisciplinary liberal arts degree itself. The program began with 50 students who were given a broader, less specialized, liberal arts curriculum as opposed to that of the traditional Bachelor of Arts degree (Plan I). Michigan's LSA Honors Program, another earlier program, was founded around 1958.

Outside of the United States, honors colleges can also be found at Thompson Rivers University, the National University of Singapore, and the University of Macau.

=== Private universities ===
One notable early honors program at a private institution, that exists today, is that of Swarthmore College, founded in 1922 by its then President Frank Aydelotte and initially modeled on the tutorial system of Oxford University. (Note: The oldest honors program still in existence is that of Swarthmore College, founded one hundred and four years ago (in 1922).)

The more recent increase of honors programs at private institutions, beginning around the start of the 21st century, is somewhat a response to the success of honors programs and colleges of public universities. Smaller private institutions, in particular, are desirous of increasing admission yields of exceptional undergraduate scholars being lured by other competing institutions, public and private.

=== Interinstitutional and multinational ===
Global Honors College, with its interinstitutional and multinational honors program, was organized by Waseda University (Tokyo). The college convenes faculty and undergraduate students from universities worldwide to conduct joint, structured, and sustained investigations of enduring and emerging global issues. Students from public and private institutions (including Columbia, Harvard, MIT, Yale, Peking, Korea, Waseda, and others) participate in a Global Seminar – an annual, summer-long intensive course on environmental sustainability matters ranging from food and agriculture to natural disasters.

== Institutional objectives ==
=== Recruiting exceptional students ===
Recruiting exceptional students is an impetus for offering Honors programs. In a study of graduation rates by Alexander Astin, 66% of the variation in retention rates between institutions can be explained by differences in the quality of entering students. And, to some extent, honors colleges and programs attract students who contribute to higher retention rates.

=== Student retention ===
Engineering educators Phillip Wankat and Frank Oreovicz assert that offering honors programs (and merit societies) during the first year, or early in the second year, is critical. This is when losses in enrollment are highest, particularly in rigorous academic disciplines such as engineering. Wankat and Oreovicz insist that any sort of extra attention – athletics, clubs, informal socials, small first-year seminars, eating meals with professors, visiting professors homes, and the like – helps retain students who have the makings of good scholars. In the case of undergraduate engineering, extra attention – including offerings of honors programs for undergraduate engineering majors – also helps keep potential engineering majors from changing majors.

Along with Wankat and Oreovicz, there is an ongoing debate on how social media plays a role in the retention of honors students. Corinne R. Green at Purdue University attests that "in the face of new technologies, honors faculty and staff should begin understanding the way their students interact with these technologies to apply them appropriately within the honors experience". Green believes that within the future of honors colleges and programs, there needs to be a push and effort to integrate social media in a way that not only shows off the honors colleges in a good light but also can be properly applied to the curriculum without limiting learning. Green has also taken from others to say that the debate is at a stand-still due to some believing that social media can be incorporated beneficially.

=== Enrichment vs. acceleration ===
Research that supports pedagogical approaches are mostly based on empirical evidence and theory. Providing great education and experiencing it is not an exact science. While many successful institutions of higher learning share consensus on a number of pedagogical approaches, they are not always uniform.

For honors colleges and programs that offer exclusive accredited coursework and labs for participants, the style often places less emphasis on testing and more on personable interaction, such as small seminar-styled classes and mentoring and academic apprenticeship. Usually, the objective is to cultivate a more enriched learning experience. But enrichment is not the objective of all honors colleges and programs. Engineering, technical fields, undergraduate sciences, and pre-med, for instance, might place more focus on acceleration, in lieu of enrichment, with the goal of taking the student further. In accounting and engineering, for example, professional accreditation is paramount and the academic coursework required is great. For fast and efficient learners, acceleration might be more ideal. Moreover, accounting and engineering degrees represent professional education. Students on professional tracks likely aspire to start careers as soon as possible.

Outside honors colleges and programs, not all liberal arts oriented institutions avoid acceleration. Reed College, for example, internationally known for its liberal arts, offers acceleration for its fast learners – for various reasons. In many cases, concerns over enrichment vs. acceleration are moot because students at the collegiate level can determine their workload by the classes they choose.

==== Economic influences on enrichment vs. acceleration ====
The balance between enrichment and acceleration can sometimes fluctuate, correlated to the economy and job market. In a poor economy, enrichment, for those who can afford it, might be more desirable. Alternatively, an extended period (a decade, for instance) in a weak economy with a poor job market can serve as a reality-check for liberal arts programs, even those of international rank, motivating academicians and students to surrender liberal arts enrichment in favor of professional education.

==== Funding requirements of enrichment vs. acceleration ====
From a funding perspective, enrichment is often more expensive than acceleration. With acceleration – for math and engineering, as an example – professors simply cover more advanced material at a faster pace, using resources in hand and curricula already developed. By contrast, enrichment often requires extra materials and resources, particularly during a launch phase.

== Considerations and criticism ==
=== Funding ===
Inadequate funding of honors colleges and programs can lead to a system of borrowing faculty members from elsewhere within an institution, which, on one level, has the effect of shortchanging undergraduates who are not in the program. Along with that, since money is such an important factor when it comes to honors colleges, they try to attract donors to help with said inadequate funding. This donor funding may be either through donations (whether it be alumni, celebs, or other), or fundraising in direct support to the honors colleges specifically. Notwithstanding concerns over funding, honors programs, initially (in the early 1960s), served as less costly alternatives to scholarships when competing for exceptional students. However, as programs have evolved, scholarships have become more universally prevalent.

=== Isolation ===
Attracting exceptional young scholars is a goal of most if not all universities. Exceptionally bright, motivated students who perform at high levels cultivate strong leaning experiences for university communities. The students of many honors programs and colleges usually take the same classes as regular students. But, to the extent that students of honors colleges and programs are isolated among themselves – by way of exclusive classes or activities or living quarters – the overall benefits might accrue in isolation, while at the same time, can also be a drain on quality academic environment for the larger student population who otherwise would benefit from more interaction with exceptional students. Further to that end, Michael Harris, in one of his blogs about his experience teaching in an honors college, expressed concern over a "have and have-not" academic experience that honors programs tend to cultivate. Harris harbored another concern that some of the new-found (post-1960) enthusiasm over honors colleges and programs were driven more by consumerism, albeit a type of consumerism that was antithetical to altruistic efforts towards elevating learning experiences and academic excellence.

=== Honors colleges vs. honors programs ===
Admission to honors colleges and programs is selective. Honors colleges often have smaller classes. The difference between an honors college and honors program varies, but has little to do with the level of resources allocated by a university. For example, some public universities, namely large universities, offer multiple well-funded honors programs for specific academic disciplines, including arts and sciences or liberal arts (with a broad sub-list of possible disciplines, including mathematics), business, natural sciences, health sciences, engineering, and computer science. Aside from that, honors programs, compared to honors colleges, are sometimes smaller and less formal, but might not offer additional resources – such as exclusive residences and academic buildings.

In some institutions, honors programs are built around unique degree programs unto themselves. Most honors colleges, academically, offer no degrees, but administratively are structured as autonomous collegiate units on equal footing with the other collegiate units of their respective institutions.

The decision to structure an honors program as a college may relate to how an institution itself is structured. A collegiate university, one that is composed of several constituent colleges might, administratively, favor an honors college over an honors program. Alternatively, university departments, constituent institutes, and constituent colleges might prefer honors programs specific to their respective missions. If a university is institute centric, an honors program might be structured as an honors institute.

=== Selected commentary ===
Frank Bruni – a journalist with the New York Times and author of the 2015 book Where You Go Is Not Who You'll Be, An Antidote To The College Admission Mania – has expressed general acclaim for honors colleges and programs and cites some advantages. In his 2015 column "A Prudent College Path", he cited the value of public university honors colleges and programs and recommended books by John Willingham, who evaluated honors colleges for many years.

== Ratings ==
Peterson's Smart Choices: Honors Programs & Colleges published its fourth edition in 2005. (Note: Peterson's Honors Programs: the Only Guide to Honors Programs at More Than 350 Colleges and Universities Across the Country, compiled by Joan Digby, PhD (née Joan Hildreth Weiss; born 1942), Peterson's for the National Collegiate Honors Council (1997); OCLC 37327349 Note: Dr. Digby, a nationally recognized expert on Honors Programs, has, since 1977, been head of the Honors Program at LIU Post.) (Note: Peterson's Honors Programs: the Official Guide of the National Collegiate Honors Council (2nd ed.), compiled by Joan Digby, PhD (née Joan Hildreth Weiss; born 1942), Peterson's for the National Collegiate Honors Council (1999); OCLC 42925412) (Note: Honors Programs & Colleges (3rd ed.), compiled by Joan Digby, PhD (née Joan Hildreth Weiss; born 1942), Peterson's for the National Collegiate Honors Council (2002); OCLC 50079543) Several liberal arts oriented institutions, including Reed College, have strongly rejected the validity of ratings, namely those of US News & World Report, arguing that, among other things, the ratings lead to data-driven educational policies that, in turn, cause institutions to alter programs at the expense of quality – simply to look more appealing. They have asserted that, with respect to liberal arts programs in particular, ratings are insufficient and can be misleading.

== See also ==
- List of honors programs and colleges in the United States
- National Collegiate Honors Council
