= D-Con =

Anime convention in Dundee, Scotland

- Status: Defunct
- Genre: Multi-genre
- Venue: Dundee University Students Association
- Location: Dundee
- Country: United Kingdom
- Inaugurated: 2009
- Attendance: Over 2,500 in last event (2011)

D-Con (standing for Dundee Convention) was an anime convention held in Dundee, Scotland. It was the UK's highest attended free anime convention. D-Con was an annual event run around the end of February/beginning of March, and showcased events for fans of anime, art and video game culture.

== History ==
Poster by Yibao Gao outside of D-CON 2010

D-CON was founded by Kieran Baxter, Sarah Dargie, Yibao Gao and Jamie Keddie in late 2008. It first ran on 28 February 2009 and attracted 350 guests. This made it the highest attended anime convention in Scotland, followed closely in numbers by another Scottish convention, Auchinawa.

The second D-CON was held on 6–7 March 2010, where over 2000 guests attended the convention in the course of the weekend. Video-gaming companies, Gamestation and Realtime Worlds, sent representatives to the event to give talks. An early showing of Final Fantasy XIII was also given in the gaming room.

D-CON 2011 saw a higher attendance again. A preview of the Nintendo 3DS was given as well as Kendo demonstrations along with many other events similar to the previous 2010 event.

A gap year was taken in 2012 with the president, Jamie Keddie, and co-founders agreeing to return in 2013.

== Programming ==
The D-CON's list of events includes:

- Artists Alley
- Gaming Room
- Live Chiptune Music
- Letraset Drawing Area
- MVM Films Cinema Room
- Guitar Hero Free Play
- Dance Dance Revolution Free Play
- Yu-Gi-Oh! Trading Card Game tournament
- Wii tournaments
- PlayStation tournaments
- Xbox 360 tournaments
- Handmade Cosplay Contest
- Kendo Demonstrations
- 501st Legion UK Garrison photoshoot
- Digital Art Tutorials
- Deano, Dazza and Cams Pub

== See also ==
- AUKcon
