= Laura Watton =

British comics artist

Laura Watton-Davies
- Born: Laura Watton; 2 August 1979 (age 47) England
- Area: Illustrator
- Pseudonym: PinkAppleJam

Laura Watton (born 2 August 1979) is a semi-professional UK manga artist and founding member of Sweatdrop Studios. Watton was a member since its inception until 2010, announcing the decision to create works under 'Pinkapplejam.com'. She self-publishes her series Biomecha. Currently residing in Cambridge, Cambridgeshire, England Laura creates freelance illustrations.

== Biography ==
Watton has been part of the anime scene since the early 1990s, entering artwork and letters to such magazines as Super Play and Anime FX, the fanzine Red Leopard and provided the covers for Anime Connect 1–3. In 2001 she joined up with other comic creators Hayden Scott-Baron/Dock, Sam Brown/Subi and Foxy in founding one of the largest UK Manga art collectives, Sweatdrop Studios.

Laura has produced a number of comics including Pinkaa Fairy, which features in the Sweatdrop anthology 'Sugardrops' (2004), 'Different for girls' which featured in the anthology 'Stardust' (2006) and Steaming, co-written by Aleister Kelman, which featured in the anthology 'Blue is for Boys'. In 2006, Laura was one of the winners of the Neo magazine manga competition, with her short comic Sea Bream Dream. She has also published a graphic novel volume of Biomecha (ISBN 978-1-905038-12-1), her manga style comic which was shortlisted for the 2007 Eagle Awards. She also achieved a runner-up position in the 3rd Rising Stars of Manga United Kingdom and Ireland competition. Watton was also one of the head contributors to 'Draw Manga Sweatdrop Studios' for New Holland Publishers (UK) Ltd.

== Bibliography ==
- Sugardrops (multiple artists; ISBN 1-905038-00-3)
- Stardust (multiple artists; ISBN 1-905038-06-2)
- Blue is for Boys (multiple artists; ISBN 978-1-905038-08-4)
- Cold Sweat & Tears (multiple artists, ISBN 978-1-905038-02-2)
- Biomecha Book 1 (ISBN 978-1-905038-12-1)
- Digital Manga Techniques (Hayden Scott-Baron, ISBN 0-7136-7475-X)
- Draw Manga - Sweatdrop Studios (multiple artists; ISBN 1-84537-416-9)
- Drawing Manga (Selina Dean, ISBN 0-00-723178-4)
- Manga Clip Art (multiple artists; ISBN 1-904705-83-9)
- The Cartoonists' Bible (multiple artists; ISBN 1-84448-188-3)
- 500 Manga Characters (Sweatdrop Studios; ISBN 0-06-125652-8)
- Rising Stars of Manga UK & EIRE #3 (multiple artists; ISBN 1-4278-1165-2)
- Mammoth Book of Zombie Comics (multiple artists; ISBN 978-1-84529-714-5)
- Drop Dead Monstrous (multiple artists; ISBN 978-1-905038-17-6)
