= AUKcon =

1994 anime convention in London, England

- Status: Defunct
- Venue: Conway Hall
- Location: London
- Country: England
- Inaugurated: 1994

AUKcon was a one-day anime convention held in London, England, on 19 February 1994. The venue was the Conway Hall (Red Lion Square), and the registration charge was £10. AUKCon was chaired by Helen McCarthy. During the convention, Lawrence Guinness of Manga Video announced that the company had acquired distribution rights for Ranma ½ and planned to start releasing it in 1994. Also announced included plans for the series Bio Booster Armor Guyver. One of the guests that attended was Toren Smith, writer of the American Dirty Pair comic and founder of Studio Proteus. The convention was the first UK anime event to provide a fan room with free space for fanzines and fanclubs. It also ran a gaming programme and an art and model show, as well as anime screenings and talks.

== See also ==
- D-Con
- Hyper Japan
- Tomo-Dachi
