= GoodKnyght! =

2001 novel by Steve Barlow and Steve Skidmore

- First edition
- Author: Steve Barlow; Steve Skidmore
- Cover artist: Andy Parker
- Language: English
- Series: Tales of the Dark Forest
- Genre: Fantasy novel
- Publisher: HarperCollins
- Publication date: 2001
- Publication place: United Kingdom
- Pages: 281
- ISBN: 0-00-710863-X
- Followed by: Whizzard!

GoodKnyght! is a 2001 fantasy novel written by Steve Barlow and Steve Skidmore, (known as The Two Steves) as the first part of the Tales of The Dark Forest series. Its sequel, Whizzard! was released in 2002.

== Plot summary ==
Willum is a swineherd and whipping boy for Symon, the son of the city's High Lord. Aspiring to become a knyght, he dreams of attending Knyght School. After participating in a tournament on Symon's behalf, Willum is granted the opportunity to enroll.

During his journey, Willum encounters several characters, including Rose, a girl who lives in the forest; Luigi, an Italian restaurateur; Humfrey the Boggart, a Pryvate Inquestigator with a speech impediment; a sarcastic Harp; and a wizard known as the Runemaster, who possesses the Dragonsbane—a magical stone capable of accessing a dragon’s mind. When the Dragonsbane is stolen, Willum, Rose, and the Harp embark on a quest to recover it from the Ragged Mountain.
