= Outernet (novel series) =

Children's novels by Steve Barlow and Steve Skidmore

Outernet is a humorous series of children's science fiction books written by Steve Barlow and Steve Skidmore.

The series consists of six books: Friend or Foe?, Control, Odyssey, Time Out, The Hunt, and Weaver.

== Plot ==
=== Friend or Foe? ===
On Jack Armstrong's birthday, he received a laptop computer from his parents, British residents working on a US military base. They have been having financial problems so he is grateful for the gift. He explores it with his friend Lothar Gelt (nicknamed Loaf) and their acquaintance Merle Stone, where they discover it is a piece of alien technology. Once turned on, it enables them to communicate with a stray dog around the base named "Bitz", who tells them he is actually code-named Sirius (a pun on the "Dog Star" of the same name). He and Merle's apparent cat (named Googie, code-name Vega), are both members of the "Friends", a group dedicated to resistance of The Tyrant, who leads the FOEs (Forces of Evil). Specifically, they are shape-shifters who have become permanently trapped in these Earth creature forms. They explain how The Tyrant has captured all of the servers in the Galaxy except for the one that Sirius and his companion Janus brought to Earth and disguised as the computer. The Server's "Help" program, which activates whenever its name is said, is sardonic and fails to live up to its name. Jack receives further proof of the truth of these odd revelations when he is teleported (called t-mailed) to meet Janus on another planet (teleportation through "N-Space" enables the characters to travel faster-than-light).

Loaf exploits this and galavants around the Galaxy (it is always capitalised in the series) irresponsibly enough for the FOEs to imprison some of the Earth resistance. Janus rescues them, but a Bug (an extraterrestrial resembling a rhinoceros, in The Tyrant's employ) follows them to Earth when Tracer, The Tyrant's right-hand man, sends a "western" virus into the Server. Merle fends it off with her chess skill and Loaf resists it with an arcade-style simulation, but when Jack is playing Battleship, Bitz leaps onto the keyboard, over-ruling Merle's advice, and hits the wrong button. This allows the Bug to arrive on Earth; however, Janus arrives shortly thereafter. In the battle that ensues, Janus and the Bug both fall into N-Space, presumably dead, Janus sacrificing himself for the Server's safety. A message sent to them on time-delay reveals them they can either remain safe on Earth for Friends agents to find them, or search for the enigmatic Weaver, founder of the Outernet.

=== Control ===
With his personal agenda foremost, Loaf cons Jack into giving him The Server in an attempt to make money, which requires him to take out a loan from aliens. His greed causes the seemingly impregnable Chain protecting Earth from the FOEs to be broken, so the Tyrant sends another of the Bugs to get The Server back. As a result, Jack and his friends are stranded on Deadrock, a dangerous planet, crawling with FOEs, and Loaf runs into several representatives of the nastiest loan sharks in the Galaxy. Loaf owes them money and they'd like a word with him. Back on Earth, the Bug poses as an agent of the US government and gains control of Merle's father, Colonel Stone, commander of a USAF base in England. Jack and Merle find allies- but the Deadrock Freedom Fighters face terrible odds, and all they have on their side are primitive weapons and the cranky Help application. As revolution rages on Deadrock, Jack and his Friends return to Earth in an attempt to rescue Colonel Stone and keep The Server from the FOEs. They eventually destroy the Deadrock Server, which FOEs had set up to monitor all information passed through it electronically (speech was forbidden) and reintroduce the residents to talking. At the end, Janus contacts them from N-space and directs them to the planet Helios to meet Tiresias, the "sightless one who sees all things" (a reference to the Greek myth of Tiresias).

=== Odyssey ===
Following Janus's instructions, Jack, Merle, Loaf, Bitz, and Googie attempt to teleport to Helios. However, they are intercepted and detained on a planet populated by spiders. Each time they attempt to leave, they are returned to their original location and time, with no memory of their original arrival. Eventually the Help program is able to break the vicious circle. This leads them to Googie's home planet, Kippo VI. She is arrested as a traitor, but the humans find themselves able to shapeshift due to parasitic natives of the planet that endow all residents or visitors with the ability. They fight off FOE attacks, helped by Loaf, who is being controlled by a chip that Tracer implanted in him.

Unable to teleport to Helios, they look for affordable spaceship transportation and find it in the form of hippie Zodiac Hobo and his anonymous ship, which complains about its status as such until Merle names it Trigger. They arrive safely and are accosted by the Collectors of Helios, a parody of Earth monks. They are led to the Sightless One, who promises to input the Weaver's coordinates if he is given the Server. He is revealed as Tracer, however. It's not long before the Friends find the true Tiresias, a monstrous life-form bound to a computer that collects knowledge but can do nothing with it. After meeting Janus in N-space (he removes Loaf from Tracer's control), they serve as eyes for Tiresias, letting him see the universe before dying in peace.

==== Odyssey allusions ====
As the title might indicate, the third book of the series contains several allusions to the Odyssey of Homer. When Jack sees one-eyed extraterrestrial guards, he is reminded of Cyclops, and suggests disguising themselves, as Odysseus and his crew disguised themselves by hiding under sheep.

This is successful, and Jack and his friends eventually escape on Trigger. Once in space, they hear a message claiming to be from a woman named Molpe, a refugee from the fictional planet of "Ligeia". After some debate, Jack orders the refugees' rescue, only to find that the humanoids have metamorphosed into dangerous asteroids. After escaping them, Trigger lands on what appears to be an asteroid. One of the characters, however, identifies it as a silla, a creature that traps spaceships. Trigger escapes this threat as well, only to fall into a black hole that parallels the mythological Charybdis.

In the first chapter of the book, the protagonists are involuntarily teleported to a planet occupied by arachnid extraterrestrials (and, indeed, named "Arachnius III"). A "reverse Chain" of teleportation allows them to be repeatedly teleported from the teleportation station where they arrive back to that same station, with no memory of the previous times they've arrived there. The Arachnians analyse the protagonists' saliva to produce food perfectly catered to their tastes: both of these facets allude to the mythological Lotophagi. At the end of the book, they are indeed successful in meeting Tiresias.

=== Time Out ===
Jack, Merle, Loaf and their companions Googie and Bitz travel back in time to Vered II, homeworld of tree-dwelling computer genius Selenity Dreeb, a member of a group of computer fanatics called the Weavers. Merle attempts to return to her own time, but winds up in an alternate universe in which the Outernet was never created: Tracer is invading Earth, and she is a rebel on the opposite side of the war from Jack. Lothar, Loaf's alternative self, tells her that the alternate version of her was killed but that they had had a relationship. She brings him back with her to Selenity's time, where Jack gives Selenity the information needed to start the Outernet. A jealous Loaf leaves the alternate Lothar behind when they try to return to Earth, but in that timeline Janus and Sirius/Bitz were captured by FOEs on Vered. They go to a recent version of Vered and wind up having to create three copies of themselves to allow Janus and Sirius to escape. It is revealed that Help was previously helpful, but months of being carried across the countryside by Bitz corrupted his memory. When they return to Earth, the time-traveling capability is disabled.

=== The Hunt ===
The Tyrant has retired the Bugs for their repeated failures and recruited Bounty Hunters, the ruthless, self-serving scum of the universe. Their task is to hunt down The Server along with Jack and his Friends. Mad Moxie, the Thing With No Name and Tingkat Bumbag (the most feared Hunter in the Galaxy) are bad enough, but when The Tyrant's renegade ex-Communications Chief and Zodiac Hobo, space adventurer extraordinaire (not forgetting Zodiac's ship Trigger) lend a hand (or in Tracer's case, six hands), things get seriously out of hand. What follows is a roller-coaster ride around the Earth as Jack and his companions try to stay one step ahead of the Bounty Hunters and activate the planet's ancient defences against alien invasion. They use a low-tech form of teleportation, travelling to Stonehenge (where Janus and Sirius originally landed), the Great Pyramid of Giza, Machu Picchu, Uluru, and Shangri-La to complete a chain that will defend Earth. The Tyrant, however, takes advantage of their absence to capture Jack's parents.

=== Weaver ===
Jack and his companions have foiled The Tyrant, leader of the FOEs and Most Evil Being in the Galaxy, time after time. However, the Tyrant has kidnapped Jack's parents. And now Merle, Loaf, Googie and Bitz have to help Jack take the fight to the Dread Lord himself, to the depths of the Dark Pyramid. The final struggle to save The Server, and with it the Outernet, the Pan-Galactic Web itself, is about to begin.

Janus gives Help access to a startling secret: the Bugs, believed to be genetically engineered, were in fact a thriving species before The Tyrant annihilated all but one and cloned it. With this knowledge, the Bugs willingly come to Jack's side for the showdown. The Tyrant is revealed to be Lothar, who grew bitter on Vered. The Weaver turns out to be Tracer, who has contained Selenity's consciousness as well through a mind-meld. The Tyrant disappears into N-Space, and Tracer/Selenity/Weaver is physically killed but able to survive consciously through the Outernet. Jack takes on the title of Weaver but Loaf and Merle move to the U. S., promising to keep in touch with Jack through the Outernet.
