= A Chinese Life =

2012 graphic novel by Li Kunwu and Philippe Ôtié

A Chinese Life (French: Une vie chinoise) is a 2012 French graphic novel co-written by Li Kunwu and Philippe Ôtié, and illustrated by Li Kunwu. Edward Gauvin translated the book into English.The book recounts Li Kunwu's life against the background of modern Chinese history, including the Cultural Revolution, the Great Leap Forward and the country's subsequent economic transformation. Kana published the French version, and SelfMadeHero published the English translation.

Li Kunwu (born 1955), an artist, received a proposal to make a graphic novel about his life in 2005. The co-writer, Ôtié, worked for the French Embassy as a commercial counselor/advisor to Yunnan. It was first published in France; the first volume was published in 2009, and the third and final volume was published in 2011. In 2012 the English version was published in one volume.

Clément Benech of Libération described it as somewhat of an equivalent of Vie Française by Jean-Paul Dubois.

== Reception ==
James Smart of The Guardian wrote that "This ambitious graphic novel pulls you to the chest of the world's latest superpower, shows you something of what it has gained and lost, and lets you go, 60 years later, drained and intrigued and feeling as though you know China's great, tangled present a little bit better."

== Awards ==
A Chinese Life received an Excellence Award in the Manga Division at the 18th Japan Media Arts Festival. In 2013, it was nominated for the Eisner Awards in two categories: Best Reality Based Work and Best U.S. Edition of International Material Asia.
