= Dragonsdale =

2007 novel by The Two Steves

- First edition
- Author: The Two Steves writing as Salamanda Drake
- Cover artist: Gilly Marklew
- Series: Dragonriders of Bresal
- Genre: Children's fantasy novel
- Publisher: Scholastic
- Publication date: 2007
- Publication place: United Kingdom
- Media type: Print (hardcover)
- Pages: 288 pp (first edition)
- ISBN: 978-0-439-87173-0 (first)
- OCLC: 76871351
- LC Class: PZ7.D78297 Dra 2007
- Followed by: Riding The Storm

Dragonsdale is a fantasy novel written by The Two Steves (Steve Barlow and Steve Skidmore) under the pen name "Salamanda Drake" and published by Scholastic in 2007.

Three books were written after the first, including the direct sequel, Riding the Storm (2008), as well as the third installment Snowfall and Dragonfire (2018) and the fourth installment Flying for Gold (2018). ISFDB catalogues the four novels as the Dragonriders of Bresal series.

== Plot ==
The novel takes place in a fictional location called the Isles of Bresal which are protected by a bank of mist called The Veil. On Bresal there are stables that train dragons. Cara, the protagonist, cleans dragons for the stable Dragonsdale. Many children attend Dragonsdale to learn to train dragons and take them to competitions, but Cara is forbidden to ride any dragon even though her father is the head of Dragonsdale. This is because her mother had died in an accident during a flight with dragons, and her father, Huw, couldn't afford to lose Cara as well. However, Cara is allowed to help clean the dragons, and she has a favorite one called Skydancer. She ends up having to train a young farm boy called Drane to muck out the stables and do all the things she does. But all is not what it seems about him as Cara and Drane slowly become better friends. Now, many children at Dragonsdale are preparing for the dragon riding competitions. Although Cara cannot participate in it, she supports her friends Breena and Wony.

Cara is still determined to convince her father to let her ride dragons and one day go to the competitions with Skydancer. Dragonsdale follows Cara as she goes through obstacles, such as an arrogant child called Hortense, who is constantly making Cara mad, and finally achieves her goal when she buys Skydancer, but she loses control and declares he must be destroyed.

Cara runs away with Skydancer to the mountains. In the mountains, Cara loses her way and follows a path leading in the wrong direction. The path leads Cara off a cliff and she nearly falls off of it, but Skydancer takes the back of Cara's shirt and pulls her to safety, it is after that that Cara and Sky Hear the Firedogs and Howlers for the first time. When they hear the Firedogs and Howlers for a second time Cara finds out that Drane was following her. When they're being circled in by the Firedogs and Howlers Sky dancer runs out of flame and Drane encourages Cara to ride Skydancer. While Drane is trying to make Cara ride Skydancer Cara is encouraging Drane to ride Sky (Skydancer) and be saved from death as well. But Drane refuses.

While all this is happening, back in Dragonsdale Huw, Cara's father, is worried.

Back in the mountains, Drane finally gets Cara to ride Skydancer, but was picked up in Sky's talons! Together, Sky, Cara and Drane fly back to Dragonsdale after promising that they won't say that Cara rode Sky.

She secretly trains Skydancer to fly through obstacles. Hortense and Huw discover this and Huw bans Cara from riding Skydancer ever again. A competition comes up and Hortense is to ride Skydancer. Skydancer makes mistakes based on Hortenses confusing signals and they lose the competition. When Cara goes to the ring she sees Hortense yelling at Sky, then Hortense punishes him with a whip on the muzzle. Skydancer gets mad and gets ready to flame Hortense. Just on time, Cara stops Skydancer, and they decide to do the obstacle course together. Cara does an excellent job, but she knows her father is mad. Surprisingly, Huw lets Cara ride again and bans Hortense from riding Skydancer ever again. The dragon and dragonrider live happily ever after and fly off into the noon sun, at least until the novel's sequel. That is called Riding the Storm.
