= Hayden Scott-Baron =

English illustrator

Hayden Scott-Baron (born 6 April 1980), known as Dock, is an English professional illustrator and graphic designer. In 2001 he joined up with other comic creators Laura Watton, Sam Brown/Subi and Foxy in founding one of the largest UK Manga Studios, Sweatdrop Studios.

== Information ==
He is also a prominent games developer, and established Starfruit Games in 2010.

Hayden has written several 'how-to' books on the topic of drawing manga, including Digital Manga Techniques and Manga Clip Art.

He currently lives in Cambridge, UK, and regularly attends UK anime conventions, representing Sweatdrop Studios.

Hayden was awarded second-prize in the 'Tokyopop Rising Stars of Manga: UK & Ireland #3' for a comic named 'Two for Joy'.

In December 2009 Dock became the artist for Minecraft, working alongside the sole developer, Markus Persson. He designed some of the first characters in the game, as well as an unused logo. However he soon left in February 2010 due to work-related issues. His art style and character designs were significantly distinct from what Minecraft would eventually use.

In January 2010 he released an iPhone game called Tumbledrop. Tumbledrop was nominated as a finalist for 'Technical Achievement' award at IGF Mobile 2010.

== Published games ==
- Kinectimals (2012), Frontier Developments Ltd.
- Tumbledrop iPhone (2010), Starfruit Games Ltd.
- Tumbledrop (2008), Starfruit Games Ltd.
- LostWinds (2008), Frontier Developments Ltd.
- Thrillville: Off the Rails (2007), LucasArts
- Thrillville (2006), LucasArts
- RollerCoaster Tycoon 3: Soaked! (2005), Atari Europe S.A.S.U.
- RollerCoaster Tycoon 3: Wild! (2005), Atari, Inc.
- RollerCoaster Tycoon 3 (2004), Atari do Brasil Ltda.
- RollerCoaster Tycoon 2: Time Twister (2003), Atari, Inc.

== Published works ==
- Digital Manga Techniques (ISBN 0-7136-7475-X)
- Manga Clip Art (ISBN 1-904705-83-9)
- Making Anime: Create Mesmerising Manga-Style Animation with Pencils, Paint and Pixels (ISBN 0-240-52045-9)
- Sugardrops (multiple artists; ISBN 1-905038-00-3)
- Blue is for Boys (multiple artists; ISBN 978-1-905038-08-4)
- Cold Sweat & Tears (multiple artists, ISBN 978-1-905038-02-2)
- Rising Stars of Manga UK & EIRE #3 (multiple artists; ISBN 1-4278-1165-2)
