= Whizzard! =

2002 book by Steve Barlow and Steve Skidmore

- Author: Steve Barlow; Steve Skidmore
- Cover artist: Andy Parker
- Language: English
- Series: Tales of the Dark Forest
- Genre: Fantasy novel
- Publisher: HarperCollins
- Publication date: 2002
- Publication place: United Kingdom
- Pages: 253
- ISBN: 0-00-710864-8
- Preceded by: GoodKnyght!
- Followed by: Trollogy!

Whizzard! is a 2002 children's fantasy novel written by Steve Barlow and Steve Skidmore, (known as The Two Steves) as the second part of the Tales of the Dark Forest series. It was followed by Trollogy! in 2003.

== Plot summary ==
Tym, a wizard's apprentice from the Dun Indewood suburb of Leafy Bottom, dreams of being a great magician. It is only when he encounters the mysterious Dreamwalker that he learns the secret of travelling at super-speed and becomes a Whizzard! When his newfound skill causes havoc and puts the beautiful Lady Zamarind into a coma, Tym must travel far across the Dark Forest to save her, and discover his true destiny.
