= Nerve Centre (organisation) =

Nerve Centre is a Northern Ireland creative media arts centre. It was established in 1990 in Derry, Northern Ireland.

Since 1999, the Nerve Centre has been based in a purpose-built multimedia arts centre along Derry's walls with a live performance venue, café, rehearsal space, recording facilities, video editing suites and animation studios. The film and animation work of the centre has received a number of international awards, including an Oscar nomination for the short film, Dance, Lexie, Dance in 1998 and a BAFTA nomination for the animated short, The Crumblegiant in 2008.

From the early 1990s, the Nerve Centre has operated on a regional basis organising music programmes, animation and video projects for young people throughout Northern Ireland. In 2003, the Nerve Centre established a satellite centre at Crossnacreevy, East Belfast to offer access to education and training for schools and youth organisations in the greater Belfast area. Studio On Creative Learning Centre is a partnership between the Nerve Centre and the South Eastern Education and Library Board and is one of three Creative Learning Centres now operating in support of creativity in the youth and education sectors. A second centre is operated by the Nerve Centre in Derry, in a dedicated building next door to the Nerve Centre.

The Nerve Centre is a registered charity managed by a board of directors that includes representatives from the education, arts, business and funding sectors.

The Nerve Centre also has an entertainment venue, hosting popular music, film, video, animation and interactive multimedia. The Nerve Centre promotes creative collaboration between artists and tries to provide a cultural outlet for many young people who feel excluded from what is traditionally regarded as the "arts sector". The Nerve Centre has recently hosted gigs by such bands as Fightstar, Scouting for Girls and The Zutons have performed. Snow Patrol played there in their early days. The centre was also host to Irelands first Anime convention in 2005, Tomo-Dachi. The Nerve Centre is the base of auditions for Derry bands when auditioning for the BBC's ATL Rock School. The Instinct Festival is an annual festival which takes place throughout the city. It is a celebration of the arts and is free to all youth. Workshops that test the imagination and expand on peoples' appreciation for the arts are on show for youth under 18.

Cuts to the arts budget announced in Stormont in early 2015 threaten the future of the organisation.

== Notable performers ==
The following is an incomplete list of notable acts which have performed at the Nerve Centre:

- Above & Beyond
- Hemstock & Jennings
- Adam Sheridan
- Agnelli & Nelson
- Randy Katana
- Bryan Kearney
- Amon Amarth
- Ash
- Athlete
- Babyshambles
- Bell X1
- Biffy Clyro
- Boys Noize
- Christy Moore
- Dan le sac vs Scroobius Pip
- Damian McGinty
- Destruction
- Duke Special
- Elliot Minor
- Erol Alkan
- Fightstar
- Funeral for a Friend
- Get Cape. Wear Cape. Fly
- Guillemots
- Hayseed Dixie
- Hot Chip
- Ian Brown
- Lisa Hannigan
- Pete Doherty
- Scouting for Girls
- Sepultura
- Snow Patrol
- Super Furry Animals
- The Answer
- The Japanese Popstars
- The Magic Numbers
- The Proclaimers
- The Rumble Strips
- The Thrills
- The Twang
- The Undertones
- Shebeen
- The Zutons
- Vitalic
- Waylander
- We Are Scientists
