= Emma Vieceli =

British comic book artist and writer

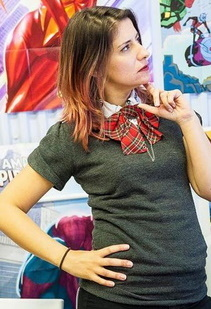
- Vieceli at a convention in 2017
- Born: 13 June 1979 (age 47) Essex, England, United Kingdom
- Areas: Illustrator, Writer

Emma Vieceli is a British comic book artist, writer and musical theatre creator. After being a hobbyist at Sweatdrop Studios, she began freelancing professionally as an artist on SelfMadeHero's Manga Shakespeare: Hamlet adaptation in 2007. Her subsequent artist work includes Young Avengers (Marvel Comics, 2013), Back to the Future (IDW, 2017) and Doctor Who (Titan Comics, 2015). Vieceli started co-writing webcomic BREAKS with Malin Ryden in 2014 and was the writer for the Life Is Strange comic adaptation (Titan Comics, 2018). Bleeding Cool described her as being "embedded into British comic books" and having a "forte" for writing teenage relationships in 2019. Vieceli created the musical theatre show Unfolding, first performed in 2025.

== Career ==
Vieceli joined Sweatdrop Studios as a hobbyist in 2002 and, through the group, released her own comic series 'Dragon Heir' as well as contributing to several anthologies. She described herself as a fan of the diversity and potential of comic storytelling, used her time with the group to encourage new creators, and to help in establishing competitions and events to serve as a platform for nurturing new talent and breaking down barriers between creators. In 2005, Vieceli and Sweatdrop Studios colleague Sonia Leong were approached by the organisers of the MCM London Comic Con, resulting in a showcase of independent and small press comic book creators and mainstream comics called Comic Village.

In 2007, she started freelancing as a comic artist on Self Made Hero's adaptation of Hamlet. She created Violet for The DFC and contributed words to Comic Book Tattoo in 2008. Several years later she stepped down from Sweatdrop to focus on her career. In 2011, Vieceli provided the art for the Vampire Academy graphic novel, based on the novels of the same name.

In 2014, Vieceli and Malin Ryden co-created webcomic BREAKS hosted on Tapas, described as an LGBT story, of which they publishes a new page every week. In 2017, Soaring Penguin Press published its first volume in print as well as making it available to view online. In November 2018, Vieceli was announced as the writer for the Life Is Strange comic adaptation by Titan Comics, set after the "Sacrifice Arcadia Bay" ending of the game and featuring art by Claudia Leonardi.

=== Outside comics ===
Vieceli was a co-presenter of the Anime Network segment on the Propeller TV satellite channel in 2007. She performed in a South Pacific musical at the Cambridge Arts Theatre in 2013 and had a role in a musical adaptation of Little Women in 2019. In the television series Bates Motel, she provided the sketchbook found by Norman Bates in 2013. She provided art for tinyrebel’s Doctor Who Infinity games in 2019.

In 2024 Vieceli won the Stiles+Drewe Best New Song Prize for It Starts Small from her musical Unfolding. The show, with book, music and lyrics by Vieceli, ran for 4 nights at Cambridge's ADC Theatre from 10th September 2025.

== Works ==
=== Interior work ===
- Hamlet (Manga Shakespeare Collection, Self Made Hero, 2007, ISBN 0-9552856-1-5)
- Much Ado About Nothing (Manga Shakespeare Collection, Self Made Hero, ISBN 978-0-9558169-6-3)
- Pink is for Girls (multiple artists, ISBN 978-1-905038-07-7)
- Sugardrops (multiple artists, ISBN 1-905038-00-3)
- Cold Sweat & Tears (multiple artists, ISBN 978-1-905038-02-2)
- Dragon Heir (Volume 1: ISBN 978-1-905038-14-5)
- Draw Manga (multiple artists, New Holland, ISBN 1-84537-416-9)
- Digital Manga Techniques (Hayden Scott-Baron, ISBN 0-7136-7475-X)
- Princess Ai: Rumors From the Other Side (multiple artists, Tokyopop, ISBN 978-1-4278-0822-6)
- Comic Book Tattoo (multiple artists, Image Comics, ISBN 978-1-58240-964-1)
- My Little Pony, Tome 1: Joyeux anniversaire (Jungle, ISBN 978-2-87442-651-3)
- My Little Pony, Tome 2: L'histoire qui fait peur (ISBN 978-2874426-52-0)
- Tokyopop Rising Stars of Manga: UK & Ireland volume 1 (multiple artists; June 2008, ISBN 978-1-59816-464-0)
- 500 Manga Characters by Sweatdrop Studios (Ilex, June 2007, ISBN 978-1-905814-03-9)
- How to Draw Fantasy Females by Chris Patmore (Barron's, March 2006, ISBN 978-0-7641-3089-2)
- Telling Tales (multiple artists, Sweatdrop 2010, ISBN 978-1-905038-28-2)
- Tara Duncan, Tome 1 : La Sirène Muette (Jungle, 2010, ISBN 978-2-87442-817-3)
- Dragon Heir: Reborn (Sweatdrop, 2010, ISBN 978-1-905038-29-9)
- Vampire Academy (Razorbill, 2011, ISBN 978-1-59514-429-4)
- Vampire Academy: Frostbite (Razorbill, 2012, ISBN 978-1-59514-430-0)
- Vampire Academy: Shadow Kiss (Razorbill, 2013, ISBN 978-1-59514-431-7)
- Avalon Chronicles: Once in a Blue moon (Oni Press, ISBN 978-1-9349-6475-0)
- Avalon Chronicles: The Girl and the Unicorn (Oni Press, June 2013,ISBN 978-1934964903
- Alex Rider: Scorpia (Walker Books, Feb 2016, ISBN 978-1406341881)
- Doctor Who: A Matter of Life and Death (Titan Comics, June 2016, ISBN 978-1785852855)
- Jem & the Holograms: Viral (IDW, May 2016, ISBN 978-1631405792)
- Adventures of Supergirl (DC, Sept, 2016, ISBN 978-1401262655)
- Back to the Future: Who is Marty McFly? (IDW, June 2017, ISBN 978-1631408762)
- Breaks Vol. 1 (Soaring Penguin Press, September 2017, ISBN 978-1908030214)
- Olivia Twist: Honor Among Thieves (Dark Horse Comics, April 2019, ISBN 978-1506709482)
- Life Is Strange Collection (Titan Comics, May 2019, ISBN 978-1785866456)
- Modern Frankenstein (Heavy Metal, September 2019, ISBN 9781736817919)
- After the Ink Dries (Simon & Schuster, January 2021, ISBN 978-1-5344-7369-0)

=== Cover work ===
- eV (Cover Artwork, ISBN 978-1-4278-0714-4)
