= Ian Lovett =

English banker (born 1944)

Ian Lovett MBE
- Born: 1944 (age 81–82)
- Occupation: Banker

Ian Nicholas Lovett MBE (born 6 September 1944) is an English banker.

Ian Lovett is a former chairman of Dunbar Bank. He has also held directorships of Barclays Bank, Zurich Financial Services and Openwork (2011–2021) and has made appearances as an after-dinner speaker.

He chaired Middlesex County Cricket Club (2007–2016) and was later Deputy Chairman (2015–2018) and President (2018–2021) of the England and Wales Cricket Board.

He is also a Trustee of the Hornsby Professional Cricketers' Fund charity.
