= Abrams & Chronicle Books =

British book publisher

- Parent company: La Martinière Groupe and McEvoy Group
- Founded: 2004
- Country of origin: United Kingdom
- Headquarters location: London
- Distribution: Hachette UK
- Publication types: Books
- Official website: abramsandchronicle.co.uk

Originally established in 2004 as 'Abrams Books UK', the London office was a subsidiary of the prominent French publisher La Martinière Groupe. Abrams encompassed Abrams Books, Abrams Image, Abrams ComicArts, Stewart, Tabori & Chang, Abrams Books for Young Readers, and Amulet Books.

In June 2010, US publishers Abrams and Chronicle Books teamed up to create a joint marketing and distribution force to serve the UK and European markets.

The UK Abrams sales and marketing team expanded to accommodate the Chronicle lists, and it continues to be based in London. The joint venture is called Abrams & Chronicle Books.

The company continues to provide distribution services to US and International publishers and seek out new complementary lists. Books began shipping from the new company on 1 July 2010 from the UK warehouse at Littlehampton Book Services. In January 2019, the warehouse switched to the new Hachette UK distribution centre in Didcot.

Inez Munsch is the Managing Director of the company.

Abrams & Chronicle Books offers titles on art, photography, architecture, design, sport, gardening, food, and wine. The company also publishes titles on popular culture, its craft list, and its graphic novels. In addition, the Chronicle brand has a range of gifts and stationery by Jill Bliss, Nick McClure, David Chow, and Susie Ghahremani. Recent high-profile publications include The Selby is in Your Place, Art of Avatar, Avedon Fashion, Wisdom, Prada, and Equus.
