= Helena Pielichaty =

Author of children's books

Helena Pielichaty (pronounced Pierre-li-hatty) is the author of children's books.

Pielichaty was born in Stockholm, Sweden, on 11 September 1955, and moved to England aged five. She had a poem, Litter, published in the Yorkshire Post when she was 11. Most of her childhood was spent in Yorkshire and, as a result, she became a supporter of Huddersfield Town F.C.

She was educated at Breton Hall College, and worked as a teacher between 1978 and 2000.

Her first published novel was Vicious Circle, and she has had many books published by Oxford University Press. Her fiction for teenagers deals with topics such as poverty, bullying and depression. She says "I use a lot of humour to carry through some tough subjects, such as mental illness, poverty, and feeling different." Her book series include The After School Club and Girls FC (about women's football).

Pielichaty lives in Nottinghamshire with her husband and two children.

== Bibliography ==
Year of first publication	Title of book	Notes
1998	Vicious Circle	
1999	Simone's Letters	
2000	Getting Rid of Karenna	
2000	Simone's Diary	
2001	Jade's Story	
2001	There's Only One Danny Ogle	
2001	Never Ever	
2002	Simone's Website	
2003	After School Club: Starring Sammie	
2003	After School Club: Starring Brody	
2003	After School Club: Starring Alex	
2003	After School Club: Starring Jolene	
2005	After School Club: Clubbing Together	The first four books in one larger book
2005	After School Club: Sammie's Back	
2005	After School Club: Brody's Back	
2005	After School Club: Alex's Back	
2006	After School Club: Jolene's Back	
2006	Clubbing Again	
2006	Blue Bog Baby	
2006	The Worst Ghost Of All	
2006	Stinky Street	
2007	Clubbing Forever	
2008	Love, Simone XXX	
2008	Saturday Girl	
2008	Accidental Friends	
2008	Football Mad	
2009	Do Goalkeepers Wear Tiaras?	
2009	Can Ponies Take Penalties?	
2009	Are All Brothers Foul?	
2009	Is An Own Goal Bad?	
2009	Who Ate All The Pies?	
2009	What's Ukrainian For Football?	
2010	So What If I Hog The Ball?	
2010	Can't I Just Kick It?	
2011	We're the Dream Team, Right?	
2011	Has Anyone Seen Our Striker?	
2012	Do Shinpads Come In Pink?	
2012	Here We Go	
2012	Here Come The Girls	
