= Peterson's =

American education service company

- Parent company: Triangle Digital Ventures
- Status: Privately Held
- Founded: 1966
- Headquarters location: Denver, CO
- Distribution: Two Rivers Distribution
- Publication types: Books, websites, test preparation, databases
- Nonfiction topics: Higher education, test preparation
- No. of employees: 60
- Official website: www.petersons.com

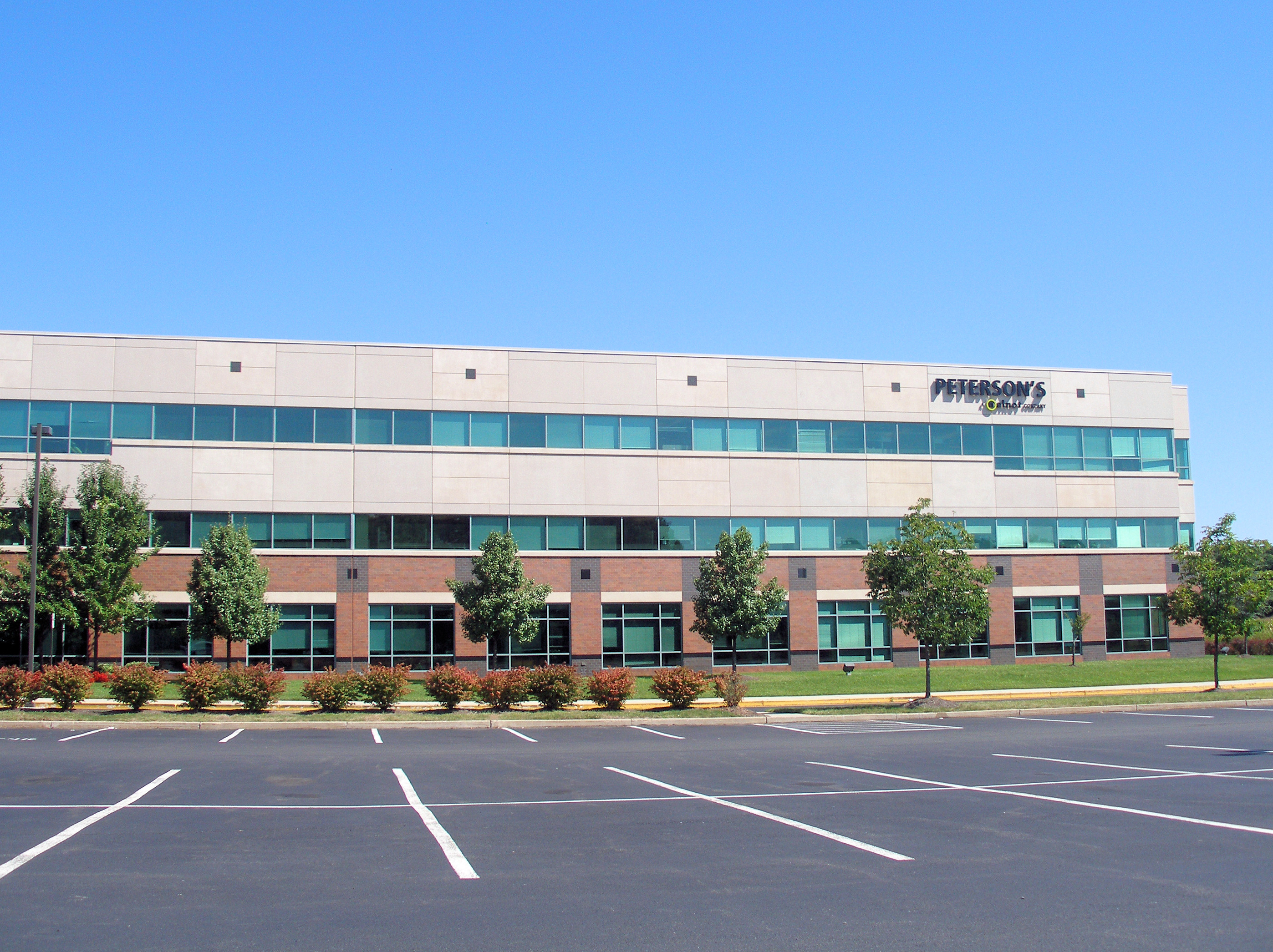
Peterson's former headquarters in Lawrence Township

Peterson's is an American company that has print and digital products and services, including test preparation, memory retention techniques, and financial aid and scholarship searches. Peterson's is currently headquartered in Denver, Colorado. It was formerly headquartered for many years in Lawrence Township, New Jersey.

Peterson's has negotiated contracts with the U.S. Military to offer individualized portals for enlisted Army, Navy, Marine Corps, Coast Guard, and Air Force personnel. Online test prep is available for the ASVAB and various college readiness exams.

== History ==
Peterson's was privately held until its 1995 purchase by The Thomson Corporation. It became part of Thomson Learning (spun off in 2007 as Cengage Learning).

On July 27, 2006, Peterson's was acquired by the Nelnet family of companies.

Peterson's has acquired several companies in the educational space, including the Dean Vaughn Total Retention System in 2015 and the Peterson's Velocity (formerly Mind Streams) in 2016.

On December 31, 2017, Peterson's was acquired by Triangle Digital Ventures.

In 2019, Peterson's acquired B.E.S. Publishing. In 2021, Peterson's Publishing sold B.E.S. Publishing to Illinois-based publisher Sourcebooks, LLC.
