= ImagineFX =

UK magazine

- Cover of issue 242 (September 2024), featuring Hades II
- Editor: Rob Redman
- Categories: Magazines
- Frequency: Monthly
- First issue: January 2006
- Company: Future plc
- Country: United Kingdom
- Based in: Bath, Somerset
- Website: www.imaginefx.com

ImagineFX is a digital art magazine that features workshops and interviews with artists from the science fiction, fantasy, manga, anime, game and comic disciplines.

== History and profile ==
Published in Bath, UK by Future plc since January 2006, the main focus of ImagineFX is the workshops featured in the second half of the magazine, which is published on a monthly basis. Artists such as Ryan Church, Jonny Duddle, Martin Bland and Henning Ludvigsen contribute to the magazine. The magazine come with a DVD but has since switched to digital downloads that include the workshop files that relate to the tutorials in the magazine, program demos, free fonts, textures, images and Photoshop brushes. It also has small segments of traditional and 3D art.

Each month the magazine features an interview with artists such as Alan Lee, Larry Elmore, Frank Frazetta and Jim Burns. Features such as "Rising Star", "Artist Portfolios" and reader galleries showcase the work of up-and-coming artists.

MagazinesDirect has posted on their website: We are sorry to announce that ImagineFX is closing. Issue 273 - on sale 17th November, will be the last issue. All current subscribers will be contacted shortly.

As of the time of this edit https://www.creativebloq.com/imaginefx has not posted the closure.
