= B.E.S. Publishing =

- Parent company: Peterson's (2019-2021)
- Founded: 1939
- Founder: Manuel Barron
- Successor: Sourcebooks
- Country of origin: United States
- Headquarters location: Hauppauge, New York
- Key people: Manuel Barron, CEO
- Publication types: Books
- Official website: www.bes-publisher.com

B.E.S. Publishing was an American publishing company, founded in 1939 as Barron's Educational Services, a publisher of materials to help students prepare for college entrance examinations. In recent years, Barron's expanded into many other publishing fields, with 2,000 titles in a wide range of categories. In 2018, Barron's sold its brand name and its test prep list to Kaplan Test Prep; the company was renamed B.E.S. Publishing. The company was acquired by Peterson's Publishing in 2019. In 2021, Peterson's Publishing sold B.E.S. Publishing to Illinois-based publisher Sourcebooks, LLC.

B.E.S. Publishing's headquarters were in Hauppauge, New York. Several present and past series include:

- Step-by-Step cookbooks, including both ethnic and appliance-based titles
- Made Easy educational books, which cover numerous school subjects, particularly on high school and college level, in concise form
- 1001 Pitfalls, foreign-language grammars focusing on common student pitfalls. The 501 Verbs series functions as companion volumes, and abbreviated pocket-sized grammars, verb tables, and vocabulary books based on these are also available
- Master the Basics, foreign-language self-instruction
- E-Z Series, a series of self-teaching textbooks designed to help students master a variety of subjects.
- Painless, a reference-oriented review of numerous academic subjects
- MazeToons Series, cartoon illustrated books of mazes by Joe Wos. Titles include "A-Maze-Ing Animals", "Myths and Monsters", "Maze-O-Zoic", “A-Maze-Ing America", and “Mega Maze Challenge.”

== See also ==
- The Night at the Museum, published by Barron's
- The Food Lover's Companion
