= National Collegiate Honors Council =

Logo of the National Collegiate Honors Council

The National Collegiate Honors Council (NCHC) is the leading professional association of college and university honors programs and the faculty, staff, and students involved in those programs. The organization is headquartered in Lincoln, Nebraska. It was formed in 1966 in response to the dissolution of an earlier professional association, the Inter-University Committee on the Superior Student (ICSS).

It is a non-profit 501(c)(3) organization.

== Publications ==
NCHC publishes two refereed journals: The Journal of the National College Honors Council (JNCHC) focuses on research about honors education, while Honors in Practice (HIP) focuses on applied research on innovative practices and pedagogical issues. NCHC also publishes a monograph series that distributes informational books.

== Annual conference ==
Each fall, NCHC holds its annual conference in a major city in the United States.
