= The Two Steves =

The Two Steves are British collaborative writers of children's books Steve Barlow (real name Steven Lowe) and Steve Skidmore (born 7 December 1960). They have written more than 70 books together. Their books are published as by Steve Barlow and Steve Skidmore except two Dragonriders of Bresal novels (2007 and 2008) as by Salamanda Drake.

== Background ==
Skidmore wrote the text for at least two non-fiction picture books published in 1990.

The Two Steves began collaborating in 1987 after meeting while working at Fairham Comprehensive School in Nottingham, and have produced a large body of work together. They operate on a freelance basis, and have produced work for several publishers including Scholastic (Outernet series), and Collins (The Dark Forest series). Their first published work was a book of three short plays, "Paper Tigers" (1991) in the Oxford Playscripts series, while their first novel was "I fell in Love with a Leather Jacket" (1993). They have also written a large body of work for educational publishers, and have been series editors for Impact and High Impact (materials for struggling readers) for Heinemann, as well as series editors for Heinemann Plays and Oxford Playscripts. They have also written parody books such as "Star Bores" (2000), to coincide with the releases of popular and anticipated films. However, the bulk of their work still remains in the field of children's and teenage literature. A number of their books have been translated into other languages, and The Mad Myths, Vernon Bright, The Dark Forest and Erik Bloodaxe books have been released as spoken word tapes. They have recently made some of their older books available on the iPhone and iPod touch via Sleepydog.

The 2 Steves are currently working on new books for various publishers, including Usborne and Hachette.

== School visits ==
As former teachers, the Two Steves have toured schools both around Britain, and in other countries including Brazil, China, Qatar, Venezuela, Oman, and Malaysia. They have also been involved with the library services in Britain, and events such as the Northern Children's Book Festivals in 2006 and 2009.

== Selected works ==
=== Early publications ===
Skidmore:

- Poison! Beware!, illustrated by Thompson Yardley (Cassell's, 1990; US: Millbrook Press, 1991), LCCN 91-29898
- What a Load of Rubbish!, illus. Yardley (Cassell's, 1990); US: What a Load of Trash! (Millbrook, 1991), LCCN 91-29894

Barlow and Skidmore:

- Paper Tiger (Oxford, 1991) – "three original, self-contained plays following the adventures of a gang of newspaper boys and girls as they confront such issues as racism, equality and the law." OCLC 24668050
- One (plus one): Monologues and duologues for performance (Hodder & Stoughton, 1991), OCLC 877267409

=== Books for young adults ===
- I Fell in Love With a Leather Jacket (1993)
- In Love With an Urban Gorilla (1995)
- Dream On (1998)

=== Juvenile fiction series ===
Mad Myths

A series of fantasy adventure books focusing on mythological characters transplanted to the modern age, published by Puffin, reissued by Barn Owl, and later available on iPhone and iPod touch. Titles: Stone Me! (1995), Mind the Door! (1996), A Touch of Wind! (1998), Must Fly! (1998), Don't Look Back (2006). The first novel was based on a short play of the same name published in 1993.

Lost Diaries

A series of short books featuring on the supposed diaries of historical or semi-historical characters. Titles: The Lost Diary of Erik Bloodaxe, Viking Warrior (Collins, 1997), The Lost Diary of Henry VIII's Executioner (1997), The Lost Diary of Shakespeare’s Ghostwriter (1999), The Lost Diary of Julius Caesar's Slave (1997), The Lost Diary of Hercules' Personal Trainer (1998), The Lost Diary of Robin Hood's Money Man (1999).

Late in 1999 Collins published The Lost Diary Boxed Set comprising three of these Lost Diaries (Bloodaxe, Shakespeare, Caesar) with The Lost Diary of Tutankhamun's Mummy by Clive Dickinson.

Star Bores

- Star Bores (1999), or Star Bores: May the Farce be With You!: The Original Parody
- Star Bores: the Prequel (2004), or Star Bores: May the Farce be With You!: The Parody Prequel

Episode I: The Panting Menace, Episode II: The Attack of the Clowns, Episode III: The Revenge of the Hith, Episode IV: A New Hype

Vernon Bright

A series of books about a boy genius and his adventures, published by Puffin and later made available on the iPhone and iPod. Titles:Vernon Bright and the Magnetic Banana (2000), Vernon Bright and Frankenstein's Hamster (2000), Vernon Bright and The Faster-Than-Light Show (2001), Vernon Bright and the End of the World (2004).

Tales of the Dark Forest

A fantasy series set in the eponymous Dark Forest. Titles: Goodknyght! (2001), Whizzard! (2002), Trollogy! (2003), Knyghtmare! (2004), "Boggartsh!" (2005).

Outernet

A web/book crossover project about a group of friends defending the universe from the FOES. Titles: Friend or Foe? (2002), Control (2002), Odyssey (2003), Time Out (2003), The Hunt (2003), The Weaver (2003).

Dragonriders of Bresal

A series for girls, written under the pen name "Salamanda Drake", centring on the equestrian-style adventures of a young girl and the dragons raised in her father's stables. Titles: Dragonsdale (2007), Riding the Storm (2008), Snowfall and dragonfire (2018), Flying for gold (2018).

Luke Challenger

Juvenile science fiction series from Usborne Publishing. Titles in the series: Return to the Lost World (2010), Return to 20,000 Leagues Under the Sea (2011), Return to King Solomon's Mines (2012). (Cf. Professor Challenger, the 1912 Doyle classic, the 1870 Verne classic, the 1885 Haggard classic.)

IHorror

A series of Choose Your Own Adventure horror books depicting the life of a fictional character known only as the "Hunter" who protects the world from undead supernatural creatures. Titles in the series: Vampire Hunter, Zombie Hunter, Werewolf Hunter, Demon Hunter.
