= Li Kunwu =

Chinese cartoonist (born 1955)

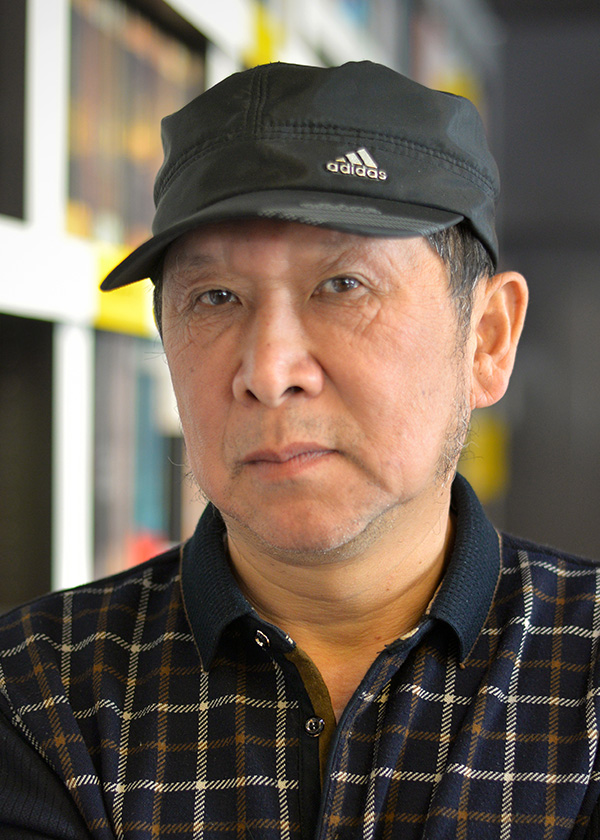
Li Kunwu in 2015

Li Kunwu (born 1955, Chinese: 李昆武; pinyin: Lǐ Kūnwǔ) is a Chinese cartoonist who created graphic novels published in France.

== Life ==
He originated from Kunming, Yunnan, born to a man who fought against the Japanese in the Second Sino-Japanese War and against the Kuomintang in the Chinese Civil War. By the time of Li's birth, he was a secretary in the Chinese Communist Party (CPC). Li's father remained loyal to the CPC even after he was sent away for re-education. Jeffrey Mather of the City University of Hong Kong described Li's father as "the main contributor to the artist's personal development" and "at once a Communist hero and a tyrannical patriarch."

Li is a self-taught artist and never attended art school. He read a book on how to make political propaganda and began painting criticisms of landowners. Li worked as a farmer after, in the 1970s, becoming a member of the People's Liberation Army, and worked towards becoming a member of the CPC. He used his experience in visual arts to make official propaganda for the Communist Party, including images of Mao Zedong. He painted pictures of farmers for the Department of Propaganda and worked for the Yunnan Ribao (云南日报); his comics have also appeared in Chinese magazines including Lianhua Huabao and Humo Dashi. He worked at the latter for thirty years. Li has a son who resided in London.

A Chinese Life received an Excellence Award in the Manga Division at the 18th Japan Media Arts Festival. In January 2015, fourteen of his works were exhibited by the Musée Cernuschi in Paris, and about fifty of his works were exhibited in the Grand Theatre in Angers. In the same year the Michelin Foundation established an exhibit of his works in Clermont, and it did the same the following year in Shanghai.

== Artistic style ==
Ryan Holmberg of Yishu: Journal of Contemporary Chinese Art stated that Li's style was developed from his previous jobs and life, with his work in propaganda, his drawings of landscapes and ethnic people for exhibitions, and his caricatures of people for newspapers giving Li's style "a balance between classical ink painting", a propaganda-style "bombast", "an attention to local detail", and "caricatures". Holmberg stated that Li's style of comics and Taiyō Matsumoto's style of comics are similar.

== Works ==
- A Chinese Life
- ''Ma maman'' (Kana, 2019)

== Sources ==
- Holmberg, Ryan (2013). "Li Kunwu: A Chinese Life" (PDF). Yishu: Journal of Contemporary Chinese Art. pp. 95–105.
- Mather, Jeffrey (City University of Hong Kong) (March 2016). "Propaganda and Memory in Li Kunwu and Philippe Ôtié's A Chinese Life" (PDF). Concentric: Literary and Cultural Studies. pp. 99–118. doi:10.6240/concentric.lit.2016.42.1.05.
