= Neo (magazine) =

British anime magazine

- Cover of the final issue (245), featuring The Demon Girl Next Door
- Editor: Gemma Cox
- Categories: Anime and manga; Japanese popular culture; East Asian cinema
- Frequency: Monthly
- First issue: 25 November 2004
- Final issue Number: 7 November 2024; 245
- Company: Uncooked Media
- Country: United Kingdom
- Website: pocketmags.com/neo-magazine
- ISSN: 1744-9596

Neo (stylised in all caps) was a monthly magazine published in the United Kingdom and Ireland by Uncooked Media. The magazine focused on various aspects of East Asian entertainment, such as Japanese anime and manga, East Asian cinema, cosplay, music, and more.

== History ==
NEO was founded by editor Stu Taylor and designer Claire Trent, and originally had the working title of Sushi-Ya. NEO was influenced by magazines such as Newtype and Pulp, the latter of which featured editorials on film, books, music, and columns on Japanese culture as well as serialised comics. The first issue of NEO went on sale on 25 November 2004. The current logo was adopted on the magazine's 9th issue, which was designed by Terratag. In August 2016, for the magazines 153rd issue, the layout was changed to a larger A4 size. The new staple bound larger format allows posters to be placed in the magazine. In March 2020, the magazine went on hiatus due to the COVID-19 pandemic. It resumed publication in June 2020. The magazine ended on 7 November 2024, with its 245th issue, marking its 20th anniversary.

== Format ==
NEO primarily featured editorials on anime and East Asian cinema, while also featuring interviews with creators, Asian music such as J-pop and K-pop, UK release schedules, reviews, tourism in Japan, OEL manga extracts and an anime and manga cosplay photo gallery.

== NEO Awards ==
NEO ran an annual UK-based industry awards from 2005 to its conclusion. Readers were encouraged to vote for the best in Asian pop culture, from anime, manga, film and music. Eligible titles must have been released in the UK in the past 12 months, and the winners were announced at MCM London Comic Con.

== Staff ==
NEO's staff included editor Gemma Cox and contributions from Jonathan Clements, Emily Lovell, Andrew Osmond, David West, Mark Guthrie, and Tom Smith.

== See also ==
- Anime UK
- List of manga magazines published outside of Japan
- MyM
- Otaku USA
