= Artesia =

Artesia is the historical Latin and Spanish name of Artois in northern France. The name ultimately derived from the Belgic tribe the Atrebates. The county gave its name to Artesian wells, which were drilled there since the 12th century.

Artesia may also refer to:

== Places ==
Botswana

- Artisia

Canada

- Artesia, Alberta

United States

- Artesia, California
- Artesia, Colorado (obsolete name for the town of Dinosaur, Colorado)
- Artesia, Mississippi
- Artesia, New Mexico
- Artesia Wells, Texas
- Artesia Beach, Wisconsin

== Companies ==
- Artesia Digital Media Group, a Digital Asset Management software company owned by Open Text
- Artesia Banking Corporation since March 2001 a sub of Dexia Bank
- Banque Artesia Nederland since October 2006 a sub of GE Commercial Finance
- Artesia (railways), a French-Italian train company
- Radio Television Artesia, a public access television channel in Artesia, California, United States

== Other ==
- Artesia High School located in Artesia, New Mexico
- Artesia High School located in Lakewood, California
- Artesia (comics), a comic book series
  - Artesia: Adventures in the Known World, role-playing game based on Artesia comic book series
- Artesia Som Deikun, better known as Sayla Mass, a fictional character in Mobile Suit Gundam anime series
