= Poison Elves =

Comic book series by Drew Hayes

- Poison Elves #8 cover, the first issue released under the name Poison Elves

Publication information
- Publisher: Mulehide Graphics; Sirius Entertainment; Ape Entertainment
- Schedule: Monthly, bimonthly, varied
- Format: Ongoing
- Genre: Dark fantasy, sword and sorcery
- Publication date: December, 1991 – September, 2004
- No. of issues: 88
- Main characters: Lusiphur; Jace; Parintachin; Hyena; Lirilith

Creative team
- Created by: Drew Hayes
- Written by: Drew Hayes
- Artist: Drew Hayes

Poison Elves is a black-and-white comic book by the late artist/writer Drew Hayes, concerning the life and times of an elf named Lusiphur.

== Origins and influences ==
Drew Hayes' work was influenced by Dungeons & Dragons, Elfquest, and Cerebus. Lusiphur was originally one of Hayes' Dungeons & Dragons characters. The book version of the character was based on Lux Interior of The Cramps, Glenn Danzig of The Misfits, and Nivek Ogre of Skinny Puppy.

== Publication history ==
Hayes originally self-published the series during the early 1990s, under his company Mulehide Graphics, under the title of I, Lusiphur. The title was changed to Poison Elves because the similarity of "Lusiphur" to Lucifer led to the misconception that the series was Satanic in nature. Hayes claimed in one of his "Starting Notes" that the name-change was prompted by a letter from a teenage fan whose mother had thrown out his comics after finding I, Lusiphur comics amongst his collection. Sales were reported to have increased significantly after the name change.

The first ten issues of the Mulehide series were published in a larger magazine-size format.

In 1995, Drew Hayes signed on with Sirius Entertainment, a move that increased his exposure, fan base, and publishing rate. Sirius published Poison Elves through issue #79 (Nov, 2007), collecting them in twelve trade paperbacks through issue #75. Hayes died in 2007, bringing the series to an abrupt end. A commemorative issue #80 was released to give fans a look at sketches and plans Drew Hayes had for the future of the series before his death.

Beginning in March 2014, a continuation of the original series, Drew Hayes Poison Elves, based on Hayes' outline for future issues, was published by Ape Entertainment. Written by Sirius publisher Robb Horan and illustrated by Osvaldo Pestana Montpeller, the story picks up almost precisely at the cliffhanger point at the end of the original issue #79. Only three issues were published before the series abruptly ended, which was possibly connected to Ape Entertainment CEO David Hedgecock leaving the company to join IDW Publishing. An unknown number of completed issues remain unpublished.

On July 20, 2023, Sirius Entertainment launched a successful Kickstarter campaign to fund the completion of the first volume of a series of five volumes to collect the entirety of Poison Elves in print and digital formats. A second successful Kickstarter campaign launched on June 8, 2024 to fund the second volume of the series.

== Background and setting ==
Amrahly'nn, the world of Poison Elves, is one where magic and technology meet. An example of this is Lusiphur's magical semi-automatic handgun that never runs out of bullets. Hayes had described the world as "...a mix of Tolkien's Middle Earth and the Neo-Romantic world seen in the Adam and the Ants video for 'Stand and Deliver'".

=== Characters ===
==== Lusiphur ====
Lusiphur, originally named Luis Amerillis Malaché, was found by a married elven couple in the Carpathian forest in 1380. He grew up in their inn in Port Sarnwog. However, his childhood was an unhappy one after a drunken patron set fire to their establishment leaving his adoptive parents desperate for money. His father sank into depression and was later killed in one of the city's violent class wars. With nowhere left to turn, his mother was forced to enter into the only profession she could, prostitution.

In 1390, things took a turn for the worse when an abusive client battered Luse's mother. She escaped without being beaten to death, but in her hurry, she stepped on a nail. The wound became infected and gangrene soon spread, crippling her and leaving her bedridden indefinitely. Her Elvin immune system prevented her from dying, prolonging her suffering until she begged a young Luse to end her suffering. With no money for a doctor or medicine, the young elf had little choice. He slit her wrists with a razor blade to set her free from the suffering. The image of her death would haunt Luse for the rest of his life.

The orphaned Luse learned to survive on the streets alone where he adopted a new identity which he uses today, Lusiphur Malaché. He spent his younger years working for a crime lord called The Nick, where he was involved in risky heists. During this tumultuous time in his life, he met and fell in love with the beautiful priestess Elf, Lirilith. However, he was unable to leave the gang and the continuing life of crime drove the young lovers apart. (This part of Lusiphur's life is chronicled in the mini series, Lusiphur and Lirilith written by Drew Hayes and illustrated by Jason Shawn Alexander).

==== Supporting characters ====
- Jace san Lanargaith: Lusiphur's companion. A fully trained elven soldier following in his father's footsteps.
- Parintachin: the Imp that lives in and protects Lusiphur's mind.
- Petunia: a sprite, companion to Lusiphur. First appeared in Poison Elves #45.
- Hyena:Lusiphur's sorceress ex-wife
- Lirilith: healer in the Sect of Malamarh'nn and an old friend or Lusiphur
- Cassandra: Lusiphur's third serious love, who kills herself rather than be captured by Jace
- Morachi: head of Sanctuary together with Talon
- Talon: head of Sanctuary together with Morachi
- Vido: head of the blood guard of mandratha, archnemesis of Sanctuary
- Tenth: the second-greatest Sorcerer in Ammrahl'ynn
- Fleece: Lusiphur's friend from Sanctuary
- Cleah: friend to Lusiphur and Jace
- Wisp: psychokinetic boy
- Mogre'Ur: head of the Elvin High council and most powerful sorcerer in Ammrahl'ynn

== Plot ==
The beginning sees Lusiphur left to die in a desert. He makes use of a lamp, with the subsequent genie, that he received after trading the dead body of a Doppleganger to his ex-wife, Hyena. After a failed attempt to ask for a million wishes, he settles on three: A powerful Elven sword named Cinlach, super speed to get out of the desert, and the "well of souls," an assassin tool.

Genie gives him the wishes. But to give them, she has to take them from somewhere. Cinlach comes from an Elven Warduke named Ailwon Sann Fenlach, who quickly notices it missing. He is a veteran of many long-ago wars against the Orcs even if age and time have worn down his fighting acumen. Sann Fenlach has his mage transport him to Lusiphur's location in the desert where he challenges the elf to a duel for stealing his property. At first the Fenlach is winning, due in part to his mage immediately fixing any wounds Lusiphur can inflict.

The turning point comes when a magician named Tenth steps in. Tenth was quietly reading in his study when he felt a temporary shock. The genie drained his power to accommodate Lusiphur's request for super speed. Tenth also pinpoints where Lusiphur is located and sees that he is currently fighting Sann Fenlach. He also sees the disparity in the fight. Lusiphur is a young but experienced assassin, having to fight for everything he ever had. The High Lord is sedentary, fighting his last significant battle hundreds of years ago. In the meantime he has been sitting on his throne recounting past battles. Tenth sees that he is relying too much on the magical connection and severs it.

After Lushiphur defeats the High Lord when the odds are more even, he starts burying the body. Tenth then arrives to take back the small sliver of power that Lusiphur took from him. Tenth wants it to be a fair contest however. Lusiphur could best Tenth in a physical contest and Tenth could destroy Lusiphur quickly if he chose. The wizard has not had a challenge in a while, and so decides to make a sport of it.

In "Tenth's Game," the Elf is given a fighting chance: Make it across 50 meters through an arch. If he does he will survive. His only weapon is a temporary power of shape-changing into animals given to him by Tenth. The wizard promises to only use his shape-changing powers in return.

The two play a cat-and-mouse game, Lusiphur at one point turning into panther-like creature to fend off Tenth who had become a hawk. Tenth turns to a fly, so Lusiphur turns to a rattle snake, but he cannot figure out how to move a rattlesnake. This was when Tenth turns to a Unicorn, causing Lusiphur to panic and he chose a Nightmare (A black batwinged unicorn that bleeds acid and breathes fire.) Tenth becomes a Drake, where as Lusiphur turns to a black Dragon, knocking Tenth into a mountain. After recovering Tenth becomes a gold dragon, the two fight. Lusiphur gets his teeth on Tenth's throat. Up to this point in his existence Tenth has thoroughly beaten any competitor. Lusiphur has made the wizard fear for his life for the first time in many years. The dragon battle drags on, until Lusiphur disappears. Tenth assumes he is dead and scans the ground for his body. As Tenth searches for Lusiphur's body, he tries to go through the gate as a dragon, but he finds he can't fit. So Tenth becomes a Hell hound and goes through the gate, the moment he crosses it, Lusiphur appears out of nowhere and nearly carves Tenth's heart out. Lusiphur had become a flea and let Tenth carry him through the gate.

== Books ==
=== Collections ===
- Volume 1: Requiem for an Elf (published June 1, 1996; contains I, Lusiphur 1–6)
- Volume 2: Traumatic Dogs (published June 1, 1996; contains I, Lusiphur 7, Poison Elves vol. 1, 8–12)
- Volume 3: Desert of the Third Sin (published March 1, 1997; contains Poison Elves vol. 1, 13–18)
- Volume 4: Patrons (published January 1, 1998; contains Poison Elves vol. 1, 19–20)
- The Mulehide Years ISBN 1-57989-044-X (September 26, 2001; contains I, Lusiphur 1–7, Poison Elves vol. 1, 8–20). This volume is a collection of the first four trade paperbacks. "The Mulehide Years" contains full reprints of issues 1 and 2, whereas Volume 1 had only a text recap of those issues.
- Volume 5: Sanctuary ISBN 1-57989-054-7 (published November 1, 1998; contains Poison Elves vol. 2, 1–12)
  - Sanctuary Book 1: Deathmonks
  - Sanctuary Book 2: Vivisection
- Volume 6: Guild War ISBN 1-57989-055-5 (published June 27, 2000; contains Poison Elves vol. 2, 13–25)
  - Sanctuary Book 3: Guild War
  - Sanctuary Book 4: Strange Days
- Volume 7: Salvation ISBN 1-57989-041-5 (published August 13, 2001; contains Poison Elves vol. 2, 26–39)
  - Sanctuary Book 5: The Wolf
  - Sanctuary Book 6: Cat and Mouse
  - Sanctuary Book 7: End
- Volume 8: Rogues ISBN 1-57989-051-2 (published July 26, 2002; contains Poison Elves vol. 2, 40–47)
- Volume 9: Baptism By Fire ISBN 1-57989-058-X (published August 15, 2003; contains Poison Elves vol. 2, 48–59)
- Volume 10: Dark Wars ISBN 1-57989-074-1 (published March 30, 2005; contains Poison Elves vol. 2, 60–68)
  - Dark Wars Volume One: Heaven's Devils
- Volume 11: Alliances ISBN 1-57989-089-X (published September 12, 2007; contains Poison Elves vol. 2, 69–80)
  - Dark Wars Volume Two: Alliances

=== Spin-offs ===
There have been a number of miniseries and ongoing title spin-offs from the core Poison Elves book, and they have generally been written by other creative teams.

(From Sirius Entertainment)

- Poison Elves: Lost Tales, 11-issues series, January 2006 – April 2007. Written and drawn by Aaron Bordner. Self-contained stories about various characters from the Poison Elves universe.
- Poison Elves: Dominion, 6-issues mini-series, September 2005 – September 2006. Written by Keith Davidsen/Art by Scott Lewis. About Lusiphur's adventures prior to the Poison Elves series.
- Poison Elves: Ventures, 4-issues mini-series, May 2005 – April 2006. Written by Keith Davidsen/Art by Aaron Bordner. Each issue dedicated to a different character: Cassandra, Lynn, The Purple Marauder and Jace.
- Poison Elves: Hyena, 4-issues mini-series, October 2004 – February 2005. Written by Keith Davidsen/Art by Scott Lewis.
- Poison Elves Sketchbook, by Drew Hayes & various, January 2003.
- Poison Elves Companion, 1 issue, December 2002. By Drew Hayes, Keith Davidsen, Mark Smylie & the Fillbach Brothers. Lusiphur's allies and enemies, a complete map of Amrahly'nn, continuity guide, suggested reading chronology, new illustrations... Divided into five parts, (The Dark Wars, Lusiphur Malachi, Lusiphur's Allies, Lusiphur's Enemies, and Weapon Guide).
- Poison Elves: Parintachin, 3-issues mini-series, October 2001 – March 2002. Written and drawn by the Fillbach Brothers.
- Poison Elves: Lusiphur & Lirilith, 4-issues mini-series, January–April 2001. Written by Drew Hayes/Art by Jason Shawn Alexander.
- Poison Elves Color Special, 1 issue, December 1998. By Drew Hayes. Includes three full-color stories, focusing on Hyena, Parintachin, and Lusiphur.
- Poison Elves Fan Edition #1, 1 issue, October 1996, Overstreet's Fan + Sirius. By Drew Hayes. "Riders" short story in color + 2-pages Drew Hayes interview.
- The Crow, in Mythography #1, an anthology book also featuring work from other independent creators, Bardic Press, 1996, 64-page. An adaptation of Edgar Allan Poe's "The Raven", telling the story of Lusiphur and Hyena's separation.

== Other media ==
- Poison Elves Volume One Limited Edition Portfolio, by Drew Hayes, set of 8 10x12 inch color prints.
- Drew Hayes Poison Elves Pencil Sketch Portfolio, by Drew Hayes
- The Women of Poison Elves Portfolio, by Drew Hayes, set of 8.5 by 11 inch Color Pin-Up plates of Drew's favorite Poison Elves heroines in the style of his favorite Misfits posters.
- Poison Elves Killer Curves Portfolio, by Scott Lewis
- Poison Elves Poster by Janine Johnston
- Cleah Print, by Drew Hayes
- Lirilith Print, by Jason Alexander
- Hyena Limited Edition Print #2, by Scott Lewis
- Poison Elves Poster Map, by Mark Smylie
- Poison Elves Vinyl Sticker Collection, by Drew Hayes
- Poison Elves trading cards. 1996, released through Comic Images. 24pt., 75-card series with chase cards including 6 Chromium Cards (labelled C1 to C6), a 3-card subset (labelled C1 to C3) and an Autographed card. 8 cards per pack.
- 10 Poison Elves trading cards in the "Creators Alternate Universe" collector card set. 1996, released through Dynamic Entertainment, published by Sirius. 10 cards labelled 35 to 44 in a 90-card series.
- Lusiphur 1:8 scale prepainted statue, designed by Drew Hayes and sculpted by Yoshihiro Saito, cold cast resin, standing 11 inches with base (2000, Sirius/Fewture Models)
- Poison Elves Encyclopedia CD-Rom
- Poison Elves Encyclopedia Limited Edition USB Flash Drive
- Poison Elves Zippo Lighter
