= Artesia: Adventures in the Known World =

Tabletop role-playing game

Artesia: Adventures in the Known World (Artesia: AKW), is a role-playing game based on the comic book Artesia, written and illustrated by Mark Smylie and published by Archaia Studios Press (ASP).

== Description ==
Archaia Studios Press published Artesia (2005) for use with the Fuzion system.

Using a modified and easy-to-use Fuzion-based roleplaying system to plunge players into the strife-riven realms of the Known World, it includes scenarios from the warring Citadels of the Daradjan Highlands to the never-ending feud between the Sun Court of Illia and the Phoenix Court of the Empire of Thessid-Gola.

The original Artesia: Adventures in The Known World rulebook is a 352-page, full-color hardcover book containing all the rules and background material needed to begin play. The book is profusely illustrated by images from the comic book series and by images and maps specially prepared by the author for the game.

== Reception ==
Artesia won the Origins award for Role-Playing Game of the Year in 2005.
