= Akiko (comic book) =

American comic book series

- Cover of volume 2

Publication information
- Publisher: Sirius comics
- Schedule: monthly
- Format: Ongoing series
- Publication date: Dec 1995 - Feb 2004
- No. of issues: 52
- Main character(s): Akiko, Gax, Poog, Mr. Beeba, Spuckler

Creative team
- Created by: Mark Crilley
- Written by: Mark Crilley
- Artist: Mark Crilley

Akiko is an American comic book series written and drawn by Mark Crilley and published by Sirius Entertainment. The comics have spawned a series of children's novels from Random House.

The story has been described as a cross between The Wizard of Oz and Star Wars, centering on the adventures of Akiko, a Japanese American girl, on and around the planet Smoo accompanied by extraterrestrials Mr. Beeba, Spuckler, Gax, and Poog.

Akiko was created while Crilley was teaching English in Japan in December 1992. It was inspired by Japanese anime and manga and classic American comics such as Little Nemo and Calvin and Hobbes. Upon publication in the US it did not become mainstream, but gained an audience nonetheless. Crilley describes his work as safe for children but written for adults.

Akiko has been nominated in the Will Eisner Comic Industry Awards over a dozen times since 1995. In 1998, Mark Crilley and Akiko were nominated for Best Serialized Story, Best Continuing Series, Best Title for Younger Readers, and Best Cover Artist.

== Characters in the series ==
=== Protagonist ===
- Akiko: a Japanese-American girl initially reluctant to distinguish herself, but gradually becomes heroic.

=== Supporting characters ===
- Mr. Beeba: a pedantic polymath and librarian who often quarrels with Spuckler.
- Spuckler Boach: a self-appointed adventurer and part-time mechanic, who often quarrels with Mr. Beeba.
- Gax: a ramshackle robot belonging to Spuckler, equipped with artificial intelligence and a variety of tools.
- Poog: an airborne, bodiless head, capable of psychokinesis and occasional telepathy.

== Production ==
Akiko on the Planet Smoo, the first comic in the series, was published in December 1995. Since then, 52 issues of the comic have been published. The story in which Akiko rescues a captive prince (in the first eighteen issues) was originally a reversal of the traditional fairy tale's gender roles, but Crilley said that, later, "...the whole Prince-rescuing plot became little more than a pretext for a long and obstacle-packed journey. I wanted Akiko to start out as quite weak, but have her acquire strength over time."

When Crilley originally shopped his comic around, Sirius Entertainment believed it could work as an adult series, despite its child-safe tone. Crilley later expressed some surprise at Akiko's relative success. "The people in the comics world expect grittiness, a certain amount of violence, certainly a lot of bang for their buck, and it's kind of a surprise that it has been so warmly embraced by the critical establishment," he stated. Despite much of the comic having been partially inspired by children's stories such as The Wizard of Oz, he believes that the dialogue strikes a chord in both adults and children, as with the comic strip Calvin and Hobbes.

At the suggestion of his fans, Crilley created a series of issues that takes place on Earth. He had Akiko's friends from Smoo crash land in rural Japan, and he thus hoped to possibly enlighten some readers about Japanese culture.

The last issue of Akiko was published in February 2004. On Mark Crilley's blog, he stated that the comic had gone out of production. He continued to write novels in the Akiko book series, with the tenth and final novel released in 2008. In 2004–2005, he created a new book series about extraterrestrials, Billy Clikk; and in 2007 he created the four-issue manga series, Miki Falls.

== Children's book series ==
The first four books borrow their storylines from the comics (detailing Akiko and her team's quest to rescue Prince Froptoppit from the sorceress Alia Rellapor), while the others introduce original plot lines. In Akiko: The Training Master, Akiko is somewhat older and drawn to resemble a teenager rather than a child. Some reviewers referred to the books as a fun adventures appropriate for younger readers, with some describing them as being free of gender and racial bias.

=== Plot ===
The first book, Akiko on the Planet Smoo, begins when a 10-year-old named Akiko is removed from Earth and brought to Planet Smoo because its King Froptoppitt believes she can save his son. There, Akiko is introduced to her fellow questers (Mr. Beeba, Poog, Spuckler Boach, and Gax). The next three books depict a series of adventures, arguments, mishaps, and exotic alien places, creatures, characters, and food, until they reach Alia Rellapor's castle. The next three books contain further adventures (Akiko and the Alpha Centauri 5000 centered on Spuckler while Akiko and the Journey to Toog focuses on Poog's backstory) but Akiko always begins and ends the novel on Earth. In Akiko: The Training Master, set some years later, Akiko and her friends attend a special academy to become official guardians of the Planet Smoo.

== Publications ==
=== Comics ===
- Akiko on the Planet Smoo (one-shot)
- The Menace of Alia Rellapor (issues 1-18) (Collected in Vols. 1-3)
- The Story Tree (issues 19-25) (Collected in Vol. 4)
- Bornstone's Elixir (issues 26-31) (Collected in Vol. 5)
- Stranded in Komura (issues 32-34) (Collected in Vol. 6)
- Moonshopping (issues 35-38) (Collected in Vol. 6)
- The Battle of Boach's Keep (issues 40-47) (Collected in Vol. 7)
- Flights of Fancy (a collection of backup and experimental stories from issues 1-46 - includes all of issue 39)
- Flights of Fancy - The High Flying Expanded Edition (all of the original Flights of Fancy, plus backup from issue 47, all of issues 48, 49, 51, 52, part of issue 50, and an original four-page story with the teenage Akiko from the later novels)

Other items:

- A color short story about a comic book convention in Wizard Magazine issue 86

=== Children's books ===
- Akiko on the Planet Smoo (2000)
- Akiko in the Sprubly Islands (2000)
- Akiko and the Great Wall of Trudd (2001)
- Akiko in the Castle of Alia Rellapor (2001) (ends adaptations from comic)
- Akiko and the Intergalactic Zoo (2002) (original stories begin)
- Akiko and the Alpha Centauri 5000 (2003)
- Akiko and the Journey to Toog (2003)
- Akiko: The Training Master (2005)
- Akiko: Pieces of Gax (2006)
- Akiko and the Missing Misp (2008)

== References and external links ==
- Comic Book Awards Almanac
- Mark Crilley's official site
- An Interview With Mark Crilley at Westfieldcomics.com
