= WWE 2K17 =

2016 wrestling video game

- Cover art featuring Brock Lesnar
- Developer: Yuke's (Note: Additional work by Visual Concepts)
- Publisher: 2K
- Series: WWE 2K
- Platforms: PlayStation 3; PlayStation 4; Xbox 360; Xbox One; Microsoft Windows
- Release: PlayStation 3, PlayStation 4, Xbox 360, Xbox One; WW: October 11, 2016; JP: March 9, 2017; Microsoft Windows; WW: February 7, 2017; JP: March 9, 2017
- Genre: Sports
- Modes: Single-player, multiplayer

WWE 2K17 is a professional wrestling video game developed by Yuke's and published by 2K for PlayStation 3, PlayStation 4, Xbox 360, Xbox One, and Microsoft Windows. It is the eighteenth game in the WWE game series (fourth under the WWE 2K banner), serving as the following from their previous game WWE 2K16 (released in 2015), and followed by WWE 2K18 (released in 2017). This is the fourth and final installment to be released for the PlayStation 3 and Xbox 360 platforms and on those platforms it still follows the gameplay blueprint of WWE 2K14.

== Marketing ==
On May 31, 2016, WWE 2K17 was officially announced by WWE and 2K, when they revealed Goldberg as the pre-order bonus character accompanied by the debut trailer featuring Goldberg. 2K also announced that the game would include the two versions of Goldberg (WCW and WWE), along with two playable arenas (Halloween Havoc and WCW Monday Nitro). On June 27, 2016, a reveal trailer was released announcing that Brock Lesnar would be the cover star for WWE 2K17. On July 14, 2016, WWE announced an NXT Collector's Edition. The set includes NXT wrestlers such as Apollo Crews, Nia Jax and Shinsuke Nakamura as playable characters as part of the NXT Enhancement Pack, a lithograph designed by Rob Schamberger and signed by Shinsuke Nakamura, an 8-inch collectable action figure of "The Demon" Finn Bálor, trading cards, actual ring canvas from the NXT TakeOver: London event, 50% more points in NXT for MyCareer Mode, as well as the Goldberg Pre-Order Pack. On August 8, 2016, 2K revealed the official soundtrack for WWE 2K17, which features thirteen songs from a variety of genres, curated by Sean Combs.

=== Roster ===
On June 15, 2016, WWE announced that at E3 2016, the first roster reveal would be announced at 2K's booth by portrait artist Rob Schamberger. At the event, John Cena, Ultimate Warrior, and Sasha Banks were the first three names revealed. On July 26, 2016, IGN announced that the McMahon family will be playable characters, which will include Stephanie McMahon, Shane McMahon, and Vince McMahon. On August 2, 2016, IGN announced the roster would be revealed every Tuesday for 5 weeks, along with in-game videos and screenshots, concluding on August 30. On August 10, the WWE 2K official site released a minigame that consisted of spotting the announced superstars of the WWE 2K17 game on a picture of Brock Lesnar's Suplex City. The game revealed a roster of 136 superstars consisting of current superstars, legends, and NXT superstars. 2K later revealed that there would be more than 11 extra DLC playable superstars. WWE 2K17 marks the video game debut of 26 superstars.

== Game modes ==
There are a variety of different game modes in WWE 2K17. Unlike previous entries in the 2K series, WWE 2K17 initially didn't feature a single-player story mode in the base game (The Hall of Fame showcase was later added as DLC, featuring the WWE Hall of Fame Class of 2016 entrants in order, from Sting VS. Ric Flair for the NWA World Heavyweight Championship (WCW belt) at WCW Clash of the Champions to a dream match between The Godfather and Papa Shango at the Wrestlemania 32 arena.

=== Play mode ===
Play mode allows the player to jump into a quick match with their own custom settings like match types, participants, etc.

=== MyCareer mode ===
MyCareer mode allows the player to create their own superstar to compete for championships on the main roster and/or in NXT. MyCareer mode is exclusive to PlayStation 4, PC and Xbox One.

The mode also incorporated the new Promo Engine, so Superstars can express themselves to the WWE Universe and also call out or respond to other WWE Superstars. Superstars can now attend backstage interviews with Renee Young with backstage brawling gameplay. Now how a player competes, reacts, what is said, and what attire is worn can make a difference in a Superstar's journey through the WWE. At some point, players are also likely to come face-to-face with Brock Lesnar and his advocate, Paul Heyman.

=== Universe mode ===
WWE Universe mode allows the player to create their own WWE shows and pay-per-view events, allowing them to create rivalries, promos (a new feature) and feuds for singles wrestlers and/or tag team wrestlers and will let them create custom arenas and championship titles.

=== Creation Suite ===
The creation suite allows players to make their own characters, arenas, titles, and more that can be uploaded for other players to download.

=== Online ===
Players can have a variety of different matches with other players online.

== Reception ==
Reception

Aggregate score
Aggregator	Score
Metacritic	(PC) 61/100 (PS4) 69/100 (XONE) 68/100

Review scores
Publication	Score
Electronic Gaming Monthly	6/10
Game Informer	5.75/10
GameSpot	6/10
GamesRadar+	4/5
IGN	8.2/10
PC Gamer (US)	45/100

WWE 2K17 received "mixed or average" reviews, according to review aggregator Metacritic.

GameSpot criticized the game for the lack of a 2K Showcase mode, which was left out in favor of improving the "MyCareer" mode, which itself was criticized for a lack of much improvement.

IGN gave the game an 8.2 out of 10, writing, "The loss of the 2K Showcase is unfortunate, but WWE 2K17s gameplay tweaks and already strong feature-set save the day."

PC Gamer gave the Windows version a 45 out of 100, complimenting the gameplay but criticizing performance and presentation.

== See also ==
- List of licensed wrestling video games
- List of fighting games
- List of video games in the WWE 2K Games series
- WWE 2K
