= Banzai Girl =

Comic book series by Jinky Coronado

Publication information
- Publisher: Sirius Entertainment; Arcana Studio
- Format: Limited series
- Publication date: 2002–2003; 2007–2008

Creative team
- Written by: Jinky Coronado
- Artist: Wilson Tortosa

Banzai Girl is a full-color comic book series created, written and drawn by Jinky Coronado. The series was originally published by Sirius Entertainment with the first volume's full-color trade released by Sirius Entertainment in 2005. A black-and-white manga expanded version of that material was released by Arcana Studio in 2007. 2007 also saw the release of the second series in full color by Arcana Studio entitled Banzai Girls. The second storyline has also been collected, into a follow-up manga black and white trade released in 2009.

== Volume 1 ==
Banzai Girl, Jinky Coronado, is a girl of three parallel worlds. The problem is she just doesn't know it yet. The first volume tells the story of Jinky Coronado, a sexy Asian schoolgirl whose nightmares of being a Princess and a Futuristic Freedom Fighter foretell of extraordinary adventures that effect and inspire her real life. Jinky has to deal with High School, romance, grades, and friends until her life is turned upside down for the weird. Her teachers, and eventually her whole town of adults, become controlled by invading creatures that are dubbed the Shadow Whisperers. When Jinky and her best friend Katie J. realize that their parents have been acting a little out of the ordinary, they take matters into their own hands to save the world. Banzai Girl uses Filipino urban legends as the source of their conflict, including a sinister Snakeman beneath a shopping mall and the menacing Manananggal, a revolting, horrifying vampire that splits apart at the waist.

== Volume 2 ==
Eight months after the story told in the first volume, Jinky Coronado and Michelle Bebot have become popstars. Their new CD is out and they're touring the world. A creature known as the Kapre has been spotted in the woods and the town has noticed that kids have been disappearing. Katie J. has her own plans to take on the Kapre without the help of Jinky or Michelle. The conclusion introduces us to the new Coronado.
