= Animal Mystic =

Title of a series of comic books series by Greg "Dark One" Williams

- Created by: Greg "Dark One" Williams

Publication information
- Publisher: Cry for Dawn Productions; Sirius Entertainment
- Schedule: Varied
Title(s)
- Animal Mystic #1-4
- Animal Mystic: Water Wars #1-6
- Klor #1-3
- Heavy Metal vol. 26 #4
- Formats: Original material for this series has been published in three limited series and one comics anthology.
- Genre: Fantasy
- Publication date: May 1993 – September 2002
- Number of issues: 13
- Main character(s): Nikki Ranoakke

Creative team
- Writer(s): Greg "Dark One" Williams; Robb Horan (script assist)
- Artist(s): Greg "Dark One" Williams
- Editor(s): Robb Horan

Reprints
- Collected editions
- Animal Mystic: ISBN 1-57989-004-0
- Animal Mystic: Water Wars: ISBN 1-57989-024-5
- Animal Mystic: Klor: ISBN 1-57989-036-9

Animal Mystic is a comic book series by Greg "Dark One" Williams.

== Publication history ==
Animal Mystic debuted in 1993 and ran through 1995, originally published by Cry For Dawn Productions and then by Sirius Entertainment.

=== Other appearances ===
For 1998's Crypt of Dawn #5, Kevin J. Taylor wrote and illustrated a crossover story which featured Safety-Belt Man traveling through several Sirius Entertainment-published titles, including Animal Mystic, wherein he met Klor and Queen Jatarri.

== Synopsis ==
The daughter of a wealthy philanthropist, southern California native Nikki Ranoakke dreamed of becoming a great warrior. Trained since youth in martial arts by the secret order of Glass Mantas, she became a student of ancient civilizations and their ways of combat. Traveling to the Brazilian rainforest, Ranoakke befriends a white tiger that she names Mingus, discovers the secret temple of Thalk, and is initiated as lost amazonian tribe's true champion and leader through the right of trial by combat.

Ranoakke, now known strictly as Queen Jatarri, is destined to enter "The Dark" and confront a mystical artifact called the Hypromid for the safety of reality. Doing so, Jatarri is transported through time and space to the alien moon of Praktill, arriving there with the permanent body modification of pointed ears. On Praktill, Jatarri rescues and eventually befriends Klor, a fierce warrior of great wisdom who is a centorg (horse-headed centaur). From Klor, Jatarri learns of a threat to all life on Praktill: the hordes of carnivorous creatures called Spigmodites, which she vows to help eradicate.

Learning that the wizard Rudapogg knows the secret to defeating the Spigmodite hordes, Jatarri and Klor embark on a quest to find him, the pair joined along the way by a female Kisabian (anthropomorphic tiger) named Ryntha and a Draco (dragon) called Shadu. Upon finding Rudapogg, Jatarri learns that she holds the power to control Spigmodites, which she uses to ultimately force them to devour one another in a feeding frenzy.

After Jatarri defeated the Spigmodites, Klor delivered to her the Hypromid, which transported her and her new friends to the underwater world of Antakia. On Antakia, Jatarri learns of Lord Multa's tyranny and she vows to overthrow him. In her quest to do so, Jatarri learns of her cosmic origins and meets the being who initiated her path as the universe's savior.
