= Brody's Ghost =

2010 graphic novel by Mark Crilley

Book 1

Brody's Ghost is a graphic novel written and illustrated by Mark Crilley and published by Dark Horse Books. Prior to its release, four preview stories appeared in Dark Horse Presents on MySpace from January to April, 2010. Book 1 was released in July 2010, Book 2 in January 2011, Book 3 in May 2012, Book 4 in April 2013, Book 5 in April 2014, and the final volume, Book 6, was released April 2015.

== Premise ==
Brody lives in the slums of a city, in a time period said to be slightly in the future, where he is working a dead end job, and living in a small one room apartment. He meets Talia, the ghost of a girl who contracted leukemia. She explains that Brody has special psychic powers that makes him see ghosts; she then requests him to help her apprehend the penny murderer so she can pass on. The books follow the duo's investigations and Brody's training in martial arts and his psychic powers.

== Characters ==
Brody- A young man who has given up on making any real effort in life, since being dumped by his girlfriend, Nicole. Brody is mostly a mellow guy, but he sometimes has a problem with his temper. One day he meets a ghost named Talia, who wants his help finding and apprehending a serial killer known as the Penny Murderer. Because he can see her, she believes he has untapped psychic powers that will allow him to hear "death echoes" at the scenes of the crimes. So, she introduces him to a ghost named Kagemura, who trains him to unlock his powers. He also gives Brody a weapon called the "kanazuchi" (a sort of Kanabō).

Talia- A girl who contracted leukemia at age 16, and apparently died soon after. For some reason, she has been locked out of heaven until she can identify and apprehend the Penny Murderer, or at least, that's what she tells Brody when she first meets him. But she has kept many secrets. She cannot physically interact with the material world, though she says every ghost has one specific way they can do so. Her thing is breaking glass. Because she can't catch the killer herself, she needs the assistance of someone living. She spent her first five years as a ghost looking for someone who could see her, and Brody was the first ghost-seer she encountered. So, in spite of his initial reluctance to get involved, she refused to take "no" for an answer. After she saved him from a street gang called the L47s, he agreed to let her introduce him to Kagemura.

Kagemura- An ancient samurai ghost, who is a site spectre: a ghost attached to a specific location; in his case, Shinshoji Temple. Kagemura has his own reasons for agreeing to train Brody, and has no interest in Talia's reasons. While he trains Brody to unlock his psychic powers (or "Greater Senses"), five demighosts who work for Kagemura train Brody in various styles of combat.

Nicole- Brody's ex-girlfriend, a waitress at a swanky restaurant called Arturo's.

Gabriel- Brody's only friend, whom he describes as one of the few honest cops.

The penny murderer- The mysterious serial killer who targets young women and kills them via strangulation, their namesake is based on their calling card (crime) of leaving a penny on the victims forehead.

=== Demighosts ===
Kyo- a large, muscular ghost whose combat style is brute strength.

Soku- a ghost with long, pointed limbs, whose combat style is speed.

Chi- the most humanoid of the demighosts, whose combat style is about strategy and intellect.

Ran- a flat-bodied ghost with elongated limbs and no head, whose combat style is chaotic and unpredictable.

Gi- a small ghost with a round body and several short, pointed limbs, whose combat style is deceit.
