= Jill Thompson =

American illustrator and writer (born 1966)

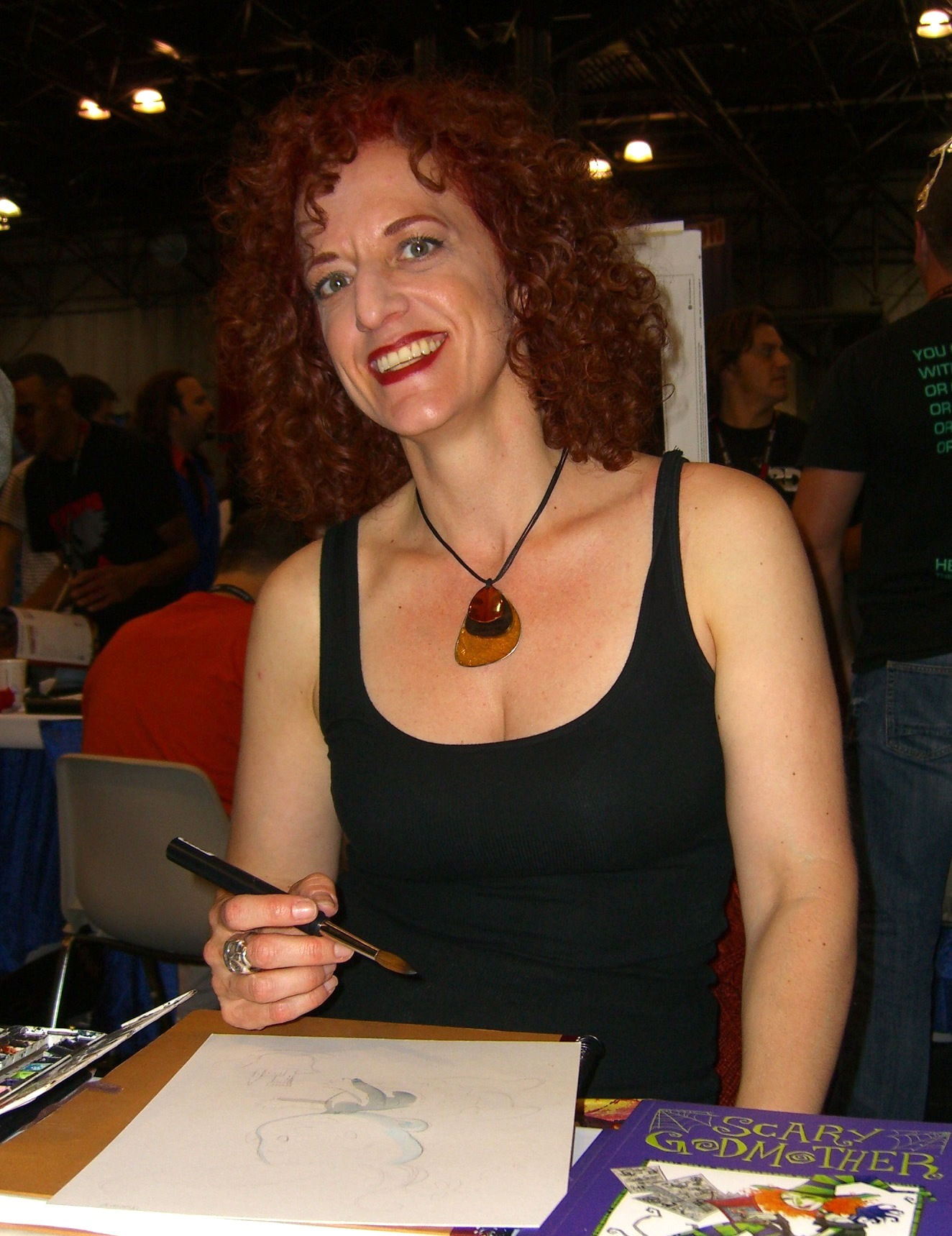
- Thompson at the 2011 New York Comic Con.
- Born: November 20, 1966 (age 60)
- Areas: Artist, writer
- Notable works: The Sandman; Scary Godmother; Beasts of Burden

Jill Thompson (born November 20, 1966) is an American comics artist and writer who has worked for stage, film, and television. Well known for her work on Neil Gaiman's The Sandman characters and her own Scary Godmother series, she has worked on The Invisibles, Swamp Thing, and Wonder Woman as well.

== Early life ==
Thompson attended The American Academy of Art in Chicago, graduating in 1987 with a degree in Illustration and Watercolor.

== Career ==
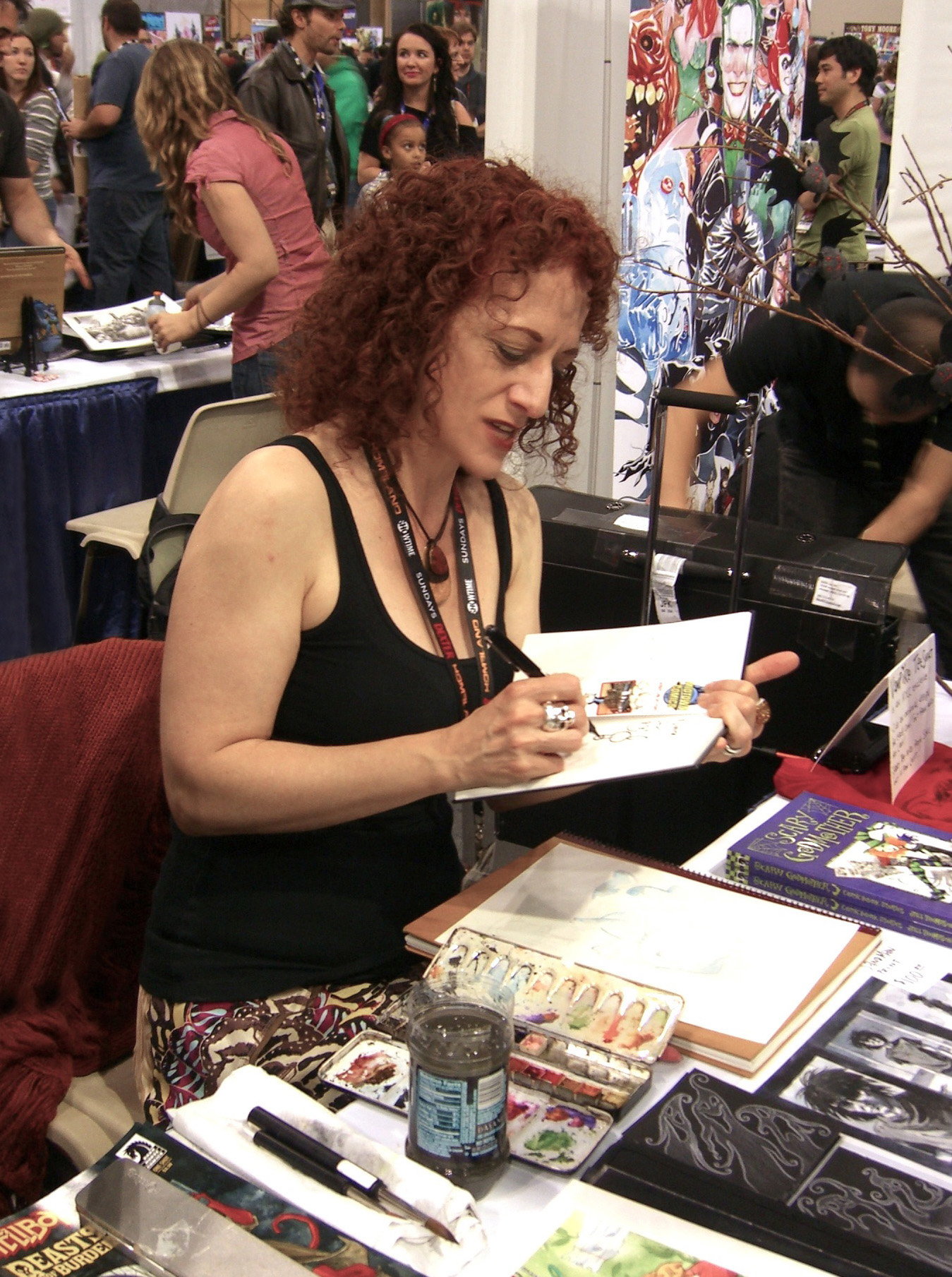
Thompson illustrating in her sketchbook

Jill Thompson began her comics career working for such publishers as First Comics and Now Comics in the 1980s. She became the artist of DC Comics' Wonder Woman series in 1990. Her work on the "Chalk Drawings" story in Wonder Woman #46 (Sept. 1990) drew praise from writer George Pérez who stated "It was a good, quiet story, and I think Jill and I worked really well together on that one." Thompson illustrated the Brief Lives story arc in The Sandman issues #41–49, and the story "The Parliament of Rooks" in issue #40 (part of the Fables and Reflections collection). Within this tale she created the characters Li'l Death and Li'l Morpheus, childlike versions of two of the Endless based on classic comic characters Sugar and Spike.

She has since written and illustrated several stories featuring the Sandman characters. These include the manga-style book Death: At Death's Door, one of DC's best selling books of 2003, set during the events of Season of Mists, and The Little Endless Storybook, a children's book using childlike versions of the Endless. In 2005 Thompson wrote and illustrated The Dead Boy Detectives, an original graphic novel based on two characters introduced in Season of Mists and subsequently portrayed by various creators.

Thompson designed the ring attire for WWE wrestler Daniel Bryan.

Thompson created the comic book series Scary Godmother, originally published by Sirius Entertainment and later by Dark Horse Comics. The books spawned two television specials: Scary Godmother Halloween Spooktacular, which aired in foreign countries in 2003 before being picked up by Cartoon Network in 2004. This was followed by Scary Godmother: The Revenge of Jimmy in 2005. Both were animated using CGI. Thompson did scripting for the project and maintained a measure of creative control. In 2003, the merchandising rights to Scary Godmother reverted to Thompson, allowing her to proceed with plans to create a Scary Godmother fashion doll for which she promoted a successful Kickstarter campaign.

Thompson was a body model for other comics artists, and uses herself as the basis for several characters in her work, most notably as the original model for Scary Godmother. Her likeness has been used by P. Craig Russell in his graphic novel The Magic Flute, and many other works by Russell. In a 2012 interview, she said, "For his Batman: Legends of the Dark Knight story "Hothouse", I was this evil doctor, or someone who was manipulating Poison Ivy...He used me for operas and things, like Brunhilda and Ring of the Nibelung." Alex Ross used her likeness for the character Duela Dent in Kingdom Come.

Thompson is a featured interview in the film Ringers: Lord of the Fans, a documentary about The Lord of the Rings fandom. She was also interviewed for the film She Makes Comics, a documentary about the history of women in the comics industry.

In 2015, Thompson was ranked fourth in the "Top 50 Female Comic Book Artists" poll conducted by Comic Book Resources.

In April 2022, Thompson was among the more than three dozen comics creators who contributed to Operation USA's benefit anthology book, Comics for Ukraine: Sunflower Seeds, a project spearheaded by editor Scott Dunbier, whose profits would be donated to relief efforts for Ukrainian refugees resulting from the February 2022 Russian invasion of Ukraine.

In The Sandman: Act III audiobook adaptation of the graphic novel series, Jill Thompson performed the role of Etain, a character she drew in the comic book series.

== Personal life ==
Thompson studied improvisation comedy at Chicago's The Players Workshop and The Second City Training Center. She performed for four years with the Cleveland Improv Troupe.

Thompson is an avid gardener and holds a Master Gardener Certificate from the Chicago-based Extension program.

Thompson was formerly married to writer Brian Azzarello, but Azzarello mentioned in a 2021 interview that they were no longer together.

== Awards and honors ==
Thompson has won multiple Eisner Awards, including in 2001 for best painter for Scary Godmother, 2004 for "Best Painter/Multimedia Artist (interior art)" for her work on The Dark Horse Book of Hauntings, and in 2005 for "Best Short Story" for Unfamiliar (from The Dark Horse Book of the Dead) with Evan Dorkin. In 2011 the National Cartoonist Society named her Best Comic Book Artist for Beasts of Burden.

She was nominated for Lulu of the Year in 1998 and won in 1999.

National Cartoonists Society Award

- 2011 Best Comic Book Artist Beasts of Burden

Eisner Awards:

- 2000 Best Humor Publication Bart Simpson's Treehouse of Horror (group award) 2000
- 2001 Best Painter/Multimedia Scary Godmother (interior art)
- 2001 Best Title for a Younger Audience Scary Godmother: The Boo Flu
- 2004 Best Painter/Multimedia Artist (interior art) "Stray" The Dark Horse Book of Hauntings
- 2005 Best Short Story, "Unfamiliar" The Dark Horse Book of Witchcraft Evan Dorkin and Jill Thompson 2005
- 2007 Best Painter/Multimedia Artist (interior art) "A Dog and His Boy" The Dark Horse Book of Monsters (etc.)

Eisner Award nominations:

- 1998 Talent Deserving of Wider Recognition
- 1998 Best Graphic Album-New Scary Godmother
- 1998 Best Publication Design Scary Godmother
- 2000 Best Painter/Multimedia Scary Godmother: The Mystery Date
- 2004 Best Anthology The Dark Horse Book Of Hauntings (group award)

== Bibliography ==
=== Comics ===
==== Comico ====
- The Elementals #13, 20, 23–25, 27–29 (1987–1988)
- Fathom #1–3 (1987)

==== First Comics ====
- Classics Illustrated: The Scarlet Letter (artist 1989)
- The Chronicles of Corum (artist 1989)

==== DC Comics ====
- Wonder Woman vol. 2 #45–48, 50–51, 53–55, 57–59, 61–64, Special #1 (1990–1992)
- The Sandman #40–49 (1992–1993)
  - "The Parliament of Rooks" in Fables and Reflections
  - Brief Lives
- Black Orchid vol. 2 #1–6 (1993–1994)
- The Invisibles #5–9, 13–15 (1995)
- Swamp Thing vol. 2 #159 (1995)
- Seekers into the Mystery #11–14 (1996–1997)
- The Dreaming #13–14 (1997)
- The Books of Magic vol. 2 #42 (1997)
- Challengers of the Unknown vol. 3 #10, 13 (1997–1998)
- Finals #1–4 (1999)
- The Invisibles vol. 3 #3–4 (2000)
- Transmetropolitan: Filth of the City #1 (2001)
- Bizarro Comics HC (writer/artist 2001)
- The Little Endless Storybook (writer/artist 2001)
- 9-11: The World's Finest Comic Book Writers & Artists Tell Stories to Remember, Volume Two (2002)
- Looney Tunes #100 (2003)
- Death: At Death's Door (writer/artist 2003)
- Batman: Gotham Knights #44 ("Batman Black and White" backup story) (writer/artist 2003)
- Masks: Too Hot for TV #1 (2004)
- Dead Boy Detectives (writer /artist 2005)
- Fables: 1001 Nights of Snowfall: "Fair Division"
- Fables #59 (2007)
- House of Mystery vol. 2 #2 (2008)
- Delirium's Party: A Little Endless Storybook (writer/artist 2011)
- The Unexpected vol. 2 #1 (2011)
- Shade vol. 2 #8 (2012)
- The Dark Knight III: The Master Race #1 (variant cover art 2016)

==== Marvel Comics ====
- Shadows and Light #2 (Spider-Man) (1998)
- X-Men Unlimited #32 ("Dazzler – Beyond the Music") (2001)
- Girl Comics vol. 2 #2 (2010)

==== Topps Comics ====
- The X-Files: Afterflight

==== Dark Horse Comics ====
- The Badger: Shattered Mirror
- The Dark Horse Book of...:
  - Hauntings: "Stray" (2003)
  - Witchcraft: "The Unfamiliar" (2004)
  - The Dead: "Let Sleeping Dogs Lie" (2005)
  - Monsters: "A Dog and His Boy" (2006)
- Beasts of Burden #1–4 (2009)
- Hellboy/Beasts of Burden (2010)
- Beasts of Burden: Neighborhood Watch (2012)
- Beasts of Burden: Hunters and Gatherers (2014)
- Beasts of Burden: What the Cat Dragged In (2016)

==== Sirius Entertainment ====
- Scary Godmother books (all creator/writer/illustrator):
  - Scary Godmother (1997)
  - The Revenge of Jimmy (1998)
  - The Mystery Date (1999)
  - The Boo Flu (2000)
- Scary Godmother comics:
  - Scary Godmother: My Bloody Valentine (1998)
  - Scary Godmother Holiday Spooktakular (1998)
  - Scary Godmother Activity book (2000)
  - Scary Godmother: Wild About Harry (2000)
  - Scary Godmother: Ghoul’s Out for Summer (2000–2001)

==== Bongo Comics ====
- Bart Simpson's Treehouse of Horror (writer 2000)
- Bart Simpson's Treehouse of Horror (artist 2002)

==== Caliber Comics ====
- The Bandyman (artist 1999)

==== Scholastic ====
- Goosebumps Graphix: Terror Trips – One Day at HorrorLand (as illustrator)

=== Other material ===
==== Harper Collins Children's Books ====
Created by, written and illustrated by Thompson:

- Magic Trixie (2008)
- Magic Trixie Sleeps Over (2008)
- Magic Trixie and the Dragon (2009)
- The Curse of the Royal Ruby: A Rinnah Two Feathers Mystery (as illustrator)
- The Secret of Dead Man's Mine: A Rinnah Two Feathers Mystery (as illustrator)
- Mick Foley's Halloween Hijinx (as illustrator)
- Tales from Wrescal Lane (as illustrator)

==== Stageplay ====
Adaptation/ co-writer, art director, set designer:

- Scary Godmother 2001 at the Athanaeum Theatre in Chicago with Runamuck Productions

==== Film ====
Actor, "Aunt Lindsay":

- Meet Me There 2014 film from Greenless Studios

==== Scary Godmother Animated Specials ====
With Mainframe Entertainment:

- Scary Godmother: Halloween Spooktakular co-writer, editor, art director, background painter, prop designer, executive creative director
- Scary Godmother: The Revenge of Jimmy creative consultation, executive producer, prop and character designer

Preceded by Chris Marrinan	Wonder Woman vol. 2 artist 1990–1992	Succeeded by Paris Cullins
Preceded by John Watkiss	The Sandman artist 1992–1993	Succeeded by P. Craig Russell
