= The Little Endless Storybook =

2001 picture book by Jill Thompson

- The cover of The Little Endless Storybook
- Author: Jill Thompson
- Illustrator: Jill Thompson
- Language: English
- Publisher: DC Comics (Vertigo)
- Publication date: 2001
- Publication place: USA
- Pages: 56
- ISBN: 1-4012-0428-7
- OCLC: 49244405

The Little Endless Storybook is a picture book by Jill Thompson published by the Vertigo imprint of DC Comics. It features the popular Endless characters from Neil Gaiman's The Sandman comic book reimagined as toddlers. A second Little Endless Storybook, titled Delirium's Party, was released in 2011.

== Plot ==
The story involves Barnabas, Destruction's dog on strict orders to watch over Delirium, looking for Delirium after she disappears. He visits each of the Endless in turn to see if they've seen Delirium, but none of them have any clue where she is. At the end, Barnabas finally finds her by collecting all of the sigils of each of the Endless and conjuring her.

== Inspiration and history ==
In the short history included in the 2004 hardcover edition of the book, Jill Thompson states that the idea of depicting the Endless as children came from a passage Neil Gaiman had written for the Sandman story, "Parliament of Rooks", where one character relates a story about when Death and Dream were children. The first characters to be rendered in "diminutive form", Dream and Death, appeared in #40 of The Sandman.
