= Sirius Entertainment =

Defunct American comic book publishing company

- Founded: 1994; 32 years ago
- Founder: Robb Horan & Larry Salamone
- Defunct: c. 2014
- Country of origin: United States
- Headquarters location: Unadilla, New York
- Distribution: Diamond Comic Distributors
- Publication types: Comics, trade paperbacks
- Fiction genres: Indie, underground, horror, fantasy
- Imprints: Dogstar Press
- Official website: www.sirius.choiceoneonline.com

Sirius Entertainment was an American comic book company that operated from 1994 to c. 2014. Sirius Entertainment was founded by Robb Horan and Larry Salamone and was dedicated from the outset to publishing creator-owned properties. Originally based in Stanhope, New Jersey, Sirius later moved to Unadilla, New York.

Sirius was most closely identified with Drew Hayes' Poison Elves; the company also published such popular titles as Joseph Michael Linsner's Dawn, Mark Crilley's Akiko, Jill Thompson's Scary Godmother, and Mark Smylie's epic fantasy Artesia.

== History ==
=== Poison Elves ===
In 1995, Drew Hayes brought Poison Elves to Sirius; and, in 2000, according to Sirius publisher Robb Horan, Hayes "signed a long-term agreement for the property that was specifically intended to allow for an expanding universe and an unhindered continuation of the relationship under any circumstances." With Sirius, Hayes produced another 79 issues of Poison Elves and a color special, the last of which was published in September 2004. In addition, during this period, Sirius published a number of Poison Elves short series and one-shots, most of which were produced by other creative teams.

Hayes died in late 2007, bringing Poison Elves to an abrupt end, as well as the rest of the company's production. The company's last original published work was Hayes' autobiography, Deathreats, in 2009.

=== Post-Drew Hayes' death ===
By 2010, the company's line of back issues was being sold by co-founder Robb Horan via his website CosmicTherapy.com.

In 2013, Horan acknowledged that there were "rumors of the demise of Sirius Entertainment." He made a licensing agreement with Ape Entertainment to continue publishing Poison Elves, with a new title called Drew Hayes Poison Elves, based on Hayes' outline for future issues. As Horan acknowledged:

.... The business plan was disrupted rather severely in 2007 when Drew passed away. Due to his health issues, it had already been almost three years since his last original issue in 2004. With a lack of new material being produced, it was not surprising that we lost our place in [Diamond Comic Distributors] Previews. Nonetheless, we have managed to stay afloat through the worst in anticipation of exactly where we are today; acting as a holding company for Poison Elves.

Written by Horan and illustrated by Osvaldo Pestana Montpeller, the new series picked up almost precisely at the cliffhanger point at the end of the original Poison Elves issue #79. Only three issues were published before the series abruptly ended, a casualty of Ape Entertainment's own troubles.

By 2021 the Sirius Entertainment website, sirius-entertainment.com, had changed hands, and by 2023 no longer worked at all.

== Titles (selected) ==
- Akiko by Mark Crilley (52 issues, Dec. 1995–Feb 2004)
- Animal Mystic by Dark One (4 issues, 1994–1995) — acquired from Cry For Dawn Productions
- Angry Christ Comix by Joseph Michael Linsner (one-shot, 1994)
- Artesia by Mark Smylie (two limited series, 1999–2001) — moved to Archaia Studios Press
- Banzai Girl by Jinky Coronado and Wilson Tortosa (5 issues, 2002–2003) — moved to Arcana Studio
- Chi-Chian by Voltaire (6 issues, 1997–1998)
- Dawn by Joseph Michael Linsner (various series and one-shots, 1995–2000) — acquired from Cry For Dawn Productions; moved to Image Comics
- Deady by Voltaire (2007)
- Deaththreats, The Life and Times of a Comic Book Rock Star by Drew Hayes (posthumously) (2009, 384 pages, ISBN 978-1-579-89092-6)
- Demongate by Bao Lin Hum, Steve Blevins, and Colin Chan (10 issues, 1996–1997)
- Dogwitch by Daniel Schaffer (18 issues, Dec. 2002–Oct. 2005)
- Eleven or One: An Angry Christ Comic by Joseph Michael Linsner (one-shot, 1995)
- Empty Zone by Jason Shawn Alexander (8 issues, 1998–1999)
- Fang by Kevin J. Taylor (two limited series, 1995–1996)
- Halo, an Angel’s Story by Christopher Knowles (4 issues, 1996)
- Model by Day by Kevin J. Taylor (1994)
- Mosaic by Kyle Hotz (6 issues, 1999)
- Oh My Goth! by Voltaire (various short series and one-shots, 1998–2002)
- Poe by Jason Asala (24 issues, October 1997–July 2000) – acquired from Cheese Comics
- Poison Elves:
  - Poison Elves by Drew Hayes (80 issues, [June] 1995–Nov. 2007) — acquired from Drew Hayes' Mulehide Graphics; moved to Ape Entertainment
  - Poison Elves Fan Edition #1 (1 issue, October 1996) — copublished by Overstreet's Fan and Sirius. By Drew Hayes. "Riders" short story in color + 2-page Drew Hayes interview.
  - Poison Elves Color Special, 1 issue, December 1998. By Drew Hayes. Includes three full-color stories, focusing on Hyena, Parintachin, and Lusiphur.
  - Poison Elves: Lusiphur & Lirilith, 4-issues mini-series, January–April 2001. Written by Drew Hayes/Art by Jason Shawn Alexander.
  - Poison Elves: Parintachin, 3-issues mini-series, October 2001 – March 2002. Written and drawn by the Fillbach Brothers.
  - Poison Elves Companion, 1 issue, December 2002. By Drew Hayes, Keith Davidsen, Mark Smylie & the Fillbach Brothers. Lusiphur's allies and enemies, a complete map of Amrahly'nn, continuity guide, suggested reading chronology, new illustrations... Divided into five parts, (The Dark Wars, Lusiphur Malachi, Lusiphur's Allies, Lusiphur's Enemies, and Weapon Guide).
  - Poison Elves Sketchbook, by Drew Hayes & various, January 2003.
  - Poison Elves: Hyena, 4-issues mini-series, October 2004 – February 2005. Written by Keith Davidsen/Art by Scott Lewis.
  - Poison Elves: Ventures, 4-issues mini-series, May 2005 – April 2006. Written by Keith Davidsen/Art by Aaron Bordner. Each issue dedicated to a different character: Cassandra, Lynn, The Purple Marauder and Jace.
  - Poison Elves: Dominion, 6-issues mini-series, September 2005 – September 2006. Written by Keith Davidsen/Art by Scott Lewis. About Lusiphur's adventures prior to the Poison Elves series.
  - Poison Elves: Lost Tales, 11-issues series, January 2006 – April 2007. Written and drawn by Aaron Bordner. Self-contained stories about various characters from the Poison Elves universe.
- Primal Rage by Christopher Knowles (4 issues, 1996-1998
- Safety Belt Man by Robb Horan and Dark One (6 issues, 1994–1996)
- Scary Godmother by Jill Thompson (various short series and one-shots, 1997–2005)
- Super Information Hijinks: Reality Check! by Rosearik Rikki Simons (12 issues, 1996–Oct. 1998)
- Tower by Sean McKeever (2002)
