= Battle of the Planets (comics) =

Comic book series

Battle of the Planets is a comic book series, based on the television series of the same name. As of 2024 two series have been produced - the first was published by Gold Key Comics between 1979 and 1981; the second was published by Top Cow Productions between 2002 and 2003.

== Gold Key Comics ==
Battle of the Planets
- Cover to Gold Key Comics' Battle of the Planets #4, art by Winslow Mortimer

Publication information
- Publisher: Gold Key Comics
- Schedule: Bi-monthly
- Formats: Original material for the series has been published as a set of ongoing series.
- Genre: Science fiction
- Publication date: June 1979 - February 1981
- Number of issues: 10
- Main character(s): G-Force

Creative team
- Writer(s): Gary Poole; Bob Langhans; Charlie Seeger
- Artist(s): Winslow Mortimer

=== Creation ===
Sandy Frank had imported the anime series Science Ninja Team Gatchaman to America in 1978, retooling it as the syndicated Battle of the Planets with instant success. Wanting to exploit the licence, he linked up with Western Publishing, who put out a bi-monthly title via their Gold Key Comics subsidiary. At the time former DC Comics artist Winslow Mortimer was on the Gold Key staff and was assigned to draw the book. Initially each issue contained two stories of between 10 and 12 pages and were generally self-contained, formulaic affairs. The final two issues contained book-length 22-page stories.

=== Publishing history ===
The comic was hampered by distribution problems, as Western Publishing had recently been taken over by Mattel. The new owners wanted Gold Key to move away from single issue newsstand sales and towards their successful bagged comics series, whereby three issues were packed in a single bag and sold on a non-returnable basis to chains that didn't deal with returnable monthly comics; these were issued under Western's Whitman brand. As a result, the series suffered poor distribution, and was cancelled after 10 issues. Gold Key had planned storylines for at least another three issues, and art from the unpublished Battle of the Planets #11 has surfaced at auction.

=== Collected editions ===
In 2003, the Gold Key comics were compiled in the collection Battle of the Planets - The Classics, published by Dynamic Forces. This trade paperback removed the colour from the strips.

Title	ISBN	Release date	Issues
Battle of the Planets Classic Issues Volume 1		2003	Battle of the Planets #1-10

=== Other versions ===
A different Battle of the Planets strip was published in the UK weekly in TV Comic from 1981 to 1983, illustrated by Keith Watson.

=== Reception ===
Due to the lack of reference material passed on to the creative staff, the artwork was often variable, colouring errors were frequent and the plots were often considered lightweight.

== Top Cow Productions ==
Battle of the Planets
- Cover to Top Cow Productions' Battle of the Planets #12, art by Alex Ross

Publication information
Title(s)
Battle of the Planets
(12 issues, August 2002 - September 2003)
Battle of the Planets/Witchblade
(1 issue, February 2003)
Battle of the Planets Battlebook
(1 issue, May 2003)
Battle of the Planets/Thundercats
(1 issue, May 2003)
Battle of the Planets: Mark
(May 2003)
Battle of the Planets: Jason
(1 issue, July 2003)
Thundercats/Battle of the Planets
(1 issue, July 2003)
Battle of the Planets: Manga
(3 issues, November 2003 - January 2004)
Battle of the Planets: Princess
(6 issues, November 2004 - May 2005)
- Formats: Ongoing; Limited Series; One-shots
- Genre: Science fiction
- Publication date: August 2002 - May 2005
- Main character(s): G-Force

Creative team
- Writer(s): Munier Sharrieff; David Wohl
- Artist(s): Wilson Tortosa; Edwin David

=== Creation ===
While Battle of the Planets was largely dormant in North America after ending in 1981, the show developed a cult following. In 2001 a boom in 1980s nostalgia in the comics industry followed the successful revivals of G.I. Joe by Devil's Due Publishing and Transformers by Dreamwave Productions, with independent comics publishers scrambling to license similar properties. Top Cow Productions acquired the rights to make new Battle of the Planets comics, and were able to engage painter Alex Ross - a fan of the series growing up, and one of the most popular artists working in comics at the time following Earth X - as the series' art director. To build anticipation, a sketchbook of Ross' redesigns was printed in the pages of Wizard Magazine. Ross contributed designs and cover artwork; the series itself was written by Munier Sharrieff and featured art from Wilson Tortosa. Due to growing knowledge of the show's origins as Gatchaman and the desire to find a more adult audience for the book saw several of the elements added by Sandy Frank, such as the robot 7-Zark-7, omitted.

=== Publishing history ===
Initial sales were strong; Top Cow reported the first issue of the ongoing sold 150,000 copies, and the company swiftly planned a number of spin-off one-shots. These included individual comics focusing on the characters Mark, Jason and Princess. The latter was also a crossover with Top Cow's successful Witchblade, with art from Jo Chen. Another crossover was with WildStorm's ThunderCats revival; this saw Top Cow publish a Battle of the Planets/ThunderCats one-shot, with WildStorm reciprocating with ThunderCats/Battle of the Planets.

However, sales dropped off; the ongoing series was rebranded as a 'maxi series' but ended on a cliffhanger after twelve issues. A relaunch was planned for November 2003 with a six-issue G-Force mini-series but the title never appeared. Top Cow attempted another approach with the black-and-white Battle of the Planets - Manga, written by David Wohl and drawn by Edwin David, which ran for three issues. Wohl and Tortosa then produced a six-issue mini-series focusing on Princess. To resolve the cliffhanger from the regular title a two-issue mini-series, solicited first as Coup De Gras and then Endgame, was planned but never made it into print. The licences of both Top Cow and Sandy Frank for the property subsequently lapsed.

=== Collected editions ===
Title	ISBN	Release date	Contents
Battle of the Planets: Trial by Fire	9781840236071	26 March 2003	Battle of the Planets #1-3
Battle of the Planets: Blood Red Sky	9781582403236	21 December 2003	Battle of the Planets #4-9
Battle of the Planets: Destroy All Monsters	9781582403328	5 January 2004	Battle of the Planets #10-12, Battle of the Planets: Mark, Battle of the Planets: Jason and Battle of the Planets/Witchblade

=== Reception ===
The revival received mostly positive reviews from contemporary critics. However, in a 2022 retrospective article for Comic Book Resources, Gene Kendall questioned the series' willingness to shock fans, but praised Alex Ross' covers.

== See also ==
- List of comics based on television programs
