= Drew Hayes =

American graphic artist (1969-2007)

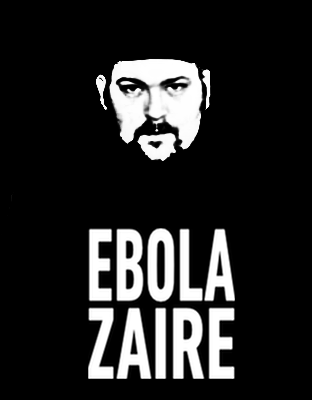
- Drew Hayes wearing his infamous "Ebola Zaire" T-shirt
- Born: Lawrence Andrew Hayes; July 20, 1969 Bellingham, Washington, US
- Died: March 21, 2007 (aged 37)
- Areas: Writer; penciller; inker
- Notable works: Poison Elves

Lawrence Andrew "Drew" Hayes (July 20, 1969 – March 21, 2007) was a writer and comic book artist who is best known as the creator of the long-running independent comic book series Poison Elves.

== Biography ==
Hayes' early influences included Dungeons & Dragons, Elfquest, and Cerebus.

Hayes began self-publishing I, Lusiphur under the Mulehide Graphics imprint in 1991. He changed the series title to Poison Elves with issue #8 (Feb 1993), and continued through issue #20 (Feb 1995). During this period, he was a prominent example of creators distributing their black-and-white comics to the direct market.

In 1995, Hayes brought Poison Elves to Sirius Entertainment; and, in 2000, according to Sirius publisher Robb Horan, Hayes "signed a long-term agreement for the property that was specifically intended to allow for an expanding universe and an unhindered continuation of the relationship under any circumstances." With Sirius, Hayes produced another 79 issues of Poison Elves and a color special, the last of which was published in September 2004. During this time, Hayes engaged in an ongoing mock "feud" with fellow comics creator Brian Bendis in the letters pages of their books. Sirius published twelve Poison Elves paperbacks, as well as a number of Poison Elves short series and one-shots, most of which were produced by other creative teams.

=== Death ===
Hayes suffered from health problems which hampered his ability to create comics. He was overweight, had suffered cardiac damage from sleep apnea, and had been hospitalized more than once. After undergoing treatment in the hospital and losing weight, he planned to resume creating new issues of Poison Elves, but died at the age of 37, of a heart attack while suffering from pneumonia.

== Works ==
- Deaththreats, The Life and Times of a Comic Book Rock Star (Sirius Entertainment, 2009, 384 pages, ISBN 978-1-579-89092-6) — collects all 100 of the Starting Notes from Poison Elves (annotated and illustrated to provide context), as well as extended excerpts from Hayes' Deathreats letter columns.

=== Poison Elves comics ===
- I, Lusiphur/Poison Elves
- Poison Elves Overstreet Fan Edition
- Lusipher and Lirilith
- Requiem for an Elf
- Traumatic Dogs
- Desert of the Third Sin
- Patrons
- The Mulehide Years (collection of vol 1–4)
- Sanctuary
- Guild War
- Salvation
- Rogues

=== Other art ===
- "Season in the Sun" (poster)
- "The Pub Scene" (color print)
- "Hyena" (B&W print)
- "Dryad" (color print)
- "Cover Prints"
- "Strange Attractors/Poison Elves Jam Poster" – with Michael Cohen.
- Poison Elves T-shirts (four different designs)
- Poison Elves Limited Edition Portfolio I – A set of six plates reprinting covers from Mulehide issues of the comic and a new plate.
- Poison Elves trading cards

=== Art in other comics ===
- Hunters printed in Elfquest—Hidden Years, #10, Blood of Ten Chiefs #4, and New Blood #13.
- Necromancer #3
- Moon Marauders (pinup )
- Strange Attractors #6-#8 (coloring for the cover art)
- Drew Fiend's Rare Bit Haze (appears in Roarin' Rick's Rare Bit Fiends #5)
- G.A.S.P. contains excerpt from Poison Elves #17
- Indy #10 for interview with Dan DeBono (cover art with Barry Blair)
- Wandering Star #9 (pinup art)
- Overstreet's Fan #7 (illustration of Lusiphur on the cover.)
- Overstreet's Fan #10 (cover art)
- The Crow (appears in Mythography #1)

=== Miscellaneous art ===
- "Lady Death Chromium II" (Card #64)
- "Strangers in Paradise Card Set" (Card #76)
