= Rob Schamberger =

American painter

Robert "Rob" Schamberger is an American painter known for his portraiture of professional wrestlers. He was the host of Canvas 2 Canvas on the WWE Network and YouTube until 2024.

== Personal life and education ==
Schamberger currently resides in Kansas City.

== Technique ==
Rob's technique involves the tracing and copying of promotional images or video stills to paper or canvas after which he uses various materials such as acrylic, watercolour, ink, and paint markers, to create his work. Often many materials are used in the same painting in a mixed media fashion. Schamberger uses synthetic round brushes in a variety of sizes as well as a painting knife to create his works. Regarding tracing, Schamberger himself has stated - "Man, I could give a damn."

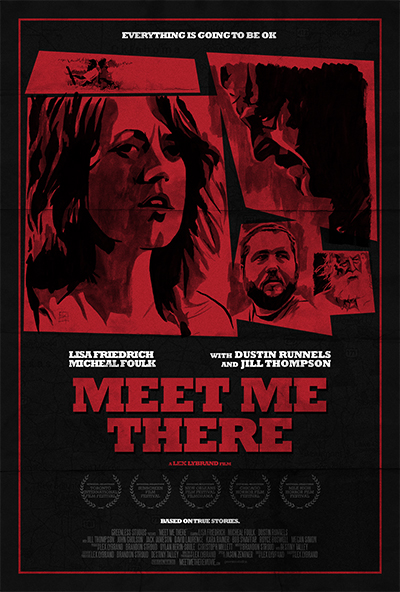
Meet Me There film poster with artwork from Schamberger

Schamberger utilizes unusual colour combinations and uses a technique not unlike the posturization tool in Photoshop to break down the original reference photos to create something unique when compared to the source material.

== Career ==
Schamberger hosts the Canvas 2 Canvas show on WWE's YouTube channel and the WWE Network. On the show, Schamberger unveils new portraits of past and current wrestlers.

Schamberger is the official WWE Artist in Residence.^{[7]} While Schamberger operates an independent store, most of his WWE artwork is purchased by the WWE organization and sold through their official storefronts and auctions. Schamberger's work is printed on a variety of WWE merchandise, including tee shirt designs.
