= Scary Godmother: Halloween Spooktakular =

2003 film

- Promotional release poster
- Genre: Comedy; Fantasy; Horror
- Created by: Jill Thompson
- Based on: Scary Godmother by Jill Thompson
- Written by: Heath Corson; Jill Thompson
- Directed by: Ezekiel Norton
- Voices of: Garry Chalk; Noel Callahan; Alex Doduk; Brittney Irvine; Britt McKillip; Danny McKinnon; Scott McNeil; Adam Pospisil; Tabitha St. Germain
- Music by: Bob Buckley
- Country of origin: Canada
- Original language: English

Production
- Executive producers: Brett Gannon; Kim Dent Wilder; Phil Mitchell
- Producers: Kevin Gamble; Sharan Wood
- Running time: 48 minutes
- Production company: Mainframe Entertainment

Original release
- Network: YTV
- Release: July 18, 2003 (SDCC) (Note: Later released on DVD in September 3, 2003, before airing on television the following month.)

Related
- Scary Godmother: The Revenge of Jimmy

Scary Godmother: Halloween Spooktakular is a 2003 Canadian animated television special. It is based on a stage adaptation of the first entry in the Scary Godmother series of books by Jill Thompson. A Mainframe Entertainment production, it depicts Hannah, while trick-or-treating with her cousin Jimmy and his friends, encountering the titular witch and her many friends for a Halloween party at the Fright Side. From a screenplay by Thompson and Heath Corson, it was directed by Zeke Norton (credited as Ezekiel Norton), and produced by Kevin Gamble and Sharan Wood.

Mainframe Entertainment first bought the option rights to the books in July 1999. The company's plan was to produce a special that would also serve as a pilot for a TV series. Pre-production started January 2002, before the start of actual production in July that lasted eight months with a team of up to 50 individuals. The hour-long special involved a different animation process from their past projects, in terms of a new animation pipeline and the beginning of their usage of proprietary software.

Scary Godmother: Halloween Spooktakular premiered at the 2003 San Diego Comic-Con. First released on region 1 DVD in September, it aired the following month for Halloween on YTV in Canada. One year later, it premiered on Cartoon Network in the United States to huge ratings. A sequel, Scary Godmother: The Revenge of Jimmy (2005), depicts Jimmy attempting to end the holiday to protect himself from the monsters in the Fright Side. An episodic series, however, was never produced. Both specials continued to re-air every Halloween season on Cartoon Network up to 2014. Scary Godmother: Halloween Spooktakular has enjoyed a positive critical reception since its release.

== Plot ==
Actor		Character(s)
Tabitha St. Germain		Scary Godmother, Countess Ruby
Britt McKillip		Hannah Marie
Alex Doduk		Jimmy
Scott McNeil		Mr. Skully Pettibone, Count Max
Garry Chalk		Bug-A-Boo, Harry
Adam Pospisil		Orson
Danny McKinnon		Bert
Noel Callahan		Daryl
Brittney Irvine		Katie

On Halloween night, Hannah Marie is about to go trick-or-treating with her older cousin, Jimmy, and his friends Katie, Daryl, and Bert. Jimmy, annoyed with having to go with Hannah, conceives a prank to scare her home. While near an abandoned house in a graveyard, Jimmy concocts a myth about former residents at what he calls the "Spook House" not feeding candy to monsters surrounding its exterior and being devoured; ever since, candy has to be in the basement every year to prevent the monsters from killing children. Tasked by Jimmy, a frightened Hannah walks in the front door while the other kids lock her inside, and this causes her to burst into tears.

But then, a friendly red-headed witch, along with her ghost cat Boozle, magically appears in front of Hannah and introduces herself as the Scary Godmother. She takes her on a broomstick ride to the Fright Side, a place where the Godmother's other friends live: Mr. Skully Pettibone the skeleton, Harry the werewolf, a fuzzy monster that works scaring kids named Bug-A-Boo, and a vampire family of parents Count Max and Countess Ruby, and 8-year-old son Orson. Although at first frightened of the monsters, Hannah eventually warms up to them and takes part in their annual "phantom fest". After waiting hours outside the Spook House, Jimmy, Katie, Bert, and Daryl, worried about Hannah's safety and the legitimacy of Jimmy's legend, enter the house to search for her.

Near the end of the party, Hannah tells the guests about the myth Jimmy told her. Jimmy's name reminds Bug-A-Boo, who scares Jimmy every Thursday; the monster is angry with Jimmy because he spreads rumors that Bug-A-Boo eats little girls. Scary Godmother and her friends decide to play a prank on Jimmy and his friends in response, which ends with Hannah pretending to scare away the monsters. The kids take the monsters as real and bolt out of the house. Before Hannah leaves, the Godmother gives her a skeleton key to go back to the Fright Side anytime.

== Background ==
Jill Thompson's Scary Godmother series of books began in 1997 out of the author's obsession with Halloween and to add a "twisted-friendly" solution to the children's book market: "I wanted there to be a little Addams Family-esque attitude in there. I've always been drawn to things that were a little bit more black comedy". It became a mainstream success, which another artist and writer on comics Scott McCloud attributed to its "enlightened, mature fantasy" genre unusual in the mid-1990s: "Scary Godmother just hit that perfect note. It was so enjoyable, stylish, but it didn't feel homogenized or robbed of vitality".

Scary Godmother: Halloween Spooktakular is based on a stage production of the first Scary Godmother book done by Thompson and Runamuck Productions that ran at a Chicago community theater in 2001. The special features longer shots than most other animated films, each lasting between 15 and 45 seconds, a decision by director Zeke Norton to emphasize the dialog's humor he noticed in the stage show.

== Development ==
In July 1999, Mainframe Entertainment garnered option rights to produce a Scary Godmother television series. Initially, Mainframe's plan was a series for girls ages 8–11 with a budget of $350,000 for each of the 26-half-hour episodes. By 2001, the number of planned episodes for the first season was 13. Later on, conflicting opinions arose between staff over what Scary Godmother content to produce; some, such as Mainframe vice president Kim Dent Wilder, felt it was better long-term to make a television series, while others thought the books would not work as an episodic show but rather as specials. To appeal to both sides, Mainframe decided to have a special that increased interest in a series and introduced the setting and characters for it. While the only Scary Godmother media Mainframe has released is two specials, Halloween Spooktakular and The Revenge of Jimmy (2005), Norton and Thompson revealed in 2020 that a television series was still in the works.

== Production ==
=== Workflow ===
Scary Godmother: Halloween Spooktakular entered pre-production in January 2002 before beginning what would be eight months of production in July. The production team went from 25 animators, including "10 people who were there for most of it", to 50 individuals that included those working in-between other projects. Thompson was heavily involved in the development and production: "I co-wrote the show, worked as an editor, I directed art, I illustrated expression sheets, chose voices, suggested music, designed sets, [and] painted backgrounds (or anything else that was needed or helpful)". She was in her Chicago studio during production, so she faxed drawings and paintings to Norton while Mainframe sent videotapes of progress to the artist, which included storyboards, wireframe animations, and fully-rendered visuals. As the special was an hour-long project produced by a small crew testing new software, Mainframe's production protocol was altered significantly; for example, details about shots, such as quantities of them and their order of appearance, were documented on a gigantic whiteboard, whereas before the staff would learn about them during editing.

=== Casting ===
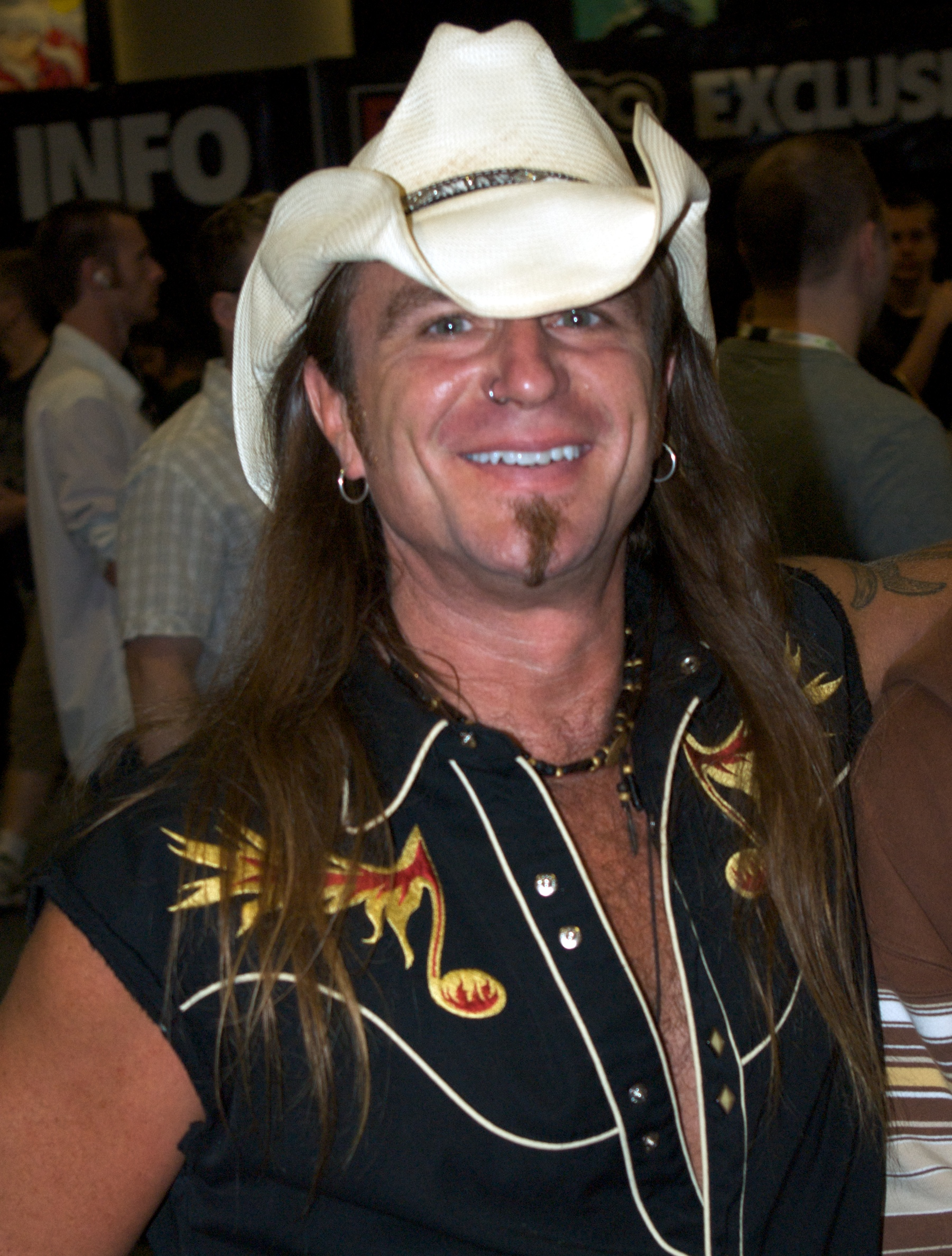
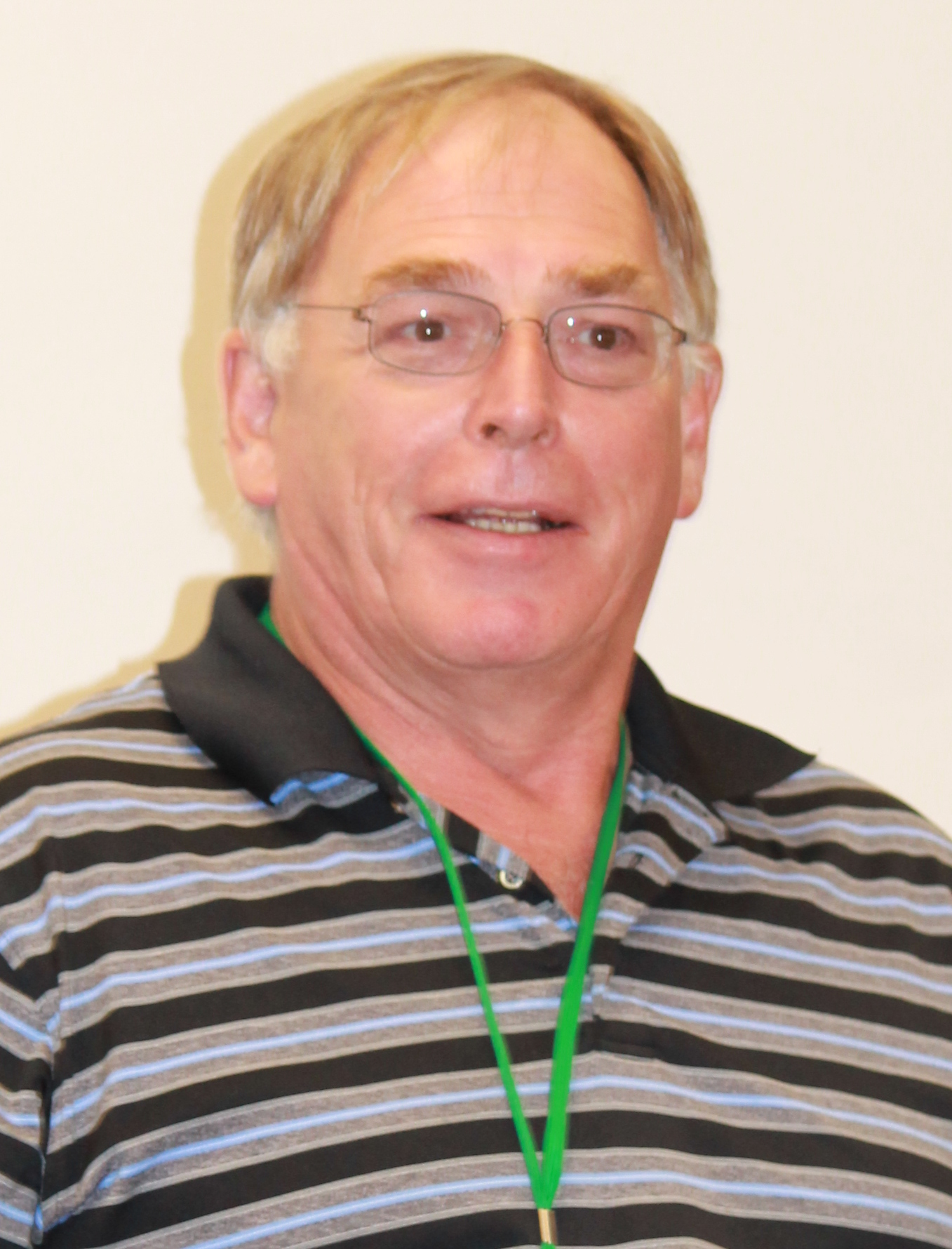
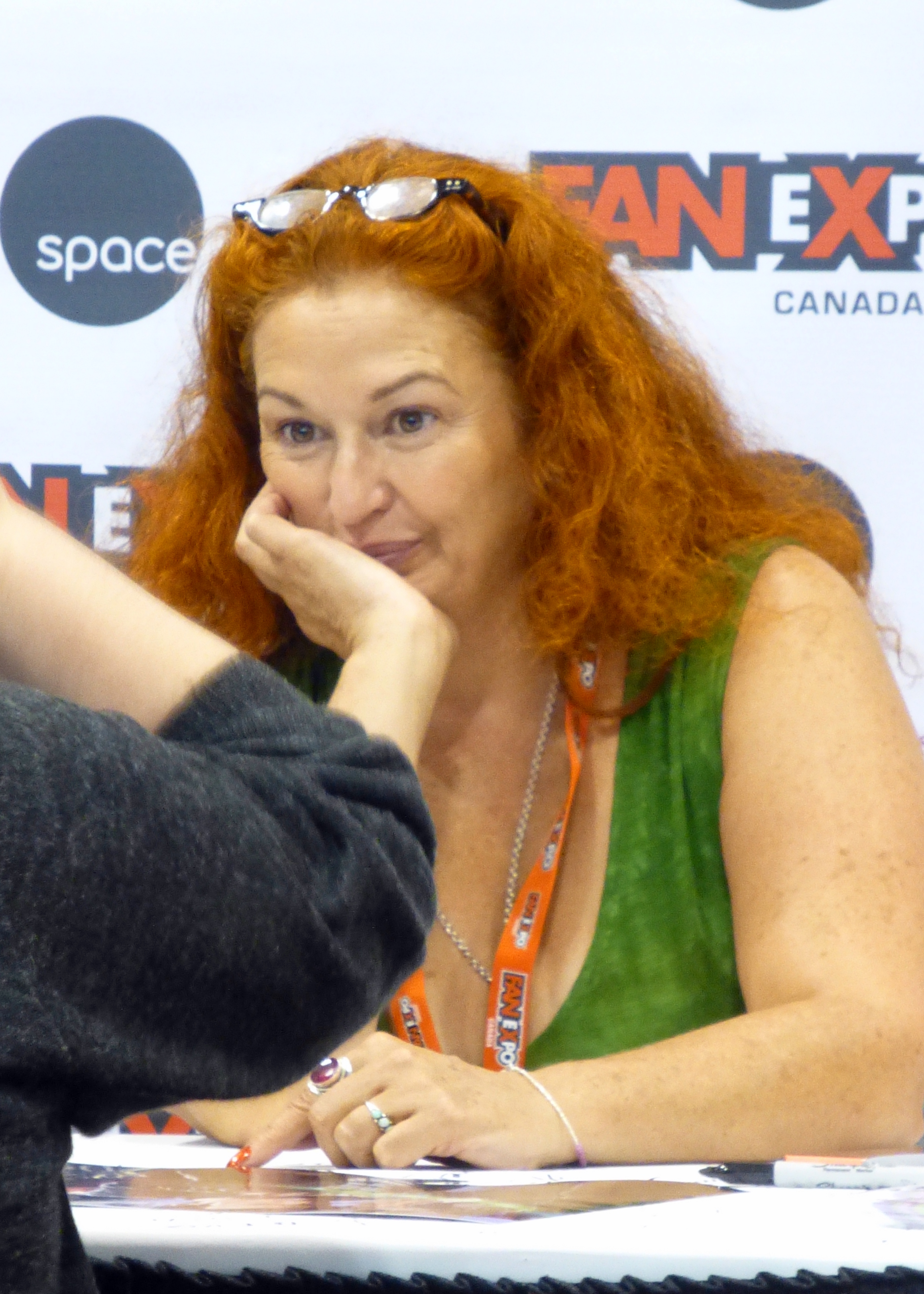
Scary Godmother: Halloween Spooktakular's limited budget meant voice actors such as Scott McNeil (left), Garry Chalk (middle) and Tabitha St. Germain (right) were cast for multiple characters.

As with prior Mainframe projects, all actors were cast locally from Vancouver (some of whom had previously voiced in works by the animation studio) and recorded together in the same room. To get around the limited budget, some actors were hired to voice two characters each; Tabitha St. Germain was cast as Scary Godmother and Countess Ruby, Garry Chalk played Bug-a-Boo and Harry, and Scott McNeil portrayed Mr. Skully Pettibone and Count Max.

Most of the actresses that auditioned for the Scary Godmother put on, in Thompson's opinion, a creepy "Wicked Witch type of voice" unsuitable for the character; this was also the case with auditions for the stage show. Thompson described the witch as enthusiastic and only a little goofier than the average person, and she felt St. Germain's voice matched it.

Harry, who is an item collector and comic book fanatic, was based on fans of Thompson's work who were also collectors, thus she looked for someone that could replicate indescribable speech patterns common with them. The affectations were based the most on one fan who she described in a published interview as into "creepy fan art drawings" but refused to reveal his name to not embarrass him; at a convention, the fan was upset at Thompson for not mentioning him.

=== Animation ===
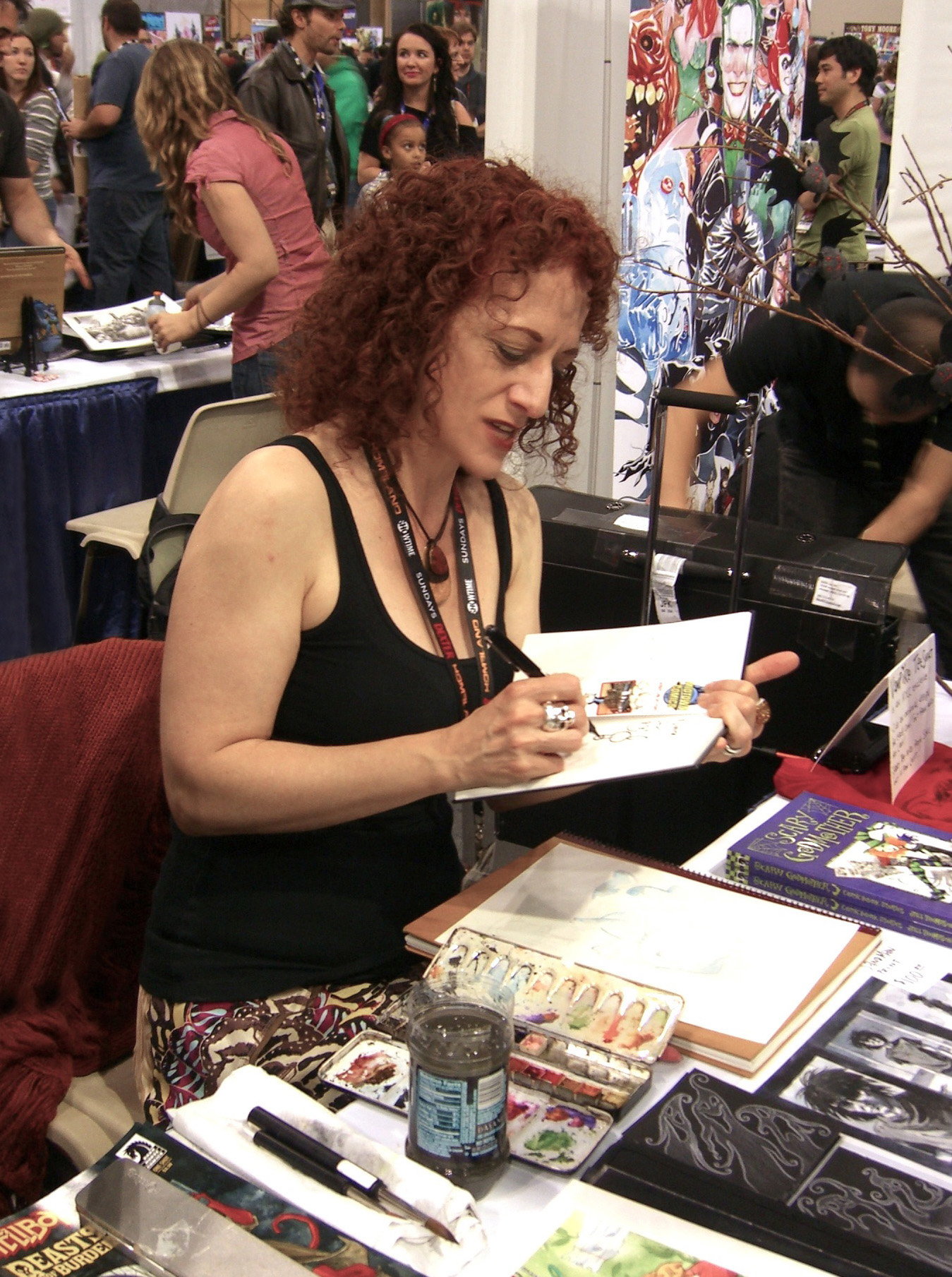
Scary Godmother series author Jill Thompson in 2011. She contributed her own paintings to the production, which would be used both as 2D image layers and textures on 3D sets.

Mainframe produced Halloween Spooktakular with 12 iterations of a new SoftimageXSI pipeline, moving away from Softimage 3D. Rendering was done with Mental Ray, while layers were composited together with XSI's FX Tree; the maximum number of layers for a shot was 30. The pipeline also had a setup where shots could be archived, re-looked at, and altered. 20 Hewlett-Packard and Dell computers running on a Linux operating system were utilized. Most backgrounds were modeled in 3D, with geometry sculpted with XSI and texturing done with GIMP and Photoshop; one method of replicating the source material's visual style was through black edging 3D objects with XSI's Toon Shader. There were also 2D animated backgrounds created with After Effects for the flash-animated "treats" scene, the dance, and the Scary Godmother's special recipe conjure. Thompson provided her own artwork for 2D images and 3D background textures; she watercolor-painted four angles of 3D sets first before parts of them were used as textures.

Being animated in key frames, the film's long shot lengths called for XSI's Animation Mixer, which allowed for the re-use and "blend[ing]" together of cycles; this was especially useful for the dance and chase scenes in the Godmother's home. As Norton explained: "We could quickly throw the characters together in a scene with general [animation] cycles, choose the spots where specific keyframed animation was needed, and then use the Animation Mixer to smoothly blend in the [new] movement". Animation Mixer was also used to blend and re-use facial expressions created with the lip-syncing tool Grimace. Indian dances, the Peanuts specials, the dream scene from The Big Lebowski (1998), and Scooby-Doo cartoons from the 1960s and 1970s were references for animating the dance sequence.

Fur was not only added to all of Harry and Bugaboo, but also on the Godmother's hair and skirt and Hannah's tutu. Due to Mainframe's originally-programmed fur-texturing software not being compatible with the new pipeline, XSI's built-in fur simulation was employed instead. The fur was the most difficult part of animating the special, particularly when it came to Bugaboo; because he was animated with several complex forward and inverse kinematics, "the extreme poses often made the hair do interesting things that we didn't want it to do, such as sticking straight up or even protruding through the character's mouth", according to Norton. These issues were hidden with FX Tree. The clouds seen during Hannah's flight with the Scary Godmother were another major challenge; they were modeled by displacement mapping simple sheets and balls, before FX Tree added several turbulent distortion, swirl, and blur effects to make them look fluffy and light. The clouds were presented by Softimage as part of an FX Tree showcase for the 2003 SIGGRAPH event.

=== Visual style ===
Hannah, Jimmy, Bert, Daryl, and Katie all meeting each other at a graveyard. The characters are animated in typical 3D CGI, while objects in the backgrounds are black-edged to give them a 2D cartoon feel.

In a 2001 interview, Dan DiDio, Mainframe's senior VP of creative affairs, admitted other investors were holding television computer-animated productions to the same standard as theatrical films; to avoid these comparisons, the company stylized their animation with productions like Scary Godmother: Halloween Spooktakular. It was the first production where Mainframe used proprietary software; this led to more flexibility and tools to experiment, making it easier to achieve a unique visual style that Karen Moltenbrey of Computer Graphics World categorized as more reminiscent of The Nightmare Before Christmas (1993) than modern 3D animated films.

The company's initial vision was being animated entirely in the same 2D watercolor painting style as the books, but Thompson decided that her characters be animated in 3D, a decision influenced by her love of stop-motion films such as The Nightmare Before Christmas; the final result was 3D CGI characters animated in front of what looked like still, 2D hand-drawn watercolor backgrounds (although most of them were modeled in 3D). Moltenbrey wrote that this diversity extended to the character designs, from the wide-eyed, anime look of Hannah to the simplistic style used for Jimmy and his friends to the softer, more sophisticated appearance of the creatures. One character design liberty was with Pettibone, who wore clothes in the books so Thompson did not have to draw his rib cage but wore nothing in the special as animating cloth would have required too much processing power.

== Release ==
In addition to a sneak peek trailer on Mainframe's website, Scary Godmother: Halloween Spooktakular was promoted with tie-ins from Halloween shops and candy producers. The special premiered at the 2003 San Diego Comic-Con on July 18 to favorable audience reception reported by Comic Book Resources: "As the special continued, there was more applause each time a familiar character appeared onscreen, with the biggest hand going to the arrival of the show's title character. It was clear the show was a hit from the start with this audience of devoted Thompson fans, with lots of laughter and appreciative applause and cheers throughout". It was also screened on Halloween at the Biograph Theatre for the first animation event of the Chicago International Film Festival, and on Halloween 2004 at the ION International Animation, Gaming and Short Film Festival as part of the annual event's "Kids Day".

Halloween Spooktakular was released on region 1 DVD on September 3, before making television debuts in Canada, Europe, and Latin America in October of that year. It aired in Canada on three afternoons on the YTV channel (October 26, 30, and 31) and on Disney International networks in Asia, Latin America, Germany, and Italy. It had its first television screening in the United States on Cartoon Network on October 1, 2004, and re-aired that month three times (October 12, 29, and 31). Also in the United States, it was released to DVD in September in two editions, one of which came with a glow-stick.

== Reception ==
Scary Godmother: Halloween Spooktakular, on its first United States airing, was the most-viewed cable program with kids 6-11, boys 6-11, kids 2-11 and boys 2-11; with 1,051,000 viewers from the kids 6-11 demographic, it was the highest-rated Cartoon Network special of 2004 with kids 6-11, boys 6-11 and boys 2-11, and improved viewership with kids 6-11 by 55% and its rating 54%. The special won three Leo Awards; Brett Gannon, Kim Dent Wilder, Phil Mitchell, Sharan Wood and Kevin Gamble won Best Animation Program or Series, Robert Buckley received the Best Musical Score accolade, and Ezekiel Norton received an award for Best Direction/Storyboarding in an Animation Program or Series.

Critical reviews of Scary Godmother: Halloween Spooktakular were also generally positive, critics calling it "a little dark, a little scary and fun", and "an instant classic". Its character designs were praised as "eye-catching" by Tim Clodfelter despite its "limited" animation quality, and considered high-class for Mainframe's otherwise "pedestrian" standards by ICv2. Chris Hicks, writing for the Deseret News, favorably noted the "witty" dialogue and voice acting, while Clodfelter praised the characters, particularly highlighting Harry. Ellen Fox of the Chicago Tribune, however, was turned off by its overabundance of content: "Between the chirpy dialogue, busy backgrounds, jerky limb movements and campy monsters (like the skeleton in the closet), it's like a marionette show put on by drag queens".

== Sequel ==
Promotional release poster

A sequel, Scary Godmother: The Revenge of Jimmy, was produced in three months by a team of 14 animators using the same keyframe technique as the original special. It is based on the second book in the book series of the same name, which was released in 1998. Ezekiel Norton returned as director with a screenplay by Ian Boothby, comic book author and creator of comic book series based on Matt Groening TV series such as Futurama and The Simpsons. All but four characters had their voice actors reprise. Alexander Ludwig, who would later star in big-budget theatrical releases such as The Seeker (2007), Race to Witch Mountain (2009), and the first film in The Hunger Games series (2012), replaced Doduk in the title role of Jimmy. Orson is voiced by Richard Warke replacing Pospisil, Bert is voiced by Dexter Bell taking over McKinnon, and Daryl by Nathan Tipple replacing Callahan.

The Revenge of Jimmy takes place a year after the original, and follows Jimmy's plan to end Halloween as protection from the monsters he and his friends encountered the year before. His property damage towards the pumpkin patch, candy and costume store, and the Spook House places the existence of the Fright Side in danger. Hannah, however, successfully gets around these hurdles by making the smashed pumpkin holes serve as mouths, making new treats like s'mores, and imagining the toilet paper on the house as ghosts, putting the Fright Side universe back together and stable. The special culminates in the monsters' annual party. Daryl, Bert and Katie are introduced to the Fright Side and the Monsters by Hannah, while Jimmy, accidentally scaring Bug-A-Boo in another failed attempt to end Halloween, wins a Best Costume award for his devil costume. Jimmy is back to normal, and the party commences.

The special was released by Anchor Bay Entertainment to DVD on August 29, 2005, with bonus features such as deleted scenes, storyboards, and interview segments such as a Fright Side Chat. It premiered on Cartoon Network on October 7, at 7:30 PM, and re-aired on the network that month five times (at a later time on October 7, 10, 18, 30, and 31). Halloween Spooktakular also had five airings on the network that month. In Canada, it aired three times on YTV on October 25, 29, and 30 the same year. The sequel was nominated for Best Animated Production by the Canadian Awards for the Electronic and Animated Arts.

== Legacy ==
Both specials became an annual tradition for Cartoon Network to air during the Halloween season. The latest reported airing was in October 2012. They were also included on compilation DVDs, including a PAL region Kids' Collection release alongside The Happy Elf (2005) and Everyone's Hero (2006) and Lionsgate's 2014 Kids Halloween 4-Pack that also featured two episodes from other cartoon series ("Eloise's Rawther Unusual Halloween" and "Wubbzy Goes Boo!"). Both Scary Godmother specials became available on the Canadian streaming service Crave in 2020.

In the 2020s, Scary Godmother: Halloween Spooktakular became a nostalgic cult classic and staple of the fall season for Generation Z, inspiring fan art, internet memes, and a trend of TikTok videos of people syncing to the show's audio or dressing up as characters from the special. An unofficial DVD-quality YouTube upload garnered, as of 2021, three million views and 10,000 comments, several of which expressed disappointment the special no longer re-ran on Cartoon Network.

Retrospective coverage recommends Scary Godmother: Halloween Spooktakular as a non-frightening, family-friendly Halloween film, despite its perceived dated animation. Kristen Harris of BuzzFeed acclaimed it as a "cute and nostalgic" "fever dream". A writer on vampires in fiction, Brad Middleton, in his book Un-Dead TV: The Ultimate Guide to Vampire Television (2015), called it a "fantastic Halloween special" with a strong story and a high quantity of funny characters.

In 2026 the specials were restored in HD from the original D1 Master Tapes by Reboot Rewind team while they acquired three tape decks when working on the documentary on the show ReBoot.

Mainframe Studios uploaded both films on their official YouTube channel.

== See also ==
- List of Cartoon Network original films
- List of fictional witches
- List of films set around Halloween
- List of Halloween television specials
