= Mark Crilley =

American comic artist

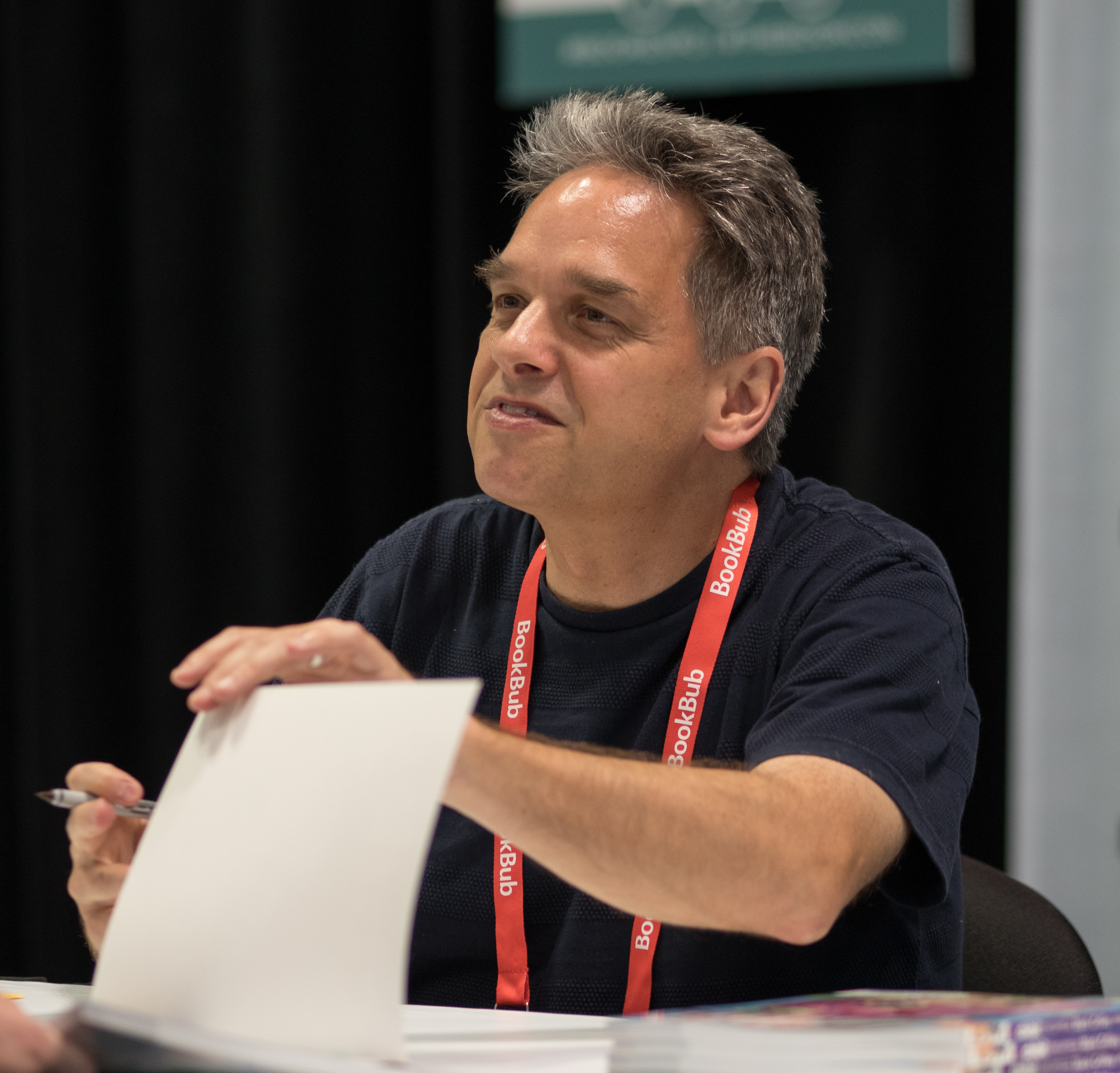
- Crilley at BookExpo America in 2018
- Born: May 21, 1966 (age 60); Detroit, Michigan, United States
- Occupations: Artist, Illustrator, Author, and Comic Book Writer/Graphic Novelist
- Spouse: Miki Crilley
- Children: 2
- Writing career
- Notable works: Akiko, Miki Falls, Brody's Ghost, The Drawing Lesson, Mastering Manga,
- Website: www.markcrilley.com

Mark Crilley (born May 21, 1966) is an American comic creator, artist and children's book author and illustrator. He is the creator of Miki Falls and Brody's Ghost. He produces instructional videos on drawing on YouTube in various styles, including manga-styles. He was at one point an English teacher in Fukushima, Japan, as well as Changhua County, Taiwan.

== Early life ==
Mark Crilley was born and raised in Detroit, Michigan, United States to Robert and Virginia Crilley. He began drawing from a very young age. He graduated from the University of Detroit Jesuit High School in 1984, proceeding to Kalamazoo College, where he befriended children's book writer/illustrator (and 2001 Caldecott award winner) David Small. Small greatly affected Crilley artistic development as an illustrator and writer.

Upon graduating from college in 1988, Crilley moved to Taiwan, then Japan, and once more in Taiwan in 1993. He made his living by teaching English. It was while living in Japan, in the fall of 1992, that Crilley came up with the comic book Akiko and created his first adventure comic book.

== Akiko ==
Akiko is an American comic book series written and drawn by Crilley and published by Sirius Entertainment. The series ran for fifty-two issues and was a thirteen-time Eisner nominee. The comics have spawned a series of ten children novels from Random House Children's Books. The collection includes:

- Akiko on the Planet Smoo (March 2001)
- Akiko in the Sprubly Islands (September 2001)
- Akiko and the Great Wall of Trudd (March 2001)
- Akiko in the Castle of Alia Rellapor (September 2001) (ends adaptations from comic)
- Akiko and the Intergalactic Zoo (April 2002) (original stories begin)
- Akiko and the Alpha Centauri 5000 (March 2003)
- Akiko and the Journey to Toog (September 2003)
- Akiko The Training Master (February 2005)
- Akiko Pieces of Gax (November 2006)
- Akiko Flights of Fancy
- Akiko and the Missing Misp (November 2008)

The story has been described as a cross between The Wizard of Oz and Star Wars, centering on the adventures of Akiko, a Japanese American girl, on and around the planet Smoo, and other whimsical lands. She is accompanied by her alien friends, Mr. Beeba the well-read professor, the courageous but impulsive Spuckler, Gax the worn down, kind robot, and Poog, the Toogolian, floating, purple head.

== Miki Falls ==
Miki Falls is an OEL manga series created by Crilley and published by HarperCollins under its HarperTeen imprint. It is structured as a four-volume series; each book taking place during one of the seasons over the course of a year. It follows the main protagonist Miki Yoshida in her senior year of high school, and she plans of making it the better year yet. However, a strange new boy arrives in town and Miki is going to find out what he's up to. It has been optioned for development as a feature film by Paramount and Brad Pitt's productions company.

== Brody's Ghost ==
Brody's Ghost is a comic book series published by Dark Horse Comics. The story, set in the near future, is that of a young man unaware of his psychic abilities. Only when he is approached by a ghost girl named Talia in need of his help he begins with a training process to awaken and master his powers.

Book One in the Brody's Ghost series was released July 14, 2010. Book Two was released in 2011. Book 3 was released in May 2012. Book 4 was released April 2013. Upon release, the series received positive feedback including a grade B+ from Detroit News's Eric Henrickson.

Brody's Ghost contains several differences from Crilley's previous work, Miki Falls. The story follows a male main character and contains more action and fighting sequences.

== How-to-draw books ==
Crilley has published three manga-drawing instruction books: Mastering Manga, Mastering Manga 2: Level Up with Mark Crilley, and Mastering Manga 3: Power Up with Mark Crilley. In addition to these three manga books, Crilley has published The Realism Challenge (2015), a book on drawing hyper-realistic drawings of everyday objects, and The Drawing lesson (2017), a graphic novel that aims at teaching readers how to draw through the adventures of David and his mentor.

== Personal life ==
Crilley distributes drawing advice to artists via YouTube videos and his DeviantArt account. His YouTube videos teach beginners how to draw various manga and anime characters, as well as animals, how to use perspective, and more. In August 2010, he starred in some how-to-draw videos for Funimation on demand. Crilley's wife, Miki Crilley, whom he named Miki (the character in Miki Falls) after, is from Japan. The two have a daughter, Mio, and a son, Matthew.

== See also ==
- Lost in Taiwan
