= Scary Godmother =

Series of children's books by Jill Thompson

- The third book in the series
- Author: Jill Thompson
- Original title: Scary Godmother
- Language: English
- Subject: Halloween
- Publication place: United States

Scary Godmother is a series of children's books and comic books created by artist Jill Thompson and published by Sirius Entertainment beginning in 1997.

== Characters ==
=== Main ===
- Hannah Marie is scared of monsters, but then she realizes that monsters don't eat kids. Hannah is very kind and friendly, and it is implied that she has a crush on Orson, a young male vampire. In the first TV-special, her older cousin, Jimmy, and his friends scare her, but the monsters on the Fright Side help her get back at them in the end. She dresses as a fairy princess. She is voiced by Britt McKillip.
- Scary Godmother is a tall, skinny and pretty-looking fairy-witch with long curly red hair, pale green skin, small bat wings on her back, and purple and green leggings. She lives on the Fright Side (a world where scary Halloween monsters live). She befriends a little girl named Hannah Marie, who was scared by her older cousin Jimmy into holding the doorknob to the haunted house Scary Godmother and her "broommates" were in. She also rides a broom and has a pet ghost cat named Boozle. Thompson has acknowledged that the character bears a resemblance to its creator. Her voice was done by Tabitha St. Germain in the TV adaptation.
- Jimmy is Hannah's cousin who has little affection for her. Since he did not want to take her trick or treating, he and his friends instead plan on scaring her, but his plan backfires after Hannah befriends Scary Godmother and her broommates, all of whom give Jimmy and his friends a taste of their own medicine. A year later, he was so traumatized by that ordeal that he tried to stop Halloween from happening (by destroying all Halloween-related items, like pumpkins, costumes and candy), but is otherwise touched when he stumbles into a party that Scary Godmother, Hannah, and their friends were celebrating. He often dresses in a Devil sweatsuit on Halloween. He was the antagonist of the first and second books, but in the ending of second and the rest of the series he became good.
- Jimmy's friends are Jimmy's three companions, whom he talked into scaring his cousin, Hannah, when she first went trick-or-treating. Unlike Jimmy, they are not bad children, just easily influenced. They were content with Hannah's company, and even helped her save Halloween when Jimmy tried to ruin it once.
  - Bert is a boy and the most imaginative of the three. He dresses as a baseball player wearing a cardboard SUV around his body.
  - Daryl is sweet and naïve, dresses as a piece of candy and has a crush on Katie.
  - Katie is the most empathic of the three. Katie has a crush on Daryl, which is revealed when she tells him she will trade him chocolate bar for a kiss, though also at times it seems she likes Jimmy. Katie dresses as a black cat. She is voiced by Britt Irvin.

=== Monsters ===
- Mr. Skully Pettibone is one of Scary Godmother's "broommates". He is the skeleton that hides in people's closets to keep their secrets safe, and, as he puts it, just rattle around. He likes to come at a good party for Halloween. His characterization in the books, and to a greater extent in the animated specials, is to a large extent that of a stereotypical "female lead's gay best friend", as suggested by his repeatedly coming out of closets. His voice was done by Scott McNeil.
- Bug-A-Boo is a huge, round monster with multiple yellow eyes, fur, a pointy tail, horns and a huge mouth with sharp teeth. He is the type of monster that lurks in places like basements, under beds, in closets, and other deep, dark places (and knows what children are scared of, even Jimmy and his friends). Frightened of him at first, Hannah perceived him as the "monster in the basement" that Jimmy told her would eat children lest she feeds him candy. While she does that, Bug-A-Boo tells her that his job is to scare children, not eat them. They have since become great friends. His voice was done by Garry Chalk.
- Harry is a talkative werewolf who wears a blue, lamb-patterned shirt. He hails from Ackerman Forest (a pun on horror honcho Forrest J Ackerman) which is somewhere in the Fright Side. With a hammy, self-absorbed and pitying personality and an insatiable appetite for food (especially candy and snacks), he is a huge nuisance to Scary Godmother and her broommates. Harry is a big fan of the TV "skelevision" show The Spectral Six. It is notable however that while annoying, Harry is still a full-grown male werewolf possessing razor-sharp claws and fangs, incredible strength, and highly acute lupine senses. It would be unwise to get between Harry and something he wants, especially if it is anything food-related. His voice was done by Garry Chalk.
- Count Max is a tall, thin and bald vampire dressed in black. The most famous vampire on the Fright Side, he is the "King of the Night". Usually very old-fashioned, Max feels awkward for being so out of touch with the times. His visual design is suggestive of that of Count Orlok in Murnau's Nosferatu as played by Max Schreck and his vocal characterization of Béla Lugosi impersonators. His voice was done by Scott McNeil.
- Ruby is Max's beautiful wife who is also a vampire and the "Queen of the Night". She is more "modern" than her husband, which drives him batty. She has long, black hair and is clad in a satin dress. Her appearance recalls that of 1950s horror show hostess Vampira. Her voice was also done by Tabitha St. Germain in a Russian accent.
- Orson is Max & Ruby's preteen son who is a vampire like his parents. He is the "Prince of the Night". Orson wears modern goth clothing, thin round glasses and has blue dyed hair. In the TV-specials, it is implied but never confirmed that he has a crush on Hannah (and that she may reciprocate his feelings). In the book versions, it is confirmed that Orson does in fact have a crush on Hannah. His voice is done by Richie Warke.

== Development ==
Thompson described the work and the character this way: "Scary Godmother is like your fairy godmother, but for Halloween. There's really nothing scary about the Scary Godmother. She's fun and macabre; reminiscent of childhood with a little bit of social commentary mixed in". She said that "comics are so segregated now" and that she wanted to create something that both young readers and adults could enjoy. She decided to create something with a Halloween theme after looking for a Halloween-themed children's book for her niece and not finding anything that she liked. The books employ a combination of storybook/comic formats. Thompson does the interiors as well as the covers for Scary Godmother, and she said that planning ahead and meeting deadlines can be a challenge.

== Comics ==
- Scary Godmother. Sirius Entertainment. 09/1997. Book.
- Bloody Valentine Special. SIRIUS Entertainment. 02/1998. Comic.
- Revenge of Jimmy. SIRIUS Entertainment. 09/1998. Book.
- Holiday Spooktacular. SIRIUS Entertainment. 11/1998. Comic.
- The Mystery Date. SIRIUS Entertainment. 09/1999. Book.
- Wild About Harry. SIRIUS Entertainment. 02/2000 - 04/2000. Comic miniseries (3 issues).
- The Boo Flu. SIRIUS Entertainment. 09/2000. Book.
- Activity Book. SIRIUS Entertainment. 12/2000. Comic.
- Wild About Harry TPB. SIRIUS Entertainment. 09/2001. Collecting Scary Godmother: Wild About Harry #1–#3.
- Scary Godmother. SIRIUS Entertainment. May 2001 - February 2002. Comic miniseries (6 issues).
- Ghoul's Out for Summer TPB. SIRIUS Entertainment. 07/2002. Collecting Scary Godmother mini-series #1–#6.
- Spooktacular Stories TPB. SIRIUS Entertainment. 08/2004. Collecting Scary Godmother Summer Preview 1997, Bloody Valentine Special, Activity Book, Holiday Spooktakular.
- Scary Godmother HC. Dark Horse Comics. 10/2010. Collecting Scary Godmother, Revenge of Jimmy, The Mystery Date, and The Boo Flu.
- Scary Godmother Comic-Book Stories TPB. Dark Horse Comics. 06/2011. Collecting Scary Godmother #1–6: Ghoul's Out for Summer; Scary Godmother: Holiday Spooktacular; Scary Godmother: Bloody Valentine Special; Scary Godmother: Activity Book; Scary Godmother: Wild About Harry #1-3; Scary Godmother and Friends Ashcan; Scary Godmother: Six Feet South of the Border from Action Girl #13; and more.

== Awards ==
- The original book Scary Godmother was a top votegetter for the Comics Buyer's Guide Fan Awards for Favorite Original Graphic Novel for 1998.
- 1998 - nominated for the Lulu of the Year Lulu Award
- 1999 - won the Lulu of the Year Lulu Award
- 2001 - Eisners for Best Title for a Younger Audience and Best Painter/Multimedia Artist (Interior)

== Film adaptations ==
Two films have been produced based on the series. The first, Scary Godmother: Halloween Spooktakular, premiered on television in Europe, Latin America, Australia, and Canada in 2003. Later, it premiered in the United States on Cartoon Network in 2004. The film was the first one Mainframe Entertainment used its new software/animation pipeline for. Jill Thompson co-wrote the script, and had some creative control over the project. When she was shown early character designs for the film which resembled the watercolor illustrations in her books, she requested that the characters instead be fully computer-generated. In an interview, Thompson stated that she wanted them to go with CGI because "I'm doing 2D. Nobody else should be doing 2D, just me". The mostly static backgrounds used in the film, however, more closely resemble traditional cel animation or the illustrations in Thompson's books. Because of that, the 3D characters often appear to "pop out" from their backgrounds. The visual style of the film has been described as resembling that of Tim Burton's The Nightmare Before Christmas rather than that of computer-animated films such as Finding Nemo. A review of the film in School Library Journal, however, described the film as "Toy Story meets Tim Burton", and thought that the animation closely resembles Thompson's watercolor illustrations.

The second, Scary Godmother: The Revenge of Jimmy (based on the second book), premiered in 2005.
