= Miki Falls =

OEL manga series

- Cover of Miki Falls vol. 1 (2007), art by Mark Crilley
- Genre: School
- Author: Mark Crilley
- Publisher: HarperTeen
- Original run: 2007
- Volumes: 4

Miki Falls is an original English-language manga series written and illustrated by Mark Crilley. It is structured as a four-volume series, each book taking place during one of the seasons over the course of a year.

== Plot ==
Miki Falls is set in the small town of Fukuyama, Japan. Miki Yoshida is starting her senior year at Fukuyama High School, and she is determined to make it her best year yet. Her plans are put on hold, however, when she meets Hiro Sakurai. Hiro is the new boy in school and everyone wants to get to know him. His good looks and mysterious demeanour instantly gets Miki interested and she tries everything in her power to be friends with him, but Hiro turns everyone off. He claims he likes being alone, and he always will be alone. This only whets Miki's appetite, and she spends almost all of her free time following Hiro and taking notes in her mind and thinking about him and smiling at him. It turns out that he is a Deliverer- a quasi-celestial being brought to the earth to try to preserve love, which is slowly dying out. Miki and Hiro will find that their relationship will get them in difficult situations on more than one occasion. Each book is written during a different season, spanning over one year.

== Influences ==
Inspired by nature, Crilley went out into the Japanese countryside to make sketches of the landscape and shrines, which he incorporated into the artwork. In fact, Crilley noted in one of his YouTube videos that he wanted every page to be filled with detail. Many of the locations in the series are based on actual sights in Fukuyama, Japan.

== Film adaptation ==
In 2008, Variety reported that Paramount Pictures and Brad Pitt’s Plan B had acquired the rights to adapt the four-volume OEL manga into a movie with Sera Gamble, a producer and writer for “Supernatural”, attached to the project as the scriptwriter.

== Characters in the group ==
Miki Yoshida - Miki is the female protagonist of the series. She's a 17-year-old girl who plans on being herself during her senior year instead of trying to be perfect. Although kind and caring, she can be stubborn, which leads to her pursuit in Hiro. Hiro's sometimes afraid to let her on his delivery missions because she could intervene, like she did with her friend Yumi. She and Reika are somewhat rivals for Hiro's affection. Miki's very strong-willed and will go to any lengths to help her friends, although this sometimes leads to rather poor results. She's seemingly in the pursuit of finer things in life, which often makes her the laughing stock of her friends. At the end of the series she becomes a Deliverer herself, thus ending her friendship with Yumi while ensuring her more time with Hiro.

Hiro Sakurai - Hiro is the male protagonist of the series. He's the new kid at school who's usually alone because he pushes people away, but Miki wants to change that. He begins to slowly open up to Miki and eventually reveals his secret. He belongs to a secret group of supernatural beings called "Deliverers", whose main goal is to preserve love by observing and taking notes on couples. He tries his best to stray from love, but eventually gives in to his love for Miki, thus breaking the sacred oath he took as a Deliverer, which puts both him and Miki in danger. Hiro initially seems cold, but is really a very kind and caring soul, although he has trouble expressing his kindness. It's very common to see him with a stern look on his face.

Reika - Reika is the main antagonist of the story. She's a Deliverer like Hiro and takes her job seemingly less seriously. She has a crush on Hiro and becomes jealous of Miki because Hiro doesn't return his feelings for her. She threatens to report Hiro to their superiors if he and Miki continue their affair. She's selfish, vain, and cares only to have Hiro for herself through any means. She threatens Miki on several occasions and is an enemy to both her and Hiro.

Anra - Anra is Hiro's hold spirit. She's a being that's able to take the shape of any animal. She helps Hiro on his missions to alter interactions between individuals and helps gather information. She's completely loyal to Hiro and tells him everything, though once, in book three, she threatened that she would never come back to him if he betrayed her again and left her.

Yumi - Yumi is Miki's best friend. She's typically boy-obsessed and cares a little too much about Miki's dating life. She thinks Hiro's a jerk and that Miki's wasting her time on him. She had a boyfriend named Kazu who later broke up with her for her friend. She at first believed the friend was Miki and disowned her as a friend until she learned the truth. She later gains another boyfriend named Yoshi, who Miki believes is a sleazeball.
