= Wilson Tortosa =

Filipino comic book artist

Wilson "Wunan" Tortosa is a Filipino comic book artist best known for his works on Tomb Raider and the American re-launch of Battle of The Planets for Top Cow Productions. Wilson studied in the Philippine Cultural College (formerly Philippine Cultural High School) and graduated in the University of Santo Tomas in 2000 with a bachelor's degree in Fine Arts, majoring in advertising.

== Bibliography ==
- Exposure: Second Coming, a 13-page backup story (Avatar Press)
- Jade #2-4, four issue miniseries (Chaos! Comics)
- Jade: Redemption #1-4, four issue miniseries (Chaos! Comics)
- Co-artist for Banzai Girl #1-4 (Sirius Entertainment)
- Battle of the Planets #1-12 maxiseries (Top Cow Productions)
- Tomb Raider #38-39, #41-44 (Top Cow Productions)
- Battle of the Planets: Princess #1-6 (Top Cow Productions)
- City of Heroes #4-6 (Top Cow Productions)
- Shadowcast #1-5 (Harcourt Achieve)
- LEGO Exo-Force webcomic
- Echobase (Jan Kjaer, Glydendal)
- Wolverine: Prodigal Son Vol. 1 (Del Rey)
- Bring The Thunder #1-4 (Dynamite Publishing)
