= Radio Television Artesia =

- Country: United States
- Broadcast area: Artesia
- Headquarters: Artesia

Programming
- Language: Portuguese
- Picture format: 1080i (SDTV)

History
- Launched: 1991

Radio Television Artesia is a Portuguese-language public access television channel in Artesia, California, located in the Los Angeles metropolitan area, broadcasting on channel 36 on cable.

== History ==
The station began as a pilot service in 1990 by David Martins and Joe Silva, named Portuguese Broadcasting Network and airing on ethnic independent station KSCI. In 1991, the two members moved to Artesia and created the current RTA. The station was carried on Insight Cable Vision. Osvaldo Palhinha, a Portuguese immigrant who arrived to Artesia in the early 1970s alongside his wife Aurélia, was responsible for the station for a long time (from 1993 to 2004), and also produced Califórnia Contacto for RTP Internacional in the 2000s and 2010s. Aurélia chose the name RTA. Between 1993, António Diniz Coelho was the station's treasurer.

By 2016, RTA was presided by Manuel Aguiar. It is still the only television station to broadcast locally in Portuguese to Southern California.
