= Fillbach Brothers =

Matt and Shawn Fillbach
- Areas: Writer, Penciller, Inker, Letterer
- Notable works: Star Wars: Clone Wars Adventures

The Fillbach Brothers (Matt Fillbach and Shawn Fillbach) are comic book artists, known for penciling the Dark Horse Comics Star Wars: Clone Wars Adventures series.

== Career ==
Matt Fillbach and Shawn Fillbach started out by producing creator-owned projects such as Captain Freebird (Broken Heroes) and, after their run on Clone Wars Adventures, Maxwell Strangewell and Roadkill: A Jim Kowalksi Adventure. They have also contributed three volumes to a Clone Wars series of graphic novellas from Dark Horse.

Additionally, the Fillbach Brothers did an anthology webcomic, Roninspoon Theater, that was updated weekly.

The Fillbach Brothers are currently co-writing with Dave Land and handling the art chores for the monthly title Werewolves on the Moon: Versus Vampires? from Dark Horse Comics.

== Bibliography ==
- Captain Freebird (Broken Heroes), Sirius Entertainment, 1998, ISBN 1-57989-029-6
- "Smuggler's Blues" in Star Wars Tales #14, Dark Horse Comics, 1999
- Star Wars: Clone Wars Adventures, Dark Horse Comics, 2004–2008
- Maxwell Strangewell, Dark Horse Comics, 2007, ISBN 1-59307-794-7
- Roadkill: A Jim Kowalksi Adventure, Dark Horse Comics, 2008, ISBN 1-59582-169-4
- Star Wars: The Clone Wars - Shipyards of Doom, Dark Horse Comics] ISBN 1-59582-207-0
- Star Wars: The Clone Wars - The Colossus of Destiny, Dark Horse Comics, 2009, ISBN 1-59582-416-2
- Star Wars: The Clone Wars - Crash Course, Dark Horse Comics, 2009, ISBN 1-59582-230-5
- Werewolves on the Moon: Versus Vampires?, Dark Horse Comics, 2009
