= Archaia Entertainment =

Imprint of American publisher Boom! Studios

Archaia Entertainment, LLC
- Founded: 2002
- Founder: Mark Smylie
- Country of origin: United States
- Headquarters location: Hollywood, California
- Key people: P.J. Bickett - CEO 2008–2013; Aki Liao - co-publisher 2002–2008; Stephen Christy - editor-in-chief 2010–2013; Mike Kennedy - publisher 2011–2013
- Publication types: Comic books Graphic novels

Archaia Entertainment, LLC, commonly known as Archaia (formerly known as Archaia Studios Press), is an imprint of American comic book and graphic novel publisher Boom! Studios.

Archaia Entertainment, LLC was originally an American comic book publishing company established by Mark Smylie in 2002. On June 24, 2013, it was acquired by Boom! Studios and became a wholly owned imprint.

As of 2017, 20th Century Fox purchased a minority stake in Boom! Studios, valued at $10 million. In 2019, The Walt Disney Company inherited Fox's stake in Boom! Studios after Disney acquired 21st Century Fox's assets on March 20, 2019.

As of September 10, 2024, Disney had sold Boom! Studios to Random House.

== History ==
Mark Smylie formed the company as a home for his comic book series Artesia. The original Artesia publisher, Sirius Entertainment, published the first six-issue mini-series, Artesia, in 1999, and the second six-issue mini-series, Artesia Afield, in 2000, in full color. In an attempt to keep costs down, Sirius wanted to print the third series, Artesia Afire, in black and white. Smylie decided to take the series back from the publisher and open his own publishing outfit to finance the full-color publication of the third series.

In April 2006, the company announced they would be expanding their publishing to encompass projects from third parties that were not created by original founder Mark Smylie. "It wasn't long – out of equal parts necessity and entrepreneurialism – before the New Jersey–based painter realized that simply putting out his own work, regardless of how critically acclaimed it was, simply wouldn't be enough, and, along with business partner Aki Liao, began actively searching for both new and existing material to publish under the Archaia banner."

In May 2008, Smylie announced they would be restructuring the company in order to address late-shipping books following the departure of Archaia's co-publisher Aki Liao. "We want to make sure we come out of the reorganization with a better workflow and solicitation process model," Smylie said. "We also want to make sure we emerge in the next few months from our reorganization with a release schedule that we can hit on a regular basis, as guaranteed as possible".

Archaia was bought by Kunoichi in October 2008, who relaunched the company in June 2009 as simply Archaia. Smylie was installed as Publisher while Stephen Christy was brought aboard as director of development. Kunoichi principal P.J. Bickett took over as CEO. In April 2010, Christy was named the company's editor-in-chief.

In 2013, Archaia was acquired by Boom! Studios and converted from a stand-alone company into an imprint at the publisher.

The Walt Disney Company inherited Fox's minority stake in Boom! Studios, after Disney acquired 21st Century Fox's assets on March 20, 2019.

== Film adaptations ==
In March of 2012, Warner Bros. announced that it had picked up Sean Rubin's upcoming graphic novel Bolivar for an intended animated feature film. Irish filmmaker Kealan O’Rourke was attached to write and direct the project. Akiva Goldsman and Kerry Foster were set to produce the film through their Weed Road company.

The graphic novel Rust was also picked up by 20th Century Fox. It had Aline Brosh McKenna attached to write and Simon Kinberg to produce.
