= Artesia (comics) =

Comic book series

Artesia is an epic fantasy comic book series authored and illustrated by American artist Mark Smylie. Artesia is also the name of the heroine of the series, described by the Smylie as a "Pagan Joan of Arc," while noting that the closest historical model is the Irish Queen Medb. The series includes themes such as feudal politics, intrigue, power struggles, complex mythology, and world history, with strong female characters.

The series is currently composed of four "books": Artesia, Artesia Afield, Artesia Afire, and Artesia Besieged. Each book is composed of six episodes, or standard American comic book sized episodes. Each book has been followed by an annual compendium including short stories and details of the history, geography, and mythology of Artesia's universe. The books together constitute part of a cycle called The Book of Dooms. Noting that it would take 22 books to tell Artesia's story in full, the author has committed to at least 7 for completion.

Artesia's first two books were published by Sirius Entertainment. Later being published by Archaia Studios Press, founded by Smylie.

In 2005, a role-playing game was released, set in the world of Artesia. It uses the Fuzion role-playing system, and is called Artesia: Adventures in the Known World.

== Artesia ==
Artesia is described as tall and beautiful. She is highly intelligent and promiscuous. It is strongly hinted throughout the series that Artesia is (as well as most female characters) bisexual. She has a keen understanding of war and strategy. She possesses an enchanted sword of an unknown magic type to inflict wounds on creatures which cannot otherwise be hurt by conventional weapons. It contains five magical runes; the smith Hymachus believes it to be 800 to 1,000 years old and possibly made by the legendary armorer Brage.

Artesia was born in the Middle Kingdoms to Byron and Argante, the witch of An-Athair. Her mother began teaching her the tenets of witchcraft at an early age. Artesia was raised in the predominant religion of the Middle Kingdoms, the worship of Islik and his father, Helios, the Sun King. She also had two younger brothers, Stjepan and Justin.

As a young girl playing in the forest, Artesia found the body of a female warrior who had been killed by bandits, but who had slain all of her attackers. She took the dead warrior's sword, which was an enchanted blade, and practiced with it secretly, desiring to be a warrior like its previous owner.

Ultimately, her mother was discovered and burned as a witch by the Witch-Hunters of the Knights of Saint Agall, a military order. Her father was unable or unwilling to intervene and she fled to the Highlands of Daradja, near the ancient citadel of Dara Dess. There, she became the concubine of King Branimir (Bran the Wolf) and learned to use sex as a tool. She also converted to the Highland religion, worshiping the Goddess Yhera, becoming a priestess. Acting on her desire to be a warrior, she seduced Ulin, King Bran's commander, into training her as a soldier and a commander. She thus succeeded in becoming one of Bran's most capable war-captains. King Bran had six other concubines that Artesia refers to as her sisters.

As time passed, King Bran became alarmed at Artesia's growing confidence and popularity, especially as the Highland tribes were a somewhat matriarchal society and Dara Dess had long been ruled by a line of female warrior-queens. Bran decided that Artesia had to be killed to safeguard his throne. He sent her company out to fight a neighboring king, King Alexus, in the hopes that his champion would kill her. Simultaneously, he invited the Knights of St Agall to assist him in disposing of her as a back-up plan, which was needed when she survived the battle against Alexus’ champion. This was Bran's fatal mistake.

By inviting the Knights of St Agall into the Highlands, he agreed to convert to their worship of Helios and Islik, an act that cost him the support of many of his followers, devout adherents of Yhera. Additionally, Artesia was aware of the plot through her witchcraft and was able to kill the two assassins sent to dispatch her. While some of her company remained loyal to Bran, she raised the standard of revolt and was joined by the Highland tribesmen, allowing her to defeat the combined forces of King Bran and the Knights, pushing them back into the Citadel of Dara Dess and besieging them.

When one of her brothers, Stjepan, arrived with word that the Thessid Empire had invaded the Middle Kingdoms, Artesia attempted to negotiate with Bran, but was rebuffed, causing most of his remaining forces to desert. It was also discovered via Artesia's magic that Bran's men had murdered his concubines. She was able to gather the spirits of several of them and bind them to hers to prevent them from being devoured by otherworldly creatures. Supported by the other Highland Kings, her army then stormed the citadel, killing Ulin before Bran was betrayed by his guards, allowing Artesia to mystically bind his spirit to this world before beheading him. His head remains on a spear in the throne room of Dara Dess, there he will see everything and one day, report on what he has observed before his spirit will be released.

Artesia's position as both a witch and a priestess of Yhera gives her magical abilities that allow her to see visions and cross dimensional planes, see through the eyes of a crow and bind the souls of her sister-concubines to her. She can enter rooms magically and eavesdrop on the conversations held therein. She is attended in battle by three she-demons (Mormo, Dimidce and Charize) who assist her at critical moments, and she can summon spirit-guides to escort the dead to the after-life. She can also prevent the dead from entering the after-life if she so chooses. Her magic is shown to be strong enough to break the magic of the Thessid sorcerers in several instances.

In the immediate aftermath of her victory over Bran, Artesia does not claim the title of Queen of Dara Dess in spite of her captains insisting that she do so. Ultimately, she agrees to accept the crown as it increases her status in the Middle Kingdoms and helps her in her dealings with her allies to counter the Thessid invasion. She leads the Highland army, bolstered with contingents from the other Highland Kings, into the Middle Kingdoms to fight the Thessids.

== Artesia's lieutenants ==
- Ferris is a short haired female warrior. She is also a Cult Sister of the Cult of Hathhalla, a subset of the worship of Yhera. A dour individual as befits a follower of Hathhalla.
- Umaza: Another one of Artesia's female warriors, Umaza wears her hair in braids. She and Demetrius were noted by King Alexus as being excellent soldiers. She is familiar with Artesia and unafraid to chide her for being promiscuous.
- Demetrius - A male warrior, Demetrius was recognized by King Alexus (along with Umaza) as a good soldier to employ. He and Vaslov once killed a Wyrm and its scales are used in their armor.
- Pavel, Artesia's cavalry commander. She frequently trusts him with independent missions. When he arrived to join her rebellion, she caressed his cheek, as he is one of her lovers. When Beric, Lord Hus, brags to others about sleeping with Artesia, Pavel is offended and intends to discuss the matter with him.
- Yerwin - The Chief of Scouts, Yerwin wears no steel armor, only a brown leather jerkin and has a grey goatee. Artesia refers to him as Hawkeye.
- Hymachus - A blacksmith and armorer, his skill is highly regarded by everyone. He adapts Bran's Wyrm Scale armor into a suit of armor for Artesia, infusing it with his own arsenal magic.
- Bela and Borna - Twin brothers who are also master trackers. They each captured one of the towers of the Citadel of Dara Dess when it was stormed.
- Moromir - A steady old soldier, Moromir has a sense of gallows humor. Artesia teases him about his drinking, but it is unclear whether he is a drinker or a teetotaler. He is completely bald.
- Uros - A member of King Bran's guard, he, along with all the others, switched sides and became Artesia's bodyguard. He is bound by oath and magic to protect her but is not trusted by Sava. Sava accuses him of being a rapist and murderer for participating in the murders of King Bran's concubines, a charge he does not deny. Sava has promised to kill him should he outlive Artesia. He is considered the most dangerous swordsman in the Daradjan Highlands.
- Sav, who acts as Artesia's chamberlain in spite of the fact that she is an excellent swordsman. She commanded the camp and lost her left arm at the battle of Collwyn. She hates Uros and has sworn to kill him for his complicity in the murder of King Bran's concubines. She is also training the girl Erce to be a page for Artesia.
- Daemander. He is the captain of a unit of Palatian mercenaries hired by Artesia. He is assisted by three other officers, Samaia, Irgrath (both females), and Tyrius. The Palatian mercenaries are very skilled fighters, but their true motives are unknown.
- Dahlia – Dahlia is described as a camp follower and a courtesan. In actuality, she is Artesia's spy in the camp of the Palatian mercenaries. Unbeknown to them, she speaks the Palatian language and beds their officers to ascertain their true motive. Thus far, she has been unsuccessful.
- Hueyln. Wounded in the battle with King Alexus, Artesia trusts him enough to leave him in Dara Dess as her regent while she is on campaign.
- Dymas and Constans, two of Artesia's lieutenants who refused to join her revolt against Bran. She was disappointed at Dymas’ refusal. Dymas was mortally wounded in battle and was found afterward by Artesia, who spared his spirit from being taken by demons on the Night of the Wild Hunt. Constans abandoned King Bran at Dara Dess and fled.

== Others ==
- The Highland Kings – There are four great citadels in the Daradjan Highlands, each held by a King. Artesia is the Queen of Dara Dess, the largest of the four. The other three are:
  - Gavagh of Heth Moll – The oldest of the Citadel Kings, Gavagh wears a mask over his face. The troops he sends to reinforce the Highland army are considered first rate fighters.
  - Alexus of Finleth - Cousin of King Bran, he sympathizes with Artesia when Bran betrays her. In spite of the death of his champion, he offers Artesia and her company a place in his household.
  - Renham of An-Athark – For reasons not yet revealed, King Renham aided Bran in his conspiracy against Artesia by secretly allowing the Knights of St Agall into the Highlands. His Wizard Mutoric, enchanted the blade used by the Agallite widow when she tried to assassinate Artesia. Becir is his bannerman who rides with the Highland army under Artesia's command.
- Becir, Lord Hus, commands the troops from An-Athark who ride with the Highland army. He and the two other commanders engaged in a sexual encounter with Artesia, after which, Becir was overheard by Pavel bragging about it in crude terms. Becir's second in command, Mirsed, has implied that he would kill Becir if given the chance.
- King Caslav – King of Umat, also known as the Silver King, Caslav commands the wing of the Middle Kingdom army that Artesia's Highlanders are attached to. They become lovers, but he is a jealous man and rejects her when he realizes she is not solely his.
- Owen Lis Red – Grand Duke of Har Misal and Marshal of the northernmost Middle Kingdom army. He is wounded at the battle of Collwyn. His wife, the lady Ilyana, had a vision that Artesia would save her husband and he would follow her to his death and that Artesia would kill her, and she would thank her for it. The Grand Duke and his wife have two legitimate sons. He also has a large number of illegitimate children.
- Miklos – One of the three Highland commanders who march with Artesia's army. Another of Artesia's lovers, he becomes friends with Grand Duke Owen's sons.

== Notes ==
1. Mark Smylie, Letters Page, Artesia Annual #2 (2001)
