= Meet Me There =

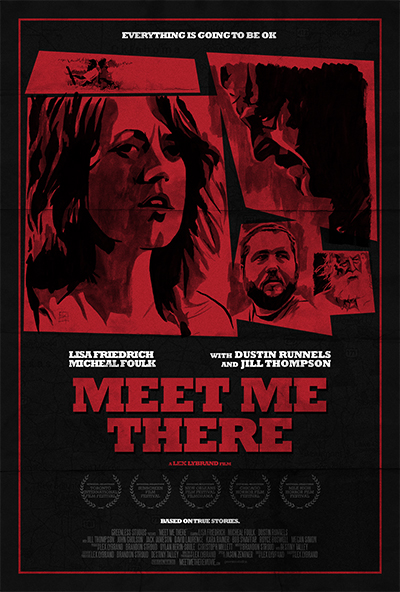
- Theatrical release poster
- Directed by: Lex Lybrand
- Written by: Brandon Stroud; Destiny Talley
- Produced by: Dylan Herin-Soule; Lex Lybrand; Christoph J. Millett; Brandon Stroud; Destiny Talley
- Production company: Greenless Studios
- Release date: April 4, 2014
- Running time: 93 minutes
- Country: United States
- Language: English

Meet Me There is a 2014 American horror film directed by Lex Lybrand. The movie, written by Brandon Stroud and Destiny Talley, is based on true stories from Talley's childhood. It premiered on April 4, 2014 as part of the New Orleans Film Society's Film-O-Rama festival. Since then, the film has played in numerous film festivals across the U.S., including the Sunscreen Film Festival, Sioux Falls Indievents, Innovative Film Festival, Beta Film Festival, and Wizard World Chicago's inaugural Bruce Campbell Horror Film Festival.

== Synopsis ==
Suspecting that her disturbing, fragmented memories of her childhood are responsible for their intimacy issues, Ada brings her boyfriend Calvin back to her hometown in rural Oklahoma. Hoping that facing these nightmares will help her overcome them, what they find is a town with a dark, mysterious history, and discover that some memories might be better left forgotten.

== Cast ==
- Lisa Friedrich as Ada
- Micheal Foulk as Calvin
- Dustin Runnels as Preacher Woodward
- Jill Thompson as Lindsay
- Megan Simon as Marlow
- David Laurence as Davis

== Production ==
Shooting took place in Austin, Texas during the summer of 2013. The project originally began as a generic slasher project for writers Stroud and Talley, but soon evolved into something bigger, with Stroud saying, "About halfway through it I realized that I could do something real with this and touch some feelings, thoughts and themes, so I went in a completely different direction than when I started." The film utilized crowd-funding site Indiegogo to raise more than $6,000 of its budget.

== Reception ==
Critical reviews for the film have been largely positive. Dave Wain of UK Horror Scene gave the film 8 out of 10, describing it as "a treat for anyone that has any kind of affection for good, honest independent horror" and saying it should be viewed as "a template for what independent horror filmmakers should seek to create". The Deadhouse also praised the film, notably the acting of Friedrich and Foulk, saying that they are "completely and utterly convincing in how they react to things".
