= Mark Smylie =

Comic creator

- Born: 1967 (age 58–59) Florida, U.S.
- Area: Illustration

Mark Smylie is an American comics creator, writer and illustrator. He is best known for his Artesia epic fantasy comic series.

== Biography ==
Born in Florida in 1967, he studied political science, philosophy, art history, and English literature at Columbia University for four years. Besides Artesia, Smylie has also done numerous illustrations for role-playing games and other media. He has done interior illustrations for Dungeons & Dragons manuals, including Faiths and Pantheons, Epic Level Handbook, and Complete Warrior. After first working with Sirius Entertainment, he founded Archaia Studios Press in 2002 to publish Artesia and eventually comics from other creators. The setting of Smylie's novel The Barrow is the same as his Artesia series.

Smylie was nominated for the 2006 Russ Manning award for most promising newcomer, and his Artesia series was nominated for several comics awards.
