= List of Harvey Award winners =

The following is a list of winners of the Harvey Award, sorted by category.

In 2017, the Harvey Awards decided to skip the 2017 awards ceremony and to reboot the ceremony for 2018 in order to give fewer awards by focusing on works instead of individuals.

== Current awards ==
=== Main awards ===
==== Book of the Year Award ====
Book of the Year Award winners, 2018–present
Year	Author	Title	Publisher	Ref.
2018	Marjorie Liu and Sana Takeda	Monstress	Image Comics	
2019	Jarrett J. Krosoczka	Hey Kiddo	Scholastic Graphix	
2020	Gene Luen Yang	Dragon Hoops	First Second Books	
2021	Trung Le Nguyen	The Magic Fish	Random House	
2022	Pornsak Pichetshote and Alexandre Tefenkgi	The Good Asian, Vol. 1	Image Comics	
2023	Kate Beaton	Ducks: Two Years in the Oil Sands	Drawn & Quarterly	
2024	Jillian Tamaki and Mariko Tamaki	Roaming	Drawn & Quarterly	
2025	Patrick Horvath	Beneath the Trees Where Nobody Sees	IDW Publishing	

==== Digital Book of the Year Award ====
Digital Book of the Year Award winners, 2018–present
Year	Author	Title	Publisher	Ref.
2018	Brian K. Vaughan, Marcos Martin, and Muntsa Vicente	Barrier	Panel Syndicate	
2019	Ngozi Ukazu	Check, Please!		
2020	Matt Bors (ed.)	The Nib	thenib.com	
2021	Rachel Smythe	Lore Olympus		
2022	Rachel Smythe	Lore Olympus		
2023	Rachel Smythe	Lore Olympus		
2024	Ed Brubaker and Marcos Martin	Friday	Panel Syndicate	
2025	Sarah Andersen	Sarah's Scribbles	Simon & Schuster	

==== Best Children's or Young Adult Book Award ====
Best Children's or Young Adult Book Award winners, 2018–present
Year	Author	Title	Publisher	Ref.
2018	Jen Wang	The Prince and the Dressmaker	First Second Books	
2018	Katie O'Neill	The Tea Dragon Society	Oni Press	
2019	Mariko Tamaki and Rosemary Valero-O'Connell	Laura Dean Keeps Breaking Up with Me	First Second Books	
2020	Gene Luen Yang and Gurihiru	Superman Smashes the Klan	DC Comics	
2021	Trung Le Nguyen	The Magic Fish	Random House	
2022	Nadia Shammas and Sara Alfageeh	Squire	HarperAlley	
2023	Victoria Ying	Hungry Ghost	First Second Books	
2024	Children: Pedro Martin	Mexikid	Dial	
2024	Young Adult: Jillian Tamaki and Mariko Tamaki	Roaming	Drawn & Quarterly	
2025	Children: Raina Telgemeier and Scott McCloud	The Cartoonists Club	Scholastic Corporation	
2025	Young Adult: Briana Loewinsohn	Raised by Ghosts	Fantagraphics	

==== Best Adaptation From a Comic ====
Best Adaptation From a Comic winners, 2018–present
Year	Title	Publisher	Adapted from	Publisher	Ref.
2018	Black Panther	Marvel Studios	Black Panther	Marvel Comics	
2019	Spider-Man: Into the Spider-Verse	Columbia Pictures and Sony Pictures Animation	Spider-Man	Marvel Comics	
2020	Watchmen	HBO	Watchmen	DC Comics	
2021	WandaVision	Disney+	The Avengers	Marvel Comics	
2022	Ms. Marvel	Disney+	Ms. Marvel	Marvel Comics	
2023	Spider-Man: Across the Spider-Verse	Columbia Pictures and Sony Pictures Animation	Spider-Man	Marvel Comics	
2024	X-Men '97	Marvel Studios Animation and Disney+	X-Men	Marvel Comics	
2025	Superman	DC Studios and Warner Bros.	Superman	DC Comics	

==== Best Manga Title Award ====
Best Manga Title Award winners, 2018–present
Year	Author	Title	Publisher	Ref.
2018	Nagata Kabi	My Lesbian Experience With Loneliness	Seven Seas	
2019	Kohei Horikoshi	My Hero Academia	Viz Media	
2020	Kamome Shirahama	Witch Hat Atelier	Kodansha Comics	
2021	Tatsuki Fujimoto with Amanda Haley (trans.)	Chainsaw Man	Viz Media	
2022	Tatsuki Fujimoto with Amanda Haley (trans.)	Chainsaw Man	Viz Media	
2023	Tatsuki Fujimoto with Amanda Haley (trans.)	Chainsaw Man	Viz Media	
2024	Ryoko Kui	Delicious in Dungeon	Yen Press	
2025	Kamome Shirahama	Witch Hat Atelier	Kodansha Comics	

==== Best International Book Award ====
Best International Book Award winners, 2020–present
Year	Author	Title	Publisher
2020	Keum Suk Gendry-Kim with Janet Hong (trans.)	Grass	Drawn & Quarterly
2021	Yeong-shin Ma with Janet Hong (trans.)	Moms	Drawn & Quarterly
2022	Mirka Andolfo	Sweet Paprika	Image Comics
2023	Juan Díaz Canales and Juanjo Guarnido with Diana Schutz and Brandon Kander (trans.)	Blacksad: They All Fall Down Part 1	Dark Horse Books
2024	Juan Diaz Canales and Juanjo Guarnido	Blacksad Vol. 7	Europe Comics
2025	Juan Díaz Canales and Juanjo Guarnido with Diana Schutz and Brandon Kander (trans.)	Blacksad: They All Fall Down Part 2	Dark Horse Books

=== Special awards ===
==== Harvey Awards Hall of Fame ====
Harvey Awards Hall of Fame inductees, 2017–present
Year	Author	Ref.
2017	Darwyn Cooke	
2018	Roz Chast	
2018	Dave Gibbons	
2019	Alison Bechdel	
2019	Jack Davis	
2019	Will Elder	
2019	Mike Mignola	
2019	Ben Oda	
2019	John Severin	
2019	Marie Severin	
2020	Osamu Tezuka	
2020	Jill Thompson	
2020	Milestone Media founders: Denys Cowan, Derek T. Dingle, Michael Davis, and Dwayne McDuffie	
2021	Bernie Wrightson	
2021	Michael Kaluta	
2021	Barry Windsor-Smith	
2021	Rumiko Takahashi	
2021	Jeffrey Catherine Jones	
2022	Neil Gaiman	
2022	Roy Thomas	
2023	Chris Claremont	
2023	Walt Simonson	
2023	Louise Simonson	
2023	Marv Wolfman	
2023	George Pérez	
2023	Bill Griffith	
2024	Akira Toriyama	
2024	Sergio Aragones	
2024	Larry Hama	
2024	John Buscema	
2024	Arthur Adams	
2025
2025	Wendy Pini and Richard Pini	
2025	Patrick McDonnell	
2025	John Byrne	
2025	Peter David	
2025	Barbara Shermund	

== Previous awards ==
=== Works ===
==== Best New Series ====
Best New Series winners, 1988–2016
Year	Author	Title	Publisher
1988	Paul Chadwick	Concrete	Dark Horse Comics
1989	James Vance and Dan Burr	Kings in Disguise	Kitchen Sink Press
1990	Dan Clowes	Eightball	Fantagraphics
1991	Peter Bagge	Hate	Fantagraphics
1992	Dave McKean, assisted by Clare Haythornthwaite	Cages	Tundra
1993	Michael Dalton Allred	Madman	Tundra
1994	Bernie Wrightson and Shephard Hendrix, edited by Phil Amara	Captain Sternn	Tundra/Kitchen Sink Press
1995	Chris Ware, edited by Kim Thompson	Acme Novelty Library	Fantagraphics
1996	Kurt Busiek and Brent Anderson	Kurt Busiek's Astro City	Image Comics
1997	James Robinson and Paul Smith, edited by Jonathan Peterson	Leave It to Chance	Image Comics
1998	Jaime Hernández, edited by Gary Groth	Penny Century	Fantagraphics
1999	Katie Garnier (ed.)	The Spirit: New Adventures	
2000	Dave Cooper, edited by Gary Groth	Weasel	Fantagraphics
2001	Gilbert Hernandez, edited by Gary Groth	Luba's Comix and Stories	Fantagraphics
2002	Jessica Abel	La Perdida	Fantagraphics
2003	Nick Bertozzi	Rubbernecker	Alternative Comics
2004	Kyle Baker	Plastic Man	DC Comics
2005		Michael Chabon Presents: The Amazing Adventures of the Escapist	Dark Horse Comics
2006		Young Avengers	Marvel Comics
2007		Will Eisner's The Spirit	DC Comics
2008	Gerard Way	The Umbrella Academy	Dark Horse Comics
2009		Echo	Abstract Studio
2010		Chew	Image Comics
2011	Scott Snyder, Stephen King, and Rafael Albuquerque	American Vampire	Vertigo Comics/DC Comics
2012	Mark Waid and Paolo Rivera	Daredevil	Marvel Comics
2013	Brian K. Vaughan and Fiona Staples	Saga	Image Comics
2014	Matt Fraction and Chip Zdarsky	Sex Criminals	Image Comics
2015		Southern Bastards	Image Comics
2016		Paper Girls	Image Comics

==== Best Continuing or Limited Series ====
Best Continuing or Limited Series winner, 1988–2016
Year	Author	Title	Publisher
1988	Alan Moore and Dave Gibbons	Watchmen	DC Comics
1989	Jaime Hernández and Gilbert Hernandez	Love and Rockets	Fantagraphics
1990	Jaime Hernández and Gilbert Hernandez	Love and Rockets	Fantagraphics
1991	Dan Clowes	Eightball	Fantagraphics
1992	Dan Clowes, edited by Gary Groth	Eightball	Fantagraphics
1993	Neil Gaiman et al., edited by Karen Berger	The Sandman	DC Comics
1994	Kurt Busiek and Alex Ross, edited by Marcus McLaurin	Marvels	Marvel Comics
1995	Alan Moore and Eddie Campbell, edited by Phil Amara	From Hell	Kitchen Sink Press
1996	Frank Miller	Sin City	Dark Horse Comics
1997	Dan Clowes, edited by Gary Groth	Eightball	Fantagraphics
1998	Kurt Busiek and Brent Anderson	Kurt Busiek's Astro City	Image/Homage
1999	Frank Miller and Lynn Varley	300	Dark Horse Comics
2000	Chris Ware, edited by Kim Thompson	Acme Novelty Library	Fantagraphics
2001	Chris Ware, edited by Kim Thompson	Acme Novelty Library	Fantagraphics
2002		100 Bullets	DC Comics
2003	Alan Moore and Kevin O'Neill	The League of Extraordinary Gentlemen	ABC
2004	Alan Moore and Kevin O'Neill	The League of Extraordinary Gentlemen	ABC/WildStorm/DC Comics
2005	Darwyn Cooke	DC: The New Frontier	
2006	Brian K. Vaughan	Runaways	Marvel Comics
2007	Ed Brubaker and Michael Lark	Daredevil	Marvel Comics
2008		All-Star Superman	DC Comics
2009		All-Star Superman	DC Comics
2010		The Walking Dead	Image Comics
2011	Jaime Hernández and Gilbert Hernandez	Love and Rockets	Fantagraphics
2012	Mark Waid and Paolo Rivera	Daredevil	Marvel Comics
2013	Brian K. Vaughan and Fiona Staples	Saga	Image Comics
2014	Brian K. Vaughan and Fiona Staples	Saga	Image Comics
2015	Brian K. Vaughan and Fiona Staples	Saga	Image Comics
2016	Brian K. Vaughan and Fiona Staples	Saga	Image Comics

==== Best Original Graphic Publication For Younger Readers ====
Best Original Graphic Publication For Younger Readers winners, 2010–2016
Year	Author	Title	Publisher
2010		The Muppet Show Comic Book	BOOM! Studios
2011	Art Baltazar and Franco Aureliani	Tiny Titans	DC Comics
2012	Vera Brosgol	Anya's Ghost	First Second Books
2013	Ryan North	Adventure Time	KaBOOM! Studios
2014	Ryan North	Adventure Time	KaBOOM! Studios
2015	Shannon Watters, Grace Ellis, and ND Stevenson	Lumberjanes	BOOM! Studios
2016	Shannon Watters, Grace Ellis, and ND Stevenson	Lumberjanes	BOOM! Studios

==== Best Single Issue or Story ====
Best Single Issue or Story winners, 1988–2016
Year	Author	Title	Publisher
1988	Alan Moore and Dave Gibbons	Watchmen #9	DC Comics
1989	Alan Moore, Brian Bolland, and John Higgins	Batman: The Killing Joke	DC Comics
1990	Dan Clowes	Eightball #1	Fantagraphics
1991	Dan Clowes	Eightball #3	Fantagraphics
1992	Mark Schultz and Steve Stiles, edited by Dave Schreiner	Xenozoic Tales #11	Kitchen Sink Press
1993	Jim Woodring and Mark Martin	Tantalizing Stories Presents Frank In The River	Tundra
1994	Paul Dini and Bruce W. Timm, edited by Scott Peterson	Batman: Mad Love	DC Comics
1995	Kurt Busiek and Alex Ross, edited by Marcus McLaurin	Marvels #4	Marvel Comics
1996	Kurt Busiek and Brent Anderson	Astro City #1	Image
1997	Chris Ware, edited by Kim Thompson	Acme Novelty Library #7	Fantagraphics
1998	Dan Clowes, edited by Gary Groth	Eightball #18	Fantagraphics
1999	Jaime Hernández	Penny Century #3: Home School	Fantagraphics
2000	Chris Ware	Acme Novelty Library #13	Fantagraphics
2001	Evan Dorkin et al.	Superman and Batman: World's Funnest	DC Comics
2002		Eightball #22	Fantagraphics
2003	Alan Moore and Kevin O'Neill	The League of Extraordinary Gentlemen, Vol. II #1	ABC
2004		Gotham Central #6-10	DC Comics
2004	Gilbert Hernandez and Jaime Hernandez	Love and Rockets #9	Fantagraphics
2005	Daniel Clowes	Eightball #23	Fantagraphics
2006	Gilbert Hernandez and Jaime Hernandez	Love and Rockets, vol. 2, #15	Fantagraphics
2007	Mark Millar and Steve McNiven	Civil War #1	Marvel Comics
2008		All-Star Superman #8	DC Comics
2009	Brian K. Vaughan and Pia Guerra	Y: The Last Man #60	Vertigo/DC Comics
2010	David Mazzucchelli	Asterios Polyp	Pantheon
2011	Fábio Moon and Gabriel Bá	Daytripper	Vertigo/DC Comics
2012	Ramón Pérez	Jim Henson's Tale of Sand	Archaia Entertainment
2013	Brian K. Vaughan and Fiona Staples	Saga #1	Image Comics
2014	Matt Fraction and David Aja	Pizza Is My Business, Hawkeye #11	Marvel Comics
2015		Breaking Out in Dark Horse Presents #35	Dark Horse Comics
2016		Peanuts: A Tribute to Charles M. Schulz	BOOM! Studios

==== Best Graphic Album ====
Best Graphic Album winners, 1988–1990
Year	Author	Title	Publisher
1988	Alan Moore and Dave Gibbons	Watchmen	DC Comics
1989	Alan Moore and Brian Bolland	Batman: The Killing Joke	DC Comics
1990	Chester Brown	Ed the Happy Clown	Vortex Comics

==== Best Graphic Album of Original Work ====
Best Graphic Album of Original Work winners, 1991–2016
Year	Author	Title	Publisher
1991	Kyle Baker	Why I Hate Saturn	Piranha Press
1992	Will Eisner, edited by Dave Schreiner	To the Heart of the Storm	Kitchen Sink Press
1993	Oscar Wilde and P. Craig Russell	Fairy Tales of Oscar Wilde	NBM Publishing
1994	Scott McCloud, edited by Mark Martin	Understanding Comics	Tundra/Kitchen Sink Press
1995	Harvey Pekar, Joyce Brabner, and Frank Stack	Our Cancer Year	Four Walls Eight Windows
1996	Howard Cruse	Stuck Rubber Baby	
1997	Joe Kubert, edited by Bob Cooper	Fax from Sarajevo	Dark Horse Comics
1998	Frank Miller, edited by Diana Schutz	Sin City: Family Values	Dark Horse Comics
1999	Kyle Baker	You Are Here	Paradox
2000	Paul Dini and Alex Ross, edited by Charles Kochman and Joey Cavalieri	Batman: War on Crime	DC Comics
2001	Will Eisner, edited by Diana Schutz	Last Day in Vietnam	Dark Horse Comics/Maverick
2002	James Sturm	The Golem's Mighty Swing	Drawn & Quarterly
2003	Larry Gonick	The Cartoon History of the Universe III: From the Rise of Arabia to the Renaissance	W. W. Norton & Company
2004	Craig Thompson	Blankets	Top Shelf Productions
2005	Juanjo Guarnido and Juan Díaz Canales	Blacksad 2	iBooks/Komikwerks
2006	Alex Robinson	Tricked	Top Shelf Productions
2007	Brian K. Vaughan and Niko Henrichon	Pride of Baghdad	DC Comics/Vertigo
2008	Bryan Lee O'Malley	Scott Pilgrim Gets It Together	Oni Press
2009	Alex Robinson	Too Cool to Be Forgotten	Top Shelf Productions
2010	David Mazzucchelli	Asterios Polyp	Pantheon
2011	Bryan Lee O'Malley	Scott Pilgrim Volume 6: Scott Pilgrim's Finest Hour	Oni Press
2012	Ramón K. Pérez and Jim Henson	Jim Henson's Tale Of Sand	Archaia Entertainment
2013	Darwyn Cooke	Richard Stark's Parker: The Score	IDW Publishing
2014	Vivek Tiwary, Andrew C. Robinson, and Kyle Baker	The Fifth Beatle: The Brian Epstein Story	Dark Horse Comics
2015	Roger Langridge and Jim Henson	Jim Henson's The Musical Monsters of Turkey Hollow	Archaia/BOOM! Studios
2016	John Lewis, Andrew Aydin, and Nate Powell	March: Book Two	Top Shelf Productions

==== Best Graphic Album of Previously Published Work ====
Best Graphic Album of Previously Published Work winners, 1991–2016
Year	Author	Title	Publisher
1991	Drew Friedman and Josh Alan Friedman	Warts and All	Raw/Penguin Books
1992	Art Spiegelman	Maus II	Pantheon Books
1993	Harvey Kurtzman, edited by Dave Schreiner	Hey Look!	Kitchen Sink Press
1994	Jeff Smith	The Complete Bone Adventures	Scholastic Corporation
1995	Kurt Busiek and Alex Ross, edited by Marcus McLaurin	Marvels	Graphitti Graphics
1996	Mike Mignola, edited by Barbara Kesel and Scott Alley	Hellboy: The Wolves of Saint August	Dark Horse Comics
1998	Bob Kahan (ed.), art directed by Robbin Brosterman, Mark Chiarello, and George Brewer	Batman: Black and White	DC Comics
1999	Dave McKean	Cages	Kitchen Sink Press
2000	Alan Moore and Eddie Campbell	From Hell	Eddie Campbell Comics
2001	Chris Ware, edited by Chip Kidd	Jimmy Corrigan, the Smartest Kid on Earth	Pantheon Books
2002	Kazuo Koike and Goseki Kojima	Lone Wolf and Cub	Dark Horse Comics
2003	Daniel Clowes	20th Century Eightball	Fantagraphics
2004	Chester Brown	Louis Riel	Drawn & Quarterly
2005	Jeff Smith	Bone: One Volume Edition	Cartoon Books
2006	Charles Burns	Black Hole	Pantheon
2007	Darwyn Cooke	Absolute New Frontier	DC Comics
2008	Ed Brubaker, Steve Epting, and Mike Perkins	Captain America Omnibus, Volume 1	Marvel Comics
2009	Kyle Baker	Nat Turner	Abrams Books
2010	Bryan J. L. Glass and Michael Avon Oeming	The Mice Templar, Volume 1	Image Comics
2011	Evan Dorkin and Jill Thompson	Beasts of Burden: Animal Rites	Dark Horse Comics
2012	Daniel Clowes	The Death-Ray	Drawn & Quarterly
2013	Archie Goodwin and Walter Simonson	Alien: The Illustrated Story	Titan Books
2014	David Petersen	Mouse Guard Volume Three: The Black Axe	BOOM! Studios/Archaia
2015	Peter Petersen	Mouse Guard Baldwin the Brave and other tales	Archaia/BOOM! Studios
2016		The Less Than Epic Adventures of TJ and Amal	Iron Circus Comics

==== Best Anthology ====
Best Anthology winners, 1990–2016
Year	Editor(s)	Title	Publisher
1990		A1	Atomeka Press
1991	Art Spiegelman and Françoise Mouly	Raw	Raw/Penguin Books
1992	Randy Stradley	Dark Horse Presents	Dark Horse Comics
1993	Randy Stradley	Dark Horse Presents	Dark Horse Comics
1994	Monte Beauchamp	Blab!	Kitchen Sink Press
1995	Bob Schreck and Randy Stradley	Dark Horse Presents	Dark Horse Comics
1996	Marina Lesenko	Drawn & Quarterly	Drawn & Quarterly
1997	Bob Schreck	Dark Horse Presents	Dark Horse Comics
1998	Bob Schreck and Jamie S. Rich	Dark Horse Presents	Dark Horse Comics
1999	Bob Schreck	Oni Double Feature	Oni Press
2000	Scott Dunbier	Tomorrow Stories	ABC
2001	Chris Oliveros	Drawn & Quarterly Vol. 3, #1	Drawn & Quarterly
2002		Bizarro	DC Comics
2003		Comics Journal Summer Special 2002	Fantagraphics
2004	Chris Oliveros	Drawn & Quarterly #5	Drawn & Quarterly
2005	Diana Schutz	Michael Chabon Presents: The Amazing Adventures of the Escapist	Dark Horse Comics
2005	Chris Ware	McSweeney's Quarterly Concern #13	McSweeney's
2006		Solo	DC Comics
2007	Kazu Kibuishi	Flight vol. 3	Ballantine Books
2008	Mark Andrew Smith and Joe Keatinge	Popgun vol. 1	Image Comics
2009	Rantz Hoseley and Tori Amos	Comic Book Tattoo	Image Comics
2010		Wednesday Comics	DC Comics
2011	D.J. Kirkbride, Anthony Wu, and Adam P. Knave	Popgun #4	Image Comics
2012	Mike Richardson	Dark Horse Presents	Dark Horse Comics
2013	Mike Richardson	Dark Horse Presents	Dark Horse Comics
2014	Mike Richardson	Dark Horse Presents	Dark Horse Comics
2015	Mike Richardson	Dark Horse Presents	Dark Horse Comics
2016		Peanuts: A Tribute To Charles M. Schulz	KaBOOM!/BOOM! Studios

==== Best Syndicated Strip or Panel ====
Best Syndicated Strip or Panel winners, 1990–2016
Year	Author	Title	Publisher
1990	Bill Watterson	Calvin and Hobbes	Universal Press Syndicate
1991	Bill Watterson	Calvin and Hobbes	Universal Press Syndicate
1992	Bill Watterson	Calvin and Hobbes	Universal Press Syndicate
1993	Bill Watterson	Calvin and Hobbes	Universal Press Syndicate
1994	Bill Watterson	Calvin and Hobbes	Universal Press Syndicate
1995	Bill Watterson	Calvin and Hobbes	Universal Press Syndicate
1996	Bill Watterson	Calvin and Hobbes	Universal Press Syndicate
1997	Scott Adams	Dilbert	United Feature Syndicate
1998	Patrick McDonnell	Mutts	King Features Syndicate
1999	Lynn Johnston	For Better or For Worse	United Feature Syndicate
2000	Charles M. Schulz	Peanuts	
2001	Patrick McDonnell	Mutts	King Features Syndicate
2002	Patrick McDonnell	Mutts	King Features Syndicate
2003	Patrick McDonnell	Mutts	King Features Syndicate
2004	Tony Millionaire	Maakies	
2005	Patrick McDonnell	Mutts	King Features Syndicate
2006	Tony Millionaire	Maakies	Self-syndicated
2007	Keith Knight	The K Chronicles	
2008	Garry Trudeau	Doonesbury	Universal Press Syndicate
2009	Patrick McDonnell	Mutts	King Features Syndicate
2010	Patrick McDonnell	Mutts	King Features Syndicate
2011	Garry Trudeau	Doonesbury	Universal Press Syndicate
2012	Richard Thompson	Cul De Sac	Universal Press Syndicate
2013	Mike Curtis and Joe Staton	Dick Tracy	Tribune Media Services
2014	Mike Curtis and Joe Staton	Dick Tracy	Tribune Media Services
2015	Mike Curtis and Joe Staton	Dick Tracy	Tribune Media Services
2016	Berkeley Breathed	Bloom County	Universal Uclick

==== Best Biographical, Historical, or Journalistic Presentation ====
Best Biographical, Historical, or Journalistic Presentation winners, 1990–2016
Year	Author	Title	Publisher
1990	Gary Groth (ed.)	The Comics Journal	Fantagraphics
1991	Gary Groth and Helena Harvilicz (ed.)	The Comics Journal	Fantagraphics
1992	Gary Groth, Helena Harvilicz, and Frank Young (ed.)	The Comics Journal	Fantagraphics
1993	Gary Groth and Frank Young (ed.)	The Comics Journal	Fantagraphics
1994	Scott McCloud, edited by Mark Martin	Understanding Comics	Tundra/Kitchen Sink Press
1995	Gary Groth and Frank Young (ed.)	The Comics Journal	Comics Journal Inc.
1996	Terry Zwigoff (dir.), produced by Terry Zwigoff and Lynn O'Donnell	Crumb	Sony Pictures
1997	Gary Groth and Tom Spurgeon (ed.)	The Comics Journal	Fantagraphics
1998	Gary Groth (ed.)	The Comics Journal	Fantagraphics
1999	Gary Groth and Tom Spurgeon (ed.)	The Comics Journal	Fantagraphics
2000		The Comics Journal	Fantagraphics
2001		The Comics Journal	Fantagraphics
2002	Steve Korte (ed.)	Jack Cole and Plastic Man	Chronicle Books
2003		B. Krigstein Vol. 1	Fantagraphics
2004		Comic Art	Comic Art
2005	Jon B. Cooke (ed.)	Comic Book Artist	Top Shelf Productions
2006	Gary Groth (ed.)	The Comics Journal	Fantagraphics
2007	Dan Nadel (ed.)	Art Out of Time	Harry N. Abrams
2008		Reading Comics: How Graphic Albums Work and What They Mean by	Da Capo Press
2009	Mark Evanier	Kirby: King of Comics	Abrams Books
2010	Denis Kitchen and Paul Buhle	Art of Harvey Kurtzman: The Mad Genius of Comics	Abrams ComicArts
2011	Todd Ignite (ed.)	The Art of Jaime Hernandez: The Secrets of Life And Death	Abrams ComicArts
2012	Dean Mullaney and Bruce Canwell	Genius Isolated: The Life And Art Of Alex Toth	IDW Publishing
2013		Robot 6	Comic Book Resources
2014	Vivek Tiwary, Andrew Robinson, and Kyle Baker	The Fifth Beatle: The Brian Epstein Story	Dark Horse
2015	Andrew Farago	Teenage Mutant Ninja Turtles The Ultimate Visual History	Insight Editions
2016		March: Book Two	Top Shelf Productions

==== Best American Edition of Foreign Material ====
Best American Edition of Foreign Material winners, 1988–2016
Year	Author	Title	Publisher
1988	Jean "Moebius" Giraud	Moebius album series	Marvel Comics
1989	Alejandro Jodorowsky and Jean "Moebius" Giraud	The Incal	Marvel Comics
1990	Katsuhiro Otomo	Akira	Marvel Comics
1991	Jean "Moebius" Giraud	Lt. Blueberry	Marvel Comics/Epic
1992	Katsuhiro Otomo	Akira	Marvel Comics/Epic
1993	Katsuhiro Otomo	Akira	Marvel Comics/Epic
1994	José Antonio and Carlos Sampayo; edited by Gary Groth, Robert Boyd, and Kim Thompson	Billie Holiday	Fantagraphics
1995	Paolo Muñoz Serpieri, edited by Debra Rabas	Druuna: Carnivora	Heavy Metal/Kitchen Sink Press
1996	Katsuhiro Otomo, trans. by Yoko Umezawa and Jo Duffy, edited by Kochi Yuri, Hisataka Nishitani, and Marie Javins	Akira	Marvel Comics/Epic
1997	Masashi Tanaka, edited by Andrew Helfer	Gon	DC Comics/Paradox Press
1998	Chris Oliveros, Marina Lesenko, and Steve Solomos (eds.)	Drawn & Quarterly	Drawn & Quarterly
1999	Vittorio Giardino, edited by Terry Nantier, translated by Joe Johnson	A Jew in Communist Prague, vol. 3: Rebellion	NBM Publishing
2000	Toshiki Kudo and Shin-Ichi Hiromoto, edited by David Land	Star Wars: The Manga	Dark Horse Comics
2001	Kazuo Koike and Goseki Kojima, edited by Mike Hansen	Lone Wolf and Cub	Dark Horse Comics
2002	Kazuo Koike and Goseki Kojima, edited by Mike Hansen	Lone Wolf and Cub	Dark Horse Comics
2003	Kazuo Koike and Goseki Kojima, edited by Mike Hansen	Lone Wolf and Cub	Dark Horse Comics
2004	Marjane Satrapi	Persepolis	Pantheon Books
2005	Osamu Tezuka	Buddha	Vertical Inc.
2006	Osamu Tezuka	Buddha	Vertical Inc.
2007	Tove Jansson	Moomin	Drawn & Quarterly
2007	Yoshihiro Tatsumi	Abandon the Old in Tokyo	Drawn & Quarterly
2008	Eduardo Risso	Eduardo Risso's Tales of Terror	Dynamite Entertainment
2009	Chris Blain	Gus and His Gang	First Second Books
2010	Helen McCarthy	The Art of Osamu Tezuka: The God of Manga	Abrams ComicArts
2011	Juan Díaz Canales and Juanjo Guarnido	Blacksad	Dark Horse Comics
2012	Milo Manara	The Manara Library, vol. 1: Indian Summer and Other Stories	Dark Horse Comics
2013	Juan Díaz Canales and Juanjo Guarnido	Blacksad: A Silent Hell	Dark Horse Comics
2014	Hajime Isayama	Attack on Titan	Kodansha USA
2015	Juan Díaz Canales and Juanjo Guarnido	Blacksad: Amarillo	Dark Horse Comics
2016		Two Brothers	Dark Horse Comics
2016		Corto Maltese: Beyond the Windy Isles	IDW Publishing

==== Best Domestic Reprint Project ====
Best Domestic Reprint Project winners, 1988–2016
Year	Author	Title	Publisher
1988	Will Eisner	The Spirit	Kitchen Sink Press
1989	Robert Crumb	The Complete Crumb Comics	Fantagraphics
1990	Winsor McCay	Complete Little Nemo In Slumberland	Fantagraphics
1991	Robert Crumb	The Complete Crumb Comics	Fantagraphics
1992	Robert Crumb	The Complete Crumb Comics	Fantagraphics
1993	Robert Crumb	The Complete Crumb Comics	Fantagraphics
1994	Winsor McCay, edited by Bill Blackbeard, packaged by Dale Crain	Complete Little Nemo in Slumberland, Vol. 6	Fantagraphics
1995	Robert Crumb, edited by Gary Groth and Robert Boyd, art direction by Mark Thompson	The Complete Crumb Comics	Fantagraphics
1996	Robert Crumb, edited by Mark Thompson	The Complete Crumb Comics, Vol. II	Fantagraphics
1997	Frank Miller, original series co-edited by Dick Giordano and Dennis O'Neil, reprint edited by Archie Goodwin and Bob Kahan	Batman: The Dark Knight Returns, 10th Anniversary Hardcover Edition	DC Comics
1998	Jack Kirby, edited by Bob Kahan	New Gods	DC Comics
1999	Jack Cole, edited by Bob Kahan and Rick Taylor	DC Archives: Plastic Man	DC Comics
2000	Dale Crain (ed.)	DC Archive Series	DC Comics
2001	Will Eisner, edited by Dale Crain	Spirit Archives	DC Comics
2002		Spirit Archives	DC Comics
2003		Krazy and Ignatz	Fantagraphics
2004	George Herriman, edited by Bill Blackbeard	Krazy and Ignatz	Fantagraphics
2005	Charles Schulz	The Complete Peanuts 1950-52	Fantagraphics
2006		Little Nemo in Slumberland: So Many Splendid Sundays	Sunday Press Books
2007		The Complete Peanuts	Fantagraphics
2010	Dave Stevens, edited by Scott Dunbier	The Rocketeer: The Complete Adventures	IDW Publishing
2011	Randall Dahlk (designer), edited by Scott Dunbier	Dave Stevens' Rocketeer: Artist's Edition	IDW Publishing
2012		Walt Simonson's The Mighty Thor, Artist's Edition	IDW Publishing
2013	Scott Dunbier (ed.)	David Mazzucchelli's Daredevil Born Again: Artist's Edition	IDW Publishing
2014	Denis Kitchen and John Lind (eds.)	The Best of Comix Book: When Marvel Comics Went Underground	Kitchen Sink Books/Dark Horse Comics
2015	Jim Steranko	Nick Fury, Agent of S.H.I.E.L.D. Artist's Edition	IDW Publishing
2016		Crimson Vol. 1	Boom! Studios

==== Best Online Comics Work ====
Best Online Comics Work winners, 2006–2016
Year	Author	Title	Publisher
2006	James Kochalka	American Elf	American Elf
2007	Nicholas Gurewitch	The Perry Bible Fellowship	PBF comics
2008	Nicholas Gurewitch	The Perry Bible Fellowship	PBF comics
2009	David Gallaher	High Moon	High Moon
2010	Scott Kurtz, Steve Ellis, and Scott O. Brown	PvP	PvP
2011	Kate Beaton	Hark! A Vagrant	Hark! A Vagrant
2012	Kate Beaton	Hark! A Vagrant	Hark! A Vagrant
2013	Mike Norton	Battlepug	Battlepug
2014	Mike Norton	Battlepug	Battlepug
2015	Brian K. Vaughan, Marcos Martin, and Muntsa Vicente	The Private Eye	Panel Syndicate
2016	Mike Norton	Battlepug	Battlepug

==== Best European Book Award ====
Best European Book Award winners, 2018–2019
Year	Author	Title	Publisher
2018	Pénélope Bagieu	California Dreamin': Cass Elliot Before the Mamas & the Papas	First Second Books
2019	Ingrid Chabbert and Carole Maurel	Waves	Archaia

=== People ===
==== Best Writer ====
Best Writer winners, 1988-2016
Year	Writer	Title	Publisher
1988	Alan Moore	Watchmen	DC Comics
1989	Gilbert Hernandez	Love and Rockets	Fantagraphics
1990	Gilbert Hernandez	Love and Rockets	Fantagraphics
1991	Neil Gaiman	The Sandman	DC Comics
1992	Neil Gaiman	The Sandman	DC Comics
1993	Will Eisner	Invisible People	Kitchen Sink Press
1994	Scott McCloud	Understanding Comics	Tundra/Kitchen Sink Press
1995	Alan Moore	From Hell	Kitchen Sink Press
1996	Alan Moore	From Hell	Kitchen Sink Press
1997	Daniel Clowes	Eightball	Fantagraphics
1998	Kurt Busiek	Astro City	Image Comics/Homage Comics
1998	Kurt Busiek	Avengers	Marvel Comics
1998	Kurt Busiek	Thunderbolts	Marvel Comics
1999	Alan Moore	From Hell	Kitchen Sink Press
1999	Alan Moore	Supreme	Awesome
2000	Alan Moore	The League of Extraordinary Gentlemen	ABC
2001	Alan Moore	Promethea	ABC
2002	Brian Azzarello	100 Bullets	DC Comics
2003	Alan Moore	Promethea	ABC
2004	Chester Brown	Louis Riel	Drawn & Quarterly
2005	Daniel Clowes	Eightball	Fantagraphics
2006	Ed Brubaker	Captain America	Marvel Comics
2007	Ed Brubaker	Daredevil	Marvel Comics
2008	Brian K. Vaughan	Y: The Last Man	DC Comics/Vertigo Comics
2009	Grant Morrison	All-Star Superman	DC Comics
2010	Robert Kirkman	The Walking Dead	Image Comics
2011	Roger Langridge	Thor: The Mighty Avenger	Marvel Comics
2012	Mark Waid	Daredevil	Marvel Comics
2013	Brian K. Vaughan	Saga	Image Comics
2014	Brian K. Vaughan	Saga	Image Comics
2015	Mark Waid	Daredevil	Marvel Comics
2016	Brian K. Vaughan	Saga	Image Comics

==== Best Artist or Penciller ====
Best Artist or Penciller winners, 1988–2016
Year	Artist	Title	Publisher
1988	Dave Gibbons	Watchmen	DC Comics
1989	Brian Bolland	Batman: The Killing Joke	DC Comics
1990	Mark Schultz	Xenozoic Tales	Kitchen Sink Press
1991	Steve Rude	World's Finest Comics	DC Comics
1992	Mark Schultz	Xenozoic Tales	Kitchen Sink Press
1993	Mark Schultz	Xenozoic Tales	Kitchen Sink Press
1994	Alex Ross	Marvels	Marvel Comics
1995	Mike Mignola	Hellboy	Dark Horse Comics
1996	Mike Mignola	Hellboy	Dark Horse Comics
1997	Alex Ross	Kingdom Come	DC Comics
1998	P. Craig Russell	Elric: Stormbringer	Dark Horse Comics/Topps Comics
1998	P. Craig Russell	Dr. Strange: What Is It That Disturbs You, Stephen?	Marvel Comics
1999	Jaime Hernández	Penny Century	Fantagraphics
2000	Mike Mignola	Hellboy: Box Full of Evil	Dark Horse Comics/Maverick
2001	Jaime Hernández	Penny Century	Fantagraphics
2002	Eduardo Risso	100 Bullets	DC Comics
2003	Eduardo Risso	100 Bullets	DC Comics
2004	Craig Thompson	Blankets	Top Shelf Productions
2005	Darwyn Cooke	DC: The New Frontier	DC Comics
2006	J. H. Williams III	Promethea	DC Comics/ABC/WildStorm
2007	Frank Quitely	All-Star Superman	DC Comics
2008	Frank Quitely	All-Star Superman	DC Comics
2009	Gabriel Bá	The Umbrella Academy	Dark Horse Comics
2010	Robert Crumb	The Book of Genesis	
2011	Darwyn Cooke	Richard Stark's Parker: The Outfit	IDW Publishing
2012	J. H. Williams III	Batwoman	DC Comics
2013	Fiona Staples	Saga	Image Comics
2014	Fiona Staples	Saga	Image Comics
2015	Fiona Staples	Saga	Image Comics
2016	Fiona Staples	Saga	Image Comics

==== Best Cartoonist (Writer/Artist) ====
Best Cartoonist (Writer/Artist) winners, 1988–2016
Year	Cartoonist	Title	Publisher
1988	Paul Chadwick	Concrete	Dark Horse Comics
1989	Paul Chadwick	Concrete	Dark Horse Comics
1990	Chester Brown	Yummy Fur	Vortex Comics
1991	Peter Bagge	Hate	Fantagraphics
1992	Dave Sim	Cerebus	Aardvark-Vanaheim
1993	Will Eisner	Invisible People	Kitchen Sink Press
1994	Jeff Smith	Bone	Cartoon Books
1995	Jeff Smith	Bone	Cartoon Books
1996	Jeff Smith	Bone	Cartoon Books/Image Comics
1997	Jeff Smith	Bone	Cartoon Books/Image Comics
1998	Sergio Aragonés	Louder than Words	Dark Horse Comics
1999	Jeff Smith	Bone	Cartoon Books
2000	Jeff Smith	Bone	Cartoon Books
2001	Al Jaffee	Mad Magazine	E.C. Publications
2002	Daniel Clowes	Eightball	Fantagraphics
2003	Jeff Smith	Bone	Cartoon Books
2004	Craig Thompson	Blankets	Top Shelf Productions
2005	Jeff Smith	Bone	Cartoon Books
2006	Chris Ware	Acme Novelty Library	Acme Novelty Library
2007	Jaime Hernández	Love and Rockets	Fantagraphics
2008	Darwyn Cooke	The Spirit	DC Comics
2009	Al Jaffee	Tall Tales	Abrams Books
2010	Darwyn Cooke	Richard Stark's Parker: The Hunter	IDW Publishing
2011	Darwyn Cooke	Richard Stark's Parker: The Outfit	IDW Publishing
2012	Kate Beaton	Hark! A Vagrant	Drawn & Quarterly
2013	Jaime Hernández	Love and Rockets: New Stories	Fantagraphics
2014	Paul Pope	Battling Boy	First Second Books
2015	Terry Moore	Rachel Rising	Abstract Studio
2016	Stan Sakai	Usagi Yojimbo	

==== Best Inker ====
Best Inker winners, 1988–2016
Year	Inker	Title	Publisher
1988	Al Williamson	Daredevil	Marvel Comics
1989	Al Williamson	Daredevil	Marvel Comics
1990	Al Williamson	Daredevil	Marvel Comics
1991	Al Williamson	Fafhrd and the Gray Mouser	Marvel Comics/Epic
1992	Jaime Hernández	Love and Rockets	Fantagraphics
1993	Al Williamson	Spider-Man 2099	Marvel Comics
1994	Al Williamson	Spider-Man 2099	Marvel Comics
1995	Al Williamson	Spider-Man 2099	Marvel Comics
1996	Kevin Nowlan	Superman vs. Aliens	DC Comics/Dark Horse Comics
1997	Mark Schultz	Xenozoic Tales	Kitchen Sink Press
1998	Charles Burns	Black Hole	Kitchen Sink Press
1999	Charles Burns	Black Hole	Fantagraphics
2000	Jaime Hernández	Penny Century	Fantagraphics
2001	Charles Burns	Black Hole	Fantagraphics
2002	Charles Burns	Black Hole	Fantagraphics
2003	Jaime Hernández	Love and Rockets	Fantagraphics
2004	Charles Burns	Black Hole	Fantagraphics
2005	Charles Burns	Black Hole	Fantagraphics
2006	Charles Burns	Black Hole	Fantagraphics
2007	Danny Miki	Eternals	Marvel Comics
2008	Kevin Nowlan	Witchblade	Top Cow Productions/Image Comics
2009	Mark Morales	Thor	Marvel Comics
2010	Klaus Janson	The Amazing Spider-Man	Marvel Comics
2011	Mark Morales	Thor	Marvel Comics
2012	Joe Rivera	Daredevil	Marvel Comics
2013	Klaus Janson	Captain America	Marvel Comics
2014	Wade Von Grawbadger	All New X-Men	Marvel Comics
2015	Danny Miki	Batman	DC Comics
2016	Klaus Janson	The Dark Knight III: The Master Race	DC Comics

==== Best Letterer ====
Best Letterer winners, 1988–2016
Year	Letterer	Work	Publisher
1988	Ken Bruzenak	American Flagg!	First
1989	Ken Bruzenak	Mr. Monster	Dark Horse Comics
1990	Ken Bruzenak	Black Kiss	Vortex Comics
1991	Dan Clowes	Eightball	Fantagraphics
1992	Todd Klein	The Sandman	DC Comics
1993	Todd Klein	The Sandman	DC Comics
1994	Tom Orzechowski	Spawn	Image Comics
1995	Todd Klein	The Sandman	DC Comics
1996	Chris Ware	Acme Novelty Library	Fantagraphics
1997	Dan Clowes	Eightball	Fantagraphics
1998	Todd Klein	Ka-Zar	
1998	Todd Klein	Castle Waiting	
1998	Todd Klein	Uncle Sam	
1999	Todd Klein	House of Secrets	
1999	Todd Klein	Captain America	
2000	Chris Ware	Acme Novelty Library	Fantagraphics
2001	Todd Klein	Castle Waiting	Cartoon Books
2002	Chris Ware	Acme Novelty Library	Fantagraphics
2003	Todd Klein	Promethea	ABC
2004	Dave Sim	Cerebus	Aardvark-Vanaheim
2005	Todd Klein	Wonder Woman	DC Comics
2006	Chris Ware	Acme Novelty Library	ACME Novelty Library
2007	Stan Sakai	Usagi Yojimbo	Dark Horse Comics
2008	Chris Eliopoulos	Daredevil	Marvel Comics
2009	John Workman	Marvel 1985	Marvel Comics
2010	David Mazzucchelli	Asterios Polyp	Pantheon Books
2011	John Workman	Thor	Marvel Comics
2012	Chris Eliopoulos	Fear Itself	Marvel Comics
2013	Todd Klein	Fables	DC Comics/Vertigo Comics
2014	Terry Moore	Rachel Rising	Abstract Studio
2015	Jack Morelli	Afterlife with Archie	Archie Comics
2016	John Workman	Ragnarok	IDW Publishing

==== Best Colorist ====
- 1988 John Higgins, for Watchmen (DC)
- 1989 John Higgins, for Batman: The Killing Joke (DC)
- 1990 Steve Oliff, for Akira (Marvel Comics)
- 1991 Steve Oliff, for Akira (Marvel Comics/Epic Comics)
- 1992 Steve Oliff, for Akira (Marvel Comics/Epic Comics)
- 1993 Jim Woodring, for Tantalizing Stories Presents Frank In The River (Tundra)
- 1994 Steve Oliff, for Spawn (Image)
- 1995 Steve Oliff/Olyoptics, for Spawn (Image)
- 1996 Chris Ware, for Acme Novelty Library (Fantagraphics Books)
- 1997 Chris Ware, for Acme Novelty Library (Fantagraphics Books)
- 1998 Chris Ware, for his body of work in 1997, including Acme Novelty Library (Fantagraphics Books)
- 1999 Lynn Varley, for 300 (Dark Horse Comics)
- 2000 Chris Ware, for Acme Novelty Library (Fantagraphics Books)
- 2001 Laura DePuy, for The Authority (WildStorm/DC)
- 2002 Chris Ware, for Acme Novelty Library (Fantagraphics Books)
- 2003 Dave Stewart, for Hellboy (Dark Horse Comics)
- 2004 Chris Ware, for Acme Novelty Datebook (Drawn & Quarterly Publishing)
- 2005 Dave Stewart, for DC: The New Frontier (DC)
- 2006 Laura Martin, for Astonishing X-Men (Marvel Comics)
- 2007 Lark Pien, for American Born Chinese (First Second Books)
- 2008 Laura Martin, for Thor (Marvel Comics)
- 2009 Dave Stewart, for The Umbrella Academy (Dark Horse Comics)
- 2010 Laura Martin, for The Rocketeer: the Complete Adventures (IDW)
- 2011 José Villarrubia, for Cuba: My Revolution (Vertigo/DC)
- 2012 Dave Stewart, for Hellboy: The Fury (Dark Horse Comics)
- 2013 Fiona Staples, for Saga (Image Comics)
- 2014 Dave Stewart, for Hellboy: The Midnight Circus (Dark Horse Comics)
- 2015 Dave Stewart, for Hellboy in Hell (Dark Horse Comics)
- 2016 Laura Allred, for Silver Surfer (Marvel Comics)

==== Best Cover Artist ====
- 1996 Alex Ross, for Kurt Busiek's Astro City #1 (Image)
- 1997 Alex Ross, for Kingdom Come #1 (DC)
- 1998 Alex Ross, for Kurt Busiek's Astro City (Image/Homage), Batman: Legends of the Dark Knight #100 (DC), Squadron Supreme (Marvel Comics)
- 1999 Alex Ross, for Kurt Busiek's Astro City (Image/Homage), Superman Forever (DC), Superman: Peace on Earth (DC)
- 2000 Chris Ware, for Acme Novelty Library (Fantagraphics Books)
- 2001 Adam Hughes, for Wonder Woman (DC)
- 2002 Adam Hughes, for Wonder Woman (DC)
- 2003 Adam Hughes, for Wonder Woman (DC)
- 2004 Charles Burns, for Black Hole (Fantagraphics Books)
- 2005 James Jean, for Fables (DC/Vertigo)
- 2006 James Jean, for Fables (DC/Vertigo)
- 2007 James Jean, for Fables (DC/Vertigo)
- 2008 Mike Mignola, for Hellboy (Dark Horse Comics)
- 2009 James Jean, for Fables (DC/Vertigo)
- 2010 Mike Mignola, for Hellboy: The Bride of Hell (Dark Horse Comics)
- 2011 Mike Mignola, for Hellboy (Dark Horse Comics)
- 2012 J. H. Williams, for Batwoman (DC Comics)
- 2013 David Aja, for Hawkeye (Marvel Comics)
- 2014 Fiona Staples, for Saga (Image Comics)
- 2015 Fiona Staples, for Saga (Image Comics)
- 2016 Fiona Staples, for Saga (Image Comics)

==== Best New Talent ====
- 1990 Jim Lee
- 1991 Julie Doucet
- 1992 Joe Quesada
- 1996 Adrian Tomine
- 1997 Jessica Abel, for Artbabe (self-published)
- 1998 Steven Weissman, for Yikes (Alternative Press, Inc.)
- 1999 Kevin Smith, for Clerks (Oni), Daredevil (Marvel Comics), Jay and Silent Bob (Oni)
- 2000 Craig Thompson, for Good-bye, Chunky Rice, etc.
- 2001 Michel Rabagliati, for Drawn & Quarterly Vol. 3, #1, Paul in the Country, etc.
- 2002 Jason, for Hey Wait
- 2003 Nick Bertozzi, for Rubber Necker
- 2004 Derek Kirk Kim, for Same Difference and Other Stories (Alternative Comics)
- 2005 Andy Runton, for Owly (Top Shelf)
- 2006 (tie) Roberto Aguirre-Sacasa, for Marvel Knights 4 (Marvel Comics); R. Kikuo Johnson, for Night Fisher (Fantagraphics Books)
- 2007 Brian Fies
- 2008 Vasilis Lolos, for Last Call (Oni Press)
- 2009 Bryan J. L. Glass, for The Mice Templar (Image Comics)
- 2010 Rob Guillory, for Chew (Image Comics)
- 2011 Chris Samnee, for Thor: The Mighty Avenger (Marvel Comics)
- 2012 Sara Pichelli, for Ultimate Spider-Man (Marvel Comics)

==== Most Promising New Talent ====
- 2013 Dennis Hopeless, for Avengers Arena (Marvel Comics)
- 2014 Chip Zdarsky, for Sex Criminals (Image Comics)
- 2015 Chad Lambert, for "Kill Me" from Dark Horse Presents (Dark Horse Comics)
- 2016 Tom King, for The Vision (Marvel Comics)

=== Special awards ===
==== Special Award for Humor ====
- 1989 Bill Watterson, for Calvin and Hobbes (Universal Press Syndicate/Andrews McMeel Publishing)
- 1990 Sergio Aragonés
- 1991 Sergio Aragonés
- 1992 Sergio Aragonés
- 1993 Sergio Aragonés
- 1994 Jeff Smith
- 1995 Sergio Aragonés
- 1996 Evan Dorkin
- 1997 Sergio Aragonés
- 1998 Sergio Aragonés
- 1999 Sergio Aragonés
- 2000 Sergio Aragonés, for Groo, etc.
- 2001 Sergio Aragonés, for Groo, etc.
- 2002 Evan Dorkin, for Dork (Slave Labor Graphics)
- 2003 Evan Dorkin, for Dork (Slave Labor Graphics)
- 2004 Tony Millionaire, Sock Monkey (Dark Horse Comics)
- 2005 Kyle Baker, for Plastic Man (DC)
- 2006 Kyle Baker, for Plastic Man (DC)
- 2007 Bryan Lee O'Malley, for Scott Pilgrim & The Infinite Sadness (Oni Press)
- 2008 Nicholas Gurewitch, The Perry Bible Fellowship
- 2009 Al Jaffee for Tall Tales (Abrams Books)
- 2010 Bryan Lee O'Malley, for Scott Pilgrim #5 (Oni Press)
- 2011 Roger Langridge, for The Muppet Show Comic Book (BOOM! Studios)
- 2012 Kate Beaton, for Hark! A Vagrant (harkavagrant.com; printed edition published by Drawn & Quarterly)
- 2013 Ryan North, for Adventure Time (KaBOOM! Studios)
- 2014 Ryan North, for Adventure Time (KaBOOM! Studios)
- 2015 Chip Zdarsky, for Sex Criminals (Image Comics)
- 2016 Chip Zdarsky, for Howard the Duck (Marvel Comics)

==== Special Award for Excellence in Presentation ====
- 1988 Watchmen, by Alan Moore and Dave Gibbons, (DC)
- 1989 Hardboiled Defective Stories, by Charles Burns, design by Art Spiegelman and Françoise Mouly (Raw/Pantheon)
- 1990 Arkham Asylum, by Grant Morrison and Dave McKean (DC)
- 1991 Complete Little Nemo in Slumberland, by Winsor McCay, edited by Richard Marschall, designed by Dale Crain (Fantagraphics Books)
- 1992 Complete Little Nemo in Slumberland, by Winsor McCay, edited by Richard Marschall, art directed by Dale Crain (Fantagraphics Books)
- 1993 Batman: Night Cries, by Archie Goodwin and Scott Hampton, edited by Denny O'Neil, art direction by Robbin Brosterman (DC)
- 1994 Marvels, by Kurt Busiek and Alex Ross; edited by Marcus McLaurin; design by Joe Kaufman and Comicraft (Marvel Comics)
- 1995 Acme Novelty Library, by Chris Ware; edited by Kim Thompson (Fantagraphics Books)
- 1996 Acme Novelty Library, by Chris Ware; edited by Kim Thompson; art directed by Chris Ware (Fantagraphics Books)
- 1997 Acme Novelty Library, by Chris Ware; edited by Kim Thompson, art directed by Chris Ware (Fantagraphics Books)
- 1998 Acme Novelty Library, by Chris Ware; edited by Kim Thompson, art directed by Chris Ware (Fantagraphics Books)
- 1999 Acme Novelty Library, by Chris Ware; edited by Kim Thompson, art directed by Chris Ware (Fantagraphics Books)
- 2000 Acme Novelty Library #13, by Chris Ware (Fantagraphics Books)
- 2001 Jimmy Corrigan, by Chris Ware (Pantheon)
- 2002 Spirit Archives designed by Amie Brockway-Metcalf (DC)
- 2003 Krazy and Ignatz, designed by Chris Ware (Fantagraphics Books)
- 2004 Acme Novelty Datebook, by Chris Ware (Drawn & Quarterly Publishing)
- 2005 The Complete Peanuts 1950-52, by Charles Schulz, designed by Seth (Fantagraphics Books)
- 2006 Little Nemo in Slumberland: So Many Splendid Sundays, by Winsor McCay (Sunday Press Books)
- 2007 Lost Girls, art directed by Brett Warnock and Matt Kindt (Top Shelf Productions)
- 2008 EC Archives, Various, edited by Russ Cochran (Gemstone Comics)
- 2009 Kirby: King of Comics, by Mark Evanier (Abrams Books)
- 2010 The Rocketeer: The Complete Adventures by Dave Stevens; edited by Scott Dunbier(IDW)
- 2011 Dave Stevens' Rocketeer: Artist's Edition, designed by Randall Dahlk and edited by Scott Dunbier (IDW)
- 2012 Walt Simonson's The Mighty Thor, Artist's Edition (IDW)
- 2013 Building Stories, by Chris Ware (Pantheon Books)
- 2014 The Best Of Comix Book: When Marvel Comics Went Underground, John Lind, Kitchen Sink Books/(Dark Horse Comics)
- 2015 Little Nemo: Dream Another Dream by Andrew Carl, Josh O'Neill and Chris Stevens (Locust Moon Press)
- 2016 Peanuts: A Tribute to Charles M. Schulz by Scott Newman (Kaboom!/Boom! Studios)

==== The Jack Kirby Hall of Fame ====
Held through 2001.

- 1989 Wally Wood
- 1990 Steve Ditko, Alex Toth
- 1991 Jack Cole, Basil Wolverton
- 1992 Walt Kelly, Bernard Krigstein
- 1993 Jerry Siegel, Joe Shuster
- 1994 Bill Finger, Bob Kane
- 1995 Bill Everett, Stan Lee
- 1996 Carl Burgos, Sheldon Mayer, Julius Schwartz
- 1997 Retroactive: C. C. Beck, William Gaines
- 1997 Lifetime Achievement: Gil Kane, Joe Kubert, Carmine Infantino
- 1997 International: Jean Giraud, also known as Moebius
- 1998 Retroactive: Reed Crandall, Gardner F. Fox
- 1998 Lifetime Achievement: Carmine Infantino, Murphy Anderson
- 1998 International: Milo Manara
- 1999 Retroactive: Otto Binder, Mort Meskin
- 1999 Lifetime Achievement: Neal Adams, Frank Frazetta, John Romita, Sr.
- 1999 International; Georges Remi, also known as Hergé
- 2000 No award
- 2001 Retroactive: Mort Weisinger
- 2001 Lifetime Achievement: Sheldon Moldoff
- 2001 International: Guido Crepax

==== The Hero Initiative Lifetime Achievement Award ====
- 2006 George Pérez, John Romita, Sr.
- 2007 Joe Kubert
- 2011 Stan Lee
- 2016 Joe Giella

==== International Spotlight Award ====
- 2017 Hiro Mashima
- 2018 Harold Sakuishi

==== Comics Industry Pioneer Award ====
- 2018 Jackie Estrada
- 2019 Maggie Thompson

== Sources ==
- 1988-2007 Awards: Harvey Kurtzman Awards 1988-2007, Comic Book Awards Almanac. Archived from the original on March 12, 2018.
- 2008 Nominations: "2008 Harvey Award nominees announced". Comic Book Resources. June 18, 2008. Archived from the original on January 10, 2019.
- 2008 Awards: Millikin, Eric and staff. "Journal Datebook: August, 2008 — October, 2008", p. 25, The Comics Journal Seattle, January 2009.
- 2010 Nominations: "2010 Harvey Awards Nominees Announced" (Press release). July 12, 2010. Archived from the original on March 6, 2016 – via Newsarama.com.
- 2010 Awards: MacDonald, Heidi (August 30, 2010). "2010 Harvey Award winners". ComicsBeat.com. Archived from the original on August 20, 2018.
- 2011 Nominations: "Harvey Awards 2011 Nominees". IGN. July 5, 2011. Archived from the original on December 16, 2012.
- 2011 Awards: Melrose, Kevin (August 21, 2011). "Winners announced for 2011 Harvey Awards". Comic Book Resources. Archived from the original on November 21, 2018.
- 2016 Awards: "2016 Harvey Award Winners Announced". Previews World. September 6, 2016. Archived from the original on July 28, 2017.
- 2018 Awards: "2018 Harvey Award Winners Announced". Comics Beat. October 6, 2018.
- 2019 Awards: "NYCC '19: Presenting the 2019 Harvey Awards winners". Comics Beat. October 4, 2019.
- 2020 Awards: McMillan, Graeme (October 5, 2020). "2020 Harvey Award Winners Revealed". The Hollywood Reporter.
- 2021 Awards: "NYCC '21: Presenting the 2021 Harvey Awards winners". Comics Beat. October 8, 2021.
- 2022 Awards: Chiu-Tabet, Christopher (October 8, 2022). "2022 Harvey Awards Winners Announced. Multiversity Comics. Retrieved October 10, 2022.
