= Tundra (comics) =

Tundra, in comics, may refer to:

- Tundra (comic strip), an Alaska comic strip that started in 1991
- Tundra (Marvel Comics), a Marvel Comics character

== See also ==
- Tundra (disambiguation)
- Tundra Publishing, a comics publisher
