= Chad Carpenter =

American cartoonist

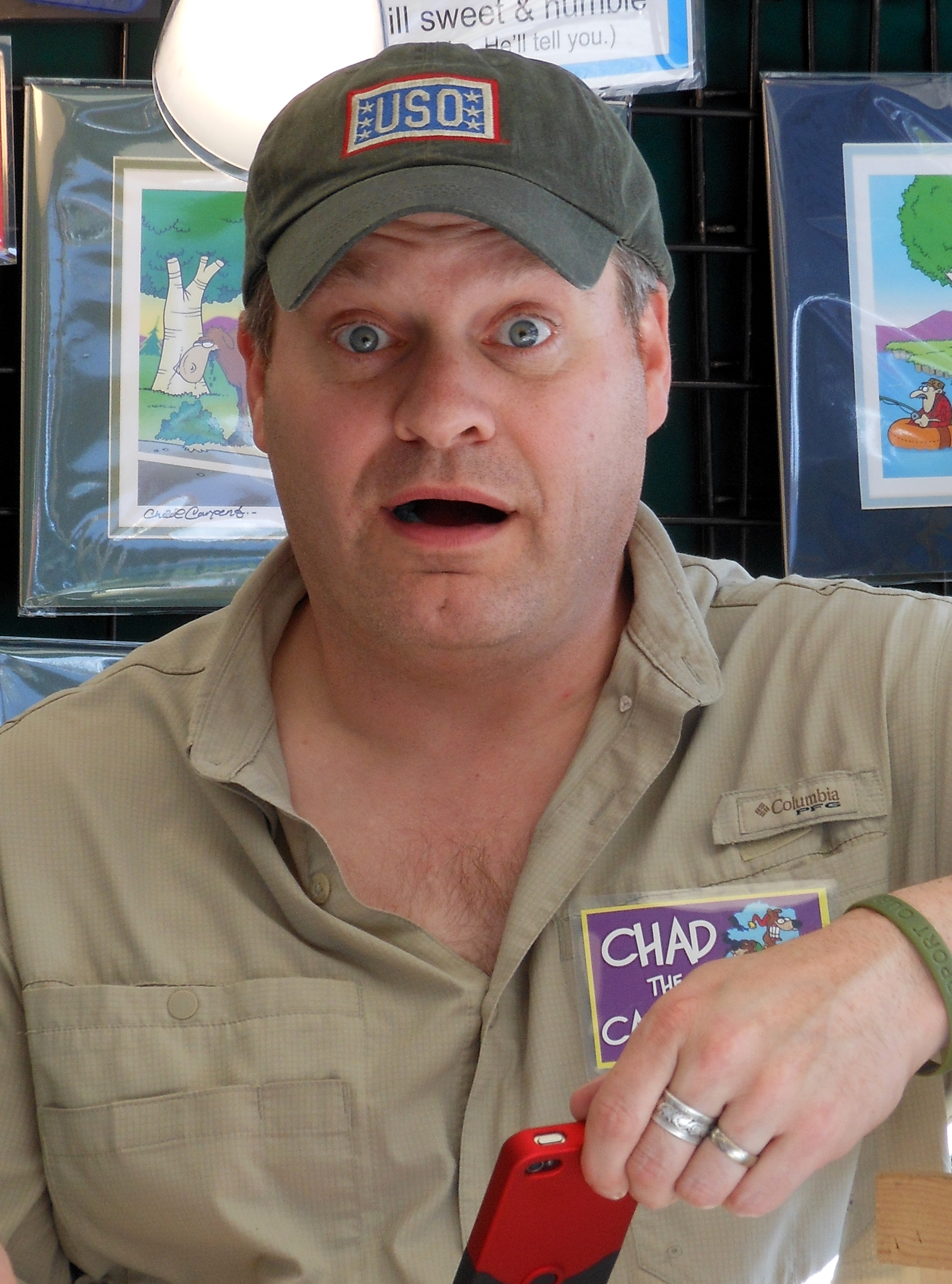
- Chad Carpenter "caught by surprise" at the 2012 Tanana Valley State Fair
- Born: c. 1968 (age 56–57); Michigan, U.S.
- Occupation: Cartoonist
- Years active: 1991–present
- Notable work: Tundra, Moose

Chad Carpenter (born c. 1968) is an American cartoonist, best known for his comic panel Tundra. Carpenter launched the strip in the Anchorage Daily News in his home state of Alaska in 1991. Since then, he has self-syndicated it to over 600 newspapers, an unusually high amount for strips in self-syndication.

== Early life ==
Chad Carpenter was born in Michigan before moving to Alaska with his family at age two, where his father began a career with the Alaska State Troopers. As that job entailed being transferred to different posts across the state, the family lived in a wide variety of communities, which provided him an opportunity to be immersed in nature as he grew up starting at an early age. In a 2015 interview, he gave a characteristically tongue-in-cheek account of his early life, explaining that he came to Alaska "because of all the restraining orders", and that on the eve of entering the Alaska State Trooper Academy to follow in his father's footsteps, he decided against it because "I knew that I was too goofy to carry a gun".

In 1988, while in his early 20s, he left Alaska and moved to Sarasota, Florida. While in Sarasota, he met Dik Browne, the creator of Hägar the Horrible, and Mike Peters, the creator of Mother Goose and Grimm. Both cartoonists advised him; Peters told him to draw what he knew. This inspired Carpenter to create a comic about the nature and wildlife he had come to know so well back in Alaska.

== Tundra ==
Created in 1991, Tundra is published on a daily basis, always in one of two formats: either a single-panel gag comic or a three-panel strip with regular characters and more complex humor. This alternation is similar to that used in Mother Goose and Grimm and Non Sequitur. Unlike those strips, Tundra tends to deal with wildlife and the outdoors; its humor appeals to all demographics, young & old. Tundra also occasionally uses reader-submitted ideas.

Carpenter still self-syndicates the strip within the United States, and currently appears in over 600 newspapers as a result. Since 2007, the strip has been syndicated internationally by King Features Syndicate. It now appears in newspapers in the United States, Canada, Jamaica, Germany, Switzerland, Sweden and Trinidad and Tobago. He has published and sold 20 Tundra books and has also produced extensive amounts of other Tundra-branded merchandise.

In May 2008, Tundra was named the best newspaper panel of 2007 by the National Cartoonists Society.

In August 2008, Carpenter was presented with a legislative citation honoring him as Alaska's Cartoon Laureate. It was presented to him by Wes Keller, a member of the Alaska House of Representatives.

== Other art contracts ==
Carpenter's artistic talents have led to his being contracted for projects with the National Association of Search and Rescue, the Alaska State Troopers, the United States Navy, and other companies.

== Other work ==
Carpenter both wrote and produced the 2015 supernatural comedy thriller film Moose the Movie together with his brother Darin Carpenter. He additionally wrote the 2018 western comedy film Sudsy Slim Rides Again with his brother.
