= Fifth Beatle =

Informal title for associates of the Beatles

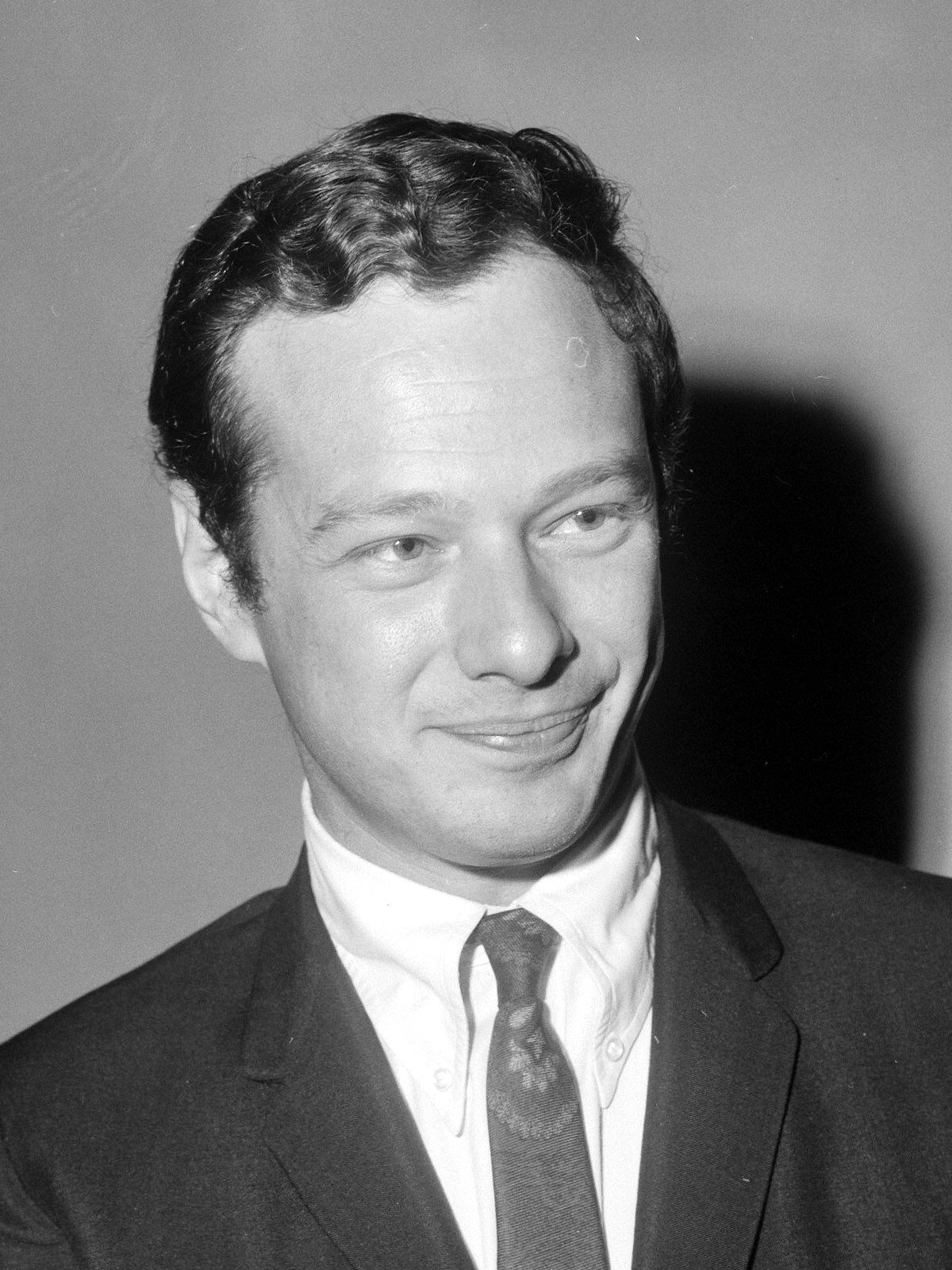
Brian Epstein

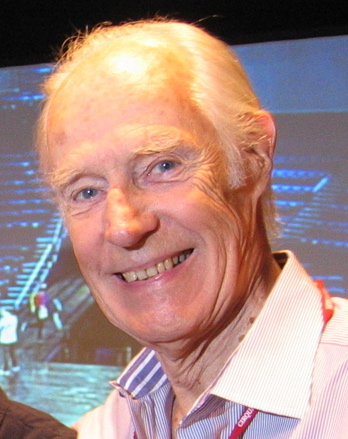
George Martin

Derek Taylor

Neil Aspinall

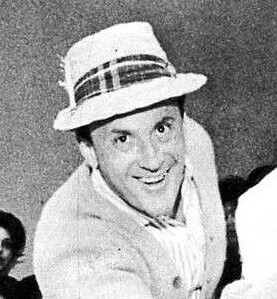
Murray the K

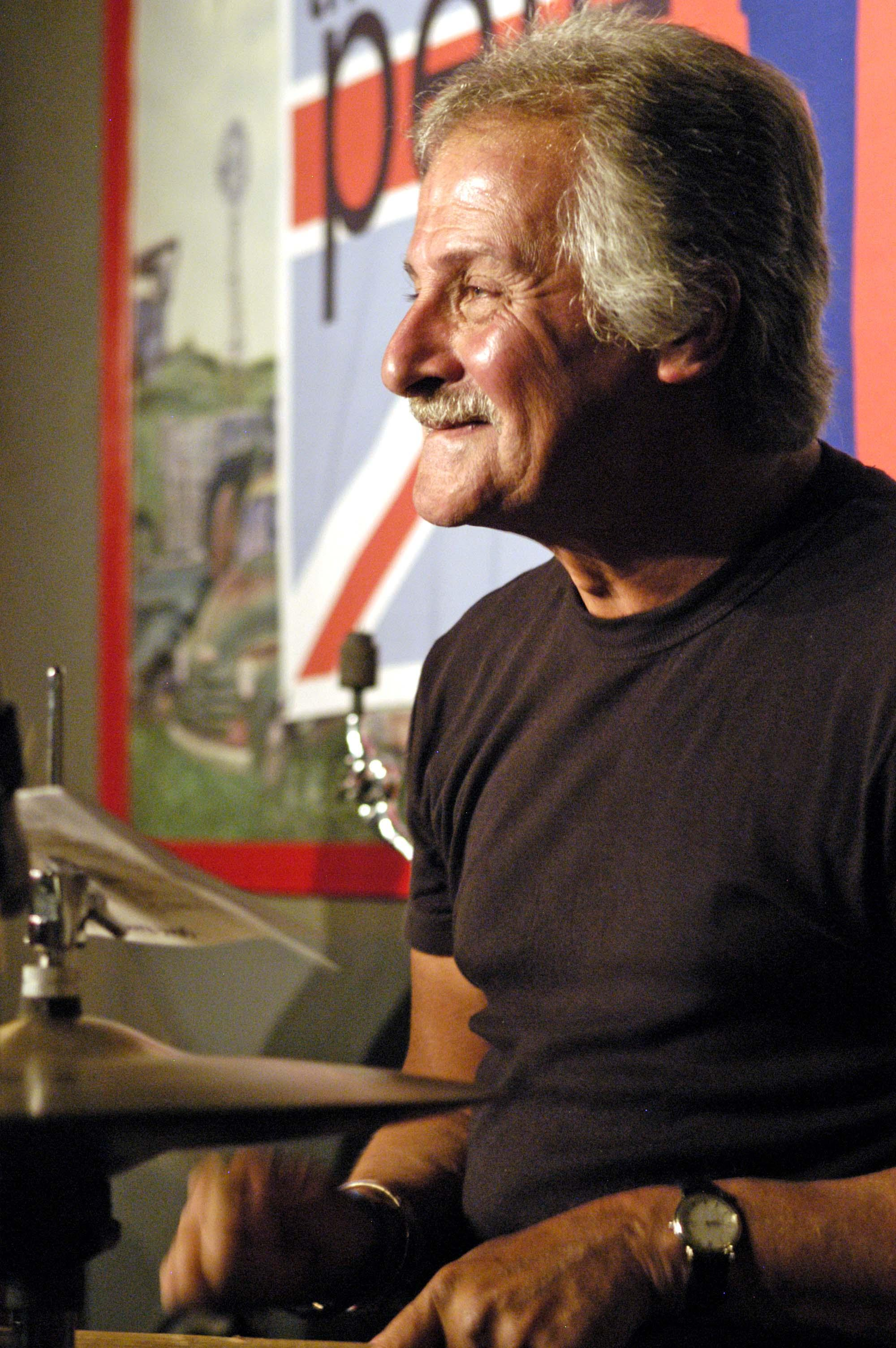
Pete Best

Stuart Sutcliffe

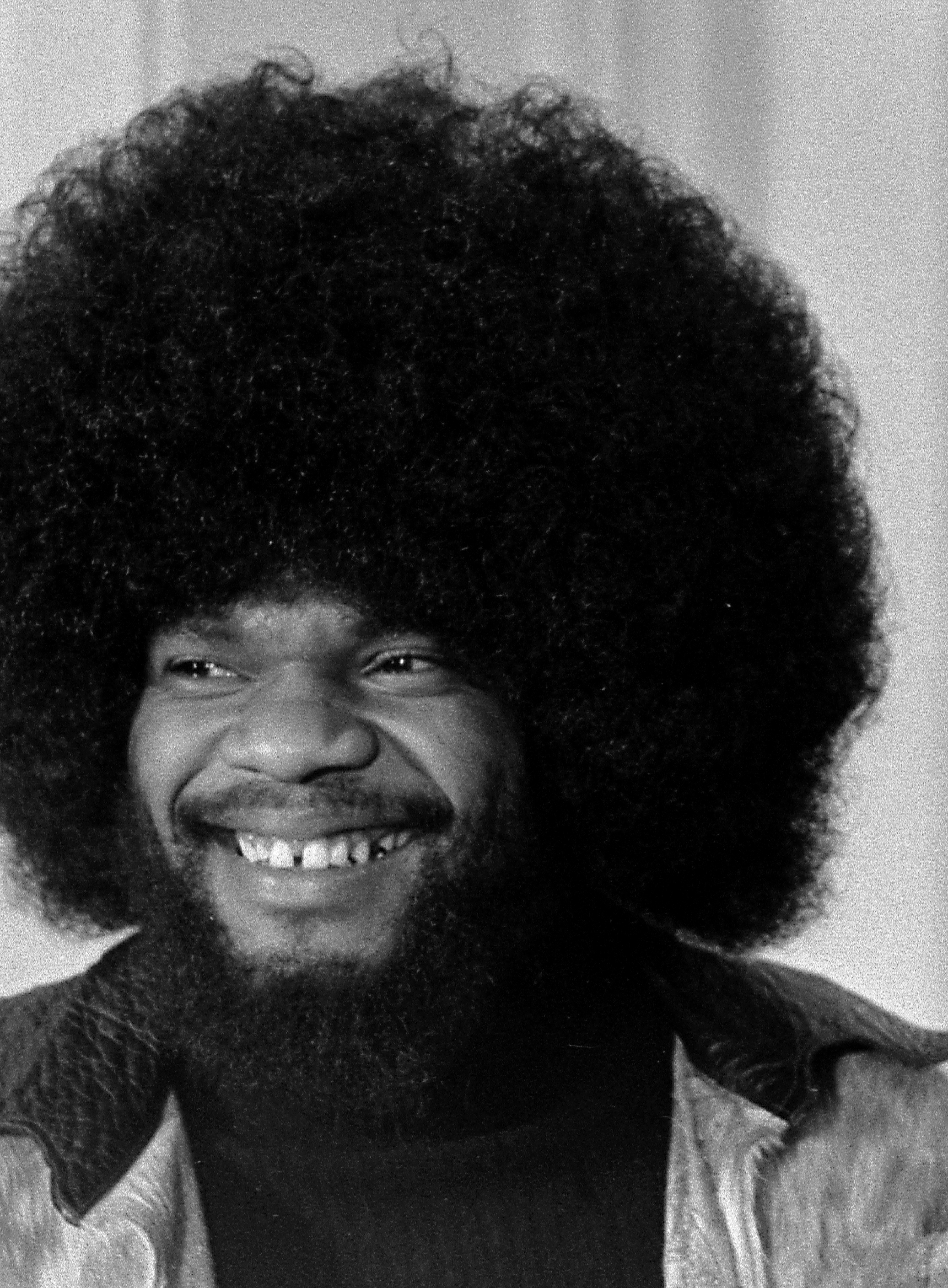
Billy Preston

Various people described as the Fifth Beatle

The fifth Beatle is an informal title that has been applied to people who were at one point a member of the Beatles or who had a strong association with John Lennon, Paul McCartney, George Harrison, and Ringo Starr. The term originated in 1964 with the American disc jockey Murray the K, who pronounced himself the "fifth Beatle" due to the amount of promotion and coverage he afforded the band on his radio programme. In the 2024 film Beatles '64, directed by David Tedeschi and produced by Martin Scorsese, Harrison is seen questioning Murray the K's original proximity to the group.

The band's members have offered their own views as to who should be described with the title. McCartney said in a 1997 interview that "if anyone was the fifth Beatle", it was manager Brian Epstein, and later applied the honorific to producer George Martin in a 2016 memorial post. Harrison said at the Beatles' 1988 induction into the Rock and Roll Hall of Fame that there were only two "fifth Beatles": Derek Taylor, the Beatles' public relations manager, and Neil Aspinall, their road manager-turned-business-executive. Other "fifth Beatles" include their early drummer Pete Best, original bassist Stuart Sutcliffe, and keyboardist Billy Preston.

== Early group members ==
Though best-known as a four-man ensemble, The Beatles were in their early career a quintet.

=== Stuart Sutcliffe ===
Stuart Sutcliffe was the original bassist of the five-member Beatles. He played with the band primarily during their days as a club act in Hamburg, West Germany. When the band returned to Liverpool in 1961, Sutcliffe remained behind in Hamburg. He died of a brain hemorrhage shortly thereafter. Instead of replacing him with a new member, Paul McCartney changed from rhythm guitar (with Lennon) to bass and the band continued as a four-piece.

Sutcliffe was an accomplished painter, but when compared to those of the other Beatles, his musical skills were described as "inadequate", and his involvement in the band was mainly a consequence of his friendship with Lennon. Sutcliffe's input was an important early influence on the development of the band's image; Sutcliffe was the first to wear what later became famous as the Beatles' moptop hairstyle, asking his girlfriend Astrid Kirchherr to cut his hair in emulation of the hairdo worn by friend Klaus Voormann.

=== Pete Best ===
Pete Best was an early drummer of the Beatles. He played with the band during their time as a club act in Liverpool and Hamburg, alongside bassist Sutcliffe and guitarists McCartney, Harrison, and Lennon. In August 1962, the band fired Best and replaced him with Ringo Starr. The first official Beatles release to include performances by Best was Anthology 1 in 1995, whereupon he said, "Lots of people have laid claim to being the fifth Beatle. I was the fourth, and now I'm getting the credit for it."

== Temporary members ==
=== Chas Newby ===
When the Beatles returned from West Germany for the first time in 1960, they were short a bass guitarist. Pete Best suggested Chas Newby, who had been in Best's previous group, the Black Jacks. Newby was attending university, but was on holiday and agreed to play with the Beatles. He appeared with them for four engagements in December 1960 (17 December, Casbah Club, Liverpool; 24 December, Grosvenor Ballroom, Liscard; 27 December, Litherland Town Hall; 31 December, Casbah Club). Lennon asked him to go to West Germany for the Beatles' second trip, but he chose to return to university and after Lennon and Harrison both declined to switch to bass guitar, McCartney, who previously played guitar and piano, reluctantly became the band's bassist.

=== Jimmie Nicol ===
Jimmie Nicol played drums for the first eight shows of The Beatles' 1964 world tour. Starr became ill and the opening part of the tour was almost cancelled. Instead of cancelling, the Beatles' manager Brian Epstein hired Nicol to stand in until Starr recovered. Nicol played with the band in early June, in Denmark, the Netherlands, Hong Kong and Australia. Nicol made the most of his time, signing autographs and giving interviews. Starr rejoined the band on 14 June, in Melbourne.

== Business, management, and production ==
=== Brian Epstein ===
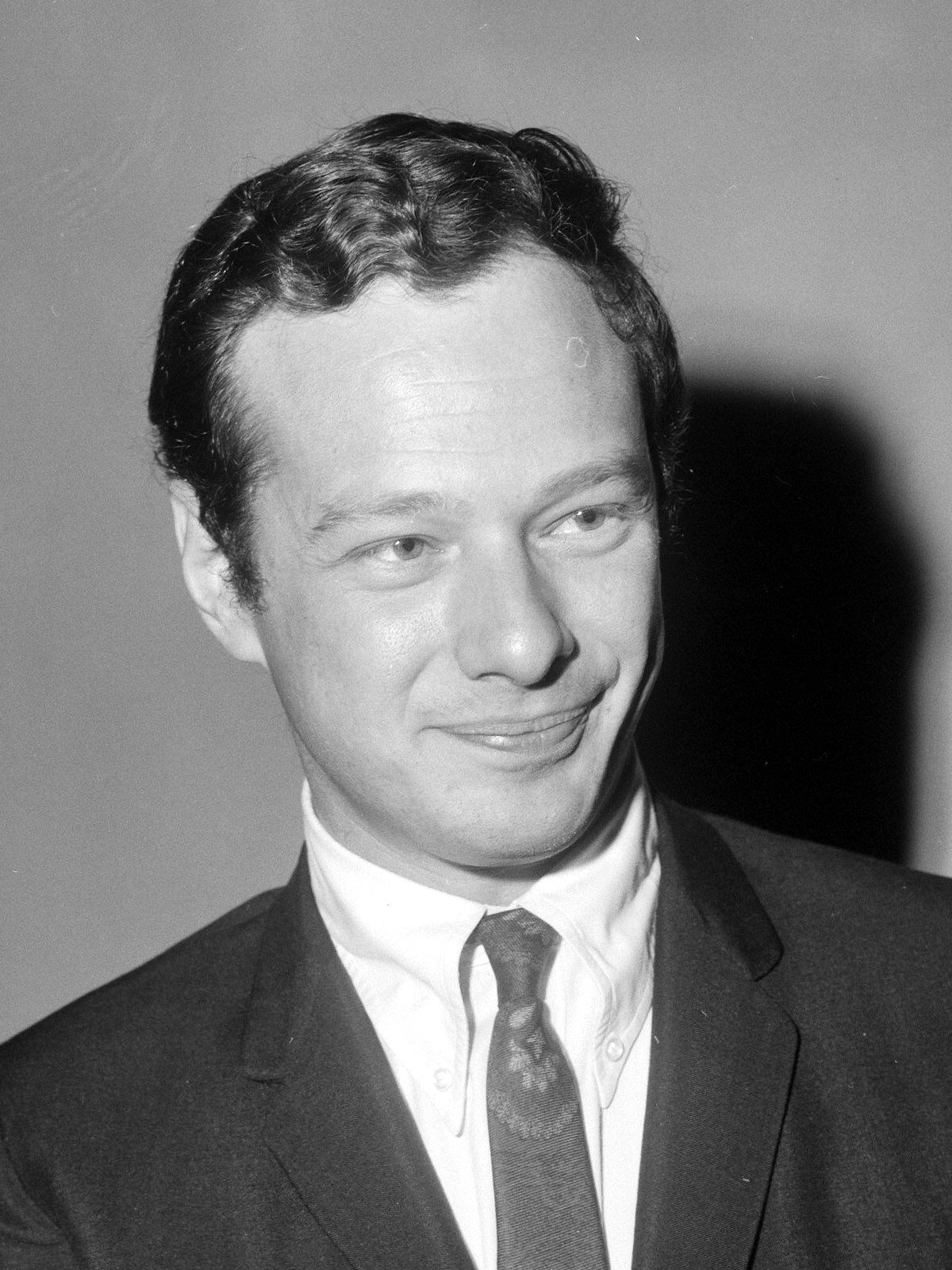
Brian Epstein

Brian Epstein, the band's manager from 1961 until his death in 1967, was instrumental in the Beatles' rise to global fame. Epstein "discovered" the band in Liverpool, saw their potential, and never wavered in his faith and commitment to them. He purposefully restricted his oversight of the band, limiting himself to business matters and public image, and gave the band free creative rein in their music. Epstein also doggedly sought a recording contract for the band in London at a crucial moment in their career, fighting their perception as provincial "northern" musicians.

Epstein's death in essence marked the beginning of the Beatles' dissolution, as Lennon admitted later. Because he was not creatively involved with the band, Epstein was only infrequently called the "fifth Beatle", but over the years he and producer George Martin have been recognised as the two inner-circle members who most profoundly affected the band's career. In an interview in the 1990s describing Epstein's involvement in the band's rise to fame, Martin declared, "He's the fifth Beatle, if there ever was one."

When the Beatles were awarded their MBEs in 1965, Harrison said that a fifth medal should be given to Epstein since "MBE really stands for 'Mr Brian Epstein'". McCartney summarised the importance of Epstein to the Beatles when he was interviewed in 1997 for a BBC documentary about Epstein. He stated: "If anyone was the fifth Beatle, it was Brian."

In 2013 Epstein was the subject of a graphic novel entitled The Fifth Beatle by Vivek Tiwary. The book was released in November and spent several weeks on The New York Times Best Seller list, reaching no. 1 in its third week of release.

=== George Martin ===
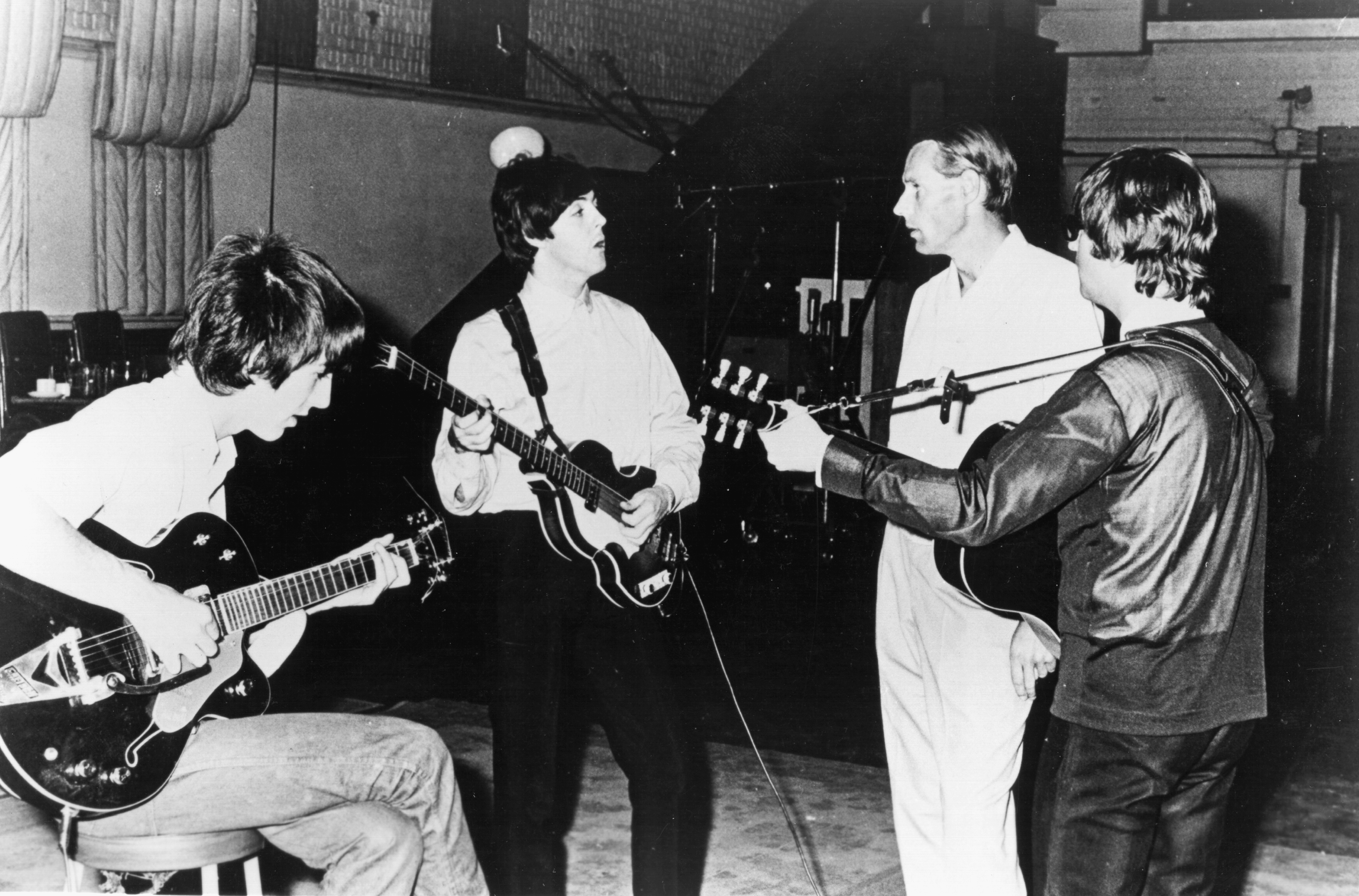
George Martin (second-right) working with the Beatles

George Martin produced nearly all of the Beatles' recordings (except for the Let It Be album, produced by Phil Spector, the songs "Real Love" and "Free as a Bird", produced by Jeff Lynne and "Now and Then", produced by his son Giles Martin) and wrote the instrumental score for the Yellow Submarine film and soundtrack album, and the string and horn (and even some vocal) arrangements for almost all of their songs (with the famous exception of Spector's re-production on Let It Be, and "She's Leaving Home", which was arranged by Mike Leander). His arrangement of the string octet backing for "Eleanor Rigby" was widely noted.

Martin's extensive musical training (which he received at the Guildhall School of Music) and sophisticated guidance in the studio are often credited as fundamental contributions to the work of the Beatles. Writer Ian MacDonald noted that Martin was one of the few record producers in the UK at the time who possessed the sensitivity the Beatles needed to develop their songwriting and recording talent. Martin's piano playing also appears on several of their tracks, including "Misery" and "In My Life".

Lennon disparaged Martin's importance to the Beatles' music. In his 1970 interview with Jann Wenner, Lennon said that music publisher Dick James is "another one of those people, who think they made us. They didn't. I'd like to hear Dick James' music and I'd like to hear George Martin's music, please, just play me some." In a 1971 letter to Paul McCartney, Lennon wrote, "When people ask me questions about 'What did George Martin really do for you?,' I have only one answer, 'What does he do now?' I noticed you had no answer for that! It's not a putdown, it's the truth." Lennon wrote that Martin took too much credit for the Beatles' music. Commenting on "Revolution 9", Lennon said, "For Martin to state that he was 'painting a sound picture' is pure hallucination. Ask any of the other people involved. The final editing Yoko and I did alone."

In a tribute to Martin after his death, McCartney said "If anyone earned the title of the fifth Beatle, it was George. From the day that he gave The Beatles our first recording contract, to the last time I saw him, he was the most generous, intelligent and musical person I've ever had the pleasure to know." Julian Lennon called him "The Fifth Beatle, without question".

=== Neil Aspinall ===
A schoolmate of McCartney and Harrison and a close personal friend of Pete Best (he actually lived in Best's house and fathered his youngest brother, Roag), Aspinall joined the Beatles as their road manager, which included driving his old Commer van to and from shows, both day and night. After Mal Evans started work for the Beatles, Aspinall was promoted to become their personal assistant, and eventually ascended to the position of CEO for Apple Corps (a position he held until 10 April 2007).

Aspinall was involved in court cases on behalf of Apple over the years (including cases against the Beatles' then-manager Allen Klein, their label EMI, and the case against Apple Computer). He supervised the marketing of music, videos, and merchandising for the group. Aspinall also temporarily served as the group's manager following Epstein's death.

Although not a musician, Aspinall also made minor contributions to a handful of Beatles' recordings. He played a tambura on "Within You Without You", harmonica on "Being for the Benefit of Mr. Kite!", some percussion on "Magical Mystery Tour", and was among the many participants singing on the chorus of "Yellow Submarine". In January 1988, while accepting the Beatles' induction into the Rock and Roll Hall of Fame, Harrison named Aspinall as one of only two people worthy of the title "the Fifth Beatle", the other being Derek Taylor.

=== Derek Taylor ===
Daily Express journalist Derek Taylor first met the band after reviewing their stage performance. Instead of the anticipated negative review of a rock-n-roll group, Taylor gave their act the highest praises. Invited to become acquainted with the Beatles' camp, he soon became a confidant, and gained his share of exclusives on them.

Eventually, he was hired away from his newspaper job by Epstein, who put him in charge of Beatles press releases, and playing media liaison to himself and the band. He also became Epstein's personal assistant.

By 1968, he became press officer for Apple Corps. As a VIP at Apple, Taylor had a major role in the company's ups and downs, making or enforcing many crucial business and personal decisions, for the Beatles and Apple's staff, and witnessing many key moments in the latter days of both. In January 1988, while accepting the Beatles' induction into the Rock and Roll Hall of Fame, Harrison named Taylor as one of only two people worthy of the title "the Fifth Beatle", the other being Neil Aspinall.

== Musical contributors ==
During the Beatles' existence (specifically, 1960–70 and the Anthology project), several musicians recorded with the Beatles in a more limited capacity, either on a Beatles' album, or on another artist's album with two or more Beatles members appearing. Hence, such artists could be dubbed "the Fifth Beatle" for a single track or two. Artists include:

=== Tony Sheridan ===
Tony Sheridan employed various backup bands while performing in Hamburg between 1960 and 1963. In 1961 the Beatles (comprising Lennon, McCartney, Harrison, and Best), who had met Sheridan during their first visit to Hamburg in 1960, worked with him on their second. When German Polydor agent Bert Kaempfert saw the pairing on stage, he suggested that they make some recordings together. At that period, Sheridan was the bigger name, with the Beatles as his backing band. In 1962, after a series of singles (the first of which, "My Bonnie"/"The Saints" made it to no. 5 in the Hit Parade, Polydor released the album My Bonnie across Germany. The word "Beatles" was judged to sound too similar to the German "Pidels" (pronounced peedles), the plural of a slang term for penis, so the album was credited to "Tony Sheridan and The Beat Brothers". After The Beatles had gained fame, the album was re-released in the UK, with the credit altered to "Tony Sheridan and The Beatles".

=== Andy White ===
Andy White played drums on the US pressing of "Love Me Do", which was the Beatles' first single in the United States. Ron Richards, assistant producer to George Martin, was in charge of recording on 11 September 1962. In June, the band had recorded "Love Me Do" with Best, then a second time in early September with new member Starr, who had only been in the group for three weeks, before deciding to record it a third time. Richards brought experienced session drummer White in for drums on this recording, with Starr playing tambourine. White and Starr also both played percussion on "P.S. I Love You" during this session, with White on drums and Starr on maracas.

=== Billy Preston ===
Apart from Sheridan, the American pianist Billy Preston was the only artist to receive joint credit on a Beatles single, for his playing on "Get Back". On the Let It Be album where Preston's performances are used the song credits list "with Billy Preston". Preston also played organ on "Let It Be", "Something" and "I Want You (She's So Heavy)", and Fender Rhodes electric piano on "Don't Let Me Down", "One After 909", "Dig A Pony", "I've Got a Feeling", and "Get Back". Preston first met the Beatles in 1962, but his "Fifth Beatle" claim originated in January 1969 when Harrison invited him to join them for recording sessions in order to defuse tensions in the band. Lennon suggested that Preston join the Beatles, even using the term "Fifth Beatle", but the idea was dismissed by McCartney. To distinguish Preston from the controversy over who is the Fifth Beatle, he is sometimes given the unique title of the "Black Beatle".

== Others ==
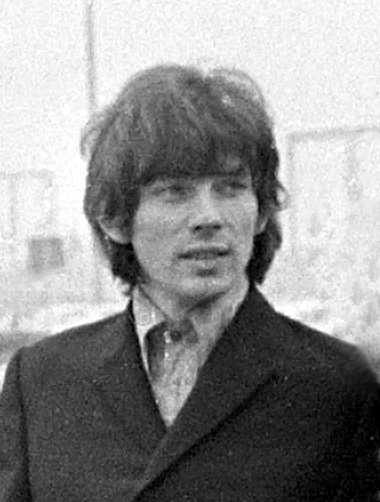
Klaus Voormann, 1967

- Klaus Voormann played bass with the Beatles in the Hamburg clubs after Stu Sutcliffe left to return to art school in Hamburg. Voormann also designed the album cover for Revolver. When McCartney left during the break-up, Voormann was mooted as a replacement. After the break-up and until 1976, Voormann played on almost every solo album recorded by Lennon, Harrison and Starr.
- Like Voormann and Preston, American drummer Jim Keltner was considered to be a potential "Fifth Beatle" during the 1970s. After playing drums on Lennon's Imagine album in 1971, Keltner performed (beside Starr) at Harrison's Concert for Bangladesh and went on to play on many albums by the former members for the next two decades, forming a lifelong friendship with Harrison. He was one of the "Sideburys" supporting Harrison's supergroup the Traveling Wilburys, toured as a member of Starr's first All-Starr Band in 1989, and participated in recording for Harrison's final album, Brainwashed.
- American singer-songwriter Harry Nilsson was dubbed the "American Beatle" by the Beatles' publicist, Derek Taylor. Nilsson's album Pandemonium Shadow Show included a version of "You Can't Do That" referencing seventeen other Beatles tracks. He was a longtime collaborator of the Beatles and a close friend of John Lennon and Ringo Starr. When asked at a 1968 press conference who their favorite contemporary artists were, Lennon and McCartney both replied "Nilsson".

== In popular culture ==
- Murray the K, a New York disc-jockey, was the first person to be called by that term. He was supposedly jokingly dubbed the "fifth Beatle" by George Harrison. However, in the movie Beatles '64, directed by David Tedeschi and produced by Martin Scorsese, in a later interview, Harrison questions how Murray the K gained access to the band at all.
- Footballer George Best was dubbed "The Fifth Beatle", or "O Quinto Beatle", by the Portuguese press after scoring twice for Manchester United in a 5–1 victory at Estádio da Luz against Benfica in the 1965–66 European Cup quarter-finals, mainly due to his Beatles-style "mop" haircut. Best was catapulted to superstar status and arriving back in England the press dubbed him "El Beatle".
- Liverpudlian comedian Jimmy Tarbuck – who was a schoolmate of John Lennon's – was referred to jokingly as the Fifth Beatle, as he became famous at around the same time, emulated their hairstyle and clothes, and had the same type of accent.
- In one skit during the 11 February 1984 episode of Saturday Night Live, Eddie Murphy played Clarence Walker, a disgruntled saxophonist who claimed to have been the fifth Beatle before being kicked out of the band by the other members in 1963.
- In The Simpsons episode "Lisa the Vegetarian", Apu is revealed to be an old friend of guest stars Paul and Linda McCartney while being their guide during their 1968 trip to India and boastingly claims that he was once known as the "fifth Beatle", to which Paul sarcastically replies: "Sure you were, Apu," while rolling his eyes.
