= Tundra (disambiguation) =

Tundra is a treeless region near the poles of the Earth or at high elevations.

Tundra may refer to:

== Transportation ==
- Toyota Tundra, A full-size pickup truck manufactured by Toyota since May 1999
- Volvo Tundra, a 1979 concept car
- Joplin Tundra, ultralight aircraft
- Dream Tundra, kit aircraft

== Science and Technology ==
- Tundra (satellite), a type of Russian military satellites
- Tundra orbit, a highly elliptical, highly inclined geosynchronous orbit
- Tundra Semiconductor, a semiconductor company in Canada

== Entertainment ==
=== Literature ===
- Tundra Books, a Canadian children's book publisher
- Tundra Publishing, a defunct American comic book publisher
- Tundra (comic strip), a comic strip by Chad Carpenter
- Tundra (Marvel Comics), one of the Great Beasts supervillains featured in the Marvel Comics series Alpha Flight

=== Film ===
- Tundra (1936 film), American film directed by Norman Dawn
- Tundra (2021 film), Cuban film directed by José Luis Aparicio

=== Other entertainment ===
- "The Mighty Boosh (series 1)" contains an episode named "Tundra"
- Tundra (musician) (born 1975), a musician from Norway
- Tundra (Anneli Drecker album)
- Tundra (Tungsten album), 2020
- "Tundra", a song by Squarepusher from the 1996 album Feed Me Weird Things
