= The Mice Templar =

- Cover of the first issue.

Publication information
- Publisher: Image Comics
- Schedule: Bi-Monthly
- Publication date: September 2007 – November 2015
- No. of issues: 39

Creative team
- Written by: Bryan J. L. Glass
- Artist(s): Michael Avon Oeming: Vol. 1 Victor Santos: Vol. 2-4
- Letterer: James H. Glass
- Colorist(s): Wil Quintana: Vol. 1 Veronica Gandini: Vol. 2-4
- Editor: Judy Glass

Collected editions
- Volume 1: The Prophecy: ISBN 1-60706-127-9

The Mice Templar is an American comic book series created by Bryan J. L. Glass, and Michael Avon Oeming that is published by Image Comics. The series is an anthropomorphic fantasy tale that follows the struggles of a small group of mice against an evil tyrant king.

The series has been published in four story arcs. Volume 1 consisted of 6 issues; 2, 9; 3, 8; 4, 14; and the fifth and final volume was 5 issues.

Volume One featured art by co-creator Michael Avon Oeming. Beginning with Volume Two, Victor Santos took over the art duties.

In 2008, a CG-animated adaptation from Cartoon Network was announced but was later scrapped.

== Plot synopsis ==
After the fall of the Templar order on the Field of Avalon a great evil has risen in the land. After many seasons of tyranny by King Icarus a long ago prophecy appears to be in the process of fulfilling itself. The young mouse, Karic, has been visited by the gods of the realm and could possibly be the return of the great Kuhl-En who originally established the Templar order and brought peace to the land. Each arc in the series is a stepping stone to Karic's growth as the main hero of the story and the challenges he faces along the way. The final arc, Legend, has Karic caught between two warring factions, each wanting him for their own purpose and willing to kill him if he chooses the opposing side.

== Legends and lore ==
- Wotan – God above gods, and creator of all things. Seemingly is aloof and distant, watching over all from his two great eyes in the heavens. Wotan is thought to have used Kuhl-En in the past, and possibly Karic in the present to bring about peace in his creation. His eyes appear as the sun and moon, each keeping watch over their respective halves of the entire day/night succession. Templar doctrine teaches that Wotan chose mice, instead of any other creatures, to be his mediators of order amidst the chaos of the world specifically because they were the smallest and weakest of the sentient races; by empowering the weakest, he reveals his strength, wisdom and compassion to all.
- Ancient Days – The time before mouse sentience and recorded history; when the Great Eye of Wotan split into two, followed by the rebellion of the Firstborn Nathair that started the Cycles of Chaos. It is first referenced in volume one issue two.
- Nathair – Also called the Firstborn. Thought to be legend as they are purported to have lived during the Ancient Days, when they despised the Eyes of Wotan. Under the leadership of Donas, they constructed the Great Catapult of Dubhlan, the "Defiant", to blot out the two suns so that they might rule over all creatures in the resulting darkness that would cover the world. Their efforts only dimmed one Great Eye, and thus were they cursed by Wotan and banished to the Outer Darkness. Their legacy of defiance is now considered the origin of all evil that followed, of any race or individual that seeks to conquer and enslave others for their own benefit. First reference as a race is in volume one issue two.
- Great Death Owl – The Emissary of Wotan, said to usher living souls back to their creator. Kuhl-En is said to have wrestled it for forty days and nights upon the Peak of Armagh, until snapping one of its claws off to fashion his own weapon, the Mark of Kuhl-En. It is believed that the beating of its mighty wings creates the wind itself, which blows patterns in the wheat of the Fields of Gold, where the Readers of the Wheat interpret the Will of Wotan from the height of the Great Ash Tree.
- Kuhl-En – The warrior-priest whose philosophies of protecting the weak and innocent led to the establishment of the Templar Order. Legend says that Kuhl-En wrestled with the Great Death Owl for forty days and forty nights before claiming one of its claws and making his own weapon known as the Mark of Kuhl-En.

== Significant locations ==
- Cricket's Glen - Karic's hometown. Karic grew up in this small village learning of the tales of the Templar from the village blacksmith, Deishun. In the first issue of the series the village was destroyed by a rat army, and many of the inhabitants were taken captive. Cricket's Glen was introduced and destroyed in volume one issue one.
- Dealrach Ard-Vale - Also known as the Shining City is the capital of the mouse kingdom and holds the palace of King Icarus. It is also home to the rat army and the Druids. The druids serve the evil Nathair and use their influence over King Icarus to control the kingdom.
- Avalon - Also known as the Field of Avalon or the Field of Ruin. This once sacred area holds the Tree of Grace where the final battle in the civil war of the two Templar factions was fought. The battle led to the Templar order having to go into hiding throughout the land, and left an ongoing rift between the few remaining Templar. Avalon was first referenced in volume one issue one.
- Fields of Gold - A large field of wild wheat that surrounds the Great Ash Tree. It is from the Great Ash Tree that the Templar priesthood discern the will of Wotan through the patterns blown in the wheat. The Fields of Gold and the Great Ash tree were first introduced in volume one issue four.
- Kildre Hill - A haunted hill that serves as the home of Black Anaius. The hill is scattered with ancient idols, totems and sacrificial altars. First referenced in volume one issue four.
- Barren Lands - A large desert region also known as The Great Eastern Desert, it is the home to the fearsome red ants known as The Many.
- Peak of Armagh - A high peak where Kuhl-En is said to have wrestled the Great Death Owl of Wotan for forty days and nights until breaking off one of its talons to become his weapon, the Mark of Kuhl-En. It is first referenced in volume one issue two.

== Characters ==
- Karic – the main character, a young mouse separated from his family. Now training to become the liberator of the Dark Lands under the Templar.
- Leito – a young Templar in training.
- Mornae – Karic's mother.
- Cassius – Karic's mentor.
- Pilot – Karic's former mentor. In actuality a traitor to the Templar selling out his brothers to the rats. After being left for dead, he's saved by Karic. Pilot then takes advantage of Karic's calling for his own gain. His scheme is then thwarted by Cassius and afterwards is kidnapped by the Bats Of Maeve. He's later revealed to be alive in the second arc working for the Bats as an emissary to offer Icarus an alliance to stop Karic. But Icarus sentences Pilot to the dungeon where he befriends Leito. Taking advantage of the boy's grief, he manipulates him into believing Karic is a false liberator, using his friend's name. Pilot is implied to have Leito kill Karic, so he can take over the Templar, with Leito as his puppet. The plan backfires, when Leito realizes Karic is actually his childhood friend. Pilot attempts to run, but is cornered by Cassius, who kills him.
- Master Deishun – a blacksmith, former Templar, and Leito's master and uncle.
- Black Anaius – mouse druid-witch and servant of Donas who dwells hidden in the forest.
- King Icarus – evil mouse king revealed to have been a bat in disguise.
- Lady Lorelie – King Icarus's royal consort.
- Captain Tosk – captain of the Rat army and son of the Druid High Priest. After attempting to trick his father into thinking he slayed a Templar, he has his hand cut off. Boris the royal torturer salvages what's left and gifts him an iron gauntlet. Tosk served as the leader of the raid that destroyed Cricket's Glen, Karic and Leito's hometown. Where he and his soldiers killed Deishun and cuts off Leito's arm. He reappears in the third arc, where he quells a civil war between the Rat army and the Weasel royal guard. His last appearance is in Legend where he confronts Leito and Pilot and after having both of his arms cut off the former, Tosk has his throat slit by Pilot.

== Collected editions ==
The series was collected into several trade paperbacks:

- Volume 1: The Prophecy (collects issues #1-6, 216 pages, Image Comics, paperback, July 2009, ISBN 1-60706-127-9)
- Volume 2.1: Destiny Part 1 (collects issues #1-5, 208 pages, Image Comics, paperback, August 2010, ISBN 1-60706-284-4)
- Volume 2.2: Destiny Part 2 (collects issues #6-9, 200 pages, Image Comics, paperback, November 2010, ISBN 1-60706-313-1)
- Volume 3: A Midwinter Night's Dream (collects 8 issues, 336 pages, Image Comics, paperback, March 2013, ISBN 1-60706-651-3)
- Volume 4.1: Legend (collects #1-8, 304 pages, Image Comics, paperback, March 2014, ISBN 1-60706-857-5)
- Volume 4.2: Legend Part 2 (collects #9-14, 248 pages, Image Comics, paperback, December 2014, ISBN 1-63215-198-7)
- Volume 5: Night's End (collects #1-5, 240 pages, Image Comics, paperback, November 2016, ISBN 1-63215-551-6)

== Awards ==
Writer Bryan J. L. Glass won the Harvey Award in 2009 for Best New Talent for his work on The Mice Templar. The Mice Templar won the Harvey Award in 2010 for Best Graphic Album of Previously Published Work.
