= Alaska State Trooper Academy =

Coordinates: 57.053°N 135.319°W

The Alaska State Trooper Academy is located in Sitka, Alaska, and trains Alaska State Troopers as well as other types of law enforcement personnel. It is technically known as the Alaska Department of Public Safety Training Academy and also the DPS Academy. In addition to state troopers, it trains municipal police officers, state park rangers, fire marshals, and Village public safety officers (VPSOs).

== Staff ==
The DPS Academy is typically commanded by a state trooper lieutenant, with a state trooper sergeant serving as the deputy commander. There are generally four to six state trooper corporals who serve as staff instructors. There are four civilian, non-commissioned, employees who perform administrative, logistical, and maintenance duties.

== Training ==
The initial phase of a trooper recruit's academy training is known as the Alaska Law Enforcement Training program, or ALET. The ALET program is a residential, para-military style training program lasting approximately 16 weeks. The students attending an ALET class are a mixture of state trooper recruits, municipal and airport police officers, state park rangers, village public safety officers, state fire marshals, and self paying recruits. All of these students receive the same course of instruction, regardless of which agency employs them.

Below is a listing of some of the subjects that make up the ALET curriculum:

- Constitutional and procedural law
- Search and seizure laws
- Alaska Criminal Code
- Officer safety skills
- Traffic laws
- Emergency vehicle operations
- Crash investigation
- Handgun training
- Liquor laws
- Juvenile laws and procedures
- First aid and CPR
- Report writing
- Traffic stops
- Shotgun training
- Patrol rifle training
- Building searches
- Crime scene investigations
- Interviewing techniques
- DUI enforcement
- Domestic violence crimes
- Sexual assault investigations
- Health and fitness
- Verbal communications
- Radio procedures
- Personal defensive tactics

In addition to the above subjects, ALET students also participate in daily physical fitness activities which may include strength training, running, and swimming. The ALET program uses a series of written tests and scenario-based exercises to measure the academic and practical performance of its students.

=== Trooper-specific training ===
The ALET graduation ceremonies mark the end of academy training for all municipal officers, fire marshals, and park rangers. While these students get to go home, state trooper recruits stay at the academy for two more weeks of training. This period of instruction, known as the Trooper Basic Course, involves classes that are tailored to the specific expectations and duties of Alaska State Troopers. Among the classes taught are:

- Department history
- Department policies and procedures
- Wildlife Regulations and Investigation
- Wilderness survival
- Search and rescue management

Because the duties of Alaska State Troopers often require them to travel to remote wilderness areas in small planes, boats, or on snowmachines, each trooper recruit receives instruction in wilderness survival and cold water survival techniques. This instruction includes a three-day/two-night survival field exercise conducted on an island near Sitka. The Alaska DPS Academy is the only state law enforcement academy in the nation to provide this type of training for its recruits.

Upon graduation from the Trooper Basic Course the trooper recruits are transferred to an urban patrol unit where they will begin a 15-week-long field training program. At the conclusion of the field training program the trooper recruit is qualified to work alone, but remains on a probationary status until he or she completes one year of service.

== See also ==
- Alaska State Troopers Museum
