= The Fifth Beatle (graphic novel) =

2013 graphic novel by Vivek Tiwary, Andrew Robinson and Kyle Baker

- Date: November 2013
- Publisher: Dark Horse Comics

Creative team
- Writer: Vivek Tiwary
- Artist: Andrew Robinson; Kyle Baker

The Fifth Beatle is a graphic novel by writer Vivek Tiwary, artist Andrew Robinson, and cartoonist Kyle Baker. It debuted in Italy as part as the tenth anniversary of the country's Rolling Stone magazine and was published by Dark Horse Comics in November 2013.

== Story ==
The novel tells the true account of Brian Epstein, the manager of The Beatles, considered to be and coined as the "Fifth Beatle", so-called as he was the one who discovered the Liverpool band and was the driving force behind their worldwide success.

Although they were turned down by several record companies, Epstein believed the group would be "bigger than Elvis." To that end, Epstein seriously cleans up the band's public image, such as having them wear suits and ties as well encouraging them to continue their distinctive mop-top hairdos. So prepared, Epstein is able to masterfully promote their careers, with a major triumph being negotiating a series of headline appearances on The Ed Sullivan Show by offering to cover the band's travelling expenses and accepting an unusually low payment for the appearances, which produced spectacular publicity for the band's first American concert tour. As the group grew in popularity, Epstein struggled with his sexuality, being gay at a time when it was still criminalized, and there were few options for gay men to meet publicly, and his drug addictions. After The Beatles ceased touring in 1966, he feared about their future, and his role with the group.

== Television adaptation ==
After a film adaptation was announced in 2013, Sonar Entertainment optioned the rights to The Fifth Beatle for development as a multi-part television event series. Tiwary will pen the series adaptation and serve as executive producer. The series has also acquired rights to Beatles songs from Sony.

== Paperback edition ==
In October 2016 The Fifth Beatle: The Brian Epstein Story was released in trade paperback. The new paperback edition included new art and concept material from artist Kyle Baker.

== Reception ==
The Fifth Beatle was released and became a New York Times Best Seller. It climbed to number one in its third week. USA Today called scenes of it "touching," as well as having some "fanciful aspects."

The Fifth Beatle was named as a finalist for the prestigious 26th Annual Lambda Literary Award ("The Lammys") for "Best LGBT Graphic Novel". 2014 marks the debut of the Graphic Novel Category. On March 14, 2014 The Fifth Beatle was named a finalist in Foreword Review's 16th Annual Book of the Year Awards.

In March 2014, Andrew Robinson, artist of The Fifth Beatle, was nominated for the 68th Annual National Cartoonist Society Divisional Reuben Award for "Best Graphic Novel." On May 25, 2014 it was announced that Robinson was selected as the Reuben Award Winner for "Best Graphic Novel."

In April 2014, The Fifth Beatle received two Eisner Award nominations in the categories of Best Painter/Multimedia Artist (interior art) for Robinson and Best Reality-Based Work. On July 25, 2014, The Fifth Beatle received the Eisner Award for Best Reality-Based work.

In 2014, The Fifth Beatle was nominated for the Young Adult Library Services Association (YALSA) Award under the category "Great Graphic Novels for Teens". The winner of this award will be announced in January 2015.

The Fifth Beatle creative team, including Tiwary, Robinson and Baker, have been selected as guests at the 14th annual Library of Congress National Book Festival on August 30, 2014 in Washington, D.C. U.S. President Barack Obama and First Lady Michelle Obama were honorary chairs for the event.

In June 2014, The Fifth Beatle was nominated for a True Believers Comics Award for "Favourite 2013 Original Graphic Novel".

The Fifth Beatle was also announced as an INDIEFAB 2013 GOLD Winner for Graphic Novels & Comics.

In July 2014, The Fifth Beatle was nominated for two Harvey Awards, "Best Graphic Album - Original" and "Best Biographical, Historical, or Journalistic Presentation". On September 6, 2014 at Baltimore Comic-Con, The Fifth Beatle won two Harvey Awards for "Best Graphic Album - Original" and "Best Biographical, Historical, or Journalistic Presentation".
