= Tale of Sand =

2012 comic book

Publication information
- Publisher: Archaia Entertainment
- Publication date: January 31, 2012
- No. of issues: 1

Creative team
- Written by: Jim Henson (screenplay); Jerry Juhl
- Artist: Ramón K. Pérez
- Letterer: Deron Bennett
- Colorist: Ian Herring

Tale of Sand is a comic book based on an unmade film script by Jim Henson and Jerry Juhl.

== Development ==
Jim Henson created the idea in the mid- to late 1950s, and worked with Jerry Juhl in writing the story throughout the late '60s and early '70s.

In January 2012, the Jim Henson Company partnered with Archaia Entertainment and published a graphic novel version of Henson's and Juhl's script with artwork by Ramón Pérez. Lisa Henson was instrumental in getting the story into comic book form, in partnership with Archaia editor-in-chief Stephen Christy.

We're all really excited about this project at the company because it's rare that we have an opportunity to actually dig into the archives and find something exciting and then fall in love with it all over again and then see it be realized in a medium where the public can enjoy it - as opposed to just in a museum exhibit or something. We're finding something that was archived but realizing it's very vibrant and entertaining and relevant to today. So, it's really great because we can make it. We don't just have to study it, we can make it

— Lisa Henson

We're working very closely with Lisa and Brian Henson, his children, who are supervising this. They are very adamant about this not ever being made into a movie, or not being made into anything else, they only want to do this as a comic to almost give a storyboarded look at what this lost Jim Henson could have been like

— Stephen Christy (Archaia, editor in chief)

== Plot ==
The story is about a man called Mac who wakes up in an unknown town and is pursued across the desert for the Southwest by strange people and beasts.

== Reception ==
The comic had a mostly positive reception from critics.
