= Michael Avon Oeming =

American comic book creator

- Oeming in 2026
- Areas: Writer, Penciller, Inker
- Notable works: Powers; The Mice Templar; The Cross Bronx; Thor; Spider-Man/Red Sonja

Michael Avon Oeming is an American comic book creator, both as an artist and writer.

== Career ==
Oeming is a fan of ancient mythology, having written or drawn several projects centering on the Norse gods. He frequently collaborates with long-time friend Bryan J. L. Glass and with Brian Michael Bendis. He is part of the M.O.B. crew of comic book creators, along with David Mack, Brian Bendis and Daniel Berman.

His 1998 comic book Bulletproof Monk was made into a film of the same name.

The previous mentioned collaborations are The Mice Templar from Image Comics, which he draws and co-authors with Bryan J.L. Glass, and Powers from Icon Comics which he draws, and sometimes co-authors, with Brian Bendis. His creator-owned projects include Rapture, on which he collaborated with his wife, Taki Soma, and The Victories, both for Dark Horse Comics.

As of 2010, he was employed as a staff member of Valve, working on Left 4 Dead, Team Fortress 2 and Portal 2 webcomics.

== Personal life ==
Oeming has a son, Ethan and currently resides in Portland, Oregon with his wife, fellow writer/artist Taki Soma.

== Bibliography ==
=== Writing ===
- Bastard Samurai (script and inks, with co-author Miles Gunter and pencils by Kelsey Shannon, 3-issue limited series, Image Comics, April – August 2002)
- Thor #80-85: "Ragnarok" (with co-author Daniel Berman and art by Andrea Di Vito, Marvel Comics, August – December 2004, tpb, December 2004, ISBN 0-7851-1599-4)
- Stormbreaker: The Saga of Beta Ray Bill (with co-author Daniel Berman and art by Andrea Di Vito, Marvel Comics, 6-issue limited series, January – June, 2005)
- Thor: Blood Oath (with art by Scott Kolins, 6-issue limited series, Marvel Comics, September – December 2005)
- Ares (with pencils by Travel Foreman, 5-issue limited series, Marvel Comics, March – July 2006, tpb, ISBN 978-0-7851-1991-3)
- Chaos War: Ares (with pencils by Stephen Segovia and Carlos Rodriguez, one-shot, Marvel Comics, December 2010)
- Omega Flight (with pencils by Scott Kolins, 5-issue limited series, Marvel Comics, June – October 2007)
- Highlander (with co-author Brandon Jerwa and art by Lee Moder, 4-issue limited series, Dynamite Entertainment, July 2006 – February 2007)
- Wings of Anansi
- Blood River (co-writer with Daniel Berman)
- Quixote: A modern-day retelling of Don Quixote (co-writer with Bryan Glass)
- Red Sonja
- Six (co-written with Daniel Berman)
- Spider-Man/Red Sonja (with pencils by Mel Rubi, 5-issue limited series, Marvel Comics, August – December 2007)
- Parliament of Justice
- God Complex (co-written with Daniel Berman with art by John Broglia, 6-issue limited series, December 2009 – May 2010)
- Assassin's Creed: Mirage – A Soar of Eagless (pencils by Mirko Colak and art by Lauren Affe, 3-issue limited series, Dark Horse Comics, March – June 2025)

=== Art ===
- Judge Dredd #1-5 (with writer Andrew Helfer, DC Comics, August – December 1994)
- Atomic Robo, Image Comics
- Bastard Samurai, Image Comics
- Bluntman and Chronic, Image Comics
- B.P.R.D.: The Soul of Venice, Dark Horse Comics
- Bulletproof Monk (pencils, with writer Brett Lewis, Image Comics, 1998 – 1999, tpb, 2002, ISBN 1-58240-244-2)
- Powers (with Brian Michael Bendis, Icon Comics, 2000 – present)
- Avengers, Marvel Comics (inking)
- Daredevil, Marvel Comics (inking)
- Judge Dredd: "Straight Eye for the Crooked Guy" (with Robbie Morrison, in 2000 AD Prog 2006, December 2005)
- Parliament of Justice
- Six
- The Foot Soldiers
- What If... Thor, Marvel Comics
- The Mice Templar
- Catwoman, DC Comics
- The Team Fortress 2 web comics, up until the release of Loose Canon, when he was moved to the Left 4 Dead team.
- The Sacrifice, a webcomic based on Left 4 Dead
- Takio (with Brian Michael Bendis, 96-page graphic novel, Icon Comics, March 2011, ISBN 978-0-7851-5326-9)
- Lab Rat, based on Portal and leading up to Portal 2
- Cave Carson Has a Cybernetic Eye, DC Comics/Young Aninmal, October 2016 – September 2017
- Cave Carson Has an Interstellar Eye, DC Comics/Young Animal, March – August 2018
- Blue Book, Dark Horse Comics, 2023

=== Writing and art ===
- The Cross Bronx (co-author Ivan Brandon, 4-issue limited series, Image Comics, September – December 2006)
- Dick Tracy: Forever, IDW
- Hammer of the Gods (co-author Mark Wheatley, 5-issue limited series, Insight Studios Group, February – November 2001)
- Ship of Fools (co-author Bryan J.L. Glass, Caliber Comics)
- Space Sluts (pornographic parody of Star Wars)
- Victories

== Awards ==
- 2001 Eisner Award for Best New Series (for Powers)

=== Nominations ===
- 2001 Eisner Award for Best Penciller/Inker or Penciller/Inker Team (for Powers)
- 2006 Eagle Award for Best Comics Writer/Artist

== Notes ==
Preceded by Dan Jurgens	Thor writer 2004 (with Daniel Berman)	Succeeded by J. Michael Straczynski
