= Bryan J. L. Glass =

American comic book writer

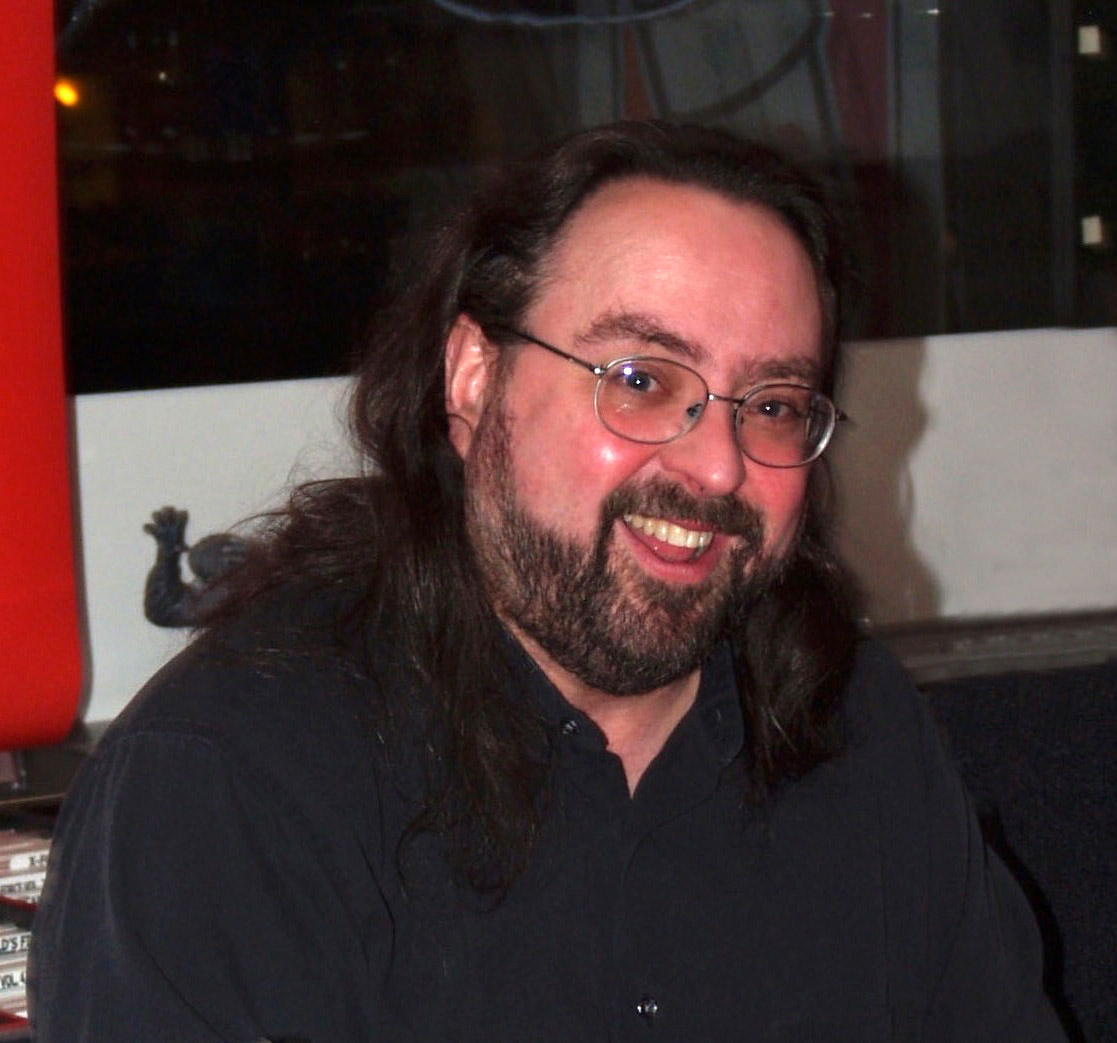
- Glass at a February 28, 2014 signing for Furious at Midtown Comics in Manhattan
- Born: Bryan Jason Lee Glass; Philadelphia, Pennsylvania, U.S.
- Occupation: Comic book writer
- Writing career
- Language: English
- Period: 1992–present
- Genres: superhero fantasy, urban fantasy
- Notable work: The Mice Templar
- Notable awards: 2 Harvey Awards
- Website: bryanjlglass.com

Bryan Jason Lee Glass is an American comic book writer, known for works such as The Mice Templar, a creator-owned series that he publishes through Image Comics, and for which he won two Harvey Awards. He has also written books for Marvel Comics, including Thor: First Thunder and Valkyrie.

== Early life ==
Bryan Jason Lee Glass was born and raised with his two siblings in a Philadelphia blue-collar neighborhood called Fishtown. Although Fishtown was a neighborhood that Glass says provided many opportunities for delinquency, Glass credits the influence of his father, Harry Lee Glass, for providing positive examples and instilling in him a sense of responsibility. Having enjoyed singing and playing the saxophone himself in his youth, Harry was supportive of Bryan and his two siblings, all of whom were driven towards the arts, even allowing Glass to work as a stunt driver in a student film. Glass was an avid reader of Marvel Comics during the 1970s and 1980s.

== Technique and habits ==
Glass works in a second-story room in his home that is lined with bookshelves of CDs, DVDs and Blu-rays, as well as three paintings that he finds inspirational: Gottfried Helnwein's Boulevard of Broken Dreams; Robert Heindel's Les Miserables; and the poster for the 2003 film version of Peter Pan. Glass says he finds the latter's image of the hero appearing small yet undaunted when facing a dark pirate ship looming out of the unknown to be a metaphor for life and how he chooses to face the unexpected. During warm weather, Glass prefers to work on the back deck of his home in a screened-in porch that features a better view and a comfortable breeze. Although his neighborhood is quiet, Glass prefers to fill the silence with what he calls "Musical Muse" — an alphabetical cycling through his collection of motion picture, Broadway, television, and video game orchestral and electronic scores.

== "Area 51 Caller" ==
Glass has, along with many other individuals, claimed to be the person responsible for the infamous 'Area 51' call to the Coast to Coast AM radio program on September 11 of 1997, then hosted by Art Bell. With the show's theme being 'Former employees of Area 51 invited to call in', the actual caller declared himself to be a former employee of Area 51. The caller, in a frantic tone, said that he had been "running across the country" after being medically discharged from Area 51 and that the authorities were close to catching up to him. He went on to claim that the government was aware of specific information regarding upcoming natural disasters and not informing or preparing the public, in addition to the revelation that a 'precursor' to NASA made contact with malevolent extra-dimensional beings who had since infiltrated our government and military establishments within the US and were planning to demolish major population centers to more easily control the rest of the world. In the middle of the caller's tirade, the radio network's satellite feed legitimately malfunctioned, resulting in a few seconds of dead airtime before the backup systems took over. Thus the call was lost and never completed/retrieved as the malfunction cut off all transmission from Bell's program.

Glass also claims that he called back into the show on April 28, 1998 and confessed to the incident as being a joke that went too far, and even did a partial reenactment of the original call. Many doubt the authenticity of his reenactment of the call and his claims regarding himself as the caller.

On September 9, 2014, Glass was a guest on FADE to BLACK, where he detailed the supposed inspiration for the call 17 years earlier, though to this day he has no proof or way of proving that he was the original caller, or explanation for the loss of Satellite Transmission during the original call.

== Awards ==
- 2009 Harvey Award for Best New Talent, for The Mice Templar
- 2010 Harvey Award for Best Graphic Album of Previously Published Work, for Mice Templar, Volume 1

== Bibliography ==
- Quixote: A Novel (illustrated by Michael Avon Oeming) (2005) Image Comics
- Ship of Fools (co-written with Michael Avon Oeming, 1996, Caliber Comics)
- 86 Voltz: The Dead Girl (2005) Image Comics
- The Mice Templar (2007–present) Image Comics
- Riftwar (2011) Marvel Comics
- Thor: First Thunder (2010) Marvel Comics
- Valkyrie (2010) Marvel Comics
