= Vivek Tiwary =

American theatre director (born 1973)

Vivek J. Tiwary
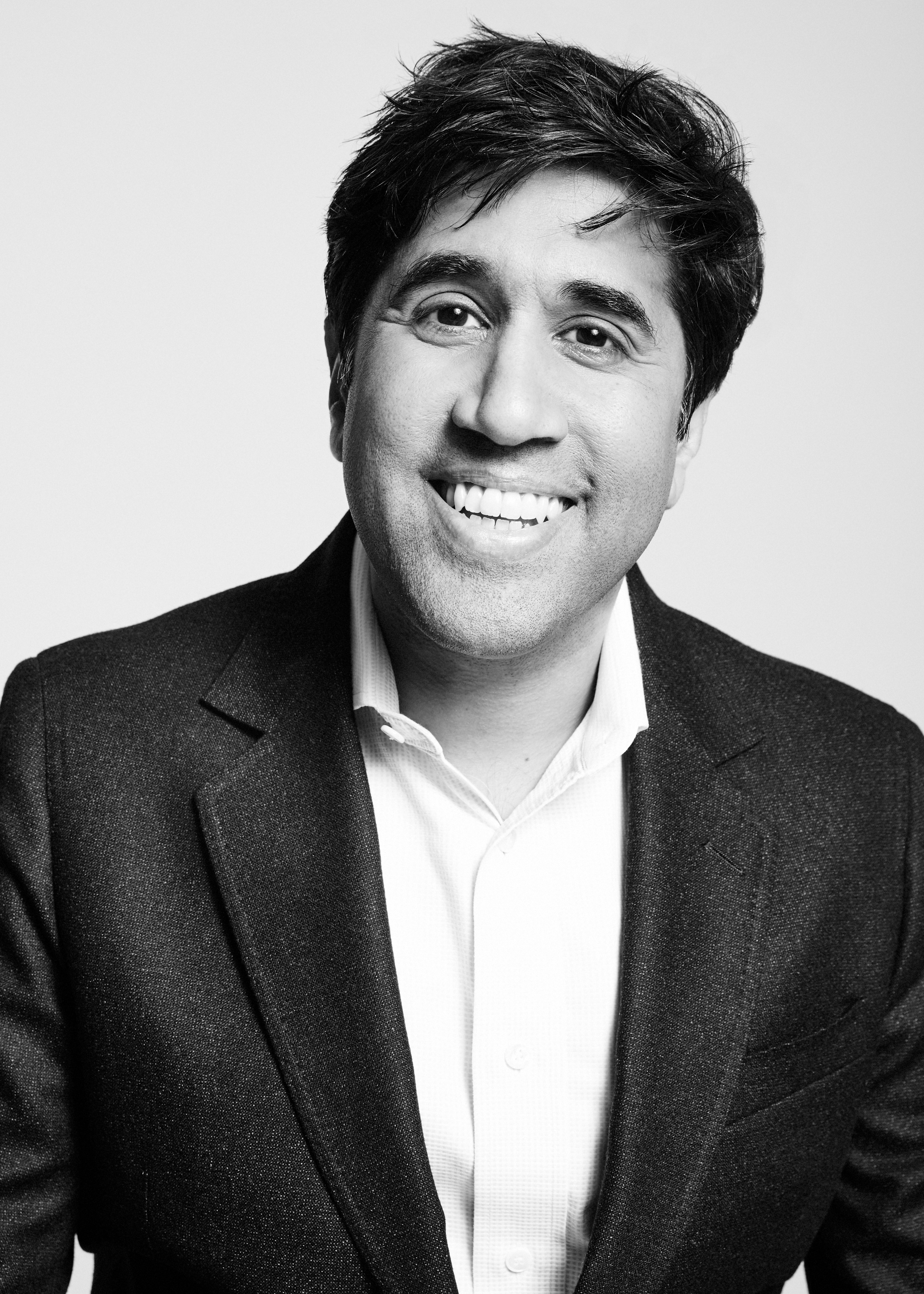
- Tiwary at the 2014; Chicago Comic & Entertainment Expo
- Born: May 15, 1973 (age 53); New York, New York, U.S.
- Education: University of Pennsylvania
- Occupations: Author, theater producer

Vivek J. Tiwary (born May 15, 1973) is an American author and theater producer.

== Early life ==
Vivek J. Tiwary was born in New York City to immigrant parents from India. He graduated from New York's Collegiate School high school and, in 1996, from the University of Pennsylvania, magna cum laude, with undergraduate degrees from both the Wharton School of Business and the College of Arts and Sciences. He was a member of Pi Lambda Phi Fraternity at Penn.

== Career ==
Early on in his career, Tiwary held several major label music industry positions, including launching and heading the Alternative Marketing Department at Mercury/PolyGram Records and managing Video Promotion for Mercury/PolyGram, where he worked closely with MTV and VH1.

In 2004, Tiwary was a lead producer for a Broadway revival of Lorraine Hansberry's A Raisin in the Sun.

In 2010, Tiwary was a co-producer for both the Broadway productions of Green Day's rock opera, American Idiot, and The Addams Family. In total, Tiwary's Broadway productions have garnered a total of 25 Tony Awards stemming from 44 Tony nominations.

Tiwary produced a stage musical of Jagged Little Pill, inspired by Alanis Morissette’s groundbreaking album of the same name, with a new story by Academy Award-winner Diablo Cody and directed by Tony Award-winner Diane Paulus. The musical played a record-breaking, sold-out world premiere at American Repertory Theater in Boston from May 5 to July 15, 2018. It opened on Broadway on December 5, 2019. The show ran for 171 performances, closing on December 17th, 2021, amid the COVID-19 pandemic.

On September 26, 2015, Tiwary hosted the Harvey Awards.

Tiwary is also a pioneering producer in the world of site-specific, tech-based, and immersive theatre. He consulted on the creation and development of The Walking Dead Escape and The Walking Dead Experience. He served on the Board of Directors for New York’s seminal GAle GAtes—considered to be the founders of immersive theatre. He also produced experiential shows and installations for boundary-pushing companies such as The Wooster Group, Fischerspooner, and the São Paulo Art Biennial.

Tiwary is the Co-Founder of Musicians On Call, a nonprofit organization that uses music and entertainment to complement the healing process.

=== The Fifth Beatle ===
Tiwary's graphic novel The Fifth Beatle was released in November 2013 and spent several weeks on The New York Times best-seller list, reaching #1 in its third week of release. In June 2014, The Fifth Beatle was nominated for a True Believers Comics Award for "Favorite 2013 Original Graphic Novel". The Fifth Beatle was announced as an INDIEFAB 2013 GOLD Winner for Graphic Novels & Comics. On July 25, 2014, The Fifth Beatle received the Eisner Award for Best Reality-Based Work. On September 6, 2014, at Baltimore Comic-Con, The Fifth Beatle won two Harvey Awards for "Best Graphic Album - Original" and "Best Biographical, Historical, or Journalistic Presentation". A paperback edition was released in October 2016.

Tiwary is attached to write and produce a television miniseries based on The Fifth Beatle. Sonar Entertainment has optioned the rights to The Fifth Beatle for development as a multi-part television event series. Tiwary will pen the series adaptation and serve as executive producer. The project has also acquired rights to Beatles songs from Sony.

=== TEG+ ===
On February 23, 2022, Tiwary closed an equity investment to launch TEG+, expanding on his award-winning work at Tiwary Entertainment Group. With the addition of former Netflix and Donners’ Company exec, Jack Leslie, as co-president and Head of Film + Television, TEG+ is primed to impact film and television immediately. TEG+ focuses entirely on working with high-profile original music, premier established music catalogs, A-list musicians, and composers—creating narrative entertainment for all forms of media and technology (stage, film, TV, NFTs, etc.). TEG+’s first venture into TV and film is the previously announced limited TV series The Fifth Beatle: The Brian Epstein Story. The Fifth Beatle is the only project about Brian Epstein with The Beatles music/song rights in place and is the first non-documentary bio project about the Beatles to have secured access to their music/songs. The Fifth Beatle is part of a slate of ten new projects revolving around high-profile music, the rest of which will be announced in the coming months. TEG+ named Elie Landau as Chief Operating Officer on March 11, 2022.

TEG+ announced its next project on March 11, 2022. Acquiring the stage rights to the beloved children's book Harold and the Purple Crayon by Crockett Johnson with plans to adapt it into a Broadway production, the musical will feature new and original songs composed by pop group AJR’s Jack and Ryan Met. TEG+ is still in the process of securing a book writer for the Broadway adaptation.

== Personal life ==
Tiwary lives in New York with his wife, author, researcher, professor of psychology and neuroscience, Dr. Tracy Dennis-Tiwary, and their two children, Kavi and Nandini.
