= Tundra (comic strip) =

Comic strip written and drawn by cartoonist Chad Carpenter from Wasilla, Alaska, U.S.

Tundra is a comic strip written and drawn by Wasilla, Alaska, cartoonist Chad Carpenter. The comic usually deals with wildlife, nature and outdoor life. Tundra began in December 1991 in the Anchorage Daily News and is currently self-syndicated to over 600 newspapers. The strip was named the best newspaper panel of 2007 by the National Cartoonists Society and nominated again in 2011.

Tundra is primarily drawn in two styles, single-panel gag comics using puns in combination with wildlife and the outdoors, and a three-panel strip that employs regular characters: Sherman the Squirrel, Dudley the Bear, Chad the Cartoonist, Andy Lemming, Whiff Skunk, and Hobart the Wise. These comics, usually Sunday strips, contain more written dialogue and generally more complex jokes.

== Characters ==
Characters in Tundra include:

=== Chad ===
The main character. As a classically trained cartoonist, Chad makes a living that provides him both a lack of social status and a lack of funding. Primarily, his job is to pay for everything, especially any damage that any of the animals living in his place cause; this applies almost exclusively to Sherman. He is above dumpster diving with Dudley, but only because he has already been thrown out of the dumpsters of the classier establishments.

=== Sherman ===
The main squirrel. Sherman's lot in life is to cause trouble in one form or another, either by swindling someone outright or by swindling them behind their back. He often "fixes" things that aren't broken, causing them to work in a way other than intended, usually causing Chad some sort of pain, such as "fixing" a Lava Lamp that erupts in Chad's face or fixing a vacuum cleaner that sends the gang back in time. He regularly has trouble with the law, commonly beginning with his alter ego Major Nut.

=== Dudley ===
The main bear, an overweight Brown Bear whose large size is frequently emphasized. The comic features fictional single-panel strips that are claimed to be written by Dudley labelled "Dudley's Dud's", which rely heavily on puns for humor.

=== Andy ===
The main lemming. He is the great innocent youth of Tundra. Although Andy is still drawn almost identically as he was when he first appeared in the strip, he has undergone the most dramatic personality change. Initially he was introduced as being suicidal but just couldn't go through with his natural instincts. After landing on Dudley's head in a suicide attempt, Sherman recruited him as a drummer into the newfound grunge polka band The Barking Wallspiders.

=== Whiff ===
The main skunk. Related to Sherman, Whiff began his Tundra career as manager of The Barking Wallspiders. He's known to have a problem with body odors and has made odoreaters disintegrate on contact. Whiff has his own comics, Whiff's Stinkers.

=== Hobart ===
The main Wisedude. He was found near his monastery butting heads with wild goats. Fellow monks determined that this unmonkish behavior reflected badly on them and shipped him off to his nephew Andy in Alaska. His great wise sayings provide moments of clarity otherwise unknown to Gangrene Gultch, yet still often ignored. "The butterfly is nature's most beautiful creature but cockroaches get to eat a whole lot more cool stuff." Hobart's wisdom falls on deaf ears, but perhaps that's best for all concerned.

=== Other characters ===
A few recurring characters of the strip include:

- Mr. Dale the lovable Con Artist : (In a variety of jobs; exorcist, demon, etc.)
- The Moose Nuggets : Animated moose droppings with an agenda.
- Big Bobby Darin : Long on stupidity but short on brains. Enjoys shiny objects, crayons, and taxidermy.

== Books ==
- Tundra: Fashionably Funny. 2021. Tundra & Associates.
- Tundra: All the Trimmings. 2019. Tundra & Associates.
- Tundra: 2-Ply-Strength Humor. 2018. Tundra & Associates.
- Tundra: Laugh Until it Hurts. 2017. Tundra & Associates.
- Tundra's Really Swell Sunday Comics Collection. 2015. Tundra & Associates.
- Tundra: Tooth Chattering Fun. 2014. Tundra & Associates.
- Tundra: Out On a Limb. 2012. Tundra & Associates.
- Tundra: The Next Degeneration. 2011. Tundra & Associates.
- Tundra: Nature's #1 Comic Strip. 2010. Tundra & Associates.
- Tundra: Organically Grown Humor. 2009. Tundra & Associates.
- Tundra: 100% Naturally Flavored Comics. 2007. Tundra & Associates
- Tundra: The Comic Strip Mother Nature Warned you About. 2005. Tundra & Associates.
- Tundra Comic Strip Presents: True North. 2006. Altitude Publishing.
- Tundra: "Freeze-Dried Comics". 2004. Tundra & Associates.
- Tundra: Nature's Finest Comic Strip. 2003. Tundra & Associates.
- Tundra in Full Color. 2002. Tundra & Associates.
- Chad Carpenter Presents the Really Big Tundra Treasury. 2001. Tundra & Associates.
- Tundra. 2001. Off-the-Wall.
- Tundra Presents: Humor for the Complete Idiot. 1998. Tundra & Associates.
- Tundra: the comic strip Mother Nature warned you about. 1997. Tundra & Associates.
- Tundra's Unauthorized Nursery Rhymes. 1997. Todd Publications.
- Tundra Presents: And Now a Break from Sanity. 1997. Todd Publications.
- Tundra III: Even More Cartoons of a Northerly Nature. 1997. Todd Publications.
- Tundra II: More Cartoons from the Last Frontier. 1997. Todd Publications.
- Tundra. 1997. Todd Publications.
- Tundra Alaska Coloring Book. 1996. Todd Publications.
- Tundra: 'Cartoons from the Last Frontier. 1993. Todd Publications. (ISBN 1-878100-54-8)

== Tundra board game ==
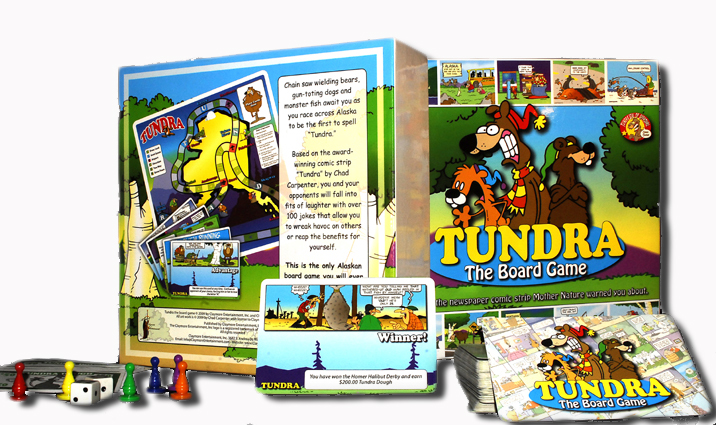
Overview of the Tundra board game

In 2009, Chad Carpenter teamed up with Claymore Entertainment, Inc., a company located in his hometown of Wasilla, to develop Tundra The Board Game. The developers describe the game as follows:

Chainsaw wielding bears, gun toting dogs and monster fish await you as you race across Alaska to be the first to spell 'Tundra'. Based on the award winning comic strip 'Tundra' by Chad Carpenter, you and your opponents will fall into fits of laughter with over 100 jokes that allow you to reek [sic] havoc on others or reap the benefits for yourself. This is the only Alaskan board game you will ever need to own!

The goal of Tundra The Board Game is to be the first player to spell the word Tundra by completing various goals while adventuring across the state of Alaska. During this process the players get to use cards which each have a comic strip depicted on them.

The game is for two to six players; larger groups have been known to form team play. It is recommended for players age 13 and up, and takes an average time of two hours to play.

== See also ==
- Moose the movie, a 2015 supernatural comedy thriller film produced by the author.
