= The Problem Solverz =

American animated television series

- Genre: Comedy; Mystery; Surreal humor
- Created by: Ben Jones
- Written by: Eric Kaplan; Michael Yank; Dave Tennant; Ryan Levin
- Directed by: Ben Jones
- Voices of: Ben Jones; Kyle Kaplan; John DiMaggio
- Narrated by: John DiMaggio
- Composers: Ben Jones; Neon Knome pilot: Rich Porter
- Country of origin: United States
- Original language: English
- No. of seasons: 2
- No. of episodes: 26

Production
- Executive producers: Ben Jones; Nick Weidenfeld; Neon Knome pilot: John Lee; Vernon Chatman; Alyson Levy; Keith Crofford; TV series: Brian A. Miller; Jennifer Pelphrey; Curtis Lelash; Rob Sorcher; Eric Kaplan
- Producers: Neon Knome pilot: Ollie Green; TV series: Nate Funaro
- Running time: 11 minutes
- Production companies: Ben Jones Studio, Inc.; Neon Knome pilot: PFFR Productions; Williams Street; TV series: Mirari Films; Cartoon Network Studios

Original release
- Network: Cartoon Network
- Release: April 4 – September 29, 2011
- Network: Netflix
- Release: March 30, 2013

The Problem Solverz is an American animated television series created by Ben Jones for Cartoon Network. It follows Alfe, Roba, and Horace; a group of detectives in their troubled town, Farboro.

The aforementioned characters were designed while Jones attended college in the 1990s; he later founded the art collective Paper Rad with Jessica and Jacob Ciocci. The characters were featured in Jones' and the collective's animations and comics before the creator pitched a pilot in 2007 to Adult Swim featuring the trio, collaborating with PFFR and Williams Street. The network's executives referred Jones to Cartoon Network, who commissioned a series featuring the same characters. The series was produced in Adobe Flash, with around fifteen animators employed at Cartoon Network Studios and the co-production of Mirari Films.

The Problem Solverz was first aired on April 4, 2011. The first season consisted of nine episodes, concluding on September 29, 2011. A second and final season was released exclusively on Netflix in 2013. The show was initially panned by both audiences and critics, and was once considered to be one of the worst animated series ever made. Criticisms were directed to its animation, characters, and art style.

== Plot ==
From left to right: Horace, Alfe, and Roba, the main characters of the series

The series follows the eponymous detectives Alfe (Ben Jones), Roba (also Jones), and Horace (Kyle Kaplan). The trio take up solving, and sometimes creating, the numerous problems that plague their town, Farboro. To their aid is Tux Dog (John DiMaggio), an extremely wealthy dog who helps the Solverz in some of their cases but is just as often the source of their problems.

Alfe (pronounced Alfé) is a large, fluffy, fur monster (even though it was suggested that he may be "half-chocolate, half-mutt" in Neon Knome or that he was a man-dog-anteater by creator and voice actor Ben Jones during the 2011 San Diego Comic Con Panel) found and raised by Horace when both were young. He loves devouring large quantities of food, especially pizza and hamburgers, and acts impulsively during missions. Roba, Horace's twin brother and cyborg, is the smartest member of the group, but he suffers from insecurity and anxiety. Horace is the calm and collected leader of the team, usually applying common sense with his detective work and caring after Alfe.

== Development ==
=== Conception ===
Growing up in Pittsburgh, creator Ben Jones had an appreciation for comics and animation. His father's Macintosh computer served as a vehicle for Jones to create art and influenced his later visual style. Jones attended the Massachusetts College of Art and Design in the mid-1990s, where he became motivated to launch a project he could adapt to different media. This impetus manifested itself in the characters Alfe, Horace, and Roba. Tux Dog, another principal character, was designed while Jones was in primary school. After his graduation, Jones formed the art collective Paper Rad with Jessica and Jacob Ciocci in 2000. The collective moved that year to Providence, Rhode Island, to participate in the Fort Thunder music venue. After the venue's closure in 2001, Jones released animations on the Web using Adobe Flash, with some featuring Alfe.

Paper Rad later produced animations with the premise of The Problem Solverz but with the three principal characters absent. The collective's 2006 direct-to-DVD release Trash Talking features a segment called "Gone Cabin Carzy" in which Alfe, Horace, and Roba appear. In tandem with these experiments, Jones worked as a television animator on Yo Gabba Gabba! and Wonder Showzen. The year of the DVD's release, Jones talked to Nick Weidenfeld, then an executive producer at Adult Swim, about an idea for a series of his own. The result was Neon Knome, a pilot produced by PFFR Productions and Williams Street in 2008, and released on Adult Swim's website two years later as part of a development contest sponsored by Burger King. Mark Marek, who was known for his work on Nickelodeon's KaBlam! was one of the artists and animators for the short. After deciding the show's aesthetics were not a good fit for Adult Swim, who claimed it looked "too mind-blowingly cute" for their channel, the network's executives later referred Jones to Cartoon Network, believing his creativity would fit better there. Jones agreed to do business with Cartoon Network on the condition that Alfe be a character on The Problem Solverz.

=== Production ===
Farboro, the setting of the series, features vibrant art.

Eric Pringle, a veteran of 2D digital animation, was employed as animation director, providing Jones with much technical assistance. Pringle's colleagues from Foster's Home for Imaginary Friends, another Cartoon Network production, comprised a team of around fifteen full-time animators at the network's studio, all working on Apple computers. Greg Miller was hired as supervising director, Martin Cendreda as technical director, and John Pham with Jon Vermilyea as character designers. Miller is the creator of Whatever Happened to... Robot Jones?, another series on the network. Vermilyea worked also as a character designer on the network's series Adventure Time, while Cendreda, Pham, and Jones all contributed to the anthology comic book Kramers Ergot. Michael Yank was employed as a writer for most episodes, with Mirari Films' CEO Eric Kaplan supervising the creation of scripts.

The series was noted for its visual style employing highly saturated colors and varying shapes. Jones was inspired by the limited-animated series Roger Ramjet and The Rocky and Bullwinkle Show, which he felt employed good character design, cohesiveness, jokes, and timing. He credited The Problem Solverz as the first seamless use of Flash for television animation, with conceptualization and the end result occurring in the same program. Writing was the longest aspect of production, taking up to several months for the crew to conceive the story and draft a script. Animation was comparatively quicker, with the team delivering work in only a few weeks given the digital approach; Jones felt that the animators could play to the strengths of the fully digital animation process.

The show's criticism led to only 26 episodes being produced. 18 of which were produced during the first season in 2011. Towards the end of 2011, eight episodes were produced for the second and final season, and was supposed to air by the end of 2011 or any time in 2012, but due to the show's low ratings, they were only released through Netflix on March 30, 2013. However, the series production ended in mid-2012.

== Voice cast ==
=== Main ===
- Ben Jones – Alfe, Roba
- Kyle Kaplan – Horace
- John DiMaggio – Tux Dog

=== Recurring ===
- Pamela Adlon – Mr. Creame, Sweetie Creame, Danny, Danny's Mom
- James Avery – Go-Seeki Ninja Master, Ninja Master's Dad Head
- Eric Bauza – Dork Face, Ale, Alfred
- Matt Berry – Drill Sergeant
- Wayne Brady – Uncle Chocofus
- Tia Carrere – Tara
- Andrew Daly – Miss May
- Grey DeLisle – Candace, Luka
- John DiMaggio – Narrator (S01 only), Teacher, The Mewmeoh, Badcat (in "Puffy Puppiez"), Jerry, Gary
- Michael Dorn – Yamir
- Rich Fulcher – Lidget
- Nika Futterman – Stratch
- Mark Hamill – Buddy Huxton, Badcat (in "Badcat")
- Amy Hill – Mrs. Konishi
- Ben Jones – Balloon Professor, Professor Sugarfish, Rusty Pedals
- Tom Kenny – Bionic Zombies, The Android-geist
- Liz Lee – Additionals (S02E27 only)
- Vanessa Marshall – Emily, Yogi, Trudy H.
- Daran Norris – J.B. McTooth
- Chris Parnell – The Mayor, Eternitron
- Bronson Pinchot – AI (Master Artificial Intelligence)
- Kevin Michael Richardson – Wendigo
- Horatio Sanz – Ralphe
- Paul Scheer – Tony Marv, Fungsten
- Alia Shawkat – Laura
- Kath Soucie – Spiralina
- George Takei – Howard Konishi
- Jill Talley – Nina, Alpha Alien, Dolls' Kid Owner
- Brian Tee – Captain, Granite, Mini Master
- Kari Wahlgren – Katrina Rad
- Jason Walden – Tommy, JZ, Glam Metal Vampirez
- Jaleel White – K-999
- David Lander – Glam Vampire Member

== Episodes ==
=== Series overview ===
Season	Episodes	Originally released		
Season	Episodes	First released	Last released	Network
Shorts	2	2006	2007	Direct-to-video
Pilot		2008		Adult Swim
1	18	April 4, 2011	September 29, 2011	Cartoon Network
2	8	March 30, 2013		Netflix

=== Shorts (2006–07) ===
The main Problem Solverz characters first appeared in an animated short entitled, "Alfe: Gone Cabin Carzy" [sic]. The short was created and produced by the art collective Paper Rad, and was written by Ben Jones. This short was included on their DVD Trash Talking, published by Load Records in 2006.

The second Paper Rad animated short, "Problem Solvers", was released on a stand-alone DVD in 2008 as a bonus for the seventh volume of The Ganzfeld, a periodical book series written by Dan Nadel. Although it does not include the main Problem Solverz characters, it introduces the problem solving concept which Jones would use as the basis of his homonymous Cartoon Network series.

Title	Written and storyboarded by	Original release date
"Alfe: Gone Cabin Carzy"	Ben Jones (as Paper Rad)	2006
Horace is convinced that there is radiation outside since they have not gone out for 5 days. Note: A prototype of Alfe's cousin Ralphe appears in this short. He also appears in two The Problem Solverz episodes, "Glam-Vampire Hunterz" and "Zazz Boyz Are Zazzing It Up".
"Problem Solvers"	Ben Jones (as Paper Rad)	2007
The short describes the adventures of six original characters: Dewey, T Bubbles, Pandemonia, Riviera, Buck, and D-O-G. It's composed of three segments ("Intro", "Dewey's Bike Ride", and "D-O-G's Song"), and from only two episodes: Case #1220: "My Script"; Case #1211: "Give Pizza a Chance"; Note: D-O-G, Dewey, and Buck are the only characters of the short that made cameo appearances in The Problem Solverz.

=== Pilot (2008) ===
The pilot episode "Neon Knome" was produced in 2008 by PFFR and Williams Street for Adult Swim, and then released in 2010 on their official website as part of the "Big, Über, Network, Sampling" programming block.

Title	Written and directed by	Original release date
"Neon Knome"	Ben Jones	June 13, 2008
Horace, Alfe and Roba try to destroy a giant rollerblade appeared on their yard, but eventually end up getting lost in the forest.

=== Season 1 (2011) ===
No. overall	No. in season	Title	Written by	Storyboarded by	Original release date	Prod. code	US viewers (millions)
1	1	"Time Twister"	Eric Kaplan	Ben Jones	April 4, 2011	102	1.138
The Problem Solverz encounter on the city's amusement park "Time Twister", a time-travelling rollercoaster that ages people. They solve the problem of people and seal the rollercoaster, but Alfe later uses it to satisfy his pizza cravings by traveling back in time and getting a slice of pizza, and ends up causing the appearance prehistoric animals to cause chaos in the city plus he turns into a baby. To put an end to this mess, the Solverz on the advice of Tux Dog must reverse the process destroying Time Twister through its core of Eternitron, a giant clock time monster. The trio achieves this through the many Alfe's clones collected by the same rollercoaster. Note: One of the scenes in which Alfe captures his clone is taken from the segment "D-O-G's Song" of the Paper Rad's 2008 short Problem Solvers. Ask Alfe: Ask Alfe Instruction.
2	2	"Videogamez"	Michael Yank	Nick Bertonazzi	April 11, 2011	103	1.262
Horace hinders a mission by being addicted to a video game, "Tomb of Nefertiti", given to him by Famitaro's owner Mr. Konishi, to kill its rogue AI. Horace himself continuing to play for 8 days, becoming hypnotized in the process until after the universe is threatened by the same video game enemies. To stop the invasion Alfe and Roba, with the help of a special cable given to them by Tux Dog, enter the game but must return before Horace completely turns into a virtual human block. Once finding him immediately the trio must pass the last three levels and then defeat the AI at the final level. Note: Tomb of Nefertiti is the only The Problem Solverz game on the official Cartoon Network website. www.cartoonnetwork.com/games/theproblemsolverz/tombofnefertiti/index.html (Includes Badges) Ask Alfe: What should I do if I have trouble falling asleep?
3	3	"K-999 and Da Little Explorerz"	Michael Yank	Nick Bertonazzi	April 18, 2011	104	1.152
The Problem Solverz team up with K-999, a robot dog to stop a Girl Scout-aided alien invasion. Ask Alfe: My hair gets so tangled up!
4	4	"Awesome Banditz"	Michael Yank	Nick Bertonazzi	April 25, 2011	105	1.148
The Problem Solverz are involved, thanks to the Police Captain of the city's huge mall, in an underground elevator racing, world from which they capture a group of thieves place experts in this race, called the "Elevator Banditz". To capture Alfe and Roba go undercover, and to do dress up and look like them. Ask Alfe: I'm not sneaky enough.
5	5	"Funny Facez"	Michael Yank	Leo Riley	May 2, 2011	106	1.277
The work of a funny-face artists named Tony Marv, which Roba is a biggest fan, is stolen due to someone who leaked the photos of him in his program for the next show. His assistant Buddy Huxton presents the Problem Solverz, who asked them to solve this problem, finding the culprit. At the beginning Roba and Horace are still in doubt to solve it due to Alfe, that under the effect of "Taco crazy" think they know you already know everything with a rangefinder taco, and doing even suspect that a loser funny-faces artist named Fungsten has not leaked the photos. But then discover that real culprit is still at large when the taco truck sign blocking the view. At the end the trio back to Buddy Huxton which, however, admits: he leaked that photos to postpone tonight's show of Tony, and in order to avenge him for his trauma as a child. Ask Alfe: What can I do at the beach?
6	6	"Hide and Seek Ninjaz"	Michael Yank	Nick Bertonazzi	May 9, 2011	107	1.424
Alfe, Roba and Horace find some Go-Seeki Hide and Seek Ninjaz, whom kidnap a little girl of the Hido Clan's mom. Ask Alfe: I'm totally stumped!
7	7	"The Mayan Ice Cream Caper"	Eric Kaplan	Ben Jones	May 16, 2011	101	1.647
The Problem Solverz are called upon to stop an ice-cream factory from being destroyed by its owner. Note 1: Before of the official debut of The Problem Solverz on Cartoon Network, a preview of this episode was shown on the official Paper Rad YouTube channel. Note 2: The opening theme in this episode is to Neon Knome, the Adult Swim's pilot. Ask Alfe: From this episode onward, no Ask Alfe segments appear.
8	8	"Badcat"	Michael Yank	Casey Leonard	May 23, 2011	108	1.274
Tux Dog gets over his head and tried to stop Badcat himself. The Problem Solverz promise the mayor to solve this problem. They enter Badcat's hideout, but Alfe and Roba refused because of their disguise. Horace insults the senses into them.
9	9	"Fauxboro"	Michael Yank	Casey Leonard	May 30, 2011	109	1.508
The town of Farboro is getting a little stranger every minute; Alfe's drums sound weird, the root beer tastes bad, and the people of Farboro declare no more problems. Worse, they have been replaced by Bionic Zombies! If the gang doesn't stop them, they're toast!
10	10	"Magic Clock"	Michael Yank	Casey Leonard	June 6, 2011	110	1.498
Alfe, Roba and Horace try to get back a stolen clock, followed by hardcore fan Katrina Rad turns on them, because she wants to use the clock to date Roba.
11	11	"Breakfast Wars"	Michael Yank	Casey Leonard	June 13, 2011	112	1.588
Alfe, Roba and Horace try to find more cereal for a sugar-crazed kid.
12	12	"Zoo Cops"	Michael Yank	Casey Leonard	June 20, 2011	111	1.290
The Problem Solverz try to help the zoo to capture Dork Face. But things goes bad when agent Lidget betrays the Problem Solverz, Dork Face sends them into a different world. Now Horace, Alfe and Roba have to get out in Flatland in time.
13	13	"Hamburger Cavez"	Michael Yank	Casey Leonard	August 25, 2011	114	1.125
Horace and Roba force Alfe to go on a camping trip. Alfe, in a "mad-for-hamburgers" phase, wanders off looking for some, and stumbles upon an old cave and accidentally releases and gets possessed by a man eating spirit named Wendigo. Note: Stylized versions of Mordecai and Rigby are briefly shown.
14	14	"Puffy Puppiez"	Dave Tennant	Casey Leonard	September 1, 2011	115	1.055
When Roba vows to take care of Miss May's puppies (much to the dismay of Alfe and Horace), things get complicated as the puppies destroy the trio's furniture and sends Roba spiraling into a craze. Meanwhile, Badcat (voiced in this episode by John DiMaggio) returns to exterminate and put all dogs in a "dog superjail" (a dog themed reference to Superjail!). Later, Alfe enters a bike contest to save the dogs from Badcat's evil minions.
15	15	"Glam-Vampire Hunterz"	Dave Tennant	Casey Leonard	September 8, 2011	116	1.191
Alfe, Roba & Horace try to stop a group of metal rock vampires from taking over Farboro. Later, Ralphe (Alfe's cousin and mentor) stops by for a visit and claims to know the secret method of destroying the Glam Metal Vampirez. In the end they find that Ralphe might not be all that he had claimed to be.
16	16	"Problem Solverz Academy"	Ryan Levin	Casey Leonard	September 15, 2011	117	1.280
Tux Dog sends the trio back to school to get better at solving problems. Roba becomes the "cool guy" and Horace finds out how tough it is to be the super dork. Later, Tux Dog sends K-999 too for training in the Problem Solverz Academy.
17	17	"Mermaid Raid"	Ryan Levin	Casey Leonard	September 22, 2011	118	1.184
Alfe pretends to be afraid of water, which prevents the Problem Solverz from answering a mermaid's distress call.
18	18	"Tux Dog's Island"	Michael Yank	Leo Riley	September 29, 2011	113	1.072
The trio goes on a vacation to an island resort sent by Tux Dog. But Horace thinks the island is too perfect, and tries to find a problem to solve.

=== Season 2 (2013) ===
Eight episodes were produced for Season 2 and were originally supposed to air in 2012, but were released through Netflix on March 30, 2013 due to the show's negative critical reception. However, all the episodes in Netflix were removed permanently 2 years later. It never aired on television.

No. overall	No. in season	Title	Written by	Storyboarded by	Original release date
19	1	"Making of The Problem Solverz Video Game"	Ryan Levin	Casey Leonard	March 30, 2013
When Mr. Konishi (from "Videogamez") is kicked out by his wife, the Solverz decide to take him in. He then agrees to develop a video game for the trio as payment.
20	2	"Alfe is Da Boss"	Ryan Levin	Casey Leonard	March 30, 2013
Alfe gains authority over the house and becomes corrupt beyond repair shortly after.
21	3	"Roba Has Dreadlocks"	Ryan Levin	Casey Leonard	March 30, 2013
Roba becomes a hippie after Alfe eats the water bill.
22	4	"Alfe Has a Baby"	Ryan Levin	Casey Leonard	March 30, 2013
The Problem Solverz must care after the daughter of Alfe's Uncle Chocofus.
23	5	"Zazz Boyz Are Zazzing it Up"	Ryan Levin	Casey Leonard	March 30, 2013
Alfe and Roba form their own band, much to the chagrin of Horace when he is thrown out of the band due to his terrible vocal skills.
24	6	"Yogurt Nights"	Ryan Levin	Casey Leonard	March 30, 2013
Alfe discovers that Roba and Horace attend a support group for people that live with fur monsters. NOTE: This episode reveals Alfe's species as a fur monster.
25	7	"Super Close TV Watching"	Ryan Levin	Casey Leonard	March 30, 2013
The trio decide to join a league when Horace demonstrates his professional soccer skills.
26	8	"Alfe's Gonna Run Away"	Ryan Levin	Casey Leonard	March 30, 2013
After being disciplined by Roba and Horace too many times, Alfe decides to leave the gang in search of more 'awesome' places.

== Release ==
The Problem Solverz was first aired on April 4, 2011, on Cartoon Network. The premiere was seen by 1.1 million viewers, receiving a Nielsen rating of 0.8, in that 0.8 percent of families with a television set viewed the episode on that date. The most-watched episode of the series ("The Mayan Ice Cream Caper") was seen by 1.6 million viewers. Viewership fell with the first episode to have been aired on a Thursday ("Hamburger Cavez"), which was watched by 1.1 million viewers. The first season concluded on September 29, 2011, after eighteen episodes. A second season consisting of eight episodes was released exclusively on Netflix on March 30, 2013.

== Reception ==
The series received mostly negative reviews from critics, who viewed the series as "dull, boring, and uninteresting"; but worse reviews from audiences and online viewers. Criticism of The Problem Solverz was directed at the visual style and writing. Rob Owen writing for the Pittsburgh Post-Gazette called the style reminiscent of Atari 5200 video games and wrote that viewers could "thank" or "blame" Jones for his creation. For the magazine Variety, Brian Lowry disregarded the series as uninteresting and challenging to watch, the visuals and sounds weird for weirdness' sake. Emily Ashby of Common Sense Media defined the series as misguided, its stories as undeveloped, and its visual style as unappealing. The Weekly Alibi's Devin D. O'Leary acknowledged the style as Paper Rad's own and found the writing more solid than that of Adult Swim's programming for which it could be mistaken. The jokes were not instantly funny according to O'Leary, but the visual style combined with the writing would provide amusement for Paper Rad's existing fans. Critics felt that the series would've worked better had it been on Adult Swim instead of Cartoon Network.

Art-related publications, on the other hand, gave praise to Jones' creativity. Dan Nadel, a former publisher of Jones, lauded the series in The Comics Journal for the imagination displayed, "funny and humane and invaluable" at the same time. Paper writer Sammy Harkham called The Problem Solverz "radical" and unlike any other series on television. Geek Exchange writer Liz Ohanesian called the second season more "subdued" than the first, allowing viewers to concentrate on the principal character's relationships. She compared the series to the band Anamanaguchi, in that its unique and polarizing style makes fans of the series hard to find.

== See also ==
- Stone Quackers – Animated series created by Jones following his work on The Problem Solverz
- Saturday Morning All Star Hits! – Animated series created by Jones following his work on the Problem Solverz and Stone Quackers.
