= Eric Kaplan =

American television writer

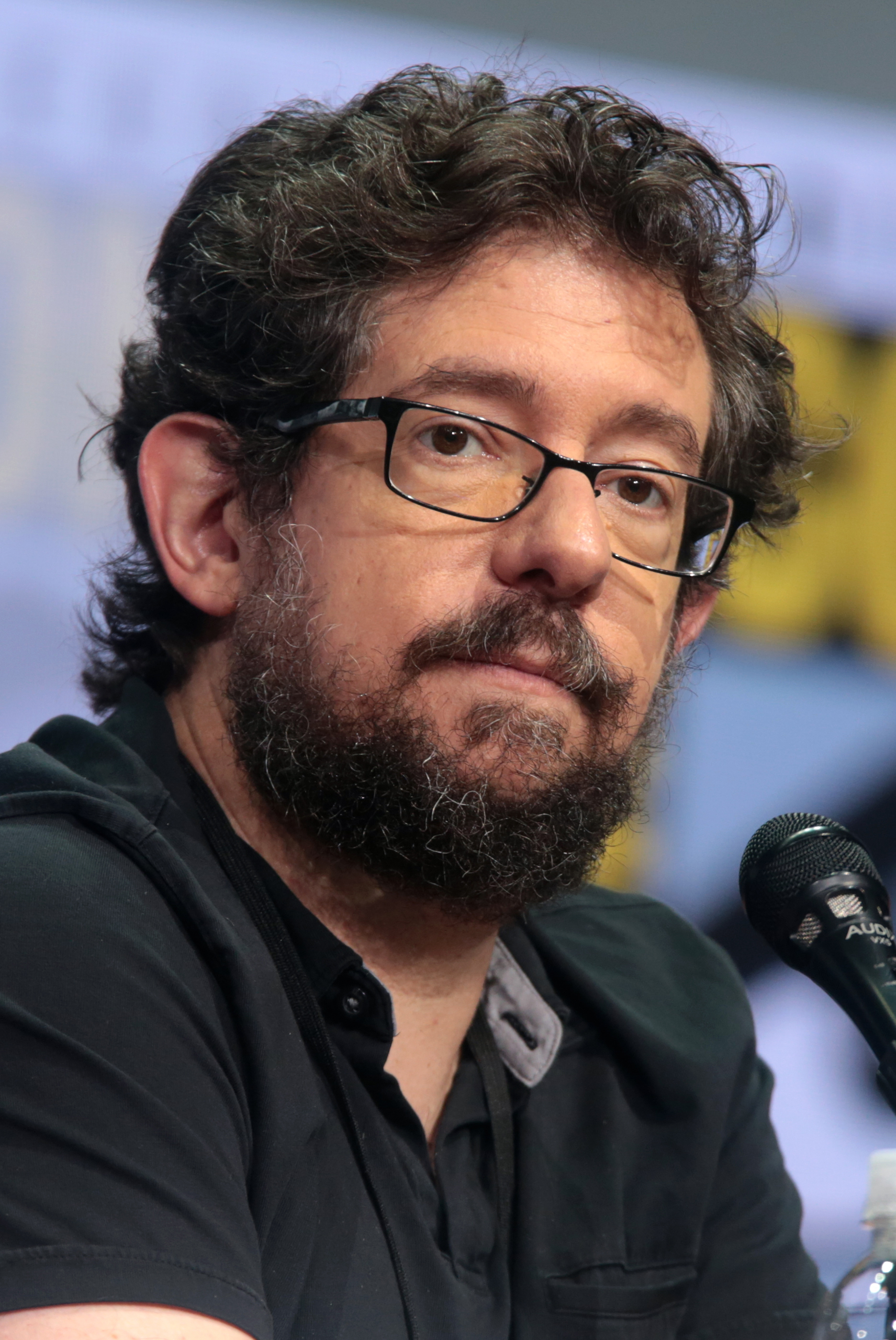
- Kaplan at the 2017 San Diego Comic-Con
- Born: September 10, 1971 (age 54); Brooklyn, New York, U.S.
- Education: Harvard University (AB); Columbia University (MA); University of California, Berkeley (PhD)
- Occupations: Television writer, producer, story editor

Eric Kaplan is an American television writer and producer. His work has included shows such as Late Show with David Letterman, Andy Richter Controls the Universe, Malcolm in the Middle, Futurama and The Simpsons. He also worked on The Big Bang Theory throughout its run.

== Early life ==
Kaplan was raised in a Jewish family in Flatbush, Brooklyn where his father was a "storefront lawyer" and his mother taught high school biology at Erasmus Hall. Kaplan graduated from Hunter College High School and Harvard College (where he wrote for the Harvard Lampoon) in 1989. Prior to committing to a career in professional writing, Kaplan taught English in Thailand. After that he took five years of philosophy graduate school at Columbia and UC Berkeley. At Berkeley, Kaplan studied philosophy of artificial intelligence under his advisor, Hubert Dreyfus, who was a leading voice on the philosophical implications of artificial intelligence.

Starting in 1986, Kaplan interned for Spy magazine, where his duties included mopping the floors and writing blurb-length film reviews.

== Career in television ==
Eric Kaplan's first television writing job was with Late Show with David Letterman where he worked for a year and a half before moving to Hollywood to look for a job in "half-hour" work. It was at this time that Kaplan learned of Matt Groening doing a show set in the year 3000. This show would turn out to be Futurama. After applying for work on the show using some writing samples, Eric would have to, as he says, "sweat it out", for over a month before getting the job. Upon Futurama's cancellation, Kaplan went to work for the short-lived comedy series Andy Richter Controls the Universe, writing just one episode. After Fox dropped Andy Richter, Eric Kaplan then began work on the hit show Malcolm in the Middle, Eric also wrote the "Girlfriends" episode of the popular HBO series, Flight of the Conchords.

=== Futurama ===
In his first year with Futurama, which was also the show's first season, Kaplan served as story editor on every episode. Though having an input on many aspects of the entire first season, Kaplan would not get a writing credit until 9 episodes in. After this premiere season, he would be promoted to producer status. This was a role that he would keep through the show's end. He returned to those roles in the Futurama DVD movies.

Futurama episode writing credits:

- "Hell Is Other Robots"
- "Why Must I Be a Crustacean in Love?"
- "A Bicyclops Built for Two"
- "Parasites Lost"
- "I Dated a Robot"
- "Jurassic Bark"
- "Three Hundred Big Boys"

Futurama DVD movies writing credits:

- Futurama: The Beast with a Billion Backs – winner of the Annie Award for Best Animated DVD Feature
- Futurama: Bender's Game

=== The Simpsons ===
He wrote the season 24 episode "The Saga of Carl".

=== Malcolm in the Middle ===
In his two years as a writer on Malcolm in the Middle, Kaplan wrote seven episodes while serving as supervising producer in the first half of the 5th season and co-executive producer throughout the rest of the series' run.

Malcolm in the Middle episode writing credits:

- "Dirty Magazine"
- "Victor's Other Family"
- "Dewey's Opera"
- "Ida's Dance"
- "Blackout"
- "Hal Grieves"

=== Zombie College ===
Zombie College was an internet web series Kaplan created that revolved around a student at a college full of zombies.

Kaplan described the premise of Zombie College as

the idea of the human ability to get used to practically anything. That there's nothing so horrible that we can't get used to it and accept it as part of life (...) Zombie College is an environment where there are undead monsters running around and trying to eat your brain but everybody is o.k. with it and they're more interested in getting good grades.

=== The Drinky Crow Show ===
Kaplan co-created The Drinky Crow Show, based on the Maakies comics by Tony Millionaire, for Adult Swim. The pilot aired on May 17, 2007, and the series premiered in November 2008.

=== Flight of the Conchords ===
Kaplan wrote the episode "Girlfriends".

=== The Big Bang Theory ===
Kaplan is a writer and Executive Producer on The Big Bang Theory.

=== Mirari Films ===
Kaplan was the founder of Mirari Films, an animation studio and VFX house. In addition to The Drinky Crow Show, Mirari Films has produced The Adventures of Baxter and McGuire, The Problem Solverz, King Star King and Mongo Wrestling Alliance. The Romanian studio later shut down in 2022.

=== Guys Next Door ===
Kaplan created Guys Next Door, an animated comedy series on YouTube about 3 ordinary people that team up with 3 government assassins.

=== Work in philosophy ===
Kaplan's Does Santa Exist?: A Philosophical Investigation was published by Dutton Books in 2015. It is a serious and humorous work of philosophy. He has also contributed to "The Stone", The New York Times philosophy blog. Kaplan has a PhD. in philosophy from UC Berkeley. His doctoral thesis discusses the humour in Søren Kierkegaard. He does the podcast "Terrifying Questions and How Not to Be Terrified by Them" with Barnard philosophy professor and famous Heidegger scholar Taylor Carman.

Kaplan was interviewed in 2020 by lifelong friend Roger Kimmel Smith (whose father, Robert Kimmel Smith, wrote the book The War with Grandpa, which in 2020 was adapted into a motion picture starring Robert De Niro). Their conversation about humor and philosophy was released over the YouTube channel When Humanists Attack.
