= Captain's daughter =

Captain's daughter may refer to:

- A character from the comic Maakies
- A character from the short lived series The Drinky Crow Show
