= Eisner Award for Best Writer/Artist—Humor =

Comic book award

- Awarded for: Best Best Writer/Artist—Humor
- Country: United States
- First award: 1996
- Most recent winner: Eric Powell (2008)
- Website: www.comic-con.org/awards/eisner-awards/

The Eisner Award for Best Writer/Artist—Humor was an award for "creative achievement" in American comic books. It was given out every year between 1996 and 2008.

== History and name change ==
From the creation of the Eisner Awards in 1988 to 1992, an award titled "Best Writer/Artist (Team or Individual)" was presented. In 1993, this was split into "Best Writer/Artist" (which continues to present) and "Best Writer-Artist Team" (which was only awarded once). In 1996, the award was renamed to "Best Writer/Artist Drama" and a separate award for "Best Writer/Artist—Humor" was created. In 2009, the judges made the decision to combine the Writer/Artist and Writer/Artist—Humor categories.

=== Winners and nominees ===
Year	Nominee	Titles	Ref.
1990s
1996	Sergio Aragonés	Groo (Image Comics)	
1996	Dan Clowes	Eightball (Fantagraphics)	
1996	Kim Deitch	"The Strange Secret of Molly O'Dare" in Zero Zero (Fantagraphics)	
1996	Evan Dorkin	"Instant Piano" stories (Dark Horse Comics), Milk and Cheese #666 (Slave Labor Graphics), Dork #3 (Slave Labor Graphics)	
1996	Chris Ware	Acme Novelty Library (Fantagraphics)	
1996	Jim Woodring	Jim, Jim Special: Frank's Real Pal (Fantagraphics)	
1997	Don Rosa	Walt Disney's Comics and Stories (Gladstone Publishing), Uncle Scrooge (Gladstone Publishing)	
1997	Mark Crilley	Akiko (Sirius Entertainment)	
1997	Marc Hempel	Tug & Buster (Art & Soul)	
1997	Batton Lash	Wolff & Byrd, Counselors of the Macabre (Exhibit A Press)	
1997	Carol Lay	Joy Ride and Other Stories (Kitchen Sink Press)	
1997	Masashi Tanaka	Gon (Paradox Press)	
1998	Jeff Smith	Bone (Cartoon Books)	
1998	R. Crumb	Self-Loathing (Fantagraphics), Mystic Funnies (Alex Wood)	
1998	Bill Morrison	Roswell, Little Green Man (Bongo Comics)	
1998	Masashi Tanaka	Gon (Paradox Press)	
1998	Chris Ware	Acme Novelty Library (Fantagraphics)	
1999	Kyle Baker	You Are Here (DC Comics/Vertigo Comics)	
1999	Roman Dirge	Lenore, the Cute Little Dead Girl (Slave Labor Graphics)	
1999	Evan Dorkin	Dork (Slave Labor Graphics)	
1999	Rich Koslowski	The 3 Geeks (3 Finger Press)	
1999	Batton Lash	Wolff & Byrd, Counselors of the Macabre (Exhibit A Press), Mavis (Exhibit A Press)	
2000s
2000	Kyle Baker	I Die at Midnight (DC Comics/Vertigo Comics), "Letitia Lerner, Superman's Babysitter" in Elseworlds 80-Page Giant (DC Comics)	
2000	Sergio Aragonés	"Xt'Tapalatakettle's Day" in Bart Simpson's Treehouse of Horror (Bongo Comics), Sergio Aragones' Groo & Rufferto (Dark Horse Comics/Maverick), Marginals in Mad (DC Comics)	
2000	Mark Crilley	Akiko (Sirius Entertainment)	
2000	Jay Hosler	Clan Apis (Active Synapse)	
2000	Lewis Trondheim	The Nimrod (Fantagraphics), "The Beach" in Measles #3 (Fantagraphics)	
2001	Tony Millionaire	Maakies (Fantagraphics), Sock Monkey (Dark Horse Comics/Maverick)	
2001	Alison Bechdel	Post-Dykes to Watch Out For (Firebrand Books)	
2001	Ben Katchor	Julius Knipl: The Beauty Supply District (Pantheon Books)	
2001	Michael Kupperman	Snake 'n' Bacon Cartoon Cabaret (HarperCollins)	
2001	Pete Sickman-Garner	Hey, Mister (Top Shelf Productions)	
2001	Judd Winick	The Adventures of Barry Ween, Boy Genius 2.0 (Oni Press)	
2002	Evan Dorkin	Dork (Slave Labor Graphics)	
2002	Tom Beland	True Story, Swear to God (Clib's Boy Comics)	
2002	Chynna Clugston-Major	Blue Monday: Absolute Beginners (Oni Press)	
2002	Makoto Kobayashi	"What's Michael?" in Super Manga Blast! (Dark Horse Comics)	
2002	Chris Ware	Acme Novelty Library (Fantagraphics)	
2002	Judd Winick	The Adventures of Barry Ween, Boy Genius (Oni Press)	
2003	Tony Millionaire	House at Maakies Corner (Fantagraphics)	
2003	Kim Deitch	Stuff of Dreams (Fantagraphics)	
2003	Derf (John Beckderf)	Trashed: True Tales from the Back of a Garbage Truck (SLG)	
2003	Roger Langridge	Fred the Clown (Hotel Fred Press)	
2004	Kyle Baker	Plastic Man (DC Comics), The New Baker (Kyle Baker Publishing)	
2004	Tony Millionaire	Sock Monkey (Dark Horse Comics)	
2004	Eric Powell	The Goon (Dark Horse Comics)	
2004	Joann Sfar	Little Vampire Does Kung Fu! (Simon & Schuster), Little Vampire Goes to School (Simon & Schuster)	
2004	Jeff Smith	Bone (Cartoon Books)	
2005	Kyle Baker	Plastic Man (DC Comics), Kyle Baker, Cartoonist (Kyle Baker Publishing)	
2005	Phil Foglio	Girl Genius (Airship Entertainment)	
2005	Scott Kurtz	PvP (Image Comics)	
2005	Eric Powell	The Goon (Dark Horse Comics)	
2005	Johnny Ryan	Angry Youth Comix (Fantagraphics)	
2006	Kyle Baker	Plastic Man (DC Comics), The Bakers (Kyle Baker Publishing)	
2006	Paige Braddock	Jane's World (Girl Twirl)	
2006	Bryan Lee O'Malley	Scott Pilgrim vs. the World (Oni Press)	
2006	Eric Powell	The Goon (Dark Horse Comics)	
2006	Seth	Wimbledon Green (Drawn & Quarterly)	
2007	Tony Millionaire	Billy Hazelnuts (Fantagraphics), Sock Monkey: The Inches Incident (Dark Horse Comics)	
2007	Ivan Brunetti	Schizo (Fantagraphics)	
2007	Lilli Carré	Tales of Woodsman Pete (Top Shelf Productions)	
2007	Michael Kupperman	Tales Designed to Thrizzle (Fantagraphics)	
2007	Lewis Trondheim	A.L.I.E.E.E.N. (First Second Books), Mr. I (NBM Publishing)	
2008	Eric Powell	The Goon (Dark Horse Comics)	
2008	Kyle Baker	The Bakers: Babies and Kittens (Image Comics)	
2008	Fred Chao	Johnny Hiro (AdHouse Books)	
2008	Brandon Graham	King City (Tokyopop), Multiple Warheads (Oni Press)	
2008	James Stokoe	Wonton Soup (Oni Press)	
