= Sock monkey =

Stuffed toy

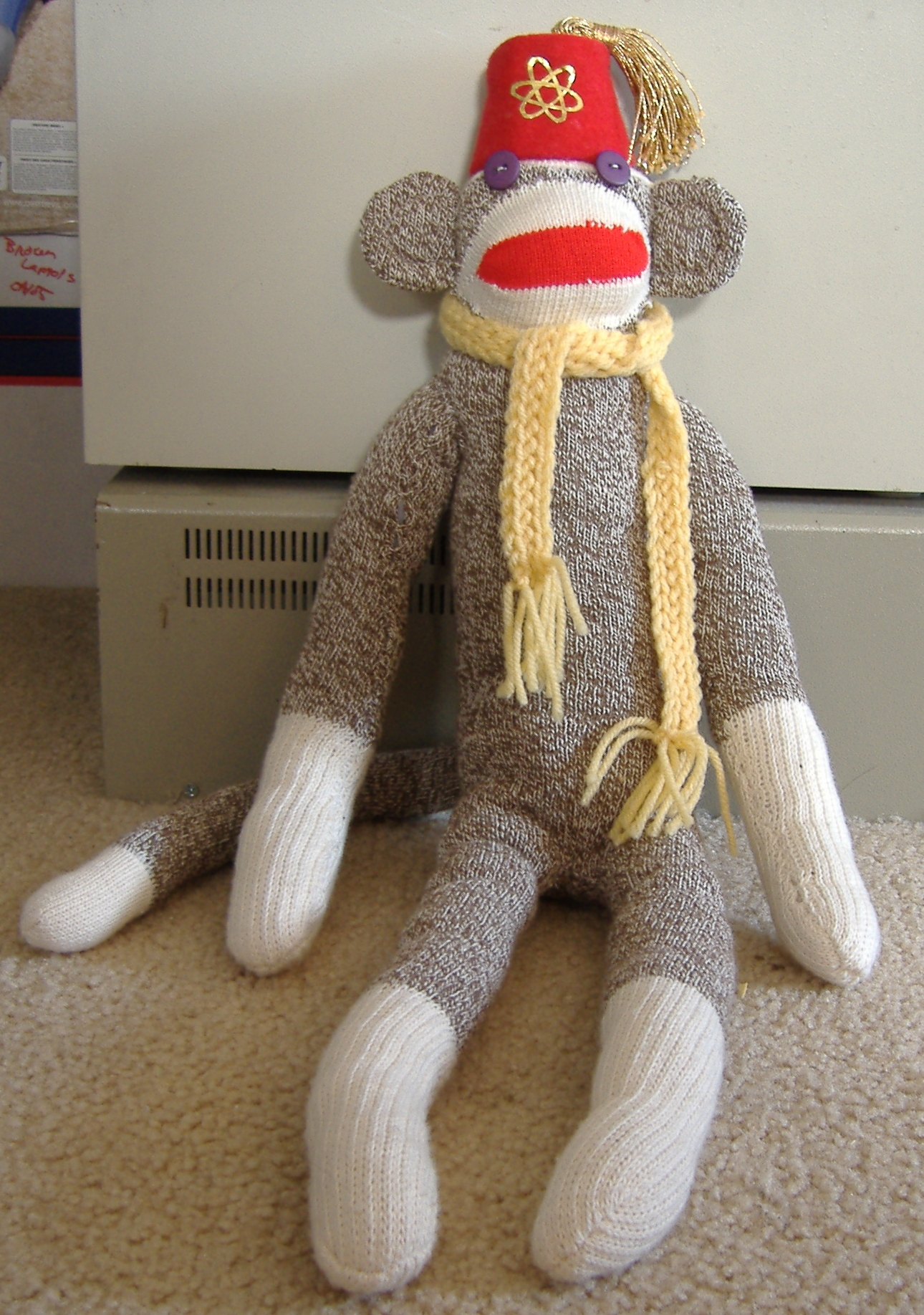
A homemade sock monkey wearing a fez and scarf

A sock monkey is a stuffed toy made from socks fashioned in the likeness of a monkey. These stuffed animals are a mixture of folk art and kitsch in the cultures of the United States and Canada. The typical sock monkey is brown and white with extra long limbs, a long tail and bright red lips. The animal may be adorned with additional ornamentation on its head or around its neck. The character has become part of popular culture and can be found in comic books and art.

== Origin ==
The sock monkey's most direct predecessors originated in the Victorian era, when the craze for imitation stuffed animals swept from Europe into North America and met the burgeoning Arts and Crafts movement. Craft makers began sewing stuffed animals as toys to comfort children, and, as tales of the Scramble for Africa increased the public's familiarity with exotic species, monkey toys soon became a fixture of American nurseries. Tales like Rudyard Kipling's The Jungle Book and Just So Stories inspired crafters to create toys that depicted exotic animals, however these early stuffed monkeys were not necessarily made from socks, and also lacked the characteristic red lips of the sock monkeys popular today.

John Nelson, a Swedish immigrant to the United States, patented the sock-knitting machine in 1868, and began knitting socks on an automatic machine in Rockford, Illinois, as early as 1870. On September 15, 1880, the Nelson Knitting Company formed, producing "Celebrated Rockford Seamless Hosiery", and selling them under the name of the "Nelson Sock".

John Nelson's son Franklin created a machine that knitted a sock without seams in the heel. The original machine required workers to sew every seam at the heel. The seamless sock saved time and labor costs and it became so popular, companies began to imitate his idea. These seamless work socks were so popular that the market was soon flooded with imitators, and socks of this type were known under the generic term "Rockfords".

The iconic sock monkeys made from red-heeled socks, known today as the "Rockford Red Heel", emerged at the earliest in 1932, the year the Nelson Knitting Company added the trademark red heel to its product. In 1932, advertising executive Howard Monk came up with an idea to change the heel of the brown sock from white to red. The red heeled sock was marketed as "de-tec-tip". Nelson Knitting added the red heel "De-Tec-Tip" to assure its customers that they were buying "original Rockfords" as opposed to the generic "Rockfords". This red heel gave the monkeys their distinctive mouth and during the Great Depression, American crafters first made sock monkeys out of worn-out Rockford Red Heel Socks.

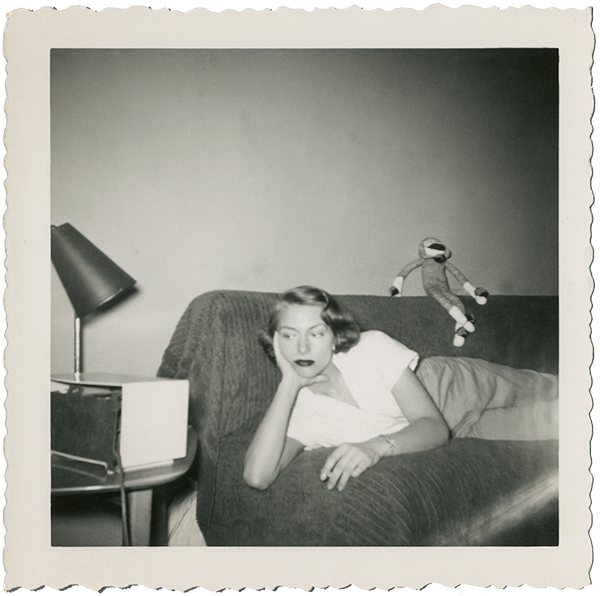
Joyce Ingling with her sock monkey c. 1956

In 1953, a woman named Helen Cooke received the patent for sock monkeys. She sued a man named Stanley Levy because he sold sock monkeys but they were not the same design as hers. Levy contacted the Nelson Knitting Company hoping that they would declare the patent invalid. The company knew that people had been making dolls for the last two years, so they gathered up all the dolls that had been made the past two years so that they could have evidence proving that Helen Cooke should not have the patent. One of the most important pieces of evidence was a testimony and a doll made in February 1951 by a lady named Grace Wingent. She was a resident of Rockford and she had made a doll for her grandson. Helen Cooke settled the case against Stanley Levy when she was shown all the evidence that had been collected against her. She decided to sell the patent to the Nelson Knitting Company for $750. The company also paid other women for the rights to the doll including a woman in Tennessee who was paid $1000. Rockford, Illinois, became the "home of the sock monkey."

== Today ==
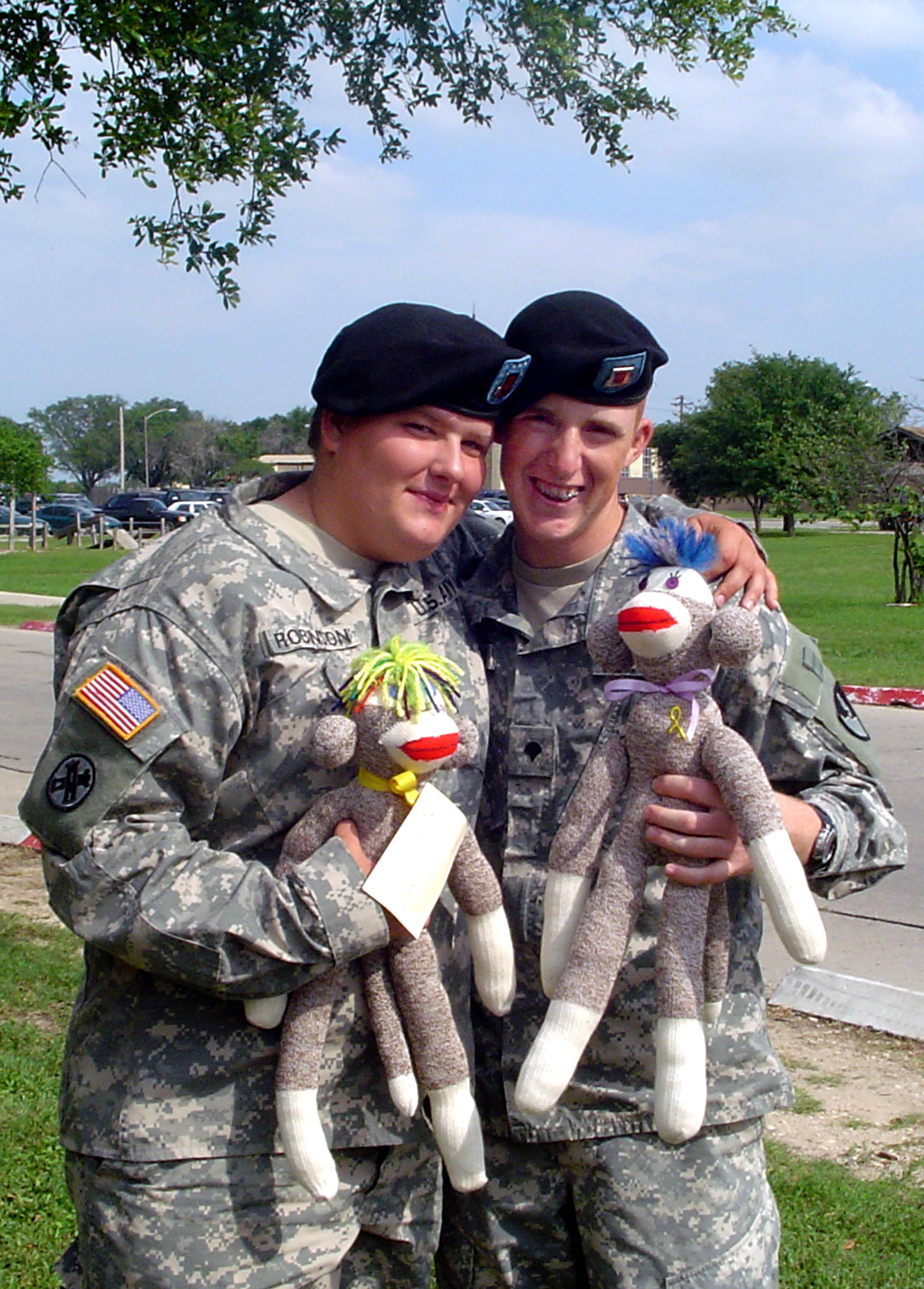
Servicemembers with sock monkeys made in Chelsea, Alabama.

Sock monkeys remain a popular icon and are popular with all ages. They now come in different styles, such as "birthday-themed", different colors, and even electronic ones that sing pop songs. Most vintage red-heel sock monkeys found today are no older than the late 1950s, and many date from the 1970s.

A number of methods exist for dating red-heel sock monkeys, including the colors, shape of the red heel (elongated oval or swing), the amount of cream color in the red-heel and toe areas, sock seams, and interior sock content.

The term "vintage" red-heel sock monkeys is typically relegated to sock monkeys made from red-heel socks knitted by the Nelson Knitting Company and from similar socks knitted with red-heels by other companies in the same time period. The term "modern" red-heel sock monkeys is normally relegated to sock monkey dolls created after Fox River Mills, Inc. acquired the Nelson Knitting Company in 1992.

Homemade red-heel sock monkey dolls usually have unique faces and body characteristics and are considered one-of-a-kind. Sock monkey dolls can also be mass-manufactured.

Not all sock monkey dolls are created from red-heel socks. A 2015 book shows that more colorful sock monkeys have become a trend, such as monkeys made from socks with multicolored striped or polka dot patterns, and monkeys made from mismatched socks.

Sock monkeys can become the center of special occasions such as trips, birthdays, anniversaries, weddings, and graduations, with their images being used in photography, books, bookmarks, journals, greeting cards, jewelry, quilting, baking, sewing, commercials and movies.

Sock monkeys are found in literature: gift books like Monkey Love, and Friends Knock Your Socks Off; the children's novel The Secrets of Eastcliff-by-the-Sea; craft books such as Sew Cute and Collectible Sock Monkeys; and they can be seen in Tony Millionaire's graphic novel Sock Monkey, in which a sock monkey doll is the main character. There is a film adaptation of Millionaire's comic currently in the works. They are also featured in the cover art for the 1992 alternative rock album Dirty by Sonic Youth. In 2024, a complete 392-page non-fiction sock monkey history book, Red Heel Sock Monkeys: Pop Culture Icons was published; illustrated with numerous photographs and cited references.

Sock monkeys are said to be good luck charms, and as a result, people offer sock monkeys as gifts. Sock monkeys have been given to patients in hospitals as a symbol of a quick recovery. They have been given to employees to relieve stress and sent to soldiers overseas to relieve homesickness.

In February 2015, Jody Lewis of Bridgwater, Somerset UK, made the official Guinness world record for largest sock monkey made from individual socks. The sock monkey stands at 10 feet 5.59 inches.

== Festivals ==
The city of Rockford, Illinois, embraces the doll as part of its history. In 2005, Midway Village Museum in Rockford held its first "Sock Monkey Madness Festival", where sock monkey fans could view an exhibit highlighting the industrial, legal, and creative history of the Nelson red-heel sock and the sock monkey. In 2009, the annual Sock Monkey Madness Festival was awarded a national Leadership in History Award of Merit from the American Association for State and Local History for excellence in educational programming.

The Sock Monkey Madness Festival also includes the original sock monkey that helped the Nelson Knitting Company win the patent and obtain the title “Home of the Sock Monkey.” Additionally, there is a 7-foot-2-inch sock monkey named "Nelson" (he acquired his namesake after the founder of the factory, John Nelson). Nelson, the super-sized sock monkey mascot created by author/crafter Dee Lindner was sewn out of 44 Rockford red-heeled socks. Furthermore, the festival is kid friendly and has unique attractions such as the “Sockford General Hospital”. The hospital is a “crafty clinic” that repairs sock monkeys if they require any care. Volunteers dress as nurses and fix any button eyes that fall off, torn mouths, or do any other sewing that is necessary.

== See also ==
- Sock puppet – Puppet worn over the hand and upper arm
