= Cory Arcangel =

American post-conceptual artist (born 1978)

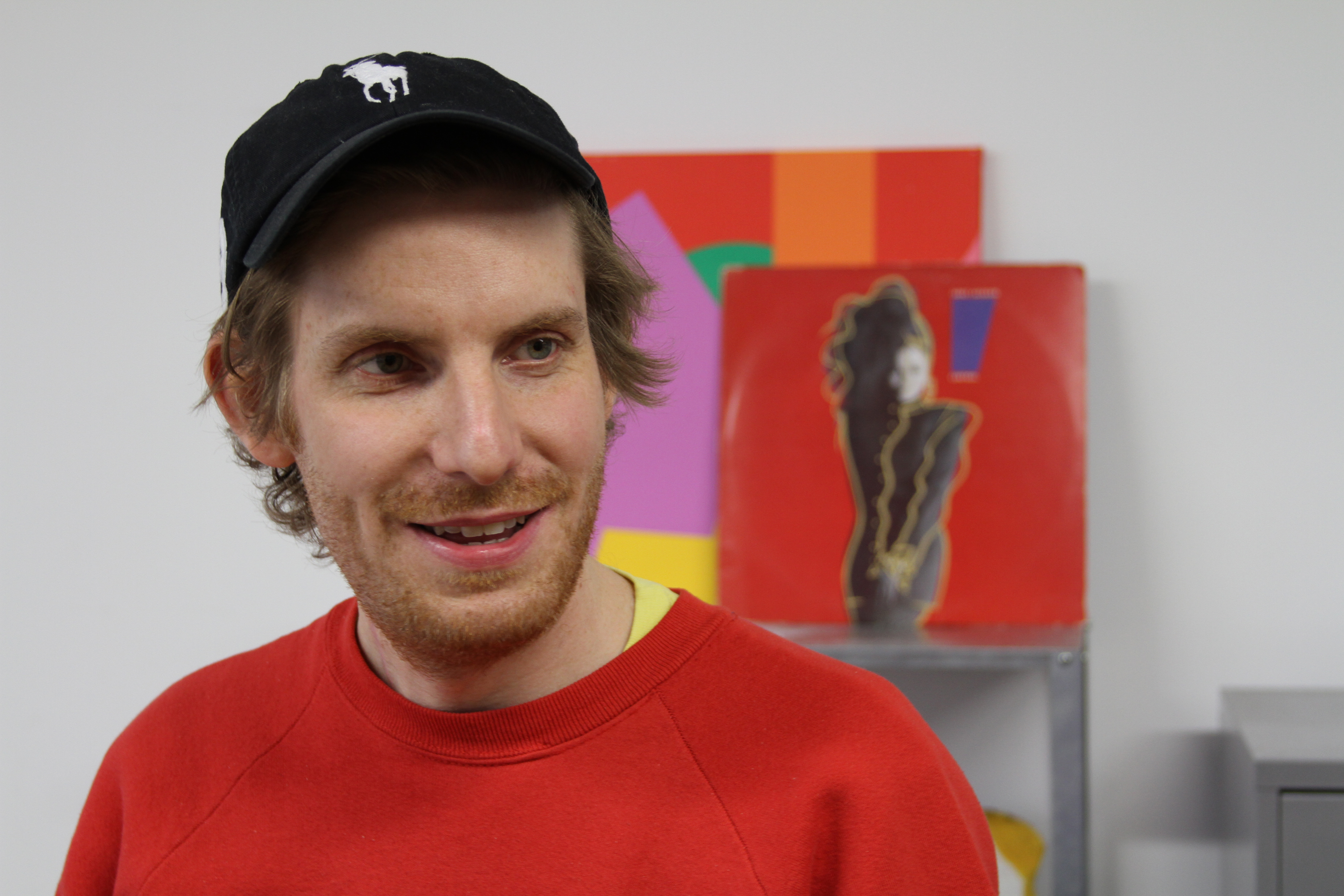
- Cory Arcangel in 2011
- Born: May 25, 1978 (age 48); Buffalo, New York
- Education: Oberlin Conservatory
- Known for: New media, digital art
- Notable work: Various Self Playing Bowling Games, I Shot Andy Warhol, Sans Simon, Sweet 16, Colors, Super Mario Movie, Super Mario Clouds, F1 Racer, a couple thousand short films about Glenn Gould
- Movement: digital art

Cory Arcangel (born May 25, 1978) is an American post-conceptual artist who makes work in many different media, including drawing, music, video, performance art, and video game modifications, for which he is best known.

Arcangel often uses the artistic strategy of appropriation, creatively reusing existing materials such as dancing stands, Photoshop gradients and YouTube videos to create new works of art. His work explores the relationship between digital technology and pop culture. He is a recipient of a 2006 Creative Capital Emerging Fields Award and the 2015 Kino der Kunst Award for Filmic Oeuvre.

== Early life ==
Arcangel grew up in Buffalo, New York and attended the Nichols School, where he was a star lacrosse goalie. He was exposed to experimental video artists such as Nam June Paik through the Squeaky Wheel Buffalo Media Arts Center. He was very interested in guitar, practicing eight hours a day by the time he turned seventeen. He studied classical guitar at the Oberlin Conservatory of Music, but later switched his major to music technology, graduating in 2000. At Oberlin, Arcangel met Jacob Ciocci and Paul B. Davis. Arcangel and Davis formed the Beige Programming Ensemble in 2000, and released a record of 8-bit music entitled "The 8-Bit Construction Set" by the age of 19. The 8-bit Construction Set was a record that was made on one side by the Commodore 64 and the other side by the Atari 800. Four people (Joe Beuckman, Joe Bonn, Paul B. Davis, and Cory Arcangel) worked on the project, which took about two years to complete.

Arcangel credits Pauline Oliveros, with whom he took a composition class, for his "fascination with finding artistic inspiration in unlikely machines". He describes a piece in which she connected sine wave oscillators to loudspeakers and output the exact audio frequency as the resonance of the concert hall, creating an increasingly louder sound. This, he says, was what made it "click" for him. Arcangel counts many among his influences, including Steve Reich, Tiger Woods, and Weekend at Bernie's.

== Works ==
=== Super Mario Clouds ===
Arcangel's best known works are his Nintendo game cartridge hacks and reworkings of obsolete computer systems of the 1970s and 80s. One example is Super Mario Clouds (2002), a modified version of the video game Super Mario Bros. for Nintendo's NES game console in which all of the game's graphics have been removed, leaving a blue background with white clouds scrolling slowly from right to left.

=== I Shot Andy Warhol ===
I Shot Andy Warhol (2002) is a modified version of the video game Hogans Alley. It is similar to the original NES game, except that the gangsters from the original have been replaced by Andy Warhol, and the "innocents" have been replaced by the Pope, Flavor Flav, and Colonel Sanders. Both the graphics and the programs were modified, a complete binary hack, but the game is downloadable for at home play.

=== Totally Fucked ===
Totally Fucked (2003) was created by modifying Super Mario Bros.. Arcangel created a world where Mario starts on a single block-cube centered in blue nothingness.

=== Pizza Party ===
Pizza Party (2004) was a free, functional software package that could be used to order Domino's Pizza through a command-line interface. The program allowed users to order pizza by typing in commands such as pizza_party -pmx 2 medium regular, which - according to the artist - would order two medium crust pizzas with pepperoni, mushrooms and extra cheese. The piece was commissioned by Eyebeam and implemented by Mike Frumin.

=== Sans Simon ===
In this 2004 single-channel video, Arcangel points the camera at a television screen that is playing a tape of the concert. Each time Paul Simon appears in the frame, Arcangel places his hand over Simon's image. The work is one of several videos, performances and lectures by Arcangel based on Simon and Garfunkel's live concerts.

=== Tetris Screwed ===
Tetris Screwed (2004) is based upon Tetris; modified to play at a very slow speed, where it takes about 8 hours for the blocks to fall in one complete game. The blocks can still be moved from left to right, but takes minutes for the blocks to fall pixel by pixel. Tetris Screwed is a binary hack, where the constant delay loop was written by hand in 6502 binary.

=== Super Mario Movie ===
In collaboration with the art collective Paper Rad, and extended from Arcangel's Totally Fucked (2003), Super Mario Movie (2005) is another modified NES Super Mario Bros. cartridge, programmed to be a 15-minute video and is available for download for an NES emulator. The video consists of a series of original 8-bit tracks, original texts and "dialogue" boxes, and a complete rework of the background images and coding via 6502 binary.

=== Punk Rock 101 ===
Punk Rock 101 (2006) is an example of Arcangel's work with the web as an artistic medium. For this piece, he re-published Kurt Cobain's alleged suicide letter alongside a series of Google Ads. The ads are tailored to the content of any given page, and the piece juxtaposed Cobain's angst with ads selling social anxiety treatment and motivational speaking. Art critic Paddy Johnson wrote of the work, "This is quite possibly the most brilliant subversion of the medium I have seen."

=== A couple thousand short films about Glenn Gould ===
In 2007, Film and Video Umbrella commissioned Arcangel to produce a new work, a couple of thousand short films about Glenn Gould, using tiny fragments of video, each containing a single note produced by various instruments (and some performing pets) to create an arrangement of Bach's Variation no. 1 (from the Goldberg Variations). To do this, he had to create his own video-editing software.

=== The Bruce Springsteen Born to Run Glockenspiel Addendum ===
Arcangel's 2007 LP is an intervention into Bruce Springsteen's 1975 album Born to Run. While the album's title track includes a glockenspiel part, many of the songs on the album do not. Arcangel created a glockenspiel part for each of these songs, releasing them on this vinyl record, which can be played in sync with Springsteen's original to add a 'missing' part to the original album. In addition to the LP, Arcangel has also performed the piece live.

=== Arcangel Surfware ===
In 2014, Arcangel founded Arcangel Surfware, a software publisher and merchandise company, alongside Bravado (a division of Universal Music Group). Notable brand releases include clothing made to be worn while surfing the internet, Arcangel's The Source zine series, and a first-time publishing of Tony Conrad's Music and the Mind of the World online. After ending the brand's relationship with Bravado and shutting down its webstore, Arcangel opened a flagship shop in Stavanger, Norway that was in operation from 2018 to 2019.

=== Lake series ===
In 2013 and 2014 Arcangel exhibited a series of 1920X1080 H.264/MPEG-4 Part 10 looped digital file from lossless Quicktime Animation master. The pieces are displayed on 70" flat screens using a media player. Pop culture images have had the outdated Java applet "lake" applied, creating the series of film images.

=== Photoshop Gradient Demonstrations ===
Arcangel's series of Photoshop Gradient Demonstrations are large, colorful prints produced using the gradient tool built into the image-processing software Adobe Photoshop. The title of each of these works describes the process by which it was made. For example, one 2008 work is titled Photoshop CS: 110 by 72 inches, 300 DPI, RGB, square pixels, default gradient "Spectrum", mousedown y=1098 x=1749.9, mouse up y=0 x=4160. With these instructions, any Photoshop user can reproduce Arcangel's abstract images on their own computer.

=== Various Self Playing Bowling Games (aka Beat the Champ) ===
Arcangel created Various Self Playing Bowling Games (aka Beat the Champ) (2011) by hacking various bowling video games (for game consoles from Atari 2600 to GameCube) to throw gutter balls. Arcangel says, "But throwing a gutter ball is just humiliating. That's what makes the piece so ridiculous, but also sad and even oppressive. The failure seems funny at first–then it flips." Art critic Charles Darwent from The Independent described the work as "complex and funny and moving." Andrea K. Scott of The New Yorker compared the piece to Bruce Nauman's "Stamping in the Studio", where he stamped in an empty room for an hour, as "a ritual of isolation and futility".

=== The AUDMCRS Underground Dance Music Collection of Recorded Sound ===
Arcangel, with the help of specialists, assembled a collection of 839 trance LPs and a corresponding catalogue in Machine Readable Cataloging standard (2012). The vinyl was originally purchased from retired trance and underground dance music disc jockey Joshua Ryan and cataloged over 2011 and 2012 in Sunset Park, Brooklyn by the Cory Arcangel fine arts studio. These records were only intended to be used whilst DJing and not listened to in a stand-alone format. Because of this, the work preserves the music featured in it by making it so far removed from its original context and purpose.

=== Asymmetrical Response ===
In military parlance, the terms asymmetrical and symmetrical are employed to refer to political provocations and diplomatic démarches, escalation and tension, and power dynamics of the highest order. Not specific to war, these terms also refer more generally to a set of relations that define our connections to power. In their first collaboration, Arcangel and Olia Lialina present complex bodies of work that arose through their continuing conversation.

== Exhibitions ==
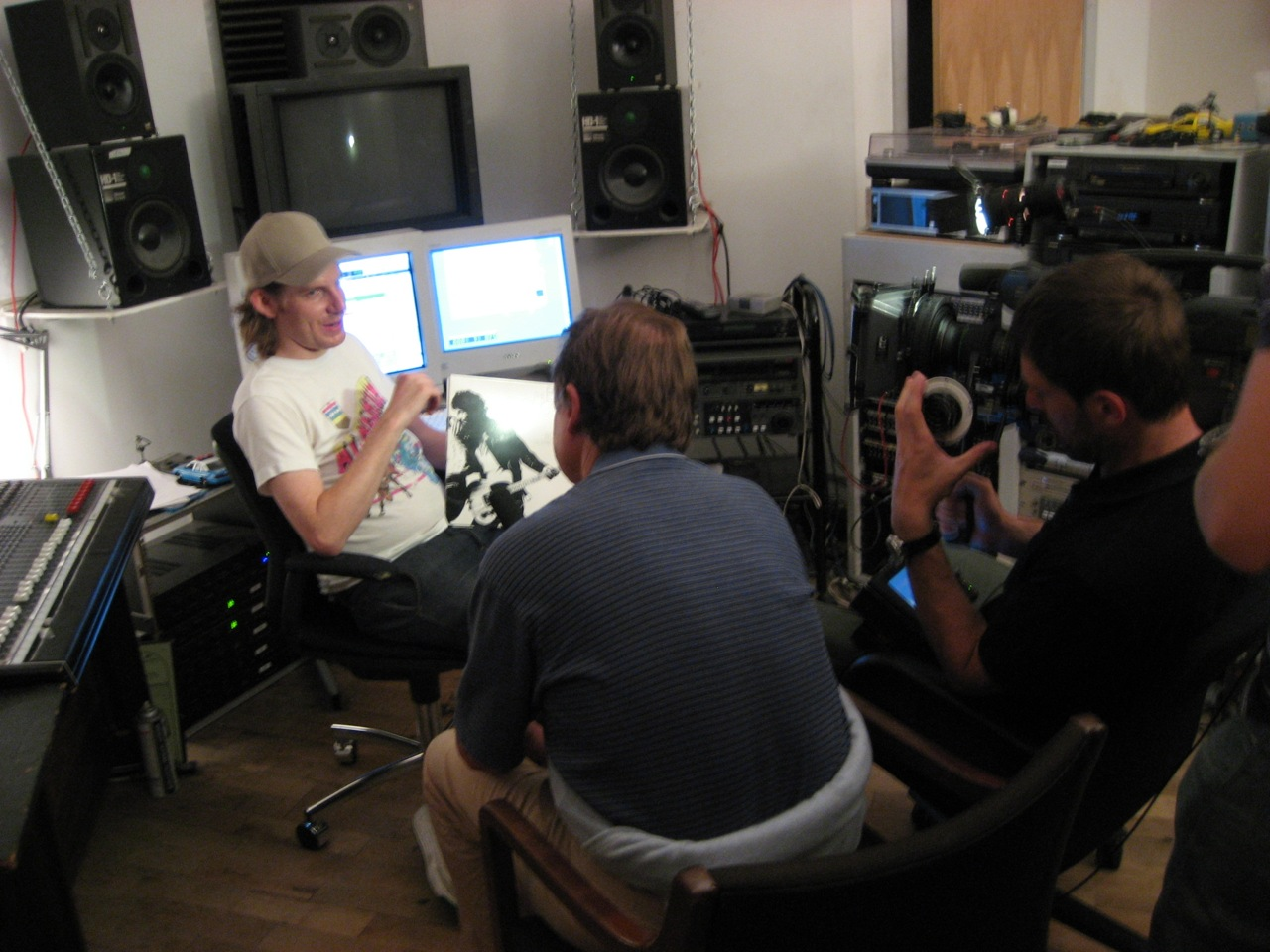
Arcangel in 2006

Arcangel's work has been subject of several solo museum exhibitions, including the Kunstverein in Hamburg in Hamburg, Germany, the CC Foundation in Shanghai, China, The Kitchen, New York, United States, Galleria D'Arte Moderna e Contemporanea di Bergamo, Bergamo, Italy, the Barbican Centre in London, England and the Migros Museum in Zürich, Switzerland, and the Museum of Contemporary Art in Chicago, Illinois. His work has also been exhibited in many places in New York City, including the Museum of Modern Art's Color Chart, the Whitney Museum, and the New Museum.

His work is included in public collections in locations such as the Whitney Museum of American Art, Miami Art Museum, Migros Museum, and Neue Nationalgalerie. Arcangel is represented by Greene Naftali Gallery in New York, Galerie Thaddaeus Ropac in Paris and Salzburg, Lisson Gallery in London, and Galerie Guy Bartschi in Geneva.

At 33, Arcangel was the youngest artist to receive an entire floor for new work with Pro Tools, his 2011 solo show at the Whitney Museum of American Art. Other notable solo shows since have been "Power Points" (2013) and "Masters" (2012). Many of his shows include a variety of old and new work from Arcangel.

Arcangel was an Eyebeam resident from 2002 to 2006.

Solo and group exhibitions of his work have been presented at major international institutions including Electric Op at the Musée d’art de Nantes and the Buffalo AKG Art Museum, Programmed Universes at MAC Lyon, and Digital Witness at LACMA. He has also participated in thematic group shows such as WORLDBUILDING: Gaming and Art in the Digital Age at the Centre Pompidou Metz and the Julia Stoschek Collection, while continuing collaborative and experimental work through venues like Rhizome @ WSA (Software as Embodied Knowledge), the Michel Majerus Estate, and Stavanger Secession (Accidents). Additional projects include performance-based installations, screenings, and lectures at institutions such as Issue Project Room, ArtCenter College of Design, Kunst Museum Winterthur, and Smilers in New York.

== Personal life ==
Arcangel lives and works in Stavanger, Norway, where he moved in 2015. He also maintains a studio in Sunset Park, Brooklyn.

Arcangel is married to Hanne Mugaas, a Norwegian curator; together, they have one child. In 2009, Arcangel was diagnosed with thyroid cancer and his treatments gave him both concentration and memory issues, completely wiping out his short-term memory for a period of time. It also temporarily affected his work, leading him to create works that he described as "hyper-structuralist" or void of "real content". His lymph nodes were removed, freeing him of the disease.
