= Nelson Knitting Company =

American hosiery manufacturer

- Industry: Hosiery manufacturing
- Founded: 1880
- Founder: John Nelson
- Defunct: 1992
- Headquarters: Rockford, Illinois, United States
- Products: Rockford Red Heel socks

The Nelson Knitting Company was an American hosiery manufacturer based in Rockford, Illinois. Founded in 1880, the company made work socks sold as Rockfords and became known for the red-heel design used in traditional sock monkeys. It remained in business until 1992.

== History ==
Swedish immigrant John Nelson settled in Rockford and worked with William Worth Burson on an automatic knitting machine that could close the heel and toe of a sock. They had developed the machine by 1872, replacing work that previously had to be finished by hand. The Nelson Knitting Company incorporated in 1880 and marketed its product as the Nelson sock and as "Celebrated Rockford Seamless Hosiery". By 1904, the factory was producing more than 5,000 pairs of work socks per day.

The company's brown-and-cream work socks became widely known as Rockfords, and other knitting mills produced similar socks. In 1932, Nelson added red yarn to the heel to distinguish its products from competitors. The feature, marketed as the De-Tec-Tip, identified authentic Rockford socks and later formed the characteristic red mouth of a sock monkey.

== Association with sock monkeys ==
The identity of the first person to make a sock monkey, and the date it was made, are not known. The toys were initially homemade, often by reusing worn Rockford socks, rather than manufactured by Nelson. In the early 1950s, the company learned that its socks were being made into stuffed monkeys. It acquired rights associated with a sock-monkey design in 1955 and began including a doll pattern in packages of Red Heel socks.

After Nelson Knitting ceased operations, Fox River Mills obtained the rights to the Red Heel sock and continued to sell the socks with sock-monkey instructions.

The company's products and their connection to sock monkeys became part of Rockford's industrial and cultural history. Midway Village Museum maintains a permanent exhibition about Nelson Knitting and its socks and has hosted the Sock Monkey Madness Festival.
