= Aqua Teen Hunger Force Colon Movie Film for Theaters =

2007 film directed by Matt Maiellaro and Dave Willis

- Theatrical release poster by Julie Bell and Boris Vallejo
- Directed by: Matt Maiellaro; Dave Willis
- Screenplay by: Matt Maiellaro; Dave Willis
- Based on: Aqua Teen Hunger Force by: Matt Maiellaro; Dave Willis
- Produced by: Dave Willis; Matt Maiellaro; Jay Wade Edwards
- Starring: Dana Snyder; Carey Means; Dave Willis; Matt Maiellaro; C. Martin Croker; Andy Merrill; Mike Schatz
- Edited by: Jay Wade Edwards (supervising editor); John Brestan; Ned Hastings; Phil Samson
- Production company: Williams Street
- Distributed by: First Look Pictures
- Release dates: April 10, 2007 (New York City); April 13, 2007 (United States)
- Running time: 85 minutes
- Country: United States
- Language: English
- Budget: $750,000
- Box office: $5.5 million

Aqua Teen Hunger Force Colon Movie Film for Theaters is a 2007 American adult animated surreal black comedy film based on the Adult Swim animated series Aqua Teen Hunger Force. The film was produced, written and directed by series creators Matt Maiellaro and Dave Willis, and features the voices of Dana Snyder, Carey Means, Willis, Maiellaro, Mike Schatz, Andy Merrill, and C. Martin Croker, with Neil Peart of the Canadian rock band Rush, Bruce Campbell, Tina Fey, Fred Armisen, and Chris Kattan in cameo appearances.

The film centers around Master Shake, Frylock and Meatwad, better known as the Aqua Teens, as they join forces with the Plutonians and the Cybernetic Ghost of Christmas Past from the Future to prevent a piece of exercise equipment from creating destruction, all while the Aqua Teens must puzzle together their existence and search for their creator.

During an interview at the 2005 San Diego Comic-Con, Maiellaro and Snyder stated that rumors of a feature-length film based on Aqua Teen Hunger Force would be made. Maiellaro would also describe the film as "an action piece that leads into the origin story that unfolds in a very 'Aqua Teen' way." As production went on, several cameos, including Peart, Armisen and Campbell, were confirmed. Adult Swim promoted the film using an extensive guerrilla marketing campaign, which included publishing alternate endings to the film onto the internet, airing a picture-in-picture version of the movie on television as part of the network’s April Fools’ Day traditions and installing handmade electronic signs in certain cities; a stunt that caused a bomb scare in the city of Boston.

Aqua Teen Hunger Force Colon Movie Film for Theaters premiered in New York City on April 10, 2007, and was released theatrically on April 13, 2007, by First Look Pictures. The film received mixed reviews from critics and grossed $5.5 million on a $750,000 budget. It marks the first and only time an Adult Swim series was adapted into a feature film theatrically, and is the second Cartoon Network-owned property to receive a theatrical feature film adaptation after The Powerpuff Girls Movie (2002), with the difference being due to that film's box office failure, Warner Bros. decided not to distribute this film's theatrical run. Warner Home Video released the film on a two-disc DVD on August 14, 2007.

A sequel titled Death Fighter was announced, but was ultimately scrapped in 2015. However, a second Aqua Teen Hunger Force film was officially confirmed by Adult Swim on May 12, 2021. The second film, titled Aqua Teen Forever: Plantasm, was released direct-to-video on November 8, 2022, and on HBO Max starting February 8, 2023.

== Plot ==
Before the main feature, a faux theatre concession stand advertisement plays. A group of anthropomorphic theater snacks sing a spoof of Let's All Go to the Lobby until they are interrupted by another snack band (performed by Mastodon). The new band proceed to loudly sing some of their own bizarre theater rules as a death metal song.

In Egypt, Master Shake, Frylock, and Meatwad break free from within the Sphinx and are attacked by an oversized poodle, who kills Frylock before Shake defeats it. Shake and Meatwad flee with Frylock's corpse and meet Time Lincoln, who revives Frylock. When the Central Intelligence Agency break into his house, Time Lincoln helps the Aqua Teens escape in a wooden rocket ship. Time Lincoln is shot and the CIA agents become slaves to an African American Kentucky Colonel as punishment for changing history. All this, however, is just an elaborate story concocted by Shake to explain their origin to Meatwad. Meanwhile, a slice of watermelon named Walter Melon, along with his accomplice; Rush drummer Neil Peart, observes events of the Aqua Teens from his watermelon spaceship, including a backyard concert performed by Meatwad and his dolls.

When Shake decides to use his new exercise machine; the Insanoflex, Frylock notices that it is not assembled properly, and the instructions cannot be found. After searching for them online, he finds a message warning not to assemble the machine. Frylock calls the website's listed phone number, which is revealed to be that of Emory and Oglethorpe, the Plutonians. Before they can answer the phone, they discover the Cybernetic Ghost of Christmas Past from the Future on board with them. The Ghost explains to the two aliens the story of the Insanoflex: the machine, when assembled, will exercise a man into a super-being, who will attract all the women on Earth, leading to a massive inbreeding and the eventual extinction of mankind. To prevent this, the Ghost traveled to the past and steals a screw that holds the machine together. The Plutonians, now determined to get the machine, point out to him that the screw could easily be replaced: someone can buy another screw or shove a pencil into the screw hole.

Back on Earth, Frylock finishes re-building the Insanoflex, with a pencil in the screw hole, but he discovers the circuit board is missing. The trio visit their neighbor Carl, from whom Shake had stolen the machine, to see if he has the missing piece. After Carl refuses to tell them, Meatwad finds the address in the Insanoflex's box. Dr. Weird, whose abandoned asylum has been purchased and turned into a condominium, is visited by Shake, Frylock, and Meatwad. Frylock retrieves the missing circuit board and installs it into the machine. Carl insists that as the rightful owner he should be the first to test the machine. The Insanoflex straps him in and transforms itself into a giant one-eyed robot. The robot plays techno music and heads for downtown Philadelphia, all while Carl's strapped-in form is forced to exercise. Eventually, the robot begins laying metallic eggs, which hatch into smaller versions of the machine. Emory, Oglethorpe and the Ghost, whom they unsuccessfully tried to steal the machine for themselves, offers to help them.

The Aqua Teens, the Plutonians and the Ghost, aided by an instructional workout video, find that the Insanoflex can be destroyed using music. After a failed encounter with MC Pee Pants, reincarnated as a fly, The team have no choice but to have Shake play his music. Shake poorly plays his original song "Nude Love" on acoustic guitar, forcing the Insanoflex to commit suicide. Carl, now extremely muscular, leaves with his newly found date, a bodybuilder named Linda, while the group tries to prevent the newly-hatched robots from destroying the city.

The Aqua Teens travel back to Dr. Weird's condo to confront him, where Frylock begins to tell the origin story of the Aqua Teens: they were created by Dr. Weird, along with a chicken nugget named Chicken Bittle. In the flashback, Dr. Weird proclaims that the Aqua Teens were created for one purpose: to crash a jet into a brick wall. Realizing the pointlessness of this mission, Frylock diverted the jet and set a course to Africa, where they would try to solve world hunger. Upon entering Africa, Bittle was killed by a lion and the presence of the Aqua Teens scares a tribe of natives. With no other solutions, they returned to the United States and rented a house in New Jersey, where they would start their new lives as regular civilians.

Meanwhile, Carl and Linda recline in her room, where she reveals "herself" to be Dr. Weird in disguise. He cuts off Carl's muscles and grafts them onto his own body. A fight ensues between Frylock and Dr. Weird, while arguing about who created whom. Dr. Weird claims that it was Frylock who created him, not the other way around. Dr. Weird shows Frylock a teddy bear filled with razor blades. He then reveals that the blue diamond on Frylock's back hides a VCR, in which a videotape with false memories of Dr. Weird creating Frylock had been playing in the latter's head. Frylock reveals himself to be a transgender lesbian trapped in a man's body. Just then, Walter Melon arrives in his ship, and explains that he created the Aqua Teens and all the other characters, including the Insanoflex. His plan was that they would kill each other and Walter would inherit their real estate in order to create the "Insano-Gym". The others inform Walter that they rent and do not own property, proving Walter's plan pointless. An irritated Walter storms off. The Teens see their alleged mother standing before them, revealed to be a nine-layer bean burrito. Shake suddenly jumps out the window upon hearing this, Meatwad hugs her, and Frylock states, "That's neat". The theatre snacks return to sing a song mocking the audience as the film abruptly cuts to the credits.

In a post-credit scene, the Ghost is seen humping the TV in the Aqua Teens' living room. Then Frylock (who went through a sex change) tells him that it's time for bed.

== Cast ==
- Dana Snyder as Master Shake, the de facto leader of the ATHF, a talking milkshake
- Carey Means as Frylock, the smartest of the ATHF, a talking box of fries able to fire beams from his eyes
- Dave Willis as
  - Meatwad, the most childlike of the ATHF, a talking chunk of hamburger meat with shape-shifting abilities
  - Carl, the ATHF's neighbor
  - Ignignokt, the large green Mooninite
  - Video Game Voice
- Matt Maiellaro as
  - Err, the small magenta Mooninite
  - Cybernetic Ghost of Christmas Past from the Future, a large robotic duck claiming to see thousands of years into the past
  - Satan, the devil
- Andy Merrill as Oglethorpe, the fat, orange Plutonian with the German accent
- Mike Schatz as Emory, the skinny, green Plutonian alien with a headband
- C. Martin Croker as
  - Dr. Weird, a mindless mad scientist who created many creatures, including the ATHF
  - Steve, Dr. Weird's assistant
- Bruce Campbell as Chicken Bittle, the original leader of the ATHF who is long deceased
- Neil Peart as himself
- Chris Kattan as Walter Melon, the scheming melon waiting to take over Dr. Weirds and the ATHF's assets
- MC Chris as MC Pee Pants, a rapping 8 foot spider in a diaper who constantly winds up in Hell and is sent back to Earth
- Fred Armisen as Time Lincoln, the 16th US president who helps the ATHF escape the 19th Century
- George Lowe as Space Ghost
- Isaac Hayes III as Plantation Owner
- Tina Fey as Burrito, a large bean burrito claiming to be the mother of the ATHF
- H. Jon Benjamin as CIA Agent 1
- Jon Glaser as CIA Agent 2
- Craig Hartin as Rob Goldstein
- Matt Harrigan as Linda, a muscular woman who Carl is seeing, turned out to be Dr. Weird in disguise
- Mastodon (uncredited) as Interrupting Snack Band, a gumdrop at the mic, a pretzel on the guitar, a box of candy on the bass, and nachos on the drums

== Production ==
=== Development ===
In an interview at the 2005 San Diego Comic-Con, Dana Snyder and Matt Maiellaro confirmed rumors that there would be a feature-length movie of Aqua Teen Hunger Force. More details were revealed at the 2005 Paley Television Festival, such as a possible cameo appearance by 80s funk group Cameo, and Maiellaro described it as "an action piece that leads into an origin story that unfolds in a very 'Aqua Teen' way."

The creators revealed much more information in an interview with Wizard Entertainment. While they dodged many questions, they confirmed that the film would run 80 minutes, be produced on a meager $750,000 budget, and feature a plot detail about a "lost Aqua Teen", who is a large chicken nugget named "Chicken Bittle" (voiced by Bruce Campbell). They also confirmed more cameos, with Rush drummer and lyricist Neil Peart, voice actor H. Jon Benjamin and his comedy partner Jon Glaser, and Saturday Night Live's Fred Armisen making appearances. Heavy metal band Mastodon stated in a Decibel article that they would be performing during the opening, and that the band would be animated as a bucket of popcorn, a soda, a hot dog, and a candy bar. They were actually animated as a pretzel, a pile of nachos, an "Icecaps" box, and a gumdrop. Radical Axis provided animation services to the film as with the series.

=== Music ===
Aqua Teen Hunger Force Colon Movie Film for Theaters Colon the Soundtrack

Soundtrack album by Various Artists
- Released: April 10, 2007
- Recorded: 2007
- Genres: Alternative rock; hard rock; heavy metal; rap rock
- Length: 44:25
- Label: Williams Street
- Producer: Various Artists

Aqua Teen Hunger Force music chronology
Aqua Teen Hunger Force Colon Movie Film for Theaters Colon the Soundtrack (2007)	Have Yourself a Very Meaty Christmas (2009)

Professional ratings
Review scores
Source	Rating
AllMusic	3.5/5 stars

Aqua Teen Hunger Force Colon Movie Film for Theaters Colon the Soundtrack was released on April 10, 2007. It features many previously unreleased songs, some recorded for the purpose of the album. In addition, the compilation features an intro/outro titled "Nude Love" by Master Shake, a track from MC Chris, film skits and sound bites, and a new rendition of the Aqua Teen Hunger Force theme by rapper Schoolly D.

The album features mix of musical styles ranging from heavy metal, indie rock and hip-hop; and also features new, original music from Mastodon, Killer Mike and Unearth. Noticeably missing is "In the Air Tonight" by Phil Collins, which prominently features at the end of the film.

1. Master Shake – "Nude Love" – 1:27
2. Soda Dog Refreshment Squad – "Groovy Time for a Movie Time" – 0:48
3. Mastodon – "Cut You Up With a Linoleum Knife" – 1:50
4. Early Man – "More to Me Than Meat and Eyes" – 3:11
5. Schoolly D – "Aqua Teen Hunger Force Theme" (Remix) – 1:34
6. Meatwad – Skit – 0:18
7. Unearth – "The Chosen" – 3:50
8. Andrew W.K. – "Party Party Party" – 1:56
9. Carl Brutananadilewski – Skit – 0:15
10. Nine Pound Hammer – "Carl's Theme" – 2:42
11. Brass Castle – "Bookworm Resin" – 3:34
12. Master Shake – Skit – 0:22
13. Killer Mike – "Blam Blam" – 6:12
14. Insane-O-Flex – "I Like Your Booty (But I'm Not Gay)" – 2:04
15. mc chris – "I Want Candy" – 2:03
16. The Hold Steady – "Girls Like Status" – 2:43
17. Master Shake – "Nude Love (Reprise)" – 9:28
  - features hidden tracks
    - Meatwad and Superchunk – "Misfits and Mistakes"
    - Master Shake and Nashville Pussy – "Face Omelet"
    - Carl – Skit
    - Matt Maiellaro – Guitar Solo

Note: Carey Means (Frylock) is absent from the skits, sound bites and hidden tracks where the other Aqua Teens can be heard. Regardless, Carey Means still portrays Frylock in the film.

== Marketing ==
The film's poster was illustrated by Julie Bell and Boris Vallejo, and parodies the "King of the Mountain" design.

=== Boston Mooninite panic ===
On January 31, 2007, police in Boston, Massachusetts received reports of devices resembling bombs in various places around the city. The devices turned out to be electronic signs similar to a Lite-Brite that displayed images of the Mooninites Ignignokt and Err giving the finger, and were designed to promote the Aqua Teen Hunger Force television show as part of a guerrilla marketing campaign authorized by Cartoon Network. The boards were present in several cities for weeks before the ones in Boston were reported.

The Boston City Government sought a reimbursement for the money spent responding to the incident. The amount quoted was $500,000 initially, and then was increased to $750,000.

On February 5, it was announced that Turner Broadcasting and the city of Boston have reached an agreement to pay $2 million to offset the cost of removing the devices: $1 million to cover the cost of the agencies involved and an additional $1 million in goodwill funding to homeland security.

An episode from season five titled "Boston" was produced as the series creators' response to the scare, but Adult Swim pulled it to avoid further controversy surrounding the events of the bomb scare.

=== April Fools' Day television "premiere" ===
The heavily promoted April 1, 2007, airing of the movie on Adult Swim muted and featured in a picture-in-picture screen in the bottom left hand corner during a simultaneous airing of the Family Guy episode "Peter's Two Dads", while a large and noisy on-screen graphic of Master Shake promotes the movie's airing.

Adult Swim began running advertisements on March 25, 2007, advertising the television premiere of the movie the following Sunday, April 1, 2007. Its only reasoning behind this stunt, as stated in the advertisement, was "because we're fucking crazy". While Adult Swim's TV listings on its website stated the movie would be shown, other TV listings reported the same Sunday block. The stunt was, in actuality, yet another one of Adult Swim's annual April Fools' pranks: though the first few minutes of the movie were shown normally, the remainder was shown in a small picture-in-picture box in the bottom left-hand corner, with no sound, over the normal programming and occasional giant pop-ups alerting viewers of its presence, as well as advertising the actual premiere. The advertising was shown again on one episode of a Family Guy marathon on July 6, 2007. The movie eventually was shown in full on Sunday, March 30, 2008. The day after the April Fools' joke, Cartoon Network showed another bumper, stating, "Sorry you will still have to pay to actually see the movie. But thanks for the ratings!"

=== Fake endings ===
In yet another promotional stunt, the "ending" to the movie was posted in various places including YouTube, KingColon.com (in the Worst Game Ever game), and fansite "Aqua Teen Central": each ending was completely different.

Eventually, the Adult Swim website let it be known that none of the "endings" were real and presented seven more clips (which were fake as well) throughout the weeks following the film's release.

These endings, now called the "fake.com endings", are available on the film's "Extras" DVD on the 2-disc collector's edition. These endings are parodies of other films. For example, one of the endings spoofs The Terminator, featuring Meatwad as "The Determinator".

== Release ==
=== Home media ===
Warner Home Video released Aqua Teen Hunger Force Colon Movie Film for Theaters in a two-disc DVD edition on August 14, 2007. For the DVD release, the studio changed the title of the eighty-seven-minute full-length movie to Aqua Teen Hunger Force Colon Movie Film for Theaters for DVD, just like the film soundtrack's title. The DVD features include the ten fake endings as shown on the internet, a "making of" featurette, promos, the "Deleted Scenes" episode, a music video, and an eighty-minute animatic (rough cut) of the movie made out of the deleted scenes from the film and scenes from the "Deleted Scenes" episode as well as a commentary. Rock and Roll Hall of Fame inductee Patti Smith is featured on the DVD commentary. The scene after the credits was removed from the UK DVD release.

The set also features the season four episode "Deleted Scenes" (also known as "Star-Studded Xmas Spectacular"), which makes heavy references and parallels to the film that originally aired years prior to the film's release on December 18, 2005.

The film is also available in HD and SD on iTunes Store, Amazon Prime Video, and Microsoft Movies & TV.

== Reception ==
=== Box office ===
The film was a box office success, earning $3,088,000 in its opening weekend at no. 13. It grossed $5,520,368 domestically against its $750,000 budget.

=== Critical response ===
With 28 reviews compiled, Metacritic reported that Movie Film for Theaters has received an average rating of 54/100, indicating "mixed or average" reviews. Rotten Tomatoes gave the film an approval rating of 49% based on reviews from 82 critics, with an average rating of 5.4/10. The website's consensus states: "The non sequitur humor of Aqua Teen Hunger Force will surely appeal to its built-in fanbase, but for the uninitiated, the premise wears thin". Reviews ranged from Glenn Kenny at Premiere magazine, who stated that he was tempted to refer to the film as "the most successful full-on surrealist film since Buñuel and Dalí's 1930 L'Age d'Or", to Ty Burr of The Boston Globe, who called it "an act of terrorism against entertainment". The film was given a thumbs down on the television show At the Movies with Ebert & Roeper; Richard Roeper criticized the runtime and calling it "unfunny", though he said the first five minutes were funny.

In response to such reviews, a commercial featuring the Mooninites began airing during the Adult Swim block. The two characters spend the entire commercial insulting a supposedly typical reviewer, "Lionel" of lionellovesmovies.com (the site merely leads back to the movie page). Other commercials recommend people see the film two or three more times to push the box office numbers up. Adult Swim also mentioned in one of its commercial bumpers that the review situation highlights the generation gap, and that most negative reviews came from much older critics.

== Sequel ==
There has been mention of producing a sequel titled Death Fighter. While little has been confirmed by Adult Swim in regards to the film, there have been many statements regarding it. On December 15, 2008, Dave Willis stated no script was written and that the film would be released in Spring 2009 (though, as he also stated that Death Fighter was a T-shirt he was working on, he likely wasn't being serious) Following this, in an April 2009 interview, Dave joked about the film lacking any sort of funding and being sold out of the back of his car. In a 2010 interview, staff members of Radical Axis confirmed that a sequel was indeed in production, and mentioned the possibility that the film might be made in 3D. When asked if the film was designed for a theatrical release, a Radical Axis staff member responded yes, but stated: "We're not sure if we have a distributor yet." This was then followed by the statement: "Adult Swim will never make another movie ever again." In 2012, Matt Maiellaro released more news regarding the film, that being: "It is all written and great. We are just trying to convince the network do it again. The first one was such a cash cow for them, not just box office but also ad sales in the movie. So it is kind of a no-brainer. So hopefully one day."

By 2014, the script had been completed and approved and would be released somewhere in mid 2015 and jokingly stated that the film was shelved as it was not G-rated; however, on April 25, 2015, at a C2CE convention panel, Willis indirectly stated that the project was scrapped, soon after announcing the show's cancellation. He later mentioned on Reddit that it would cost $3.4 million to produce, and expressed interest in doing a Kickstarter to fund it. He also reportedly stated that the film could potentially be released in the next 2 years.

On May 12, 2021, Adult Swim announced a second Aqua Teen Hunger Force film, as well as original films based on The Venture Bros. and Metalocalypse. All three films will be released on Blu-ray, DVD, and PVOD before arriving on HBO Max three months later. The film released on November 8, 2022, as Aqua Teen Forever: Plantasm. A preview of the film was shown at Adult Swim Fest 2022.

== See also ==
- List of adult animated feature films
- List of American films of 2007
