= Tim Maloney =

American filmmaker and animator

Tim Maloney is an American filmmaker and animator who has made films for the band Negativland, the Walt Disney Company, and the Los Angeles County Museum of Art.

He is the creator of Cat-Head Theatre, which is included in the DVD compilation of animated short films, God Hates Cartoons. He is a producer for the company that released that DVD, Bright Red Rocket. He also produced, edited and composed music for The Naked Cosmos, a 4-part TV show directed and starring Gilbert Hernandez, co-creator of "Love and Rockets."

In 2008, Tim Maloney wrote "Get Animated! Creating Professional Cartoon Animation on Your Home Computer." In it, Maloney aims to share his low-budget, lone-wolf secrets to getting high-quality animation out of everyday equipment and software. This book, published by Watson-Guptill, contains a DVD with tutorials and other information to support the material in the book.

Tim Maloney teaches film at California State University, Fullerton.
