= Brass Castle (band) =

U.S. Georgian rock band

- Origin: Atlanta, Georgia, United States
- Genres: Noise rock
- Years active: 2000~present
- Labels: Velocette Records
- Members: Chris Strawn; Christian Gordy
- Website: Brass Castle Official Website

Brass Castle (formed 2000) is a rock band from Atlanta, Georgia. Brass Castle's debut album, Get On Fire was released in 2003, followed by their self-titled release on Velocette Records in 2006. Their music is self-described as "drunk people in flames occasionally extinguished by some smooth sailin' yacht jock's salty breezes." They contributed the song "Bookworm Resin" to the Aqua Teen Hunger Force Colon Movie Film for Theaters. In 2008, Chris Strawn released the solo cd I Left My Hat In Hades and helped form the band Glen Iris, while Christian Gordy formed the clothing company CHZCKE Industries which released a Bigfoot Memorial t-shirt. He currently plays bass in the Brooklyn band Cheeseburger. They have also scored music for the Adult Swim cartoon called "The Drinky Crow Show" and donated the track "Sinister Thunderbird" to the Atlanta compilation lp We No Fun (2010). Their latest album Cancer Daze was recorded at Chase Park Transduction in Athens by former Georgia Bulldog kicker Billy Bennett. It is available on the internet.

== Band members ==
- Chris Strawn
- Christian Gordy

== Discography ==
- 2001 - John Derek 7" e.p. (Drazzig Records)
- 2003 - Get On Fire (Drazzig Records)
- 2006 - Brass Castle (Velocette Records)
- 2007 - "Bookworm Resin" (from Aqua Teen Hunger Force Colon Movie Film for Theaters Soundtrack) (Williams Street)
- 2010 - "Sinister Thunderbird" (from the We No Fun compilation)
- 2010 - Cancer Daze (digital album) (Dirty Slacks)
