= Mirari Films =

American animation and special effects company

- Formerly: Tiny Creatures
- Industry: 3D / 2D Animation; Visual effects
- Genre: Entertainment
- Founded: 1999; 27 years ago
- Founder: Eric Kaplan
- Headquarters: Los Angeles, California, U.S. Brașov, Romania; New York City

Mirari Films (stylized as MIRARI Films, formerly known as Tiny Creatures) is an American animation and special effects company based in Los Angeles, with facilities in Brașov, Romania and New York City. In 2022, the Romanian studio closed down. Many of the employees would move onto other animation facilities, including Bento Box, ShadowMachine and Titmouse.

== Filmography ==
=== TV shows ===
Shows	Channel(s)	Year
The Adventures of Baxter and McGuire	Comedy Central	2006
The Adventures of Digger and Friends	Fox Sports	2009
The Drinky Crow Show	Adult Swim	2007: pilot; 2008–2009
The Gnoufs	Foxtel, ABC	2004
Hey It's Fluffy!	Comedy Central	2012-2014
King Star King	Adult Swim	2013: pilot only.
Mongo Wrestling Alliance	Adult Swim	2011
Pair of Kings	Disney XD	2010–2013
The Problem Solverz	Cartoon Network	2011–2013
The Spheriks	MBC TV	2002
The Love Me Cat Show	YouTube	2013–2014

=== Shorts/Pilots ===
- Cute Attack
- The Mooch
- Big Mouth (Pilot for Nickelodeon)
- Disgusting People (Pilot for Fox Broadcasting Company)
- Smart Animals (Pilot for The Walt Disney Company)
- Who’s Your Daddy (Pilot for MTV)
