= Mongo Wrestling Alliance =

- Genre: Comedy
- Created by: Tommy Blacha
- Voices of: Pamela Adlon; Tommy Blacha; Eric Kaplan; Byron Minns; Jason Nash; Georgette Perna; Will Sasso; Billy West; Harry Dean Stanton
- Composers: Roger Neill; Felix Brenner
- Countries of origin: United States; Romania
- Original language: English
- No. of episodes: 10

Production
- Executive producers: Tommy Blacha; Eric Kaplan
- Producers: Raduca Kaplan; Jukka Montonen
- Editors: Paul D. Calder; Joe Gressis; John Bryant; Jukka Montonen
- Running time: 11 minutes
- Production companies: Mirari Films; Williams Street

Original release
- Network: Adult Swim
- Release: January 23 – July 31, 2011

Mongo Wrestling Alliance is an adult animated comedy series which aired on Cartoon Network's late night programming block Adult Swim. Produced by Metalocalypse co-creator Tommy Blacha, the show is set in the world of professional wrestling and features the voices of Pamela Adlon, Tommy Blacha, Will Sasso, Billy West, and Harry Dean Stanton. The series premiered on January 23, 2011, with character designs by Ed Piskor. The series combines flash animation with CGI.

== Episodes ==
No.	Title	Directed by	Written by	Original release date	Prod. code
1	"Behold The Mongo Wrestling Alliance"	Larry Guterman and Eric Pringle	Tommy Blacha	January 23, 2011	101
Rusty Kleberkuh graduates college (by force) and becomes a professional wrestler. After working his way through West Valley Championship Wrestling, he's called up to the Mongo Wrestling Alliance where he hopes to avenge his grandfather, long ago betrayed by the MWA's booker.
2	"To Trap a Giant"	Larry Guterman and Eric Pringle	Tommy Blacha	January 30, 2011	102
The Kleberkuh family and Johnny Dubose both court Rusty's newest find, the gigantic dimwitted hillbilly Booter Lee Bogg.
3	"Baron vs. Johnny"	Bill Kopp	Tommy Blacha	February 6, 2011	106
After meeting in the desert to discuss business, Johnny Dubose and Baron Kleberkuh are mistakenly presumed dead.
4	"Mongo Mexico"	Larry Guterman and Eric Pringle	Tommy Blacha	February 13, 2011	104
Balthazar Kleberkuh runs away to Mexico and gets involved with a cult.
5	"Brianna Beautiful Butt Ballerina"	Leo Riley	Tommy Blacha, Eric Kaplan, and Mike Yank	June 19, 2011	108
After a ballet performance is struck by a disaster involving Booter, Rusty attempts to court the interest of a snobby ballerina.
6	"Presumed Imbecile"	Eduard Ersek	Tommy Blacha and Eric Kaplan	June 26, 2011	103
Rusty is framed for murder.
7	"The Mute Cacophony of Death"	Eduard Ersek	Kirill Baru and Eric Zimmerman	July 10, 2011	110
Rusty and the guys are forced to wrestle mutant freaks from the swamps of Louisiana.
8	"Rusty Quits Wrasslin'"	Eduard Ersek	Mike Yank	July 17, 2011	105
Rusty quits wrestling and becomes a health-supplement salesman.
9	"Shrimp Frenzy"	Eric Pringle and Eduard Ersek	Sam Means	July 24, 2011	109
"Black Stack" Johnson opens a seafood restaurant.
10	"Nekro Nurses"	Leo Riley	Tommy Blacha	July 31, 2011	107
In an attempt to lose weight, Balthazar goes to a doctor who puts him in a coma.
