= Sock Monkey =

Comic book series by Tony Millionaire

Cover of Sock Monkey Volume 1, Number 1

Sock Monkey is a series of comics and illustrated books written and drawn by the American cartoonist Tony Millionaire.

== Description ==
Sock Monkey relates the adventures of the titular sock monkey, named Uncle Gabby, and a plush crow named Mr. Crow. Despite being toys, they are able to move, think, talk, and eat, as are most of the other toys in the series. The books are notable for their intricate artwork, dark humor, and quaint, vaulted dialogue. The inspiration for books' detailed settings come from Millionaire's childhood memories of his grandparents' Victorian house. In contrast to the scabrous humor of his weekly comic strip Maakies, Millionaire has said that "Sock Monkey is me trying to rise above all that bullshit, to be more poetic, looking at the bright side, remembering the things that used to delight me as a child." At the same time, "the main theme to all the Sock Monkey books is the crashing of innocent fantasy into bone-crushing reality."

== Books ==
Four volumes of black-and-white Sock Monkey comics have been published; each volume consists of two issues. Volume 3 won the 2001 Eisner Award for Best Humor Publication. Volume 4 featured one issue drawn in charcoal, as opposed to the ink of the other issues, and another issue in which the character designs were changed dramatically. These comics have also been collected in two trade paperbacks, each containing two volumes: The Adventures of Tony Millionaire's Sock Monkey (2000) and The Collected Works of Tony Millionaire's Sock Monkey (2004). As of late 2006 a four-issue Sock Monkey miniseries featuring an extended story titled "The Inches Incident" is being released one issue at a time.

In addition to the Sock Monkey comics, Millionaire has also produced five other Sock Monkey books. Sock Monkey: A Children's Book (2001) and Sock Monkey: The Glass Doorknob (2002) mix comics with illustrated prose. Sock Monkey: Uncle Gabby (2004), That Darn Yarn (2005), and Little and Large (2005) are full-color, hardcover comic books. That Darn Yarn and Little and Large are both 36 pages and read much more like children's storybooks than Millionaire's other Sock Monkey comics.

The 8 issues ("Heaven", "Borneo", "Dollhouse", "The Trumbernick", "The Hunters", "A Baby Bird", "The Oceanic Society", and "Heartbreak"), "The Inches Incident", Sock Monkey: The Glass Doorknob, and Sock Monkey: Uncle Gabby have been published together by Fantagraphics Books, Inc. in a volume known as Sock Monkey Treasury (2014).

Millionaire also published an 80-page illustrated story with co-author Matt Danner under Fantagraphics Books, Inc. called Sock Monkey Into The Deep Woods (2014). This book re-tells the story of Uncle Gabby's origins (previously seen in Sock Monkey: A Children's Book), along with an adventure shared by Uncle Gabby, Mr. Crow, and Inches. Sock Monkey: A Children's Book and Sock Monkey Into The Deep Woods are both illustrated literature, as opposed to Millionaire's usual comics. While Sock Monkey: A Children's Book alternates between a page of text and illustration, Sock Monkey Into The Deep Woods has small illustrations interspersed throughout the prose.

All the Sock Monkey books are published by Dark Horse Comics. Dark Horse also sells a variety of Sock Monkey merchandise including stationery, t-shirts and figurines.

== Audience ==
Though the titles, format, and general ambience of the Sock Monkey books are strongly reminiscent of classic children's literature and picture books, Millionaire has emphasized that "some of the Sock Monkey books I do are for kids, and some are definitely not." He describes them as being "based on kids' books. They're for adults who remember and love great old kids' books."

== Recurring characters ==
Uncle Gabby: A sock monkey with a hat and a penchant for poetry. He is curious and eager to help others. Together with his friend Mr. Crow he cooks up various schemes, such as going on a salamander hunt or match-making for a widowed mouse, which tend to lead to unforeseen calamity. He is loosely connected to the character of the same name in Maakies.

Mr. Crow: A plush crow with buttons for eyes. He has a fondness for alcohol, and is generally more brash and excitable than Uncle Gabby. Unaware that he is not a real bird, he occasionally attempts (and fails) to fly, and does not understand why other crows are not friendly toward him. Though ostensibly an alternate version of Drinky Crow from Maakies, in the Sock Monkey stories he is referred to as "Mr. Crow" or simply "Crow," never "Drinky."

Ann-Louise: The young girl whose home is the starting point of most of the stories (although the house itself is drawn differently each time). She owns Uncle Gabby, whom she treats very dearly, as well as most of the other toys. It is unclear whether or not she owns Mr. Crow; in the first issue he is depicted as living in the house next door, but in others he seems to live with Ann-Louise.

Inches: A small doll with an egotistic, inconsiderate, and bellicose personality.

== Adaptation ==
In 2014, Millionaire and animator Matt Danner created an proof-of-concept short to promote an upcoming live-action/animated feature. The film, to be written and directed by Danner, would be based on the storybook Sock Monkey Into the Deep Woods. As of April 2017, they were shopping around Hollywood to find investors interested in the film.
