= God Hates Cartoons =

God Hates Cartoons is a DVD compilation of animated shorts by a variety of artists produced by Bright Red Rocket. The cartoons include works by Ivan Brunetti, Sam Henderson, Walt Holcombe, Kaz, Tim Maloney, Lance Myers, Tony Millionaire, Mark Newgarden and Jim Woodring.

One of the cartoons, Diaper Dyke was accepted by Spike and Mike's Festival of Animation, but after one screening in Chicago, they found it even too sick and twisted for them and promptly removed it from their program. Four of Tony Millionaire's popular Maakies cartoons (one of which aired on Saturday Night Live) are also included in the DVD.
