= The Adventures of Digger and Friends =

2009 American series of vignettes

- Genre: Sketch comedy
- Created by: NASCAR
- Voices of: Eric Bauza; Haley Mancini
- Theme music composer: Keith Urban
- Composer: Keith Urban
- Country of origin: United States
- No. of episodes: 5

Production
- Running time: 2 minutes
- Production company: Fox Sports

Original release
- Release: 2009

The Adventures of Digger and Friends is a series of animated vignettes that showed during NASCAR on Fox pre-race shows during the 2009 NASCAR season.

== Background ==
In 2009, Fox Sports announced that "Digger", who had already been a mascot for the corner camera in NASCAR, would be the subject of a series of vignettes that would air during NASCAR on Fox pre-races.

Keith Urban composed a new single for the show, called "Lil' Digger". In an interview, Urban was noticeably happy with creating the song, saying "How could you turn the critter down? I immediately went to my drum machine, then to my guitar, back to my drum machine and on to my banjo and it wasn't long before I had the song. I just hope that Digger likes it."

Romanian animation studio Mirari Films animated the series.

The character of Digger also made a brief cameo in the 2009 film Alvin and the Chipmunks: The Squeakquel; the character is briefly seen when a lead character's car zooms past him on a busy street, prompting him to joke, "Feels like I'm back at the racetrack!"

== Characters ==
- Digger (Eric Bauza): A gopher obsessed with NASCAR racing. Frequently causes mischief at the racetrack, causing Lumpy to chase him.
- Annie (Haley Mancini): Digger's girlfriend.
- Marbles: Digger's friend.
- Gramps: Digger's grandpa and a fan of NASCAR since the beginnings of the sport.
- Lumpy Wheels: A security guard who constantly chases Digger for causing mischief at the track.

== Premise ==
The series follows Digger's life, and adventures in a racetrack with his friend, Marbles, his girlfriend, Annie, his grandpa, Gramps, and a police officer that chases Digger's mischievous acts, Lumpy Wheels, who was named after former Fox Sports president David Hill and former Charlotte Motor Speedway general manager Humpy Wheeler.

== Criticism ==
After a NASCAR town hall-style meeting at the end of May 2009, Fox Sports chair David Hill reported receiving an email from a high-ranking NASCAR official whose identity he chose to conceal, stating that Digger could have been the cause of ratings declines for Fox's NASCAR coverage. (Even though this occurred a few years into a lengthy period of NASCAR television ratings decline that is still ongoing.) Hill said "It was because of Digger that people were turning off in droves because they couldn't stand it, I said, I'm so sorry. If I'd known, I never would have created him. I didn't realize how insidious he was. It's the biggest crock of shit I've ever heard."

The criticism led to Fox Sports slowly phasing out the character in 2010; it was completely removed from their broadcasts by the time the 2012 Subway Fresh Fit 500 aired which was the second race of the 2012 NASCAR Sprint Cup Series season.

== Episodes ==
No.	Title	Original release date
1	"The Sponsor"	2009
Digger is wishing to race, as he has both cars and skills. However, Gramps tells Digger that he still needs a sponsor to race. Later, Marbles tells Digger that he was able to find a sponsor, but the catch is that the sponsor is a pest control company. Annie tries to convince Digger not to give in to the sponsor, but Digger eventually does shoots of commercials for the company. Eventually, after many failed takes, Digger dumps the company and Gramps finds a turnip company to instead to sponsor Digger, much to the liking of Digger.
2	"Picnic Trick"	2009
Digger is watching a NASCAR race when Annie interrupts him, with Annie wanting to go on a date with Digger. Digger eventually takes Annie out on a picnic date on the middle of the infield of a racetrack. Digger is constantly distracted by cars racing around the track, causing mishaps to occur. Lumpy eventually comes out and starts to chase the two with a fire hose, with Lumpy eventually getting caught in the fire hose and getting tangled by the hose. The episode ends with the date finally having gone well, with the two having lunch over the stuck body of Lumpy.
3	"NASCAR Is the King"	2009
Digger's cousin from France comes over to visit, and seduces Annie with trying to convince her that Formula One is better than NASCAR. Digger and his cousin eventually get into a singing battle, which eventually leads to a car race in where his cousin crashes into a tree, with the episode ending with Digger and Marbles saying that NASCAR is better than Formula One.
4	"Hole Lotta Trouble"	2009
Lumpy's boss screams at Lumpy to fill in potholes in the infield of the racetrack, as otherwise he'll be fired. Digger hears in on the conversation, and decides to dig holes on the track. Digger starts making holes near Lumpy, with Lumpy frantically running to fill each hole. Lumpy grabs a monkey wrench to hit Digger with, but fails to hit Digger each time he tries. After luring Digger into his hands with a NASCAR ticket, Lumpy realizes that he has forgotten to filled in all the holes. Assuming he's fired, Lumpy is surprised to hear that his boss has complimented him for how clear the grass is. The ground eventually suctions into Lumpy, with Digger running away with the ticket.
5	"Channel Digger"	2009
Lumpy is relaxing during a race when Digger sets up camera over the ground, with Lumpy proceeding to chase Digger. Digger ends up at both the NASCAR and NASCAR on FOX trailers, where the two chase each other through the tents. Digger eventually escapes in a hauler and locks himself in the Hollywood Hotel. Digger then changes the camera views to all corner shots or "Digger Cams". Lumpy tries to get into the Hollywood Hotel before being stopped by Darrell Waltrip. Lumpy finally gets in by using dynamite, and brings Digger in to see the NASCAR on FOX boss. The boss seems to berate him for the loss of ratings within humans, but then proceeds to praise Digger for the rise of ratings within gophers, and hires Digger.
