= Fox River Mills =

American sock manufacturer

- Type: Private
- Industry: Hosiery
- Founded: 1900; 126 years ago
- Defunct: October 10, 2025; 10 months ago
- Fate: Acquired by Nester Hosiery
- Headquarters: Osage, Iowa, U.S.
- Products: Socks
- Website: www.foxsox.com

Fox River Mills, Inc., was a sock manufacturer based in Osage, Iowa that operated for 125 years from 1900 to 2025. In 1992, they purchased the Nelson Knitting Company of Rockford, Illinois, and in the process acquired the trademark for the Red Heel socks commonly used to make sock monkeys. Fox River Mills includes instructions for making a sock monkey in every packet of Red Heel socks.

Fox River Mills is also known for their odor-controlling X-Static sock liners and their line of organic wool socks.

In November 2016, Fox River Mills, was acquired by the Texas private equity firm LongWater Opportunities from the family that had owned it for over four decades. The terms of the sale were not disclosed. Following the acquisition, Fox River Became a subsidiary of Standard Merchandising Co., a New Jersey–based sock maker also owned by LongWater. In August 2025 Mount Airy, North Carolina-based Nestor Hosiery announced their acquisition of the brands and assets of Standard Merchandising Co., including Fox River, Ballston, and Pistil. After the acquisition, the Osage plant was closed and production moved to Nestor's North Carolina plants.

== See also ==
- List of sock manufacturers
