= Jacob Ciocci =

American artist (born 1977)

- Born: 1977 (age 48–49); Lexington, Kentucky
- Education: Oberlin College, Carnegie Mellon University

Jacob Ciocci (born 1977) is an American visual artist, performance artist, musician, and professor. Along with sister Jessica Ciocci and friend Ben Jones, he was one of the three founding members of Paper Rad, an artist collective active from 2000 until 2008. He performs and tours regularly with drummer David Wightman in the band "Extreme Animals". As of 2025, he is based in Chicago, Illinois.

== About ==
Jacob Ciocci was born in 1977 in Lexington, Kentucky. He received his B.A. in computer science from Oberlin College. As a student at Oberlin College, Ciocci met Cory Arcangel and Paul B. Davis, and in 2000 Arcangel and Davis formed the experimental music collaboration Beige Programming Ensemble. Ciocci received his M.F.A. in art from Carnegie Mellon University in 2005.

Jacob and his sister Jessica became active in Paper Rad after moving to Boston and hanging out with Joe Grillo, Ben Jones, and Christopher Forgues (C.F.). All of them were interested in zine making, experimental art and music, and computers, which opened up the possibility of multimedia work.

In 2006, Ciocci received a 'Creative Heights' Grant from Heinz Endowments to be the artist in residence at the Pittsburgh Filmmakers film cooperative. Ciocci was a research resident fellow at Eyebeam in 2010–2011.

=== Teaching ===
Jacob Ciocci is currently an assistant professor in the School of Cinematic Arts at DePaul University in Chicago. Since 2017, he is the co-chair of DePaul's Animation MFA program. In 2015, he was a visiting professor at Oberlin College in the Integrated Media department.
