= King Star King =

American adult animated series

- Title Card
- Genre: Slapstick; Black comedy; Science fantasy; Adventure
- Created by: JJ Villard; Eric Kaplan (pilot co-creator)
- Developed by: Tommy Blacha
- Directed by: JJ Villard
- Creative director: Antonio Canobbio (series only)
- Voices of: (See Voices)
- Composers: Roger Neill; Mark Brooks (additional music, series only)
- Country of origin: United States
- Original language: English
- No. of episodes: 6 (+1 pilot and 1 special)

Production
- Executive producers: JJ Villard; Tommy Blacha; Eric Kaplan (pilot)
- Producers: Series: Ben Kalina and Shannon Prynoski; Peedee Shindell (Episodes 2–6); Pilot: Jukka Montonen and Raduca Kaplan
- Editors: George Soto (series); Jukka Montonen and J. J. Villard (pilot); Paul D. Calder (special)
- Running time: 11 minutes approx. 22 minutes (special)
- Production companies: Mirari Films (pilot); Titmouse, Inc. (series); Williams Street; Villard Film (Note: Credited as Kurtis only series. And special from Villard Film)

Original release
- Network: Adult Swim Video; Adult Swim (Pilot and special)
- Release: June 15 – August 3, 2014

King Star King is an American adult animated web series created by JJ Villard for Cartoon Network's nighttime programming block Adult Swim. The series aired on the network's online video streaming service Adult Swim Video on June 15, 2014 before it was aired on TV. Eric Kaplan also worked on the series' pilot episode.

Villard would later create JJ Villard's Fairy Tales for Cartoon Network Studios and Adult Swim. A TV special sequel using the same visual style titled King Star King!/!/!/ aired on February 13, 2023 on Adult Swim.

== Synopsis ==
The series revolves around the titular character, King Star King: a tall, blond muscular man. After seducing his love, Princess Snow White, he falls from his higher plane of existence to serve as a fry cook in the run-down diner, Waffle Zone. In order to reclaim his place in the heavens, he must battle his amnesia to defeat the evil Spring Bunny and rescue Snow White with the flying robot bear Gurbles, the duck wizard Pooza and the waffle-headed man Hank Waffles.

== Production ==
The pilot was announced preceding the network's 2012 upfront as part of their development slate. It was also disclosed during the upfront, and was reported again before the network's upfront the following year. It was announced as a web series for Adult Swim Video to premiere June 15, 2014; the series was advertised as "too shexxxy [sic]" for television. The network conducted an online poll whether episodes should be released daily or all at once; on June 11, the network announced it would release all six episodes of the first season simultaneously. A sweepstake for the series was announced on June 9, promoting six chances to win original artwork by Villard.

The series was animated using Adobe Flash by Titmouse, Inc. with ink and paint services made by Cyber Chicken Studios in South Korea and produced by J. J. Villard's vanity card, Kurtis; Mirari Films's Romanian facilities provided animation for the pilot episode, while the special was animated with hand-drawn animation by other South Korean studio, this time being Digital eMation with the Belgrade-based studio Truba Animation doing the series art direction.

In an interview at the 2013 Comic-Con, Villard dubbed the titular character as "He-Man on drugs". Series developer Tommy Blacha went on to describe comments with the network's Standards and Practices to "better tell [the show]." When asked about the inspiration for the series, Blacha joked that Villard pitched the series to network executive Mike Lazzo with a drawing of the protagonist, to which he approved production of the pilot. The two explained that as Villard started working on it with another producer and driving Lazzo "crazy," he abandoned the pilot; this led to Blacha joining as producer and toning it down by "two percent."

== Voices ==
- Tommy Blacha – King Star King, Hank Waffles (2014), Gurbles, Fat Frank, Mike Balls, KWA KWA
- Robin Atkin Downes – Narrator, Alfonso Molestro, Doctor, Chunkles, Hank's Mother, Tim Tumor, Carmine Excrementi, Pinchy Laroux, God Star God (2014)
- J. J. Villard – Pooza, Customer, Surfer
- Rachel Butera – Princess Snow White (2014), Slutty Waitress, Baroness Sludgeclot, Smear, Mrs. Balls, Burger Bitch
- Mallory McGill – Princess Snow White (2013)
- Eric Kaplan – Spring Bunny, Scrod
- Will Sasso – Eddie 5 Antlers
- Justin Roiland – Hank Waffles (2023 special), Cop
- Robert Englund – Jeff Bezos
- Andie MacDowell – Katrina
- John Waters – God Star God (2023 special)

== Episodes ==
Season	Episodes	Originally released	
Season	Episodes	First released	Last released
Pilot	1	November 3, 2013	
1	6	July 12, 2014	December 6, 2014
Special	1	February 13, 2023	

=== Pilot (2013) ===
Title	Written by	Original release date
"KSK!!!"	Tommy Blacha and Eric Kaplan	November 3, 2013
The pilot introduces King Star King, who (while attempting to declare his love for Snow White) gets kicked out from the realms of gods and forced to be a cook at a waffle joint in the post-apocalyptic city Krudzone with an anxious worker that got his soul transferred into the mascot, Hank Waffles.

=== Series (2014) ===
No.	Title	Written by	Original release date	Original release date	Prod. code
1	"The Sting of Alfonzo Molestro"	Tommy Blacha	June 15, 2014	July 12, 2014	101
When Princess Snow White gets decapitated by the evil Spanish-accented wizard Alfonso Molestro, King Star King and his crew must battle him for her body before it rots away.
2	"Chunkles and Smear"	Tommy Blacha	June 29, 2014	August 2, 2014	102
Hank Waffles, Gurbles and Pooza are forced to babysit Chunkles and Smear at the Waffle Zone; meanwhile, King Star King goes on a date with the gigantic country-accented children's mother, Baroness Sludgeclot.
3	"Fat Frank's Fantasy Lounge"	James Merrill	July 13, 2014	September 6, 2014	103
After a morbidly obsese alien named Fat Frank and his showgirls Crystal and Strawberry visit the Waffle Zone, King Star King and his crew visits his house where mental illusions are caused by a giant alien brain with a mesmerizing eye named Sheila.
4	"The Saga of Mike Balls"	Tommy Blacha	July 20, 2014	October 4, 2014	104
King Star King must harden a cowardly alien by the name of Mike Balls in order to defeat his enemy, a fancy British-accented rich boy who can turn into a giant carnivorous moth-like monstrous alien named Tim Tumor, but he ends up killing him.
5	"Springtime in the Gigantiverse"	Tommy Blacha	July 27, 2014	November 8, 2014	105
King Star King hatches into a new and improved version of himself; meanwhile, during spring break, Hank Waffles falls in love with an Italian-accented cheeseburger-headed woman named Burger Bitch.
6	"Kwa Kwa City"	Tommy Blacha	August 3, 2014	December 6, 2014; January 30, 2017 (digital retailers)	106
In order to save the world, King Star King and his crew must escape a city located inside the head of the mayor, who is an illusion-creating Native American petty thief named Eddie 5 Antlers that they get sucked into.

=== Special (2023) ===
Title	Written by	Original release date
"King Star King!/!/!/ (alternative title: "The King Star King Amazon Popeyes Christmas Special!!!")"	J. J. Villard, Justin Roiland, James Merrill, Johnny Ryan	February 13, 2023
Years after the events of the series, King Star King has become a fat, bald, middle-aged Amazon worker with a family (a loving housewife, a Pekingese dog and two children). He must team up with his old friends Hank Waffles, Pooza, and Gurbles on a dimension-spanning adventure to save his family.

== Release and reception ==
The pilot was screened at the 2013 San Diego Comic-Con, along with a panel hosted by Villard and Blacha. In July 2013, it was released online as part of a presentation of in-development shows for the network, partnered with KFC; viewers could vote for their favorite pilot, with the winner being broadcast on August 26, 2013. The series lost to Übermansion, a Stoopid Buddy Stoodios production, although the presentation won an Internet Advertising Campaign Award in 2014 for "Best TV Integrated Ad Campaign". Nevertheless, the pilot aired on the network's Toonami block on November 3, 2013 during the daylight saving time transition; Nielsen ratings were not captured during this period.

Meredith Woerner of io9 said that the series gained their approval at its description of a "punk rock He-Man". Conversely, upon surveying the show's description, Patrick Kevin Day of the Los Angeles Times's official blog dubbed the network a "home for stupid characters".

The episode "Fat Frank's Fantasy Lounge" won an Emmy for "Outstanding Individual Achievement In Animation" at the 67th Emmy Awards.
