= The Drinky Crow Show =

American adult animated television series

- Genre: Black comedy; Surreal humor
- Created by: Tony Millionaire; Eric Kaplan
- Based on: MAAKIES by Tony Millionaire
- Directed by: Igor Kovalyov (Note: Pilot); Matt Danner (Note: Series)
- Voices of: Dino Stamatopoulos; David Herman; Becky Thyre; Pamela Adlon
- Theme music composer: They Might Be Giants
- Opening theme: "The Drinky Crow Show" performed by They Might Be Giants
- Composers: Brass Castle; Sebastian Evans II; Additional music: Jeff Cardoni; Scott Francisco; Brass Castle
- Country of origin: United States
- Original language: English
- No. of seasons: 1
- No. of episodes: 10 (and 1 pilot)

Production
- Executive producers: Tony Millionaire; Eric Kaplan
- Producers: Raduca Kaplan; Jason Walden; Jukka Montonen; Matt Harrigan (Note: Consulting producer)
- Editors: Joe Gressis; Janos Boda; Oana Bojan
- Running time: 11–12 minutes
- Production companies: Mirari Films; Williams Street

Original release
- Network: Adult Swim
- Release: May 13, 2007 – January 25, 2009

The Drinky Crow Show is an American adult animated television series created by Eric Kaplan and Tony Millionaire based on the latter's comic strip Maakies. The pilot episode aired on Adult Swim on May 13, 2007. The series premiered on November 23, 2008, and ended its run on January 25, 2009. The cancellation of the show was confirmed by a Maakies comic.

Dino Stamatopoulos provides the voice of the title character and David Herman voices Uncle Gabby and Captain Maak. Millionaire's then-wife Becky Thyre voices the Captain's Daughter and Phoebe Bird. Pamela Adlon voices Mademoiselle DeBoursay and other female characters. Creators Tony Millionaire and Eric Kaplan provide additional voices. They Might Be Giants perform the show's theme song.

== Setting ==
The show centers on Drinky Crow (an often drunk crow) and Uncle Gabby, a drunken Irish monkey. It has a 19th-century nautical setting, where the main characters are constantly at war with the French, who are mostly alligators. It is characterized by graphic violence and surreal humor, and is rated TV-MA-V for graphic violence.

== Production ==
The animation is done by Mirari Films's facilities in Brașov using Maya, its resolution and its color palette are deliberately kept low. This gives the show a more traditional cel-animated look, reminiscent of 1950s children's TV cartoon shows.

== Characters ==
- Drinky Crow (Dino Stamatopoulos) – A desperate, depressed, tormented, romantic, suicidal, alcoholic crow.
- Uncle Gabby (David Herman) – A self-centered, stubborn, overweight Irish monkey who is only after girls and booze. He tends to only think of himself and sometimes tries to manipulate Drinky Crow.
- Phoebe Bird (Becky Thyre) – Drinky Crow's on-again, off-again, long-suffering sober seagull girlfriend. She used to date a walrus, but lost interest with him as he kept bringing his work home.
- Captain Maak (David Herman) – The brutal, lash-wielding captain of the boat Drinky Crow and Uncle Gabby work on. He is an American who does not care much for Uncle Gabby. He will only allow homosexuals near his daughter.
- Captain's Daughter (Becky Thyre) – A flirtatious, barefooted, sadistic, Betty Boop-style character who, like her title says, is the captain's daughter. Her real name is never given and the characters refer to her as "Captain's Daughter" (which is likely her real name). Her hobbies include never bathing and flossing her teeth while taking dumps.
- Lieutenant Vronchy (Dino Stamatopoulos) – An evil alligator who also is a naval captain for France.
- Mademoiselle DeBoursay (Pamela Adlon) - The French spy who works for Lieutenant Vronchy. She is able to sneak in and out mostly by seducing Uncle Gabby and Drinky Crow.
- Veteran Adult Swim voice actor George Lowe plays uncredited background characters.

== Episodes ==
=== Pilot (2007) ===
Title	Directed by	Written by	Original release date	Prod. code
"Pilot" "Mermaid"	Igor Kovalyov	Eric Kaplan	May 13, 2007	101
While out at sea, Drinky Crow spots a mermaid, but Uncle Gabby will not believe him (thinking that Drinky Crow was drunk).

=== Season 1 (2008–09) ===
No.	Title	Written by	Storyboarded by	Original release date	Prod. code
1	"Beer Goggles"	Eric Kaplan	Eddie Trigueros	November 23, 2008	102
After being dumped, Drinky Crow cuts out his eyes and replaces them with beer goggles so that he can date a hideous bar skank without being disgusted with himself. Guest appearances: Jemaine Clement and Bret McKenzie
2	"Tunnel Girls"	Eric Kaplan	Lisa Cardenas	December 28, 2008	103
Uncle Gabby dates a girl who is looking for a cheap thrill before her wedding night, while a harem of girls who can turn into a race car try to seduce Drinky Crow. Guest appearance: Maurice LaMarche
3	"Organs"	Eric Kaplan	Matt Danner & Ricky Garduno	December 14, 2008	104
Drinky Crow infuriates his brain by quitting drinking, Uncle Gabby dates a sexy French spy trapped in a cage, and a young syphilis with a lot to prove fights his bladder.
4	"Whale Show"	Eric Kaplan & Mike Yank	Eddie Trigueros	November 30, 2008	105
When Drinky Crow's girlfriend dies horribly, he decides to convert his grief into money at a marine theme park that specializes in sex, violence, and meta-humor.
5	"Old Girlfriend"	Eric Kaplan & Mike Yank	Luke Cormican	December 21, 2008	106
Drinky Crow's old girlfriend comes back into his life, but is only interested in sex and slavery. Guest appearances: Jemaine Clement and Bret McKenzie
6	"God Of Monkeys"	Daniel Chun	Sean Szeles	December 7, 2008	107
Uncle Gabby gives Drinky Crow a hernia, and feels guilt for the first time in his life, so he orders an immense Monkey God from the internet.
7	"Elephant Man"	Samuel Johnson	Sean Szeles	January 4, 2009	108
Drinky Crow befriends a hideous freak with Proteus syndrome on a suicide hotline, and Uncle Gabby resolves to steal him away for himself. Guest appearance: Jonathan Slavin
8	"Bar"	Sam Means	Marc Ceccarelli	January 11, 2009	109
The sleazy Maakies bar becomes gentrified and Drinky Crow is inspired to commit many horrible and gruesome murders.
9	"Aspire"	Eric Kaplan	Marc Ceccarelli	January 18, 2009	110
Drinky Crow must solve two mysteries — where the ship's rats are coming from and where the French spy DeBoursay is hiding her atomic reactor. The two solutions are as surprising as they are disgusting. Guest appearance: Jackie Mason.
10	"Peace"	Mike Yank	Marc Ceccarelli	January 25, 2009	111
When Peace breaks out, Drinky Crow discovers his girlfriend is expecting eggs, and joins a torture and revenge racket to make ends meet.

== International broadcast ==
In Canada, The Drinky Crow Show previously aired on G4's Adult Digital Distraction block, and on the Canadian version of Adult Swim.

== Home media ==
All episodes, excluding the pilot, are available on iTunes. The entire series, including the pilot, has been made available for streaming on the official Adult Swim website.
