= Tony Millionaire =

American cartoonist

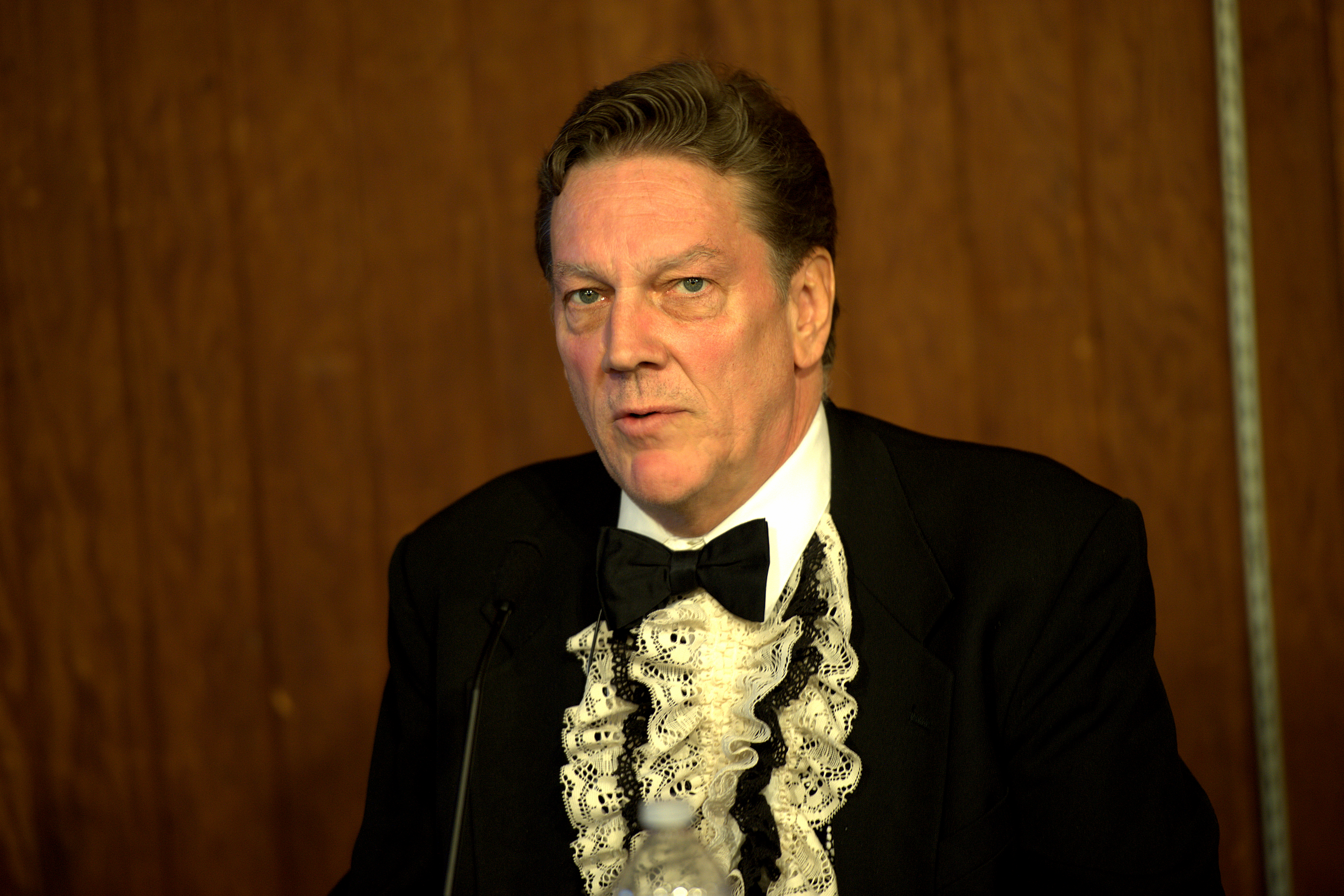
- Tony Millionaire at the 2010 Alternative Press Expo.
- Born: 1956 (age 69–70) Gloucester, Massachusetts, United States
- Area: Cartoonist
- Notable works: Maakies, Sock Monkey

Tony Millionaire (born 1956) is an American cartoonist, illustrator and author known for his syndicated comic strip Maakies and the Sock Monkey series of comics and picture books.

== Personal life ==
Born in 1956, Tony Millionaire grew up in and around the seaside town of Gloucester, Massachusetts. He was married to actress Becky Thyre, and has two daughters, Phoebe and Pearl.

He came from a family of artists – his father was a commercial illustrator, his mother and grandparents were painters – and was encouraged to draw from an early age. His grandfather, who was a friend of the cartoonists Roy Crane and Les Turner, had a large collection of old Sunday comics, which were an early source of inspiration to Millionaire. He drew his first comic strip, "Zeroman, about an egg-shaped superhero who flew around talking about how great he was and then crashing into a cliff," when he was nine years old. During high school, Millionaire continued to draw comic strips for his own amusement.

In 2022, he stated in an interview he was in recovery from alcoholism and lived in Yarmouth, Maine with artist and educator, Kat Gillies.

== Career ==
After high school, Millionaire attended the Massachusetts College of Art, where he majored in painting. While in college, he began drawing houses for money; this, along with occasional illustration jobs, would be his primary source of income for the next 20 years. After graduating from college, he moved from place to place, living in Boston; Florida; California; and Italy; before settling in Berlin for five years during the 1980s. Returning to the U.S. in the early '90s, he moved to Brooklyn, where he drew a regular comic strip, Medea's Weekend, for the Williamsburg newsweekly Waterfront Week for about a year.

One night at a local bar, the Six Twelve, Millionaire drew "a cartoon about a little bird who drank booze and blew his brains out" on a napkin – the origin of his best-known character, Drinky Crow. The bartender encouraged him to draw more cartoons, offering him a free beer for each one he completed. After doing many of these cocktail napkin drawings, Millionaire began drawing more polished versions of his cartoons for publication in various zines, including Spike Vrusho's Murtaugh and Selwyn Harris's HappyLand. He also did drawings for several trade journals and Al Goldstein's notorious tabloid Screw.

Following his work for Waterfront Week, Millionaire began drawing the strip "Maakies" for the alternative newsweekly New York Press, which asked him to draw a weekly strip in 1994. It soon spread to other papers across the country. During the mid-2000s, Millionaire transferred Maakies to The Village Voice as its NYC venue, but returned it to the New York Press in February 2007.

Besides Maakies, Millionaire produced a series of comics and picture books, collectively titled Sock Monkey. He formerly contributed to comics anthologies including Legal Action Comics, Star Wars Tales, Marvel's Strange Tales, Dirty Stories, and DC's Bizarro Comics. His illustrations were published in publications including The New York Times, The New Yorker and The Wall Street Journal. For a time he contributed art to Dave Eggers' magazine The Believer. Animated versions of his work were featured on Saturday Night Live, in the They Might Be Giants documentary Gigantic, and on Adult Swim. In 2006, Fantagraphics Books published his graphic novel Billy Hazelnuts. He did the cover art for Elvis Costello's 2009 album Secret, Profane & Sugarcane. Starting February 10, 2010, Millionaire's comic Maakies was published weekly in Nib-Lit for a period of time. Nib-Lit went offline by 2020 leaving Millionaire without an outlet for his work.

He won the Eisner Award for Talent Deserving of Wider Recognition in 2000 and the Eisner Award for Best Writer/Artist—Humor in 2001, 2003, and 2007.

== Style and influences ==
Millionaire draws in a lush style that mingles naturalistic detail with strong doses of the fanciful and grotesque. His linework resembles that of Johnny Gruelle, whom he cites as one of his main sources of inspiration, along with Ernest Shepard and "all those freaks from the teens, twenties and thirties who did the newspaper strips"; many of Millionaire's admirers adduce a similarity to the work of E. C. Segar in particular. He draws with a fountain pen.

The nautical settings of much of Millionaire's work draw inspiration from his childhood memories of his grandparents' artwork and seaside home, as well as the novels of Patrick O'Brian, of which he is an avid reader.

== Pseudonym ==
Tony Millionaire's birth name is Scott Richardson, which he admitted in a YouTube video he posted in 2021.

Yet, he maintains that "Tony Millionaire" is his real name: "It is my legal name, and it's been around a lot longer than I've been a cartoonist." He has said his unusual surname is an Old French word meaning "a person who owns a thousand serfs," but the origin of the name "Tony Millionaire" is a character in an episode of the 1960s TV series I Dream of Jeannie.

Millionaire has speculated that in the future he may publish some family-friendly works of his under a different moniker, in order to dissociate them from his other, more ribald output.

== Filmography ==
- Adult Swim Presents The Drinky Crow Show (2007–2009) (Creator, Actor, Executive Producer)
- Fun with God (2009) (Actor in the titular role)
- Goil Trouble (2010) (Actor)

== See also ==
- God Hates Cartoons
