= Jessica Ciocci =

Artist

Jessica Ciocci (born 1976) is an American artist working in a range of mediums including animation and video, Twitter, crafting, digital online projects, comics, mixtapes, performance, painting, drawing and sculpture.

Ciocci was a founding member of art collective Paper Rad.

She has exhibited at the New Museum, the Migros Museum, Yerba Buena Center for the Arts, Deitch Projects, and Foxy Production. She has spoken and/or performed at Bard College, Columbia College, SVA, and Smith College. Her work has been reviewed by Holland Cotter, Ken Johnson and Roberta Smith in the New York Times and Ed Halter in Rhizome. She holds a BA in psychology and art from Wellesley College.
