= Maakies =

Comic strip by Tony Millionaire

- Author: Tony Millionaire
- Current status/schedule: Ended
- Launch date: 1994
- End date: 2016
- Syndicate(s): Self-syndicated
- Genre: Humor

Maakies is a comic strip by Tony Millionaire. It began publication in February 1994 in the New York Press. It has previously run in many American alternative newsweeklies including The Stranger, LA Weekly and Only. It has also appeared in several international venues including the Italian comics magazine Linus and the Swedish comics magazine Rocky.

On December 14, 2016, Tony Millionaire announced that Maakies had ended. One of the reasons he stated for discontinuing the strip was that many of the weekly papers that carried the strip were no longer in business.

On May 19, 2021, Tony Millionaire announced that weekly strips were being published again.

== Characteristics ==
Maakies focuses on the darkly comic misadventures of Uncle Gabby (a "drunken Irish monkey") and Drinky Crow (a crow), two antiheroes with a propensity for drunkenness, violence, suicide, and venereal disease. According to Millionaire, "Maakies is me spilling my guts... Writing and drawing about all the things that make me want to jump in the river, laughing at the horror of being alive."

Maakies strips typically take place in an early 19th-century nautical setting. There is rarely any continuity between strips. The comic often includes visual references to historic works of art, especially to the popular graphic arts such as Japanese ukiyo-e, European engravings, and early American newspaper comics.

Like many early 20th century Sunday strips, each Maakies comic usually includes a second, smaller strip (known as a "topper") that runs along the bottom of the main strip. Tiny landscape drawings are interspersed between the panels of these strips. Also, a tugboat (referred to once as "the enigmatic Maakies tug") appears somewhere in the background of virtually every strip.

== Meaning of the title ==
Millionaire has given differing accounts of the origin and meaning of the word "maakies." "Maak" is the name of a character in the strip, a ship's captain who apparently is Uncle Gabby's employer, and in one sense the strip seems to be named after him. Discussing the strip's development, Millionaire said "I fleshed them [the characters] out as best I could at the time, knowing that they'd grow over time. That's why I didn't call the strip Drinky Crow. I called it Maakies because I didn't know who would become the most important characters as I went along."

However, on more than one occasion he has claimed that the true significance of the strip's name is a strict secret: "I can't release that information until a certain person dies... Because he or she would be extremely pissed off to even know that that name was being used."

Elsewhere he has attributed the origin of the word to his friend Spike Vrusho: "Some of the tugboats in New York harbor have a big M painted on the side of them and my friend Spike Vrusho used to say "MAAKIES!" in a high-pitched screech every time he saw one."

== Book collections ==
- Maakies (2000)
- The House at Maakies Corner (2002)
- When We Were Very Maakies (2004)
- Der Struwwelmaakies (2005)
- Premillennial Maakies (2006) – a hardcover reprint of the contents of the first Maakies book.
- The Maakies with the Wrinkled Knees (2008)
- Drinky Crow's Maakies Treasury (2009) – contains the contents of The House at Maakies Corner, When We Were Very Maakies, and Der Struwwelmaakies.
- Little Maakies on the Prairie (2010)
- Green Eggs and Maakies (2013)
- Maakies: Drinky Crow Drinks Again (2016)

All the Maakies collections are published by Fantagraphics Books and designed by Chip Kidd. All but the first of the books are hardcover, printed in an unusual 12 in × 5 in (300 mm × 130 mm) format that preserves the dimensions of Millionaire's original drawings.

With the exception of the first collection and its hardcover reprint, the title of each of the Maakies books refers to a classic children's book – A. A. Milne's The House at Pooh Corner and When We Were Very Young, Heinrich Hoffman's Der Struwwelpeter, Johnny Gruelle's Raggedy Ann and Andy and the Camel with the Wrinkled Knees, and Laura Ingalls Wilder's Little House on the Prairie.

== Animation ==
A scene from one of the Maakies Flash animations.

Several short Maakies Flash animations were shown on Saturday Night Live in the late 1990s. Several more animations were produced but never broadcast. All of the Maakies Flash animations are included on the DVD collection God Hates Cartoons, published by Bright Red Rocket.

A Maakies short bridges the two-halves of the 2002 They Might Be Giants documentary Gigantic.

An animated television pilot for The Drinky Crow Show, based on the Maakies characters, premiered on Cartoon Network's Adult Swim on May 13, 2007. Dino Stamatopoulos provided the voice of the titular character, and They Might Be Giants performed the show's theme song. The show premiered on Adult Swim on November 23, 2008 and ran for one season containing ten episodes. It ended on January 25, 2009. The cancellation of the show was confirmed by a Maakies comic.
