= Motor City Comic Con =

Multi-genre convention in Novi, Michigan, U.S.

Coordinates: 42.488937°N 83.505061°W

- Status: Active
- Genre: Speculative fiction
- Venue: Dearborn Civic Center (1989–1998); Novi Expo Center (1994–2004); Rock Financial Showplace/Suburban Collection Showplace/Vibe Credit Union Showplace (2005–present)
- Location: Novi, Michigan
- Country: United States
- Inaugurated: 1989
- Attendance: 70,000 (2019)
- Organizer: Motor City Conventions
- Filing status: for-profit
- Website: www.motorcitycomiccon.com

The Motor City Comic Con is a fan convention held in Novi, Michigan, United States, at the Vibe Credit Union Showplace. It is traditionally a three-day event (Friday through Sunday), usually held in May of each year, although an additional second event is frequently held in October as well. The Motor City Comic Con was founded in 1989 by comics retailer Michael Goldman.

Though it primarily focuses on comic books, the convention features a large range of pop culture elements, such as film actors, professional wrestling, science fiction/fantasy, film/television, animation, anime, manga, toys, horror, collectible card games, video games, webcomics, and fantasy novels. Along with panels, seminars, and workshops with comic book professionals, there are previews of upcoming feature films, portfolio review sessions with top comic book and video game companies, and such evening events as a costume contest. Traditional events include gaming and hours of other programming on all aspects of comic books and pop culture.

The Motor City Comic Con features a large floorspace for exhibitors. These include media companies such as movie studios and TV networks, as well as comic-book dealers and collectibles merchants. Like most comics conventions, the show includes an autograph area, as well as the Artists' Alley where comics artists can sign autographs and sell or do free sketches. Despite the name, Artists' Alley can include writers and even glamour models.

== History ==
Southfield, Michigan, comic book retailer Michael Goldman, owner of Motor City Comics, staged the first Motor City Comic Con at the Dearborn Civic Center in 1989. Antecedents to the Motor City Comic Con include the seminal multi-genre convention the Detroit Triple Fan Fair which was held annually in the Detroit area from 1965 to 1978; and Gary Reed's King Kon, held in the area from 1984 to 1986.

Show promoter Goldman brought on Gary Bishop in 1989 to manage the convention; Bishop worked for Motor City Conventions until 2007. From 1992–1998, the Motor City Comic Con was the site of the Compuserve Comics and Animation Forum's Don Thompson Awards (also known as the Thompsons). From 1993–2004, the convention was held twice a year, once in the spring and once in the fall. Typically the larger three-day spring convention was held in Novi and the smaller two-day fall show was held at the Dearborn Civic Center.

The fall 1998 show hosted the convention's fourth annual Red Cross blood drive and the seventh annual charity art auction to benefit of the Muscular Dystrophy Association. By this point, the Motor City Comic Con had raised nearly $35,000 to benefit the Muscular Dystrophy Association. In 1999, Goldman claimed the Motor City Comic Con was the third-largest comic convention in the United States.

By 2003, the most popular elements of the Motor City Comic Con were the appearances of celebrities from the world of film, television, and other media; rather than the comic book creators who were the namesake of the show. (This mirrored the situation at other so-called comic book conventions nationwide.)

In fall 2005, after many years of being held at the Novi Expo Center, the facility closed and the convention moved to the newly built Rock Financial Showplace (later renamed the Suburban Collection Showplace).

In 2010, Motor City Comic Con scheduled a fall component to its show for the weekend of October 30–31. That same weekend was the debut of the new show Detroit Fanfare; Motor City Comic Con changed its fall show to November 20–21, and later canceled the fall 2010 show altogether.

The 2020 edition of the show was cancelled due to the COVID-19 pandemic.

The 2021 edition was held in October of that year, but COVID precautions were put in place so guests, VIPs, and artists would be safer until the pandemic began to slow down. The 2022 edition was held back in its original month of May.

=== Dates and locations ===
Dates	Venue	Location	Official guests	Notes
1989	Dearborn Civic Center	Dearborn, Michigan		2,500 attendees
February 17–18, 1990	Dearborn Civic Center	Dearborn, Michigan	Erik Larsen, Gary Kwapisz, Jeff Albrecht, John Ostrander, Kim Yale, Marshall Rogers, Matt Feazell, Mike Grell, Norm Breyfogle, Rob Liefeld, and Tim Dzon	Admission $4 each day; $7 for the weekend
1991	Dearborn Civic Center	Dearborn, Michigan		
1992	Dearborn Civic Center	Dearborn, Michigan		
October 2–3, 1993	Dearborn Civic Center	Dearborn, Michigan		Program booklet cover by Tom Morgan
March 25–27, 1994	Novi Expo Center	Novi, Michigan		Program booklet cover by Rich Buckler and Sheldon Moldoff
October 1–2, 1994	Dearborn Civic Center	Dearborn, Michigan		Program booklet cover by Dick Sprang and Whilce Portacio
March 24–25, 1995	Novi Expo Center	Novi, Michigan		Program booklet cover by Brian Murray
October 7–8, 1995	Dearborn Civic Center	Dearborn, Michigan		Program booklet cover by Franchesco
March 22–24, 1996	Novi Expo Center	Novi, Michigan		Program booklet cover by David W. Mack and Sheldon Moldoff
October 12–13, 1996	Dearborn Civic Center	Dearborn, Michigan		Program booklet cover by Jim Mooney
March 21–23, 1997March 21–23, 1997	Novi Expo Center	Novi, Michigan		Program booklet cover by Rob Prior
October 11–12, 1997	Dearborn Civic Center	Dearborn, Michigan		Program booklet cover by Kirk Jarvinen and Randy Zimmerman
May 15–17, 1998	Novi Expo Center	Novi, Michigan	Comics guests: Murphy Anderson, Michael Bair, Edward Beard Jr., Brian Bendis, Timothy Bradstreet, Dan Brereton, Mark Crilley, Guy Davis, David Dorman, Will Eisner, John Estes, Glenn Fabry, Matt Feazell, Hart Fisher, Franchesco, Ken Gale, Jay Geldhof, Joseph Giella, Lorraine Haines, Tony Harris, R. C. Harvey, Drew Hayes, Paul Herbert, Greg Hildebrandt, Tim Hildebrandt, Kyle Hotz, Bob Ingersoll, Tony Isabella, Kelley Jones, Joe Jusko, Gil Kane, Steve Lieber, Vince Locke, William Messner-Loebs, David Mack, Thomas Manning, Angel Medina, Dan Mishkin, Sheldon Moldoff, Jason Moore, Philip Moy, Jeffrey Moy, James O'Barr, Mike Okamoto, Jim Pavelec, Rob Prior, Gordon Purcell, David Quinn, James Robinson, Scott Rosema, Ron Rouselle II, P. Craig Russell, Julius Schwartz, Jim Silke, Al Simmons (Spawn), Chris Sprouse, William Stout, Jill Thompson, Susan Van Camp, Mercy Van Vlack, Tim Vigil, Vlad, Matt Wagner, Mike Wieringo, Bernie Wrightson, and Randy Zimmerman	Program booklet cover by Will Eisner; admission $12/day or $28 for 3-day pass
October 10–11, 1998	Dearborn Civic Center	Dearborn, Michigan	Kyle Hotz, Guy Davis, Vince Locke, Rob Prior, David W. Mack, Mike Okamoto, Franchesco, Scott Rosema, Randy Zimmerman, Jason Moore, Susan Van Camp, William Messner-Loebs, Mark Crilley, Joe Jusko, David Quinn, Dan Brereton, Lurene Haines, James Robinson, James O'Barr, Matt Feazell, Ken Gale, Mercy Van Vlack, Dan Mishkin, Timothy Truman, Adam Hughes, Joe Chiodo, and John Hollis	$8/day; program booklet cover by Joe Chiodo
May 14–16, 1999	Novi Expo Center	Novi, Michigan		Program booklet cover by Joe Kubert and Sheldon Moldoff
October 23–24, 1999	Novi Expo Center	Novi, Michigan	David W. Mack, Tim Vigil, David Quinn, Vincent Locke, Jill Thompson, John Ostrander, Guy Davis, Mark Waid, Devin Grayson, and William Messner-Loebs	Program booklet cover by David Finch and Joe B. Weems
May 19–21, 2000	Novi Expo Center	Novi, Michigan	James Doohan	Program booklet cover by D-Tron, Andy Park, and J. D. Smith
October 21–22, 2000	Novi Expo Center	Novi, Michigan	Dick Ayers, Terri Boyle, Frank Brunner, Sal Buscema, Guy Davis, Dan DeCarlo, Franchesco, Cully Hamner, Adam Hughes, Georges Jeanty, Joseph Michael Linsner, Vince Locke, William Messner-Loebs, Jason Moore, James O'Barr, Mike Okamoto, David Quinn, Greg Rucka, Marie Severin, Brian Steelfreeze, Karl Story, Randy Zimmerman, and Bob May	Program booklet cover by Joseph Michael Linsner
May 18–20, 2001	Novi Expo Center	Novi, Michigan	Sergio Aragonés, Todd Dezago, David Finch, Franchesco, Andy Lee, Steve Lieber, Paul Jenkins, Jason Moore, James O'Barr, Michael Avon Oeming, Brian Pulido, Stan Sakai, Chris Sprouse, J. Michael Straczynski, Michael Turner, Randy Zimmerman, Murphy Anderson, Pam Bliss, Mark Crilley, Marshall Dillon, Dick Giordano, David W. Mack, Eddy Newell, Martin Nodell, Mike Okamoto, Diana Okamoto, Jim Ottaviani, Greg Rucka, Billy Tucci, and Chris Yambar	$15/day; program booklet cover by David W. Mack
November 17–18, 2001	Novi Expo Center	Novi, Michigan	Aaron Bordner, Peter David, Guy Davis, Marshall Dillon, Vince Locke, Jason Moore, Mark Schultz, William Stout, Randy Zimmerman, Chase Masterson, Vaughn Armstrong, Julie Caitlin Brown, Jeremy Bulloch, Angus McGinnis, Garek Hagon, and Kenneth Colley	
May 17–19, 2002	Novi Expo Center	Novi, Michigan	Cindy Williams, Frank Cho, Guy Davis, Christopher Golden, Carmine Infantino, Joseph Michael Linsner, Vince Locke, Andy Lee, David W. Mack, Tom Mandrake, Dan Mishkin, Bill Morrison, Mike Okamoto, Scott Rosema, Thomas E. Sniegoski, Brian Stelfreeze, Roy Thomas, S. Clay Wilson, and Randy Zimmerman	14,000 attendees; admission: $16 per day; program booklet cover by Matt Groening
October 26–27, 2002	Novi Expo Center	Novi, Michigan	Richard Herd, James Horan, Michael Edmunds, David Prowse, Shannon Baska, Glori Anne Gilbert, Patrick Bauchau, Jon Gries, and Richard Marcus	Program booklet cover by James O'Barr
May 16–18, 2003	Novi Expo Center	Novi, Michigan	Aaron Bordner, Mark Bode, Dan Brereton, Norm Breyfogle, Guy Davis, Dan Fogel, Frank Kelly Freas, Laura Freas, Gilbert Hernandez, Jaime Hernandez, Vince Locke, William Messner Loebs, James O'Barr, Jim Pitts, Paul Ryan, William Stout, Billy Tucci, Neil Vokes, and Larry Welz	15,000 attendees; program booklet cover by William Stout
October 18–19, 2003	Novi Expo Center	Novi, Michigan	Kurt Busiek, Andy Lee, and David W. Mack	Program booklet cover by Paul Ryan
May 14–16, 2004	Novi Expo Center	Novi, Michigan	Julie Benz, Erin Gray, Kate Jackson, Ron Perlman, and Alfonso Ribeiro	15th anniversary show; program booklet by Dick Ayers and Greg Horn
October 16–17, 2004	Novi Expo Center	Novi, Michigan	Dan Mishkin, Rowena Morrill, Bill Morrison, Stephanie Murnane, Eddy Newell, Diana Okamoto, Mike Okamoto, Mike Pascale, Scott Rosema, Steve Rude, Stan Sakai, Paul Sizer, Layne Toth, Daniel Webb, Bill Wilkinson, and Randy Zimmerman	Program booklet cover by Steve Rude
May 13–15, 2005	Novi Expo Center	Novi, Michigan	Terry Austin, Steve Englehart, Marshall Rogers, Mark Texeira, Billy Tucci, Guy Davis, Vince Locke, Scott Rosema, Randy Zimmerman, James O'Barr, Pam Bliss, Matt Feazell, Art Baltazar, Andy Bennett, Dave Aikins, Aaron Bordner, Bill Bryan, Kevin Leen, William Messner-Loebs, Carl Lundgren, Mick McArt, Eddy Newell, Diana Okamoto, Mike Okamoto, and Paul Sizer	Program booklet cover by Mark Sparacio, Mark Texeira, and Billy Tucci
October 15–16, 2005	Rock Financial Showplace	Novi, Michigan	Dick Ayers, Mark Bode, Guy Davis, Dave Dorman, Al Feldstein, Ron Garney, Mike Grell, Paul Gulacy, Casey Jones, Trent Kaniuga, Ray Lago, Andy Lee, Vince Locke, William Messner-Loebs, David W. Mack, Brian Pulido, Don Rosa, Scott Rosema, Paul Ryan, Timothy Truman, and Randy Zimmerman	
May 20–21, 2006	Rock Financial Showplace	Novi, Michigan	Adam West, Burt Ward, David Faustino, and Jerri Manthey	Program booklet cover by Jim Steranko and Mark Sparacio
October 14–15, 2006	Rock Financial Showplace	Novi, Michigan	Guy Davis, William Messner-Loebs, James O'Barr, Ken Osmond, Robert Culp, Bill Daily, Lori Petty, and Michael Dorn	
May 18–20, 2007	Rock Financial Showplace	Novi, Michigan	BarBara Luna, Louis Gossett Jr., and Lou Ferrigno	Program booklet cover by Joe Corroney and Mark Sparacio
May 16–18, 2008	Rock Financial Showplace	Novi, Michigan	Robert Armstrong, Dick Ayers, Art Baltazar, Jeremy Bastian, Gary Scott Beatty, Pam Bliss, Matt Busch, Tommy Castillo, Chris Claremont, Guy Davis, Matt Feazell, Al Feldstein, David Finch, Gary Friedrich, Tony Gray, Ken Kelly, Robert Kraus, Vince Locke, William Messner-Loebs, David Petersen, Arthur Suydam, Billy Tan, Billy Tucci, Daniel Way, Bernie Wrightson, Chris Yambar, and Randy Zimmerman	Program booklet cover by Matt Busch and Marc Wolfe
May 15–17, 2009	Rock Financial Showplace	Novi, Michigan	Art Baltazar, Dwayne McDuffie, Guy Davis, Carrie Fisher, John Schneider, Aaron Douglas, Michael Hogan, Kristy Swanson, Julie Newmar, Doug Jones, Catherine Bach, Garrett Wang, and Joyce DeWitt	
May 14–16, 2010	Rock Financial Showplace	Novi, Michigan	Linda Blair, Lindsay Wagner, and Adam West	
May 13–15, 2011	Suburban Collection Showplace	Novi, Michigan	David Petersen, Tim Sale, George Takei, Brent Spiner, Kate Mulgrew, Tricia Helfer, Sam Huntington, and Ernie Hudson	Program booklet cover by Keu Cha and Mark Sparacio
May 18–20, 2012	Suburban Collection Showplace	Novi, Michigan	Billy Tucci, Mike Grell, Ethan Van Sciver, Peter Bagge, Joseph Lee, Nichelle Nichols, Colin Ferguson, Dean Cain, Loni Anderson, Howard Hesseman, Billy Dee Williams, Christopher Knight, Butch Patrick, and Erin Gray	18,000 attendees
May 17–19, 2013	Suburban Collection Showplace	Novi, Michigan	Comic Guests: Stan Lee, George Pérez, David Lloyd, Greg Horn, Katie Cook, Mark McKenna, Tony Moore, Kalman Andrasofszky, Simon Bisley, Carlos Pacheco, Ryan Stegman, Mike McKone, Tom Raney, Yanick Paquette, and Chris Sprouse; Media Guests: Alex Winter, Norman Reedus, Cary Elwes, Marina Sirtis, Edward James Olmos, Meaghan Rath, Colin Baker, Micky Dolenz, Curtis Armstrong, and Robert Carradine	30,000 attendees
May 16–18, 2014	Suburban Collection Showplace	Novi, Michigan	William Shatner, Jason David Frank, Billy Zabka, Martin Kove, Burt Young, Milo Ventimiglia, Bret "The Hitman" Hart, The Nasty Boys, "Hacksaw" Jim Duggan, Brutus "The Barber" Beefcake, Robert Hays, Kristanna Loken, Brittany Daniel, and Paris Themmen	40,000 attendees
May 15–17, 2015	Suburban Collection Showplace	Novi, Michigan	William Shatner, Linda Blair, Billy Boyd, Dean Cain, Robert Englund, Lou Ferrigno, Tom Kenny, Ralph Macchio, John Schneider, Jimmie Walker, and Dawn Wells; The Walking Dead: Chad Coleman, "Tyrese", Michael Cudlitz, "Abraham", Lawrence Gilliard Jr., "Bob", Emily Kinney, "Beth", Chandler Riggs, "Carl", and Scott Wilson, "Hershel"	50,000 attendees
May 13–15, 2016	Suburban Collection Showplace	Novi, Michigan	Lea Thompson, Lena Headey, Adam West, Jon Bernthal, Michael Cudlitz, Michael Nesmith, Brenda Strong, Ric Flair, Tara Reid, and Robin Lord Taylor	55,000 attendees
May 19–21, 2017	Suburban Collection Showplace	Novi, Michigan	Ryan Stegman, Mena Suvari, Ron Perlman, Sean Astin, Neal Adams, Zach McGowan, LeVar Burton, Scott Wilson, Billie Piper, and Michael Rooker	55,000 attendees
May 18–20, 2018	Suburban Collection Showplace	Novi, Michigan	Black Lightning: Nafessa Williams, Cress Williams, and China Anne McClain; Black Panther Lexus LC 500, Lucy Lawless, Frank Quitely, and Jerome Flynn; It Kids: Chosen Jacobs, "Mike", Jackson Scott, "Georgie", Jack Grazer, "Eddie", Jaeden Lieberher, "Bill", and Wyatt Oleff, "Stanley"; John Cassaday, Stephen Amell, Summer Glau, and Val Kilmer; and Smallville: Tom Welling, "Clark Kent / Superman" and Michael Rosenbaum, "Lex Luthor"	60,000 attendees
May 17–19, 2019	Suburban Collection Showplace	Novi, Michigan	Alanna Masterson, Barry Williams, Benjamin Byron Davis, Brandon Routh, Brian Baumgartner, Charlie Hunnam, David Tennant, D.B. Woodside, Doug Jones, Elizabeth Berkley, Ethan Peck, Felicia Day, Freema Agyeman, George Takei, Henry Ian Cusick, Henry Thomas, Henry Winkler, Irene Bedard, Jack O'Halloran, John Cleese, Jonathan Frakes, Joonas Suotamo, Judith Hoag, Justin Briner, Kristian Nairn, Lesley-Ann Brandt, Leslie David Baker, Linda Larkin, Lori Petty, Lou Ferrigno, Mark-Paul Gosselaar, Monica Rial, Neve Campbell, Nick Castle, Pauly Shore, Pom Klementieff, Roger Clark, Ryan Hurst, Sarah Douglas, Shawn Michaels, Theo Rossi, Tom Ellis, and Tom Payne	70,000 attendees; 30th anniversary
May 15–17, 2020	Cancelled due to COVID-19 pandemic			
October 15–17, 2021	Suburban Collection Showplace	Novi, Michigan	Jodi Benson, Ming-Na Wen, Braun Strowman, David Yost, Nolan North	attendance number currently N.A.; Return following 2020 cancellation due to COVID-19 pandemic
May 13–15, 2022	Suburban Collection Showplace	Novi, Michigan	William Shatner, Alicia Silverstone	
October 14–16, 2022	Suburban Collection Showplace	Novi, Michigan		
May 19–21, 2023	Suburban Collection Showplace	Novi, Michigan	Steve Cardenas, Tara Strong, Jonathan Frakes, Brent Spiner, Michael Rooker, Christopher Lloyd, Sean Gunn, Edward Furlong	
November 10–12, 2023	Suburban Collection Showplace	Novi, Michigan	Billy Dee Williams, Renae Jacobs, Veronica Taylor, Marty Grabstein, Richard Steven Horvitz	
May 17–19, 2024	Suburban Collection Showplace	Novi, Michigan	William Shatner, Gates McFadden, Amy Jo Johnson, Dante Basco, George Wendt, John Ratzenberger, Helen Hunt, Katee Sackhoff, Karen Allen, Greg Baldwin, Steve Downes, Jen Taylor, Cristina Vee, Grey DeLisle, Heather Graham, Thomas F. Wilson, Ron Simmons, Paul Sun-Hyung Lee, Tom Kenny, Jennifer Morrison, Lex Luger, Ethan Page; Cancelled: Ron Perlman, Sofia Boutella, Hayden Panettiere	
November 8–10, 2024	Suburban Collection Showplace	Novi, Michigan	Robert Englund, Matthew Lewis, Andy Serkis, Karan Ashley, Ronee Blakely, Barry Bostwick, Tomer Capone, Cam Clarke, John Cleese, Townsend Coleman, Brian Drummond, Hacksaw Jim Duggan, Tait Fletcher, Karen Fukuhara, Barry Gordon, Manny Jancinto, Allesandro Juliani, Wayne Knight, Logic, Joel McHale, Christopher Mintz-Plasse, Rob Paulsen, Ron Perlman, Priscilla Pressly, John Rhys-Davies, Alan Ruck, Brad Swaile, George Takei, Amanda Wyss, Dave Coulier, John Cusack; Cancelled: Vincent D'Onofrio, Ray Park, Kiefer Sutherland, Shannon Chan-Kent	
May 16–18, 2025	Suburban Collection Showplace	Novi, Michigan	Bill Nye, Laura Prepron, Jeremy Renner, Martin Sheen, Malin Akerman, Shawn Ashmore, Sean Astin, Katelyn Barr, Chris Bartlett, Jacob Betrand, Ahmed Best, The Hardy Boyz, Steve Burns, Steve Cardanas, Colleen Clinkenbeard, Josh Dela Cruz, Chris Potter, George Buza, Cal Dodd, Alison Sealy-Smith, Matthew Watterson, Catherine Disher, Lenore Zann, Alyson Court, Seth Gabel, Todd Haberkorn, Garrett Hedlund, Bryce Dallas Howard, Famke Janssen, Denis Lawson, Thomas Lennon, Xolo Mariduena, Sam Marin, Anson Mount, Donovan Patton, Robert Picardo, Christina Ricci, William Salyers, Devon Sawa, Nazeeh Tarsha, Bardley Whitford, Sam Witwer, Cedric Yarbrough, Carrie-Anne Moss; Cancelled: Vincent D'Onofrio, Rainn Wilson, Jon Bernthal, Angela Kinsey, Martin Sheen	
November 14, 16, 2025	Stephen Amell, Enid Balám, David Baron, Brutus Beefcake, Andy Belanger, Linda Blair, Alex Brightman, Mark Brooks, Michael Cho, Mike Colter, Holly Marie Combs, Vincent D'Onofrio, Francine Delgado, John DiMaggio, D-Von Dudley, Peter Facinelli, Mike Flanagan, Guy Gilchrist, Ashley Greene, Marc Guggenheim, Bob Hall, Klaus Janson, Dave Johnson, Jamie Kennedy, Jim Krueger, Phil LaMarr, Jae Lee, Juliette Lewis, Matthew Lillard, Kellan Lutz, Sean Maher, Anthony Marques, Conor McCreery, Rose McGowan, Steve Orlando, David Ramsey, Jackson Rathbone, Brandon Rogers, Don Rosa, Kate Siegel, Tom Sturridge, Sara Tomko, Alan Tudyk, Skeet Ulrich, Casper Van Dien, Mark Waid			
