= Sheva's War =

1998 graphic novel series by Christopher Moeller

- Cover to Sheva's War #1, art by Christopher Moeller

Publication information
- Publisher: Helix (DC Comics imprint)
- Schedule: Monthly
- Format: Limited series
- Publication date: 1998 - 1999
- No. of issues: 5
- Main character: Ahmi Sheva

Creative team
- Created by: Christopher Moeller
- Written by: Christopher Moeller
- Artist: Christopher Moeller
- Editor: Stuart Moore

Collected editions
- Iron Empires vol. 2: Sheva's War: ISBN 1-59307-110-8

Sheva's War is a five-issue fully painted limited series graphic novel published in 1998. It was the final title to be released under the short-lived DC Comics imprint Helix.

Created, written and painted by Christopher Moeller, the story is the second to be set in Moeller's futuristic Iron Empires universe following publication of the Faith Conquers limited series by Dark Horse in 1994.

== Plot synopsis ==
The Iron Empires comprise eight nations of peoples scattered across the Milky Way galaxy, being representative of the remains of a decaying human civilization which was once immeasurably vast. For millennia, the alien Vaylen, a parasitic worm-like race, have rolled back the frontiers of inhabited human space, invading the minds of their conquered hosts and gradually eroding human control throughout the galaxy.

Ahmi Sheva is the once-young, beautiful and restless baroness of Taramai, a planet located within the boundaries of the Karsan League. She is also a soldier by training and holds the rank of captain in the planetary Landwehr. Frustrated with life in the company of her much older husband and bored by dalliances with a string of younger lovers, Sheva assumes command of local forces when the Ganasch, the deformed ape-like minions of the Vaylen, first infiltrate and then invade her planet.

As the narrative unfolds, Sheva is courted by the visiting Philippe of Artois, Count of Karishun, her former mentor and commander and also initiates a new romance with Hardi Degas, a farm-boy turned soldier. She must lead the resistance of her vastly outnumbered Taramai forces against the incursions of the Vaylen in a series of conflicts ranging up and down the deep forested valleys of her planet.

Both the Vaylen and the human nobility employ mind-control techniques to optimise the performance of their forces. Indeed, the Vaylen share an acknowledged parasitic relationship with their hosts and as the series progresses treachery rises to the surface of the human defence initiative:

Karishun: Look at them down there, Rhiannon. Toiling away like insects. And they have the effrontery to call your people worms. As if they were any better.
Rhiannon: You undervalue your kinsmen, my Lord. Six thousand Vaylen clans have crossed into human space by now. The greatest invasion in three centuries. Our leaders are realistic. They know what war will bring. Hundreds of our clans, their fortunes invested in fleets, will be ruined. Great lineages will be extinguished on the battlefield. Our nation will be harrowed by this war. And yet we take up arms eagerly, despite the risks, because without your people, those you call insects, my people are nothing.

— Sheva's War #3, p.3, Dec. 1998

== Themes ==
Moeller's novel has been variously described as addressing the theme of loyalty from a variety of angles, the issues that confront as one grows older as well as identifying the best role in the society when being chosen.

== Other media ==
In 2006, Burning Wheel released the award-winning Burning Empires role-playing game designed by Luke Crane based on the fictional works of Christopher Moeller. Background material contained in the manual drew heavily upon Moeller's plot and literary devices featured in Sheva's War.

== Collected editions ==
In 2004, Dark Horse Comics re-released Sheva's War in a collected edition trade paperback:

- Iron Empires vol. 2: Sheva's War, by Christopher Moeller, Dark Horse Comics (2004), 160 pp, ISBN 978-1-59307-110-3
