= Mouse Guard Roleplaying Game =

Fantasy tabletop role-playing game

- First edition cover
- Designers: Luke Crane
- Illustrators: David Petersen
- Publishers: Archaia Studios Press
- Publication: 24 December 2008; 17 years ago
- Genres: Fantasy tabletop role-playing game
- Systems: Based on The Burning Wheel
- Players: 2–6
- Chance: Dice rolling
- Skills: Cooperation; Role-playing; Strategy; Problem solving
- Website: mouseguard.net/rpg
- ISBN: 978-1-932386-88-2

The Mouse Guard Roleplaying Game is a fantasy tabletop role-playing game designed by Luke Crane and illustrated by David Petersen. Based on Petersen's Mouse Guard comic book series, it adapts the setting and tone of the original stories using a streamlined version of Crane's The Burning Wheel system. The game was first published by Archaia Studios Press in December 2008, followed by a deluxe boxed set in 2011 and a second edition in 2015.

Set in a medieval-inspired fantasy world populated by anthropomorphic mice, the game focuses on the Mouse Guard, an order sworn to protect their kin from predators and other threats. Emphasising cooperation, duty, and survival, it combines tactical gameplay with narrative role-playing. The Mouse Guard Roleplaying Game received critical acclaim and won several major awards, including the Origins Award for Best Roleplaying Game and multiple Indie RPG Awards.

== Publication history ==
The Mouse Guard Roleplaying Game was published in hardback on 24 December 2008; a deluxe boxed set was released in 2011. A second edition of the game was released on 3 November 2015.

== Setting ==
Mouse Guard is a medieval-inspired fantasy setting centred on an order of anthropomorphic mouse rangers who protect their fellow mice from predators and other threats. Created by David Petersen for his Eisner Award-winning comic series, the setting portrays a hidden mouse civilization built within a natural world that is vast and perilous from their perspective.

For the role-playing game, Petersen collaborated with designer Luke Crane to expand many aspects of the setting that were only hinted at in the comics, such as the process by which a mouse becomes a member of the Guard and the structure of their patrols. The game allows players to explore stories set during any season and to create their own patrols and missions within the established world. Petersen contributed around sixty new illustrations and additional lore describing mouse culture, geography, and daily life, making the rulebook serve both as a game manual and as a guide to the broader Mouse Guard universe.

== System ==
The game uses a simplified version of Luke Crane's The Burning Wheel system, based on standard six-sided dice, with rolls of 4–6 counting as successes. Each character is defined by three key traits—a belief (a guiding principle), a goal (an immediate objective), and an instinct (a habitual response)—each of which has mechanical effects during play.

The game is designed for two to six players and requires pencils, paper, and around ten six-sided dice. One participant acts as the game master (GM), who controls the antagonists, supporting characters, and setting, while the remaining players portray individual guardmouse characters forming a patrol. Play alternates between the GM's turn, in which the patrol faces obstacles and challenges, and the players' turn, during which they pursue personal goals and recover from their trials.

== Reception ==
The Mouse Guard Roleplaying Game received strong critical acclaim and numerous industry awards. It won the 2008 Origins Award for Best Roleplaying Game, as well as several Indie RPG Awards, including Game of the Year, Best Production, and Best Support. It also received three silver ENnies in 2009 and was shortlisted for the 2009 Diana Jones Award.

Reactor described it as "a fantastic game which challenges players' imagination and creativity". The 2011 deluxe boxed set was praised by Wired, which called it "easily the most beautiful RPG I have ever laid eyes on".

== Reviews ==
- Coleção Dragon Slayer (in Spanish)
