= Iron Empires =

Iron empires

Publication information
- Publisher: Dark Horse
- Format: Metaseries (series of limited series)
- Publication date: 1994 - 2013

Creative team
- Created by: Christopher Moeller
- Written by: Christopher Moeller
- Artist(s): Christopher Moeller

Iron Empires is a science fiction comic series written and painted by the American artist Christopher Moeller. It has three parts: Shadow Empires: Faith Conquers, first published as a limited series by Dark Horse in 1994, Sheva's War, published by Helix in 1998, and Iron Empires: Void, published by Forged Lord Comics in 2013.

Dark Horse reissued the comics as graphic novels in 2004, under the titles Iron Empires Volume 1: Faith Conquers and Iron Empires Volume 2: Sheva's War. The graphic-novel version of Faith Conquers also includes a painted version of the three part story The Passage, previously published in black and white as part of the anthology series Dark Horse Presents.

The comics formed the inspiration for the roleplaying game Burning Empires designed by Luke Crane and published by The Burning Wheel in 2006.

In 2013 Moeller ran a successful kickstarter for a third volume entitled Iron Empires: Void through his own publisher Forged Lord Comics (created by Luke Crane, Chris Allingham, Thor Olavsrud and Moeller himself).
