= Vibe Credit Union Showplace =

Convention center in United States

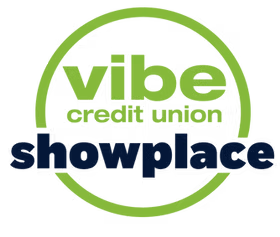

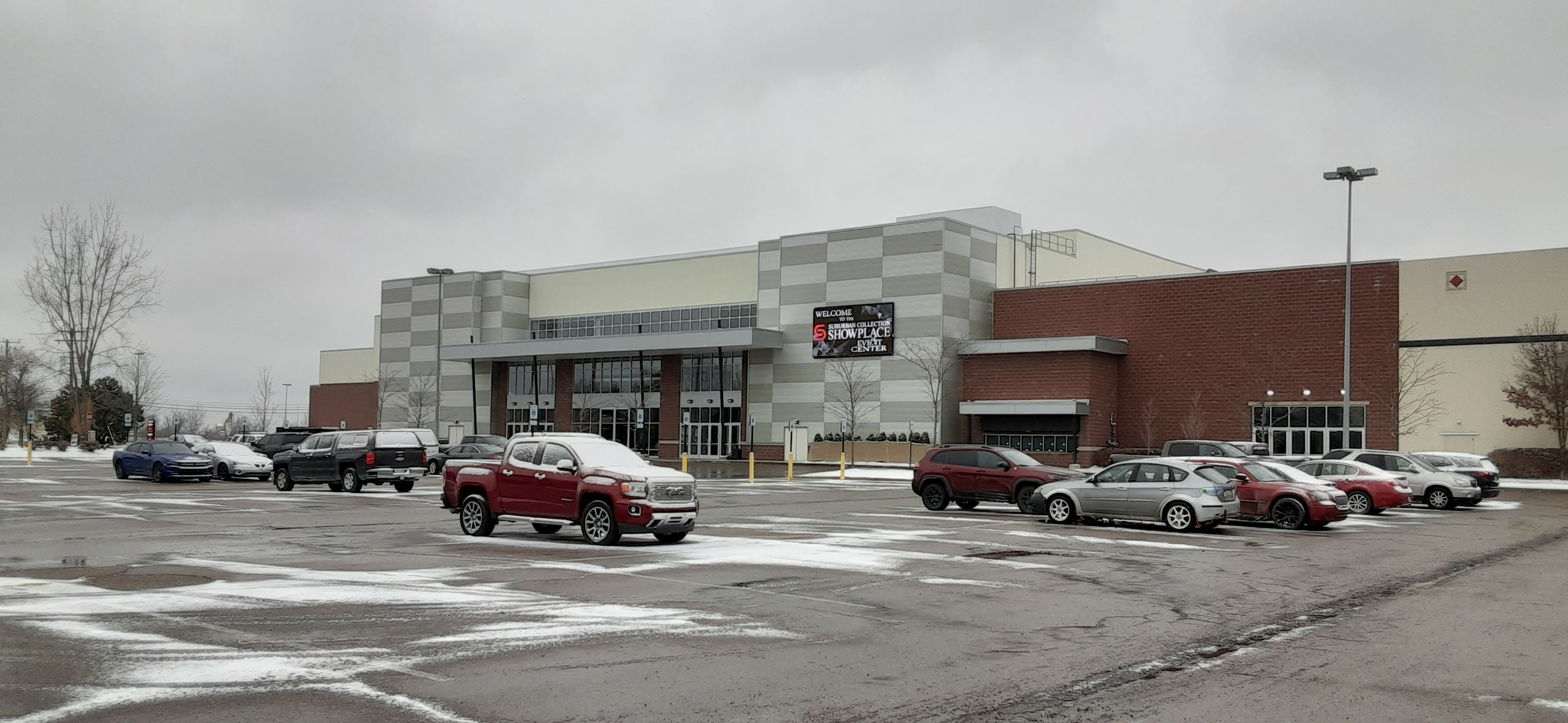
- Main entrance to the Showplace
- Interactive map of Vibe Credit Union Showplace
- Former names: Rock Financial Showplace (2005-2010); Suburban Collection Showplace (2011-2025)
- Location: 46100 Grand River Avenue; Novi, Michigan 48377; United States
- Coordinates: 42.4889367°N 83.5050613°W
- Owner: TBON, LLC.
- Type: Convention center
- Public transit: SMART 305

Construction
- Opened: August 2005
- Expanded: Expansion 1: 2013; Expansion 2: February 18, 2019

Tenants
- Michigan State Fair (2012-present); Motor City Comic Con (2011-present)

Website
- vibeshowplace.com

The Vibe Credit Union Showplace is a convention center in Novi, Michigan. Located off Interstate 96, about 20 miles (32 km) northwest of Detroit, it is the second-largest convention center in Metro Detroit (after Huntington Place). It is best known as the current location of the Michigan State Fair.

== History ==
=== Novi Expo Center ===
In the late 1980s, Irvin Yackness, the president of the Home Builders Association of Southeast Michigan, proposed the construction of a convention center in Detroit's suburbs to host the organization's expositions. He approached Blair Bowman, a local attorney, to develop the proposed venue. In lieu of constructing a new facility, Bowman instead opted to lease a vacant warehouse near the I-96 interchange at Novi Road.

Originally constructed in 1966 as a factory for the Adell Corporation, a manufacturer of automobile door guards, the warehouse was closed when its owner, Franklin Adell, moved the company to Texas in the 1980s. Adell initially leased the building to Mohawk Liqueur, which used it to bottle Kahlúa for sale across the Midwest. When Mohawk moved out, Adell agreed to lease the building to Bowman. Following extensive renovations, the Novi Expo Center opened in the space in March 1992.

The Novi Expo Center hosted the Novi Spring Home & Garden Show from 1999 to 2005, and the inaugural Gathering of the Juggalos from July 21–22, 2000. Motor City Comic Con was held annually at the Novi Expo Center beginning in 1994, moving to the new Rock Financial Showplace in 2005.

In 1994, the Motorsports Hall of Fame of America subleased a space in the Expo Center to open a museum, which operated until 2009.

=== Construction of new facility ===
In 2000, Bowman announced plans to relocate the Expo Center to a new facility, to be built 1 1/2 miles to the west.

The new, $18 million facility opened in August 2005 as the Rock Financial Showplace, under a naming rights deal with Quicken Loans, which, at the time, used its former name, Rock Financial, for its Detroit-area operations. The company later expressed more interest in using the Quicken Loans name, which was nationally known, instead of Rock Financial, which was only well-known around Metro Detroit. Bowman instead terminated the original naming deal, and resold the naming rights to the Suburban Collection, a local automobile dealership group, in 2010.

Following the new Showplace's opening, a portion of the original Expo Center was still used by the Motorsports Hall of Fame, until the Hall's collections relocated in 2009 to the Detroit Science Center. The building was then completely vacant, and remained so until its demolition in June 2012. The land, still owned by the Adell family, would eventually be redeveloped into the Adell Center, a mixed-use complex including hotels, retail, and restaurants.

In 2013, a six-floor Hyatt Place hotel was constructed at the east end of the Showplace, along with a new ballroom and additional meeting space. Later, in 2019, a two-floor expansion opened at the Showplace's west end, with additional event space.

In December 2025, the naming rights to the center were sold to Novi-based Vibe Credit Union for a period of 25 years; it was renamed on January 1, 2026.

== Facilities ==
Currently, the center has 340,000 square feet (32,000 m^{2}) of exhibition and convention space. To accommodate the state fair's anticipated growth, Bowman made several land purchases since 2012, totaling 43-acre (17 ha) of space, including a plot of land across Grand River Avenue and a 30-acre (12 ha) lot to the west.

== Events ==
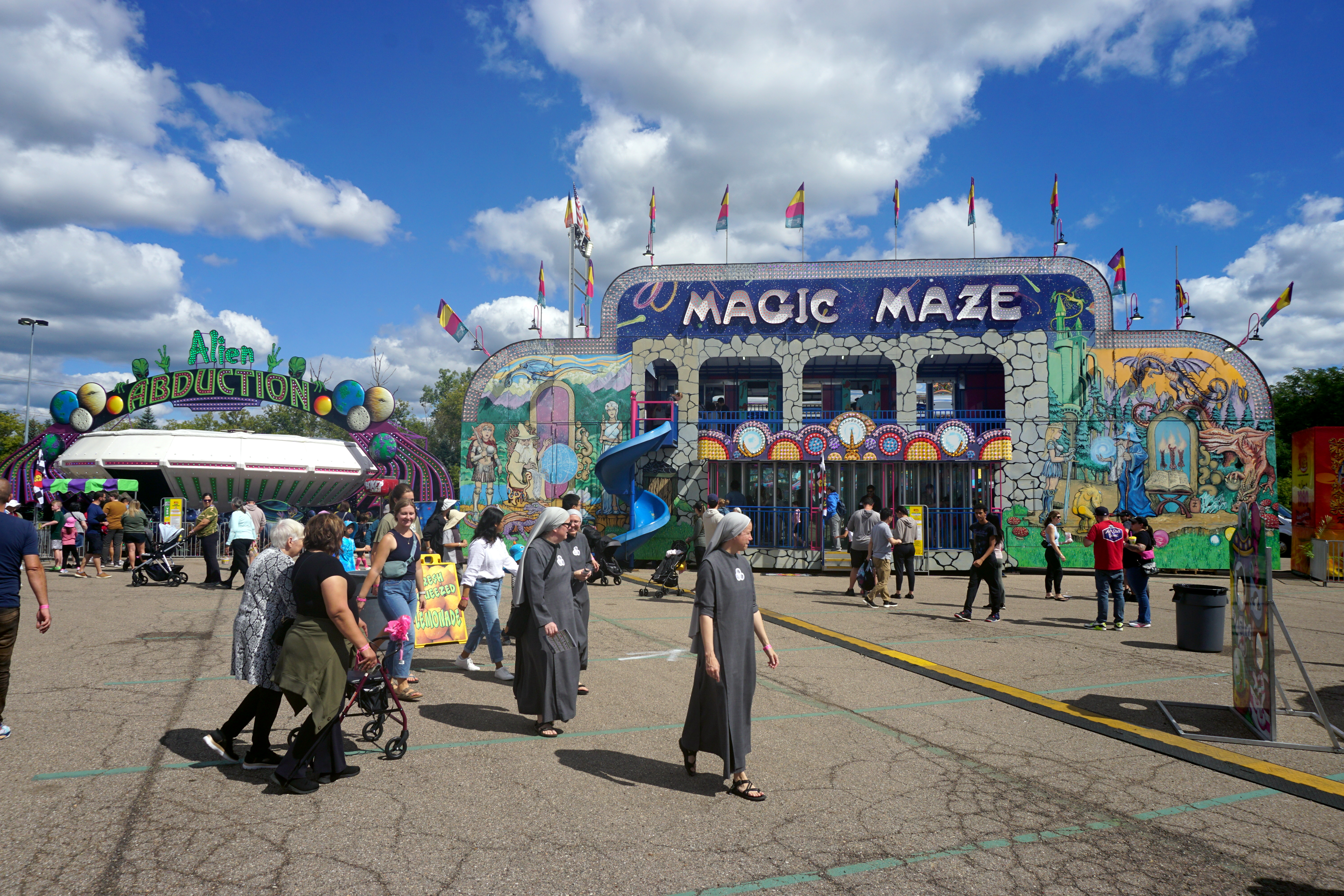
2025 Michigan State Fair at the Vibe Credit Union Showplace

In 2009, the Showplace hosted Ring of Honor's "Aries vs. Richards" which featured Austin Aries and Davey Richards as the main event along with many other soon-to-be-famous wrestlers including The Briscoes, Colt Cabana, El Generico, Kevin Steen, The Young Bucks, and Kenny Omega.

Since 2012, the Showplace is the home of the revived Michigan State Fair.

It has also been the location for Motor City Comic Con since 2011 due to the large space available for many VIPs, merchants, and other vendors and artists, making it a popular place for many cosplayers and other guests to see their favorite stars, artists, and get merchandise otherwise unavailable through stores and via online.
