= David Petersen (comics) =

American comic book creator (born 1977)

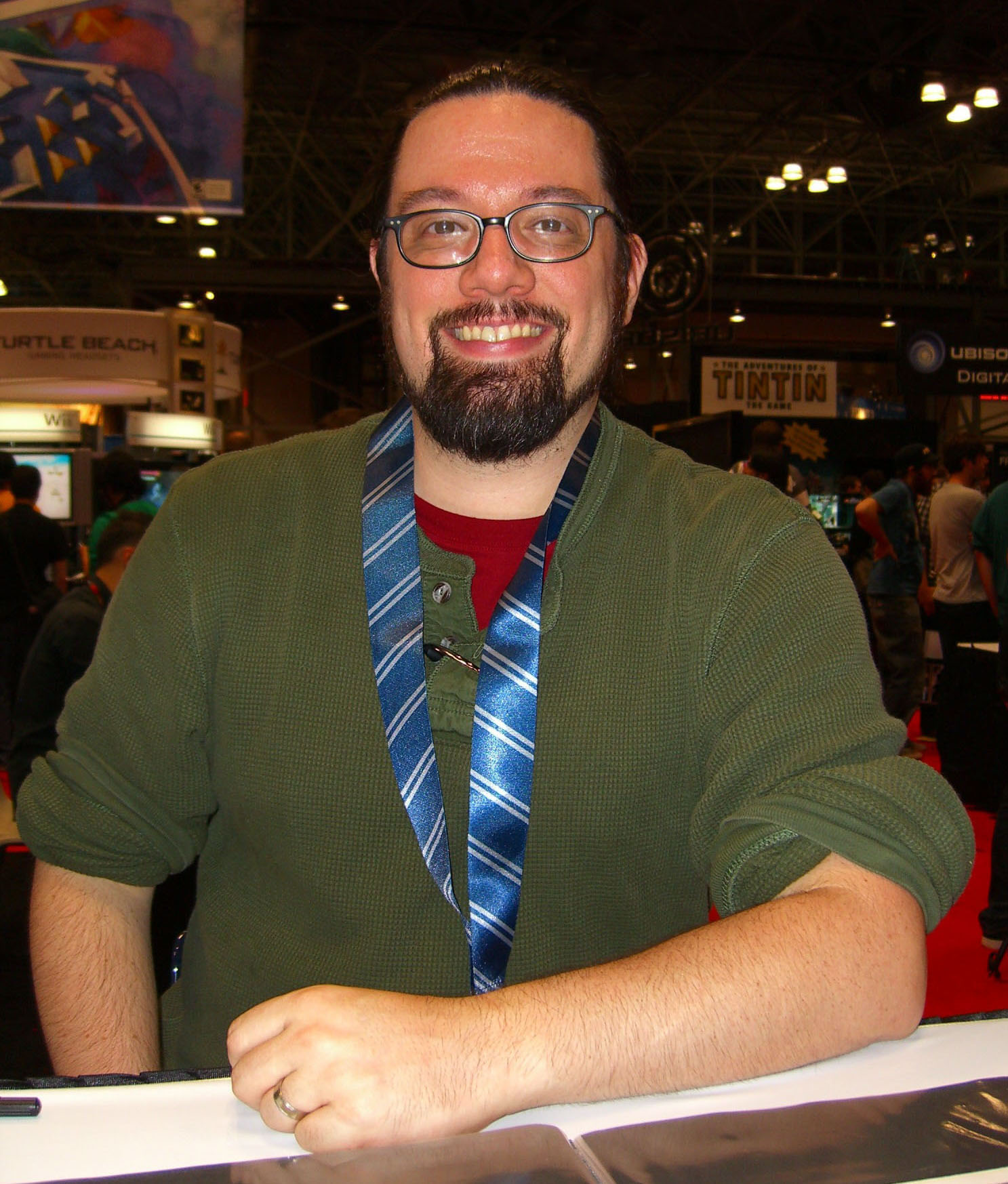
- Petersen at the 2011 New York Comic Con
- Born: July 4, 1977 (age 49); Michigan, United States
- Occupations: Comic book writer, penciler, inker, colorist
- Writing career
- Notable work: Mouse Guard
- Website: davidpetersen.net

David Petersen (born July 4, 1977) is an American comic book creator best known for the series Mouse Guard.

== Early life ==
David Petersen was influenced by animated television series such as The Transformers.

He declared:

When it comes to story telling, I'm a big fan of Mike Mignola and Frank Miller. Although Mouse Guard doesn't look like either of their work. My ink work is something that comes from my printmaking background, something you don't associate with comics, but after seeing some folks like Rick Geary and Gary Gianni doing comics in styles with line quality different than traditional comics, I knew I could incorporate it as well."

And:

I have long been a fan of classic adventure stories and at one time planned on doing a cross between an adventure story and an anthropology experiment with only animals natural to the same habitat as the main characters. It gave me a problem of coming up with story devices and plot to keep everyone from simply eating each other. It more closely resembled Disney's Robin Hood than Mouse Guard. In giving the mice a leg up, the idea of the mouse guard and how the mice hide themselves away became the most interesting focus. I quickly shifted all attention to their story. In doing so have drawn from some of my favorite creators and their work including Mike Mignola, Frank Miller, Kenneth Grahame, E. H. Shepard, and Rick Geary.

Petersen originally attended Mott Community College in Flint, Michigan, and then transferred to Eastern Michigan University, where he earned his degree in Fine Arts.

== Career ==
The first Mouse Guard mini-series established the Guard's origin. Future series were intended to feature more character development, and greater exposition of the book's setting and history.

The story and characters of 1149, which was to be later known as Mouse Guard, originally involved several different types of animals, but during college Petersen reexamined his story and transformed it from the culture of the several other species into the story of life as mice living a sheltered civilization that only walked the open wild if a specialized mouse group escorted them: the Mouse Guard. After establishing the culture of these mice, Petersen felt that the rest of the animal cultures were only distractions for what he felt the real heart of the story would be: "the mice overcoming the obstacles of being in a world too big for them".

== Bibliography ==
=== Children's books ===
None of these books were published for mass release, though Petersen did make bound editions of several of them for presents (mainly for his wife, Julia). All these books have been placed on the web by David Petersen.

- Papa Bear
- Rest In Peace Bailey Bear (2004)
- The Mouse And The Cardinal
- Maddie + The Monster
- What Emma Will Be (2005)
- Kate's Escape (2005)

=== Comic books ===
- Voices (2004, ComiXpress) - Anthology of five comic artists, each having four pages. Released in conjunction with a gallery show. David Petersen's contribution, Fir Darrig, was rereleased in Ye Olde Lore Of Yore, Volume 1. 20 pgs, black and white interiors.
- Ye Olde Lore Of Yore, Volume 1 (2005, ComiXpress) - Anthology of five stories; two by Jeremy Bastian, two by David Petersen, and one by Jeremy Bastian & David Petersen. 36 pgs, black and white interiors.
- Mouse Guard (2006–present, Archaia Studios Press)
- Dragon Prince (2008) #4 Cover
- Mister Stuffins (2009) #1-3 Variant Covers
- Muppet Peter Pan (2009) #1-4 Covers
- Muppet Robin Hood (2009) #1-4 Covers
- Muppet King Arthur (2010) #1-4 Covers
- Muppet Snow White (2010) #1-4 Covers
- Muppet Sherlock Holmes (2010) #1 Cover
- Fraggle Rock (2010) Volume 2 Issue #1 Cover
- Teenage Mutant Ninja Turtles (2011) Micro-Series Volume 1 Issues #1-4 Covers; Volume 2 Issues #1-4 Covers
- Avengers Now (2013) #24 Variant Cover
- TMNT: Turtles in Time (2014) #1-4 Covers
- Rocket Raccoon (2014) #1 Variant Cover
- Star Wars (2014) #1 Variant Cover
- Jim Henson's The Storyteller: Dragons (2015) #1 Cover, Hardcover collected edition cover
- Locke & Key: Small World (2016) Variant Cover
- Farlaine the Goblin (2018) #7 Variant Cover
- Labyrinth: Coronation (2018) #1 Variant Cover
- Beneath the Dark Crystal (2018-2019) Volume 1 Issues #1-12 Variant Covers
- Folklords (2019) #1 Variant Cover

=== Illustrated novels ===
- The Wind in the Willows (2016) The novel includes over 60 original illustrations set into the original Kenneth Grahame prose.
