= Burning Empires (role-playing game) =

Tabletop science fiction role-playing game by Luke Crane

- Burning Empires book cover
- Designers: Luke Crane
- Publishers: The Burning Wheel
- Publication: 2006
- Genres: Sci-fi
- Systems: Based on The Burning Wheel

Burning Empires is a tabletop science fiction role-playing game, designed by Luke Crane and published by The Burning Wheel in 2006. It is based on Christopher Moeller's two critically acclaimed Iron Empires graphic novels, Faith Conquers and Sheva's War.

== Reception ==
It was awarded Best Licensed RPG of 2006 by Ken Hite, and the Origins Award for Best RPG of 2006.

== Contents ==
The core book is a digest sized, 656 pages, hardcover book in full colour, including almost 400 pieces of artwork.

Burning Empires builds on the Burning Wheel game mechanics, while adding in new rules such as:

- World Burner
- Technology Burner
- Infection mechanics
- Firefight
- Psychology
- Alien Life-Form Burner

The game builds on some of the sci-fi elements and scene structure from an earlier Burning Wheel supplement, Burning Sands: Jihad. The game fiction assumes a race of sentient wormlike creatures called Vaylen which infect humans and take over their brains. This infection happens on a massive scale, eventually taking over whole planets in the process.

The phases of a Burning Empires campaign are infiltration, usurpation, and invasion, and these correspond to the stage of the Vaylen infection on the planet.

Typically, the GM or Game Master will take on the role of the Vaylen invaders, while the players will take the role of mostly humans, who are trying to actively stop this invasion.

== Reviews ==
- Pyramid
