= The Burning Wheel =

Tabletop fantasy role-playing game by Luke Crane

- Burning Wheel and Character Burner
- Designers: Luke Crane
- Publishers: Luke Crane
- Publication: 2002
- Genres: Fantasy
- Systems: Custom

The Burning Wheel is a fantasy tabletop role-playing game independently written and published by Luke Crane. The game uses a dice pool mechanic (using only standard six-sided dice) for task resolution and a character generation system that tracks the history and experiences of new characters from birth to the point they begin adventuring.

== Characters and monsters ==
The Character Burner contains rules and biographical elements for generating Humans, Dwarves, Elves, and Orcs as characters, providing each with unique exceptions or additions to the overall game mechanics. Humans have access to Sorcery and miraculous Faith, Elves have a Grief statistic and spell-songs, Dwarves have Greed, and Orcs have blasphemous Hatred.

The Monster Burner supplement includes pre-made monsters as well as mechanics and backstories for designing and building custom monsters, allowing the game to cover a much broader range of adventure and setting. This volume also contains four new and complete races for Burning Wheel: Great Wolves, Roden (a race of anthropomorphic rats), Great Spiders, and Trolls.

== Setting ==
The core game does not include a dedicated setting, but there are three setting supplements. In the core game, the rules, mechanics and backstory elements used in character generation imply a fantasy world by default, but can be easily modified, and the game includes mechanics for players to generate their own setting content during play, in the form of Wises and Circles tests.

The game has had three dedicated settings:

January 2004: Under a Serpent Sun is a dark post-apocalyptic setting inspired by the lyrics of a 1995 song of the same name by heavy metal band At the Gates. It was published as a short pdf supplement.

August 2005: Burning Sands: Jihad is a science fiction expansion of galaxy-spanning religious war. A blog associated with the creators of Burning Wheel describes this expansion as based on the Dune series. It was published as a short pdf supplement.

August 2007: The Blossoms are Falling is set in Heian-era Japan where players take in the role of bushi who is caught between honor and shame, and is involved in a conflict between Shinto priests and a Buddhist monks fighting for the crumbling state of Japan. It was published as a 212 page book, which has since gone out of print.

== Game mechanics and philosophy ==
Players generate a detailed background history for their characters, along with core motivations and ethics (Instincts and Beliefs) that connect them to the storyline and to the other player characters (PCs). Story develops organically rather than being pre-scripted, as a number of the game mechanics exist to prevent the gamemaster (GM) from dominating the game's direction and to help promote co-operation and trust between the players (this is distinct from co-operation among the characters, who may argue or fight within the context of the rules). Examples of such mechanics include pre-negotiated roll or scene outcomes, the 'Let it Ride' rule, and the absence of hidden information.

The GM is encouraged to create problems and challenges that specifically probe and test the Beliefs and Instincts of the PCs, and as a consequence characters frequently undergo significant change in their goals and attitudes over time.

The game also includes a variety of complex, but technically optional, sub-systems for dealing with combat, chases, negotiation and spell casting.

== Publication history ==
The core game includes two volumes: The Burning Wheel, containing rules and mechanics, and the Character Burner, with additional rules and biographic elements for generating characters. The original rules (now referred to as Burning Wheel Classic) were published on 1 November 2002. A second edition, incorporating significant rules and text changes and generally referred to as Burning Wheel Revised, was published on 5 May 2005. A single-volume 600-page hardcover third edition, Burning Wheel Gold, combined the contents of Burning Wheel Revised and Character Burner and was published on 11 August 2011. In every case, the actual name of the game, as displayed on the cover art, is simply The Burning Wheel. The three editions share many underlying concepts, but their rules are not entirely compatible.

The Magic Burner supplement was released in August 2008. It expands the limited rules found in the main rule book by describing a variety of potential metaphysical sources of magic, with associated rules on how those affect what spells can do and how they are cast. The book also contains additional traits and skills useful for magic-wielding characters and a system for creating custom spells.

The Adventure Burner supplement was released in July 2010. It includes three ready-to-play scenarios, a host of pregenerated character templates for all officially supported races, and an extensive Commentary section that provides advice about how best to play the game and use the system for fun and challenge.

Following a successful Kickstarter campaign in 2016, a second book pertaining to the "Burning Wheel Gold" edition line was edited, the "Burning Wheel Codex", which updates the material from the Adventure, Monster and Magic Burner books for the previous Revised edition to the Gold rules, and also adds some new, original material and artwork.

== Related games ==
Luke Crane also wrote Burning Empires, a science fiction RPG based on the Iron Empires graphic novels by Christopher Moeller. Burning Empires shares many mechanics with Burning Wheel, and was released at Gen Con 2006.

Crane also wrote Mouse Guard, which uses a simplified version of the Burning Wheel system and is set in the world of the Mouse Guard comics. It won Best Role-Playing Game at the 2009 Origins Awards. Another game in this line is Torchbearer.

== Reviews ==
- Pyramid - Revised
