= Mouse Guard =

Comic book series

- Official Mouse Guard logo

Publication information
- Publisher: Archaia Studios Press
- Schedule: Bi-monthly
- Format: Metaseries (series of limited series)
- Publication date: 2006–present
- No. of issues: 6 (original)

Creative team
- Created by: David Petersen
- Written by: David Petersen
- Artist: David Petersen

Collected editions
- Fall 1152: ISBN 1-932386-57-2

Mouse Guard is an American bi-monthly comic book series written and illustrated by David Petersen and published by Archaia Studios Press. Mouse Guard comics are published in a square (8" x 8") format, a notable distinction from American standard comics size (6½" × 10").

Series one and two of the series have been collected in a single volume each, titled, respectively Mouse Guard: Fall 1152 (ISBN 1-932386-57-2), and Mouse Guard: Winter 1152 (ISBN 1-932386-74-2). In June 2013, Mouse Guard: The Black Axe (ISBN 1-936393-06-9), a prequel which deals with Celenawe's earlier life, was published.

== Main story ==
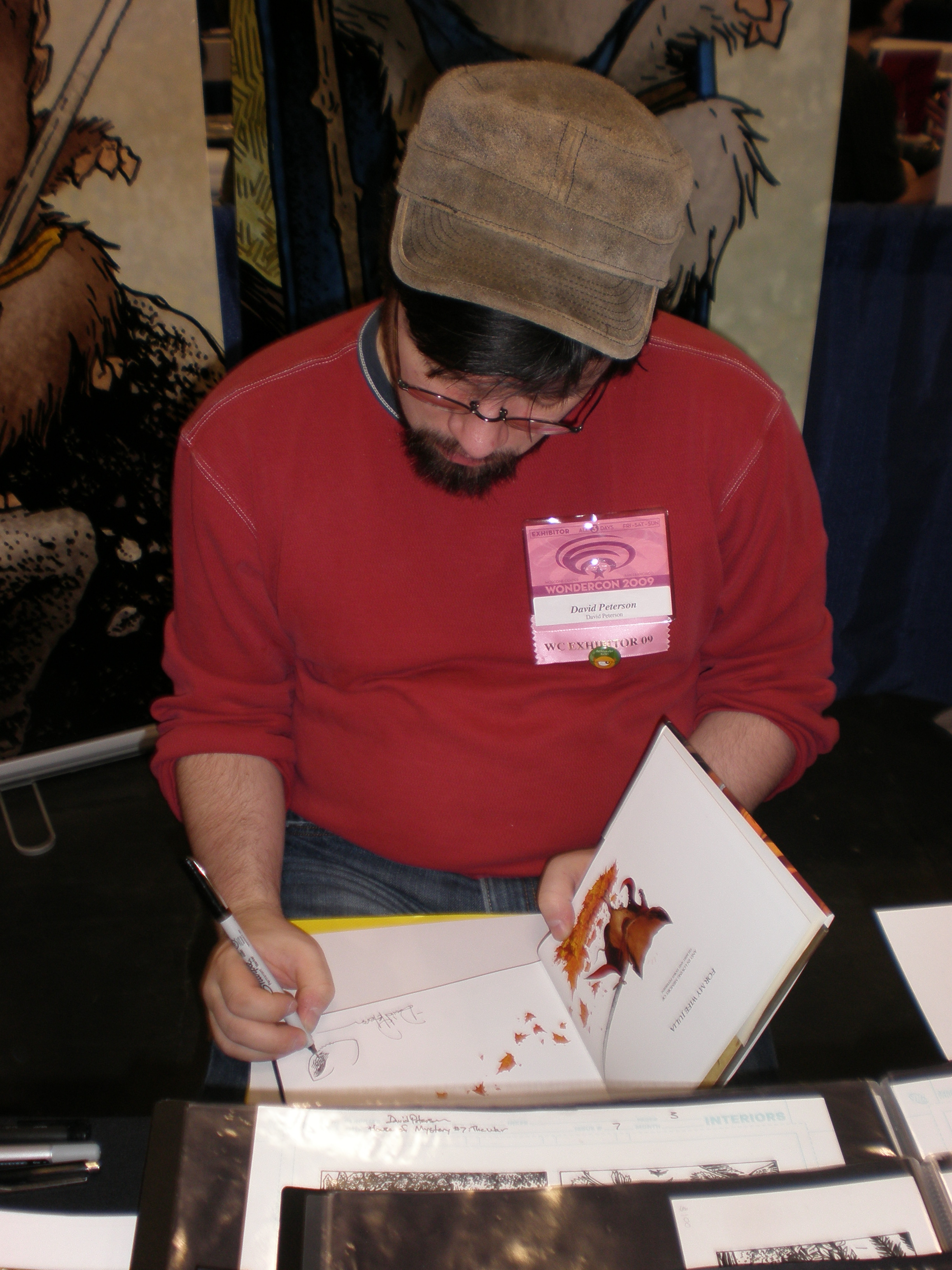
Petersen signing a copy of Mouse Guard: Fall 1152 at WonderCon 2009

Mouse Guard is set in a world of sapient mice who live in a medieval era, paralleling the same age in human history, though in their world there are no humans. Its stories revolve around a brotherhood of mice known as the "Mouse Guard" who have sworn an oath to serve their fellow civilian mice in times of need, including making safe passage for them through the wilderness and protecting them from predators.

The premise is described:

"The mice struggle to live safely and prosper among all of the world's harsh conditions and predators. Thus the Mouse Guard was formed. After persevering against a weasel warlord in the winter war of 1149, the territories are no longer as troubled. True, the day to day dangers exist, but no longer are they Guard soldiers, instead they are escorts, pathfinders, weather watchers, scouts and body guards for the mice who live among the territories. Many skills are necessary for the guard to keep the borders safe. They must find new safeways and paths from village to village, lead shipments of goods from one town to another and, in case of attack, guard against all evil and harm to their territories".

The Mouse Guard are not simply soldiers that fight off intruders; rather, they are guides for the common mice looking to journey without confrontation from one hidden mouse village to another. The Guard patrols borders, finds safeways and paths through dangerous territories and treacherous terrain, watches weather patterns, and keeps the mouse territories free of predators.

== Characters ==
- Abigail is a healer at Lockhaven who secretly shares Midnight's ideals.
- Celanawe is a champion of the Guard from long ago, known by some in the Guard as the legendary "Black Axe", whose mythic tale was thought ended long ago.
- Conrad is a salty, peg-legged mouse who once trained with the Black Axe. Conrad was sent to mouse the seaside outpost Calogero.
- Gwendolyn is the Guard's matriarchal leader who inducted many of the current Guard and oversees its members' assignments.
- June is the Innkeeper of the June Alley Inn. She is hospitable and carries out the tradition to judge the best of tales told by her clients in debt with the winner having his/her debt removed.
- Kenzie: Known for his intellect and cleverness in battle, many of the Guard owe their lives to his levelheadedness. He has patrolled for many seasons beside his close friend (and polar opposite), Saxon.
- Landra is one of the Guard's quartermasters who has succeeded Rand in many of his duties, responsible for tracking the movements of Guardsmice on missions.
- Lieam: Although one of the Guard's youngest members, he has earned the respect of his fellow Guardsmice several times over with his proven heroism and swordsmouseship.
- Midnight: The Guard's blacksmith, he steals the black axe from Celanawe and, dubbing himself the new Black Axe, raises an army that besieges Lockhaven.
- Rand is the shield-bearer of the Guard, charged with maintaining the defense of the Mouse Territories. He is crippled by a leg wound.
- Roibin is a scribe who serves Gwendolyn who is also a poet.
- Sadie is a young Guardsmouse once posted on the Eastern shores who has returned home in search of the camaraderie of other mice. She wields a pair of daggers and is an expert slinger.
- Saxon is a bold swordsmouse, who tends to confront a problem first with blade drawn. Though his hotheadedness is sometimes to his detriment, he is amongst the bravest and strongest of the Mouse Guard. This makes him a fine complement to his friend Kenzie.

== Mouse Guard: Fall 1152 ==
Mouse Guard: Fall 1152 is the title given to the first six-issue miniseries in its collected form.

=== Issue #1 – Belly of the Beast ===
Released: February 2006
ISBN 1-932386-14-9
includes pin-up by Guy Davis

A mouse peddling grain took the path from Rootwallow to Barkstone alone, but never arrived at his destination. Mouse Guard members Saxon, Kenzie and Lieam are dispatched by Gwendolyn, head of the Mouse Guard to find him.

It is quickly uncovered that the missing merchant mouse was devoured by a snake, which the three Guard members dispatch, but the plot thickens as the merchant is revealed as a traitor, carrying a detailed map of Lockhaven, home of the Mouse Guard.

=== Issue #2 – Shadows Within ===
Released: April 2006
ISBN 1-932386-16-5
includes pin-up by Guy Davis

While Guard members Saxon, Kenzie and Lieam were tracking the path of the grain merchant, Gwendolyn has sent word to another of the Guard, Sadie, who once watched the shoreline region of the Mouse Territories, and has to make contact with another missing mouse, Guard member Conrad, as there have been no outgoing communications from his Northern shoreline dwelling "Calogero".

Sadie arrives at Calogero to find it abandoned, or so it appears. She is quickly met by the peg-legged Conrad, who relates that the grain merchant from issue #1 is a traitor who would meet his mysterious master, who always remained in the shadows at Calogero. The duo plan to leave for Lockhaven at first light to warn them, but are surrounded during the evening by crabs. Conrad sacrifices himself to the crabs so that Sadie may have a chance to escape and warn the Mouse Guard of the traitor.

=== Issue #3 – Rise of the Axe ===
Released: June 2006
ISBN 1-932386-18-1
includes pin-up by Rick Cortes and anjindesign.com

Saxon, Kenzie and Lieam, having abandoned the grain cart, have opted to take a lesser known path to the city of Barkstone in hopes to keep as low a profile as possible. What worries them more than knowing of a traitor, is not knowing who the traitor is. They are unaware of the information Sadie carries with her to Lockhaven, nor the fate of fellow Guard Conrad.

Arriving at the mouse city of Barkstone, Saxon, Kenzie and Lieam are forced to create a diversion to avoid watchful eyes. Kenzie and Saxon perform a duel between themselves while Lieam attempts to blend in with the townsmice. Lieam's investigation takes an unexpected twist when he uncovers The Axe, a well-organized anti-Guard group.

=== Issue #4 – The Dark Ghost ===
Released: August 2006
ISBN 1-932386-23-8
includes pin-up by Mark Smylie

Hiding within the ranks of the mysterious militia known only as 'the Axe', Lieam is unaware that his Guard companions, Kenzie and Saxon, have been left for dead outside Barkstone's gates. Celanawe, a hermit and stranger of the mouse cities, retrieves and drags them to his secluded home.

The hermit Celanawe proclaims himself to be none other than the Black Axe, famed champion of the Mouse Guard who has been long presumed dead. Saxon, escaping his bonds, engages in combat with Celanawe, which results in the hermit's house burning down, but not before Kenzie is able to convince Celanawe that they must work together to stop the Axe. The Black Axe's legendary axe has been pilfered, which the two Guard mice agree to help recover. Elsewhere, Lieam is uncovered by the Axe as a spy and he realizes that the Axe's leader has a familiar voice.

=== Issue #5 – Midnight's Dawn ===
Released: October 2006
ISBN 1-932386-25-4
includes pin-up by Jeremy Bastian

The Axe marches on Lockhaven with the captive Lieam. While tracking the treacherous Axe army, Saxon and Kenzie found a new ally in an old hermit mouse named Celanawe, claiming to be the ancient hero of mice: The Black Axe. His fate intertwined with two of the Guard's finest, he offered to aide them in their pursuit, in hopes to hold them to their word of retrieving his missing axe.

Midnight, the Mouse Guard's weaponsmith, is revealed to be the commander of the Axe army. He claims that "the Guard is useless...Gwendolyn exploits us. Cities, towns, and villages hold all the power. And Guard mice are their pawns. The territories need one sole leader. One who can offer security and prosperity. One who is not afraid to hunt down our predators. One who is more than a mere Guard mouse". Midnight then relates a tale of his discovery of the fabled Black Axe, which began when he accidentally uncovered, during the previous year, a secret room below the armory that housed a record of The Black Axe.

As Saxon and Kenzie travel with Celenawe, they privately discuss whether they think the old hermit is indeed the Black Axe. Celenawe continues to impress the Guard mice, not only setting the pace for their tracking but detouring them to higher ground and near a stockpile of weapons Kenzie made years before.

Sadie makes her way to Lockhaven successfully, beating both the Axe army and the Guard's mice tracking them to the gates. She warns the mice inside of the impending treachery and Lockhaven immediately locks itself down.

=== Issue #6 – A Return to Honor ===
Released: January 2007
ISBN 1-932386-29-7
includes pin-up by Jeremy Bastian

Midnight's army reaches Lockhaven as the Guardsmice inside try to stave off the invasion. Kenzie and Celanawe convince Saxon not to try attacking the army head on.

The Axe assault Lockhaven and Midnight and several of his followers are able to get inside before the portcullis is dropped. He nearly succeeds in killing Gwendolyn but is thwarted by the timely arrival of Celenawe, who fights Midnight while Lieam frees himself and fights alongside Saxon, Kenzie and Sadie against Midnight's followers. Celenawe finally subdues Midnight, leading to The Axe's defeat. After Gwendolyn banishes Midnight beyond the scent boundaries of the Mouse Territories to certain death, Lockhaven begins to settle down for the winter and Celenawe returns to the Guard.

=== Collected edition ===
Mouse Guard – Fall 1152

Released: May 2007 HC, March 2008 PB
ISBN 1-932386-57-2 HC, ISBN 0-345-49686-8 PB
Both the hardcover and the paperback include several pages of previously unreleased material. The paperback includes an additional eight pages of "pin-up" art by Petersen himself (not to be confused with the guest pin ups which are also included in both editions).

== Mouse Guard: Winter 1152 ==
Mouse Guard: Winter 1152 is a direct sequel to Mouse Guard: Fall 1152. It is a six issue miniseries that was published in 2007–2008. This series differs in that there are no subtitles to each issue.

=== Issue #1 ===
Released: July 2007
ISBN 1-932386-60-2
includes pin-up by Geof Darrow

Saxon, Kenzie, Sadie, Leiam, and Celanawe are out during a bitter winter that has befallen the Mouse Territories. They embark as ambassadors for Gwendolyn in an attempt to unite the Mouse Territories and aid Lockhaven throughout the winter, for the home of the Guard Mice is short on supplies.

=== Issue #2 ===
Released: September 2007
ISBN 1-932386-65-3
includes pin-up by Stan Sakai

After Sadie drives off an owl by hitting one of its eyes, the group is divided when Kenzie, Saxon and Sadie fall into a tunnel. It is soon revealed to be a Weasel air vent with no easy way out. Above ground Celanawe and Leiam push on home in the hopes of returning with the supplies in time to save both Rand and Lockhaven itself. Working their way through the abandoned Weasel city of Darkheather the trio of guard mice wonder if it is as deserted as it looks. While back home in Lockhaven a poisoner is afoot.

=== Issue #3 ===
Released: November 2007
ISBN
includes pin-up by Craig Rousseau

With Lockhavens exits sealed, the search for Abigail the poisoner begins. Elsewhere the freezing rain forces Celanawe and Lieam to dig in until it passes. Kenzie, Saxon and Sadie go deeper into the former Weasel territory and discover its new occupants, Bats. As the trio fight the bats the ceiling collapses forcing the bats to retreat while Saxon is still holding onto one. Back in the snow hole Celanawe hears something above them.

=== Issue #4 ===
Released: January 2008
ISBN
includes pin-up by Nate Pride

Bats taking claim of the abandoned weasel kingdom of Darkheather halted Saxon, Kenzie, and Sadies's progress through the underground nightmare. In a foolishly brave maneuver, Saxon raised sword against them and was carried off into the darkness. Back at Lockhaven, Abigail the poisoner has been killed. Meanwhile, the remaining bottle of medicine from Sprucetuck is also in danger as the one-eyed owl has found Celanawe and Lieam's ice shelter.

=== Issue #5 ===
Released: June 2008

The battle between Celanawe, Lieam, and the one-eyed owl rages on. Tired, frozen, and with little hope of getting the medicine to Lockhaven, their only goal now is survival. Deep beneath the surface in the abandoned Darkheather, Saxon escapes the bats. He then finds the remains of a former master, obtains the dead master's weapon, and rejoins his companions Sadie and Kenzie and discover a way back to Lockhaven through an underground river that runs into Darkheather. The owl fatally wounds Celanawe.

=== Issue #6 ===
Released: August 2008

Lieam manages to kill the owl with Celanawe's Black Axe. With the food and medicine shortage still unresolved, hares and riders depart from Lockhaven, on a desperate search and rescue mission for Celanawe and Lieam, still unaccounted for. They find Lieam and bring Celanawe's body back to Lockhaven, where he is cremated. A flashback reveals that Celanawe named Lieam as his successor prior to his death, and he later leaves Lockhaven with the Black Axe.

=== Collected edition ===
Mouse Guard – Winter 1152

Released: December 2008 HC, Unreleased PB
ISBN 1-932386-74-2 HC, ISBN Unreleased PB

== Mouse Guard: Spring 1153 ==
A one-shot was released in May 2010 as part of Free Comic Book Day. Three months after Lieam's disappearance, the mice face threats from predators which have come out of hibernation. This ten-page story has frequently been mistaken as the start of a Spring storyline, but Petersen has confirmed that he no longer wishes to name Mouse Guard stories based on seasons to avoid fans expectations of the rest of that year being chronicled. Petersen has gone on to say that when he releases a story that takes place chronologically after Winter 1152, many years will have passed for the mice, but that it will thematically follow Lieam with the Black Axe.

== Mouse Guard: Black Axe ==
Mouse Guard: Black Axe is a prequel to Mouse Guard: Fall 1152 and Mouse Guard: Winter 1152. It is a six issue miniseries that began in December 2010. In June 2013, a single volume collecting all six issues was published also containing Mouse Guard: Spring 1153 as a prologue.

== Mouse Guard: The Weasel War of 1149 ==
In August 2009 Petersen said in an interview with Comic Book Resources that after Black Axe he would start working on the fourth title in the series that would take place during the mouse war with the weasels in winter 1149. His plan was for the story to cover eight issues. He also continued: "I'm scared to death of drawing a war because that's daunting. In the fifth book, we're coming back to this time-line post-winter". Recently however the comic's progress has slowed down due to Petersen's personal family matters regarding his mother being afflicted with Parkinson's disease.

== Mouse Guard: Legends of the Guard ==
A miniseries anthology spin-off, featuring stories from the Mouse Guard world by other creators, including Jeremy Bastian, Nate Pride, and Mark Smylie, was published in four issues, with a single-volume collected edition published in November 2010 (ISBN 978-1932386943). It won the Eisner Award in 2011 for Best Anthology.

A second volume of Legends of the Guard was published in December 2013, and volume 3 was published in December 2015.

Volume One:

- "The Battle of the Hawk's Mouse & the Fox's Mouse" (art & story by Jeremy Bastian)
- "A Bargain in the Dark" (art & story by Ted Naifeh)
- "Oleg the Wise" (art & story by Alex Sheikman, colors by Scott Keating)
- "Potential" (art by Sean Rubin, story by Alex Kain)
- "The Shrike and the Toad" (art & story by Terry Moore)
- "Worley & the Mink" (art by Gene Ha, story by Lowell Francis)
- "A Mouse Named Fox" (art & story by Katie Cook)
- "The Critic" (art & story by Guy Davis)
- "The Ballad of Nettledown" (art & story by Nate Pride)
- "The Raven" (art & story by Jason Shawn Alexander)
- "The Lion and the Mouse" (art & story by Craig Rousseau)
- "Bowen's Tale" (art & story by Karl Kerschl)
- "Crown of Silver, Crown of Gold" (art & story by Mark Smylie)
- Epilogue (art & story by João Lemos)

Volume Two:

- "Autumn Tale" (art & story by Stan Sakai)
- "Leviathan Art" (art & story by Nick Tapalansky)
- "A Bone to Pick" (art & story by Ben Caldwell)
- "Love of the Sea" (art & story by Christian Slade)
- "Over the Falls" (art & story by Rick Geary)
- "The Shade" (art & story by Jemma Salume)
- "The Mouse Generals" (art & story by Eric Canete, colors by Scott Keating)
- "When Moles Are Around" (art & story by C.P. Wilson III)
- "The Thief, the Star-Gazer, the Hunter, & the Tailor" (art & story by Cory Godbey)
- "The Veteran" (art & story by Bill Willingham, colors and letters by Brad Thomte)
- "Back & Forth" (art & story by Jackson Sze, letters by Nate Pride)
- "The Timber Mice" (art by Justin Gerard, music by Cliff Monear)
- "Just a Printer" (art & story by Dirk Shearer)

Volume Three:

- "The Gosling and the Ghost" (art & story by Mark Buckingham, colors Lee Loughridge, letters Todd Klein)
- "The Mouse and the Moon" (art & story by Skottie Young)
- "The Armor Maker" (art & story by Hannah Christenson)
- "The Fall of Brierwall" (art by Nicole Gustafsson, story by C.M. Galdre)
- "Fallen" (art & story by Dustin Nguyen)
- "The Dancers" (art & story by Kyla Vanderklugt)
- "Nain Rouge" (art & story by Mark A. Nelson, letters by Willie Schubert)
- "The Inventor" (art & story by Jake Parker, colors by Cam Kendell)
- "The Tale of Abdiel's Heart" (art & story by Ramón K. Pérez)
- "The Lament of Poor Lenora" (art & story by Becky Cloonan)
- "The Watcher's Stone" (art & story by Ryan Lang)
- "Deep and Dark" (art by Aaron Conley, story by Fabian Rangel Jr., colors by Rico Renzi & Cassie Kelly, letters by Evelyn Rangel)
- "Good Coin" (art & story by Lauren Pettapiece)

== Mouse Guard: Dawn of the Black Axe ==
A miniseries written by Petersen and drawn by Gabriel Rodríguez, Dawn of the Black Axe will take place chronologically before all other tales, focusing on Bardrick, the first mouse to wield the Black Axe. Petersen expressed his hope that this would be the first of many miniseries made in collaboration with another artist. The first issue is scheduled for March 2025.

== Short Stories ==
- "Spring 1153": FCBD 2010, reprinted as PROLOGUE in MOUSE GUARD: THE BLACK AXE (2013)
- "The Tale of the Wise Weaver": FCBD 2011, collected in BALDWIN THE BRAVE AND OTHER TALES (2014)
- "The Tale of Baldwin the Brave": FCBD 2012, collected in BALDWIN THE BRAVE AND OTHER TALES (2014)
- "The Tale of Thane & Ilsa": FCBD 2013, collected in BALDWIN THE BRAVE AND OTHER TALES (2014)
- "The Tale of the Axe Trio": FCBD 2014, collected in BALDWIN THE BRAVE AND OTHER TALES (2014)
- "The Tale of Oh Day Away": BALDWIN THE BRAVE AND OTHER TALES (2014)
- "The Tale of Service to Seyan": BALDWIN THE BRAVE AND OTHER TALES (2014), reprinted FCBD 2015
- "The Tale of Piper the Listener": FCBD 2016, reprinted THE OWLHEN CAREGIVER (2021)
- "The Tale of the Wild Wolf": FCBD 2017, reprinted THE OWLHEN CAREGIVER (2021)
- "The Tale of the Owlhen Caregiver": FCBD 2021
- "The Tale of King, Knight, Fool, Villain": https://www.youtube.com/watch?v=A1lm_necUII
- "The Tale of the Discordant Fellowship": https://www.youtube.com/watch?v=8fy9NoZOgeY (for FCBD 2026)

== Sketchbooks ==
2006: Petersen created a Mouse Guard Sketchbook that was self-distributed, both through his website and at conventions. Each copy had a unique sketch by Petersen drawn on the inside of the front cover.

2007: A second sketchbook was released in July 2007, which debuted at San Diego Comic-Con. This release was 40 pages, black and white, with a mix of pencil sketches, inked convention drawings, and new character profiles. Production was strictly limited to 333 numbered copies.

2008: A third sketchbook was released in July 2008, available at San Diego Comic-Con. This was a 24-page release in full color, utilizing a hand selected pick of commissioned sketches drawn at conventions for fans. Production was limited to 300 numbered copies.

2009: Like the 2008 Sketchbook, this was also a full color 24 page publication of handpicked commissions. Its debut was San Diego Comic-Con in 2009. Production was limited to 300 copies.

== Other editions ==
=== Comixpress edition of issue #1 ===
The ComiXpress printing of Mouse Guard issue #1 from May 2005 is the "true first" printing of the issue. It was self-published by Petersen prior to signing with Archaia Studios Press and limited between 200 and 250 copies. The main differences are the interior art, which is black-and-white as opposed to full-color in the Archaia edition, and the "$3.00" price printed on the cover's top-right corner.

=== Various reprintings ===
Due to high demand and low print runs (Mouse Guard: Fall 1152 issue #1 was produced in a quantity of 8,000 copies), Archaia Studios Press has made various reprintings of issues as they have gone out of print.

Fall 1152: Issue #1

- Second printing (April 2006)
- Third printing (July 2006)
- Fourth printing (November 2006)

Fall 1152: Issue #2

- Second printing (July 2006)

Fall 1152: Issue #3

- Second printing (September 2006)

=== Free Comic Book Day issues ===
- JAN100004 – FCBD 2010 MOUSE GUARD FRAGGLE ROCK FLIP BOOK "The Spring of 1153"
- JAN110002 – FCBD 2011 MOUSE GUARD DARK CRYSTAL FLIP BOOK "The Tale of the Wise Weaver"
- JAN120001 – FCBD 2012 MOUSE GUARD LABYRINTH & MORE HC "The Tale of Baldwin the Brave"
- JAN130019 – FCBD 2013 MOUSE GUARD / RUST FLIP BOOK "The Tale of Thane & Ilsa"
- JAN140024 – FCBD 2014 MOUSE GUARD LABYRINTH RUST HC "The Tale of the Axe Trio"
- JAN150003 – FCBD 2015 BOOM STUDIOS 10TH ANNIVERSARY FCBD SPECIAL "The Tale of Service to Seyan"
- JAN160003 – FCBD 2016 BOOM STUDIOS SUMMER BLAST (Net) "The Tale of Piper the Listener"
- JAN170003 – FCBD 2017 BOOM STUDIOS SUMMER BLAST "The Tale of the Wild Wolf"
- MAY210942 – FCBD 2021 MOUSE GUARD: THE OWLHEN CAREGIVER & OTHER TALES "The Tale of the Owlhen Caregiver"

== Other media ==
=== Games ===
Wrap around cover to the RPG rule book

An official Mouse Guard role-playing game was created by Luke Crane in late 2008. It is similar in design to his fantasy role-playing game The Burning Wheel, using a simplified version of the rules. It won Best Role-Playing Game at the 2009 Origins Awards.

Mouse Guard: Swords & Strongholds was successfully Kickstarted in August 2014, with a total funding total of US$55,001 from 1,216 backers. It is a realization of a two-player light strategy game played on a wooden grid board with eight mouse pawns, and a deck of three types of cards. The game could originally be seen being played by the characters in the Mouse Guard comics, with Luke Crane providing the rules for the real-life game.

=== Figures ===
An official set of PVC figures (Lieam, Saxon and Kenzie), a plush Lieam doll and a group statue (Lieam, Saxon and Kenzie) was also released by Diamond Select Toys.

Licensed pewter replicas of Lieam's sword, Rand's shield, and The Black Axe have been released by Skelton Crew Studio. The studio has also released plush versions of Saxon and Kenzie. In 2013, Skelton Crew released an SDCC exclusive version of the Black Axe that was plated in Gold.

=== Cancelled film adaptation ===
There were plans for Mouse Guard to be made into a film with Petersen confirming interest from a producer and director. In July 2016, 20th Century Fox announced the film with Matt Reeves as a producer and Gary Whitta as the screenwriter. Wes Ball signed on to direct the film the following year in September. In March 2019, Thomas Brodie-Sangster and Andy Serkis joined the film with Idris Elba and Giancarlo Esposito in consideration to join as well. Sonoya Mizuno joined the cast later that month, followed by Samson Kayo and Jack Whitehall in April. Later in April, Disney (which had acquired Fox that March) halted the project two weeks before production was set to begin, after which it was placed in turnaround. Ball later confirmed on Twitter that production was officially canceled. At the time of its cancellation, the film had spent about $20 million on pre-production, and was expected to have an overall budget of $170 million.

=== Magic The Gathering Cards - Bloomburrow ===
- Azure Beastbinder
- Camellia, the Seedmiser
- Helga, Skittish Seer
- Kitsa, Otterball Elite
- Mabel, Heir to Cragflame

== Awards ==
- 2008:
  - Winner of "Best Publication for Kids" Eisner Award, for Mouse Guard: Fall 1152 and Mouse Guard: Winter 1152.
  - Winner of "Best Graphic Album—Reprint" Eisner Award, for Mouse Guard: Fall 1152.

== See also ==
- The Deptford Mice
- Redwall
- The Mice Templar
- The Secret of NIMH
- Mus of Kerbridge
