= The Muppet Musicians of Bremen =

- Genre: Family film; Television special
- Created by: Jim Henson
- Based on: The Town Musicians of Bremen from Grimms' Fairy Tales
- Written by: Jerry Juhl
- Directed by: Jim Henson
- Starring: François Klanfer; Phyllis Marshall; Nick Nichols; Muppet performers: Frank Oz; Jerry Nelson; Jim Henson; Richard Hunt; John Lovelady; Danny Seagren; Faz Fazakas; Jerry Juhl
- Theme music composer: Jack Elliott; Jerry Juhl (lyrics)
- Country of origin: United States
- Original language: English

Production
- Producer: Jim Henson
- Editors: Frank Lorenoquicz; Dino Digregorio
- Running time: 50 minutes
- Production companies: R.L.P. Canada; Muppets, Inc.

Original release
- Network: Syndication (Hughes Television Network)
- Release: April 26, 1972

The Muppet Musicians of Bremen (released on home video as Tales from MuppetLand: The Muppet Musicians of Bremen) is a 1972 television special that is an adaptation of Town Musicians of Bremen, featuring The Muppets. It is directed and produced by The Muppet's creator Jim Henson. Kermit the Frog hosts the special.

== Plot ==
In the Louisiana countryside, Kermit the Frog begins his narration with Mordecai Sledge and Leroy the Donkey, as they approach their residence after stealing items in a boxcar from a railroad yard. When they arrive, Mordecai finds the items are musical instruments, and blames Leroy for the items being worthless. He later scolds Leroy, and goes inside to find his shotgun so he can "retire" him. Startled by the gunshot, Leroy escapes from his owner with the tuba around his neck that Mordecai previously threw in a tree. Shortly after running, Leroy approaches Kermit who influences him to play the tuba, which inspires the donkey to become a traveling musician.

On his farm, Farmer Lardpork approaches T.R. the Rooster telling him that he has outlived his usefulness, and plans to have him for lunch. T.R. flees from his owner, and Leroy finds the rooster hiding in a hayfield. Leroy tells of his similar situation and his musical aspiration, which convinces the rooster to join the donkey and play the banjo. T.R. tells the chickens that he is leaving them, but when Lardpork finds him again, Leroy blows his tuba which startles the chickens allowing T.R. to escape. Along the way, T.R. accompanies Leroy until they approach Rover Joe the Hound Dog along the road. In a flashback, he tells how his owner Mean Floyd threw him out through a closed window after the farmer mistook him for a ghost. Rejuvenated by the companionship, Rover Joe joins them, and takes up the trombone.

As the trio approach a graveyard, they find Catgut the Pussycat sleeping on a gravestone and waiting to die. Leroy asks Catgut to join them, but she refuses telling them she has lost interest in music. However, Catgut sings of her blues which convinces the cat to tell the animals her backstory. Living with her owner Caleb Siles for thirteen years, she was thrown out into a rain barrel full of water for befriending the rats in his pantry. Eventually, Catgut is uplifted by the prospects of her new future, and joins the animal musicians playing the trumpet. At night, the animals rest in a swamp until they see a light from a nearby farmhouse. Leroy decides to approach the farmhouse, and mistakes a gang of robbers (who happen to be the animals' old owners) for a family inside having dinner. When Leroy reports his discovery, the animals are skeptical at first, but the other animals individually approach the farmhouse, each making the same mistake as Leroy.

Leroy devises a plan to circle the farmhouse surprising the "family" by playing music. In the farmhouse, Mean Floyd is scared of "swamp demons" and "slime serpents", as well as the other robbers (Mordecai's afraid of "tree trolls", Lardpork's scared of "bush bats", and Caleb Siles's fears "mud monsters") due to a full moon during midnight. When the animals burst through the doors playing music, the robbers run in fear while the animals unknowingly attack their former owners. After a lengthy battle, the robbers flee the scene and are never seen again. The animals notice a pantry full of food and the stolen jewelry the robbers left behind, and decide to safeguard it in the farmhouse until the "family" returns where they continually play their music. Kermit ends the special by telling the viewers, "And you know, that's just what they did."

== Notes ==
- The special was later syndicated alongside The Muppet Show.
- An audio version of the story was also released.
- In the UK, the special was broadcast as a serial of 10 minute shorts.

== Cast ==
Character	Puppeteer	Voice cast
Leroy the Donkey	Frank Oz	Nick Nichols
Rover Joe	Jerry Nelson	François Klanfer
Catgut	Jim Henson	Phyllis Marshall
Mordecai Sledge	Danny Seagren	François Klanfer
Farmer Lardpork	John Lovelady	Nick Nichols

- Frank Oz – Rat
- Jerry Nelson – T.R. the Rooster, Caleb Siles
- Jim Henson – Kermit the Frog, Mean Floyd, Rat
- Richard Hunt – Rat, Chicken
- Faz Fazakas – Chicken
- Jerry Juhl – Chicken

== Other appearances ==
- Catgut appeared as an audience member in the wrestling sketch in The Muppet Show: Sex and Violence.
- Catgut, T.R., and Rover Joe later appeared as recurring characters on The Muppet Show.
- Catgut and Rover Joe appeared in "The Rainbow Connection" finale of The Muppet Movie.
- Rover Joe appeared in The Muppets Take Manhattan where he was among the Muppets attending Kermit the Frog and Miss Piggy's wedding.
- T.R. appeared in The Muppets: A Celebration of 30 Years.
- Leroy, T.R., Rover Joe, and Catgut appear in the "Muppet King Arthur" issues of The Muppet Show comic series, as well as the book "The Muppet Christmas Carol: The Illustrated Holiday Classic".
