= Jeremy Bastian =

American comic book creator and illustrator

Jeremy Bastian, writer and artist, at Dragon Con in Atlanta Ga September 6 2026

Jeremy Bastian is an American comic book creator and illustrator best known for the series Cursed Pirate Girl. He received an Associate degree in Specialized Technology in the Visual Communication Department at the Art Institute of Pittsburgh. Specializing in cartooning, he graduated in 1998.

== Bibliography ==
- Mouse Guard: Legends of the Guard (2010, Archaia Studios Press) - Contributor, issue #1.
- Cursed Pirate Girl (2009, Olympian Publishing) - Three-part miniseries. Black and white interiors.
- Ye Olde Lore Of Yore, Volume 1 (2005, ComiXpress) - Anthology of five stories; two by Jeremy Bastian, two by David Petersen, and one by Jeremy Bastian & David Petersen. 36 pgs, black and white interiors.
