= Farlaine the Goblin =

Comic book series

Publication information
- Publisher: Studio Farlaine
- Format: Limited Series
- Publication date: 2013–Present

Creative team
- Created by: Anonymous
- Written by: Anonymous
- Artist: Anonymous

Collected editions
- Books 1-3: The Tinklands, The Saltlands, & The Racelands: ISBN 978-0-9890058-3-8

Farlaine the Goblin is an American comic book series. It was created by a seemingly unknown creator who originally went nameless but later revealed themself as the pen name Pug Grumble. The series is notable for being published in a horizontal format(11" x 7 1/8"), given it a distinct visual style.

The series spans 7 volumes, each one exploring a different whimsical land in the Oddlands of Wug, and each volume ranges from 30 to 50 pages. Farlaine, a tree goblin shaman is on a heartfelt quest to find a forest of his own, and each book chronicles his adventures in one of the final lands he explores.

== Main story ==
Farlaine the Goblin is a tree goblin shaman on a quest to find a forest of his own. He has spent years wandering the Oddlands Of Wug in search of a forest and is down to the final 10 lands left to explore.

Each book in the series explores one of these final lands.

== Series List ==
Name	Date of publication
The Tinklands	25th September, 2013
The Saltlands	30th October, 2013
The Racelands	11th December, 2013
The Twistlands	30th September, 2015
The Vaultlands	31st May, 2017
The Winglands	28th March, 2018
The Final Land	19th September, 2018
