= The Muppet Show (comics) =

- Cover to The Muppet Show #1. Art by Roger Langridge.

Publication information
- Publisher: Boom! Studios (2009–11); Disney Publishing / Marvel Comics (2011–present)
- Schedule: Monthly
- Format: Ongoing series
- Genre: Humor/comedy
- Publication date: March 2009
- No. of issues: 10
- Main character: The Muppets

Creative team
- Written by: Roger Langridge
- Artist: Roger Langridge
- Penciller: Jim Henson
- Letterer: Deron Bennett
- Colorist: Digikore Studios
- Editor: Paul Morrissey

Collected editions
- Meet the Muppets: ISBN 1-60886-527-4

The Muppet Show is a comic book series based on the variety television series of the same title created by Jim Henson and featuring the Muppets. The series was written and drawn by Roger Langridge and published by Boom! Kids, an imprint of Boom! Studios. In 2011, the Boom! license with Disney Publishing Worldwide expired. Disney's own comic book publishing subsidiary, Marvel Comics, renamed the series Muppets and published four issues in 2012.

== Issues ==
Roger Langridge originally made a special preview for the comic which was originally to be used in the Disney Adventures magazine, which was cancelled in November 2007.

- Preview Special - The show is about to start and Kermit the Frog thinks the guest star hasn't shown up yet, when Kermit hears a knock at the door. When he opens the door, he finds a baby. The show continues as they try to calm the baby down. Eventually, the "baby" reveals that he's not really a baby, but the scheduled guest star is Babyface Magee, Midget Acrobat. He'd been hit on the head and left ga-ga, regaining consciousness only minutes ago. The culprit responsible turned out to be Sweetums in an attempt to take Babyface Magee's spot. Sweetums is found on-stage singing during the closing number where he then reveals that his mommy is in the audience, and he wanted to surprise her. Kermit the Frog tries to think of a way to give Sweetums something to do that doesn't involve singing, and soon hires him to throw bricks at hecklers.
  - Characters - Kermit the Frog, Miss Piggy, Fozzie Bear, Gonzo, Scooter, Statler and Waldorf, Sweetums, Bunsen Honeydew, Beaker, The Rodent Doo-Wop All-Stars, Babyface Magee, Sweetums' Mommy, Mildred Huxtetter, Zoot, Janice, Link Hogthrob, Dr. Julius Strangepork, Whatnots, Pigs, Generic Muppet Monsters, Bird Dancers, Bert from Sesame Street

The first two-story arcs are renumbered from One, this was changed after the second story arc.

=== Meet the Muppets (4 issues) ===
- Issue #1: Kermit's Story - When Kermit receives a mysterious letter and starts strumming an old tune on his banjo, Robin realizes that his uncle misses the swamp. With their beloved leader down in the dumps, the whole Muppet gang does its best to try to improve Kermit's spirits. The cast tries to cheer Kermit up, but in the end, it's Robin's insistence that his uncle play through to the end of "The Pond Where I Was Born" on his banjo that finally helps Kermit realize that even though the theater is his home now, the pond will "always be a part of me. Wherever I should roam." Other sketches include a "Muppet News Flash", a new musical number called "Bang, Boom, Splat and Pow", a cooking segment with the Swedish Chef, and "Pigs in Space".
  - Characters - Kermit the Frog, Miss Piggy, Fozzie Bear, Gonzo, Scooter, Robin the Frog, The Muppet Newsman, Statler and Waldorf, the Medium, Pops, Floyd Pepper, Four Little Hop-Toads, Rowlf the Dog, the Zimmer Twins, Male Koozebanian Creature, Female Koozebanian Creature, Swedish Chef, Sam Eagle, Beauregard, Link Hogthrob, Dr. Julius Strangepork, Zoot
- Issue #2: Fozzie's Story - When the Cheese Manufacturers' Convention sours on Fozzie Bear's comedy act, he tries to reinvent himself by looking to the past for inspiration. Unfortunately, his Shakespearean homage ends in tragedy, his music hall routine lands him in the "Veterinarian's Hospital" number when Miss Piggy finds out that Kermit has canceled her "Suffragette, Crepe Suzette" number for it, and a slapstick performance conceived by Gonzo leaves him with nothing but pie on his face. But when Rowlf suggests during a last-ditch beatnik sketch that Fozzie just be himself, the bear actually succeeds, bringing even Statler and Waldorf to tears of laughter! Other sketches include a musical number called "In My Merry Oldsmobile" by Johnnie Steele and Lucille, "The Ubiquitous Quilp", and "Pigs in Space".
  - Characters - Fozzie Bear, Kermit the Frog, Gonzo, Miss Piggy, Scooter, Rowlf the Dog, Statler and Waldorf, Bunsen Honeydew, Beaker, Janice, Johnnie Steele and Lucille, Humorous Cheese, the Ubiquitous Quilp, Crocodile, Rats, Link Hogthrob, Dr. Julius Strangepork
- Issue #3: Gonzo's Story - Osbert J. Smedley, the theater's insurance agent, comes to the theater for some routine questioning. A busy Kermit has Scooter answer Smedley's questions. Mr. Smedley needs to know what species everybody in the theater is, but Scooter's not sure what Gonzo is. Scooter asks Gonzo what he is, but Gonzo states that he's never really thought about it before. Scooter asks around, but nobody else is sure. Eventually, Rizzo comes to the conclusion that Gonzo is a "Gonzo". Scooter gives Smedley the answer, but then after realising who Gonzo is, he realizes that having Gonzo in the theater would raise the premium up to five thousand percent. Gonzo assures a nervous Smedley that his act is risk-free, and offers to let Smedley test out his act, which would involve Smedley getting inside a cannon. A frightened Smedley then claims that there was an error and that the insurance company owes the theater 32 cents, and rushes off just before the big finale, which ends up sending Gonzo to the hospital. At the hospital, Scooter begs Gonzo to tell him what he is. Gonzo's reply: "I'm an artist." Other sketches include "Chicken Lake" by Gonzo and the chickens, "Bear on Patrol", "Gumshoe McGurk, Private Eye" with Gonzo in the title role, "Pigs in Space", "Twinkle Twinkle Little Rat" with Gonzo, Rizzo, and the rats, and "Extravagonzo!" (the finale with Gonzo being fired from a cannon).
  - Characters - Gonzo, Kermit the Frog, Miss Piggy, Fozzie Bear, Scooter, Rizzo the Rat, Camilla the Chicken, Statler and Waldorf, Osbert J. Smedley, Sam the Eagle, Marsupial, The Masked Phantom and her nephew, Link Hogthrob, Bunsen Honeydew, The Swedish Chef, Animal, Floyd Pepper, Beaker, Dr. Julius Strangepork, Space Bug, Chickens, Rats
- Issue #4: Piggy's Story - The guest star is Madame Rhonda, a psychic. She gives fortunes to various Muppets backstage. When she reads Miss Piggy's fortune, she tells her that she'll lose something valuable and green, referring to her money (as she takes Piggy's purse when Piggy isn't looking), but she thinks Madam Rhonda is talking about Kermit. Miss Piggy soon gets jealous when she sees Kermit talking to the other female Muppets. Meanwhile, Kermit, who doesn't believe in Madame Rhonda's fortune telling, eventually lets Fozzie and Gonzo talk him into getting his fortune told. Later, Kermit, Miss Piggy, and Madame Rhonda end up in jail, while a police officer explains what happened to his boss. As shown in flashback form, Miss Piggy sees Madame Rhonda reading Kermit's palm and karate chops them both. Miss Piggy then finds out that Madame Rhonda had taken her purse. Madame Rhonda admits to her psychic powers being a scam, and Kermit decides not to press charges on Miss Piggy for karate chopping him. Since the theater is only a short distance away, he decides to walk back with Miss Piggy, but then they remember that Miss Piggy is supposed to be in the closing number. They rush back to the theater just in time for Miss Piggy to sing the final line. Other sketches include "An Editorial by Sam the Eagle" revolving around gullibility, "Veterinarian's Hospital", The Talking Houses sketch, the Muppet Labs sketch, and "Pigs in Space".
  - Characters - Miss Piggy, Kermit the Frog, Fozzie Bear, Gonzo, Scooter, Rowlf the Dog, Statler and Waldorf, Sam Eagle, Madame Rhonda, Janice, Floyd Pepper, Rizzo the Rat, Animal, Link Hogthrob, Annie Sue, Lew Zealand, Bunsen Honeydew, Beaker, Sweetums, Talking Houses, Beauregard, Dr. Julius Strangepork, Officer Hogg, Pigs, Bigfoot

=== The Treasure of Peg-Leg Wilson (4 issues) ===
- Issue #1: Animal, Vegetable, Mineral - Scooter discovers old documents which reveal that a cache of treasure is hidden somewhere within the Muppet Theatre, and when Rizzo the Rat overhears this, the news spreads like wildfire. Animal begins acting very strangely - he's now refined and well-mannered! Meanwhile, Kermit is acting suspiciously cool. Sketches include "Muppet Sports", a cooking segment with the Swedish Chef, Wayne and Wanda singing "When the Lusitania Went Down", "Muppet Labs", "Pigs in Space", "At the Dance", and a musical number by Miss Piggy backed by Dr. Teeth and the Electric Mayhem with special guest drummer Ninja Rogers.
  - Characters - Kermit the Frog, Miss Piggy, Fozzie Bear, Gonzo, Scooter, Rizzo the Rat, Animal, Dr. Teeth, Floyd Pepper, Zoot, Janice, Beauregard, Pops, Ninja Rogers, Louis Kazagger, Gladys, Swedish Chef, Sam Eagle, Wayne and Wanda, Bunsen Honeydew, Beaker, Lew Zealand, Statler and Waldorf, Link Hogthrob, Dr. Julius Strangepork, Ringmaster, Mitch Dumpling, Scorchy Brownfinger, Tarzan, Walrus, Kangaroo, Rats, Whatnots, Pigs
- Issue #2: You May Meet a Stranger - Hypnotist Creepy McBoo tries to cure Animal. Kermit comes back and reveals he hired the look-alike Kismit to act like him for a sketch. The Electric Mayhem tries to get Animal back to his crazy self. Mahna Mahna performs with the Snowths.
  - Characters - Kermit the Frog, Miss Piggy, Rizzo the Rat, Gonzo, Sweetums, Animal, Floyd Pepper, Janice, Zoot, The Muppet Newsman, Bunsen Honeydew, Beaker, Hillbillies, Mahna Mahna, The Snowths, Annie Sue, Link Hogthrob, Fozzie Bear, Scooter
- Issue #3: Follow the Money - Due to the buried treasure, Kermit decides to have a pirate-themed closing number. He instructs Gonzo to go to the library and do some research on who Peg-Leg Wilson was. Meanwhile, it's revealed that Kismet and Rizzo have been working together and planning on splitting the treasure, but then Kismet decides that he'll split it with whoever finds the treasure first, who could be the dwarves he has working for him. Kismet also reveals that he's after Miss Piggy's jewelry. Kismet comes to Piggy's rescue in a melodrama "The Perils of Piggy" and tells her that he wants to see her in her jewelry. Miss Piggy is soon dressed in a lot of gold jewelry, but the dwarves run after her. They soon realize that the gold and jewelry are fake, and they leave her locked up behind the wall. With Miss Piggy seemingly missing, Link talks Kermit into using the robotic Piggy that was in the show's "Pigs in Space" sketch during the closing number "H.M.S. Pinafore" in which the cast sings "I Am the Very Model of a Modern Major General", using a very expensive set on loan. Unfortunately, the robotic Piggy runs amok and destroys the set, costing Kermit thousands of dollars. Meanwhile, The Electric Mayhem attempt to get Animal back to normal by instructing him to hit several fleas thrown at his drums, expecting him to become a wild drummer again. However, Animal has become a Buddhist and is not allowed to harm living beings. The fleas put on an act on Animal's drum set "Julius Prunes Amazing Flea Circus" and they later give Animal a trophy for being the only guy who was ever kind to them.
  - Characters - Kermit the Frog, Miss Piggy, Gonzo, Kismet the Toad, Fozzie Bear, Rizzo the Rat, Rats, Dwarves, Animal, Dr. Teeth, Floyd Pepper, Janice, Zoot, Link Hogthrob, Dr. Julius Strangepork, Statler and Waldorf, Mildred Huxtetter, Uncle Deadly, Wayne, Julius Prune, Fleas, Bunsen Honeydew, Beaker, Sweetums
- Issue #4: Be It Ever So Humble... - The search for the treasure starts to cause damage to the Muppet Theater. Meanwhile, The Electric Mayhem decides to drop Animal as their drummer, replacing him with M.A.M.M.A. A saddened Animal recalls that Bunsen told him that he can stop his treatment whenever he wants, and Animal gives up his pills, quickly becoming his old self again. Kermit finds Rizzo and reminds him that the Muppet Theater is more than just a theater, it's Rizzo's home. Rizzo tries to tell the other rats to stop, but they won't listen. Meanwhile, Kismet tricks Bunsen and Beaker into leaving the laboratory so that he can steal Bunsen's latest invention, x-ray glasses, and use it to find the treasure. Kismet finds that the treasure is in the basement. However, as soon as he finds the treasure, Miss Piggy shows up with a cop telling him to arrest Kismet for replacing her jewels with shabby fake replacements. Kismet tells her that the originals turned out to be fake as well, but Piggy is aware of this. She just thought that hers were the best fakes money could buy. A monster named Rumpelstiltskin is ordered by a dwarf to smash a pillar, which will destroy the whole Muppet Theater and make the treasure easy to find (not knowing that it had been found). Kermit, Fozzie, and Gonzo all tell him that if he wants to break down the theater, he'd have to get through them. Rumpelstiltskin is about to do so anyway, until Miss Piggy informs everybody that the treasure's been found. As they are about to open the treasure chest, Animal crashes through the theater on a construction ball, destroying the Muppet Theater. All that's in the treasure chest are letters written by Peg-Leg Wilson and his wife which after reading the letters, makes them realize that the Muppet Theater itself was the treasure. Soon, the stamps on all the letters end up being worth exactly the same amount as the costs to repair the Muppet Theater, and Kermit decides to take The Muppet Show on the road, but can only afford to travel to four towns. Other sketches include "A Young Frog's Guide to Stamp Collecting", "Muppet Labs", "Veterinarian's Hospital", and an act from Gonzo.
  - Characters - Kermit the Frog, Miss Piggy, Fozzie Bear, Gonzo, Rizzo the Rat, Bunsen Honeydew, Beaker, Animal, Rowlf the Dog, Dr. Teeth, Floyd Pepper, Janice, Zoot, Kismet the Toad, Scooter, Dwarves, Rumpelstiltskin, Statler and Waldorf, M.A.M.M.A., Robin the Frog, Sweetums, Rats, Camilla the Chicken, Vince Shabby, Peg-Leg Wilson

After "Peg-Leg Wilson", The Muppet Show comic book continued as an ongoing series, and started with a new #0.

=== Ongoing series ===
==== Pigs in Space: The Movie (1 issue) ====
- Issue #0 - Fozzie and Rizzo try to pitch a movie idea for "Pigs in Space" to a bunch of film producers (which at the end turn out to be Statler and Waldorf).
  - Characters - Fozzie Bear, Rizzo the Rat, Link Hogthrob, Miss Piggy, Dr. Julius Strangepork, Statler and Waldorf, The Muppet Newsman, Kermit the Frog, Koozebanians, Dr. Teeth and the Electric Mayhem, Sweetums, Bunsen Honeydew, Beaker, Chickens, Gonzo

==== On the Road (3 issues) ====
- Issue #1: Watch That Tiger - With the Muppet Theater in disarray after the events of "The Treasure of Peg-Leg Wilson", the Muppet gang decides to take their show on the road while the Muppet Theater is being rebuilt. Is the world ready for traveling Muppet minstrels? "The Muppet Roadshow" makes its first stop in Little Gideon, Ohio. Miss Piggy is afraid that the show won't work without a theater, and Kermit the Frog is worried that he won't make enough money to pay Mister Weazell (who owns the land they're performing on). To make matters worse, Fozzie decides to take his act solo and a tiger has escaped. Can the Muppet Roadshow gain an audience...and more importantly, a profit? Other sketches include a patent-medicine style version of "Veterinarian's Hospital", "Country Cooking with The Swedish Chef", a performance of "Whispering" by Sweetums and Robin the Frog backed by The Acoustic Mayhem, a "Muppet News Flash", a rendition of "The Muppet Show Theme", and a brief backup called "Alphabear" featuring Fozzie's solo act.
  - Characters - The Muppet Newsman, Kermit the Frog, Miss Piggy, Gonzo, Bags O'Gravy, Fozzie Bear, Hillbilly Cousins of Statler and Waldorf, Robin the Frog, Sweetums, Rowlf the Dog, Dr. Julius Strangepork, Mister Weazell, Sam Eagle, Rizzo the Rat, Chickens, Swedish Chef, Ogre, Scooter, Statler and Waldorf
- Issue #2: His Wackiness, Clint Wacky! - The Muppets hire Clint Wacky as a temporary replacement for Fozzie, and the Muppets also pick up Clint Wacky's writers Mr. Stadler and Mr. Waltorf. They perform at Little Statwald, home to only two families (Statler and Waldorf's families). Clint Wacky tells insulting jokes which the audience likes, but Kermit and Scooter decide they don't want the show to be known for insulting the audience. Scooter offers to write new material for Mr. Wacky, but Clint turns it down, stating that he gets compensation if his material gets rewritten or if he gets fired, but since it's okay for Clint Wacky to quit at any time, the Muppets try to find a way to get him to leave. Eventually, Rizzo the Rat tricks Clint into thinking that Hollywood finally wants him, and Clint rushes away. However, this means that the show is without a closing comedian. Since Scooter had written plenty of comedy material, he goes on-stage. At first he has no luck, but then Dr. Teeth tells him to lose the script and improvise, and Scooter ends up succeeding with the audience. Other sketches include "The Woodland Gerbils", "Pigs in Space", "The Talking Caravans", and Fozzie Bear in "Garbage".
- Issue #3: Box Clever - The Muppets finally return to the Muppet Theater and put on their first show at the newly-rebuilt Muppet Theater. A package addressed to Fozzie (who hasn't gotten back yet) arrives as well. The various Muppets want to know what's in the package, but Kermit suggests that they wait until Fozzie comes back. Eventually, it's decided to put the package in the basement, but everybody (including Kermit) sneaks down to try to open it. Eventually, they decide to open the package. It turns out that Fozzie was in the package (he had enough money to mail himself, but mistakenly addressed it to himself) and Fozzie joins the Muppets for the closing number. Statler and Waldorf are excited about Fozzie's return so they can throw stuff at him. Meanwhile, Gonzo decides to raise money for charity by traveling in a number of ways (covered by Louis Kazagger) including running, moving bathtub, and cannon. He makes it back to the Muppet Theater during the closing number. Gonzo had planned on giving the money to the "Chessington Wasp Society". But due to a scandal, Gonzo changes his mind. Fozzie suggests giving the money to a charity for retired gentlemen theater patrons. Other sketches include "Muppet Labs", "Veterinarian's Hospital", "Pigs in Space", and "At the Dance".
  - Characters - Kermit the Frog, Miss Piggy, Pops, Scooter, Louis Kazagger, Gonzo, Camilla the Chicken, Beauregard, Statler and Waldorf, Bunsen Honeydew, Beaker, Janice, Dr. Teeth, Rowlf the Dog, Gorgon Heap, Rizzo the Rat, Mildred Huxtetter, Sweetums, Link Hogthrob, Dr. Julius Strangepork, Animal, Floyd Pepper, Frankenstein

==== Family Reunion (4 issues) ====
- Issue #4 - The first issue of this arc features the return of Scooter's twin sister Skeeter (from Muppet Babies). Other sketches include "Samlet", "Muppet Labs", and "Pigs in Space".
  - Characters - Kermit the Frog, Scooter, Skeeter, Celestial Beings, Miss Piggy, Fozzie Bear, Gonzo, Bunsen Honeydew, Beaker, Gary Mayo, Sam Eagle, Pops, Anson Anderson, Sweetums, Link Hogthrob, Dr. Julius Strangepork
- Issue #5 - Miss Piggy's nephews Andy and Randy Pig come to stay for a week. They're given some minor tasks to do and they manage to screw up all of them. Also in this issue are a song by Bobby Benson's Baby Band called "The Girl with the Goo-Goo Eyes" a cooking segment with the Swedish Chef, a visit to the planet Koozebane, "Veterinarian's Hospital", "Pigs in Space", and the closing number "Pigmalion".
  - Characters - Celestial Beings, Kermit the Frog, Miss Piggy, Andy and Randy Pig, Skeeter, Scooter, Bobby Benson, The Babies, Swedish Chef, Rowlf the Dog, Janice, Link Hogthrob, Fozzie Bear, Gonzo
- Issue #6 - Skeeter and Robin believe that Robin is being sent to an orphanage. Also in this issue are "Walk Like a Chicken" with Gonzo and the Chickens, The Frog Scouts in an all-mime production of "Death of a Salesman", Wayne and Wanda singing "Mighty Like a Rose", "Pigs in Space", and a closing number featuring Kermit and Robin, backed by Dr. Teeth and the Electric Dustbin as well as an appearance by Beauregard's cousin Mo.
  - Characters - Kermit the Frog, Robin the Frog, Celestial Beings, Skeeter, Cross-Eyed Woman, Miss Piggy, Fozzie Bear, Scooter, Gonzo, Chickens, Frog Scouts, Wayne and Wanda, Beauregard, Floyd Pepper, Zoot, Link Hogthrob, Dr. Julius Strangepork, The Gogolala Jubilee Jugband, Dr. Teeth, Janice, Animal, Cousin Mo
- Issue #7 - Fozzie's mom appears at the theater to fix up an old acquaintance from Fozzie's childhood days. Fozzie told his mother that he was a famous detective and had a girlfriend. He then must pretend to be a detective and makes Skeeter pretend to be his girlfriend. Other sketches include "Wormwood in Bohemia", a poem by Rowlf, "Pigs in Space", "Sweet, Sweet Music", and "The Adventures of Baron Munchfozzen".
  - Characters - Kermit the Frog, Fozzie Bear, Celestial Beings, Skeeter, Rizzo the Rat, Ma Bear, Wormwood Soames, Dimples McSquirt, Rowlf the Dog, Beauregard, Miss Piggy, Link Hogthrob, Dr. Julius Strangepork, Dora, Scooter, Gonzo, Pops

==== Muppet Mash ====
- Issue #8 Part 1: Chickens of the Night - Just as Gonzo returns from his vacation in Transylvania, the Muppets are following the latest trend in entertainment by putting on a vampire-themed show. However, because Gonzo now looks and acts differently than usual, everyone starts wondering if he happens to actually be a vampire! Other sketches include "Casey Was a Bat", "Henhouse of Horror", "Gourmet Time with The Swedish Chef", "Veterinarian's Hospital" with Fozzie as the patient, "Link Hogthrob: Monster Smasher", and "Interview with a Gonzo."
  - Characters - Gonzo, Pops, Kermit the Frog, Statler and Waldorf, Fozzie Bear, Miss Piggy, Camilla the Chicken, Floyd Pepper, Janice, Scooter, Sam Eagle, Dr. Teeth, Swedish Chef, Rowlf the Dog, Hilda, Wuffles, Animal, Bunsen Honeydew, Link Hogthrob, Dr. Julius Strangepork, Beauregard, Hunchback, Rizzo the Rat
- Issue #9 Part 2: That's a Wrap - Statler and Waldorf discover that their favorite act, Calistoga Cleo and the Pharaohs, are going to be performing on The Muppet Show. Other sketches include a monologue from Fozzie Bear, "In the Praise of Older Men", "Muppet Labs", "Link Hogthrob, Monster Smasher", and "The Pyramid of Geezer".
  - Characters - Statler and Waldorf, Kermit the Frog, Mrs. Keppel, Calistoga Cleo and the Pharaohs, Miss Piggy, Poob, Fozzie Bear, Scooter, Bunsen Honeydew, Beaker, Floyd Pepper, Gonzo, Link Hogthrob, Dr. Julius Strangepork, Janice, Pops
- Issue 10: Part 3: Monster Munch - Legendary singer Howlin' Jack Talbot is the musical guest on The Muppet Show. Dr. Teeth and the Electric Mayhem are pleased to be performing with Howlin' Jack Talbot. During the song, Howlin' Jack Talbot leaves the stage and a wolf appears on stage causing the Electric Mayhem to think that Howlin' Jack Talbot is a werewolf. Other sketches include "Little Red Riding Hood", "Doggone Dallas Blues", "Muppet Labs", "Crypt-Kicker Kate", "Link Hogthrob, Monster Smasher", and "The Monster Munch".
  - Characters - Mildred Huxtetter, Pops, Howlin' Jack Talbot, Dr. Teeth, Janice, Floyd Pepper, Zoot, Animal, Rizzo the Rat, Wuffles, Bunsen Honeydew, Beaker, Statler and Waldorf, Scooter, Miss Piggy, Link Hogthrob, Dr. Julius Strangepork, Lonesome Stranger, Sweetums, Gonzo
- Issue #11: The Curse of Beaker - Dr. Bunsen Honeydew decides to invent a robot version of Beaker in order to give the real Beaker a break from his work.

==== The Four Seasons ====
- Issue #12: Spring Muppets - Colonel Marmaduke Bunch and Meredith Gorilla guest star. Floyd Pepper refers to them as "the greatest primate-based song-and-dance act in showbiz". Meredith and Animal fall for each other to the dismay of her former lover, Bruce. Animal ends up leaving her after she ruins his drum set from playing too rough, and she gets back together with Bruce.
  - Characters - Kermit the Frog, Animal, Colonel Marmaduke Bunch, Meredith the Gorilla, Dr. Teeth, Floyd Pepper, Janice, Zoot, Scooter, Statler and Waldorf
- Issue #13: Summer Muppets - The Muppets do a show at the beach. Before they head for the beach, Fozzie gets a letter from The Whatnot Theater offering him a summer position. Fozzie accepts, but since he and Scooter were supposed to do an act together, Scooter has to audition a replacement. Although it's summer, it eventually snows right as Scooter found a replacement in Frosty the Polar Bear. Meanwhile, at the Whatnot Theater, Fozzie finds that the cast is very similar to the Muppets like Dermot the Dog (a dog parody of Kermit the Frog), Miss Tiggy (a tiger parody of Miss Piggy), Doctor Tongue, Bonzo the Great (a monkey version of Gonzo), a carrot parody of Animal who plays the spoons, and a British bulldog parody of Sam the Eagle (right down to wearing the Union Jack flag). Fozzie learns that his gig is as a replacement for the resident beaver Ozzy (who's leaving because of a bigger opportunity). Fozzie eventually returns to the Muppets since many of the Whatnots believe their show to be what performers do until something better comes along while Fozzie always saw what he does as what he is, but wouldn't have it any other way.
  - Characters - Kermit the Frog, Fozzie Bear, Scooter, The Whatnot Show Performers (Dermont the Dog, Miss Tiggy, Ozzy Beaver, Bonzo the Great, Dr. Tongue, a carrot parody of Animal, a British bulldog parody of Sam Eagle), Frosty the polar bear, Miss Piggy, Gonzo, Bunsen Honeydew, Beaker, Statler and Waldorf, Beauregard, Pepe the King Prawn
- Issue #14: Fall Muppets - Pops gets a letter from the Stage Doorman Union informing him that union rules require him to retire at his age, something he doesn't really want to do. Pops trains his nephew Nat Crotchet to take over his duties while Gonzo gets the gang together for a meeting where they intend to switch Pops' birth certificate and then distract the union before they notice that the name is not his. However, nobody at the theater has their birth certificate except for Miss Piggy (who's not thrilled with having to use her birth certificate, yet she also has to go through several files to find it). Eventually, Pops finds his birth certificate, and it turns out he's five years younger than he thought he was (Pops had stopped celebrating his birthday and forgot how old he actually was) and doesn't need to retire. Nat Crotchet reveals to Kermit that Pops lied about his age when he joined the army, but suffered memory loss and mistakenly thought he really was the age he lied about being. Nat had found Pops' real birth certificate and came to switch it in his office for Pops to find, a skill he had learned when he was a spy (which he had failed to mention to the others).
  - Characters - Kermit the Frog, Pops, Nat Crotchet, Gonzo, Miss Piggy, Link Hogthrob, Dr. Julius Strangepork, Fozzie Bear, Statler and Waldorf, Dr. Teeth, Floyd Pepper, Animal, Janice, Zoot
- Issue #15: Winter Muppets - For Christmas, Miss Piggy orders mistletoe and schemes to get Kermit under the mistletoe with her. Meanwhile, Kermit doesn't want to get Miss Piggy a gift (as Piggy will assume that anything that he gets her will have some significance). He decides the Muppets will all have Secret Santas, but Kermit ends up drawing Miss Piggy's name and vice versa.
  - Characters - Kermit the Frog, Miss Piggy, Scooter, Fozzie Bear, Statler and Waldorf, Sam Eagle, Link Hogthrob, Dr. Julius Strangepork, Rowlf the Dog, Sweetums, Bunsen Honeydew, Beaker, Bobby Benson

== Spin-off titles ==
=== Muppet Robin Hood (4 issues) ===
An adaption of Robin Hood with Kermit the Frog starring as Robin of Loxley as he and his Merry Men takes on Prince John (played by Johnny Fiama), the Sheriff of Nottingham (played by Sam Eagle) and the wicked Gonzo of Gisbourne (played by Gonzo).

==== Cast ====
- Kermit the Frog - Robin Hood
- Sam Eagle - Sheriff of Nottingham
- Gonzo - Gonzo of Gisbourne
- Robin the Frog - Squirt
- Miss Piggy - Maid Marian
- Hilda - Maid Marian's Customer (issue #1)
- Sweetums - Little John
- Louis Kazagger - Himself (issue #1)
- Scooter - Much the Miller's Son
- Janice - Willa Scarlet
- Rowlf the Dog - Alan-a-Dale
- Lew Zealand - Rich the Fishmonger
- Swedish Chef - Himself
- Mildred Huxtetter - Maid Marian's Lady-in-Waiting (issues #2 and 3)
- Johnny Fiama - Prince John (issues #2-4)
- Sal Minella - Sir Sal (issues #2-4)
- Link Hogthrob - Sir Swineman of the Sword (issue #2)
- Fozzie Bear - Friar Tuck (issues #2-4)
- Uncle Deadly - Captain of the Guard (issue #2)
- Behemoth - Guard (issue #2)
- Blue Frackle - Guard (issue #2)
- Green Frackle - Guard (issue #2)
- Pepe the King Prawn - King Richard (issue #3)
- Dr. Teeth - Crusader (issue #3)
- Floyd Pepper - Crusader (issue #3)
- Zoot (Muppet) - Crusader (issue #3)
- Animal - Crusader (issue #3)
- Bunsen Honeydew - Himself (issue #3)
- Beaker - Himself (issue #3)
- Pops - Archery Contest Staff (issue #3)
- Clifford - Archery Contest Staff (issue #3)
- Crazy Harry - Archer (issue #3)
- Shakey Sanchez - Archer (issue #3)
- George the Janitor - Archer (issue #3)
- Mahna Mahna - Archer (issue #3)
- Bobo the Bear - Archer (issue #3)
- The Muppet Newsman - Narrator
- Statler and Waldorf - Legendary Immortal Knights

Cameo appearances by Nigel (the one from Muppets Tonight, issue #2), Wayne and Wanda (issue #2), Bean Bunny (issue #3), the Snowths (issue #3), Lubbock Lou (issue #3), Gramps (issue #3), Zeke (issue #3), Beauregard (issue #4), Spamela Hamderson (issue #4), Fleet Scribbler (issue #4), and Andy and Randy Pig (issue #4)

=== Muppet Peter Pan (4 issues) ===
An adaption of Peter Pan with Kermit the Frog in the title role, Miss Piggy as Piggytink, Janice, Scooter, and Bean Bunny as the Darling children, and Gonzo as Captain Gonzo.

==== Cast ====
- Kermit the Frog - Peter Pan
- Miss Piggy - Piggytink
- Janice - Wendy Darling
- Scooter - John Darling
- Bean Bunny - Michael Darling
- Gonzo - Captain Gonzo
- Sam Eagle - Narrator, Mr. Darling
- Camilla the Chicken - Nana
- Rizzo the Rat - Mr. Smee
- Sweetums - Mr. Starkey
- Bunsen Honeydew - Pirate
- Beaker - Pirate
- Lew Zealand - Pirate
- Statler and Waldorf - Pirates
- Floyd Pepper - Firecheeks Floyd
- Dr. Teeth - His High Grooviness Dr. Goldentooth
- Zoot - Zoot Runningmouth
- Animal - He-Who-Runs-With-Sharks
- Swedish Chef - Wagon-Chef
- Fozzie Bear - Tootles
- Rowlf the Dog - Slightly
- Pepe the King Prawn - Nibs
- Louis Kazagger - Himself

=== Muppet King Arthur (4 issues) ===
An adaption of King Arthur with Kermit the Frog in the title role.

==== Cast ====
- Kermit the Frog - King Arthur
- Miss Piggy - Morgana le Fay
- Sam Eagle - Sir Sam of Eagle
- Robin the Frog - Mordred
- Janice - Lady of the Lake
- Rowlf the Dog - Merlin
- Fozzie Bear - Sir Percival
- Gonzo - Sir Lancelot
- Camilla the Chicken - Lady Guinevere
- Animal - Sir Gawain

Cameo appearances by Delbert the La Choy Dragon (on a shield), a Skeksis from The Dark Crystal, Lew Zealand, Zoot, Floyd Pepper, Dr. Teeth, Slim Wilson, Statler and Waldorf, Pigs, Penguins, Rizzo the Rat, Seymour the Elephant, Foo-Foo, Sweetums, Link Hogthrob, Dr. Julius Strangepork, Clueless Morgan, Catgut the Cat from The Muppet Musicians of Bremen, Leroy the Donkey from The Muppet Musicians of Bremen, T.R. the Rooster from The Muppet Musicians of Bremen, Rover Joe the Dog from The Muppet Musicians of Bremen, Mahna Mahna, the Snowths, Beauregard, Bunsen Honeydew, Beaker, Gaffer the Cat, Sir Cumnavigate, Reporter, Sir Mount, Crickets, Geri and the Atrics, Baskerville the Hound, Sir Render, Susan Boil, Swedish Chef, Sal Minella, Bobo the Bear, Hilda, Mildred Huxtetter, Angel Marie, Doglion, Camels, Camel Lot Owner, Tin Man, a Dragon, Scooter, Pepe the King Prawn, Professor Phineas A. Plot, Angus McGonagle, Lips, Quongo the Gorilla, Thog, Kangaroo, Marvin Suggs, Louis Kazagger, Crazy Harry, Uncle Deadly, Bobby Benson, Koozebanian Phoob, Mean Mama, Lou, Gladys, Jim, Pops, Whatnots, Frackles, Cows, and Horses.

=== Muppet Snow White (4 issues) ===
An adaptation of Snow White with Spamela Hamderson as the title character.

==== Cast ====
- Spamela Hamderson as Snow White
- Miss Piggy as the Queen
- Kermit the Frog as the Prince
- Fozzie Bear as the Magic Mirror
- Gonzo as Jacob Grimm
- Rizzo the Rat as Wilhem Grimm
- Dr. Teeth as Doc
- Floyd Pepper as Grumpy
- Janice as Happy
- Animal as Sneezy
- Zoot as Sleepy
- Lips as Bashful
- Scooter as Dopey
- Rowlf the Dog as the Replacement Dopey
- Sweetums as the Huntsman
- Pepe the King Prawn as Spamela's Agent
- Bobo the Bear as himself
- Statler and Waldorf as Uncle Grumpier and Grumpiest
- Link Hogthrob as the King
- Big Mean Carl as Sir Carl the Big Mean Dwarf Eater

Cameo appearances by Foo-Foo, Beauregard, Sam Eagle, Uncle Deadly, Crazy Harry, Dead Tom from Muppet Treasure Island, Headless Bill from Muppet Treasure Island, Marvin Suggs, Angus McGonagle, Bobby Benson, Johnny Fiama, Wayne and Wanda, Mahna Mahna, The Snowths, Sal Minella, Bad Polly, Clueless Morgan, Mad Monty, Annie Sue, Bunsen Honeydew, Beaker, Thog, Doglion, Timmy Monster, The Mutations, Behemoth, Beautiful Day Monster, Blue Frackle, Green Frackle, Big V, Gorgon Heap, Luncheon Counter Monster, and the Dragon from Sleeping Beauty.

There were also brief glimpses of Ace Yu from Dog City, Bugsy Them from Dog City, Clifford, Mean Mama, Beard from The Jim Henson Hour, Slim Wilson, the Yoda Muppet from It's a Very Merry Muppet Christmas Movie, Ernst Stavros Grouper (mention only), Howard Tubman, Rhonda the Raccoon from Jim Henson's Animal Show, Morton the Beaver from Jim Henson's Animal Show, Carter, Baskerville the Hound, Angel Marie, and Banana Nose Maldonado.

=== Muppet Sherlock Holmes (4 issues) ===
An adaption of Sherlock Holmes with Gonzo as the title character, Fozzie Bear as Dr. Watson, Kermit the Frog as Inspector Lestrade, and Miss Piggy in various female leads.

==== Cast ====
- Gonzo as Sherlock Holmes
- Fozzie Bear as Dr. Watson
- Kermit the Frog as Inspector Lestrade
- Miss Piggy as Irene Adler, Nurse Placebo, various female leads
- Janice as Helen Stoneleigh
- Rowlf the Dog as Mycroft Holmes
- Wayne as Julia Stoneleigh's fiancé
- Bunsen Honeydew
- Beaker
- Wanda as Julia Stoneleigh
- Wolfgang the Seal from Sesame Street
- Angus McGonagle
- Rizzo the Rat as Dr. Roylott
- Nigel the Conductor as Dr. Roylott's butler
- Link Hogthrob as Duke Wilhelm Ornstein
- Pepe the King Prawn as Jabes Wilson
- Uncle Deadly as Duncan Ross/Professor James Moriarty
- Sam Eagle as Mr. Musgrove
- Bean Bunny as Spaulding

Cameo appearances by Animal, Floyd Pepper, Mahna Mahna, and Scooter and Skeeter.

== Reception ==
Dan Crown of IGN gave the first issue an 8.2 out of ten, saying "The idea of using a sketch comedy show as a vehicle for various and unique comic strips is borderline inspired. This book isn't just funny, in some ways it's revolutionary."

Eye on Comics gave the first issue a 9/10.

== See also ==
- List of comics based on television programs
