= Christopher Moeller =

American writer and graphic novel artist

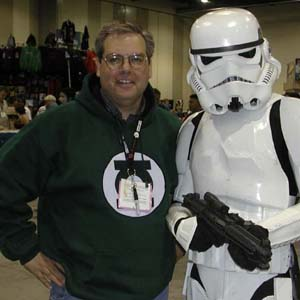
- Christopher Moeller (left)
- Born: May 1, 1963 (age 63) Ithaca, New York
- Areas: Painter, writer
- Notable works: Iron Empires graphic novels JLA: A League of One; JLA: Cold Steel; Magic: The Gathering; Dungeons & Dragons; Star Wars

Christopher Moeller (born May 1, 1963) is an American writer and painter, specializing in fully painted graphic novels. Moeller's signature creation is the Iron Empires science-fiction universe, comprising three fully painted graphic novels Faith Conquers, Sheva's War and Void, a short story in Dark Horse Presents, and a second in the anthology Negative Burn. In 2006, an Iron Empires role-playing game was published, called Burning Empires.

== Early life and education ==
Moeller was born in Ithaca, New York and currently lives in Mt. Lebanon, Pennsylvania.

He received a BFA in painting from the University of Michigan School of art, and an MFA in illustration from Syracuse University.

== Comics career ==
His professional debut was in 1991, writing and painting Innovation Comic's Rocketman: King of the Rocketmen. This was followed by a run on the adaptation of Anne Rice's Interview with the Vampire, also from Innovation, for which he provided artwork and a number of cover illustrations.

Moeller moved to Dark Horse Comics in 1994, writing and painting the first of his Iron Empires graphic novels (at that time called Shadow Empires) Faith Conquers, as well as the short story "The Passage" in Dark Horse Presents #79-81. He illustrated Andrew Vachss' short story "Treatment", included in Vachss' 2002 graphics-adapted collection Hard Looks. He also did James Bond covers, a number of Star Wars covers, and a "pop-up" Star Wars book called Battle of the Bounty-Hunters.

In 1998, Moeller wrote and painted his second Iron Empires graphic novel, Sheva's War, for the short-lived science fiction imprint of DC Comics, Helix. He made a run of covers for DC's Batman monthly comic book Shadow of the Bat. In 2000, he wrote and painted the graphic novel JLA: A League of One. He did an extended run of covers for the Vertigo monthly comic book Lucifer. In 2005, he wrote and painted the graphic novel JLA Classified: Cold Steel.

== Gaming career ==
Moeller has worked in the gaming industry in parallel with his comics work. He has done numerous illustrations for White Wolf Games, including covers for their Aberrant game books, and miniatures game. He has provided over 250 illustrations for the trading card game Magic: The Gathering. He has done illustrations for the World of Warcraft trading card game. He did the packaging art for the Axis and Allies Miniatures game. He also did the artwork for the Burning Empires game on his own Iron Empires graphic novels, and he did both artwork and design for the board game, Burning Banners: Rage of the Witch Queen, published by Compass Games.

== Selected bibliography ==
- 1991 Rocketman: King of the Rocketmen graphic novel (128 pages in four comic books, later collected in paperback collection; Innovation Comics)
- 1993 "The Passage" short story in the Dark Horse Presents anthology (24 pages in three chapters, colored version included in the 2004 Faith Conquers paperback; Dark Horse Comics)
- 1994 Shadow Empires: Faith Conquers graphic novel (later renamed Iron Empires: Faith Conquers; 4-issues miniseries, collected in 2004 in paperback; Dark Horse Comics)
- 1996 "Second Passage" short story in the Negative Burn anthology (co-written by Kevin Moeller; 48 pages in six chapters; Caliber Comics)
- 1998 Iron Empires: Sheva's War graphic novel (150 pages in five comic books; collected in 2004 in paperback by Dark Horse Comics; Helix)
- 2001 JLA: A League of One graphic novel (102 pages, hardcover & paperback; DC Comics)
- 2005 JLA Classified: Cold Steel graphic novel (96 pages in two prestige-format comic books; DC Comics)
- 2014 Iron Empires: Void graphic novel (90 pages, Forged Lord Comics)
