= Luke Crane (game designer) =

American game designer

Luke Crane is a game designer specializing in indie role-playing games.

== Career ==
Luke Crane designed the role-playing game The Burning Wheel (2002), which uses a six sided dice pool, and a "Beliefs" mechanic. Crane also designed the Burning Empires and Mouse Guard Roleplaying Game role-playing games. Crane has crowdfunded several of his own game designs, including Torchbearer. Crane designed the 2010 role-playing game Freemarket with Jared Sorensen. Crane held an annual weekend gaming event in New York City called Burning Con. Crane posted the question "Why are there so few lady game creators?" on Twitter in 2012, which started the hashtag #1reasonwhy, as hundreds of people shared their own stories. Crane also designed the 2015 Mouse Guard board game.

Crane joined Kickstarter after he saw a surge in gaming campaigns on the website. Crane became a community manager at Kickstarter, and persuaded his company to host the arcade game Killer Queen for its annual block party in Greenpoint, Brooklyn. Crane was the head of games at Kickstarter, where he critiqued projects to determine their fan appeal. Crane later became the vice president head of community at Kickstarter. Crane launched a campaign for The Perfect RPG in 2021, but quickly cancelled the campaign after receiving public backlash because of the inclusion of designer Adam Koebel as a contributor. Crane resigned from Kickstarter after this controversy.

== Personal life ==
Luke Crane lived in the same apartment in New York City for many years with three of his friends that he met at New York University in 1991. Crane managed the Manhattan Mayhem women's roller derby team.
