= Erotic comics =

Adult comics which focus substantially on nudity and sexual activity

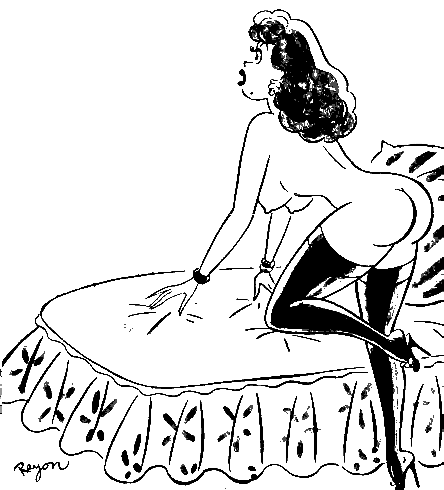
Drawing from an erotic comic published in Gee Whiz magazine, 1959

Erotic comics are adult comics which focus substantially on nudity and sexual activity, either for their own sake or as a major story element. As such they are usually not permitted to be sold to legal minors. Like other genres of comics, they can consist of single panels, short comic strips, comic books, or graphic novels/albums. Although never a mainstream genre, they have existed as a niche alongside – but usually separate from – other genres of comics.

During the mid-20th century, most comics were produced for children, and in North America the contents of most comics were constrained by the Comics Code Authority to be suitable for children. Consequently, erotic comics have sometimes been subject to criticism and extra scrutiny compared to other forms of erotic art and storytelling. Additionally, the application of laws against child pornography to materials featuring fictional characters with no legal ages, have varied internationally and regionally.

== History ==
=== Europe ===
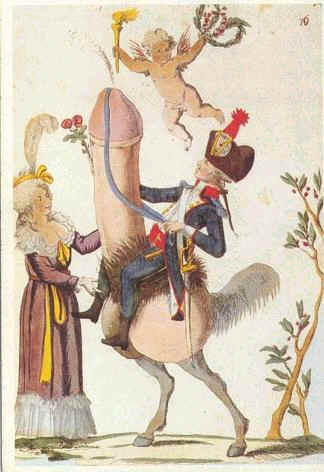
18th century pornographic cartoon Marie Antoinette and the great French general and politician Lafayette

Erotica has been a feature of comics almost since the medium was developed. Marie Antoinette, Louis XVI, and other aristocratic subjects were caricatured in sexually explicit pamphlets such as The Royal Dildo and The Royal Orgy.

In modern times, European countries have generally been liberal in allowing sexually explicit material in comics. In the 60s censorship in Italy led to comics for adults called fumetti neri that were filled with explicit pornographic scenes. Creators such as Milo Manara started as artists making those comics have produced a body of erotic comics since the 1970s. German cartoonist Ralf König began producing explicit gay-male comics in the 1980s. Belgian Tom Bouden has produced several albums featuring the sexual adventures of young gay men.

=== North America ===
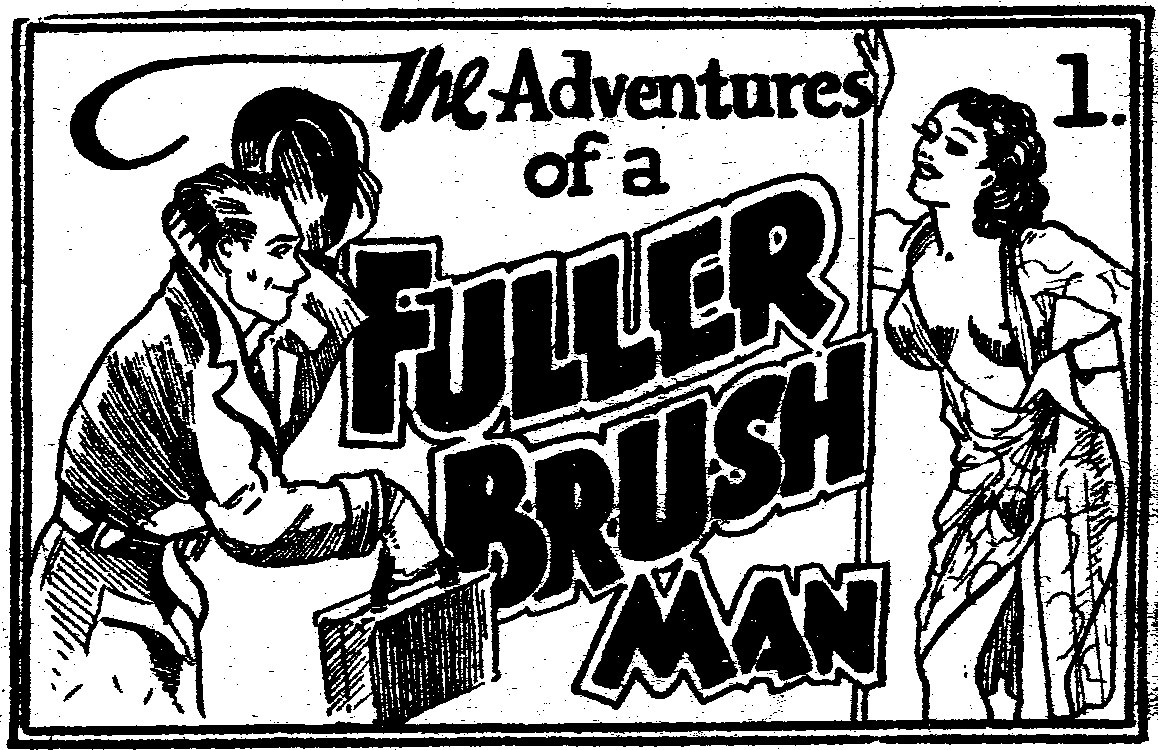
The first eight-page installment of The Adventures of a Fuller Brush Man, published circa 1936

Some of the earliest erotic comic books in North America were so-called Tijuana bibles, which first appeared in the 1920s. They were typically eight-page black-and-white pamphlets featuring artwork that ranged from very good to very crude. The subject matter was usually sexual adventures of well-known comics characters, political figures, and movie stars, produced without permission. Sold under the counter in places such as tobacco stores and burlesque houses, millions of Tijuana bibles were sold at the height of their popularity in the 1930s. They went into a steep decline after World War II and by the mid-1950s only a small trickle of new product was still appearing on the market.

Men's magazines of the second half of the 20th century were common venues for erotic comics, particularly single-panel gags featuring naked women or couples in sexual situations. Playboy magazine debuted in 1953, and featured single panel cartoons by artists such as Alberto Vargas, Archie Comics artist Dan DeCarlo, Jack Cole, LeRoy Neiman, and later Olivia De Berardinis and Dean Yeagle. Little Annie Fanny, a multi-page strip by Harvey Kurtzman and Will Elder, was a frequent feature through the 1980s. Annie had trouble keeping her clothes on, a trend seen also in the strips The Adventures of Phoebe Zeit-Geist, Wally Wood's Sally Forth, and Penthouse's Oh Wicked Wanda! by Ron Embleton. Penthouse would later put out a number of erotic comic magazines: Penthouse Comix, Penthouse Men's Adventure and Penthouse Max with the likes of Adam Hughes contributing artwork. Most recently, Penthouse revived the series as Penthouse Comics and released it in an ongoing bi-monthly format in 2024.

Early comics produced for gay and bisexual male readers often focused on sexual situations, such as Kake by Touko Laaksonen ("Tom of Finland") in the 1950s and Harry Chess by Al Shapiro ("A. Jay") in the 1960s. Comics by creators such as Michael Kirwan and Brad Parker were popular in magazines featuring pornographic photos. The Meatmen anthology series, published from the late 1980s to the early 2000s, featured a variety of gay erotic comics by creators such as Belasco, John Blackburn, Bill Schmeling ("The Hun"), Shapiro, Jon Macy, Dom Orejudos ("Stephen"), Laaksonen, Bill Ward, and Oliver Frey ("Zack"). Although gay comics have expanded to cover a variety of genres, erotica has continued to be popular, sometimes incorporated into other genres, such as the erotic superheroes by Patrick Fillion published by Class Comics, and the wordless graphic novels written by Dale Lazarov.

Some erotic comics grew out of the underground comix scene, such as Cherry by Larry Welz, which parodied Archie Comics. The later rise of independent black and white comics publishers in the 1980s and 1990s include a number of erotic titles, such as Omaha the Cat Dancer by Kate Worley and Reed Waller, which combined sexually explicit material with a melodrama featuring anthropomorphic animals. Other so-called "furry" erotic comics emerging in this period were Genus and Milk published by Radio Comix. XXXenophile by Phil Foglio blended science fiction and fantasy scenarios with sexual situations, and the webcomic Oglaf by Trudy Cooper and Doug Bayne combines humor and diverse sexuality with medieval fantasy tropes.

In 1990, Fantagraphics established their Eros Comix imprint, reprinting titles by Wally Wood and Frank Thorne, Gilbert Hernandez' Birdland, and dozens of other titles, eventually producing a backlist library of over 40 collected editions. The imprint was popular enough that it is credited with making the company – otherwise known for its "artistic" and "literary" works – financially solvent. By the late 1990s, the imprint was no longer profitable, and discontinued releasing new material.

In 2012, Iron Circus Comics revived the indie title Smut Peddler as a brand of erotic comics created by and for women (with male co-creators allowed on female-led teams), publishing both paperback anthologies of short stories, and longer stand-alone features.

=== Japan ===
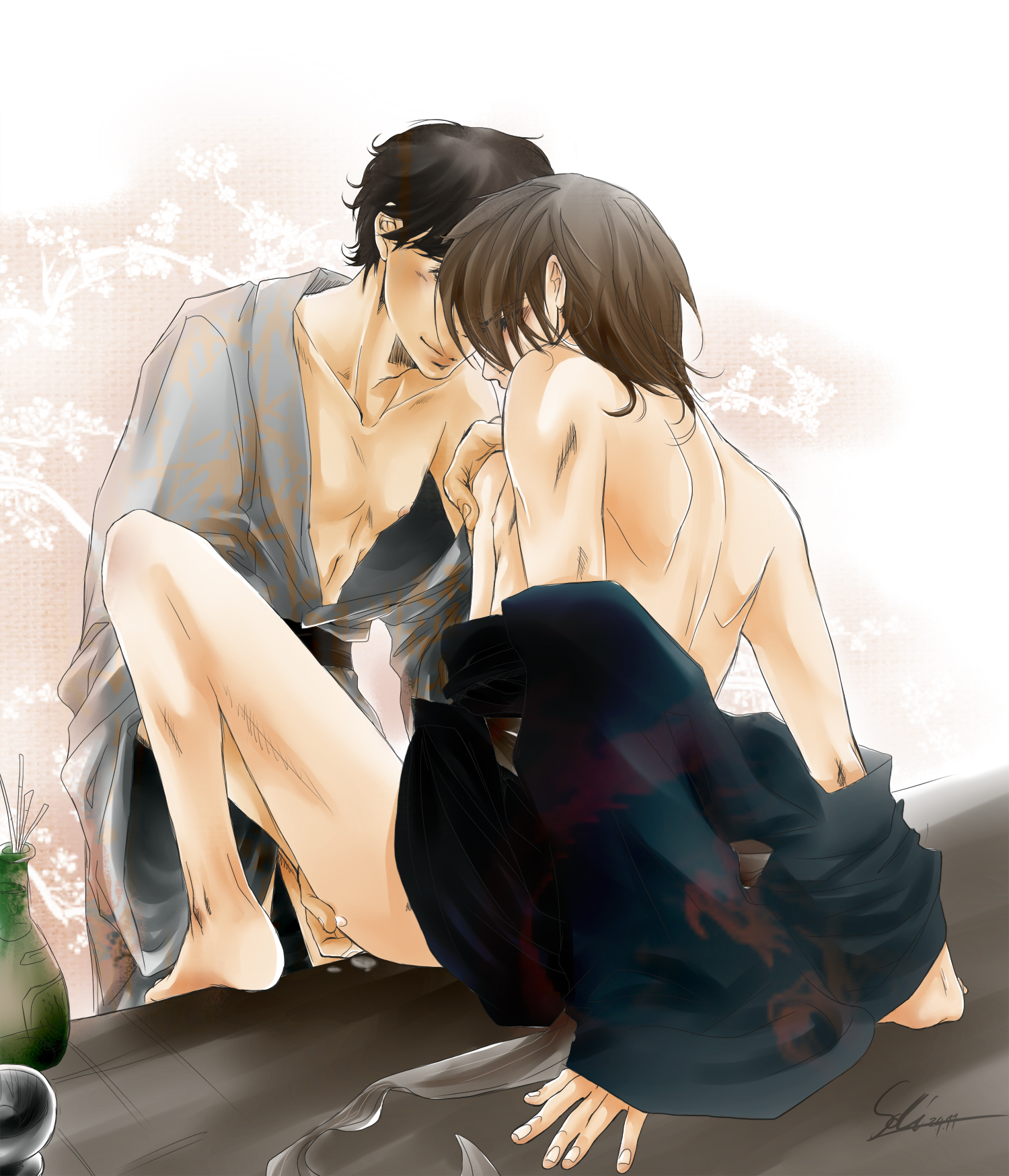
Pairings of young men are a common theme of yaoi manga.

Sexual images have long been a part of Japanese illustrated art, such as The Dream of the Fisherman's Wife which depicts a woman in sexual congress with two octopuses. Such works were largely suppressed by the government, however.

As the Japanese manga ("comics") market developed after World War II, erotic dramas such as Ero Mangatropa (1973), Erogenica (1975), and Alice (1977) were produced.

In 1979, manga artist Azuma Hideo produced Cybele, which featured sexually explicit stories with characters drawn in a cute, "cartoony" style, which led to the rise of lolicon anthologies featuring precocious girls, such as Lemon People and Petit Apple Pie. Shotacon, a corresponding genre of erotic comics featuring precocious boys also developed. Erotic manga aimed at men are referred to as "seijin-muke manga" (成人向け漫画) or "ero manga", and those aimed at women are called "ladies comics" (レーディーズ・コミック).

In the 1970s, shōjo manga ("comics for girls") began featuring platonic relationship stories between boys, which developed into yaoi. This genre, created primarily by women for female readers, features stories of young men in romantic and sexual relationships, many of which are sexually explicit.

In the 1980s, Gengoroh Tagame began producing erotic manga drawn from his own sexual interests, featuring large, masculine men engaging in sadomasochistic sex with each other. Around these works developed the genre of bara manga, which features men in stories written for gay and bisexual men.

=== India ===
Although production and distribution of pornography is illegal in India, it remains popular, and a small industry of erotic comics has developed there in the early 21st century.

The series Savita Bhabhi, about the sexual adventures of a bored, emotionally neglected housewife, has challenged these legal restrictions. Kirtu, the publisher of the webcomic also publishes other erotic comics series online on its website. Savita Bhabhi was later adapted into an animated web film of the same name in 2013 by Kirtu.

== See also ==
- Legal status of drawn pornography depicting minors
- Cartoon pornography
