= Adult comics =

Comics intended primarily or strictly for adult readers

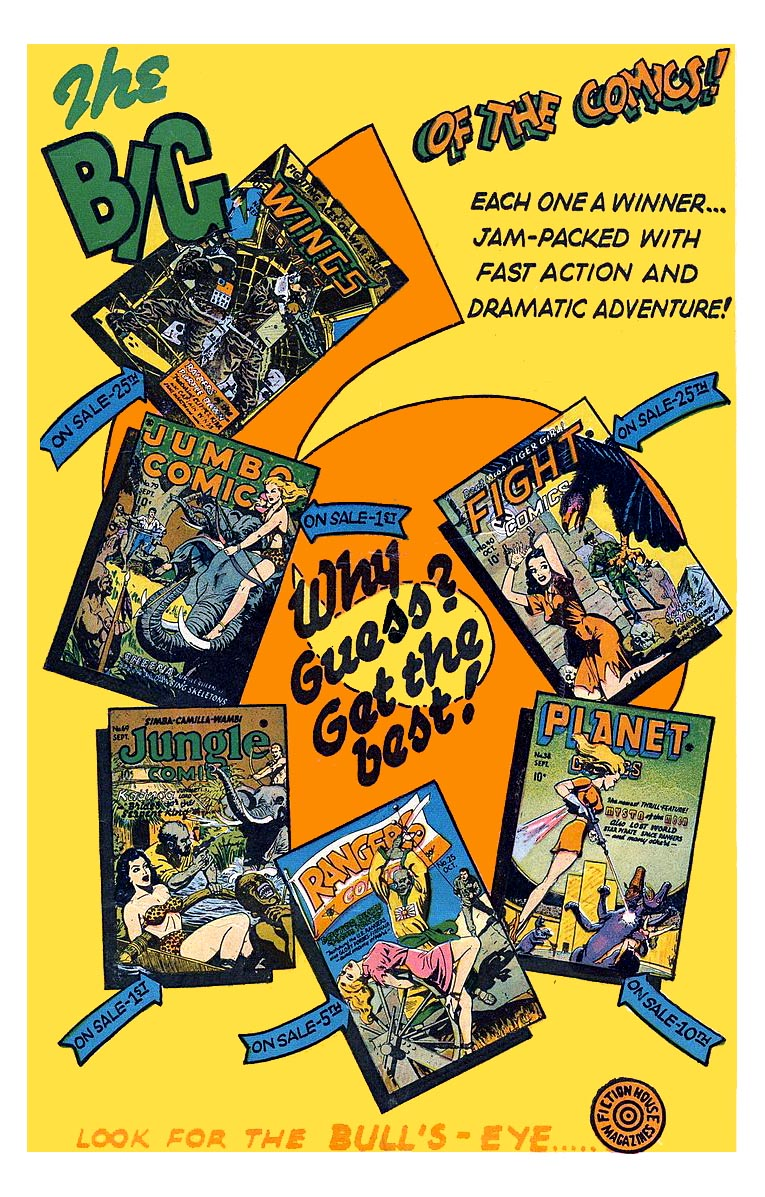
- House ad, Wings #61, 1945, Fiction House (defunct magazine and comics publisher)
- Publishers: Vertigo Comics; Marvel Comics' Max line; Metal Mammoth; NBM Publishing; Fantagraphics

The catch-all term adult comics typically denotes comic books, comic magazines, comic strips or graphic novels that are marketed either mainly or strictly towards adult (or mature) readers. This can be because they contain material that could be considered thematically inappropriate for children, including vulgarity, morally questionable actions, disturbing imagery, and sexually explicit material.

Adult comics can be defined as intended for audience of 16 years or older.

== English-speaking countries ==
=== Early days ===
Roger Sabin traces the history of adult comics back to the political cartoons published in broadsheets since the 19th century. In the 1930s, there were clandestinely produced tijuana bibles – rectangular, eight page pamphlets with black printing on cheap white paper.

Starting in 1932, Norman Pett drew a strip called Jane for the British Daily Mirror newspaper. The heroine would often find herself in awkward situations where she would lose her clothing for one reason or another. The strip was written to some extent for a military audience to boost the morale of troops away from home. Winston Churchill said that Jane was Britain's "secret weapon".

In the United States, pulp magazines such as Harry Donenfeld's Spicy Detective featured comics on heroines who lose their clothing, such as Adolphe Barreaux's Sally the Sleuth which debuted in 1934. Many of the early comic publishers got their start in the pulps with Donenfeld for instance going on to found DC Comics. Fiction House similarly started as a pulp magazine publisher, but in 1938, they released Jumbo Comics featuring Sheena, Queen of the Jungle, the first of many scantily clad jungle girls. Fiction House comics routinely featured attractive women on the covers, a trend which later became referred to as 'good girl art'. In 1941, Quality Comics put out Police Comics featuring Phantom Lady, a scantily clad crime fighter. Fox Feature Syndicate eventually began publishing Phantom Lady where she was drawn by Matt Baker. Milton Caniff started producing the comic strip Male Call in 1943, and Bill Ward came out with Torchy in 1944 featuring sexy heroines.

Pulp magazines were also known for their violence. The Shadow carried two guns for killing criminals, and Batman also wielded a gun from 1939 through 1944 before giving it up. Crime and horror comics were popular genres in the late 1940s and early 1950s with such titles as Lev Gleason Publications' Crime Does Not Pay, EC Comics' Crime SuspenStories, Tales From the Crypt and Vault of Horror all enjoying brief spells of interest. It is believed that EC had one of the best-selling lines at the time. Harvey Kurtzman was one of the key writers for EC, and artists such as Wally Wood or Al Williamson began to do research for each new story far beyond what had been seen in titles published up to that time.

In the 1950s Irving Klaw published a line of underground fetish and bondage comics by artists like Eric Stanton, John Willie, and Gene Bilbrew. These never achieved widespread popularity but were kept in print for many years, sold through Klaw's mail order catalog to the same customers who bought his bondage photographs of Bettie Page.

=== The Comics Code Authority ===
In 1954, a psychologist Dr. Fredric Wertham came out with a book Seduction of the Innocent that claimed that the rise in juvenile delinquency being reported in the news at the time was fueled by comic books. He claimed that Batman and Robin were encouraging homosexuality, and decried the bondage seen in Wonder Woman's comic book. EC Comics came under criticism for the graphic violence and gore seen in its crime and horror books. EC publisher William Gaines was called before a Senate committee to testify, but he remained defensive saying that he was already censoring the more extreme things from his books. Partly in order to avoid the government imposing a solution, the other major publishers banded together to form the Comics Code Authority which would screen comics before they went to press, and only allow the Code mark to appear if the comic passed their standards.

The Code was strict. It barred publishers from using the words 'crime', 'horror' or 'terror' in their titles, thus forcing EC to abandon some of their most popular titles. Police officers could not be portrayed in a negative light, and if a villain committed murder, he would have to be caught and punished by the end of the story. No mention was allowed of vampires, werewolves or zombies, another swipe at EC. Years later when Marvel introduced zombies into their books, they had to call them 'zuvembies' in order to pass the Code. In general, DC and Marvel were supportive of the Code, but EC struggled to cope with the new rules, and eventually abandoned most of their titles to focus on Mad magazine, which did not need Code approval.

=== Magazines and comic strips ===
North American comic books tend to be around 7 by 10 inches in size. Magazines vary, but are usually larger. Comic books tended to have a Comic Code label marking them as suitable for children, while magazines had no such requirement. This led to magazines becoming one of the most common formats for adult comics.

Playboy magazine first came out in 1953. It would feature single panel cartoons by artists such as Alberto Vargas, Archie Comics artist Dan DeCarlo, Plastic Man creator Jack Cole, LeRoy Neiman and later Olivia De Berardinis and Dean Yeagle.

In the mid-1960s, Playboy magazine started including a multipage strip called Little Annie Fanny by EC alumni Harvey Kurtzman and Will Elder with an occasional assist from artist Frank Frazetta. Annie had trouble keeping her clothes on, a trend seen also in the strips The Adventures of Phoebe Zeit-Geist, Wally Wood's Sally Forth, and Penthouse's Oh Wicked Wanda by Ron Embleton and Frederic Mullally. Penthouse would later put out a number of erotic comic magazines: Penthouse Comix, Penthouse Men's Adventure and Penthouse Max with the likes of Adam Hughes contributing artwork. Penthouse later revived the series as the bi-monthly series Penthouse Comics in 2024.

From 1965, Warren Publishing started publishing two black and white magazines, Creepy and Eerie, commissioning work from the artists who had worked on EC's horror line. Warren added Vampirella in 1969, and then the science fiction magazine titled 1984 (later 1994) starting in the year 1978.

The publishers of the American humor magazine National Lampoon discovered the French adult magazine Métal Hurlant, and in 1977 started publishing Heavy Metal translating the work of Milo Manara, Caza, Vittorio Giardino, Jean-Claude Forest, Jean Giraud and Guido Crepax for an English audience. Heavy Metal also provided a forum for the work of American creators such as Richard Corben and Howard Chaykin.

In 1974, Larry Flynt came out with Hustler magazine, which featured a strip called Honey Hooker with art originally by James McQuade and later by Tom Garst. Starting in the early 1970s, McQuade drew a series of erotic comic stories featuring the character Misty.

=== Underground comics ===
Adult comics continued underground in the late 1960s outside the umbrella of the CCA. The underground comics movement was spearheaded by creators such as Art Spiegelman, Robert Crumb, Harvey Pekar, Kim Deitch and Spain Rodriguez. Larry Welz appeared in the 1980s with his Cherry book, an underground-style erotic parody of Archie Comics.

=== Independent publishers ===
In 1966, Wally Wood hit upon the idea of publishing his own comic, and selling it through comic book specialty shops. Recruiting star creators from among his friends, witzend featured one-off strips on a wide variety of themes by the likes of Jack Kirby, Steve Ditko, Frank Frazetta, Gil Kane and Art Spiegelman.

Fantagraphics began in 1976, publishing the Comics Journal and later Amazing Heroes with text articles about the comics field, but they began publishing actual comics in 1982, notably Love and Rockets by Gilbert and Jaime Hernandez. In 1990, Fantagraphics established their Eros Comix imprint, reprinting titles by Wally Wood and Frank Thorne as well as Gilbert's Birdland.

Canadian Dave Sim began publishing Cerebus the Aardvark in 1977, and Wendy and Richard Pini put out Elfquest starting in 1978, initially through their own WaRP company. Pacific Comics was formed in 1981, and became the first publisher of Dave Stevens's Rocketeer which was eventually made into a film. Stevens modeled one of the characters on Bettie Page harkening back to an earlier era of clandestine publishing.

Antarctic Press was founded in 1984, and publishes American manga and independent creators, notably Terry Moore's Strangers in Paradise.

Dark Horse Comics was founded in 1986. Its first comic book was the adult-oriented anthology, Dark Horse Presents, which published Frank Miller's noirish Sin City, later made into a feature film.

Avatar Press began providing a showcase for the works of Alan Moore and Al Rio in 1996. Top Shelf Productions was formed in 1997, publishing Moore and Melinda Gebbie's Lost Girls erotic graphic novel.

=== Mainstream publishers ===
The publisher of Marvel Comics in the 1960s, Martin Goodman, was also the publisher for a number of men's adventure magazines: Men, Male and Stag. In these magazines, they included a strip called The Adventures of Pussycat drawn by Wally Wood and Bill Ward. These strips were eventually collected, and released as a one-shot magazine in 1968. Inside, it is listed as being printed by Marvel Comics, but there is no Marvel logo on the cover, nor any Comics Code mark.

Intrigued by Warren's success with their black and white titles, Marvel Comics tried their hand at this field as well, releasing Savage Tales starting in 1971, The Tomb of Dracula in 1972 and Savage Sword of Conan in 1974. In 1974, Marvel even released three issues of Comix Book under their Curtis imprint featuring the work of underground creators. Heavy Metal's success with glossy color science fiction and fantasy did not go unnoticed either, and in 1980, Marvel released their Epic Illustrated magazine as well as a number of adult themed graphic novels under the Epic label. By 1986 though, they had cancelled Epic Illustrated, although Savage Sword of Conan continued running until 1995.

By the 1980s, there was a growing trend towards grim and gritty anti-heroes and increasing violence in comics. Marvel Comics' Punisher received his own title in 1985, and in 1986, DC Comics' Watchmen by Alan Moore and The Dark Knight Returns by Frank Miller explored issues related to vigilantes.

In 1986, DC Comics started publishing comics with the words "For Mature Readers" or "Suggested for Mature Readers" on their covers. These mature readers titles included The Shadow (1986), The Question (from #8 1987-), Slash Maraud (1987-8), Swamp Thing (from #57 1987-), Vigilante (from #44 1987-8), Wasteland (1987-), Batman: The Killing Joke (1988), Green Arrow (#1-62 1988-92), Haywire (1988-9), Hellblazer (1988-), Tailgunner Jo (1988-9), V for Vendetta (1988-), Blackhawk (1989–90), Deadman: Love After Death (1989), Gilgamesh II (1989), The Sandman (1989-), Doom Patrol (1990-), Shade, the Changing Man (1990-), Twilight (1990), World Without End (1990-1), Mister E (1991), Animal Man (1992-), Deadman: Exorcism (1992) and Mighty Love (2004).

In 1993, DC started up their Vertigo imprint that allowed explicit content in selected titles, grouping a number of their mature readers titles together. Notable Vertigo titles include the Fables, 100 Bullets, Preacher and The Sandman as well as several books that have been adapted into feature films, such as Hellblazer, A History of Violence, Stardust and V for Vendetta.

In 2001, Marvel Comics withdrew from the Comics Code Authority, and set up their own content rating system, and an adult-oriented Max imprint. In 2011, DC withdrew from the Comics Code as well, and the sole remaining CCA member Archie Comics withdrew soon after, bringing the code to its end.

=== Erotic comics ===
Some adult comics are pornographic, focusing substantially on sexual activity, either for its own sake or as a major story element. As such they are usually not permitted to be legally sold to minors. Some examples grew out of the underground comix scene, such as Cherry by Larry Welz, which parodied Archie Comics. "Omaha" the Cat Dancer by Kate Worley and Reed Waller combined sexually explicit material with a melodrama featuring anthropomorphic animals. XXXenophile by Phil Foglio blended science fiction and fantasy scenarios with sexual situations.

Early comics produced for gay and bisexual male readers often focused on sexual situations, such as Kake by Tom of Finland and Harry Chess by Al Shapiro. Although gay comics have expanded to cover a variety of genres, erotica has continued to be popular sometimes incorporated into other genres, such as the erotic superheroes published by Class Comics, the wordless graphic novels written by Dale Lazarov, and yaoi hentai produced in Japan.

== Europe ==
The French comics anthology Pilote was published from 1959 to 1989, and featured the work of adult-oriented creators such as Jean Giraud, Guido Crepax, Caza and Robert Crumb. By 1974, Jean Giraud and some of his comrades had become dissatisfied with Pilote, and broke off to found the Métal Hurlant magazine to showcase adult comics in the science fiction or fantasy genres.

In France in 1962, Jean-Claude Forest started producing a strip called Barbarella, set in outer space, but where the heroine found herself losing her clothing or ending up in sexual situations.

In 1965, the Belgian artist Guy Peellaert released the first graphic novel, The Adventures of Jodelle. In Italy, Guido Crepax published Valentina in Linus magazine. In 1966, also in Italy, the artist Sandro Angiolini drew the first issue of Isabella. In 1968, Yves Duval and Dino Attanasio wrote and drew a sexy strip called Candida for the Belgian magazine Cine-Revue.

In England, in 1969, writer Jo Addams and artist Luis Roca published the Scarth A.D. 2195 strip in the newspaper The Sun. In 1972, Don Lawrence produced a strip Carrie for Mayfair magazine. In 1976, John Richardson drew the strip Amanda also for The Sun.

In 1977, the British anthology 2000 A.D. first appeared, and featured the work of many writers and artists, such as Alan Moore and Dave Gibbons (who later co-created Watchmen) and Neil Gaiman (who later wrote The Sandman). In 1978, artist Enrique Badía Romero and writer Donne Avenell have produced the strip Axa for The Sun.

In 1978, the Belgian company Casterman published the magazine À Suivre that featured many of the same contributors who were seen in Métal Hurlant. Catalan Communications and more recently NBM Publishing have also published adult works from Europe, mostly as standalone graphic novels, although NBM currently has an anthology magazine called Sizzle.

In 1979, the British magazine Viz first appeared parodying earlier British comics anthologies with an injection of incongruous sex or violence. In 1982, Raymond Briggs tried to give British comics a more serious tone with works such as When the Wind Blows about an older couple trying to come to terms with the aftermath of a nuclear attack.

== Japanese manga ==
In Japan, comic books (manga) intended for adults are usually divided into 'seinen manga' (comics for men) and 'josei manga' (comics for women). Erotic comics aimed at men are referred to as 'seijin-muke manga' or 'ero manga' and those aimed at women are called 'ladies comics'. Shōnen manga for boys tend to outsell seinen manga which in turn outsell seijin-muke manga.

Some of the first specialized manga magazines were aimed at adult men. Weekly Manga Times debuted in 1956, and originally focused on erotic fiction and 'porno manga'. Weekly Manga Goraku first came out in 1964, and was also aimed at the relatively older demographic of men from their 30s through to their 50s. Manga Action and Young Comic debuted in 1967, followed by Big Comic in 1968, with Weekly Young Jump following in 1979, and Weekly Young Magazine in 1980.

== Notable artists and writers ==
- Horacio Altuna
- Milton Caniff
- Philippe "Zep" Chappuis
- Howard Chaykin
- Richard Corben
- Molly Crabapple
- Guido Crepax
- Robert Crumb
- Kim Deitch
- Kevin Eastman
- Will Elder
- Frank Frazetta
- Neil Gaiman
- Melinda Gebbie
- Dave Gibbons
- Jean Giraud
- Gilbert Hernandez
- Jaime Hernandez
- Adam Hughes
- Ralf König
- Harvey Kurtzman
- Touko "Tom of Finland" Laaksonen
- Milo Manara
- Suehiro Maruo
- Frank Miller
- Alan Moore
- Al Rio
- Terry Moore
- Harvey Pekar
- Spain Rodriguez
- Paolo Eleuteri Serpieri
- Dave Sim
- Art Spiegelman
- Frank Thorne
- U-Jin
- Alberto Vargas
- Bastien Vivès
- Bill Ward
- Larry Welz
- John Willie
- Wally Wood
- Hiroki Yagami
- Toshiki Yui

== See also ==
- Dōjinshi
- Children's comics
- Photo comics
- Category:Publishers of adult comics
