= Sticky (comics) =

- Author: Dale Lazarov (writer/editor) & Steve MacIsaac (artist)
- Cover artist: Steve MacIsaac
- Genre: graphic novel, gay erotic comics, pantomime comics
- Publisher: Bruno Gmünder Verlag
- Publication date: April 30, 2006
- Publication place: United States
- Media type: Print (Hardcover)
- Pages: 80 p.
- ISBN: 3-86187-971-9
- OCLC: 181519660

Sticky is a book of gay erotic comics written by Dale Lazarov and drawn by Steve MacIsaac.

== Publication history ==
It was originally serialized in three issues by Eros Comics / Fantagraphics. The series was collected, with remastered color, better paper and production values, and a new framing sequence, as a hardcover published by Bruno Gmünder Verlag.

== Format ==
The book uses wordless sequential art to tell four stories about masculine gay men who find unexpected congeniality as well as sexual passion with each other. These stories are interleaved with a framing narrative of a gay couple whose intimacy is enhanced by the stories they read in their copy of the book. The illustration consists of line art with a limited monochromatic palette for each story. The framing sequences use full color. The hardcover collection of Sticky is 80 pages long, and was published by Bruno Gmünder Verlag (Berlin, Germany) in March 2006.

== Reception ==
In TimeOut Chicago, Jason Heidemann wrote, "Carnality and sweetness is the exactly the right combination that makes Sticky a real standout in the genre. Readers will find the material is both erotically charged and unabashedly romantic."
