= Tina Anderson =

American comics writer

- Area: Writer
- Pseudonym: Gynocrat
- Notable works: Only Words, Loud Snow, Games with Me, The Femitokon Series

Tina Anderson is an American comics writer. She creates gay comics and women's yaoi, or Boys' Love. Anderson coined the term "GloBL" to encourage fans of yaoi/BL to think about implications of a BL aesthetic outside of Japanese culture. Anderson has written graphic novels and short stories that are included in collections from various publishers such as Class Comics, Yaoi Press, Sin Factory, DramaQueen, and Iris Print. Anderson stated in a November 2010 interview that 2011 would be her final year writing homoerotic graphic novels. Collected episodes of Anderson's online science fiction serial Femitokon debuted in December 2020 as an original English-language light novel called Suffocation.

== Selected works ==
- Suffocation: The Femitokon Series Volume I
- Tactical Pursuits: The Femitokon Series Volume II
- Games With Me Omnibus graphic novel, (art by Lynsley Brito)
- Loud Snow graphic novel, art by Amelie Belcher
- Only Words graphic novel, art by Caroline Monaco
- Diplomatic Immunity art by Caroline Monaco
- Ungestellt featured in Lemon Law 2
- King's Masterpiece featured in Yaoi Hentai
- Closed Flower featured in Saihôshi the Guardian
- Snow Demon featured in Enslaved by the Dragon
- In Motion featured in When Worlds Collide
- Roulette featured in RUSH anthology from publisher DramaQueen
- Gadarene novel written with cb. Potts
