= Newsfield =

British magazine publisher

Newsfield Publications Ltd (also known as Newsfield) was a British magazine publisher during the 1980s and early 1990s.

Newsfield Publications Ltd was founded by Roger Kean, Franco Frey and Oliver Frey in 1983. Based in Ludlow, Shropshire, Newsfield published a number of popular computer game magazines from the mid-1980s to early 1990s. This line-up was later supplemented by a number of less successful magazines covering role-playing games, film, horror and youth culture. Faced with financial difficulties, the company went bankrupt towards the end of 1991. However, another magazine publisher, Europress, continued to publish Newsfield's flagship publications, Zzap!64 and Crash, for a further six months before the former was relaunched as Commodore Force and the latter sold to rival publisher EMAP and merged with Sinclair User.

Thalamus Ltd, Newsfield's sister company, was set up in 1985 to publish a number of computer games on various 8-bit and 16-bit platforms, with a slant towards the Commodore 64. Thalamus initially survived the demise of Newsfield before it too finally went bankrupt in 1993.

Roger Kean, Franco Frey and Oliver Frey operated Thalamus Publishing, an independent book publisher, until it closed in 2009.

With both Roger Kean and Oliver Frey working with Fusion Retro Books in the 2010s, the publisher negotiated with Future Publishing (who acquired the assets in the takeover of Imagine Publishing) to acquire all the trademarks and names of Newsfield. Since 2020, Fusion Retro Books has revived key titles including ZZAP!, Crash and Sega Mega Force.

== Magazines ==
=== Crash ===
Crash began life in 1983 as a software catalogue, offering reviews of games and a mail order service. The first issue of the dedicated monthly magazine was published in February 1984. Focusing exclusively on the ZX Spectrum, it was a lively, colourful magazine that soon attracted a considerable cult following. It remained in print, as a Newsfield publication, until October 1991. When Europress Impact took over publication of the magazine, it lasted for a further six months before finally being sold in 1992 to rival publisher EMAP and merged with Sinclair User. The May 1992 issue was the only merged issue published. Sinclair User ceased publication in 1993. In December 2020, Crash was relaunched as a bi-monthly publication by Fusion Retro Books. Consisting of reproductions of original covers from Oliver Frey, retrospective articles, new reviews and contributions from many of the original team.

=== Zzap!64 ===
Zzap!64 was launched in May, 1985 as the sister magazine to Crash. It focused on the C64, but later incorporated Amiga game news and reviews. Like Crash, it had a dedicated cult following amongst C64 owners, but extensive changes prompted a relaunch of the magazine, this time published by Europress Impact. Issue 91 of Zzap!64 would become issue 1 of Commodore Force, a magazine that itself lasted until March 1994.

Special issues in digital format were later made in March 2002 and July 2005, the latter celebrating the 20th anniversary of its creation and included with issue 18 of Retro Gamer. The title was revived for a series of annuals, and now continues in an A5 format, available bi-monthly via Patreon.

=== Amtix! ===
Amtix! was Newsfield's short-lived gaming magazine dedicated to the Amstrad CPC platform. Launched in November 1985 (although a special "issue zero" was given away with Crash and Zzap!64), it offered as much in-depth coverage of the Amstrad gaming scene as its sister magazines did for the Spectrum and C64. Amtix! was unable to compete with Amstrad Action, the leading publication for Amstrad CPC users; only 18 issues of Amtix! were published before Newsfield sold the magazine to Database Publications, who merged Amtix! features into their own publication, Computing With The Amstrad. CWTA was a general Amstrad CPC/PCW/PC magazine, which used Amtix as the brand for its games review section. CWTA later split into three single-format magazines including Computing with the Amstrad CPC, and it was CWTACPC which continued using the Amtix name for its games section.

=== LM ===
LM (variously said to be short for Leisure Magazine, Leisure Monthly, or Lloyd Mangram - a pseudonym used by editors in Newsfield's computer magazines) was launched in December 1986. It was a bold move for Newsfield, attempting to capture a youth market within the 18-30 demographic with a wide range of pop-culture coverage. The magazine failed to attract sufficient advertising revenue and was discontinued after four issues.

=== The Games Machine ===
The Games Machine launched in the autumn of 1987. It was Newsfield's first multi-format games magazine, intended to be a much more informative, serious rival to the popular Computer and Video Games publication. The first batch of issues attempted to broaden its appeal by featuring articles on non-gaming products, such as remote-controlled cars and high-tech gadgets, but it soon narrowed its focus to concentrate exclusively on games. The magazine continued for thirty-four issues before finally folding in 1990, having been consigned to the margins by Future Publishing's more robust ACE publication.

An Italian version of the magazine was launched around the same time, which initially translated much of the English version's content. It still continues to thrive today as one of Italy's best selling multi-format games magazines.

=== Fear ===
Fear ran between 1988 and 1991. It began life as a full-colour newsstand magazine edited by former deputy editor of Sinclair User John Gilbert. Newsfield, keen to find publishing ventures outside the volatile computer game market, agreed to publish Fear with Gilbert as managing editor. The first issue of the magazine, which would be dedicated to horror book/film reviews and original horror, fantasy and science fiction, was published in June 1988. Despite relatively low sales it managed to survive for the duration of Newsfield's business operations, seeing off rivals such as Skeleton Crew and Phantasmagoria, which entered the market midway through its run. Mark Kermode wrote several film reviews for the magazine. Fear reviews have been quoted on the back cover of books by authors including Peter F. Hamilton.

=== Movie ===
Newsfield's next venture was Movie - The Video Magazine. The market for commercial/sell-through pre-recorded VHS tapes was beginning to bloom and Newsfield decided it would be wise to try to capture a slice of this market. Launched in October 1988, Movie managed to attract the interest of advertisers within the video industry, but circulation of the magazine remained low and it failed to make a profit. It lasted for seven issues before Newsfield reluctantly discontinued publication.

=== Prepress ===
Prepress with the Macintosh was launched in September 1989, a trade magazine aimed at the publishing industry. It was well regarded within the industry but struggled to find sufficient advertising revenue until it later expanded to cover non-Macintosh platforms and was renamed simply Prepress. After Newsfield's closure it was sold to Hertford-based publisher Macro and survived until that firm in turn collapsed in 1993.

=== Complete Computer Entertainment Guide ===
With their financial resources running low, Newsfield attempted to launch a new computer magazine that would be produced by staff working for their existing titles. Launched in November 1989, it was intended to be a quarterly production, but the second issue wasn't published until November 1990. The magazine nevertheless continued to be published until Newsfield's demise in 1991.

=== Games Master International ===
In July 1990 Newsfield took over publication of Croftward Publishing's GM magazine. Aimed at fantasy role-playing gamers, GM had been a successful production with high circulation and strong advertising revenue. Unfortunately, as Newsfield relaunched it as Games Master International, the role-playing market was hit by a recession strong enough to force even Games Workshop's White Dwarf magazine to dip in sales.

=== Raze ===
Raze
- Editor: Richard Monteiro
- Categories: Video game magazines
- Frequency: Monthly
- First issue: November 1990
- Final issue Number: October 1991; 12
- Language: English
- ISSN: 0960-7706

With Newsfield's multi-format games magazine The Games Machine floundering, the publisher decided to rebrand it as Raze in October 1990 and move the editorial within the direction of the new Japanese games consoles, the Master System and Nintendo Entertainment System, which were growing in popularity. Once again, poor advertising revenue and an expensive out-of-house editorial team meant that the magazine failed to reap the profits Newsfield were hoping to see.

The editorial work for Raze was contracted out to Words Works Limited, which was headed by Richard Monteiro. The magazine itself was planned to be replaced after its initial 12-month run with two separate titles that would concentrate on the Sega and Nintendo consoles (Sega Force and Nintendo Force), however, those plans were put on hold when Newsfield entered liquidation in 1991. Content of Raze covered the 16-bit computer and console machines, with news on US and Japanese videogaming.

Roger Kean, co-owner of Newsfield Publications, granted the magazine preservation project, Out-of-Print Archive, permission to scan, edit and release the back issues of Raze.

Time Extension wrote about the magazine: "Raze magazine was a mess. It looks like every single section has been outsourced to a different person, and no one is talking to each other. Which means the tone, layout, and coverage switches wildly from page-to-page."

=== Frighteners ===
In an attempt to gain some much needed revenue, Newsfield decided to publish a spin-off of Fear magazine. Launched in June 1991, Frighteners was intended to be a monthly fiction magazine, showcasing up and coming new talent within the horror genre. The first issue had to be pulled from the shelves after receiving consumer complaints about the blood-dripping cover painted by Oliver Frey, which featured a story by novelist Graham Masterton. Only two more issues were printed.

=== Sega Force and N-Force ===
With their flagship titles, Crash and Zzap!64, no longer attracting sufficient advertising revenue or circulation, due to the fading 8-bit gaming market, Newsfield were in severe financial difficulty. As a last-ditch attempt to capitalise on the rising popularity of the new generation of video game consoles, Newsfield planned to split Raze into two separate publications, Sega Force and N-Force (the N standing for Nintendo). However, following an audit during the autumn of 1991, it became clear that Newsfield would no longer remain solvent beyond March 1992. The company's directors signed for voluntary liquidation in September 1991.
