= Drubskin =

American erotic illustrator, painter, and artist

- Born: August 14, 1973 (age 52); Derby, Connecticut
- Known for: Gay erotic art
- Website: drubskin.com

Drubskin, also known as "Drub" (born August 14, 1973; in Derby, Connecticut) is an erotic illustrator, painter, and artist known for his homoerotic fetish art and erotic comic book work. He is based in San Diego, California, and has ties to Skinheads Against Racial Prejudice and the punk subculture.

Drawing since the age of 15, Drub's illustrations incorporate various fetishistic interests including foot fetish, rubber, fisting, scat play, sado-masochism, and watersports. Most of the men he depicts are part of the punk, skinhead, and working class communities, drawn in a homo-masculine manner. His work is typically done in a comic book style, with bright colors and heavy line weight.

In 1991 he moved from Connecticut to Kansas City, Missouri to attend the Kansas City Art Institute where he eventually earned his Bachelor of Fine Arts in Illustration. In 1995 he was asked to write a first-hand account of his sexual exploits in the punk and skinhead scene for a webzine called Nightcharm, as a way to promote his art. His pseudonym Drub is derived from his writing style, as a play on the verb which means 'to beat or thrash.'

His website and column garnered him attention from the gay male community at large and by 2000 his work began appearing in gay magazines worldwide. Drub began exhibiting his work in the 2000s and in 2003 he had his first international solo art exhibition at Mr. B's in Amsterdam. Drub has also shown his work in galleries in Los Angeles, Toronto, Berlin, and Amsterdam, and participates annually in the Seattle Erotic Art Festival. He has had work published in several publications, including Freshmen, Instigator and Blue magazine. He sells hand-illustrated greeting cards for Mr. B in Amsterdam and Berlin, and The Leatherman in New York City.

== Features and published works ==
Below are some of Drubskin's features and published works. For a complete list, see Drubskin's website.

- Freshmen Magazine, 2002, illustration for story "Chemistry"
- Solanas Online – Issue 2, 2003, Drub Coloring Book
- Instigator Magazine – 2/15/04 – Featured Artist
- Blue Magazine, Issue 52 – 9/01/04 – Featured Artist
- Turnover, Malware, ed. AIDS Project Los Angeles: The Institute for Gay Men's Health, 2005, ISBN 0-9759225-4-8
- BuzzcockNYC Monthly Party, 8/31/06 – New York City, poster art
- Best Gay Erotica 2007, "The Welcome Back Fuck", ed. Richard Labonte, written by Dale Lazarov, 2007, ISBN 1-57344-260-7
- Hard To Swallow Comics #3, "Dem Bones", All Thumbs Press/Marginalized Publications, 2007, ISBN 978-0-9778011-2-1
- Best Erotic Comics 2009, "Dem Bones", ed. Greta Christina, Last Gasp, 2009, ISBN 0-86719-711-0

== Gallery shows ==
- Drubbish Show, Fluke Gallery, Kansas City, Missouri - May 31, 2002
- Drub(x)3 Art Exhibition – Mr. B, Amsterdam/Berlin - 4/12/03
- Seattle Erotic Art Festival – Consolidated Works, Seattle, WA - 1/30/04 to 2/1/04
- 5×5=25 – Galeria ARTopia, Albuquerque, NM - 7/31/04
- Seattle Erotic Art Festival (Invited Artist) – Consolidated Works, Seattle, WA - 4/16/05
- Seattle Erotic Art Festival (Featured Artist/Advertising) – Consolidated Works, Seattle, WA - 5/01/06
- Toonfetish – Antebellum Gallery, Los Angeles, CA - 6/30/07
- Seattle Erotic Art Festival (Invited Artist) - Seattle Center Exhibition Hall, Seattle, WA - 3/1/08
