= Meatmen =

Meatmen may refer to:

- The Meatmen, an American punk band
- Meatmen (comics), a comics anthology

== See also ==
- Butcher
