= Albert F. Case Jr. =

American software engineer

Albert F. Case Jr. (born March 2, 1955) is an American software engineer and one of the leaders in the development of computer-aided software engineering (CASE) technologies and system development methodologies.

== Biography ==
Case is a graduate of the State University of New York at Buffalo. He began his software development career in 1972 and worked in a variety of IT-related capacities, including director of Management Information Systems for Ryder System and co-founder of Maximus Systems, Inc., developers of the Maximus code generator. In 1982, Case joined start-up Nastec Corporation, a Southfield, Mich. based software development company. In 1989, Case left Nastec Corporation to join Gartner, Inc. (then GartnerGroup), the IT industry research and advisory firm, where he spent the next 13 years as a thought-leading industry analyst, speaker, writer and business executive. After 13 years, Case left Gartner to become an independent consulting executive and entrepreneur, with the goal of applying GST and "organizational engineering" in the laboratory of live businesses.

Case served as a board member for Sky Capital Holdings, a New York-based investment bank; interim president and CEO of DuoCash Corporation, a payment processing services company; and as chairman of the board of eNucleus, Inc (ENUI.OB) a technology-based business process outsourcing firm; and president and CEO of Turbodyne Technologies, Inc. (TRBD.OB).

As an entrepreneur, Case is a co-founder and managing director of firms including content/commerce management software providers InfoTollgate.com (hosted content/commerce management systems) and Turnpike Software, LLC, the content management software development company (with his partner Dr. N. Adam Rin, former Bachman CASE tool and Gartner alumnus). He is also publisher and co-founder of IT procurement advisor TechSpend, LLC (with Gartner alumnus Vinnie Mirchandani). He is also the Research Fellow and principal analyst with ES Research Group, Inc., which specializes in helping companies identify, select, implement and measure sales performance improvement programs.

== Work ==
Case of the leaders in the development of computer-aided software engineering (CASE) technologies and system development methodologies. He also was a major contributor to the Spectrum System Development Methodology, from John D. Toellner Associates, developing the Structured Analysis and Structured Design design tips.

=== Computer-Aided Software Engineering ===
Nastec Corporation both coined the acronym CASE and launched the DesignAid analysis and design tool and the LifeCycle Manager project configuration and management system. For six years, Case served as Nastec's Vice President for Professional Services and Product Management. Case, and his associate Vaughn Frick developed a second generation structured analysis and design technique based on the Yourdon/Demarco/Constantine Structured Analysis/Structured Design technique. Frick, while working with Case at Nastec Corporation on the development of the PC-based DesignAid product, was the first to specify and teach a comprehensive technique for transforming a structured analysis specification into a structured design.

The professional services division quickly became not only the largest component of Nastec Corporation, but also the largest provider of SA/SD education.

Case was among the most prolific public speakers on the subject of CASE during the 1980s, helping launch, among other events, the Computer-Aided Software Engineering Symposium as its keynote speaker for its first two years. Case toured the country, promoting the integration of upper CASE and lower CASE with pro-football great and code-generation pioneer Fran Tarkenton, founder of Tarkenton Software. When Tarkenton Software and Nastec Corporation agreed not to merge, Tarkenton teamed up with James Martin and merged Tarkenton Software into KnowledgeWare, a direct competitor to Nastec.

=== Principles of Computer Aided Software Engineering ===
Case, also author of the book Information Systems Development: Principles of Computer Aided Software Engineering (Prentice Hall, 1986), was also a lifelong student of general systems theory (GST) and fascinated by the application of structured analysis and design techniques to the design of entire business operations, not just the information technology subsystems.

At Gartner, Case quickly ascended the analyst ranks, going from the leading Software Engineering analyst to head of its business process reengineering practice - where he could spend full-time applying GST to business design, launching Gartner's e-Business Resource Center, its Vertical Industries practices and ultimately becoming the founder, group vice president and general manager of Gartner's TCO Software division. From there, Case became head of Gartner's IT benchmarking business and president of Gartner's eMetrix business performance management business. During his 13-year tenure at Gartner, Case launched dozens of product and service lines that accounted for over $100 million in revenue to Gartner.

=== Stamford Research ===
He had a consulting firm Stamford Research, LLC, with Arnold Kwong and Steve Vogel.
