= Brad Parker (artist) =

American comics artist

- Born: Bradley Parker; 1961 (age 64–65) Omaha, Nebraska
- Areas: Cartoonist, Penciller, Artist, Publisher
- Notable works: "Tales of the Ninja Warrior" "Surf Graphics"; Green Lantern: Fear Itself; Oh Boy!

Bradley Parker (born 1961, Omaha, Nebraska) is an American cartoonist and painter. His works have been shown at the Kona Oceanfront Gallery and the La Luz de Jesus Gallery in Los Angeles. Prior to his career as a painter, Parker was an illustrator in the film industry and a cartoonist, working for mainstream publishers such as DC, Marvel, and Chaos! Comics. He is also known for his LGBT-themed comics, sometimes published under the pen name Ace Moorcock.

== Early life ==
Parker was born in 1961 and raised in Southern California. He later attended the art program at UCLA, where he discovered his future career path as a cartoonist. Following his departure from UCLA, he began work as an illustrator.

== Illustration ==
Cover of Oh Boy! by Brad Parker

In the 1980s, Parker's work appeared in several early volumes of Meatmen, and was featured on the back covers and frontispieces. His comics were also included in Gay Comix. In 1988, some of his work was collected in Oh Boy!, a 96-page book published by Leyland Publications. His comics appeared in gay porn magazines, including ongoing series for Freshmen, titled "Junior Jock Jackoff Jizz Juice Journal" and "Ace's Adventures in the Year 2000". Working in the film industry, he designed the on-screen monster for the film Jeepers Creepers, and worked with Rob Zombie on a music video for Ozzy Osbourne.

In 1997, he produced full-color cover and interior art for Marvels: Code of Honor, a four-issue limited series written by Chuck Dixon for Marvel Comics. In 1998, he painted the art for DC Comics' Green Lantern: Fear Itself, a 96-page graphic novel written by Ron Marz. As an author, he has also collaborated on book projects with author SP Grogan, including Captain Crooked and Atomic Dreams at the Red Tiki Lounge. During the 1990s, he discovered the work of painter Robert Williams and the lowbrow art movement. Taking inspiration from this work, he began to apply his cartoonist skills to painting fine art pieces, and was eventually encouraged by a friend to hold his first art exhibition in Hollywood, California. In 2006, Parker later moved to Hawaii, where he focused on work inspired by Hawaiian tikis full-time. In 2012, he was one of the artists that featured in the seminal book Surf Graphics.

== Painting and souvenirs ==
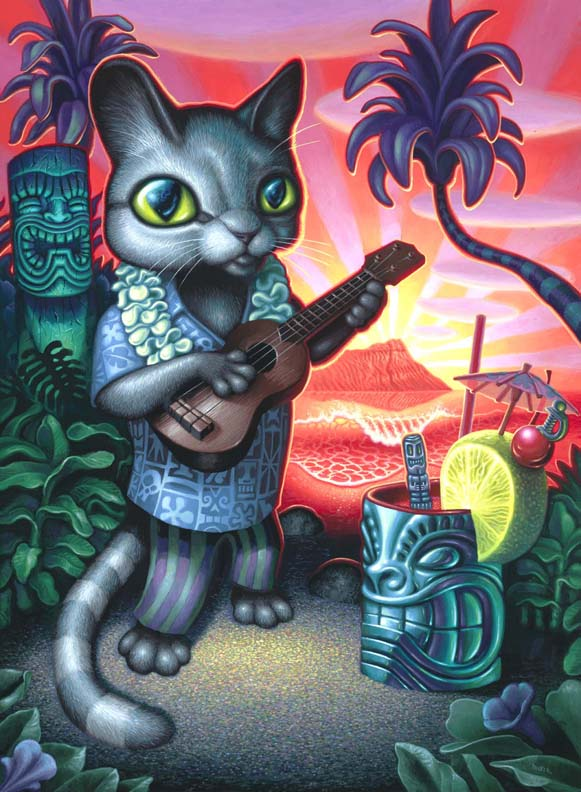
Tiki Cat

In Hawaii, Parker showed his works at the Kona Oceanfront Gallery in Kailua-Kona, where his pop surrealist paintings focusing on the Tiki theme were exhibited and sold. The art curators on the island were skeptical at first that his themes would sell, so he was first relegated to the back of the shop. As the paintings proved the better sellers of the art in the gallery, they eventually took on a featured position, including replacing the previous styles of paintings in the gallery window. His works blend popular culture items like Hollywood monsters, anthropomorphized house pets, and other alien elements into Tiki environments based upon Hawaiian landscapes. Parker states that he is making alternative representations of Tikis, and not producing the real thing, in order to avoid misrepresenting traditional Hawaiian indigenous culture.

His works are also exhibited and sold at galleries in Los Angeles, including collections sold in 2010, 2012, and 2014. In 2016, his collection was shown at the city's La Luz de Jesus Gallery. Parker's original paintings are sold at Hawaiian galleries, and are printed upon a range of souvenir merchandise sold on Hawaiian tourism locations and convenience stores. The items are developed through the company Tiki Shark Art Inc., which Parker co-founded with Abbas Hassan in 2010. In 2015, the company signed a licensing deal with McPhail Sports, a water sports and apparel company in New Zealand, to distribute Parker-themed merchandise to Australasia and Polynesia.

In 2016, Parker released a new series of works focusing on aquatic or jungle animals, and applied as tribal tattoos upon dish towels. These towels were created as a part of a kitchen accessories line sold under the brand of chef Sam Choy. Hana Hou! Magazine wrote of Parker's work: "His Polynesian pop cartoonland paintings draw from kitsch, elevating it to art."
