= Patrick Fillion =

Canadian illustrator and writer

- Born: 1973 (age 52–53) Quebec, Canada
- Area: Penciller • inker • writer
- Notable works: Camili-Cat; Naked Justice

Patrick Fillion (born 1973) is a Canadian illustrator and writer of comic books with erotic gay characters and themes.

Born in Quebec, Fillion drew comic book art and nudes from an early age, but when he moved to Vancouver in 1991 and became part of the gay community, his work went from mild to more explicit erotica. Over time, his style evolved to include more and more risqué subject matter that he developed into a line of self-published comics under the name Class Enterprises.

In 2004, Fillion and his partner Fraz created their own publishing company, Class Comics, through which they release a wider range gay-themed erotic comics.

The exposure of Fillion's characters in Montreal's Zip magazine led to a deal with "mega distributor" Bruno Gmünder, who has released art books featuring Fillion's work entitled Heroes, Mighty Males and Hot Chocolate. The Class Comics titles are translated into German by Gmünder, and into French by France-based publisher H&O Editions.

Fillion also continues to produce illustrations for several gay-themed publications, and has created artwork for numerous events and organizations.

== Characters ==
Fillion's erotic superhero characters (from left to right) Camili-Cat, Naked Justice and Ghostboy

Fillion's series characters are primarily young, muscled males with improbably large penises. Ethnically diverse, they find themselves in a plethora of dangerous and sexual situations, often involving equally sexualized aliens and supervillains. First appearing in Magma Forces #5 (1986), Camili-Cat is the last of an alien humanoid species that is part feline. "Cam's homeworld was destroyed when he was just a child. Now he roams the galaxy in the hopes of someday finding other survivors of his species." Naked Justice is a well-endowed superhero whose costume consists of only boots, long gloves and a mask. He first appeared in 2000's Ecstasy #1, and has appeared in two issues of his own series scripted by former Canadian Male magazine Editor-in-Chief Donald MacLean. Other characters include Deimos, a fallen Angel seeking absolution for his sins, and Ghostboy, who has the ability to dematerialize his molecules to phase through solid objects or become invisible.

== Class Enterprises (1992–2003) ==
- Affinity #1 (volume 1, 1992; volume 2, 1996)
- Affinity #2 (volume 1, 1992; volume 2, 1996)
- Affinity #3 (volume 1, 1992; volume 2, 1996)
- Affinity #4 (volume 1, 1992; volume 2, 1996)
- Affinity #0 (Special Limited Comic-Con 5 edition, 1996)
- Affinity #5-21 (volume 1, 1992 – 1995)
- Afterglow #1-2 (1997)
- Patrick Fillion's Camili-Cat Special Limited Edition #1 (1996)
- The Best of Camili-Cat #1 (1998)
- Camili-Cat: Purrfection #1 (First printing, 2000)

- Cube #1 (1995; Official series printing, 1998; Special Comic Con 5 Limited Ashcan Edition, 1996; Special Comic Con 6 Collector's Edition, 1997)
- Cube #2 (First printing, 1996; Official series printing, 1998; Diablo-Ghost Boy Nude cover Edition, 1998)
- Cube #3(1996; Jon Dazy cover, Official series printing, 1998; Battle cover, Official series printing, 1998)
- Cube #4 (1996; Jon Dazy portrait back cover, Official series printing, 1998; Diablo portrait back cover, Official series printing, 1998)
- Cube #5 (Limited edition gallery issue, 1996)
- Cube #6 (Special Comic Con 7 edition with colour cover, 1996; Limited Black and White cover Edition, 1997)
- Cube #7 (Limited Black and White cover Edition, 1997)
- Ecstasy #1 – (Diablo Cover, 2000; Naked Justice Cover, 2000)
- Naked Justice #1 (2002)
- Satisfaction Guaranteed #1 (1998; Expanded edition, 2004)
- Satisfaction Guaranteed #2 (1999)

== Class Comics (2003–) ==
- Boytoons: The Men of Patrick Fillion #1 (2003)
- Boytoons: The Men of Patrick Fillion #2-3 (2004)
- Camili-Cat: Felinoids #1 (2003)
- Camili-Cat: Felinoids #2 (2004)
- Camili-Cat: Felinoids #2 Website Exclusive (2004)
- Camili-Cat: Purrfection #1 (2004)
- Camili-Cat: 20th Anniversary (2006)

- Deimos #0 (2004)
- Guardians of the Cube #1–4 (2004)
- Naked Justice #1 (2003)
- Naked Justice #2 (2004)
- Rapture #1 (2005)
- Satisfaction Guaranteed #1 Expanded Edition (2004)
- Satisfaction Guaranteed #2–3 (2004)

== Translated By H&O Editions (France) ==
- Boytoons (Hardcover) (2004)
- Camili-Cat #1 (2003)
- Camili-Cat #2 (2004)
- Camili-Cat #3 (2004)
- Guardians of the Cube (Trade paperback, containing Cube #1–4)

- Naked Justice #1 (2003)
- Naked Justice #2 (2004)
- Satisfaction Guaranteed #1 (2004)
- Satisfaction Guaranteed #2 (4th printing, 2004)

== Bruno Gmünder (Germany) ==
- Heroes (Artbook, 2005)
- Hot Chocolate (Artbook, 2005)
- Mighty Males (English, 2005)
- Mighty Males (German, 2005)
- iLUSTrations: the Art of Patrick Fillion (Artbook, 2010)

Castle Rain Entertainment

- Jestercrow #2 (Cover illustration, 2001)

== Mermaid and Avatar Press ==
Mermaid

- GoGo Boy #3 ( Backup 5-page story called "Mermaid Tales" and back cover, 1995)

Avatar

Fillion illustrated a great deal of work for Avatar Press in 2000, 2001 and 2002, some of which has yet to be printed. The items listed below are the items which have been released to date.

- Avengelyne: Dark Depths #1/2 (Cover, 2001)
- Avengelyne: Seraphicide #1/2 (Pax Romana Edition: Cover, 2002)
- Hellina #0 (Variant cover, 2003)
- Razor: Till I bleed Daylight #1 (Cover art, 2000)
- Razor: Bleeding Heart #1 (Inside art, regular cover, 6 variant covers, 2001)
- Threshold #26 (Lookers short story part 1 ) – 2000
- Threshold #27 (Lookers short story part 1 ) – 2000
- Threshold #37 (Adult and regular covers, "The Lookers: the Shaft of Dionysus" Part 1, 2000)
- Threshold #38 (Adult and regular covers, "The Lookers: the Shaft of Dionysus" Part 2, 2000)
- Twilight Raw #1 (Covers and additional inside art, 2000)
- Twilight Raw #2 (Covers and additional inside art, 2000)

== Magazines ==
- All-Man Magazine (Various monthly illustrations, 2002–2004)
- Black Inches magazine (Various monthly illustrations, 2002 – present)
- Latin Inches magazine (Various monthly illustrations, 2002–present)
- Handjobs magazine – (Short story illustrations, January 2002)
- Freshmen magazine (Various monthly illustrations, 2005–present)
- Inches magazine (Various monthly illustrations, 2006–present)
- Torso magazine (Various monthly illustrations, 2006–present)
- Zip magazine - April/May 1999 (French version of "Camili-Cat: Auto Pilot")
- Zip magazine - June/July 1999 (French version of "Camili-Cat: Poor Kitty Cat")
- Zip magazine - Aug/Sept 1999 (French version of "Camili-Cat: Reunion")
- Zip magazine - Oct/Nov 1999 (French version of "Camili-Cat: the Djinns")
- Zip magazine - Winter 1999 (Cover illustration - Interview with Patrick Fillion)
- Zip magazine - Winter 2000 (Cover illustration - French version of "Naked Justice")
- Zip magazine - Winter 2001 (Cover illustration – Patrick Fillion art gallery)
- Zip magazine - Spring 2001 (French version of "Dane and the Leathermen")
- Zip magazine - Fall 2001 (French version of "Naked Justice: Orgy of the Damned")
- Zip magazine - Winter 2002 (Interview with Patrick Fillion – Art Gallery)

== Anthologies ==
- Meatmen #25 ("Camili-Cat vs. the Djinns," 10-page short story, 2002); Leyland Publications
- What's Wrong (Cover illustration and 4 Camili-Cat strips, 2002); Arsenal Pulp Press

== Calendars ==
- Hot Chocolate - 2007 Calendar
