= John Blackburn (cartoonist) =

American cartoonist

- Born: John Blackburn; September 10, 1939 Statesboro, Georgia
- Died: April 7, 2006 (aged 66)
- Area: Cartoonist
- Notable works: Coley Running Wild

John Blackburn (September 10, 1939 – April 7, 2006) was an American erotic artist and cartoonist, specializing in bisexual erotic comics during the 1990s. His comics were noted for "their straightforward explorations of psychological elements behind the physical connections" and "focused on unbridled sexual ecstasy and gay sex as a joyous activity".

== Career ==
John Blackburn was born in Statesboro, Georgia in 1939. He attended art school in Nashville, Tennessee. After graduation from college he settled in Atlanta. In the 1960s he relocated to Los Angeles.

Blackburn drew illustrations for Physique Pictorial, Physique Art Quarterly, One, In Touch, FirstHand, ManTalk, Manscape, and Guys magazines.

Cover of Coley Running Wild: Destiny Coast, featuring Blackburn's character Coley Cochran

He self-published four books starring his signature character Coley from 1989 to 1991: Coley on Voodoo Island, Wild in the Street, Breathless, and Return to Voodoo Island. Coley Cochran was a muscular, blonde-maned 19-year-old who is kidnapped and undergoes a rite which makes him an un-ageing "voodoo sex god", narcissistic and able to seduce anyone around him, male or female. Eros Comix reprinted Return to Voodoo Island and published several subsequent limited series, followed by four large-format volumes in their Graphic Albums series, under the title Coley Running Wild:

1. The Blade and the Whip – collecting Return to Voodoo Island and Idol of Flesh
2. Caged Heat – collecting Web of Evil and The Deathsnake
3. Hard Throb – collecting Hard Throb and Dagger of Blood
4. Destiny Coast – original full-length story

Additional short stories about Coley (and another character Jonny Shadow) were featured in volumes 15 through 25 of Meatmen.

== Death ==
Blackburn died unexpectedly on April 7, 2006 "following a brief illness".
