= Belasco (cartoonist) =

African-American cartoonist

- Area: Cartoonist
- Notable works: The Brothers of New Essex; Boo and the Bruthas

Belasco is an African-American cartoonist, known for his erotic comics, illustrations, and animations featuring muscular African-American gay men.

== Career ==
Cover of The Brothers of New Essex by Belasco

Belasco began producing homoerotic art in 1991, while living in Chicago, and published in small-press magazines such as Thing, Kick, and JFY magazine. He then created the covers for the first few B-Boys Blues books by James Earl Hardy. Meanwhile, he began self-publishing erotic comic books, and produced regular erotic strips for GBM magazine. It was in these comics that he introduced his signature character Boo: a muscular, sexually dominant, gay African-American construction worker in the tradition of Tom of Finland's work.

His work has been featured in the Meatmen series of books of gay erotic comics. His short story "Punks: Featuring a Bruh Named Boo" was included in Last Gasp's Best Erotic Comics 2008, and "Th' Flood Gates" was included in Best Erotic Comics 2009. His work has been commissioned by the Black Wrestling Network, featuring original artwork based on existing wrestlers and fantasy wrestling matches between celebrities.

In 2000, Cleis Press published The Brothers of New Essex, a 200-page collection of his comics. This was followed in 2011 by Boo and the Bruthas from Magnus Books.

He has been a featured artist at the Tom of Finland Erotic Art Fair, and designed a logo for the Rukus! Black LGBT Archive. His work is included in the archives of The Center for Sex and Culture, hosted by the University of Southern California.

== Personal life ==
Belasco lives in Los Angeles.
