= Oglaf =

Sexually explicit comedy webcomic

- The warning page which appears to first-time readers, who must state they are over 18 to proceed
- Author(s): Trudy Cooper and Doug Bayne
- Website: www.oglaf.com
- Launch date: 2008

Oglaf is a sexually explicit comedy webcomic produced by Australians Trudy Cooper and Doug Bayne.

== Authors and publication ==
Oglaf is produced by Trudy Cooper and Doug Bayne, though this is not stated anywhere on the comic's website; reviewer Shaenon Garrity said in 2012 that the comic was "technically anonymous but instantly recognizable" as the work of Cooper and Bayne.

A 2013 Sequential Tart article said that "the site... doesn't tell who creates it", while a 2016 Paste Magazine article credited the comic to "Bodil Bodilson". In 2025 The Comics Journal interviewed Cooper and Bayne as the authors of Oglaf, with them attributing this ambiguity to themselves being bad at self-promotion.

The Patreon page for Oglaf states that the comic is made by "Trudy & Doug" and the printed books are credited to them.

Cooper and Bayne had previously worked together on Platinum Grit and had also animated a music video together for Violent Soho.

According to the website, the comic "started out as an attempt to make pornography [and] degenerated into sex comedy pretty much immediately." A new comic is released online each Sunday. The first two collections have been published in book form by TopatoCo, and a third book was crowdfunded on Kickstarter in July and August 2020. A fourth book was crowdfunded in September 2023.

== Setting and style ==
The comic takes place in a medieval fantasy realm; a reviewer for ComicsAlliance described it as "a world created by shoving every existing fantasy world into a blender and setting it on puree." Oglaf has no overarching story, though does have many recurring characters and storylines.

It features many explicit sex scenes; reviewers have called it "really REALLY pornographic" and "extremely, extraordinarily NSFW." The initial story is about a man named Ivan who is apprenticed to a sadistic sorceress who forbids him to masturbate, or else his ejaculations come to life and report him. Comics have included shapeshifters, interspecies romance, fountains of youth, enchanted body parts, magical sex toys, and "bedroom injuries with a literal ice queen". The archive notes which comics are less explicit.

Cooper has noted that many of the early Oglaf strips have material that "we'd never do now", due to issues regarding sexual consent.

== Reception ==
Inverse praised Oglaf for its depictions of gender and sexuality and The Escapist noted its inclusion of people of colour and LGBTQ+ characters. Oglaf won a Silver Ledger from 2016 Ledger Awards, which acknowledge excellence in Australian comic art and publishing. In 2013, it was called the Best X-Rated Strip by NJ.com. It was rated #1 in the Romance and Erotica category by ComicsAlliance for 2016. Oglaf.com was named one of the top porn sites for women by Cosmopolitan in 2017.

A reviewer for ComicsAlliance called Oglaf "some of the funniest smut on the web" and said, "imagine the funniest geek you know tried really hard to write magical porn, but they couldn't stop it from being laugh out loud funny. That's Oglaf...as dirty as it is, [it] somehow manages to be one of the lightest and most upbeat comics filled with sex that you're ever likely to find."

A reviewer for io9 said, "It's the webcomic that unleashes the full, perverted potential of the high fantasy genre – the perfect comic for anyone who likes their dick jokes with a side of swords and sexually frustrating sorcery" and also said it deserved to be nominated for an Eisner Award. Paste Magazine included it in an article on "40 of the Best Webcomics" in 2016, saying "If only all porn was as funny as Oglaf, the comic that made you laugh until you cried". Writing on Comic Book Resources, author Tim Seeley said that Oglaf "seems just as content making weird political jokes as it is making dick jokes. In addition to being smartly written, it's beautifully illustrated, and portrays a variety of sexualities and kinks, which ought to please any kind of pervert."
