= Vaughn Frick =

American alternative cartoonist

Carl Vaughn Frick – often credited as Vaughn Frick or simply Vaughn – is an alternative cartoonist known for the exploration of gay, environmental, HIV/AIDS awareness, and radical political themes in his comics. His Watch Out! Comix #1 (1986) was an influential gay-themed comic, one of the first by an openly gay male cartoonist. His work was also included in issues of Gay Comix, Meatmen, Strip AIDS, No Straight Lines, and So Fey, a collection of Radical Faerie fiction.

== Personal life ==
Vaughn is primarily known for being outspoken in his works, often focusing on activism within various communities. Although he is primarily associated with the romance and erotica genre due to his works within queer publications, Vaughn is also versed in writing for the sci-fi, horror, and supernatural genres.

It is known that Vaughn pursued acting as a career in the 1980s while simultaneously writing for Gay Comix #3. It is also known that he worked as an art director for San Francisco Sentinel, a job position which was acquired after designing for the Northwest Passage, the Seattle Sun, and Seattle Gay News, and worked as a cover artist, designer, and photographer for the Seattle Gay News. Vaughn is also known for his design work in Earth First! Journal and The Portland Alliance.

His personal blog, Radical Faerie Church, is Vaughn's blogspace primarily dedicated to posting panels of NOMEANSYES, one of Vaughn's comics that centers around gay activism by satirically tackling problems associated with homophobia. Vaughn also posts updates of his own personal thoughts here, sometimes about events or publications that mention him and his general reactions. Interviews and Q&As of him can also be found here.

== Notable contributions ==
=== No Straight Lines ===
One of Vaughn's most prominent works within activism includes the creation of "Watch Out!", a comic that served as a reaction to the general HIV/AIDS pandemic that began in 1983, which paralleled similar views from other authors such as David Wojnarowicz and Jaime Cortez. The comic depicts a man named Doug being coerced by his friend to explore a queer bar. After a moment of skepticism Doug agrees to enter, but is then sexually assaulted by various men. It is revealed this occurred because Doug happened to be wearing a specific color that codes him as a willing participant in their sex acts, before waking up and expressing relief at having had a bad dream. Vaughn's aim while creating the comic was to take a sardonic approach in addressing the unrealistic fears associated with queer underground BDSM culture, mainly those of straight men who fear gay men are predatory in nature. The comic was especially relevant to the HIV/AIDS crisis that ensued homophobic sentiments at the time.

=== Gay Comix ===
Vaughn features in issues #3, #4, #5, #7, #8, #13, #14, #15, #22, and #25. The following are some of his most notable features within Gay Comix. Gay Comix #4 includes some of Vaughn's most notable work. It features Stan stone, a comic related to HIV/AIDs was posted in this publication. Also notable was that Vaughn was responsible for producing the cover illustration for Gay Comix #4, sparking the beginning of his work in publication that would later become relevant in his work for Drummer.

Gay Comix #25 provides a brief overview of Vaughn Frick under the History of Contributors section. Mentioned are his works within Gay Comix #3, #4, #5, #7, #8, #13, #14, #15, #22, and #25, and related works included in Meatmen, Strip AIDS USA, Annie Sprinkled Is Miss Timed, RFD, and PDXS. A nod is also given to his activist work related to environmentalism in “Cascadia,” a strip created for Earth First! Journal and The Portland Alliance.

=== Drummer ===
Vaughn was responsible for the production of 1982's volume 5, issue 50, and volume 6, issue 51, 52, and 54. Drummer was a publication magazine that published both erotic and non-erotic fanfiction, photography, cartoons, comics, calendars, dramas, scripts, poems, and interviews. Other non-erotic content includes lifestyle articles, letters, reviews of other leather organizations, personal accounts, new columns, and editorials. Drummer would be the second publication of Vaughn's career in which he was responsible for production work (the first being Gay Comix #25).

=== Meatmen: An Anthology of Gay Male Comics ===
A collection of comics featuring gay erotica and humor published between 1986 and 2004. Vaughn was a featured creator during the time the publication received criticism for being too obscene, leading to the Little Sisters book and Art Emporium v. Canada case.

=== Special Righteousness Committee ===
Throughout the 1980s and 1990s, Oregon's primary anti-gay organization was known as the "Oregon Citizen's Alliance." In response to the organization's growing demands to implement doctrine into the constitution that would rule homosexuality as equal to necrophilia and pedophilia, as well as tactics of recruiting members through religious extremism and fear-mongering with a basis on the HIV/AIDS pandemic, "Marvelous" Marvin Moore (a friend of Vaughn's), founded the Special Righteousness Committee. The committee's message argued that the Oregon's Citizen's Alliance did not properly follow Old Testament Leviticus law, pointing out how it is a sin for the members to eat oysters, wear mixed fabrics, etc. Vaughn was one of the members that engaged in protesting, held media events for the committee, and helped publish statements in the state's voter political guide. Mainly, Vaughn contributed to the group's "Bible Tract," or informational political cartoon panels. His activism within the Special Righteousness Committee would later influence much of the religious critique found in comics such as "Watch Out!"

=== Stan Stone ===
Stan Stone is a story loosely based on Vaughn's friend and artistic partner Stan Henry. Initially, a caricature of Stan was featured in "Watch Out!", which received good reception, and Vaughn gradually continued to feature Stan within other comics until Stan Stone was eventually created with him as the main character. Stan became a fan favorite character, with Stan Henry later expressing his love for the comic and collaborating with Vaughn in the writing process. Vaughn states his popularity with Stan Stone was unexpected, but deeply impactful to both his professional and personal life:

"I was 21 and in San Francisco when I drew this, living too close to the edge as an underground comix cartoonist. To quote Oscar Wilde 'I might be laying in a gutter, but I'm looking up at the stars.' I survived as an editorial cartoonist, graphic artist, and lay-out artist: before the digital age, the lay-out production crew would set up a page to be printed by assembling the components, to physically glue strips of photographed images and copy onto master pages that would be etched onto metal printing plates. I was renting a cockroach ridden studio apartment on Polk St. when I drew this . . . I had more idealism than good sense, and am amazed to be still alive today."

=== PDXS ===
An Oregon-based radical music and politics newspaper which Vaughn contributed to from 1992 until 1998. He produced the comic strip series "Portland Bird" as well as other full page comics, along with cover illustrations for the publication. Some of his earliest LGBTQ+ activism can be found in PDXS, such as on the cover illustration of volume 4, issue 14 which depicts three of "Oregon's Citizen Alliance," groups (anti-gay activism groups) as chickens ruled over by evangelist and homophobe Billy Graham.

=== Wolf Creek Radical Faerie Sanctuary ===
Wolf Creek Radical Faerie Sanctuary was a passion project which Vaughn was dedicated to in the 1980s, contributing to the purchase of land in southern Oregon in an area that historically had various radical gay communities. Radical Faerie sanctuary was a place where gay men could feel free to come together, support one another during the HIV/AIDS pandemic, and network. Although the sanctuary was initially non-profit, had a non-hierarchal leadership structure, and had consensus political policies set in place, Vaughn stated "Over time a few bad apples through a series of membership purges and targeted attacks took over and rewrote the vision, history, and sanctuary. And thus was it gentrified. Today that Wolf Creek Radical Faerie Sanctuary remains a battle zone which chews up and spits out new generations of those set to leave their mark upon those bleeding, embattled hills." He claims the majority of the comic characters on his blog, Radical Faerie Comic Church, are purely fictitious and "in no way could even live up to the actual happenings at Wolf Creek Radical Faerie Sanctuary."

== Awards and nominations ==
2013 Eisner Nomination of Best Anthology for No Straight Lines

25th Lambda Literary Award for No Straight Lines

== Bibliography ==
=== Comics ===
A list of comics, as well as comic books and publications Vaughn is featured in:

- “Watch Out!", Writer and Artist, No Straight Lines, 1982
- “The Tortoise and the Scorpion," Writer and Artist, No Straight Lines, 1982
- “Gay Comix #3”, Featured, Kitchen Sink Comix, 1982
- “Gay Comix #4”, Cover Illustration, Kitchen Sink Comix, 1982
- “Gay Comix #5”, Featured, Kitchen Sink Comix, 1982
- “Gay Comix #7”, Featured, Kitchen Sink Comix, 1982
- “Gay Comix #8”, Featured, Kitchen Sink Comix, 1982
- “Gay Comix #13”, Featured, Kitchen Sink Comix, 1982
- “Gay Comix #14”, Featured, Kitchen Sink Comix, 1982
- “Gay Comix #15”, Featured, Kitchen Sink Comix, 1982
- “Gay Comix #22”, Featured, Kitchen Sink Comix, 1982
- “Gay Comix #25”, Featured, Kitchen Sink Comix, 1982
- "Attracting Opposites," Writer and Artist, So Fey: Queer Fairy Fiction (Haworth Press), 2007
- "Annie Sprinkle In The Adventures of Miss Timed", Creator, Richard Kasak Books
- "Leatherthing," Writer and Artist, Gay Comix #4, 1989
- "Portland Bird," Writer and Artist, PDXS, 1992
- "Stan Stone," Writer and Artist, Kitchen Sink Comix, 1984
- "Danny and Clyde in the Flesh," Writer and Artist, Seattle Gay News, 1980's
- NOMEANSYES
- Meatmen (comics)
- Special Righteousness Committee
- Seattle Gay News, Photographer, designer, and cover artist, 1988
- No Straight Lines
- "Our Love Was Too Cosmic," Writer and Artist, Gay Comix #13, 1988
- Strip AIDS USA

=== Publications ===
A list of non-comic related publications Vaughn directly contributed to:

- Internet Speculative Fiction Database
- Earth First! Journal
- The Portland Alliance
- "Radical Environmental Journals," Designer, Environment and Society Portal.
- RFD (magazine)
- PDXS, Cartoonist and Cover illustrator, 1992
- The Seattle Sun
- Northwest Passage
- San Francisco Sentinel, Art director, 1980's
- Manifest Magazine
