= Steve MacIsaac =

Canadian comic artist

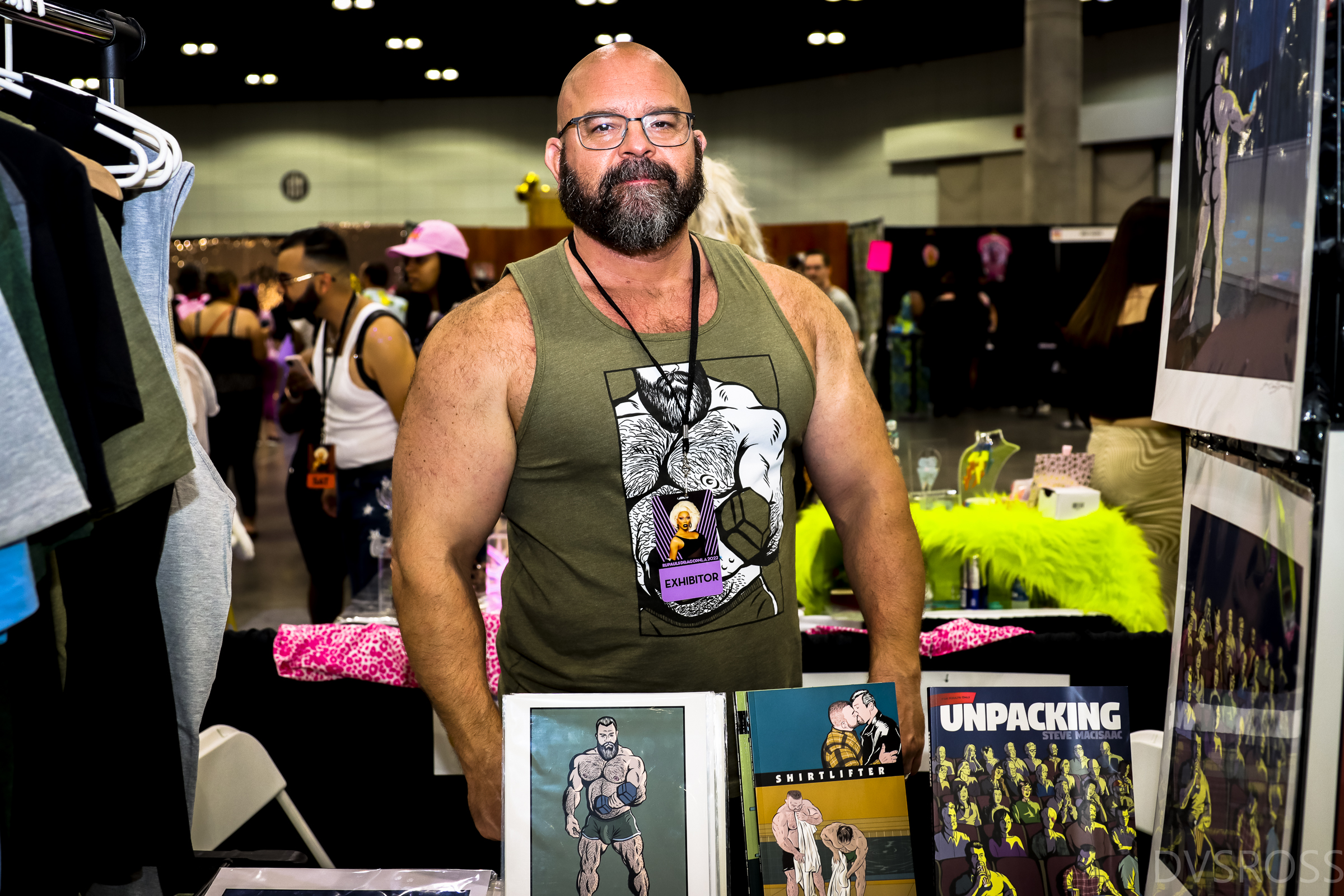
- Canadian comics artist Steve MacIsaac at RuPaul's DragCon LA 2022
- Born: October 21, 1969 (age 57) Antigonish, Nova Scotia
- Areas: Cartoonist, Writer, Artist
- Notable works: Shirtlifter, Unpacking, Sticky,

Steve MacIsaac is a Canadian comics artist and creator living in Long Beach, California. He is known for his comics series Shirtlifter (2006-2019) and the graphic novel, Unpacking (2018). His comics focus on the lives and relationships of contemporary gay men, from marriage to casual encounters. His work has been collected in “Best American Comics”, and other anthologies.

== Career ==
Early in his comics career, MacIssac published gay male erotica. In 2006, he collaborated with writer Dale Lazarov on Sticky, a wordless graphic novel focusing on the sex lives of gay men. However, since 2006, he has focused on his series about gay men's relationships and experiences in the early twenty-first century, Shirtlifter (vols. 1 - 6). Shirtlifter is an anthology series in which MacIsaac has focused on creating short stories and serializing long-form comics work, such as his graphic novel, Unpacking.

MacIsaac's comics explore the varied facets of gay men's lives and experiences in modern life, including sex and sexuality. MacIsaac has said that he is less focused on arousing desire, but more "interested in how sex defines people, how it can be a sublime way of revealing character and motivation. People let their guard down when you sleep with them; you often get to know them in a way that doesn’t happen when you’re simply friends. I think that’s one reason why, for gay men, sex is so often a path to or conduit for building friendships.”

MacIsaac's work has been honored by comics and literary professionals. His short story, "Ex-Communication" (with Todd Brower) was selected for inclusion in Best American Comics 2010 and his graphic novel, Unpacking, was a nominee for the 2019 Lambda Literary Graphic Novel Award. MacIsaac won the inaugural Queer Press Grant for LGBTQ comics creators from Prism Comics and a 2007 Xeric Foundation grant. His work has been collected in anthologies such as No Straight Lines, QU33R, Alphabet (with Todd Brower), Stripped, Boy Trouble, Blocked, and “Best Erotic Comics 2009.
