= Platinum Grit =

Australian comic book

- Author(s): Trudy Cooper, Danny Murphy and Doug Bayne
- Website: Platinum Grit official website (archived)
- Launch date: 1993/1994 (print), 2000 (web)
- End date: 2010 (indefinite hiatus)

Platinum Grit is an Australian self-published comic book/online comic. The series is noted for highly sexualised drawings of women, surreal offbeat humor and tightly written scripts. The series was created by writer/illustrator Trudy Cooper and co-writer Danny Murphy. Doug Bayne inked and contributed to the script up until episode 12.

== History ==
Jeremy and Nils, the main characters of Platinum Grit, first appeared in a story called "Friendly Rivalry" in volume 1, Number 7 of Australia's Issue One Magazine in Winter 1993. The Platinum Grit comic book was published from early 1994 through issue 10 (1998) by Dead Numbat Productions.

The creators of Platinum Grit were recipients of the 2005 Ledger Awards for Writer of the Year, Artist of the Year, and Webcomic of the Year. In 2006, Cooper won the Ledger for Writer of the Year. Platinum Grit has attracted critical acclaim from within the Australian comic industry.

In 2009, Image Comics imprint ShadowLine will commence reprints of the Platinum Grit graphic novels.

The comic has been on hiatus since 2010, with plans to return it to a new site and different format. In February 2020, the official website was taken offline.

== Creators ==
Trudy Cooper is a writer/illustrator who has been drawing the main characters in various forms since she was a young girl. She also contributed storyboards to the film Dark City, and draws and co-authors the webcomic Oglaf.

Danny Murphy is an actor, writer and singer on the Australian stage circuit.

== Influences ==
Cooper's influences include Phil Foglio, Edvard Munch, Alan Moore, H. P. Lovecraft and French/euro comics, including works by Régis Loisel. She draws much of her inspiration from music, including the work of Kate Bush and Nina Hagen. The surreal quality of the series owes much to The Goodies, a popular British comedy from the 1970s.

== Characters ==
Jeremy Lachlan MacConnor
A gifted physicist who has trouble talking to girls. Scottish. Owner of Castle MacConnor. Wears a French Foreign Legion Kepi. Raised by his Uncle Angus and Aunt Lotte.

Nilson Maria Theresa "Nils" Kerr
Jeremy's constant companion, who teases him mercilessly, and also sometimes endangers his life.

Kate Provoczki
Nils' level-headed friend. Short black hair, built like a rake, became a journalist because she likes collecting gossip on people. Chain smokes.

André Provoczki
Kate's brother. Fond of his sister. Homosexual.

Angus James
Jeremy's uncle, also a scientist. He and Jeremy were kindred spirits. The character is visually based on Donald Sutherland's portrayal of Wilhelm Reich from the Cloudbusting video by Kate Bush.

Lotte MacConnor
Jeremy's aunt and grand matriarch of the family. Speaks in an accent so thick that it is at times difficult to read (which as some will tell you is how they talk in the Highlands). At times she seems to be no more than your typical senile old relative, yet she seems to retain a better grip on reality that most give her credit, even though it borders on the sinister at times. Cooper says that her bizarre dialogue is an attempt at a phonetic transcription of the Highland Scots accent.

Dougal MacWikkening
Jeremy's homicidal and immortal cousin. The character of Dougal, particularly his immortality, is influenced by the 1986 action/fantasy film Highlander. (His name, is a pun on Duncan, the protagonist of the Highlander television series and also the term "Quickening" which refers to the moment an Immortal slays another Immortal and gains his powers.)

Ziegfreid
Owner of the Platinum Grit Café, once described by Jeremy as "...more German than anyone has a right to be." Expert in coffee, weapons and relocating large buildings.

Raoul
A sentient, talking cabinet with a strong Jamaican accent. Never actually seen to be mobile in any way, but appears in numerous locations without explanation of how he got there, and was once heard (but not seen) talking on a telephone. Reportedly served in the merchant marine.

Terrence Morley
Agent and possible executor of the MacConnor Family Estate. Bitterly dislikes Angus and Jeremy. For a time operated the family's private sanitorium under the supervision of Lottie.

Doctor John Cottington
MacConnor Family Physician. Due to his position, he is very knowledgeable of the more mystical part of the family history. Despite a detached and pompous manner, he takes his role as a doctor very seriously and readily comes to the aid of Jeremy.

== Compilations ==
- In 1997, a special reprint of the first two issues was released, intended for overseas distribution. It is currently out of print.
- 2005 saw the release of trade paperback volumes 1 and 2 from self-publishing house Lulu.com. They contained issues 1-6 and 7-11 respectively. A third volume was later released in 2006, and featured issues 12–16. They are all currently out of print.
- In early 2009, Shadowline Comics published a new version of the volume 1 collection, which republished issues 1–5. This edition is of much higher quality than the Lulu printings. While it has been implied that further volumes will follow, as of September 2010 nothing has been announced.
