= Meatmen (comics) =

Erotic comic series

- Meatmen volume 1 (1986).

Publication information
- Publisher: Leyland Publications
- Schedule: irregular
- Format: anthology
- Genre: erotic, humor
- Publication date: 1986 – 2004
- No. of issues: 26
- Editor: Winston Leyland

Meatmen: An Anthology of Gay Male Comics is a series of paperback books collecting short comics featuring gay and bisexual male characters. The comics included a mixture of explicit erotica and humor. Between 1986 and 2004, 26 black-and-white volumes of the series (160–200 pages each) were published by Leyland Publications, making it the longest-running anthology of gay male pornographic comics.

During its run, the series was said to feature "every gay male cartoonist of note who has worked since the 1970s". Cartoonists whose work was featured include:

- Al Shapiro (A. Jay)
- Tim Barela
- Belasco
- Bruce Billings
- John Blackburn
- Howard Cruse
- Donelan (two front covers and many back covers)
- Kurt Erichsen
- Patrick Fillion
- Oliver Frey (Zack)
- M. J. Goldberg
- Joe Johnson
- Rupert Kinnard (as Prof. I.B. Gittendowne)
- Jeff Krell
- Mike Kuchar
- Touko Laaksonen (Tom of Finland)
- Jon Macy
- Jerry Mills
- Nico (early covers)
- Dom Orejudos (Stephen, Etienne)
- Brad Parker (early back covers)
- Sean (John Klamik)
- Bill Schmeling (Torro, The Hun)
- Robert Triptow
- Vaughn
- Bill Ward

== Controversy ==
In 2001, copies of Meatmen vol. 18 and 24 imported by Little Sister's bookstore of Vancouver, British Columbia were classified as "obscene" and seized by Canada Customs. This led to the case Little Sisters Book and Art Emporium v Canada, which was eventually decided by the Supreme Court of Canada in 2007.

== See also ==
- Gay Comix
