= Birdland (comic) =

Erotic comic book series

- Inez (left) and Bang Bang (right) on the cover of Birdland #2, art by Gilbert Hernandez.

Publication information
- Publisher: Eros Comics; Fantagraphics
- Schedule: Quarterly
- Format: Limited series
- Genre: Erotic
- Publication date: October 1990 - July 1991
- No. of issues: 3
- Main character(s): Fritz Herrera; Inez Perez; Bang Bang

Creative team
- Written by: Gilbert Hernandez
- Artist: Gilbert Hernandez

Collected editions
- Birdland: ISBN 9781560972006

Birdland is a creator-owned erotic comic book limited series created by Gilbert Hernandez. It was first published by Fantagraphics via their Eros Comix imprint between 1990 and 1991. The series features characters from the Love and Rockets series he devised along with his brothers Jaime and Mario but was marketed separately due to its highly explicit sexual content.

== Creation ==
Hernandez was finding the Poison River arc of Love and Rockets to be difficult creatively and wanted to write something lighter. He also felt the Bush administration signified a swing towards conservatism in American society, shaping his decision to create "a wild sex romp without any violence" and "a sitcom with tits". Fantagraphics owner Gary Groth had recently established the Eros Comix line to dig the company out of financial trouble, and asked Hernandez if he wanted to contribute. In conversation with his brother Jaime and Neil Gaiman, Hernandez felt it took part in the same parallel universe as pornography where "there's no AIDS, there's no rubbers".

Hernandez stated Birdland takes place in an "alternate dimension" to Love and Rockets, so as not to "spoil the relative purity of the Palomar work". He had been trying to find a larger role for Fritz since her brief debut in the first issue of Love and Rockets, and felt the character fit the need for a third lead in Birdland. He would subsequently feature the character heavily in other spin-off titles. Bang Bang and Inez Perez were other characters he had previously created in a non-Love and Rockets strip called Music for Monsters, and returned to for Birdland. Hernandez created Fritz's sister Petra by accident when attempting to salvage a rendering of Fritz herself for the cover of the first issue. Mark Herrara would subsequently be revisited as a Love and Rockets character.

== Publishing history ==
Birdland was initially published as a three-issue mini-series, mainly in black-and-white (with a small number of colour pages bookending the third issue). It was one of the first three titles released on the imprint, along with The Erotic Worlds of Frank Thorne and I Want to Be Your Dog. Eros Comics released a collected edition in July 1992 compiling all three issues, labelling it as Eros Graphic Novel #1 with a new ten-page epilogue. In 1996 they issued expanded editions of the first two individual issues, featuring additional sketches by Hernandez. The collected edition has since gone out of print.

Characters from Birdland also appeared in a strip Hernandez contributed to the 1991 benefit anthology comic The True North, published by the Comic Legends Legal Defense Fund to raise funds for two Canadian comic shop owners facing obscenity charges for selling adult-orientated titles. The one-page strip featured the characters questioning why violence was permissible in comics but sexual content was not.

== Synopsis ==
Businessman Mark Herrera can only find inspiration when he nears orgasm, but his therapist wife Fritz is uninterested in his sexual advances. As a result, he is having an affair with the hedonistic Bang Bang. Mark also has occasional and seemingly inexplicable bursts of ingenuity at other times - unknown to him this is because of his sister-in-law Petra climaxing while masturbating over thoughts of him. Bang Bang meanwhile works as a stripper in a raunchy act with best friend Inez, who is also having an affair with Mark (unknown to Bang Bang) and his brother Simon - who is obsessed with Fritz, having a particular fetish for her lisp. Fritz herself only gets aroused when her clients, under hypnosis via her heart-shaped pedant, tell of their sexual fantasies at her practice, called Birdland. Petra works as secretary at Birdland, where Bang Bang is a client due to her memories of alien abduction.

Bang Bang goes missing, while Mark has fend off Petra's advances and deal with his ex-wife, the vivacious stripper La Valda, ending up having oral sex with her in his office. Birdland comes under police investigation due to reports that Fritz is molesting her clients but she is able to successfully hypnotise the undercover officer before having sex with him. Bang Bang reappears but her performance is so arousing most of the club's male audience openly masturbate, causing the owner to fire Bang Bang and Inez when the club literally explodes. Instead they go to work with La Valda, but while she and Bang Bang quickly begin oral sex on each other, La Valda stumbles across an alien in Bang Bang's closet. Simon and Petra also hook up at a party, both fantasising their partner is the object of their affections. Soon after at Birdland, Petra walks in on Fritz having sex with a hypnotised client and joins in.

Using the pedant belonging to Fritz, Petra is able to put Mark under her control and have sex with him, while Fritz herself allows Simon to have anal sex with her. Bang Bang meanwhile is also under the control of a mysterious force, despite Inez coaxing her into an open-air threesome with her suitor Pee Wee. A mysterious light then appears, drawing Mark, Bang Bang, Fritz and the others towards it and into a flying saucer. Onboard they enjoy a huge orgy until one of the aliens throws Fritz's pendant out of the ship and she jumps after it, followed by Mark. When the pedant touches the ground it seemingly changes reality, with the characters swapping genders. Fritz then transforms into a woman once again and breaks the fourth wall, telling the reader they are getting "thleepy".

== Collected editions ==
Title	ISBN	Release date	Issues
Birdland	9781560972006	July 1992	Birdland #1-3

== Reception ==
Groth would recall that Birdland was a commercial hit, outselling Love and Rockets. Alex Chun reviewed the first issue of the series for Amazing Heroes, rating it 3½ out of 5 while praising the art and dialogue, but expressing reservations about how cluttered the narrative was.

In 1997, Todd Verbeek described Birdland as a "strange and erotic tale". Reflecting on Hernandez's career in 2011, The Comics Journal, writer Tom De Haven defending the "sheer smutty recklessness" of Birdland but felt the series started a downturn in the coherence and quality of the artist's output. Win Wiachek of Now Read This was impressed by how much there was to Birdland in addition to having a large amount of "squirty, slurpy stuff"., while Chris Randle of Hazlitt called it "sweetly filthy". Revisiting the series in 2012 for ComicsAlliance, Douglas Wolk praised Birdland for its "absurd and sly" humour. Frank Plowright was more reserved when reviewing the book for Slings & Arrows, finding the book funny but considering the surreal coda to be a disappointment.
