= Oliver Frey =

Swiss artist (1948–2022)

- Born: 30 June 1948; Zürich, Switzerland
- Died: 21 August 2022 (aged 74)
- Other name: Zack
- Education: Famous Artists School
- Known for: Science-fiction illustration, erotic comics
- Spouse: Roger Kean

Oliver Frey (/freɪ/; 30 June 1948 – 21 August 2022) was a Swiss artist, based in the United Kingdom. He was known for his book and magazine illustrations, especially British computer magazines of the 1980s. Under the pen name Zack, he became known for his erotic illustrations and erotic comics in British gay male porn magazines of the 1970s and 1980s.

== Early life ==
Frey was born in Zürich, Switzerland, on 30 June 1948. He grew up fluent in Italian and German. His family moved to Britain in 1956 but subsequently returned to Switzerland. During his high school years in Switzerland, Frey enrolled in the American Famous Artists School correspondence course.

== Career ==
After spending six months in the Swiss army and dropping out of Berne University, Frey moved back to Britain and started a two-year course at the London Film School, during which he supported himself with freelance work, including illustrating War Picture Library comic books. As a child Frey had loved The Eagle comics magazine, and as an adult worked on the 1980s revival, drawing the strip Dan Dare. Also during the 1970s, he illustrated for IPC Media's Look and Learn magazine, including the strip The Trigan Empire. He was commissioned to create 1930s-era comic book art for the pre-title sequence of the 1978 movie Superman.

Cover of Bike Boy by Zack

Through the late 1970s and the 1980s Frey was a prolific creator of gay erotic art, usually published under the pen name Zack. These included a comics series featuring a big, muscular bad-boy hero named "Rogue" for HIM Magazine, a monthly gay male pornography publication which he and his partner Roger Kean owned, along with related titles. He also produced, edited, and illustrated several issues of Man-to-Man Magazine. Frey illustrated twelve of the HIM Libraries, the first two written by Kean, the remainder by various authors who submitted manuscripts. The company was raided by the police in 1981, and all of its stock was destroyed under then-current laws. His gay pornographic work was also featured on front covers and in volumes of the Meatmen series of gay erotic comics. Russell T. Davies, writer of the British television series Queer as Folk, praised Frey's serial "The Street" as an important influence on his ground-breaking gay TV drama.

Cover of The Fantasy Art of Oliver Frey

When Roger Kean and Frey's brother Franco founded the computer magazine CRASH in 1983, Oliver Frey became the magazine's illustrator. He went on to illustrate for CRASH's sister magazines Zzap!64, Amtix, and The Games Machine. He illustrated the comic strip "Terminal Man", written by Kelvin Gosnell, which was serialised in both CRASH and Zzap!64 in 1984, and published as a complete story in a large format book in 1988.

During the late 1990s, Frey worked as publishing director for Thalamus Publishing in Shropshire, which specialised in illustrated historical reference titles. Thalamus Publishing went into receivership in August 2009. Frey and Kean formed Reckless Books in Ludlow, specialising in young adult action-adventure, historical, and gay adult reading.

Several of Frey's painted front covers for Fleetway and IPC War Picture Libraries were reproduced from the original art in two of David Roach's books, Aaargh! It's War in 2007, and The Art of War in 2008. Frey is the illustrator of over 16 books under the name Oliver Frey and over 12 under the pseudonym Zack. Classic video gaming magazine Retro Gamer has featured Frey's artwork on its cover. In July and August 2014 his gay erotic work was included in an exhibition at the British Library, where he was interviewed by novelist and reporter Rupert Smith.

== Personal life ==
Frey lived with his long-time partner Roger Kean in the United Kingdom. He died on 21 August 2022, at the age of 74. Kean died on 3 January 2023 from motor neurone disease.

== Selected bibliography ==
=== As Oliver Frey ===
- Dan Dare:
  - "Return of the Mekon" (in Eagle #17–18, 1982)
  - "Belendotor" (in Eagle #84–93, 1983)
- Roger Kean: The Fantasy Art of Oliver Frey (Thalamus Publishing, 2006), ISBN 9781902886060
- Oliver Frey, artist: The Terminal Man Crash, 1984. (Reprinted Reckless Books, 2012) ISBN 9781479333691
- Roger Kean, author; Oliver Frey, illustrator: Living in the Ancient World Set (Chelsea House Publications. 2008) ISBN 9780816063369
- Oliver Frey, illustrator: Exciting Stories Of Fantasy and the Future (Hamlyn 1982) ISBN 9780600366775
- Roger Kean, author; Oliver Frey, illustrator: The Complete Chronicle of the Emperors Of Rome (Thalamus Publishing, 2005) ISBN 9781902886053
- Chris Wilkins and Roger Kean, authors; Oliver Frey, illustrator: Ocean, The History (Apple 2014)
- Roger Kean, author; Oliver Frey, illustrator: Forgotten power: Byzantium: Bulwark of Christianity (Reckless Books, 2013) ISBN 9781301533398

=== As Zack ===
- Twisted Blade in the Arena (Bruno Gmunder Verlag 2017) ISBN 9783959852814
- Desert Studs (Bruno Gmunder Verlag 2014) ISBN 9783867876902
- The Satyr of Capri (Bruno Gmunder Verlag 2015) ISBN 9783867878548
- Deadly Circus of Desire (Bruno Gmunder Verlag 2014) ISBN 9783867877855
- The Warrior's Boy (Bruno Gmunder Verlag 2013) ISBN 9783867876056
- The Wrath of Seth (Bruno Gmunder Verlag 2016) ISBN 9783959851558
- Zack: The Art (Bruno Gmunder Verlag, 2012) ISBN 9783867874328
- Bike Boy (Bruno Gmünder Group, 2010) ISBN 9783867871587
- Hot For Boys: The Sexy Adventures Of Rogue (Bruno Gmünder Group, 2011) ISBN 9783867871013
- Bike Boy Rides Again (Bruno Gmünder Group, 2012) ISBN 9783867871761
- Boys of Vice City (The Adventures of Gil Graham & Mike Smith #1) (Bruno Gmünder Group, 2011) ISBN 9783867871204
- Boys of Two Cities (Bruno Gmunder Verlag 2012) ISBN 9783867874458
- Raw Recruits (Bruno Gmunder Verlag 2013) ISBN 9783867875196
