= The Ledger Awards =

Australian comic awards

Ledger Award
- Awarded for: Excellence in Australian comic art and publishing
- Location: Melbourne
- Country: Australia
- First award: 2005
- Website: http://ledgerawards.org (no longer live)

The Ledger Awards are prizes awarded to "acknowledge excellence in Australian comic art and publishing." Named after pioneering Australian cartoonist Peter Ledger (1945–1994), the awards were first held in 2005 to help promote and focus attention on Australian creators and their projects, both in Australia and overseas. Initially, the awards were held annually and announced online on or around Australia Day, 26 January. In recent years, they have been held at the State Library of Victoria on the Friday evening before the Melbourne Supanova convention.

== History ==
The Ledger Awards began in 2004 as a fully independent, non-profit initiative. They were presented under the auspices of LitterArtsy, a non-profit coalition of creators, publishers and web sites promoting literacy, creativity, craft and excellence through comics and sequential art, and had no affiliations or links with organisations, businesses, or other parties.

The Ledger Awards were presented annually until 2007, when they went on hiatus. In 2010 it was announced that a new Ledger Awards Organising Committee had been formed; the Committee held an inaugural meeting, with a view to the awards being re-established in 2011.

In late 2013 it was announced that the Ledger Awards would return after a five-year hiatus in April 2014, with a new major sponsor, Supanova Pop Culture Expo. The 2014 Ledger Awards ceremony was held 11 April 2014, at the State Library of Victoria.

On 12 April 2014 the Ledger Awards named "gap year" award recipients for the years 2008–2013 when no Ledger Awards were distributed.

== Awards ==
=== 2004 ===
Nominees were suggested through a forum thread, compiled into a poll and winners were decided by popular vote. The winners were announced on Australia Day, 2005.

The nominees and winners in the first year were

PERSON OF THE YEAR

- Mark Selan (Winner)
- Aaron Burgess
- Daniel Zachariou

ACHIEVEMENT OF THE YEAR

- Gary Chaloner's John Law in print (Winner)
- Dillon Naylor's 2004 (Batrisha wear in Target etc.)
- Phase Two Comics

NEW TALENT DESERVING WIDER RECOGNITION

- Matt Huynh (Winner)
- Jase Harper
- Chelsea Fritzlaff

SMALL PRESS TITLE OF THE YEAR

- Eat Comics, Tonia Walden, editor (Winner)
- Sporadic, Jase Harper & Jules Faber, editors
- Dirty Little Creep, Mandy Ord

INDEPENDENT PRESS TITLE OF THE YEAR

- The Crumpleton Experiments, Nautilus Illustrations (Winner)
- Killeroo, Ozone Studios
- Azerath, Creatorline/Phosphorescent Comics

INTERNATIONAL TITLE OF THE YEAR

- Will Eisner's John Law: Dead Man Walking, IDW (Winner)
- Small Gods, Image Comics
- District X, Marvel Comics

ANTHOLOGY OF THE YEAR

- Eat Comics, Tonia Walden, editor (Winner)
- Sporadic, Jase Harper & Jules Faber, editors
- The Ink, Aaron Burgess, editor

WEBCOMIC OF THE YEAR

- Platinum Grit (Winner)
- Will Eisner's John Law
- Raymondo Person

WRITER OF THE YEAR

- Trudy Cooper et al. (Winner)
- Christian Read
- Daniel Reed

ARTIST OF THE YEAR

- Trudy Cooper (Winner)
- Jason Badower
- Jase Harper

INKER OF THE YEAR

- Gary Chaloner (Winner)
- Doug Holgate
- Darren Close
- Daniel Reed

COLOURIST OF THE YEAR

- Annette Kwok (Winner)
- Doug Holgate
- Jason Badower

LETTERER OF THE YEAR

- Gary Chaloner (Winner)
- Jason Paulos
- Jason Kovacs

COVER ARTIST OF THE YEAR

- Gary Chaloner, Will Eisner's John Law: Dead Man Walking (Winner)
- Matt Huynh, Domino Joe, Bloom
- Jason Badower, Killeroo Book 2

SINGLE ISSUE OR STORY OF THE YEAR

- 'Law, Luck and a Dead Eyed Mystic' (Will Eisner's John Law: Dead Man Walking), Gary Chaloner (Winner)
- The Eldritch Kid #1, Christian Read & Christopher Burns
- 'Meat Burger Heaven' (Eat Comics), Dean Rankine
- 'Good for the Goose' (Killeroo Book 2), Jan Napiorkowski & Jason Badower

COMIC STRIP OF THE YEAR

- Batrisha (K-Zone et al.), Dillon Naylor (Winner)
- Grossgirl and Boogerboy (Mania), Dean Rankine
- Raymondo Person, Patrick Alexander

RETAIL OUTLET OF THE YEAR

- Kings Comics, Sydney (Winner)
- Phase Two Comics, online
- Minotaur Books, Melbourne

DESIGN OR PRESENTATION OF THE YEAR

- The Watch: Casus Belli, design by Karen Howard (Winner)
- Killeroo Book Two, design by Darren Close
- Keychain Comics, design by Aaron Burgess

LEDGER OF HONOUR

- Peter Ledger* (automatically inducted)
- Gary Chaloner (Winner)
- Trudy Cooper
- Tim McEwen
- Tonia Walden

=== 2005 ===
Feedback from the first Awards resulted in a reduction in categories and the installation of a Judges Panel. Again, nominations were made by the public through postings on a message board forum. Some categories were decided by public vote, others were judged by the panel.

The first iteration of the Judges Panel was Mark Selan, Denis Kitchen, Roger Langridge, Glen Lumsden and Kevin Patrick. Denis Kitchen pulled out and was replaced with Mark Waid, Waid was then replaced by RC Harvey. Both Langridge and Harvey were replaced by Tad Pietrzykowski and Gary Chaloner.

The popular voted winners were announced on Australia Day 2006.

==== Publicly voted categories ====
ACHIEVEMENT OF THE YEAR (Australian artist, publisher, entrepreneur or event – business or creative)

- GOLD: Operation Funnybone (Glen Shearer, co-ordinator)
- SILVER: OzComics 24 Hour Comics Challenge (Mark Selan, co-ordinator)
- BRONZE: Pulp Faction Forums (Maggie McFee, co-ordinator)

TALENT DESERVING WIDER RECOGNITION (In recognition of excellence in 2005 – print or web)

- GOLD: Stephen Crowley
- SILVER: Dean Rankine
- BRONZE: Steve Martinez

RETAIL OUTLET OF THE YEAR (In recognition of Australian retail excellence and support during the year)

- GOLD: Phase Two Comics, online
- SILVER: Kings Comics, Sydney
- BRONZE: Minotaur Books, Melbourne

FAVOURITE FOREIGN COMIC BOOK OR GRAPHIC NOVEL OF THE YEAR (Favourite comic book or graphic novel (English or foreign language) released by overseas publishers during the year)

- GOLD: Flight 2
- SILVER: Daisy Kutter – The Last Train
- BRONZE: Garfield

FAVOURITE FOREIGN CREATOR OF THE YEAR (Favourite international creator (artist, writer etc.) with work released during the year)

- GOLD: Mike Mignola
- SILVER: Kazu Kibuishi
- BRONZE: Paul Grist

==== Peer voted categories ====
The Judges Awards were announced at Doujicon on 28 July 2006

SMALL PRESS TITLE OF THE YEAR (Mini comics, zines featuring comic content etc.)

- GOLD: Happy Birthday Anyway – Matt Huynh
- SILVER: Pirates – Tonia Walden
- BRONZE: Dreams of Tomorrow – Liz Argall

INDEPENDENT PRESS TITLE OF THE YEAR (Local publishers distributing mainly in Australia)

- GOLD: Eldritch Kid by Christian Read (story) & Christopher Burns (Art), Phosphorescent Comics/Creatorline
- SILVER: Platinum Grit by Trudy Cooper, Doug Bayne and Danny Murphy
- BRONZE: The Crumpleton Experiments by Daniel Reed, Nautilus Illustrations

INTERNATIONAL TITLE OF THE YEAR (Titles distributed overseas and within Australia featuring Australian talent)

- GOLD: Small Gods – Jason Rand (story) Image Comics
- SILVER: Fell – Ben Templesmith (art) Image Comics
- BRONZE: DeeVee – Flange, Eddie Campbell, Daren White & various. DeeVee Press (90)

WEBCOMIC OR COMIC OF THE YEAR (Webcomics or comic strips produced by Australian creators)

- GOLD: Big Fun Mega Happy Pet Land by Jase Harper (Mania Magazine)
- SILVER: Magellan by Stephen Crowley
- BRONZE: Raymondo Person by Patrick Alexander

WRITER OF THE YEAR (In recognition of writing excellence in 2005 by an Australian creator – print or web)

- GOLD: Trudy Cooper (Platinum Grit)
- SILVER: Christian Read (Eldritch Kid, various)
- BRONZE: Matt Huynh (Happy Birthday Anyway, various)

ARTIST OF THE YEAR (Full art, penciller, painter or multimedia. In recognition of excellence in 2005 by an Australian creator – print or web)

- GOLD: Doug Holgate ('Laika', various)
- SILVER: Trudy Cooper (Platinum Grit)
- BRONZE: Matt Huynh (Happy Birthday Anyway, various)

SINGLE ISSUE OR STORY OF THE YEAR (In recognition of excellence in a particular issue or short story in 2005 by an Australian creator/s – print or web)

- GOLD: "Laika" by Doug Holgate, (Flight Vol.2)
- SILVER: "The Record" by Christian Read (story) & Tonia Walden (art), (Something Wicked)
- BRONZE: Star Wars Tales No. 27, illustrated by Nicola Scott (Dark Horse Comics)

PRODUCTION DESIGN OF THE YEAR (Australian artist, publisher, entrepreneur or event – business or creative)

- GOLD: Glen Shearer and Darren Close, Operation Funnybone
- SILVER: Troy Kealley (cover by Simon Sherry), Something Wicked
- BRONZE: Tonia Walden, Pirates, various

LEDGER OF HONOUR (Nominees chosen from Australian creators, publishers or retailers past or present)

- Peter Ledger (automatically inducted)
- Gary Chaloner (2005)
- Trudy Cooper (2006)

=== 2006 ===
The nominees for work published in the 2006 calendar year, and to be presented in 2007 are as follows:

==== Publicly voted categories ====
ACHIEVEMENT OF THE YEAR

- OzComics 24 Hour Comics Challenge 2006
- Surfing the Deathline
- Doujicon
- Heroes and Villains Exhibition – (State Library of Victoria)
- Local Act Comics

RETAIL OUTLET OF THE YEAR

- Kings Comics, Sydney
- Minotaur Books, Melbourne
- Phase Two Comics, online
- Pulp Fiction, Adelaide

FAVOURITE FOREIGN COMIC BOOK OR GRAPHIC NOVEL OF THE YEAR

- Allstar Superman (DC Comics)
- Monster (Viz)
- Fell (Image Comics)
- The Losers (DC/Vertigo)
- The Boys (DC/Vertigo)
- Invincible (Image Comics)
- Hellboy: Strange Places (Dark Horse Comics)
- The Dark Horse Book of Monsters (Dark Horse Comics)

FAVOURITE FOREIGN CREATOR OF THE YEAR

- Jeffrey Brown
- Brian K. Vaughan
- Frank Quitely
- Jock
- Garth Ennis
- Peter David
- Adam Hughes
- Warren Ellis
- Colleen Doran

LEDGER OF HONOUR

- Greg Gates
- Dillon Naylor
- Jason Paulos

==== Jury selection ====
The following categories will be decided by the judging panel from the top nominations listed:

AUSTRALIAN TITLE OF THE YEAR

- Surfing the Deathline, Matt Godden (story & art), Golgotha Graphics
- Passionate Nomads, Philip Bentley and various
- Azerath by Daniel Lawson (story) and Ryan Wilton (art), Phosphorescent Comics/Creatorline

INTERNATIONAL TITLE OF THE YEAR

- What If? X-Men: Deadly Genesis, David Yardin (art) Marvel Comics
- Birds of Prey, Nicola Scott (art) DC Comics
- Detective Comics, Shane McCarthy (story) DC Comics

WEBCOMIC OR COMIC STRIP OF THE YEAR

- Platinum Grit by Trudy Cooper and Danny Murphy [webcomic view]
- Maxwell the Demon by Tonia Walden [webcomic view]
- Comicsface by Ive Sorocuk

WRITER OF THE YEAR

- Matt Godden (Surfing the Deathline)
- Philip Bentley (Passionate Nomads, Word Balloons)
- Graeme McDonald (Vigil, After Life)

ARTIST OF THE YEAR

- Trudy Cooper (Platinum Grit)
- Matt Godden (Surfing the Deathline)
- Colin Wells (Vigil)
- David Yardin (What If? X-Men: Deadly Genesis, various )

SINGLE ISSUE OR STORY OF THE YEAR

- "The Amorous Adventures of Jane Digby", Philip Bentley (story) and various (artist), Passionate Nomads
- "Surfing the Deathline, Episode 1" by Matt Godden (story & art), Surfing the Deathline No. 1
- "Crab Allan: Gothic Boogaloo" by Luke Weber (story & art), Sureshot Presents...

PRODUCTION DESIGN OF THE YEAR

- Darrel Merritt, Passionate Nomads
- Matt Godden, Surfing the Deathline
- David Cunning, Local Act Comics

=== 2007 ===
The nominees and winners for 2007 were:

AUSTRALIAN TITLE OF THE YEAR (local publishers distributing mainly in Australia)

- "Passionate Nomads" – Philip Bentley and various (winner)
- "Surfing the Deathline" – Matt Godden (story & art), Golgotha Graphics
- "Azerath" – Daniel Lawson (story) and Ryan Wilton (art), Phosphorescent Comics/Creatorline

INTERNATIONAL TITLE OF THE YEAR (titles distributed overseas and within Australia featuring Australian talent)

- "What If: X-Men" – David Yardin (pencils), Marvel Comics (winner)
- "Birds of Prey" – Nicola Scott (art). DC Comics
- "Detective Comics" – Shane McCarthy (writer), DC Comics

WEBCOMIC OR COMIC STRIP OF THE YEAR (produced by Australian creators)

- "Platinum Grit" – Trudy Cooper/Danny Murphy (winner/tie)
- "Maxwell – Demon" by Tonia Walden (winner/tie)
- "Comicsface" – Ive Sorocuk

WRITER OF THE YEAR (print or web)

- Philip Bentley ("Passionate Nomads", Word Balloons)
- Matt Godden ("Surfing the Deathline", Golgotha Graphics)
- Graeme McDonald ("Vigil", After Life)

ARTIST OF THE YEAR (full art, penciller, painter or multimedia. Print or web)

- Trudy Cooper ("Platinum Grit")
- David Yardin ("What If? X-Men: Deadly Genesis", various )
- Matt Godden ("Surfing the Deathline")

SINGLE ISSUE OR STORY OF THE YEAR (print or web)

- "The Amorous Adventures of Jane Digby", Philip Bentley (story) and various (artist), Passionate Nomads (winner)
- "Surfing the Deathline, Episode 1" by Matt Godden (story & art), Surfing the Deathline No. 1
- "Crab Allan: Gothic Boogaloo" by Luke Weber (story & art), Sureshot Presents...

PRODUCTION DESIGN OF THE YEAR (Australian comic, website, publication or event)

- Darrel Merritt ("Passionate Nomads") (winner)
- Matt Godden ("Surfing the Deathline")
- David Cunning (Local Act Comics)

ACHIEVEMENT OF THE YEAR (Australian artist, publisher, entrepreneur or event. Business or creative)

- Doujicon (Avi Bernshaw, co-ordinator) (winner)
- 24 Hour Comics Challenge (Mark Selan, co-ordinator)
- Heroes and Villains Exhibition (Kevin Patrick, curator)

RETAIL OUTLET OF THE YEAR (in recognition of Australian retail excellence and support in 2006)

- Kings Comics, Sydney (winner/tie)
- Phase Two Comics, Pulp Fiction (winner/tie)
- Minotaur Books, Melbourne

FAVOURITE FOREIGN COMIC BOOK OR GRAPHIC NOVEL OF THE YEAR (favourite comic book or graphic novel (English or foreign language) released by overseas publishers during the year)

- "All-Star Superman" (DC Comics) (winner)
- "Fell" (Image Comics)
- "Hellboy: Strange Places" (Dark Horse Comics)

FAVOURITE FOREIGN CREATOR OF THE YEAR (favourite international creator (artist, writer etc.) with work released during the year)

- Frank Quitely (winner)
- Garth Ennis
- Warren Ellis

LEDGER OF HONOUR (nominees chosen from Australian creators, publishers or retailers past or present).

- Greg Gates (2007)
