= Class Comics =

Canadian comic book publisher

- Status: Active
- Founded: 1995
- Founder: Patrick Fillion
- Country of origin: Canada
- Headquarters location: Vancouver, British Columbia
- Publication types: Comic books
- Nonfiction topics: Gay erotica
- Official website: classcomics.com

Class Comics is a Canadian independent comic books publisher, founded in 1995 by Patrick Fillion as Class Enterprises, which specializes in gay erotic comics. Class Comics Inc. is now run by Fillion and his partner Fraser in Vancouver, British Columbia. Fillion has written and illustrated the largest share of Class Comics current catalogue.

Its titles include: Guardians of the Cube, Satisfaction Guaranteed, Camili-Cat, Naked Justice, Rapture, Deimos, Porky, "Rainbow Country" and The Pornomicon. Artists published by the company include French Logan and Max, and Spanish Ismael Álvarez. In 2015, Class began distributing digital editions of Dale Lazarov's Sticky Graphic Novels imprint.

Class Comics has introduced their comic and art book collections to the German and French audience through European publishers Bruno Gmünder and H & O Editions. The company publishes digital editions of some titles through MiKandi.

== Titles ==
- Alex in Bonerland #1
- All in a Night (Digital Graphic Novel)
- Angelface #1-2
- Animales #1
- ARTCOCK (Digital only)
- Beautiful Dead #1
- Boxing Julian (Digital Graphic Novel)
- Boytoon Adventures #1
- Brother to Dragons #1-2
- Camili-Cat 20th Anniversary
- Camili-Cat Diplomatic Immunity
- Camili-Cat Felinoids #1-3
- Camili-Cat Love Lost #1
- Camili-Cat Mounted (Digital only)
- Captive Spirit #1 (Digital only)
- Class Comics Hook-Ups #1 Mako Finn and Space Cadet
- Crash Course #1
- Crash Course #2 (Digital only)
- Deimos #0-2
- Deimos 2 Noir (Digital only)
- Deimos Dead of Winter (Digital only)
- Deimos Tenth Anniversary
- Detective Anvil #1 (Digital only)
- Dick #1 (Digital only)
- Dick #2 (Digital only)
- Drake in Power Play (Digital only)
- Freshmen Tailz (Digital only)
- Ghostboy & Diablo #1-4
- Ghostboy and Diablo 7 Days Digital Mini Comic
- Guardians of the Cube #1-5
- Halloween Special Meaty (Digital only)
- Heroes In Peril Meaty (Digital only)
- Hotcha Muscle Meaty (Digital only)
- In the Blink of an Eye
- Ismael Portfolio
- KEYS #1-5 (Digital only)
- Lawsuit and T-Boy #1
- Leon de Leon's Meaty (Digital only)
- Locus #1
- Logan's Christmas Meaty (Digital only)
- Logan's Vargas Twins (Digital only)
- Long Road to the Sea
- Lost Kingdom #1
- Mako Fin #1-3
- Manson #1-4 (Digital only)
- Mini-Boytoon Adventures #1: Locus and the Law
- Naked Justice #1-2, #1 in color
- Naked Justice Beginnings #1-3
- Planet of Machos #1
- Porky #1-4
- Rainbow Country #1-2
- Rapture #1-5
- Ridehard #1-2
- Sandstorm #1
- Satisfaction Guaranteed #1-4
- Sinner's Edge #1
- Sons of the Night #1 (Digital only)
- Space Cadet #1-2
- Spring Break Mini-Comic
- Striptease #1
- Straight To… #1-2 (Digital only)
- Stripshow #2-3
- Stripshow: The Collection Vol 1
- Summer Special Meaty (Digital only)
- Sworn #1
- Tales of the Taro Demon:Deimos #1
- The Bromance #1
- The HvH Portfolio
- The Initiation #1-3
- The Last Merman #1-4
- The Mark of Aecus #1-2
- The Mike Portfolio
- The Pack #1
- The Pornomicon
- The Power of Love (Digital only)
- Tug Harder #1-3
- Vargas Twins #2 (Digital only)
- Zahn #1-3
