= Portland Alliance =

- Type: Monthly newspaper
- Editor: Tim Flanagan
- Founded: 1981
- Ceased publication: June 2011
- Headquarters: 6935 SW Merry Lane, 97008; United States
- Circulation: approx. 21,000
- Website: theportlandalliance.org

The Portland Alliance is a free monthly newspaper in Portland, Oregon. The newspaper is the primary project of a non-profit organization, the Northwest Alliance for Alternative Media and Education (NAAME). The newspaper has no paid staff and is developed and distributed by volunteers.

Describing itself as "Portland's oldest alternative progressive newspaper," the newspaper typically explores the topics of environmentalism, trade unions, social justice, and other topics "missed by the mainstream press".

In 2000, investigative journalism by the newspaper uncovered a series of tapes in which the Portland Police Chief at the time, Mark Kroeker, made anti-gay statements ten years before. This was the first in a series of public embarrassments for Kroeker, who was eventually forced to resign as Portland Police Chief in 2003.

The Portland Alliance was nominated for an Utne Independent Press Award in 2003 in the category "Local/Regional Coverage".

The paper ceased publishing a print edition in June 2011, but continues to maintain an online presence as of Aug. 2, 2022.

== See also ==
- Alternative Media
