= Kake (comics) =

Character and series created by Tom of Finland

- Illustration of Kake by Tom of Finland (1988)

Publication information
- Publisher: DFT (1968–1971); Revolt Press (1971–1980); Coq (1971–1980); Tom of Finland Company (1982–1986)
- First appearance: Kake: The Intruder (1968)
- Created by: Tom of Finland
Kake
Publication information
- Schedule: Irregular
- Format: Ongoing series
- Genre: Erotic
- Publication date: 1968– 1986
- No. of issues: 26

Kake (/ˈkɑːkɛ/ KAH-keh; Finnish pronunciation: [ˈkɑke]) is a fictional character created by Tom of Finland, the pseudonym of Finnish artist Touko Laaksonen. A gay leatherman distinguished by his hypermasculine physical characteristics and his frequent sexual encounters, Kake appears as the title character of a 26-issue erotic comic book series published by Laaksonen from 1968 to 1986.

Though Laaksonen drew artwork featuring leathermen as early as the 1950s, the ongoing Kake comic was originally commissioned by the Danish pornography publishing house DFT in the late 1960s. It was Laaksonen's first comic to be sold as individual comic books; his previous comics in the magazine Physique Pictorial were published as partial excerpts, with the full work sold separately by mail order as a set of five to fifteen printed panels. The publication of Kake transferred to Revolt Press in 1971, and to the Tom of Finland Company in 1982.

Laaksonen's illustrations of leathermen, as exemplified by Kake, significantly influenced the aesthetics of the gay leather subculture. Kake is among Laaksonen's most popular creations, having been alternately described as his "most iconic character" and as "the gay world's most familiar pin-up icon".

== Characterization ==
A page from Kake: The Cock D'or (1971). A typical Kake comic is composed of a sequence of several full-page panels that feature little to no dialogue.

Kake is a highly sexualized, highly idealized character distinguished by his hypermasculine physical characteristics, chiefly his developed muscles and exceptionally large penis. In most stories Kake is portrayed as a mustachioed leatherman, wearing clothing that is typically associated with the aesthetics of biker culture: a leather jacket, leather breeches, knee-high leather riding boots, and a leather peaked cap. The character occasionally also appears in other commonly fetishized uniforms, such as those of a policeman or a mechanic.

The defining traits of Kake's character are his friendly and easygoing personality, and his promiscuity. The character's affable disposition intentionally contrasts typical portrayals of leathermen in heterosexual culture as menacing or dangerous, while his frequent sexual encounters reflect the attitudes of the sexual liberation movement that emerged in the 1960s. Writer F. Valentine Hooven III notes that when the series focuses on subjects such as BDSM or rape fetishism, any sadistic acts performed by Kake are rendered as "innocent fun," and that the characters Kake performs these acts on are "welcome to do the same to him."

A typical issue of Kake focuses on the character as he encounters and has sex with a similarly muscular and well-endowed man or group of men. These men are often archetypal characters that embody traditional masculine roles, such as police officers, sailors, lumberjacks, businessmen, or cowboys; the setting, such as a public restroom or a park, also plays a role in the content of the story. Stories are typically composed of approximately twenty full-page panels, and are told mostly without dialogue. When dialogue is included, such as an occasional exclamatory line or as incidental writing (signs, graffiti, etc.), it is written in English.

== History ==
=== Context ===
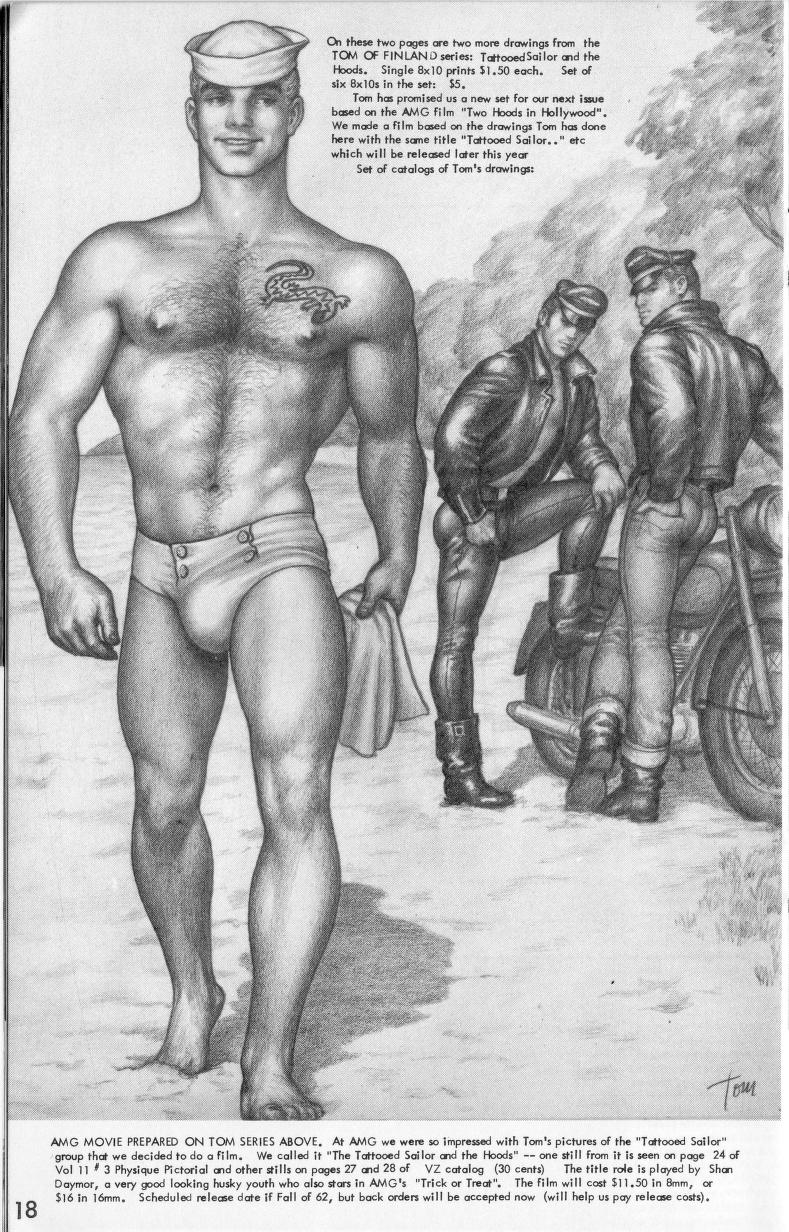
Laaksonen drew artwork featuring leathermen as early as the 1950s, as in this excerpt from his comic The Tattooed Sailor published the July 1962 issue of Physique Pictorial.

Laaksonen began drawing multi-panel stories in 1946 as personal projects and as gifts for friends, and drew artwork featuring leathermen as early as the 1950s. He did not submit his comics for publication until the 1960s; his first published comic The Tattooed Sailor was published in the August 1961 issue of Physique Pictorial, a magazine that was the first outlet to publish his illustrations in 1957. Laaksonen's early published illustrations and comics were typically suggestively homoerotic rather than explicitly pornographic, though as censorship laws began to relax towards the end of the 1960s, he began to depict more overtly sexual material in his work. These early comics were one-shots (single stand-alone stories), but by 1965 Laaksonen had begun to experiment with recurring characters: first a character named Mike (Note: Mike was named "Vicky" in his early appearances; "Viki" is a common Finnish male name.) and later a Tarzan-inspired character named Jack.

=== Production ===
Kake was commissioned by Michael Holm, who oversaw gay pornography publishing at the Danish pornography publishing house DFT, and who had approached Laaksonen about publishing an ongoing comic series with the company in the late 1960s. Interior pages for the series were drawn as black line art drawings while covers were drawn as detailed pencil illustrations, a format chosen so as to be easily reproducible at a low cost. Laaksonen often drew using photo-referencing, and frequently used photographs he shot himself of friends or amateur models wearing uniforms or demonstrating poses. The physical appearance of Kake is based on one of Laaksonen's regular photo reference models, a man from northern Finland named Eero he met while visiting Stockholm. Throughout the 1960s and 1970s, Eero regularly visited Laaksonen in Helsinki to pose as reference for the character. The name "Kake" is a Finnish nickname that has the macho connotations of the English nickname "Butch"; it was also the name of one of Laaksonen's friends.

=== Publication ===
Kake: The Intruder, the first comic in the Kake series, was published by DFT in 1968. While Laaksonen's early comics for Physique Pictorial were published in the magazine as partial excerpts, with the full comic sold separately as a set of five to fifteen panels priced at USD$1.50 per page, issues of Kake were sold as discrete comic books. Laaksonen had a strained working relationship with DFT; he felt he was underpaid for Kake, and the company retained ownership of the original artwork for the series. Holm established his own publishing house in his native Sweden, Revolt Press, in 1970. He asked Laaksonen to begin publishing Kake with the company, and offered a higher page rate and full ownership of all original artwork; Laaksonen accepted, and Kake began being published by Revolt Press in 1971. That same year, Danish publishing house Coq also began publishing Kake.

In 1979, Laaksonen and Durk Dehner established the Tom of Finland Company, a mail order company that became the sole publisher of Kake and all other books and commercial products featuring Laaksonen's artwork. The company published a new Kake story, Kake in the Wild West, as its first book in 1982; it quickly sold out its entire first print run. A second edition with larger pages, improved paper quality, and a new section of archival illustrations titled "Tom's Archives" also sold out its print run. The success of Kake in the Wild West prompted the Tom of Finland Company to produce similar premium-format comic books for back issues of Kake that had reverted to Laaksonen's ownership.

The final Kake comic, Oversexed Office, was published in 1986; after being diagnosed with emphysema in 1988, Laaksonen developed a tremble in his hands that restricted his ability to draw, and he died in 1991. The series has been anthologized several times, notably by the art book publishing house Taschen, which published all issues of the series as The Complete Kake Comics in 2008. The majority of the original artwork for Kake has been recovered by the Tom of Finland Foundation, and is preserved in the organization's archive.

== List of issues ==
Issue titles and release years are sourced from The Complete Kake Comics.

- Kake: The Intruder (issue 1, 1968)
- Kake: The Sexy Sunbather (issue 2, 1968)
- Kake: Cock-Hungry Cops (issue 3, 1968)
- Kake: Nasty Nature Trail (issue 4, 1969)
- Kake: Punishment (issue 5, 1970)
- Kake: Threesome (issue 6, 1970)
- Kake: Tea Room Odyssey (issue 7, 1970)
- Kake: Hi-Jacked (issue 8, 1971)
- Kake: The Cock D'or (issue 9, 1971)
- Kake: Raunchy Truckers (issue 10, 1971)
- Kake: TV Repair (issue 11, 1972)
- Kake: Service Station (issue 12, 1972)
- Kake: Sightseeing (issue 13, 1973)
- Kake: Sadist (issue 14, 1973)
- Kake: Violent Visitor (issue 15, 1974)
- Kake: Sex on the Train (issue 16, 1974)
- Kake: Loading Zone (issue 17, 1975)
- Kake: Pants Down, Sailor! (issue 18, 1975)
- Kake: The Curious Captain (issue 19, 1975)
- Kake: Pleasure Park (issue 20, 1977)
- Kake Special: Greasy Rider (issue 21, 1978)
- Kake: Highway Patrol (issue 22, 1980)
- Kake in the Wild West (issue 23, 1982)
- Kake in Canada (issue 24, 1984)
- Kake: Postal Rape (issue 25, 1984)
- Kake: Oversexed Office (issue 26, 1986)

== Reception and legacy ==
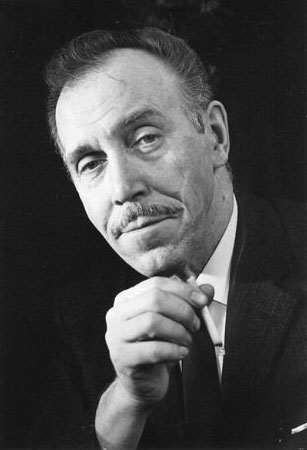
Laaksonen in 1959

Laaksonen's illustrations of leathermen, as exemplified by Kake, significantly influenced the aesthetics of the gay leather subculture. Edward Lucie-Smith has noted that depictions of masculine gay men by Laaksonen "altered the way gay men think about themselves" and "began to elaborate an identity type, with dress and physical attributes" that countered stereotypes of gay men as weak and effeminate. While the archetype of the masculine leatherman biker was well established in both gay and straight culture by the time of Kake's creation (notably in the 1953 film The Wild One starring Marlon Brando, which Laaksonen cites as a direct influence on his artwork), F. Valentine Hooven III argues that "the leatherman as drawn by Tom of Finland" is "the gold standard, at least within the gay community."

Kake has been described by Susanna Paasonen as Laaksonen's "most iconic character," and by Hooven as "the gay world’s most familiar pin-up icon." Editor Dian Hanson describes Kake as "a sort of Johnny Appleseed traveling the world on his motorcycle spreading the seeds of liberated, mutually satisfying, ecstatically explicit gay sex." Hanson argues that the series was an expression of Laaksonen's desire to depict sex between men that was freed from internalized homophobia – Laaksonen himself stated that his goal for his art was to draw "proud men who were happy having sex" – noting how characters in Kake "break the affection barrier" by kissing and caressing each other in addition to performing sexual acts, and that Laaksonen depicts Kake assuming both active and passive roles during sex.

The precise number of copies of Kake that have been printed and sold is unknown. The ambiguity around sales figures for Kake can be owed in part to the large number of unsanctioned and unauthorized books featuring Laaksonen's artwork produced from the 1950s through the 1970s. Some of these books were created by publishers using Laaksonen's unreturned original artwork, while others were created through outright copyright infringement through the photocopying and reproduction of authorized editions. Hooven estimates that twenty percent or more of published works featuring Laaksonen's artwork produced between 1950 and 1979 were created without the consent or knowledge of the artist.

Kake appears in the 2017 film Tom of Finland, where he is portrayed by Niklas Hogner. The character also appears in Tom of Finland, The Musical, a musical first staged by the Turku City Theatre in 2017.
