= Yaoi Press =

American publishing company

Yaoi Press is an independent yaoi comic publisher based in Nevada. Founded in 2004 by publisher Yamila Abraham, the company specializes in Global BL, or yaoi comics originally published outside of Asia. Yaoi Press publishes original OEL manga as well as European yaoi in translation, and features both single volume comics and comic series. As of 2020, Yaoi Press had fifty titles on the market. One of Yaoi Press's early publishing strategies in order to improve the reputation of OEL manga among yaoi fans was to headhunt famous artists of Global BL. In October 2007, Yaoi Press launched a comic book line in order to provide a less expensive option for customers.

Yaoi Press held a fan convention from the 20th to 22nd in 2008 called Yaoi Jamboree, in Phoenix, Arizona. Various manga artists who had previously worked for the company were invited as guests and an art book of submissions by attended were distributed at the convention.

In 2017, Yaoi Press founder Yamila Abraham launched a visual novel company called Y Press Games.

== Graphic novels ==
- Punishment
- Royal Pain
- Kingdom of Selfish Love
- Winter Demon
- Surge
- PINNED!
- Exorcisms and Pogo Sticks
- Yaoi Hentai
- The Aluria Chronicles
- Saihôshi the Guardian
- Desire of the Gods
- Spirit Marked
- Enslaved by the Dragon
- Prisoner of the Immortal
- Zesty!
- IDOL
- Wishing for the Moon
- Yaoi: An Anthology of Boys Love
- Stallion
- Treasure
- Dark Prince
- Cain
- The Lily and the Rose
- ANIMA
- Happy Yaoi Yum Yum
- Bastard King (sequel of Dark Prince)

== Comic books ==
- Yaoi Candy
- Offered to a Demon

== Art books ==
- Reflections: The Artwork of KOSEN
- Dark Dreams: A Dany&Dany Yaoi Art Book
- Yaoi Gothic: An Explicit Sketchbook

== Visual novels ==
- My Magical Demon Lover
- To Trust an Incubus
- Cannibal Lottery
- Morningdew Farms
- Gods of Love
- Mister Versatile
- Alpha Hole Prison

== Artists ==
- Studio Kôsen
- le Perrugine
- M.A Sambre
- Studio Kosaru
- Dany&Dany
- Yamila Abraham
- Yishan Li
- Laura Carboni
