= Winston Leyland =

British-American author and editor (born 1940)

Francis Winston Leyland (born August 29, 1940) is a British-American author and editor. Called "one of the seminal figures in gay publishing" by the San Francisco Sentinel, he was originally ordained a Catholic priest and later graduated from UCLA. He worked for the Los Angeles Times and Gay Sunshine, serving as editor for the latter when it was rebranded as the Gay Sunshine Journal. Under his direction, the Journal was praised by Allen Ginsberg for "its presentation of literary history hitherto kept in the closet by the academies." In 1975, Leyland founded Gay Sunshine Press, the oldest LGBT publishing house in the United States, followed by Leyland Publications in 1984. The two imprints combined have published more than 135 books, and are known for their translations of gay-themed European and Asian literature into English, including works by Vladimir Makanin, Yukio Mishima, and Nikolai Gogol. Leyland also published written erotica, such as Mike Shearer's Great American Gay Porno Novel and collections of reader-supplied true sexual stories edited by Boyd McDonald (Meat, Flesh, Sex, Cum, Juice, Wads and Cream).

Leyland won the Stonewall Book Award in 1980 for his work as editor of Now the Volcano: An Anthology of Latin American Gay Literature. He was nominated for a Lambda Literary Award in 1998, 2000, and 2002, and won it in 1992.
