= Dale Lazarov =

Puerto Rican writer

- Born: Mayagüez, Puerto Rico
- Area: Writer
- Notable works: Sticky, Manly, Nightlife, Good Sports

Dale Lazarov (born in Mayagüez, Puerto Rico) is an openly gay American comics writer and poet. He is known for writing wordless homoerotic short stories and graphic novels. His work has been included in "best of" anthologies featuring erotic comics, and received critical praise. He cites Tom of Finland as an influence on his writing. He lives in Chicago, Illinois.

As a writer and editor, Lazarov began publishing literary short fiction in the 1980s. In 2005, he collaborated with artist Steve MacIsaac on the graphic novel Sticky, his first comics script. It features a series of friendly sexual encounters between masculine men, which Lazarov describes as "slice of life gay comics porn". He wrote it without captions or dialog, both for the tone it set and to facilitate international sales. It was originally serialized in three issues by Eros Comics (an imprint of Fantagraphics). He and MacIsaac produced a new full-color framing sequence for a hardcover collection published by Bruno Gmünder Verlag in March 2006. Since then Lazarov has partnered with multiple artists on graphic novels and short stories in a variety of genres, generally continuing the theme of wordless sex-positive stories. He partnered with Class Comics to publish his work in digital formats.

His short-story collaboration with artist Drubskin, "The Welcome Back Fuck", was featured in Best Gay Erotica 2007 and subsequently in Best of the Best Gay Erotica, both published by Cleis Press. "Everybody's Doin' It!" with artist Jason A. Quest was selected for Cleis' Best Gay Erotica 2014. An episode from Sticky was included in Best Erotic Comics 2008 (Last Gasp).

== Bibliography ==
=== Graphic novels ===
- Sticky with Steve MacIsaac
- Fancy with Delic Van Loond
- Manly with Amy Colburn
- Nightlife with Bastian Jonsson
- Good Sports with Alessio Slominsky
- Greek Love with Adam Graphite
- Fast Friends with Michael Broderick
- Peacock Punks with Mauro Mariotti and Janos Janecki
- Bulldogs with Chas Hunter and Si Arden
- Tapstuds with Dustin Craig
- Timber with Player
- Pardners with Bo Ravel
- Sly with mpMann
- Carnal with TheAmir
- Super Creeps with Bo Ravel

=== Short stories ===
- "The Welcome Back Fuck" with Drubskin
- "Everybody's Doin' It!" with Jason A. Quest
- "Second Chances" with Foxy Andy and William O. Tyler
- "Tuckered" with Janos Janecki
- "Joysticks" with Reinhardt Logan
- "Intimacy" with Martin Chan
