= Robert Gigi =

French cartoonist and archivist

Robert Gigi (29 July 1926 – 3 February 2007) was a French cartoonist, illustrator and archivist.

== Biography ==
Gigi was born in Besançon. He began working in the art studio of Raymond Poïvet while a student. He created his first comic in 1948, calling himself Bob Gigi. Gigi worked for the Paris-Graphic press agency, which was also known as Fabiola. He also worked for the magazines L'Aurore and Les Aventuriers d'Aujourd'hui.

Gigi eventually joined the Société Parisienne d'Édition (SPE) in 1951, remaining until 1980. When he was a part of the Société, his works were published in L'Épatant, Fillette, and Pschitt Adventures. In 1967 Éric Losfeld published his controversial erotic adventure comic Scarlett Dream, a book that shares a lot of similarities with Jean-Claude Forests Barbarella comic book. Gigi started a fantasy series in 1970 called Agar, which was published in Il Corrieri dei Ragazzi. He began to work as a comics teacher at the School of Fine Arts in Angoulême in the 1980s.

In 1991, Gigi retired and began sculpting. After a long illness, he died in 2007 in Puteaux.

== Bibliography ==
- Scarlett Dream - 5 albums in French
- Le sablier vert (in French)
- Captain Fulgur (in French)
- Ugaki (in French)
