= Éric Losfeld =

French publisher (1922–1979)

Éric Losfeld (Mouscron, 9 March 1922 – Paris, 18 November 1979) was a Belgian-born French publisher who had a reputation for publishing controversial material with his publishing imprint Éditions Le Terrain Vague.

He was the publisher of Emmanuelle (1967), two film magazines (Midi Minuit Fantastique and Positif) founded by Ado Kyrou.

He published a series of controversial erotic cult comic books, like Barbarella, created by Jean-Claude Forest, Scarlett Dream by Robert Gigi, Epoxy by Paul Cuvelier and Jean van Hamme, the French edition of Phoebe Zeit-Geist, The Adventures of Jodelle and Pravda, both by Guy Peellaert. In 1967, he also published legendary psychedelic feminist comic book Saga de Xam by Jean Rollin. In 1970, he published Xiris by Serge San Juan and Kris Kool by Caza.

Losfeld's tombstone inscription reads, "Tout ce qu'il éditait avait le souffle de la liberté." ("Everything he edited had the breath of freedom.").
