= Midi Minuit Fantastique =

Midi Minuit Fantastique (1962–1972) was a French film magazine published by Eric Losfeld (publisher of Adonis Kyrou and film magazine Positif). Michel Caen and Alain Le Bris started it, accompanied by Jean Boullet and Jean-Claude Romer. The headquarters of Midi Minuit Fantastique was in Paris.

The magazine was dedicated to the fantastique, horror and science fiction films of the 1960s. It had a guide to the cinemas in Paris that showed films in those genres.

Some Midi Minuit Fantastique issues were dedicated to special themes (King Kong, Dracula, The Most Dangerous Game).

In later days, when acceptance of alternative canons of cinema had grown, Midi Minuit Fantastique sometimes dealt with more mainstream subject matter, publishing profiles on Samuel Fuller, Otto Preminger or Federico Fellini.

Literary fiction was also a subject of Midi Minuit, including an essay on Gaston Leroux by Jean Rollin.

A total of twenty-four issues were produced.

== See also ==
- List of film periodicals

== Sources ==
- René Prédal (1996), Midi-minuit fantastique : étude analytique et sémiologique, Centre du XXe siècle.
