= Blue Shield (character) =

Marvel Comics fictional character

- Blue Shield. Art by Salvador Larroca.

Publication information
- Publisher: Marvel Comics
- First appearance: Dazzler #5 (July 1981)
- Created by: Tom DeFalco; Frank Springer

In-story information
- Alter ego: Joseph Cartelli
- Team affiliations: The Initiative; Project Pegasus
- Abilities: Wears a micro circuitry-lined belt that grants: Force field generation Superhuman physical attributes

The Blue Shield (Joe Cartelli) is a fictional superhero appearing in American comic books published by Marvel Comics.

== Publication history ==
The Blue Shield first appeared in Dazzler #5 (July 1981) and was created by Tom DeFalco and Frank Springer.

The character appeared sporadically through the years since then, having made appearances in Dazzler #14 (April 1982), Contest of Champions #3 (August 1982), Marvel Age Annual #1 (1985), Captain America #352 (April 1989), Quasar #8 (March 1990), Marvel Super Heroes vol. 3 #3 (September 1990), Quasar #51-53 (October–December 1993), #57 (April 1994), The Avengers vol. 3 #6 (July 1998), and The Amazing Spider-Man vol. 2 #550 (February 2008)

Blue Shield received an entry in the original Official Handbook of the Marvel Universe #2, and in the Official Handbook of the Marvel Universe Master Edition #1.

== Fictional character biography ==
Joe Cartelli was born in the Bronx, New York. He is the son of Frank Cartelli, who was gunned down by the mob. He became a crime fighter, and started to infiltrate the Barrigan crime family, masquerading as a mobster. At one point, he somehow acquired a belt with micro-circuitry of unknown origin that could give him the Blue Shield powers and used it to fight his family and various other criminals. He also shortly allied with Dazzler.

Blue Shield was next seen attempting to join the Avengers, but was then approached to become security director for Project Pegasus, a secret research project of the US government. At that point, the abilities once conferred by the belt became innate, with Blue Shield being able to produce the same effects without any visible equipment. He resigned from Project Pegasus after failing to protect the facility from the alien life-form called Omnivore. However, he later re-accepted the post.

=== The Initiative ===
Joseph registered with the Initiative, and was assigned to New York, where he worked alongside Jackpot. While chasing a criminal, he comes across Spider-Man, and considers himself more important, and decides to engage him in an attempt to capture him. Jackpot comments that if he could fly, he would have chased Spider-Man after he jumped on Menace's glider.

== Powers and abilities ==
The Blue Shield from his first appearance in Dazzler #5, artist Frank Springer.

Blue Shield originally wore a micro circuitry-lined belt which artificially enhanced his strength, speed, stamina, agility, reflexes, and reactions, and endurance to near superhuman levels. However, long-term exposure to the belt's field has altered his genetic structure to the point that he possesses superhuman physical abilities innately.

The micro circuitry-lined belt is of both unknown origin and design and grants Blue Shield the ability to generate a powerful force field around himself, greatly increasing his body's resistance to physical injury. While surrounded by the field, Blue Shield can withstand high caliber bullets, powerful impact forces, heat, punctures, and concussion without sustaining injury. The field not only protects him from physical attack but can also filter out harmful gases and protect him from extreme temperature.

Though exposure to the belt over the years has granted him superhuman physical powers, he is not able to generate a protective force field around himself without the use of the belt.
