= The Adventures of Jodelle =

1966 French erotic comic

Jodelle
- Hardcover of the 2013 reissue

Character information
- Created by: Guy Peellaert, Pierre Bartier

In-story information
- Full name: The Adventures of Jodelle
- Formats: Original material for the series has been published as a set of graphic novels.
- Genre: Erotic
- Publication date: 1966

Creative team
- Writer(s): Pierre Bartier
- Artist(s): Guy Peellaert

Reprints
- The series has been reprinted, at least in part, in English.

The Adventures of Jodelle (original title Les Aventures de Jodelle) is a 1966 French erotic comic drawn by Guy Peellaert and scripted by Pierre Bartier. Drawings and screenplay were deeply influenced by pop art. Many of the characters looks were taken from public pop figures of the past and present; Jodelle herself looks like French singer Sylvie Vartan, stereotyped as the girl next door fiancée, while other characters are look-alikes of Emperor Augustus, The Beatles, Pope Paul VI, James Bond, Marquis de Sade, Frank Lloyd Wright's architecture of the Solomon R. Guggenheim Museum, and Jesus Christ. In a Pop version of Imperial Rome, neon ads promote "stripteases and Christian slaughters."

== Influence ==
Jodelle was the first pop art book by Peellaert, followed up by Pravda (never published in English), one year later. Peellaerts comics were published by Éric Losfelds Le Terrain Vague, just like the Barbarella comic. A somewhat likeminded comic book that appeared was Phoebe Zeit-Geist.

== See also ==
- Vanity of vanities, all is vanity
- Tarzoon: Shame of the Jungle
