= Jodelle =

Jodelle may refer to:

== Family name ==
- Étienne Jodelle (1532–1573), French dramatist and poet, was born in Paris of a noble family

== Given name ==
- The Adventures of Jodelle, a 1966 French erotic comic drawn by Guy Peellaert and scripted by Pierre Bartier
- Jodelle Ferland (born 1994), Canadian actress
