= Techmaster =

Techmaster is a fictional character appearing in American comic books published by Marvel Comics. The character first appeared in Dazzler #8 (October 1981).

== Fictional character biography ==
Billy Bitzer was disfigured after being struck by a bolt of lightning and then got cybernetic hands and fought Dazzler.
