= Frank Springer =

American comics artist (1929–2009)

- Frank Springer c. 1975
- Born: December 6, 1929 New York City, U.S.
- Died: April 2, 2009 (aged 79) Damariscotta, Maine, U.S.
- Areas: Penciller, Inker
- Pseudonyms: Francis Hollidge; Bob Monhegan
- Notable works: "The Adventures of Phoebe Zeit-Geist"; Dazzler; Nick Fury, Agent of S.H.I.E.L.D.
- Awards: National Cartoonists Society Reuben Award (1973, 1977, 1981); Inkpot Award (2004)

Frank Springer (December 6, 1929 – April 2, 2009) was an American comics artist best known for Marvel Comics' Dazzler and Nick Fury, Agent of S.H.I.E.L.D.. As well, in collaboration with writer Michael O'Donoghue, Springer created one of the first adult-oriented comics features on American newsstands: "The Adventures of Phoebe Zeit-Geist" in the magazine Evergreen Review. A multiple winner of the National Cartoonists Society's Reuben Award, Springer was a president of the Society and a founding member of the Berndt Toast Gang, its Long Island chapter.

== Biography ==
=== Early life and career ===
Frank Springer was born in the Jamaica neighborhood of the New York City borough of Queens, and moved with his family to nearby Nassau County, Long Island when he was nearly 10 years old. He graduated from Malverne High School in Malverne, New York, in 1948. He had one sibling, a sister, who predeceased him. Springer, whose art influences included adventure comic strips and magazine-cover illustrations by Norman Rockwell, Dean Cornwell, and J. C. Leyendecker, went on to earn an art degree from Syracuse University in 1952, and after being drafted that year, served with the U.S. Army through 1954. Stationed at Fort Dix, he spent his service, he said, "drawing pictures, drawing charts and that kind of thing. ... I got a lot of training in the army in doing sports cartoons with a deadline and so on." Following his discharge, he began freelancing in New York City, soon becoming assistant to cartoonist George Wunder on the comic strip Terry and the Pirates, on which Wunder had succeeded creator Milt Caniff. Springer recalled in 2008,

I was essentially a line artist and it was through one of the freelance jobs that I learnt that George Wunder, who wrote and drew Terry and the Pirates, was looking for an assistant and I was given his number. I called him up, was hired and I stayed there for five years doing some backgrounds and foregrounds, answering his mail, coloring the Sunday strips. That was good training, watching a professional churning this stuff out, day after day, writing the synopsis, then writing the strips and so on. I loved the strips when I was growing up. I grew up on Terry and the Pirates, Flash Gordon and Prince Valiant; those were the main adventure ones. There were a lot of adventure strips at that time, Buck Rogers, Smilin’ Jack and all of that, so I leaned toward all of that rather than the gag cartoons.

Leaving in 1960 to freelance again, Springer entered the comic-book industry two years later to draw Dell Comics' Brain Boy, starring a telepathic government agent, in Four Color Comics #1330 (June 1962). Springer drew the spin-off series' five-issue run of #2-6 (Sept. 1962 - Nov. 1963).

=== Silver Age comics ===
During the remainder of the 1960s and early 1970s period fans and historians call the Silver Age of comic books, Springer became a prolific penciler-inker across much of Dell's line, drawing issues of Ghost Stories, Movie Classic, Tales from the Tomb, Toka: Jungle King, and the movie/TV tie-in series The Big Valley, Charlie Chan, Iron Horse and The New People, among other comics.

Secret Six #1 (May 1968), art by Springer. Unusually, the story begins on the cover.

He debuted at DC Comics with two comics the same month: penciling Batman #197, and both penciling and inking the lead feature, "Dial H for Hero", in House of Mystery #171 (both Dec. 1967). Springer went on to draw an issue each of Detective Comics and Our Army at War; an anthological story in another House of Mystery; and the first two issues of Secret Six — the initial one a rare example of a comic-book beginning its story on the cover rather than on the inside page one.

After that, he found more regular work at rival Marvel Comics, where he debuted on Nick Fury, Agent of S.H.I.E.L.D. #4 (Sept. 1968), a fill-in issue of writer-artist Jim Steranko's signature series. Springer penciled and inked an origin-story retelling (scripted by Roy Thomas) sandwiched between Steranko's final two issues. Springer then succeeded the departed Steranko, drawing issues #6-11 (Nov. 1968 - April 1969), with Steranko providing the covers of #6-7.

Springer additionally drew Captain Marvel #13-14 (May–June 1969) and a Hercules back-up story in Ka-Zar #1 (Aug. 1970) before concentrating on his ongoing Dell work until 1973, when that company ceased publication.

=== Later comic books ===
Springer returned to draw a handful of stories for Marvel's black-and-white horror-comics magazines in 1974 and 1975, and then sprang from title to title, penciling sporadic issues of The Avengers, Captain America, The Spectacular Spider-Man, and Spider-Woman, among others, and also inked many Marvel and DC comics.

He then became regular inker of Marvel's The Savage She-Hulk over penciler Mike Vosburg on issues #10-22 (Nov. 1980 - Nov. 1981). He penciled a longer run of the superheroine series Dazzler from #4-31 and 35 (June 1981 - March 1984 and Jan. 1985), plus the Dazzler stories in What If...? #34 (Aug. 1982) and Marvel Graphic Novel #12 (1984). Springer, additionally, wrote Dazzler #27-28 and co-wrote with Jim Shooter #29 (July–Nov. 1983).

Springer's other 1980s comics include issues of Marvel's Conan the Barbarian and the company's toy-license titles based on the properties G.I. Joe and Transformers; and, for DC, a return to the Secret Six in Action Comics Weekly, and issues of Manhunter and Green Arrow. After a brief hiatus from comics, he returned to co-ink, with Michael Weaver, Claypool Comics' Phantom of Fear City #11-12 (Feb. and May 1995). This was his last confirmed work in comics except for a single-page profile of the DC character Perry White in Superman Secret Files #1 (Jan. 1998).

Miscellanea includes the Atlas/Seaboard series Cougar in the 1970s, and Continuity Comics' Armor in the 1990s.

=== Adult satire ===
Panels from "The Adventures of Phoebe Zeit-Geist" by Springer and writer Michael O'Donoghue.

With the dark-humor writer-provocateur Michael O'Donoghue, Springer from 1965 to 1966 drew "The Adventures of Phoebe Zeit-Geist" in the magazine Evergreen Review. The feature was one of the first mature-audience comics in the U.S., following the French feature "Barbarella" in Evergreen Review in 1965. Others in the vein included Playboy's "Little Annie Fanny" and Magazine Enterprises' "The Adventures of Pussycat". Unlike its innocently bawdy contemporaries, "Phoebe Zeit-Geist" had a darker, sometimes brutal edge, with scenes of bondage depicted as actual torture rather than Bettie Page-like playfulness. Evergreen Review publisher Grove Press collected the series as a 1968 book.

Doonesbury comic-strip creator Garry Trudeau cited the strip as an early inspiration, saying, "[A] very heavy influence was a serial in the Sixties called 'Phoebe Zeitgeist'. ... It was an absolutely brilliant, deadpan send-up of adventure comics, but with a very edgy, modernist kind of approach. To this day, I hold virtually every panel in my brain. It's very hard not to steal from it."

Springer also drew the series "Frank Fleet" for Evergreen Review from 1969 to 1970. From 1971 to 1988 he was a regular contributor to the satiric magazine National Lampoon, occasionally using the pseudonyms Francis Hollidge and Bob Monhegan. He came to National Lampoon, he recalled, through O’Donoghue, who had joined the magazine "and called me up almost right away to do a piece called 'Tarzan of the Cows'. I don’t know what issue it was in, but it was one of the earlier ones. I did several other pieces for the magazine and I worked with several of the other writers, Henry Beard, Doug Kenney, Brian McConnachie; all fabulous writers. These guys were really funny and I think I did some of my best work because the writing was so good."

=== Comic strips and cartoons ===
After having assisted Wunder on Terry and the Pirates from 1955 to 1960 and then moving to comic books, Springer returned to comic strips as penciler of the syndicated newspaper strip Rex Morgan, M.D. from 1979 to 1981. He also drew The Incredible Hulk newspaper strip, starring the Marvel Comics' antihero; the romance strip The Virtue of Vera Valiant, with writer Stan Lee; and The Adventures of Hedley Kase in the 1990s. Springer's cartoon art has appeared in Games Magazine, Muppets Magazine, the New York Daily News, Playboy, Sports Illustrated for Kids, and elsewhere.

In the mid-1960s, he did freelance work on the animated TV series Space Ghost, collaborating with a partner to produce "key drawings" of action for which "in-betweener" animators did connecting art. "It was part-time stuff, but that was enjoyable. It was a different phase of cartooning," Springer recalled.

Springer also did a small amount of uncredited penciling on the comic strip The Phantom, assisting Sy Barry, and "for a really brief period" worked with writer-artist Stan Drake on The Heart of Juliet Jones. Without mentioning the strip's name, Springer said in the mid-2000s that, "I worked with Leonard Starr for some years doing part of that strip," presumably Starrs' On Stage, later titled Mary Perkins, On Stage. "Leonard always handled the figures but I’d come in once a week and do the backgrounds, pick up a check and leave." He additionally did uncredited work on the comic strip Friday Foster, drawn in Spain by Jorge Longarón. "I knew the [strip's] writer [Jim Lawrence], who lived here in New Jersey, ... [and] I got a call a couple of times from Lawrence who said they hadn’t gotten the material through from Spain" and Springer was asked to fill in. "I guess over the years I did two Sunday pages, maybe three."

=== Later years and death ===
In 1980, just shy of his 51st birthday, Springer ran the New York City Marathon. In 1995, after spending the majority of his life on Long Island (mostly in the towns of Lynbrook, Massapequa Park, and Greenlawn), Springer and wife Barbara, whom he married in c. 1956-1957, moved to Maine, where the artist turned to oil painting. He said in 2004, "There were some raggedy times, but I always had work, raised five kids, bought some houses, bought some cars. ... I've been lucky".

Springer at one point was president of the National Cartoonists Society, and was a founding member of the Berndt Toast Gang, its Long Island chapter.

Springer died on April 2, 2009, at his home in Damariscotta, Maine, of prostate cancer. He was survived by his wife and five grown children: Barbara Edwards, Bill Springer, Jennifer Dills, Jon Springer, and Christopher Springer. Characterizing Springer, Archie comics artist Stan Goldberg said, "Very few people could surpass him as an artist, as a gentleman, and as a true gentleman in my field. ... When you see a Frank Springer job, you know it's going to be the best job in the world".

== Awards ==
- National Cartoonists Society Reuben Award — Comic Books (Story): 1973, 1977, and 1981
- Inkpot Award: 2004

Preceded by Jim Steranko	Nick Fury, Agent of S.H.I.E.L.D. artist 1968–1969	Succeeded by Barry Windsor-Smith
Preceded by Vince Colletta	The Invaders inker 1976–1978	Succeeded by Chic Stone
Preceded by Chic Stone	The Savage She-Hulk inker 1980–1981	Succeeded by Al Milgrom
Preceded by John Romita Jr.	Dazzler artist 1981–1985	Succeeded by Mark D. Bright
Preceded by Danny Fingeroth	Dazzler writer 1983	Succeeded by Jim Shooter
