= Dazzler (Marvel Comics) =

Marvel Comics fictional character

- Dazzler taken from the top left corner box art of Dazzler (vol.1) comic book series Art by John Romita Jr.

Publication information
- Publisher: Marvel Comics
- First appearance: The Uncanny X-Men #130 (February 1980)
- Created by: Tom DeFalco; John Romita Jr.

In-story information
- Alter ego: Alison "Ali" Blaire
- Species: Human mutant
- Team affiliations: Gladiators; New Excalibur; The 198; S.H.I.E.L.D.; X-Men; Wildways Rebellion; A-Force; Heralds of Galactus
- Notable aliases: The Disco Dazzler
- Abilities: Ability to convert sound into light of various forms and intensity; Polarizing eyes preventing blindness and dazzlement from light

Dazzler (Alison "Ali" Blaire) is a superheroine appearing in American comic books published by Marvel Comics, often in association with the X-Men. She first appeared in Uncanny X-Men #130 (February 1980).

A mutant with the ability to convert sound vibrations into light and energy beams, Dazzler was developed as a cross-promotional, multi-media creation between Casablanca Records and Marvel Comics until the tie-ins were dropped in 1980. A committee of Marvel staff, principally writer/editor Tom DeFalco and illustrator John Romita Jr., created the character. She starred in a self-titled series in the early 1980s which lasted forty-two issues, a Marvel Graphic Novel titled Dazzler: The Movie, a four-issue limited series co-starring Beast titled Beauty and the Beast, and later joined the cast of Uncanny X-Men. She has also featured in other Marvel teams.

The character is considered a gay icon due to LGBT readers, particularly gay men, enjoying her disco aesthetic, popstar stage persona, and strong-willed characterization.

Halston Sage portrays Dazzler in Dark Phoenix.

== Publication history ==
=== Creation and development ===
Dazzler was conceived in early 1979 as a joint venture between Marvel Comics and Casablanca Records, a subsidiary of Universal Music Group that had achieved considerable success with notable disco acts including Donna Summer and Village People. Accounts differ as to which party made the first move; in 1986 Louise Simonson would tell Amazing Heroes that Casablanca approached Marvel; however, in a 2011 blog post Jim Shooter would credit the idea to Marvel employee Alice Donenfeld and based on the success of The Archies, who later pitched it to Casablanca supremo Neil Bogart. Bogart was enthusiastic, not only wanting to produce music 'by' the character (who initially had the working name of 'Disco Queen') but also launch it with a half-hour animated special featuring numerous Marvel characters. Marvel began shaping the character; Shooter assigned the development to Tom DeFalco (who, like Shooter, had experience working at Archie Comics), Roger Stern, Roberta 'Dickie' Mackenzie and John Romita Jr. while continuing to oversee the project himself. Shooter recalled that DeFalco pitched the name 'Evelyn Free' (a pun on "evil and free") for the character's civilian identity before the group decided on Alison Blaire. At this stage much about the character was in flux; Romita Jr. initially designed her as African American, heavily based on singer/actress Grace Jones with a costume inspired by the skin-tight and revealing eveningwear he had seen on women at New York nightclubs; her name was changed, first to Disco Dazzler and then to simply Dazzler at the suggestion of Stern; and initially her powers were to be an ability to make people tell the truth. DeFalco objected to the latter, feeling it was "not very interesting for a comic book". Instead he successfully suggested that as her name was Dazzler light-based powers made more sense. Casablanca held final approval over the character at this stage, and vetoed some of Marvel's ideas. DeFalco would recall that the numerous delays led the creative team to believe disco "would be dead" before Dazzler's debut as the various parties hammered out the initial story, which DeFalco and Romita turned into an origin story

Meanwhile, the multimedia side of the project changed several times. Shooter had produced a pitch for the TV special that had impressed Bogart so much he wanted to turn it into a live-action special with many stars he had under contract (including Cher, Donna Summer, Kiss, Lenny and Squiggy, Robin Williams and the Village People) to appear as Marvel characters. However, soon afterwards Casablanca struck financial trouble, and Bogart was forced out of the company. Instead filmmaker John Derek showed interest in Dazzler as a potential film vehicle for his wife Bo, who were looking to build on the success of 10 with studio Filmworks. As such the comic character was redesigned to more closely resemble Derek herself, becoming a white blonde, requiring Romita Jr. to redraw the work already done on the comic. The artist was unimpressed with the changes to the lead character. According to DeFalco, the Dereks' involvement in the project ended after the poor reception of their vehicle Tarzan, the Ape Man

Marvel had planned to release the 34-page Dazzler comic as part of the Marvel Comics Super Special series, which generally dealt with media adaptations, while some thought was also given to releasing it as a black-and-white magazine. After Casablanca and Filmworks both withdrew, Marvel shipped the concept around other record labels and film studios without success. While this was happening, Dazzler had appeared in other titles to build anticipation.

=== 1980s ===
The character debuted in Uncanny X-Men #130 (dated February 1980) as an ally of the X-Men, and subsequently guested in issues of Amazing Spider-Man (#203, April 1980) and Fantastic Four (#217, April 1980). Due to the character still being in flux while these issues were produced they featured some inconsistencies - Richard Gagnon of Amazing Heroes noted the character was considerably more streetwise in her X-Men appearance than she would be for most of her subsequent appearances, while in the Spider-Man guest spot Dazzler fired beams from her eyes due to DeFalco having to tell Marv Wolfman to simply take pot luck over which of the three potential variations in powers Casablanca were mulling over at the time would be finalised.

Cover of the first issue of the 1981 comic book series. Art by Bob Larkin.

Rather than throwing away the earlier material, Shooter decided to repackage it as an ongoing comic series. DeFalco would write additional exposition and other material to turn the 34-page one-shot into two 22-page single issues. As Romita Jr. had moved on to other projects an uncredited Walt Simonson provided the art for the new pages. In order to make the debut still something of an event, Shooter decided it would be Marvel's first ongoing series that was exclusive to the direct market - i.e. sold only to specialist comic stores, rather than also to newsstands - a model used by several smaller independent publishers. This also made the comic non-returnable for retailers. Given a healthy promotional push, the first issue - dated May 1981 - was a resounding commercial success for Marvel, with around 400,000 copies sold to stores - around double the number of most of the company's best-selling titles.

With the Romita Jr. material running out midway through the third issue (which also featured work from Alan Kupperberg), Frank Springer became the title's new regular artist. The first issues contained a plethora of Marvel's finest as guest stars as a legacy of the book's origin as a one-off special, and the pattern was kept up for the early issues of the title to support the new character's sales - Dazzler #3-4 featured Doctor Doom; #6-7 guest-starred Hulk; #9 saw an appearance by Quasar; and #10-11 saw Dazzler cross paths with Galactus. Some of these appearances drew criticism due to the unsubtle way many of Marvel's established heroes were in awe of the newcomer. After issue 6 DeFalco left the title, partly due to his growing editorial commitments at Marvel and partly because he was disagreeing over the direction of the series with Springer, who wanted to draw more on romance comics than traditional superhero fare. Dazzler #8 also saw another talent added to the book, with Bill Sienkiewicz contributing the first of what would be a number of covers for the series.

DeFalco's replacement was relative newcomer Danny Fingeroth, initially working from his predecessor's outlines. Fingeroth would also write Dazzler's first appearance in alternative universe anthology title What If, contributing a story that was based on the Galactus storyline from Dazzler #10-11. Issue #17 saw the start of a short stint by the X-Men team-member Angel as a suitor; Fingeroth would admit this was an attempt to draw readers to the series, which had not kept up its early sales. As with other guest appearances, Angel's behaviour in his Dazzler appearances drew mixed responses, with Gagnon describing him as "boorish". Dazzler #20 introduced the villains Doctor Sax and Johnny Guitar, named by Fingeroth after the Jack Kerouac book and the Nicholas Ray film respectively, while #21 was an extra-sized issue exploring the fates of Alison's parents; Fingeroth felt such human interest was an important part of a superhero series' appeal to readers. It also featured another unusual attempt to make the title stand out - a photo cover of model June McDonald posing as Dazzler. The following issue saw Fingeroth also leave the title; Springer briefly wrote and drew the title, before scripts by Shooter and Ken McDonald. Despite a change of direction that saw Dazzler change from a singer in New York to an aspiring actress in Los Angeles (which also saw the much-derided original costume finally dropped for a series of leotards) the series' fortunes failed to improve, and from #31 the title switched to bi-monthly publication. Dazzler #32 saw Mike Carlin take over for an ultimately short stint as writer, and shortly afterwards Geof Isherwood started art duties on the title.

In an attempt to draw more attention to the series Shooter, Springer and Vince Colletta created Dazzler the Movie, the twelfth entry in the Marvel Graphic Novel series; the story publicly outed Alison as a mutant, a development that would drive subsequent issues. It did little to boost sales, and Gagnon would later call Dazzler the Movie "the most extravagant waste of the graphic novel format to date". In the regular series, Dazzler #33 featured a Sienkiewicz cover closely referencing Michael Jackson's hugely popular Thriller music video, and cameos by long-dormant Marvel humour characters Millie the Model and Chili Storm.

Another attempt to find an audience came with the spin-off mini-series Beauty and the Beast, pairing Dazzler with the popular Hank McCoy, at the time a member of the Defenders. The series was written by Ann Nocenti, and along with Louise Simonson's Power Pack and Trina Robbins' fashion comic Misty was an attempt by Marvel to find the female audience the publisher had lost over the previous decade. To this end Nocenti attempted to write Beauty and the Beast as a romance comic, though she would later reflect it was a "tough assignment" pairing a "blonde airhead" with a "deep intellectual".

Dazzler's redesigned costume's debut, from Dazzler #38 (July 1985). Art by Paul Chadwick.

Dazzler #38 saw another new direction, with the popular Archie Goodwin as writer and Paul Chadwick as artist. Goodwin redesigned the character's costume and planned to return the series to superheroics rather than personal and showbiz drama. He would later admit he took the Dazzler series on as no-one else wanted it and he needed work at the time. Chadwick had caught Goodwin's eye after pitching his creator-owned series Concrete when the latter was an Epic Comics editor. Goodwin also introduced bounty hunter O. Z. Chase to the series as a supporting character. The relaunch attracted a mild improvement in critical response, but following Dazzler #40 (which tied into the Secret Wars II crossover) Goodwin and Chadwick were told the series would be ending after two further issues due to poor sales, ending after #42 (dated March 1986). While sanguine about his experiences on the book, Chadwick would later note the modifications to the cover of the final issue - which saw another artist add the Beast to his original work - was a factor in his decision to return to launching Concrete rather than to continue working with Marvel.

At the time the series was not greatly mourned; reviewing the final issue of the series for Amazing Heroes, R. A. Jones felt Dazzler would "not be missed" and criticized its lack of success across several genres - though also expressed that the book might have been more successful if Goodwin and Chadwick had arrived earlier. Shortly afterwards in the same publication, Richard Gagnon described it as "easily one of the worst comics that Marvel Comics Group has ever put out".

Retrospective reviews have been kinder, however. Angelo Delos Trinos of CBR.com ranked the Dazzler comic book series 5th in their "10 Times Comics Changed The World" list, writing, "The '80s were some of comics' most profitable years, and this was thanks in part to the growing speculator market. Publishers were already moving away from young readers to adults who treated comics more as an investment than populist entertainment. They finalized this shift after Dazzler #1, by Tom Defalco, John Romita Senior and Junior, John Buscema, Alfredo Alcala, Bob McCleod, and Glynis Wein became a blockbuster."

Following the cancellation of Dazzler, the character was considered as a possible founding member of X-Factor, but the decision to resurrect Jean Grey put that idea aside. Instead, Dazzler would find a home in the pages of Uncanny X-Men, still under the aegis of Chris Claremont - who had scripted the character's debut appearance. In-universe, Dazzler had twice turned down membership of the X-Men before finally joining the team from Uncanny X-Men #214 (dated February 1987) and would go on to be a member of the team until #248 (September 1989), when she was effectively written out after travelling through the Siege Perilous and losing her memory.

=== 1990s and after ===
Subsequently, Dazzler made only occasional appearances between 1990 and 2005, before returning to regularly featuring in monthly publication for the first time in 15 years when she joined the cast of New Excalibur. New Excalibur also saw Dazzler gain the power of being able to instantly resurrect herself, a development that was effectively forgotten about soon afterwards. After the title was canceled, Dazzler was brought back as a supporting character in Uncanny X-Men written by Matt Fraction.

In February 2010, Marvel published a one-shot Dazzler special by writer Jim McCann and artist Kalman Andrasofszky as part of the Women of Marvel series. According to Diamond Comic Distributors, the special was the 115th best selling comic book of May 2010. Doug Zawisza of CBR.com called Dazzler #1 a ""Greatest Hits" comic album of Dazzler's best material", while Bryan Joel of IGN, calling the character "a great candidate to show off the themes central to the "Women of Marvel" drive."

The 2012 series X-Treme X-Men featured Dazzler as the leader of a dimension-hopping X-Men team, and later that year she appeared Uncanny X-Men as an agent of superspy outfit S.H.I.E.L.D. Beginning in May 2015, Dazzler appeared as one of the main characters in A-Force, an all-female Avengers launched by G. Willow Wilson, Marguerite Bennett, and Jorge Molina during Marvel's "Secret Wars" storyline.

2018 saw the character feature in another starring one-shot, Dazzler: X-Song. The issue was the 100th best selling comic book in June 2018. and received positive reviews, with Mike Fugere of CBR.com referring to it as "the most important X-story Marvel has published in years", noting "Maybe Dazzler isn't the beckon [sic] of social progress we were looking for, but it seems she has become the one we have." Joshua Davison of Bleeding Cool stated, "'Dazzler: X-Song #1 is an excellent self-contained story centering around the ever-lovable Allison Blaire of the X-Men. The themes are interesting, the characters that are supposed to be likable succeed in being so, and the art looks great."

== Fictional character biography ==
=== Early life ===
Alison Blaire was born in Gardendale, New York to Carter Blaire and Katherine Blaire. Her mutant powers first manifest when she is in junior high school. An aspiring singer, she volunteers to perform at her school dance when her light-generating abilities first appear. Everyone at the dance assumes it is a technologically generated special effect, an assumption commonly made before she reveals herself to be a mutant later in her life.

=== Becoming Dazzler ===
Using the stage name "Dazzler", Alison sets out to make a name for herself in the music industry, using her light powers and dancing ability to enhance her performances. It is at one of her shows that Alison first meets the X-Men while they are attacked by the forces of the Hellfire Club. Angry at the interruption of her show, Alison lashes out in anger at the Hellfire intruders, unintentionally making one member catatonic. Alison subsequently aids the X-Men in finding Kitty Pryde. She had always assumed that life as a disco queen would be exciting but finds the fight with the X-Men's enemies going a bit too far, and turns down their offer to join the team.

Dazzler hid her status as a mutant from all but those closest to her. After acquainting herself with the various Marvel Comics superheroes, Alison finds herself continually using her abilities to fight both ordinary criminals and rogue superhumans—often at the expense of her career ambitions. On one occasion, she meets Spider-Man, teaming up against the Lightmaster. She later battled the Enchantress, is overwhelmed by Doctor Doom, the Absorbing Man and then fights off Nightmare. She briefly allied with the hero Blue Shield, and aids the X-Men and Spider-Woman against the misguided Caliban. On another occasion, she battles and defeats the Hulk, and establishes a long-standing feud with the then-mentally unstable Rogue. She fights against the cybernetic Techmaster. She also has a romantic affair with Warren Worthington III. In the course of her inadvertent adventures, she even encounters the planet-devouring Galactus, who initially thought she was of little import and generally ignores her. Nevertheless, Galactus temporarily endowed her with cosmic energy so she can retrieve the herald Terrax. Alison was also asked to audition for a place in the Avengers; she declined, saying that the superhero life was of no interest to her.

=== Moving to Los Angeles ===
Dazzler moved to Los Angeles in a fruitless attempt to help her half-sister Lois London, who has the mutant power to kill anyone with a touch, but has little to no control over the ability. While in Los Angeles, Alison attempts careers in fitness training, dancing, modeling, and acting. Influenced both by her lover Roman Nekoboh and her desire to abate the growing anti-mutant sentiment, Alison publicly declared her mutant identity soon afterwards. The revelation backfired, destroying her reputation and career and inflaming anti-mutant sentiment - also sending Alison into a depressive state. Forced into hiding, she spent some time as a keyboard player and back-up vocalist in fellow mutant singer Lila Cheney's band. A covert anti-mutant army unit accidentally transformed one of its own members, a latent mutant named Zalme, into a creature called Dinosaur Man, who attacked Dazzler.

=== Joining the X-Men ===
While on tour, the band's plane crashed and they were rescued by Cannonball and Joshua Guthrie. Lila had been knocked out, so Dazzler used the music Joshua plays at the scene to blast a hole through the wreckage. She was later possessed by the psychic mutant Malice; after an encounter with the X-Men coming to warn her about the Marauders, Dazzler was freed from possession and became a member of the team. During her tenure with the X-Men, Dazzler received training, attains greater control over her powers, and develops a romance with the extra-dimensional Longshot. She was also forced to work alongside the now-reformed Rogue, which caused tension between them at first. Over time, Alison eventually found Rogue to be genuinely remorseful and forgave her teammate. Eventually she and her teammates in the X-Men enter the mystical Siege Perilous.

=== Amnesia and Mojoworld ===
Discovered in an amnesiac state washed up on a beach by her former bodyguard Guido, she was nursed back to health by Guido and Lila, though their efforts prove unsuccessful in helping restore her memory. Her memory was eventually restored when she was found by Longshot some time later. Devastated by the loss of her career in the interim, Alison ventured to Longshot's native dimension Mojoworld, joining her lover and Lila in rebellion against the tyrant Mojo.

Alison's life on Mojoworld was fraught; she suffered an apparent miscarriage and the apparent corruption of the X-Babies before returning to Earth without Longshot. Despite this, Dazzler helped Jean Grey fight against Magneto on Genosha. She and Jean lead a small band of mutants to back up Cyclops and Wolverine. She was apparently incinerated by Magneto, but was actually alive and well, having used a hard-light hologram of herself to distract Magneto while they recovered Professor X After returning to Westchester, the X-Men offered Alison help, but she declined and left the mansion.

Many years later, Shatterstar and Rictor encountered a past-version of Dazzler while time-traveling through Mojoworld. At this point in her life, Dazzler and Longshot were still married and active in the revolt against Mojo. Rictor discovered Dazzler just as she was about to give birth to the child that had been believed to result in a miscarriage. The surviving infant was revealed to be Shatterstar, resolving speculation that Shatterstar actually was the biological child of Dazzler and Longshot. Exhausted from her ordeal, Dazzler passed out, and Shatterstar revealed the necessity of wiping both her and Longshot's memories of the event, and taking his infant self a century into Mojoworld's future, to be raised as a warrior away from his birth parents.

=== New Excalibur ===
Dazzler later re-established her musical career by marketing her original, signature disco image as part of the Techno/Trance genre. Alison moved her career abroad to England and joined with X-Men allies such as the Juggernaut and Captain Britain. Later she was reunited with Longshot, although he was suffering from amnesia and did not remember her, though he later regained his feelings for her and some of his memories. Longshot left the Exiles to re-establish a relationship with Dazzler but they soon parted ways, due in part to Dazzler's frustration with other women's attraction to Longshot and the realization that Longshot is no longer the man she loved.

=== Return to the X-Men ===
Alison subsequently re-joined the X-Men in San Francisco while continuing her revived musical career. Later she took part in the fight against the Skrull invasion of Earth. After a night of drinking with team-mates Northstar and Pixie, Dazzler came under attack by the Sisterhood. In retaliation, she later accompanied Emma Frost, Storm and Karma in an attack on the Sisterhood in San Francisco, where she engaged a mind controlled Psylocke in battle. While Psylocke gained the upper hand, Dazzler absorbed all the sound from the city outside, which she turned into a beam of light that burnt the right side of Psylocke's face off. After the Sisterhood retreated, Dazzler is happily reunited with Psylocke after she regained control.

Along with Gambit, Anole, Northstar, Cannonball, Pixie and Trance, Dazzler traveled to Limbo to rescue Magik. However, they were overwhelmed by the demons. She was rescued by Northstar but they come under attack from a possessed Gambit, who turns her into a state much like Gambit's Death persona. They eventually infected the other X-Men in Limbo They were freed thanks to Magik's Soulsword.

During the Schism between Cyclops and Wolverine, Dazzler chose to remain in San Francisco with Cyclops's side. Dazzler was then asked to lead a "Street Team" of X-Men, to which she agreed. As a result, she worked alongside Boom Boom and Lifeguard.

Dazzler was later summoned to Utopia to help Cyclops and Danger with a Ghost Box; when opened it showed several alternate reality X-Men fighting an evil version of Professor X. She subsequently gets sucked through a portal and is whisked away from Earth-616, narrowly avoiding the conflict between the X-Men and the Avengers. She becomes team leader after Emmeline Frost opts to stay on a world where mutants are gods. Dazzler was later reunited with former teammate Sage when she tried to rescue a child version of Nightcrawler. Her leadership skills and abilities impressed both Cyclops and Wolverine, the latter of whom offered her a position at the Jean Grey School, believing she would be an invaluable resource to the students. Reluctant to accept the invitation after having spent a year traversing and saving the multiverse as well as witnessing the death of some of her friends, Dazzler opted instead to make a decision at a later time; Wolverine advises the offer still stands and to contact when she figures things out.

Instead, in an attempt to better understand the mutant community and Cyclops's talk of mutant revolution, Maria Hill personally asked Dazzler to become an agent of S.H.I.E.L.D., a proposition Alison accepts. However, soon after her first mission Dazzler was poisoned and replaced by the shapeshifter Mystique. Dazzler was later rescued by Magneto, and joined Cyclops's Uncanny X-Men team.

=== A-Force ===
While participating in a roller derby in Miami, Dazzler was approached by Singularity, She-Hulk, Captain Marvel, Nico Minoru and Medusa to help them defeat Antimatter, since they required a powerful light source to defeat their foe. They attempted to negotiate with Antimatter but Dazzler was critically injured and died on the operating table. She woke up following the failed operation to realize it seemed like she was unable to die, and rejoined the fight against Antimatter in time to take Singularity into a pocket dimension to protect her from dying when Antimatter was destroyed. Singularity sensed something else had broken through into their universe; teleporting to Astoria, Oregon they found the dimension-hoppers were Dazzler Thor - an alternate version of Dazzler from Battleworld - and her opponent Countess. The Countess vanished following her defeat and A-Force took Dazzler Thor to get "ale" and Nico convinced Dazzler to talk to Dazzler Thor. Dazzler revealed to her alternate self that she had accidentally come into contact with Terrigen Mist and contracted M-Pox, which sterilizes and kills mutants. Dazzler woke up alongside the rest of A-Force and Dazzler Thor in a jail cell, without any powers. Nico appeared under the mind control and was made to send She-Hulk into a murderous rage, but they used this to escape. A-Force attacked the Countess; Dazzler Thor used a hologram to get close to the Countess, who attacked and injured her. Dazzler picked up Light Bringer to defend her. After the battle, Dazzler Thor died from the M-Pox. Dazzler revealed to the rest of A-Force she also had the disease and left behind Light Bringer in respect for her fallen alternate self.

During the second superhero Civil War, Dazzler went with Captain Marvel to fight Thanos; She-Hulk was seriously injured in the fight. Shortly afterwards, Ulysses predicted that Nico would murder an innocent woman named Alice. Dazzler disagreed with Captain Marvel, who wanted to pre-emptively arrest her team-mate, and warned Nico when she arrived. Nico escaped, with Dazzler and Singularity opposing Captain Marvel and Medusa's decision to hunt her down. They followed the pair to Arizona, where Nico is hiding with Elsa Bloodstone and find it overrun by an infection turning people into a swarm of giant bugs. After a brief confrontation when the rest of A-Force find Nico they split into two teams: one to find Alice and the other to protect the civilians. While searching for Alice in an abandoned mine, Danvers, Nico, and Bloodstone are attacked by a giant bug. The bug incapacitates Danvers and Bloodstone before telepathically communicating to Nico, that she is Alice and has been inadvertently infecting the townspeople after her transformation. Alice tells Nico that killing her is the only way to save the people. When Nico refuses, an infected Bloodstone threatens to kill Danvers. Medusa, Singularity, and an infected Dazzler are overrun by bugs and regroup with the others just as Bloodstone infects Danvers. After Dazzler infects Medusa, Nico casts a spell to transform Alice back into a human but it does not cure the rest of the populace. Alice explains that she must be killed and Nico reluctantly casts a death spell on Alice which transforms the infected back into humans. Alice then remerges in her final form and tells A-Force that she is no longer a threat as she now has greater control of her powers.

=== Inhumans vs. X-Men ===
During the war between the X-Men and the Inhumans, Dazzler assisted Emma Frost in the beginning of her plot to defeat the Inhumans, disguising herself as an Inhuman performer shortly before ambushing Black Bolt in his own Quiet Room.

=== Residing on Krakoa ===
Dazzler later becomes a citizen of Krakoa. After Krakoa is attacked by Orchis and leaves Earth for the White Hot Room, Dazzler returns to her career as a singer.

== Powers and abilities ==
Dazzler is a mutant with the ability to transduce sonic vibrations which reach her body into various types of light. This ability seems to operate over a great range of frequencies, including the audible spectrum, and a great variation of sound pressure levels regardless of the complexity, dissonance, or randomness of the sound. Sounds as different as a car crash and a symphonic passage both produce convertible incoming acoustic vibrations. Dazzler prefers utilizing the sound of music, particularly that which is rhythmically sustained. Not only is music more pleasant to her ears, but the steady beat of contemporary music provides a more constant source of sound to convert. Dazzler has been shown to create a "null space" of sound in a certain radius of her person, as a result of "pulling" the sound in her area to her person, to either protect a crowd of people or to supercharge her power reserves.

Left undirected, Dazzler's light will radiate from her body in all directions, producing regular flashes of white light. By conscious control over the light she produces, she can control its direction, frequency (color), amplitude (intensity), and duration. Her mutant ability can produce numerous other effects. She can create simple patterns out of rays of light or combinations of patterns which produce trance-like effects in her targets. She can create a pulse of light on the order of several thousand watts of power, which temporarily blinds people with its brilliance. She can create a cascade of sparkling lights and colors that severely upsets other people's equilibrium, or a pulsating strobe-light effect. She can also radiate light in gentle, soothing patterns to calm a person's mood. Dazzler can generate a coherent beam of light, approximating a laser beam, or generate a shield from laser energy that can deflect projectiles or energy beams. Dazzler has polarizing eyes and cannot be blinded or dazzled by light.

With effort, she can create holograms of human beings and other three-dimensional beings and objects. With similar effort she can also turn herself temporarily invisible and inaudible. She can also use light energy to generate some form of propulsion for flight or at least rapid ascent.

She generally directs lasers from a single finger when she requires precision. She most often uses her hands for directing her light effects, but she could also use other parts of her body. Since studying with the X-Men, she has become adept at directing her blinding strobe light blast from her eyes. The most powerful manifestation of her laser abilities is a concentrated stream of solid photons she usually fires from her index finger but can emit from her entire body. The beam is extremely powerful and as a consequence uses a great deal of her energy reserves. She has also demonstrated the ability to stretch the electromagnetic spectrum to produce devastating microwave energy. She has since learned how to produce these blasts without draining herself, while still providing them with considerable power.

Since the events of Dazzler: The Movie, Alison's body can store sound energy for future discharge as light. Thanks to Professor X, Dazzler's costume contains devices that enable her to store sonic energy more efficiently and to gauge and focus the light she generates with greater skill. She has also demonstrated on at least one occasion the ability to expel the stored sound into a devastating wave of sonic energy, that once destroyed her foe Silence. Dazzler is immune to the injurious effects of her light transducing abilities. Her ability to transduce sound also protects her from being deafened by loud sounds; In Dazzler vol. 2 #1, it was indicated that her ears are highly developed allowing her to detect sounds on frequencies that others cannot register. In X-Treme X-Men vol. 2 #4, she demonstrates the ability to use sound waves for echolocation before absorbing them for energy. Dazzler has also been shown to be immune to the powers of her half-sister Mortis, which ordinarily kills living subjects instantly. With considerable strain, Dazzler is capable of generating ultraviolet light in omnidirectional waves of such intensity that it will melt large metal structures.

Dazzler is a skilled athlete and hand-to-hand combatant thanks to her training with the X-Men and Gladiators, and is able to defeat over a dozen human combatants at once while purposely avoiding use of her mutant abilities. In addition, she is a good singer, actress, and dancer. Dazzler is also an accomplished roller skater and can move at high speed; she is skilled enough to use her roller skates as weapons to strike an opponent's solar plexus in a flying kick. Dazzler occasionally wears a pair of roller skates which magnetically adhere to her boots.

Characters in the Marvel Universe who are counted among her fans are Juggernaut, teammate Colossus, Hulk, Northstar, Rhino, Molly Hayes, Kitty Pryde, Moon Knight, Captain Marvel, and Pixie.

== Cultural impact and legacy ==
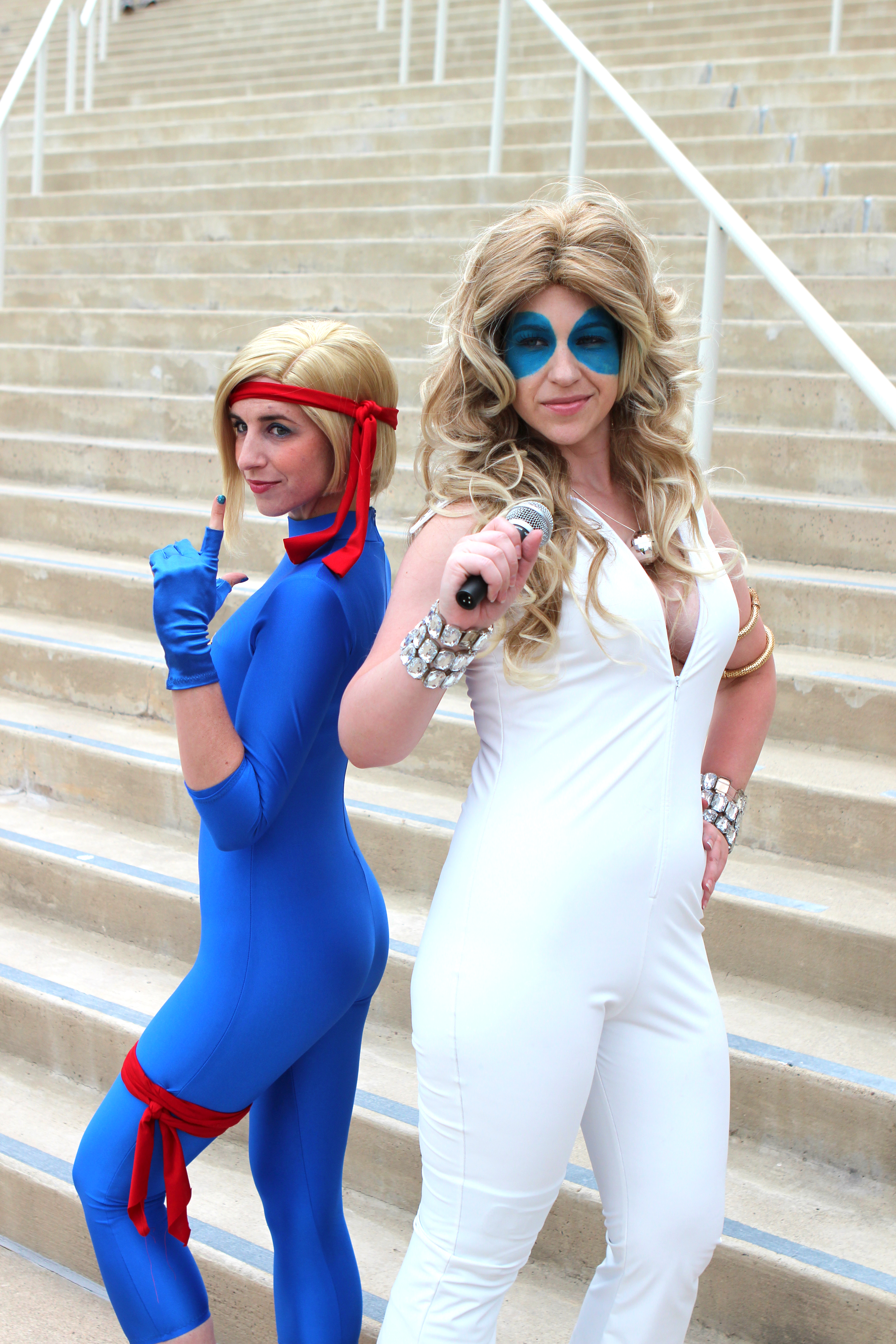
Fans cosplaying as Dazzler.

=== Critical reception ===
Jerry Stanford of CBR.com referred to Dazzler as a "compelling hero," writing, "Dazzler has a fan following strong enough to keep a strong demand for her in the X-Men family of titles. Although her creation is mired in a failed cross-media event with a record company, her legacy in comics is achieving greatness despite her crass origins. Although much of her early adventures are trite, she went on to fame as one of the X-Men." Mike Avila of Syfy described Dazzler as "one of Marvel's most unique and even notorious characters," writing, "After Dazzler headlined her own comic book series, Claremont further developed her as a member of the X-Men. She's no longer quite as prevalent as she used to be, but Dazzler still has a devoted fan following 40 years after her debut." Chris Condry of Looper found Dazzler to be "worthy of more film time and fandom," asserting, "If Alison Blaire, aka Dazzler, were a real person, we daresay that she would be the most iconic woman on Earth. Blaire's day job, or more accurately night job, is as a world-famous pop star... Essentially, Dazzler is what would happen if Lady Gaga spent her free time as John Wick." Bradley Prom of Screen Rant called Dazzler one of the characters who would be perfect for their own animated series.

Alex Welch of Inverse wrote, "She's basically what it would look like if a pop star was an actual superhero." George Marston of Newsarama stated, "The fact is, Dazzler kicks ass. Her ability to turn sound into light has been expanded in creative and crafty ways time and time again, and her look has evolved from disco queen to aerobic video model, to an angst-inspired, darker look, and finally to her current style that combines elements of her previous looks with a modern twist." Marc Buxton| of Den of Geek asserted, "Alison Blaire may have started out as somewhat of a joke, a way for Marvel to take advantage of the disco craze of the 70s, but she hasn't remained that way. Instead, Dazzler has become one of the most beloved X-Men characters ever." In November 2005, during an interview with Newsarama, writer Brian K. Vaughan asserted, "Ultimate Dazzler, on the other hand, may very well be Bendis' single greatest contribution to the free world, so I use her way too much."

=== Accolades ===
Dazzler has been referenced in various internet Listicles.

- In 2011, Comics Buyer's Guide ranked Dazzler 83rd in their "100 Sexiest Women in Comics" list.
- In 2012, ComicsAlliance ranked Dazzler 38th in their "50 Comics and Characters That Resonate with LGBT Readers" list.
- In 2015, Entertainment Weekly ranked Dazzler 52nd in their "Let's rank every X-Man ever" list.
- In 2015, BuzzFeed ranked Dazzler 22nd in their "95 X-Men Members Ranked From Worst To Best" list.
- In 2016, GameSpot included Dazzler in their "25 Most Criminally Underrated X-Men" list.
- In 2017, Screen Rant ranked Dazzler 14th in their "Marvel: 17 Most Powerful Agents Of SHIELD" list.
- In 2018, Comic Book Resources (CBR) ranked Dazzler 4th in their "20 Mutants That Look More Powerful Than They Really Are" list, 14th in their "Marvel's 15 Fiercest Female Mutants" list, and 15th in their "20 Most Powerful Mutants From The '80s" list.
- In 2019, CBR ranked Dazzler 8th in "10 Most Powerful Members Of Excalibur" list and 8th in their "10 Superheroes Who Became Celebrities On Their World" list.
- In 2021, Screen Rant included Dazzler in their "10 Most Powerful Members Of Marvel's A-Force" list.
- In 2022, CBR ranked Dazzler 1st in their "10 Best Comic Book Musicians" list and 11th in their "X-Men: 15 Alpha-Level Mutants Who Are Deceptively Powerful" list.

=== Impact ===
Ira Madison III of MTV described Dazzler as a "gay icon in the annals of Marvel legends," asserting, "Dazzler remains a hugely popular character, particularly among queer Marvel fans. [...] Even though her stories were never tied to the disco scene at large, her journey of struggling for acceptance from a dismissive father and longing for the love of her missing mother was something that queer readers, who only years earlier could have been arrested for showing signs of affection toward a member of the same sex in public, connected with." Jerry Stanford of CBR.com asserted, "Almost since the beginning, the story of mutants in the Marvel Universe has been an allegory for the civil rights of marginalized groups... Dazzler strives for unity and her words mirror things said in the LGBTQ community. Different groups sometimes seek to alienate others as not worthy of inclusion, and the fight here makes a stand for a big tent movement." Andrew Wheeler of ComicsAlliance stated, "Ideas of self-ownership occur again and again in Claremont's stories and characters... Dazzler is mutantdom's first drag performer, using stage theatrics to present her true self to the world. On the stage she could embrace her mutant identity in a way that wouldn't feel safe on the street."

Brian Andersen of The Advocate said, "Dazzler isn't queer. But being the premier superhero pop singer in the Marvel Universe means a strong argument can be made that she's a gay icon." Hayden Manders of Nylon wrote, "All socio-political commentary aside, superhero narratives are filled with strong female characters, which we know makes up a huge percentage of queer icons. Characters like Wonder Woman, Storm, Dazzler, Captain Marvel, and Buffy the Vampire Slayer are fierce and independent, capable of kicking just as much (if not more!) ass as their male counterparts. [...] That sort of representation is vital to the queer experience; it helps normalize what the world often sees as abnormal. Their superpowers only add another element of fearlessness to the community, because to be queer is to have superpowers."

== Other versions ==
=== Age of Apocalypse ===
In the Age of Apocalypse reality, Dazzler appears as a member of the X-Men. She is a chain smoker, having no use for a singing voice in this timeline. She is also more skilled with her powers, being able to create hard-light constructs, as well as manipulate both light and sound. With her powers, Dazzler serves as a one-woman training facility, as well as a messenger via holographic transmissions. She was romantically involved with Exodus.

=== Battle of the Atom ===
In X-Men: Battle of the Atom, Dazzler becomes the first mutant President of the United States in the future. However, during her Inauguration speech, she is assassinated in an attack by demons.

=== Earth X ===
In the Earth X timeline, Dazzler had her heart torn out by Mephisto. Due to the "death" of Death, she remains alive in constant agony.

=== Earth-721 ===
A woman from Earth-721 was given the powers and appearance of Dazzler by Interlocking Technologies. She came to Earth-616 and impersonated the original Alison. She toured the Western States of the US in Dazzler's original costume. However, she was ultimately discovered, stripped of her powers and returned to Earth-721.

=== House of M ===
In the House of M reality, Dazzler is one of the most famous mutants on Earth. After having a successful singing career as a teenager, Dazzler continued her career as the world's primary media personality via her syndicated talk show.

=== Marvel Zombies ===
In the Marvel Zombies universe, Dazzler appears as one of the few uninfected heroes in the limited series Marvel Zombies vs. The Army of Darkness. There, she is almost eaten by an infected Winter Soldier until he is killed by Ash Williams. Ash is attracted to Dazzler, but she does not reciprocate his feelings. As a thanks for saving her, Dazzler agrees to help Ash find the Necronomicon book that might put an end to the zombies. The duo pair up with the Scarlet Witch to discover that the Necronomicon is being kept at Doctor Doom's fortress in Latveria. An infected Enchantress bites off Dazzler's finger, infecting her, but Doom appears and vaporizes them both before Dazzler is turned.

=== Secret Wars ===
A version of Dazzler appeared during the 2015 "Secret Wars" storyline as part of the Thor Corps, a paramilitary organization charged with policing Battleworld and enforcing the will of God Emperor Doom. Dazzler later appears in the mainstream Earth-616 universe, after coming through a multi-dimensional portal and joins A-Force in their fight against the Countess, a dragon who came through the same portal. After Countess is defeated, Dazzler Thor is afflicted with Terrigen Mist and vanishes.

=== Ultimate Marvel ===
The Ultimate Marvel incarnation of Dazzler is introduced as a punk rock singer in Ultimate X-Men #42. She briefly joins Emma Frost's Academy of Tomorrow when promised a record deal, but joins the X-Men after they rescue her from a Sentinel attack. There she is called "Dazzler" after the name of her band. She often shows a lack of enthusiasm for the X-Men and their endeavors, but after learning of a proposed public execution of a mutant, she convinces a group of teammates to go on a rescue mission. When the mission goes astray and Angel is captured, Dazzler takes initiative and leads the team in a recovery operation. Dazzler later joins the X-Men. When Magneto's worldwide devastation hits the X-Men, Dazzler is revealed by Jean Grey to have been killed in the tidal wave along with teammates Beast and Nightcrawler.

The Ultimate iteration of Dazzler is able to detonate small particles at will, allowing her to create blasts of light. Under the influence of the drug Banshee, Dazzler's powers are vastly increased, and she is able to create solid light constructs.

=== X-Babies ===
A member of the X-Babies is based on Dazzler.

=== X-Men: The End ===
In X-Men: The End, a series about the X-Men's hypothetical future, Dazzler continued her career as a singer. An occasional "reserve" team member, she joined Storm and X-Men members Iceman, Bishop, Psylocke, and Sage for Xavier's "Plan B" team. Co-piloting a ship to the Shi'ar homeworld, Dazzler uses her powers to create a light show, calming the battling X-Men and the Imperial Guard. Cassandra Nova then manifests, killing the Imperial Guard and leaving the remaining X-Men as her sole adversaries. Dazzler attempts to subdue Nova along with Storm and Iceman, but is killed.

=== What If ===
Dazzler was featured in two issues of What If:

- In What If #33 (June 1982), Dazzler decides to stay Galactus' herald after she defeats Terrax. After many years of servitude during which she guides Galactus to feed on uninhabited worlds to spare the lives of beings on other planets, she is free to return to Earth. When she arrives, Dazzler discovers the Earth had become a barren wasteland. With nowhere else to go, she returns to Galactus who welcomes her return.
- In a two-part What If? story (What if Cable had destroyed the X-Men? and What if Magneto took over the U.S.?) based on Uncanny X-Men #269, Dazzler is an agent of Magneto. She is ultimately killed by a Sentinel warhead.

== In other media ==
=== Television ===
- Dazzler appears in X-Men: Pryde of the X-Men, voiced by Alexandra Stoddart. This version is a member of the X-Men.
- Dazzler appears in X-Men: The Animated Series, voiced by Catherine Disher.
- Dazzler makes minor non-speaking appearances in Wolverine and the X-Men as an inhabitant of Genosha.
- Hulu intended to air a Tigra & Dazzler animated series, written and executive produced by Erica Rivinoja and Chelsea Handler. Following their series, the pair would have teamed up with MODOK, Hit-Monkey and Howard the Duck in the animated special The Offenders. In December 2019, Rivinoja and the entire writing staff was fired due to creative differences. Handler was still attached to the project. In January 2020, it was announced that Tigra & Dazzler, along with the Howard the Duck series were canceled, making The Offenders unlikely.
- Dazzler appears in the X-Men '97 episode "Remember It".
- Dazzler appears in Lego Marvel Avengers: Mission Demolition, voiced by Julie Nathanson.

=== Film ===
- In the early 1980s, screenwriter Gary Goddard was commissioned to write a script for a film based on Dazzler, starring Bo Derek.
- Alison Blaire / Dazzler makes a cameo appearance in Dark Phoenix, portrayed by Halston Sage. This version is a student of Xavier's School for Gifted Youngsters in the 1990s.

=== Video games ===
- Dazzler appears as a playable character in X-Men.
- Dazzler appears as a playable character in X-Men: Madness in Murderworld.
- Dazzler appears as a playable character in X-Men II: The Fall of the Mutants.
- Dazzler appears as a NPC in the PC version of X-Men Legends II: Rise of Apocalypse.
- Dazzler makes a cameo appearance in Felicia's ending in Marvel vs. Capcom 3: Fate of Two Worlds.
- Dazzler appears in Stern Pinball: Deadpool, voiced by Jennifer Lafleur.
- Dazzler appears as a playable character in Marvel Puzzle Quest.
- Dazzler appears as a playable character in Marvel Future Fight.
- Dazzler appears as a playable character in Marvel Strike Force.
- Dazzler appears in Marvel Snap.

=== Merchandise ===
- Heroclix has released multiple Dazzler figures.
- Dazzler has received multiple Marvel Legends figures. Her classic costume in 2017, Outback costume in 2019, and as part of a Mojoworld pack in 2022.
- Youtooz released a classic Dazzler figure in 2024.
- Sideshow Collectibles released a figure of Dazzler in 2024.
- Dazzler received a Funko Pop figure for the 2025 San Diego Comic-Con.

=== Other ===
- Aconyte Books published a 2022 Dazzler novel titled Sound of Light, by author Amanda Bridgeman.
- Dazzler appeared in two fan-made music videos, portrayed by Gentry Ross.

== Collected editions ==
Title	Material collected	Published date	ISBN
Dazzler: The Movie	Marvel Graphic Novel #12	January 1990	978-0871350008
Essential Dazzler Vol. 1	Dazzler #1-21, X-Men (vol. 1) #130-131, Amazing Spider-Man (vol. 1) #203	August 2007	978-0785126959
Essential Dazzler Vol. 2	Dazzler #22-42, Marvel Graphic Novel #12, Beauty and The Beast #1-4, Secret Wars II #4	April 2009	978-0785137306
Marvel Masterworks: Dazzler Vol. 1	Dazzler #1-13, X-Men (vol. 1) #130-131, Amazing Spider-Man (vol. 1) #203	March 2020	978-1302922122
Marvel Masterworks: Dazzler Vol. 2	Dazzler #14-25, material from What If #33	April 2021	978-1302928674
Marvel Masterworks: Dazzler Vol. 3	Dazzler #26-34, Marvel Graphic Novel #12	May 2022	978-1302933180
X-Women	Dazzler (vol. 2) #1 and X-Women #1, X-23 (vol. 2) #1, Cloak & Dagger (vol. 4) #1	February 2013	978-0785162797
Dazzler Omnibus	Dazzler (vol. 1) #1-42, X-Men (vol. 1) #130-131, Amazing Spider-Man (vol. 1) #203, Marvel Graphic Novel #12, Beauty and The Beast #1-4, Secret Wars II #4, material from What If #33	October 2024	978-1302959609
