= Saga de Xam =

Saga de Xam is a comic written by film director Jean Rollin and illustrated by Nicolas Devil. It was published in 1967 by French company Éric Losfeld in a single one-shot.

The book is the fantastic story of Saga, the girl with the blue skin from planet Xam. Is one of the rarest and most authentic examples of psychedelic graphic novel, which represents numerous cultural issues typical of the second half of the 1960s. The pages of "Saga" were originally drawn on large size sheets, that have been reduced to a “book” size (25 x 32cm, or appx. 10 x 12.5"), resulting in a very small text.
