= Evergreen Review =

American literary magazine founded in 1957

The Evergreen Review

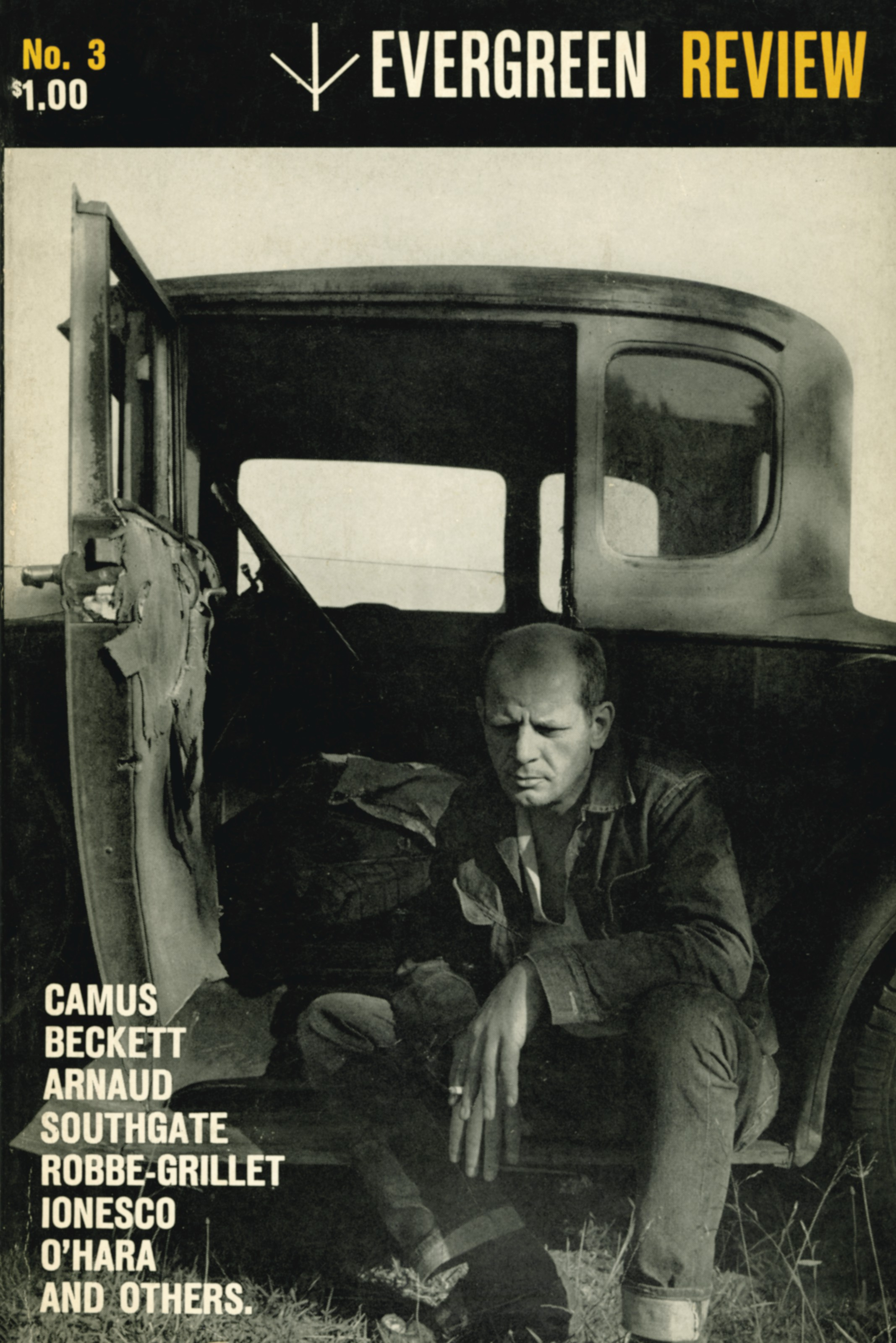
- Issue cover dated Summer 1957, featuring Jackson Pollock
- Editor-in-Chief: Dale Peck
- Publisher: John Oakes
- Founder: Barney Rosset
- Founded: 1957; 69 years ago
- Country: United States
- Based in: New York City
- Language: English
- Website: www.evergreenreview.com
- ISSN: 0014-3758

The Evergreen Review is a U.S.-based literary magazine. Its publisher is John Oakes and its editor-in-chief is Dale Peck. The Evergreen Review was founded by Barney Rosset, publisher of Grove Press. It existed in print from 1957 until 1984, and was re-launched online in 1998, and again in 2017. Its lasting impact can be seen in the March–April 1960 issue, which included work by Albert Camus, Lawrence Ferlinghetti, Bertolt Brecht and Amiri Baraka, as well as Edward Albee's first play, The Zoo Story (1958). The Camus piece was a reprint of "Reflections on the Guillotine", first published in English in the Review in 1957 and reprinted on this occasion as the magazine's "contribution to the worldwide debate on the problem of capital punishment and, more specifically, the case of Caryl Whittier Chessman." The magazine's commitment to the progressive side of the political spectrum has been consistent, with early stance for civil rights and against the Vietnam War. The image of Che Guevara that first appeared on the cover of its February 1968 issue, designed by Paul Davis and based on a photograph by Alberto Korda, became a popular symbol of resistance.

== Writers ==
The Evergreen Review debuted pivotal works by Samuel Beckett, Jorge Luis Borges, Charles Bukowski, William S. Burroughs, Marguerite Duras, Jean Genet, Allen Ginsberg, Günter Grass, Jack Kerouac, Norman Mailer, Henry Miller, Pablo Neruda, Vladimir Nabokov, Frank O’Hara, Kenzaburō Ōe, Octavio Paz, Harold Pinter, Susan Sontag, Tom Stoppard, Michael Ernest Sweet, Derek Walcott and Malcolm X. United States Supreme Court Justice William O. Douglas wrote a controversial piece for the magazine in 1969. Kerouac and Ginsberg regularly had their writing published in the magazine.

== Illustrators ==
Although primarily a literary magazine, Evergreen Review always contained numerous illustrations. In its early years, these included a small number of cartoons. By the mid-1960s, many illustrations and photographs were of an erotic nature, including a serialized graphic novel, The Adventures of Phoebe Zeit-Geist by writer Michael O'Donoghue and artist Frank Springer. It was later published as a Grove Press hardcover in 1968 and trade paperback in 1969.

== Evergreen evolution ==
Ken Jordan, writing in the introduction to the Evergreen Review Reader, 1957–1996, described the counter-cultural contents and the impact of the publication on readers:

The first issue featured an essay by Jean-Paul Sartre and an interview with the great New Orleans jazz drummer Baby Dodds. It also included a story of Samuel Beckett's Dante and the Lobster, the first of his many appearances in the pages of Evergreen, which continued through to the last [print] issue published.

The second issue was a landmark. A banner across the cover declared "San Francisco Scene," and inside held the first collection of work by the new Beat writers - including Lawrence Ferlinghetti, Gary Snyder, Michael McClure, Philip Whalen, Jack Kerouac (before the publication of On the Road) and Allen Ginsberg, whose Howl had already been published as a pamphlet by Ferlinghetti's press, City Lights, and was confiscated by customs officials and faced trial for obscenity in San Francisco. The issue brought the Beats and Evergreen Review to the forefront of the American stage...

Evergreen published writing that was literally counter to the culture, and if it was sexy, so much the better. In the context of the time, sex was politics, and the powers-that-be made the suppression of sexuality a political issue. The court battles that Grove Press fought for the legal publication of Lady Chatterley's Lover, Tropic of Cancer, and Naked Lunch, and for the legal distribution of the film I Am Curious: Yellow, spilled onto the pages of Evergreen Review, and in 1964, an issue of Evergreen itself was confiscated in New York State by the Nassau County District Attorney on obscenity charges...

All of this was done on a shoestring budget by a tiny staff. Barney Rosset started the magazine with editor Don Allen and Fred Jordan, who was nominally the business manager in its early days. Richard Seaver joined the editorial team with the ninth issue, and Don Allen stepped back to become a contributing editor. Publication increased from quarterly to bimonthly to, in the late sixties, monthly, and the format changed from trade paperback to a full-sized, glossy magazine attaining a subscription base of some 40,000 copies and a newsstand circulation of 100,000.

== Online ==
The print edition of Evergreen Review ceased publication in 1984, but the magazine was revived in 1998 in an online edition edited by founder Barney Rosset and his wife Astrid Myers. The online magazine featured American lyric poets such as Dennis Nurkse and postcolonial authors such as Giannina Braschi. The online version ceased publication in 2013 and was revived in March 2017 with OR Books co-publisher John Oakes as publisher and writer and critic Dale Peck as editor-in-chief. The poetry editor is Jee Leong Koh. Contributing editors include Porochista Khakpour and Jeffery Renard Allen.

== Collections ==
- Rosset, Barney, ed. Evergreen Review Reader: A ten-year anthology of America's leading literary magazine (1957–1968). Grove Press, 1968.
- Rosset, Barney, ed. Evergreen Review Reader 1957-1966. Arcade/Blue Moon, 1994.
- Rosset, Barney, ed. Evergreen Review Reader 1967-1973. Four Walls Eight Windows, 1998.
- Halter, Ed, and Barney Rosset, eds. From the Third Eye: The Evergreen Review Film Reader. Seven Stories Press, 2018, ISBN 978-1-60980-615-6

== See also ==
- New World Writing
- Moody Street Irregulars
- Barbarella - translated into English by Richard Seaver and published in Evergreen Review #37–39 (1965–1966)
- Donald D. Lorenzen (1920–80), Los Angeles City Council member, 1969–77, had Evergreen Review removed from library shelves.
