= Barbarella (film) =

1968 film by Roger Vadim

- Theatrical release poster by Robert McGinnis
- Directed by: Roger Vadim
- Screenplay by: Terry Southern; Roger Vadim; Claude Brulé; Vittorio Bonicelli; Clement Biddle Wood; Brian Degas; Tudor Gates; Jean-Claude Forest
- Based on: Barbarella by Jean-Claude Forest
- Produced by: Dino De Laurentiis
- Starring: Jane Fonda; John Phillip Law; Marcel Marceau; David Hemmings; Ugo Tognazzi
- Cinematography: Claude Renoir
- Edited by: Victoria Mercanton
- Music by: Bob Crewe; Charles Fox
- Production companies: Marianne Productions; Dino De Laurentiis Cinematografica
- Distributed by: Paramount Pictures
- Release dates: 11 October 1968 (New York); 18 October 1968 (Italy); 25 October 1968 (France)
- Running time: 98 minutes
- Countries: France; Italy
- Language: English
- Budget: $4–9 million
- Box office: $5.5 million (North American rentals)

Barbarella (later marketed as Barbarella: Queen of the Galaxy) is a 1968 English-language science fiction film directed by Roger Vadim, based on the French comic series by Jean-Claude Forest. The film stars Jane Fonda as the title character, a space traveler and representative of the United Earth government sent to find scientist Dr. Durand Durand, who has created a weapon that could destroy humanity. The supporting cast includes John Phillip Law, Anita Pallenberg, Milo O'Shea, Marcel Marceau, Claude Dauphin, David Hemmings and Ugo Tognazzi.

Having expressed an interest in comics and science fiction, Vadim was hired to direct Barbarella after producer Dino De Laurentiis purchased the film rights to the comic series. Vadim attempted to cast several actresses in the title role before choosing Fonda, his then-wife. A friend of Vadim's, Terry Southern, wrote the initial screenplay, which changed considerably during filming and led to seven other writers being credited in the final release, including Vadim and Forest, the latter of whom also worked on the film's production design. The film began shooting immediately following the completion of another De Laurentiis comic adaptation, Danger: Diabolik, with both films sharing several cast and crew members.

The film was particularly popular in the United Kingdom, where it was the year's second-highest-grossing film. Contemporary film critics praised Barbarella's visuals and cinematography but found its storyline weak after the first few scenes. Although several attempts at sequels, remakes, and other adaptations have been planned, none of these have entered production.

== Plot ==
In an unspecified future, (Note: Although not identified in the film itself, reviews and press materials have variously stated that the film takes place in either the 41st century or the year 40,000 AD.) space adventurer Barbarella is sent by the Earth's president to retrieve Durand Durand from the Tau Ceti planetary system. Durand is the inventor of a laser-powered weapon, the positronic ray, which Earth's leaders fear will cause mass destruction. Barbarella crash-lands on Tau Ceti's 16th planet (Note: In some promotional materials, the planet is named Lythion.) and is knocked unconscious by two children. They bring her to the wreckage of a spaceship, where they bind and attack her using mechanical dolls with razor-sharp teeth. Barbarella is rescued by Mark Hand, the Catchman who patrols the ice looking for errant children. Hand tells her that Durand is in the city of Sogo and offers her a ride to her ship in his ice boat. When Barbarella offers to repay him, Hand asks her to have sex with him. Barbarella is confused since Earthlings no longer have intimate physical contact; instead, they take pills "until full rapport is achieved." Hand suggests having sex in his bed instead. Barbarella relents and enjoys it but admits that she understands why sex is considered primitive and distracting on Earth.

Barbarella leaves the planet and crashes into a labyrinth inhabited by outcasts exiled from Sogo. She is found by Pygar, a blind angel who has lost the will to fly. Pygar introduces her to Professor Ping, who offers to repair her ship. Pygar flies Barbarella to Sogo, a den of violence and debauchery, after she restores his will to fly by having sex with him. Pygar and Barbarella are captured by Sogo's Black Queen and her concierge. The concierge describes the Mathmos: living energy in liquid form, powered by evil thoughts and used as an energy source in Sogo, which sits atop it. Pygar endures a mock crucifixion and Barbarella is placed in a cage, where hundreds of birds prepare to attack her. She is rescued by Dildano, leader of the local underground, who joins in her pursuit of Durand. Dildano gives her an invisible key to the Black Queen's chamber of dreams, where she sleeps.

After returning to Sogo, Barbarella is promptly recaptured by the concierge. He places her in the "Excessive Machine" which induces fatal sexual pleasure. She outlasts the machine and makes it go haywire. The concierge, shocked at its destruction, reveals himself as Durand Durand. Barbarella is surprised since he is only 25 years old but has aged tremendously—a side effect of the Mathmos. Durand wants to overthrow the Black Queen and become Sogo's new leader, which requires using his positronic ray and gaining access to the Queen's chamber of dreams. Durand takes Barbarella to the chamber and locks her inside with the invisible key. She awakens the Queen, who warns that if two people are in the chamber, the Mathmos will devour them. Durand seizes control of Sogo as Dildano and his rebels begin their attack on the city. Durand uses the positronic ray to irretrievably send Professor Ping and Dildano to another dimension. The Black Queen retaliates by releasing the Mathmos to destroy Sogo. Because of Barbarella's innocence, the Mathmos forms a protective bubble around her and the Black Queen and safely expels them. They find Pygar, who clutches them in his arms and flies off. When Barbarella asks Pygar why he saved a tyrant, he tells her that an angel has no memory of the past.

== Cast ==
- Jane Fonda as Barbarella
- John Phillip Law as Pygar
- Anita Pallenberg as the Black Queen, Great Tyrant of Sogo
  - Joan Greenwood as the voice of the Black Queen
- Milo O'Shea as Durand Durand
- Marcel Marceau as Professor Ping
- Claude Dauphin as the President of Earth
- Véronique Vendell as Captain Moon
- Serge Marquand as Captain Sun
- Giancarlo Cobelli as the Revolutionary
- David Hemmings as Dildano
- Ugo Tognazzi as Mark Hand

== Production ==
=== Development and writing ===
Having bought the film rights to Jean-Claude Forest's Barbarella comics, producer Dino De Laurentiis secured a distribution deal in the United States between France's Marianne Productions and Paramount Pictures. He planned to film Danger: Diabolik, a less-expensive feature, to help cover production costs. In 1966 Roger Vadim expressed admiration for comics (particularly Charles Schulz's Peanuts), saying that he liked "the wild humor and impossible exaggeration of comic strips" and wanted to "do something in that style myself in my next film, Barbarella." Vadim saw the film as a chance to "depict a new futuristic morality ... Barbarella has [no] guilt about her body. I want to make something beautiful out of eroticism." His wife, actress Jane Fonda, noted that Vadim was a fan of science fiction; according to the director, "In science fiction, technology is everything ... The characters are so boring—they have no psychology. I want to do this film as though I had arrived on a strange planet with my camera directly on my shoulder—as though I was a reporter doing a newsreel."

After Terry Southern finished writing Peter Sellers' dialogue for Casino Royale, he flew to Paris to meet Vadim and Fonda. Southern, who had known Vadim in Paris during the early 1950s, saw writing a science-fiction comedy based on a comic book as a new challenge. He enjoyed writing the script, particularly the opening striptease and the scenes with tiny robotic toys pursuing Barbarella to bite her. Southern enjoyed working with Vadim and Fonda, but he felt that De Laurentiis was intent only on making a cheap film that was not necessarily good. Southern said later, "Vadim wasn't particularly interested in the script, but he was a lot of fun, with a discerning eye for the erotic, grotesque, and the absurd. And Jane Fonda was super in all regards." Southern was surprised to see his screenplay credited to Vadim and several Italian screenwriters in addition to himself. Credited screenwriters included Claude Brulé, Vittorio Bonicelli, Clement Biddle Wood, Brian Degas, Tudor Gates, and Forest; Degas and Gates were hired by De Laurentiis after he was impressed with their work on Danger: Diabolik. Charles B. Griffith later said that he had done uncredited work on the script; the production team "hired fourteen other writers" after Southern "before they got to me. I didn't get credit because I was the last one." According to Griffith, he "rewrote about a quarter of the film that was shot, then re-shot, and I added the concept that there had been thousands of years since violence existed so that Barbarella was very clumsy all through the picture. She shoots herself in the foot and everything. It was pretty ludicrous. The stuff with Claude Dauphin and the suicide room was also part of my contribution to the film."

=== Pre-production and casting ===
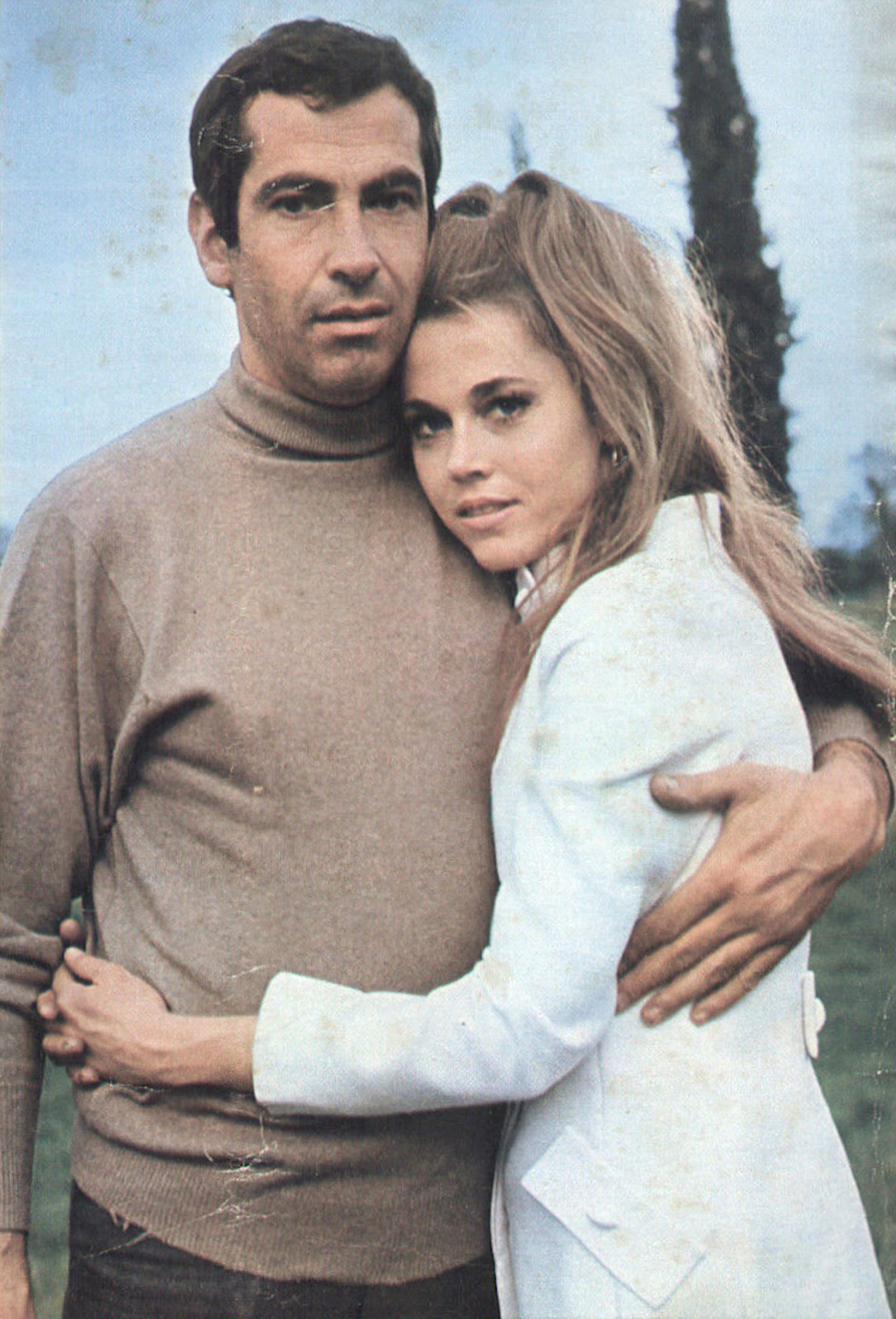
Roger Vadim and Jane Fonda in Rome during the filming, May 1967

Several actresses were approached before Jane Fonda was cast as Barbarella: Brigitte Bardot, who was not interested in a sexualized role, Virna Lisi, who turned down the role for the same reasons and Sophia Loren, who was pregnant and felt that she would not fit the role. Fonda was uncertain about the film, but Vadim convinced her by saying that science fiction was a rapidly evolving genre. Before filming Barbarella, she was the subject of two sex scandals: the first when her nude body was displayed across an eight-storey billboard promoting the premiere of Circle of Love in 1965, and the second when several candid nude photos from Vadim's closed set for The Game Is Over were sold to Playboy the following year. According to biographer Thomas Kiernan, the billboard incident made her a sex symbol in the United States. Vadim said he did not want the actress to play Barbarella "tongue in cheek", and he saw the character as "just a lovely, average girl with a terrific space record and a lovely body. I am not going to intellectualise her. Although there is going to be a bit of satire about our morals and our ethics, the picture is going to be more of a spectacle than a cerebral exercise for a few way-out intellectuals." Fonda felt her priority for Barbarella was to "keep her innocent"; the character "is not a vamp and her sexuality is not measured by the rules of our society. She is not being promiscuous but she follows the natural reaction of another type of upbringing. She is not a so-called 'sexually liberated woman' either. That would mean rebellion against something. She is different. She was born free".

Fonda personally recommended John Phillip Law as Pygar to Vadim following their work on Hurry Sundown; for the duration of his stay in Rome, the actor lived with Fonda, Vadim and Forest in their rented villa on Appian Way. Law, an avid comic book reader since childhood, read the Forest comics and studied the DC Comics character Hawkman for inspiration. The delayed pre-production of Barbarella allowed Law to film two roles before committing to the film: as Bill Meceita in the Spaghetti Western Death Rides a Horse, and as the title character in Danger: Diabolik. For the role of the Black Queen, Southern recommended model Anita Pallenberg, the then-girlfriend of the Rolling Stones member Brian Jones; Southern had befriended her while working with the band on an unmade adaptation of the Anthony Burgess novel A Clockwork Orange. On the English-language prints of the film, Pallenberg's voice was dubbed by English actress Joan Greenwood.

French mime Marcel Marceau had his first speaking role in the film as Professor Ping. Comparing Ping to his stage persona Bip the Clown and Harpo Marx, he said that he did not "forget the lines, but I have trouble organising them. It's a different way of making what's inside come out. It goes from the brain to the vocal chords, and not directly to the body."

All costumes in the film, including Fonda's, were designed by French costume designer Jacques Fonteray and manufactured by Sartoria Farani, with Barbarella's costume in the final scenes being, as the credits put it, "inspired by ideas of" fashion designer Paco Rabanne. Barbarella's outfits were Fonteray's interpretation of Forest's vision, combining Orientalist and medieval aesthetics with samurai armors. Forest also worked on the film's production design, and was credited in the film as its "artistic consultant". In a 1985 interview, he said that during production, he did not care about his original comic strip and was more interested in the film industry: "The Italian artists were incredible; they could build anything in an extremely short time. I saw all the daily rushes, an incredible amount of film. The choices that were made for the final cut from those images were not the ones I would have liked, but I was not the director. It wasn't my business."

=== Filming ===
According to Law, Barbarella began shooting after production on Danger: Diabolik ended on 18 June 1967; sets such as Valmont's night club in Danger: Diabolik were used in both films. Barbarella was shot at Cinecittà in Rome. To film the striptease titles sequence, Fonda said that the set was turned upward to face the ceiling of the soundstage. A pane of thick glass was laid across the opening of the set, with the camera hung from the rafters above it. Fonda then climbed onto the glass to perform the scene. Other scenes involved hanging Fonda upside down in an enormous vat of oil and dry ice, and her stomach being skinned when being shot through a plastic tube. For the scenes involving the Excessive Pleasure Machine, Fonda and Milo O'Shea were not told of explosions that would happen on set since the prop was rigged with flares and smoke bombs. Fonda explained that "Vadim wanted us to look natural, so he didn't tell us what a big explosion there would be. When the machine blew up, flames and smoke were everywhere, and sparks were running up and down the wires. I was frightened to death, and poor Milo was convinced something had really gone wrong and I was being electrocuted."

For the scene involving Barbarella being attacked by hummingbirds, budgerigars were used as it was illegal to ship hummingbirds overseas. The birds were not behaving as Vadim had expected, which led to him employing a large fan to blow them at Fonda, who had birdseed in her costume. Film critic Roger Ebert, after visiting the set, wrote that the fan led to birds "losing control over natural body functions, so it was all a little messy". Ebert concluded that "After two weeks of this, [Fonda] got a fever and was hospitalized. I can't reveal here how they finally did the scene".

The actress later described her discomfort on the film's set. In her autobiography, Fonda said that Vadim began drinking during lunch; his words slurred, and "his decisions about how to shoot scenes often seemed ill-considered". Fonda was bulimic and, at the time, was "a young woman who hated her body...playing a scantily clad, sometimes-naked sexual heroine". Photographer David Hurn echoed Fonda, noting that she was insecure about her appearance during the production's photo shoots. The actress took sick days so the film's insurance policy would cover the cost of a shutdown while the script was edited. Vadim later stated in his memoir that Fonda "didn't enjoy shooting Barbarella", specifically that she "disliked the central character for her lack of principle, her shameless exploitation of her sexuality and her irrelevance to contemporary social and political realities."

== Soundtrack ==
Michel Magne was commissioned to score Barbarella, but his effort was discarded. The film's soundtrack, completed by composer-producers Bob Crewe and Charles Fox, has been described as lounge or exotica. Crewe was known for composing 1960s songs such as the Four Seasons' "Big Girls Don't Cry". Some of the music is credited to the Bob Crewe Generation, a group of session musicians who contributed to the soundtrack. Crewe invited the New York-based group The Glitterhouse, whom he knew through his production work, to provide vocals for the songs. He reflected on the soundtrack in his autobiography, saying that it "clearly needed to have a fun and futuristic approach to it, with sixties-music sensibility".

== Release ==
Barbarella opened in New York City on 11 October 1968 and earned $2.5 million in North American theaters that year. It was the second-most-popular film in general release in the United Kingdom in 1968, after The Jungle Book. The film was shown in Paris that month, and was released in Italy on 18 October. It was released on 25 October in France by Paramount. Barbarella received a "condemned" rating from the National Catholic Office for Motion Pictures, which called the film a "sick, heavy-handed fantasy with nudity and graphic representations of sadism" and criticized the Production Code Administration for approving it. Following the success of Star Wars, Paramount theatrically re-released the film in 1977; for this release, which was referred to in promotional materials as Barbarella: Queen of the Galaxy, the scenes of nudity were removed.

== Home media ==
Despite frequently using the Barbarella: Queen of the Galaxy title and promotional art, home media releases of the film have been of the uncut 1968 version rather than the edited 1977 version. In 1994, the film's LaserDisc presented it in widescreen for the first time on home video. Reviewing this release for Video Watchdog, Tim Lucas noted that the film was presented with an incorrect aspect ratio of 2.47:1, resulting in the cropping of visual information that was present in the earlier pan and scan VHS releases, but noted that "many of Claude Renoir's 'psychedelia' images work on video only in this widescreen setting".

Barbarella was released on DVD on 22 June 1999, and on Blu-ray in July 2012, with the 1968 theatrical trailer the disc's only bonus feature. According to Charles Taylor of The New York Times, home media releases of the film before the Blu-ray version were "murky". Chris Nashawaty of Entertainment Weekly, Sean Axmaker of Video Librarian and Glenn Erickson of DVD Talk called Barbarella's Blu-ray transfer "breathtaking", "superb-looking" and "really good", respectively. The film was released on 4K Ultra HD and Blu-ray on 28 November 2023 by Arrow Video.

== Reception ==
On the review aggregator website Rotten Tomatoes, the film holds an approval rating of 64% based on 76 reviews, with an average score of 6.2/10. The website's critics consensus reads, "Unevenly paced and thoroughly cheesy, Barbarella is nonetheless full of humor, entertaining visuals, and Jane Fonda's sex appeal." Metacritic, which uses a weighted average, assigned the film a score of 51 out of 100, based on 13 critics, indicating "mixed or average" reviews.

=== Contemporary ===
Some contemporary publications reported that the film's first scenes were enjoyable, but its quality declined thereafter. According to Wendy Michener's review in The Globe and Mail, after the striptease scene "we are plunged back into the mundane, not to say inane world, of the spy thriller with a dreary overlay of futuristic science-fiction" and it "just lies there, with all its psychedelic plastic settings". Barbarella's script and humor were criticized; a reviewer in Variety described the writing as "flat" with only "a few silly-funny lines of dialog" for a "cast that is not particularly adept at comedy". Dan Bates wrote in Film Quarterly that "sharp satiric moments ... are welcome and refreshing but are rather infrequent", and Renata Adler of The New York Times noted that "there is the assumption that just mentioning a thing (sex, politics, religion) makes it funny".

Several critics praised the film's design and cinematography. Variety's mainly negative review noted "a certain amount of production dash and polish" and, according to Derek Malcolm of The Guardian, "Claude Renoir's limpid colour photography and August Lohman's eye-catching special effects are what save the movie time and again". A Monthly Film Bulletin reviewer wrote that Barbarella's decor is "remarkably faithful to Jean-Claude Forest's originals", noting a "major contribution of Claude Renoir as director of photography" and "Jacques Fonterary's and Paco Rabanne's fantastic costumes". James Price of Sight and Sound agreed, citing "the inventiveness of the decors and the richness of Claude Renoir's photography".

Malcolm and Adler criticized the film's nature, themes and tone, with Malcolm calling it a "nasty kind of film", "modish to the core" and "essentially just a shrewd piece of exploitation". Adler suggested the film's humor was "not jokes, but hard-breathing, sadistic thrashings." Bates called it "pure sub-adolescent junk" and "bereft of redeeming social or artistic importance".

Michener praised Barbarella as part of "the first female sci-fi". Its shaggy gold rugs, impressionist paintings and spaceship were "unquestionably female in design compared with any of today's projectiles"; Barbarella is "no man-challenging superwoman, but a sweet soft creature who's always willing to please a man who's king to her". According to Price, "There is a real fascination in its basic idea, which is a happy belief in the survival of sexuality... The idea fascinates, but the execution somehow disappoints (how often one has to say that about Vadim)." Bates' review concluded, "In the year that Stanley Kubrick and Franklin Schaffner finally elevated the science-fiction movie beyond the abyss of the kiddie show, Roger Vadim has knocked it right back down."

Writing in The New Yorker, Pauline Kael was disappointed by the film overall, but praised its star: "Jane Fonda is accomplished at a distinctive kind of double take: she registers comic disbelief that such naughty things can be happening to her, and then her disbelief changes into an even more comic delight. Her American-good-girl innocence makes her a marvellously apt heroine for pornographic comedy. She has the skittish innocence of a teen-age voluptuary; when she takes off her clothes, she is playfully and deliciously aware of the naughtiness of what she's doing, and that innocent's sense of naughtiness, of being a tarnished lady, keeps her from being just another naked actress."

Roger Ebert of The Chicago Sun-Times did not publish a standalone review of Barbarella, but did reference it in his review for the parallel production Danger: Diabolik which featured many of the same actors and crew. Ebert felt the latter film was superior, notably with a better visual look and stronger performance from John Phillip Law: "'Barbarella' was a flop for several reasons: The production values and script were shoddy, and director Roger Vadim had trouble getting passable special effects."

=== Retrospective ===
Numerous retrospective reviews have discussed Barbarella's plot and design. While stating that Barbarella "hardly ranks with Blood and Roses or Charlotte as one of Vadim's best", Lucas says that "Whatever charm the film still holds is entirely due to its visual imagination and highly over-done, Felliniesque artifice". According to The A.V. Club's Keith Phipps, "Mario Garbuglia keeps throwing inventive visuals and remarkable sets at the heroine" but "the journey itself is an unrelenting trudge". Sean Axmaker of Video Librarian called the film's "set design and wild color triumphing over story and character". Taylor perceived a lack of "plot impetus", suggesting that Vadim may have been "preoccupied with the special effects, though they are [and were] rather cheesy". Kim Newman of Empire gave Barbarella three stars out of five, calling the film "literally episodic" and writing that the episodes spend "more time on the art direction, the costuming and the psychedelic music track than the plot".

About its sexual elements, Brian J. Dillard wrote that the film's gender roles were not "particularly progressive, especially given the running gag about Barbarella getting her first few tastes of physical copulation after a lifetime of 'advanced' virtual sex" in his review on AllMovie. Phipps found the film "a missed opportunity", saying that the source material was part of "an emerging wave of European comics for adults" which "Vadim film[ed] indifferently." David Kehr of the Chicago Reader found the film "ugly" on several levels, particularly its "human values". Newman summarized the film as "cheerful, kitsch and camp", with "a succession of truly amazing fashion creations with all the confidence of a generation that thought sex was, above all, fun". Newman compared the film to 2001: A Space Odyssey and Star Wars, writing that Barbarella makes them seem "stuffy" by comparison. Charles Webb's review for MTV said that Barbarella suffers when described as a "camp classic", since there was "so much to like about Fonda's work here and the movie as a whole"; "Fonda brings naivete and sweetness to a part that requires a certain level of comfort going bare onscreen, while the hostile planet Lythion is a parade of inventive and odd ways to imperil our heroine." Similarly, Lucas declared that "Fonda's performance, which the silly persist in finding controversial or compromising, has dated better than 90% of her 'serious' work; without her centrifugal, wide-eyed presence and suspenseful costume changes, one gets the impression that the whole production might spin madly out of control and off the screen".

== Legacy and influence ==
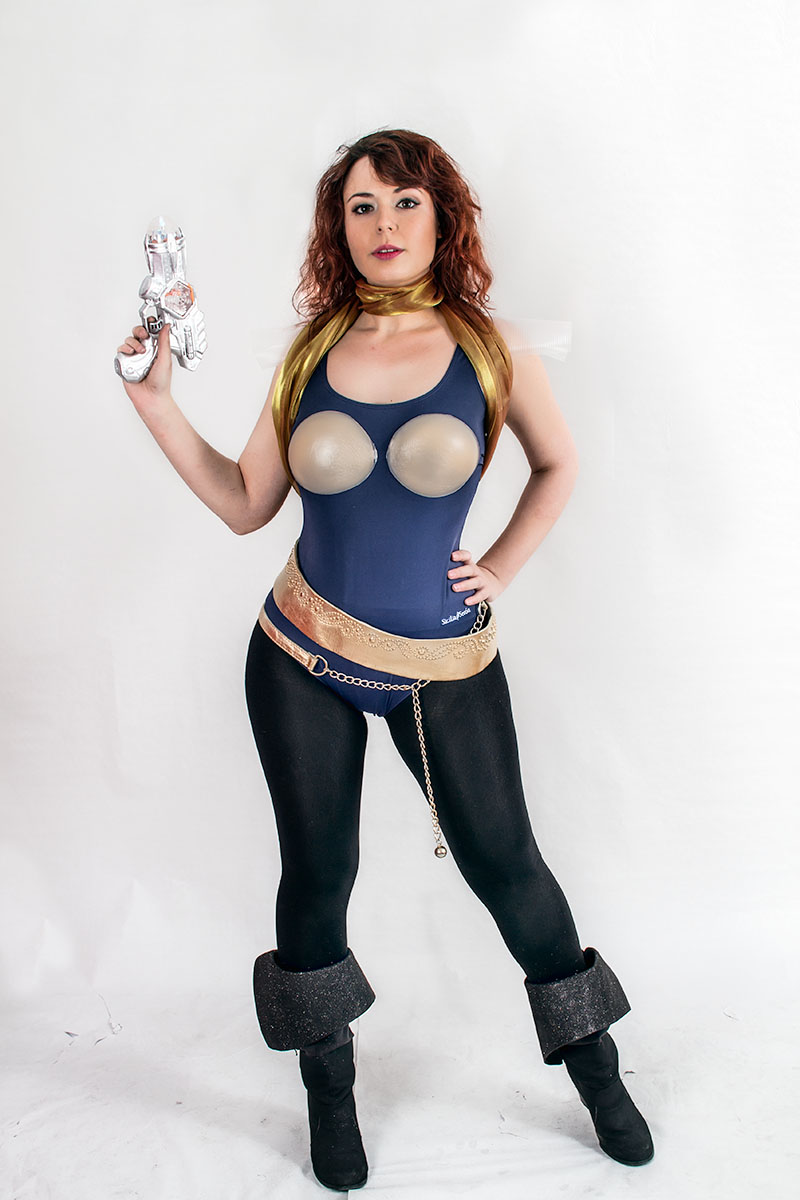
A woman cosplaying as Barbarella. Author Jerry Lembcke noted that Barbarella's popularity went beyond the film buff community.

Barbarella and Danger: Diabolik were both part of a minor trend of Italian film adaptations of European comics (known in Italy as fumetti) that emphasized mild sadomasochism and late-1960s fetish gear; aside from these two films, 1968 saw the release of Piero Vivarelli's similarly themed Satanik. These were followed by Bruno Corbucci's Ms. Stiletto in 1969, and Corrado Farina's Baba Yaga in 1973. The production and costume design of both films also reflected a larger movement of retrofuturism seen in European genre films of the 1960s and 1970s. These include Pasquale Festa Campanile's The Libertine and Check to the Queen, Umberto Lenzi's So Sweet... So Perverse, Tinto Brass' Col cuore in gola, Lucio Fulci's One on Top of the Other and A Lizard in a Woman's Skin, Elio Petri's The 10th Victim, Piero Schivazappa's The Laughing Woman and Radley Metzger's Camille 2000 and The Lickerish Quartet.

According to the Los Angeles Times, Barbarella may seem "quaint" to modern audiences but its "imagery has echoed for years in pop culture." Lisa Eisner of The New York Times called Barbarella "the most iconic sex goddess of the '60s." The film's costumes influenced Jean-Paul Gaultier's designs in The Fifth Element, and Gaultier noted Paco Rabanne's metallic dress that was worn by Fonda.

Barbarella was later called a cult film. Author Jerry Lembcke noted the film's popularity; it was available in small video stores, and was familiar beyond the film buff community. According to Lembcke, any "doubt about its cult status was dispelled when Entertainment Weekly ranked it number 40 on its list of top 50 cult movies" in 2003. He cited the film's popularity on the internet, with fansites ranging from a Barbarella festival in Sweden to memorabilia sales and reviews. Lembcke writes that the websites focus on the character of Barbarella.

Barbarella has influenced popular music, with English new wave band Duran Duran taking its name from the film's antagonist. The group later released a 1984 concert film, Arena (An Absurd Notion), with Milo O'Shea reprising his role from Barbarella. Their 1981 debut album is titled Duran Duran, and in 1997, they released the song "Electric Barbarella", again taking inspiration from the film.

The musical duo Matmos as well as the British lighting company Mathmos took their name from the evil lake of sentient lava under the city of the Sogo. Music videos influenced by Barbarella include Kylie Minogue's "Put Yourself in My Place", Katy Perry's "E.T.", and Ariana Grande's "Break Free", and Clutch's "In Walks Barbarella".

=== Proposed sequel, remake and TV series ===
A sequel to Barbarella was planned in November 1968. Producer Robert Evans said that its working title would be Barbarella Goes Down, with the character having undersea adventures. Terry Southern said that he was contacted by de Laurentiis in 1990 to write a sequel "on the cheap ... but with plenty of action and plenty of sex", and possibly starring Fonda's daughter.

A new version of Barbarella was proposed in the 2000s, and director Robert Rodriguez was interested in developing a version after the release of Sin City. Universal Pictures planned to produce the film, with Rose McGowan playing Barbarella. Dino and Martha De Laurentiis signed on with writers Neal Purvis and Robert Wade, who had worked on Casino Royale. When the film's budget exceeded $80 million, Universal withdrew. According to Rodriguez, he did not want his film to look like Vadim's. He searched for alternate financing when Universal did not meet his budget, and found a studio in Germany which would provide a $70 million budget. Rodriguez eventually left the project, since using that studio would require a long separation from his family. Joe Gazzam was then approached to write a screenplay, with Robert Luketic directing and Dino and Martha De Laurentiis still credited as producers.

Gaumont International Television announced a pilot for a TV series based on the film by Amazon Studios in 2012. The pilot would be written by Purvis and Wade and directed by Nicolas Winding Refn, and the series would be set in Asia. Refn spoke about the show in 2016 where he discussed about having a greater interest on developing The Neon Demon than Barbarella, concluding that "certain things are better left untouched. You don't need to remake everything."

Sony Pictures announced development on a new version of Barbarella in 2022. Sydney Sweeney is set to star as the titular character as well as executive produce. In 2024, Edgar Wright signed on to direct, with Jane Goldman and Honey Ross attached to write the script. When Fonda was asked her thoughts of this remake, she responded with simply "Good Luck".

== See also ==
- List of cult films
- List of films based on French-language comics
- List of French films of 1968
- List of Italian films of 1968
- List of science fiction films of the 1960s

== Bibliography ==
- Bartkowiak, Matthew J.; Kiuchi, Yuya (2015). The Music of Counterculture Cinema: A Critical Study of 1960s and 1970s Soundtracks. McFarland. ISBN 978-0786475421.
- Bosworth, Patricia (2011). Jane Fonda: The Private Life of a Public Woman. Houghton Mifflin Harcourt. ISBN 978-0547504476.
- Conrad, Dean (2018). Space Sirens, Scientists and Princesses: The Portrayal of Women in Science Fiction Cinema. McFarland. ISBN 9781476632711.
- Curti, Roberto (2016). Diabolika: Supercriminals, Superheroes and the Comic Book Universe in Italian Cinema. Midnight Marquee Press. ISBN 978-1-936168-60-6.
- Gerber, Gail; Lisanti, Gail (2014). Trippin' with Terry Southern: What I Think I Remember. McFarland. ISBN 978-0786487271.
- Hughes, Howard (2011). Cinema Italiano: The Complete Guide from Classics to Cult. I.B.Tauris. ISBN 978-0-85773-044-2.
- Hughes, Howard (2014). Outer Limits: The Filmgoers' Guide to the Great Science-Fiction Films. I.B.Tauris. ISBN 978-0857734754.
- Lembcke, Jerry (2010). Hanoi Jane: War, Sex, & Fantasies of Betrayal. University of Massachusetts Press. ISBN 978-1558498150.
- Lisanti, Tom (1 January 2003). Drive-in Dream Girls: A Galaxy of B-movie Starlets of the Sixties. McFarland. ISBN 978-0-7864-1575-5. Archived from the original on 20 March 2017.
- Lucas, Tim (2007). Mario Bava: All the Colors of the Dark. Video Watchdog. ISBN 978-0-9633756-1-2.
- Lucas, Tim (May–July 1994). "Laserdiscs: Barbarella, Queen of the Galaxy". Video Watchdog. No. 23.
- McGilligan, Patrick (1997). Backstory 3: Interviews with Screenwriters of the 60s. University of California Press. ISBN 0520204271.
- Newman, Kim (2011). Nightmare Movies: Horror on Screen Since the 1960s. Bloomsbury Publishing. ISBN 978-1-4088-1750-6.
- Parks, Lisa (1999). "Bringing Barbarella Down to Earth". In Radner, Hilary; Luckett, Moya (eds.). Swinging Single: Representing Sexuality in the 1960s. University of Minnesota Press. ISBN 0816633517.
- Spencer, Kristopher (2008). Film and Television Scores, 1950-1979: A Critical Survey by Genre. McFarland. ISBN 978-0786452286.
- Taylor, Andy (2008). Wild Boy: My Life in Duran Duran. Grand Central Publishing. ISBN 978-0-446-54606-5.
- Willis, Donald, ed. (1985). Variety's Complete Science Fiction Reviews. Garland Publishing Inc. ISBN 0-8240-6263-9.
