= Jean-Claude Forest =

French writer and illustrator

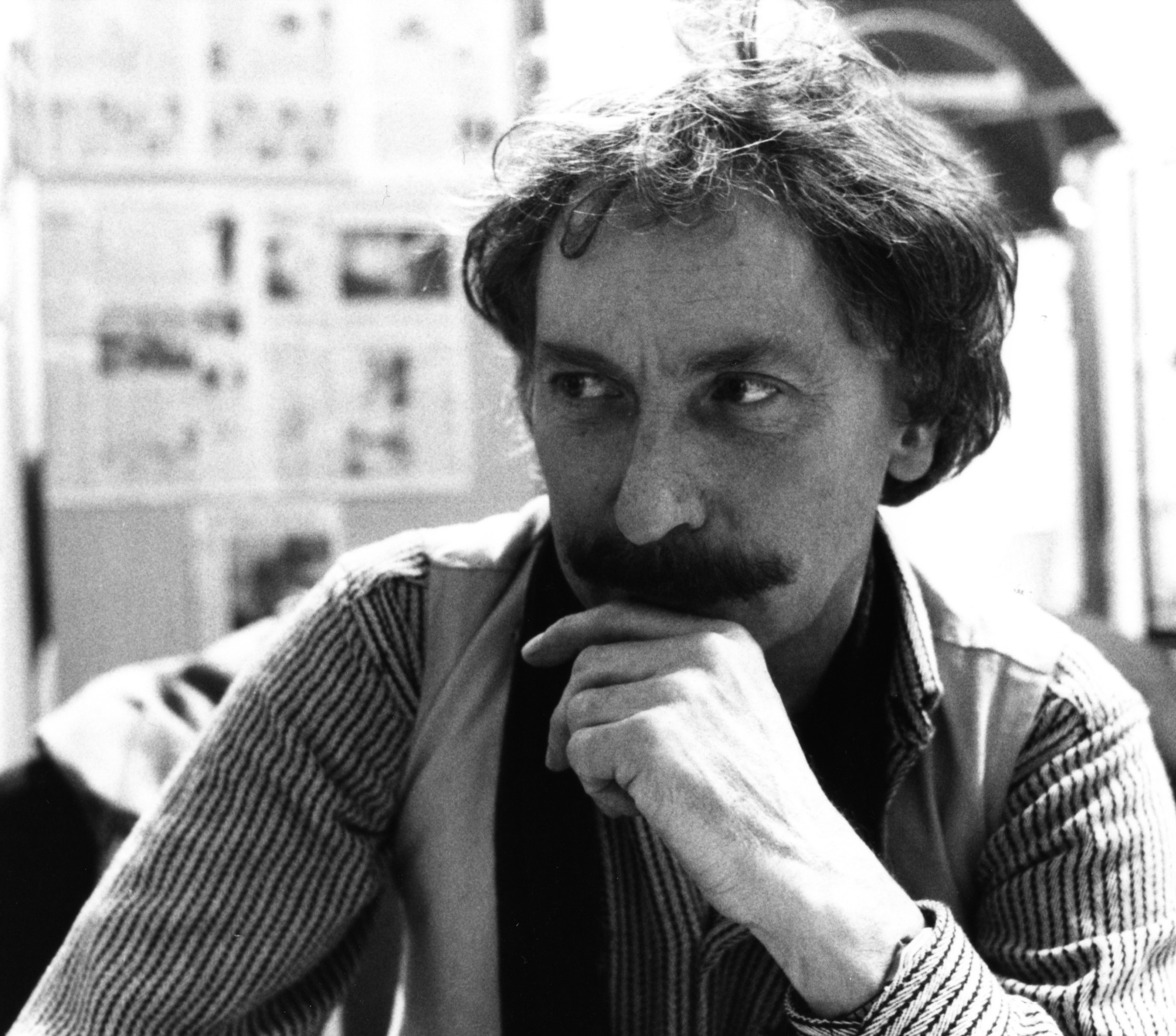
- Image of Jean-Claude Forest
- Born: Jean-Claude Forest; 11 September 1930 Le Perreux-sur-Marne, France
- Died: 30 December 1998 (aged 68) Paris, France
- Areas: Writer, Artist
- Notable works: Barbarella

Jean-Claude Forest (11 September 1930 – 30 December 1998) was a French writer and illustrator of comics and the creator of character Barbarella.

== Biography ==
Jean-Claude Forest was born in Le Perreux-sur-Marne, a Paris suburb and graduated from the Paris School of Design in the early 1950s and immediately began working as an illustrator.

While at the Paris School of Design Forest drew his first comic strip, Flèche Noire (The Black Arrow). After creating Le Vaisseau Hanté (The Ghost Ship) he illustrated several issues of Charlot, a popular French comic book series loosely based on Charlie Chaplin. Forest eventually became the premier cover artist of French publisher Gallimard's leading French science-fiction paperback imprint, Le Rayon Fantastique, also drawing covers for numerous French newspapers and magazines including France Soir. Together with renowned film director Alain Resnais, Forest was one of the founders of the French Comic-Strip Club in the early 1960s.

Forest became world-famous when he created the sexy sci-fi strip Barbarella, which was originally published in France in V Magazine in 1962. The strip was an immediate bestseller and was soon translated into a dozen languages. In 1967 it was adapted by Terry Southern and Roger Vadim and made into a major motion picture, with Forest acting as design consultant.

Forest created many other cartoons and comic books, also writing scripts for comic strips and for French television.

He was awarded the Grand Prize at the 1984 Angoulême Comics Festival and in Sierre (Switzerland) in 1986.

Jean-Claude Forest suffered from severe asthma for many years and died in 1998 at the age of 68.

== Awards ==
- 1968: Adamson Award for Best International Comic Book Artist, Sweden
- 1980: Best Author at the Angoulême International Comics Festival, France

== Bibliography ==
- Barbarella (originally serialized in V Magazine, 1962; Eric Losfeld, 1964; translated by Grove Press)
- Les Colères du Mange-Minutes [The Wrath of the Minute Eater] (Kesselring, 1974)
- Le Semble-Lune [The False Moon] (Horay, 1977; transl. as Barbarella & The Moon Child, Heavy Metal)
- Le Miroir aux Tempêtes [The Storm Mirror] (originally serialized in "L'Écho des savanes", 1981; Albin Michel, 1982)
- Bébé Cyanure [Baby Cyanide] (originally serialized in "Chouchou", 1964; Glénat, 1975)
- Charlot a de la Chance [Charlot Is Lucky] (SPE, 1953)
- Charlot et les Mammouths [The Mastodons] (SPE, 1954)
- Charlot contre Mandrago Satanas [Charlot vs. Mandrago Satanas] (SPE, 1954)
- Charlot Chercheur d'Uranium [Charlot Uranium Prospector] (SPE, 1955)
- Charlot dans le Grands Monde [Charlot in High Society] (SPE, 1955)
- Charlot Chevalier de la Table Ronde [Knight of the Round Table] (SPE, 1956)
- Charlot dans les Affaires [Charlot in Business] (SPE, 1956)
- Charlot se Débrouille [Charlot Manages] (SPE, 1958)
- Charlot Pionnier Interplanétaire [Interplanetary Pioneer] (SPE, 1960)
- Charlot et les Robots [The Robots] (SPE, 1961)
- Charlot Gagne un Royaume [Charlot Wins A Kingdom] (SPE, 1962)
- Hippolyte et les Diamants de Pesetas-City [Hippolyte & The Diamonds of Pesetas City] (Editions ELAN, date unknown, early 1950s?)
- Enfants, c'est l'Hydragon qui Passe [Children, Watch The Hydragon Go By] (originally serialized in "À Suivre", 1983; Casterman, 1984)
- Hypocrite et le Monstre du Loch Ness [Hypocrite and the Loch Ness Monster] (originally serialized in "France Soir", 1971; Serg, 1971)
- Mystérieuse Matin, Midi et Soir [Mysterious Morning, Noon and Evening] (originally serialized in "Linus" and "Pif", 1971; Dargaud, 1972)
- Comment Décoder l'Étircopyh [How To Decode Etircopyh] (originally serialized in "Pilote", 1972; Dargaud, 1973)
- N'Importe Quoi de Cheval [Anything But Horses] (originally serialized in "Pilote", 1973; Dargaud, 1974)
- Ici Même [Same Here] (originally serialized in "À Suivre", 1978; Casterman, 1979)
- La Jonque Fantôme Vue de l'Orchestre (originally serialized in "À Suivre", 1980; Casterman, 1981)
- Il Faut y Croire pour le Voir [You Must Believe It To See It] (Dargaud, 1996)
- Les Naufragés du Temps [The Castaways in Time, translated as Lost in Time]
  - 1. L'Etoile Endormie [The Sleeping Star] (originally serialized in "Chouchou"; 1964; Hachette, 1974)
  - 2. La Mort Sinueuse [The Creeping Death] (originally serialized in "Chouchou"; 1964; Hachette, 1975)
  - 3. Labyrinthes [Labyrinths] (Hachette, 1976; translated by NBM)
  - 4. L'Univers Cannibale [The Cannibal Universe] (Hachette, 1976)
- Le Roman de Renart [The Novel of Renart] (Futuropolis, 1985)
- Tiroirs de Poche et Fonds de Tiroirs [Pocket Drawers & Bottom of Drawers] (Horay, 1976)
