= Electric Barbarella =

Single by Duran Duran

from the album Medazzaland
- B-side: "Girls on Film" (Tin Tin Out remix); "Out of My Mind"; "Sinner and Saint"
- Released: 16 September 1997
- Genre: Electronica; pop
- Length: 5:16 (album version); 4:15 (radio edit)
- Label: Capitol; EMI
- Songwriters: Nick Rhodes; Warren Cuccurullo; Simon Le Bon
- Producer: TV Mania

Duran Duran singles chronology
"Out of My Mind" (1997)	"Electric Barbarella" (1997)	"Someone Else Not Me" (2000)

Music video
- "Electric Barbarella" on YouTube

"Electric Barbarella" is a song by the English pop rock band Duran Duran from their ninth studio album, Medazzaland (1997). The song was released in the United States to contemporary hit radio by Capitol Records on 16 September 1997, followed by its digital release through Capitol's website and retail release on 23 September. "Electric Barbarella" was not available in the United Kingdom until its inclusion on the band's 1998 compilation album Greatest, after which it was released as a single in the country on 18 January 1999.

== Background ==
"Electric Barbarella" is a direct tribute to the 1968 Roger Vadim film Barbarella, from which a character named Durand Durand inspired the band's name. It is considered as the first ever single by a major label artist available for digital purchase/download on the internet.

== Music video ==
The video, directed by photographer Ellen von Unwerth, involved a robot sex doll played by American model Myka Dunkle. Simon Le Bon stated during an interview with Carson Daly on Total Request Live that von Unwerth specifically requested to use Dunkle, despite the fact that the band had other models and friends (including Devon Aoki and Sophie Dahl, both of whom appear in the video's party scene) in mind, due to her background as a dancer, and her ability to "do the mime that would actually make her appear to be a robot." The video had to be mildly censored before receiving airplay on MTV or VH1; by the time the modified video was delivered, the song had already fallen off the charts.

== B-sides, bonus tracks and remixes ==
The B-sides for individual "Electric Barbarella" releases included remixes of previously released singles, such as "Girls on Film" or "Out of My Mind". Numerous remixes of the track were also issued on various promo releases and on the internet as well.

== Formats and track listings ==
=== 12": EMI / 12ELEC 2000 United Kingdom ===
1. "Electric Barbarella" (Tee's club mix) – 5:54
2. "Electric Barbarella" (Electric Sex mix) – 5:02
3. "Girls on Film" (Salt Tank mix) – 6:27
- Released in November 1998

=== CD: EMI / CDELEC 2000 United Kingdom ===
1. "Electric Barbarella" (radio edit) – 4:15
2. "Girls on Film" (Tin Tin Out radio mix) – 4:51
3. "Electric Barbarella" (Tee's radio mix) – 4:05
- Released in November 1998

=== MC: EMI / TCELEC 2000 United Kingdom ===
1. "Electric Barbarella" (radio edit) – 4:15
2. "Girls on Film" (Tin Tin Out radio mix) – 4:51
3. "Electric Barbarella" (Tee's radio mix) – 4:05

=== 7": Capitol / S7-724381972175 United States ===
1. "Electric Barbarella" (album version) – 5:19
2. "Out of My Mind" (album version) – 4:20

=== 12": Capitol / Y 7243 8 58674 15 United States ===
1. "Electric Barbarella" (Tee's club mix) – 5:54
2. "Electric Barbarella" (Tee's dance mix) – 6:16
3. "Electric Barbarella" (All Fired Up mix) – 7:12
4. "Electric Barbarella" (Barbarella bonus beats) – 4:49

=== 12": Capitol / SPRO 12098 (Promo) United States ===
1. "Electric Barbarella" (Tee's club mix) – 5:41
2. "Electric Barbarella" (Tee's Speed dub) – 6:15
3. "Electric Barbarella" (Tee's dance mix) – 6:03
4. "Electric Barbarella" (TNT In-House mix) – 5:12
5. "Electric Barbarella" (Tee's capella) – 2:11
- US promo 12" labelled "Todd Terry Remixes"

=== 12": Capitol / SPRO 7087 6 12098 15 (Promo) United States ===
1. "Electric Barbarella" (Tee's dance mix) – 6:03
2. "Electric Barbarella" (TNT In-House mix) – 5:12
3. "Electric Barbarella" (Tee's capella) – 2:11
4. "Electric Barbarella" (Tee's club mix) – 5:41
5. "Electric Barbarella" (Tee's Speed dub) – 6:15

=== 12": Capitol / SPRO 7087 6 12097 16 (Promo) United States ===
1. "Electric Barbarella" (All Fired Up mix) – 7:12
2. "Electric Barbarella" (Barbarella bonus beats) – 4:49
3. "Electric Barbarella" (album version) – 5:19
4. "Electric Barbarella" (radio edit) – 4:15

=== 12": Harvest / SPRO 7087 6 12085 11 (Promo) United States ===
1. "Electric Barbarella" (Electric Sex remix) – 5:02
2. "Electric Barbarella" (Electric Sex instrumental remix) – 5:04
3. "Electric Barbarella" (The Americruiser remix) – 6:17
4. "Electric Barbarella" (Yo Shorty Americruiser remix) – 5:05

=== CD: Capitol / C2 7243 8 58674 0 8 United States ===
1. "Electric Barbarella" (album version) – 5:15
2. "Electric Barbarella" (Tee's club mix) – 5:41
3. "Electric Barbarella" (All Fired Up mix) – 7:09
4. "Out of My Mind" (Perfecto mix) – 5:51
5. "Sinner and Saint" – 4:12
6. "Electric Barbarella Video" (director's cut) – 5:01
- Track 6 is in Quicktime format, 320x240, Apple Cinepak codec

=== Digital download ===
1. "Electric Barbarella" (Internet-only mix) – 4:20 [Dom T. remix edit]
2. "Electric Barbarella" (Dom T remix) – 7:08
- First commercially downloadable song; sold for 99 cents

== Media references ==
The cosmetics company Hard Candy was preparing to launch a colour of nail polish named "Electric Barbarella" at the same time the single was released, but had to halt it because the proper permissions had not been received from the owners of the Barbarella name.

== Chart positions ==
The song was released on 16 September in the United States, and peaked at No. 52 on the Billboard Hot 100 on 1 November and one year later reached No. 23 in UK singles charts. Due to the debacle over its download release, temporary censoring of the music video and late release to other markets the single is generally considered to have under-performed.

== Release history ==
Release dates and formats for "Electric Barbarella"
Region	Date	Format(s)	Label(s)	Ref.
United States	16 September 1997	Contemporary hit radio	Capitol	
United States	23 September 1997	CD; digital download	Capitol	
United Kingdom	18 January 1999	12-inch vinyl; CD; cassette	EMI	

== Personnel ==
Duran Duran

- Nick Rhodes – keyboards
- Simon Le Bon – vocals
- Warren Cuccurullo – guitar, bass

Additional musicians

- Anthony J. Resta – live drums
- Clem Burke – live drum fill
