= Guy Peellaert =

Belgian artist (1934–2008)

- Born: 6 April 1934 Brussels, Belgium
- Died: 17 November 2008 (aged 74) Paris, France
- Areas: Cartoonist, Artist
- Notable works: The Adventures of Jodelle (1966) Diamond Dogs (1974); It's Only Rock 'n Roll (1974); Taxi Driver (1976); Paris, Texas (1984) Wings of Desire (1988)

Guy Peellaert (6 April 1934 – 17 November 2008) was a Belgian artist, painter, illustrator, comic artist and photographer, most famous for the book Rock Dreams, and his album covers for rock artists like David Bowie (Diamond Dogs) and the Rolling Stones (It's Only Rock 'n Roll). He also designed film posters for films like Taxi Driver (1976), Paris, Texas (1984), and Short Cuts (1993). The band Frankie Goes to Hollywood took their name from Peellaert's painting, titled Frank Sinatra, which featured the headline "Frankie Goes Hollywood".

== Early life ==
Peellaert was born into an aristocratic family, but left home at an early age. He studied fine arts in Brussels, and became heavily influenced by American and British pop culture, film noir and pulp literature, before making his debut as a decorator for theaters and comic strip artist.

== Career ==
Guy Peellaert's design for David Bowie's Diamond Dogs album

Peellaert's style was influenced by psychedelic art and pop art. He moved to Paris, where he worked variously in advertising, set design for the casino and the Crazy Horse nightclub, film and television. His comic strip, Les Aventures de Jodelle, was published in 1966 in the controversial French magazine Hara-Kiri. The protagonist, Jodelle, was modelled after singer Sylvie Vartan. A year later in 1967 he made his second pop art comic book Pravda, also prepublished in Hara Kiri. The main character of this book is based on Françoise Hardy.

In 1973, he collaborated with British rock journalist Nik Cohn on the best-selling book Rock Dreams, which reportedly sold a million copies after it was published the following year. The book consisted of Peellaert's visual illustrations which celebrated and exaggerated the rebel heritage of pop music and, particularly, rock and roll, with commentary by Cohn. Many of the original artworks were bought by actor Jack Nicholson.

After the success of Rock Dreams, Peellaert became perhaps best known for his rock album covers. He designed covers for The Rolling Stones (It's Only Rock 'n' Roll), David Bowie (Diamond Dogs), Étienne Daho (Pour nos vies martiennes), Lio (Wandatta), and others.

He painted in a very photorealistic style and often used pastel. The album cover of David Bowie's Diamond Dogs (1974) met with controversy. The cover art features Bowie as a striking half-man, half-dog grotesque. It was controversial as the full painting clearly showed the hybrid's genitalia. Very few copies of this original cover made their way into circulation at the time of the album's release. According to the record-collector publication Goldmine price guides, these albums have been among the most expensive record collectibles of all time, as high as thousands of US dollars for a single copy. The genitalia were quickly airbrushed out for the 1974 LP's gatefold sleeve. The original, unedited artwork appeared in a double-page spread of the June 1974 issue of Creem magazine and later appeared on several re-releases of the album.

Peellaert also created another painting for the Diamond Dogs album, which reproduces a photograph taken for the album by Terry O'Neill. It depicts Bowie in a cordobes hat, holding on to the leash of a leaping Great Dane dog. The painting placed the scene within a skyline of skyscrapers that fit within the album's theme of a future city.

The painting was intended for the inner gatefold of the Diamond Dogs album but was rejected for the same reason as Peellaert's other painting for the album, its depiction of the Mastiff's genitalia.

Instead, in 1974, when the Diamond Dogs album was first released, it was printed as a 17.5" × 32", lithographic poster, by Mainman, the production company established in 1972 by David Bowie's manager, Tony Defries. It was only available for a few years by direct sale and only through Mainman's Bowie fan club. As such, the poster is quite rare and valuable. A copy is held in the collection of the New York City's Museum of Modern Art (object # 177.2012).

Peellaert also designed film posters for films like Taxi Driver (by Martin Scorsese), Short Cuts (by Robert Altman), L'argent (by Robert Bresson), Paris, Texas and Wings of Desire (by Wim Wenders) He also designed programme titles for television shows on the French TV channel Antenne 2 in 1982.

Peellaert and Cohn collaborated again on 20th-Century Dreams in 1999, with illustrations of political and world historical figures.

His work has been exhibited internationally and magazines like Les Inrockuptibles, The Guardian and Vanity Fair have praised his work.

== Death ==
Peellaert died at the age of 74 of cancer.

== Bibliography ==
- Jodelle, 1966 (English reprint by Fantagraphics in 2013)
- Pravda, 1968
- Rock Dreams, 1973
- The Big Room, 1986
