= Positif (magazine) =

French film magazine

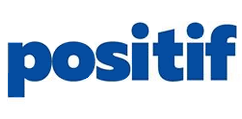
- Editor: Michel Ciment
- Categories: Film
- Frequency: Monthly
- Founded: 1952; 74 years ago
- Country: France
- Based in: Paris
- Website: revue-positif.com

Positif is a French film magazine, founded in 1952 by Bernard Chardère in Lyon. It is one of two major French-language film magazines, created several months after Les Cahiers du cinéma. The magazine is headquartered in Paris and is published monthly.

Traditionally, Positif has served as a counterpoint to Les Cahiers du cinéma, focusing on film themes and scripts, in contrast to politics and aesthetics. In the 1950s, Positif was associated with the non-Communist left (while Les Cahiers du cinéma originally held political affiliations with the right). Today, Positif is a neutral publication run by volunteers.

The magazine was edited by Éric Losfeld from 1959. After publishing an article about Orson Welles in 1963, Michel Ciment became a member of the magazine's editorial committee. In 1966, he was promoted to editor in chief, a post he held until his death.

Positif has been printed by different publishers throughout the years and is currently published by Actes Sud in collaboration with the Institut Lumière.

== See also ==
- List of film periodicals
