= The Adventures of Phoebe Zeit-Geist =

American comic series

Panels from the comics series "The Adventures of Phoebe Zeit-Geist"

"The Adventures of Phoebe Zeit-Geist" is an American comics series, written by Michael O'Donoghue and drawn by Frank Springer. From January 1965, it was serialized in the magazine Evergreen Review, and later published in book form as a Grove Press hardcover in 1968 and trade paperback in 1969. It was reissued as a trade paperback in 1986 (Ken Pierce Books, ISBN 0-912277-34-3, ISBN 978-0-912277-34-9).

== Plot ==
The comic detailed the adventures of debutante Phoebe Zeit-Geist as she was variously kidnapped and rescued by a series of bizarre characters, such as Nazis, Chinese foot fetishists, and lesbian assassins.

== Impact ==
Doonesbury comic-strip creator Garry Trudeau cited the strip as an early inspiration, saying: "[A] very heavy influence was a serial in the Sixties called 'Phoebe Zeitgeist' ... It was an absolutely brilliant, deadpan send-up of adventure comics, but with a very edgy modernist kind of approach. To this day, I hold virtually every panel in my brain. It's very hard not to steal from it".
