= Barbarella (comics) =

French science fiction comic book series

- Barbarella: Le Semble-Lune (1977) published by Pierre Horay; cover art by Jean-Claude Forest

Character information
- Created by: Jean-Claude Forest

Publication information
- Publisher: Dynamite Entertainment (2017–present)
Title(s)
V Magazine
Evergreen Review #37-39
Heavy Metal (vol. 1) #11
(vol. 2) #3
- Formats: Original material for the series has been published as a strip in the comics anthology(s) V Magazine, Evergreen Review and Heavy Metal and a set of graphic novels.
- Genre: Erotic, science fiction
- Publication date: 1962–1978
- Number of issues: (Dynamite – vol. 1): 13; (Dynamite – vol. 2): 10

Creative team
- Writer(s): Jean-Claude Forest Mike Carey Sarah Hoyt
- Artist(s): Jean-Claude Forest Kenan Yarar Madibek Musabekov

Reprints
- The series has been reprinted, at least in part, in English.

Barbarella is a fictional heroine in a French science fiction comic book created by Jean-Claude Forest.

== History ==
Jean-Claude Forest created the character of Barbarella for serialization in the French V Magazine in spring 1962. In 1964 Éric Losfeld published these strips as a stand-alone book titled Barbarella. The book caused a scandal and became known as the first "adult" (erotic) comic book, though American pornographic comic books known as "Tijuana bibles" had long predated it. For her creator, the character embodied the modern, emancipated woman in the era of sexual liberation, and as a result, this literary work has come to be associated with the mid-20th century sexual revolution. The comic would stop publishing in 1978.

Barbarella was relaunched as an ongoing series by the American publisher Dynamite Entertainment in December 2017. The creative team included writer Mike Carey and artist Kenan Yarar. The comic would be supervised by Jean-Marc Lofficier, who worked with the original creator. It ran for 12 issues with a holiday special.

Another relaunch was announced in May 2021, with writer Sarah Hoyt and artist Madibek Musabekov. This run continued for 10 issues.

After the announcement of a movie remake, Dynamite announced in November 2022 it would relaunch the comic with the title Barbarella: The Center Cannot Hold. Sarah Hoyt would return as writer, this time joined by artist Riccardo Bogani. In July 2024, a new series was announced with writer Blake Northcott and artist Anna Morozova. This iteration of the comic will return more closely to Jean-Claude Forest's concept for the original comic series.

== Characters ==
- Barbarella: a young woman who travels from planet to planet and has numerous adventures, often involving sex. The aliens she meets often seduce her, and she also experiments with a "machine excessive" or "orgasmatron".
- Professor Ping: a one-eyed old man who helps Barbarella.
- Pygar: a blind 'angel' guided by Barbarella, he is the last of the ornithanthropes (bird-men).
- La Reine noire (The Black Queen): a villainess who reigns in the maze-surrounded town of Sogo on the planet Lythion.
- Lio: a brown-haired teenage girl saved by Barbarella; she must save the town governed by her father in Les Colères du mange-minutes.
- Mado: a fembot sex worker whose "breakdown" Barbarella repairs.
- Narval: an aiguiote (aquatic man) who comes from Citerne IV to complete his scientific research in Les Colères du mange-minutes.
- L'artiste: a self-insert of Jean-Claude Forest. Named Browningwell in Le Semble-Lune, he and Barbarella have a child together.

== Bibliography ==
- Barbarella (originally serialized in V Magazine, 1962; book by Éric Losfeld, 1964)
- Les Colères du Mange-Minutes [The Wrath of the Minute Eater] (Kesselring, 1974)
- Le Semble-Lune [The False Moon] (Horay, 1977, ISBN 2-7058-0045-X)
- Le Miroir aux Tempêtes [The Storm Mirror] (Albin Michel, 1982, art by Daniel Billon, ISBN 2-226-01441-1)

The stories have been reprinted by Dargaud and Les Humanoïdes Associés.

Barbarella also guest-stars in Mystérieuse, Matin, Midi et Soir [Mysterious, Morning, Noon And Evening] (originally serialized in Pif, 1971; book edition by Serg, 1972)

Barbarella was translated into English by Richard Seaver and published in Evergreen Review #37-39 (1965–1966) and Heavy Metal (vol. 1) #11 through (vol. 2) #3 (1978), as well as the trade paperback Barbarella: The Moon Child (HM Communications, Inc., 1978).

An updated adaptation of Book 1 was released by Humanoids Publishing on September 24, 2020; this new adaptation was done by Kelly Sue DeConnick. Book 2 saw its first English adaptation in January 2015 by DeConnick from Humanoids as well.

PUBLICATION	PUBLISHER	WRITER	ARTIST	COLLECTED EDITION
Barbarella (1-12) (2017-2018)	Dynamite Entertainment	Mike Carey	Kenan Yarar	Barbarella Vol. 1: Red Hot Gospel (2018); Barbarella Vol. 2: Hard Labor (2019); Barbarella Vol. 3: Burning Down the House (2019)
Barbarella Holiday Special (2018)	Dynamite Entertainment	Jean-Marc Lofficier	Jose Louis Ruiz Perez	uncollected
Barbarella/Dejah Thoris (1-4) (2019)	Dynamite Entertainment	Leah Williams	Germán Garcia	Barbarella/Dejah Thoris Vol. 1 (2019)
Barbarella Vol. 2 (1-10) (2021-2022)	Dynamite Entertainment	Sarah Hoyt	Madibek Musabekov	Barbarella: Woman Untamed Vol. 1 (2023); Barbarella: Woman Untamed Vol. 2 (2024)
Barbarella: The Center Cannot Hold (1-5) (2023)	Dynamite Entertainment	Sarah Hoyt	Riccardo Bogani	Barbarella: Woman Untamed Vol. 3 (2025)
Barbarella Vol. 3 (1-5) (2024-2025)	Dynamite Entertainment	Blake Northcott	Anna Morozova	Barbarella: Stardust and Subversion (2026)

== Adaptations ==
- A Barbarella film adaptation was made in 1968, directed by Roger Vadim and starring Jane Fonda. Several remakes were considered with Bridget Fonda, Drew Barrymore, Sherilyn Fenn and Rose McGowan, the most recent of which was abandoned in 2009.
- A Barbarella musical based on the comics was produced in 2004.
- A Barbarella TV series was in development with writers Neal Purvis and Robert Wade, filmmaker Nicolas Winding Refn, and Martha De Laurentiis, widow of the film's producer Dino De Laurentiis, all involved. In May 2013, Refn said to Vulture that they are still writing and are going back to the original comics. As of May 2013, no one has been cast for the series yet.
- In 2017, Dynamite Entertainment announced they had acquired the license to create new comics based on Barbarella. A twelve issue series written by Mike Carey with art by Kenan Yarar was published by Dynamite during 2017 and 2018, in conjunction with Barbarella's 55th anniversary. Jean-Marc Lofficier, longtime custodian of the Barbarella character, joined Carey as supervisor on the project. The single-shot Barbarella Holiday Special was published in December 2018, written by Locifier with art by José Louis Ruiz Pérez. Barbarella/Dejah Thoris was a four issue series published in 2019, uniting Barbarella with Edgar Rice Burroughs' Princess of Barsoom. It was written by Leah Williams with art by Germán Garcia. In July 2021, Dynamite launched a new ongoing series written by Sarah A. Hoyt with art by Madibek Musabekov.
- On October 11, 2022, Deadline reported that a film is planned, with Sydney Sweeney set to star as the titular character and serve as executive producer. Due to this, a new comic series will be released in 2023.

== In popular culture ==
- 1980s British pop band Duran Duran takes its name from a character in the 1968 film Barbarella: Barbarella's mission in the film is to find a scientist named Durand Durand (pronounced "Duran Duran"). In addition, the band's first single from 1997's Medazzaland is entitled "Electric Barbarella".
- Belgian pop singer and actress Lio took this stage name from a character in the Barbarella comic books.
- American rock band Clutch details a meet-up between the singer and Barbarella in which a Motel 6 is destroyed, among other exploits, in their song "In Walks Barbarella".
- Scott Weiland's only single from his debut album 12 Bar Blues is titled "Barbarella" as an homage to the iconic character.
- Commander Cody's song "Dreams of Barbarella", from his 1978 album Flying Dreams, details a man's descent into a fantasy world where he lives with Barbarella, in a magic ship out by the Milky Way.

== Reception ==
Barbarella has been criticized for being dated and sexist. Barbarella has also been described as a sex symbol.

== Sources ==
- Favari, Pietro (1996), Le nuvole parlanti: un secolo di fumetti tra arte e mass media.
