= Music for Mechanics =

Publication information
- Publisher: Fantagraphics
- Genre: Alternative comics
- Publication date: October 1985

Creative team
- Written by: Los Bros Hernandez [Gilbert, Jaime & Mario Hernandez]
- Artist: Los Bros Hernandez

Music for Mechanics is the first sequential collection of the American comic book series Love and Rockets by the Hernandez brothers and published in 1985.

The cover of the book is by Jaime Hernandez and the preface by Carter Scholz.

== Contents ==
These first stories, dated 1981–1985, are science-fiction oriented, adding monsters and dinosaurs and extra-terrestrials to the first latino themes, and some stories and themes may or may not be considered canon with the universes developed by the brothers in later books.

No.	Title	Author	Pages	Comments
1.	Mechan-X	Jaime Hernandez	8	Signed "Izzy Ruebens"; introducing characters Maggie and Hopey.
2.	Locas Tambien	Jaime	4
3.	How to Kill a	Jaime	4	Signed "Isabel Ruebens"; not listed in the "Contents" of the book.
4.	BEM	Gilbert Hernandez	40	5 parts; introducing character Luba).
5.	Barrio Huerta	Jaime	1
6.	Penny Century, You're Fired	Jaime	1
7.	Music for Monsters I	Gilbert	6
8.	Mecanicos	Jaime	6
9.	Mechanics	Jaime	41	Introducing wrestling.
10.	Radio Zero	Gilbert	10
11.	Music for Monsters II	Gilbert	4
12.	Somewhere in California	Mario Hernandez	10
13.	A Little Story	Gilbert	6	Village of Palomar first appearance, not cited though.
	Cover gallery	Los Bros Hernandez	4

== Chronology ==
Next album: Chelo's Burden
