= Tears from Heaven =

1988 comic book series

- Date: January 1988
- Series: Palomar and Locas
- Publisher: Fantagraphics

Original publication
- Published in: Love and Rockets (Fantagraphics)
- Issues: vol. 1 #5-8, 10-12, and Mechanics #1-2

Chronology
- Preceded by: Las Mujeres Perdidas (1987)
- Followed by: House of Raging Women (1988)

Tears from Heaven is the fourth volume of the American comics series Love and Rockets by the Hernández brothers, Gilbert and Jaime, and published in 1988. It collects stories from Love and Rockets vol. 1 #5-8, 10-12, and Mechanics #1-2.

The cover of the compilation is by Gilbert Hernández, the back cover by Jaime. Gilbert and Jaime's brother, Mario Hernández, does not participate to this book, except for one cover.

== Contents ==
These stories are dated 1983–1988.

No.	Title	Author	Pages	Comments
1.	Tears from Heaven	Gilbert Hernández	15	
2.	Penny Century: On the Road Ag'in	Jaime Hernández	16	
3.	Amor y Cohetes	Jaime	5	Title means "Love and Rockets".
4.	Isidro's Beach	Gilbert	8	
5.	Locas Starring Hopey	Jaime	8	
6.	Slug Fest	Gilbert	5	
7.	Ready Set Go	Gilbert	1	
	Cover Gallery	Mario, Gilbert & Jaime	4	Color part
8.	Locas	Jaime	4	
9.	Ecce Homo	Gilbert	16	
10.	T42	Jaime	3	
11.	Locos	Jaime	4	
12.	Retro Rocky	Jaime	5	
13.	Rocky: Where Are We?	Jaime	3	
14.	Rocky's Birthday	Jaime	14	
15.	The Reticent Heart	Gilbert	11	
16.	The Many Faces of "Big" Danny Chesterfield	Gilbert	4	

== Chronology ==
Previous album: Las Mujeres Perdidas <-> Next album: House of Raging Women.
