= Las Mujeres Perdidas =

Third volume of Love and Rockets

- Date: August 1987
- Series: Palomar and Locas
- Publisher: Fantagraphics

Creative team
- Writers: Los Bros Hernández
- Artists: Los Bros Hernández

Original publication
- Published in: Love and Rockets (Fantagraphics)
- Issues: vol.1 #5-11 and original material

Chronology
- Preceded by: Chelo's Burden (1986)
- Followed by: Tears from Heaven (1988)

Las Mujeres Perdidas (Spanish: The Lost Women) is the third volume of the American comics series Love and Rockets by the Hernández brothers, Gilbert and Jaime, and published in 1987. It collects stories from Love and Rockets vol. 1 #5-11 and original material.

The cover of the compilation is by Jaime Hernández, the back cover by Gilbert. Gilbert and Jaime's brother, Mario Hernández, does not participate to this book.

== Contents ==
These stories are dated 1983–1987. Unlike in the first two volumes, there are no more monsters and extra-terrestrials and science-fiction disappears almost completely.

No.	Title	Author	Pages	Comments
1.	The Lost Women	Jaime Hernández	71	"Las Mujeres Perdidas" means "The Lost Women"; contains many parts.
2.	Fan Letter	Gilbert Hernández	3	
3.	Act of Contrition	Gilbert	33	
4.	Le Contretemps	Gilbert	3	
5.	The Whispering Tree	Gilbert	3	
6.	The Laughing Sun	Gilbert	20	
7.	A Date with Hopey	Jaime	4	
	Cover gallery	Los Bros Hernández	5	

== Chronology ==
Previous album: Chelo's Burden <-> Next album: Tears from Heaven.
