= Chelo's Burden =

1986 graphic novel

Chelo’s Burden
- Date: June 1986
- Series: Palomar and Locas
- Publisher: Fantagraphics

Creative team
- Writers: Los Bros Hernández
- Artists: Los Bros Hernández

Original publication
- Published in: Love and Rockets (Fantagraphics)
- Issues: vol. 1 #3-4, Mechanics #1, and original material

Chronology
- Preceded by: Music for Mechanics (1985)
- Followed by: Las Mujeres Perdidas (1987)

Chelo's Burden is the second album of the American comics series Love and Rockets by the Hernández brothers and published in 1986. It collects stories from Love and Rockets vol. 1 #3-4, Mechanics #1 and original material.

The cover of the compilation is by Gilbert Hernández ("Beto") and the preface by Gary Groth.

== Contents ==
These stories, dated 1982–1986, are, like in the volume #1 Music for Mechanics, still science-fiction oriented, with monsters and extra-terrestrials. The themes of the (Gilbert's) Central-America village of Palomar and (Jaime's) Los Angeles life are more and more present.

No.	Title	Author	Pages	Comments
1.	Sopa de Gran Pena	Gilbert Hernández	51	First "Heartbreak Soup" story, different parts; village of Palomar.
2.	Love and Rockets	Jaime Hernández	2	
3.	Maggie vs. Maniakk	Jaime	9	
4.	Music for Monsters III	Gilbert	4	
5.	Hey Hopey	Jaime	3	
6.	Untitled	Gilbert	1	
7.	100 Rooms	Jaime	32	
8.	Twitch City	Gilbert	6	
9.	Toyo's Request	Jaime	12	
10.	Locas Tambien	Jaime	2	
11.	Somewhere in California	Mario Hernández	15	
12.	Out o' Space	Jaime	6	
13.	Locker Room	Gilbert	1	
	Cover gallery	Los Bros Hernández	5	

== Chronology ==
Previous album: Music for Mechanics <-> Next album: Las Mujeres Perdidas.
