= House of Raging Women =

- Cover of House of Raging Women.
- Date: September 1988
- Series: Palomar and Locas
- Publisher: Fantagraphics

Creative team
- Writers: Los Bros Hernández
- Artists: Los Bros Hernández

Original publication
- Published in: Love and Rockets (Fantagraphics)
- Issues: 13–16

Chronology
- Preceded by: Tears from Heaven (1988)
- Followed by: Duck Feet (1988)

House of Raging Women is the fifth album of the American comics series Love and Rockets by the Hernández brothers, Gilbert and Jaime, and published in 1988. It collects stories originally published in Love and Rockets vol. 1 #13-16 and original material.

The cover of the compilation is by Jaime Hernández (Xaime), the back cover by Gilbert (Beto).

== Contents ==
These stories are dated 1984–1988.

No.	Title	Author	Pages	Comments
1.	La Tona	Jaime Hernández	1	
2.	The Little Monster	Jaime	10	
3.	Queen Rena at 34	Jaime	8	
4.	A True Story	Gilbert Hernández	5	
5.	An American in Palomar	Gilbert	24	
6.	Boys Will Be Boys	Gilbert	6	
7.	Young Locas	Jaime	3	
8.	Locas	Jaime	10	
9.	Locas en las Cabezas	Jaime	6	
10.	Locas at the Beach	Jaime	8	
11.	House of Raging Women	Jaime	14	
12.	Holidays in the Sun	Gilbert	14	
13.	Love Bites	Gilbert	11	
14.	The Adventures of Maggie the Mechanic	Jaime	2	
	Cover gallery	Gilbert and Jaime	5	

== Chronology ==
Previous album: Tears from Heaven <-> Next album: Duck Feet.
