= Human Diastrophism =

Graphic novel by Gilbert Hernández

- Creator: Gilbert Hernández
- Date: 1989
- Series: Palomar
- Publisher: Fantagraphics

Original publication
- Published in: Love and Rockets (Fantagraphics)
- Issues: 21–26
- Date of publication: July 1987 – June 1988

Chronology
- Preceded by: Duck Feet (1988)
- Followed by: Poison River (1994)

Human Diastrophism, also known as Blood of Palomar, is a graphic novel by American cartoonist Gilbert Hernández. It appeared in serialized form in the comic book Love and Rockets in 1987–88, and it first appeared in collected form in 1989 in The Complete Love and Rockets, Volume 8: Blood of Palomar. The story tells of a serial killer in the fictional Latin American village of Palomar, and the political and social implications of the insular villagers' growing contact with the outside world.

== Background and publication ==
Love and Rockets was an alternative comic book begun in the early 1980s (Note: The first self-published issue appeared in 1981; the first Fantagraphics issue from 1982 is an expanded reprint of the self-published issue.) showcasing the work of the Hernández brothers: Mario (b. 1953), Gilbert (b. 1957), and Jaime (b. 1959). The stories featured sensitive portrayals of prominent female and multiethnic characters—especially Latinos—which were uncommon in American comics of the time.

A version of Gilbert's Luba appeared in the first issue, but the character as she was to be known first appeared in his Palomar stories as a strong-willed, hammer-wielding bañadora bathhouse girl, and makes her way to the center of political and social happenings in the fictional Latin American village of Palomar. Hernández gradually took advantage of serialization to broaden his narrative scope; the stories became longer and more ambitious, and Hernández delved more deeply into the backgrounds of his characters and their community, and sociopolitical issues.

Human Diastrophism appeared in Love and Rockets #21–26 (July 1987 – June 1988, and then in a revised and collected form as part of The Complete Love and Rockets, Volume 8: Blood of Palomar from Fantagraphics Books. The story has since appeared in a number of other collections, including the third Heartbreak Soup volume from Titan Books in 1989, titled Human Diastrophism: A Heartbreak Soup Graphic Novel; the Palomar: The Heartbreak Soup Stories in 2003 from Fantagraphics; and in 2007 the fifth volume of the Love and Rockets Library from Fantagraphics, titled Human Diastrophism.

== Synopsis ==
The story weaves several narrative threads in the fictional Central American village of Palomar. An archaeological excavation team that arrives in Palomar brings a forgotten former resident, Tomaso, who begins serial killing. Among the victims are a Swedish archaeologist, the mayor, and his wife.

The schoolteacher Heraclio introduces modern art to the aspiring artist Humberto, whom he finds secretly sketching the locals. This flood of ideas overwhelms Humberto, who feverishly redoubles his artistic efforts. He sketches Tomaso's attempted murder of a local girl, but keeps this discovery to himself. Police discover the sketches and realize Tomaso is the murderer, but a local man, stricken with grief over having murdered his own children, confesses to Tomaso's murders as well. Humberto confounds the investigation by refusing to testify, asserting his "work speaks for itself".

Growing personal anxieties lead Luba, the owner of Palomar's bathhouse, to verbally and physically abuse her eldest of her four daughters, Maricela. Among the archaeological workers, Luba finds Khamo, with whom she has twice had sexual affairs. The pair begin another, cut short when Khamo falls for another woman. At the height of her frustrations, Luba hands over her youngest three daughters to their unknowing biological fathers: Guadalupe to Heraclio, whom Luba had seduced when he was a teenager and whose wife is expecting their own first child; and Doralis and Casimira to Khamo.

Tonantzin, who has a reputation as shallow and sexually promiscuous, has become politically conscious and devotes her energies to preparing for nuclear Armageddon. She takes to dressing in the manner of her indigenous ancestors, which alarms her friends and draws the disapprobation of the locals. Her sister Diana discovers letters to Tonantzin from a prison inmate, Geraldo, who had once held her hostage, (Note: The events are related in the story Duck Feet, originally in Love and Rockets #17–18 (May and July 1986).) and which relate an apocalyptic political vision. She learns Maricela had read the letters to the near-illiterate Tonantzin, and had forged many more of them after Geraldo turned to Christian topics, as she and her secret lover Riri are attracted to Tonantzin and wish to keep her coming back. The pair run away from Palomar to escape Luba's abuse and the prejudice the village would have against their affair.

Waves of destructive monkeys have invaded the village, and the locals have taken to beating them to death. The monkeys destroy the laboratory set up for the murder investigation; this drives the sheriff Chelo to join the monkey hunt, where she accidentally shoots Luba's youngest daughter, Casimira, in the shoulder. A repentant Chelo convinces Luba to run for mayor. Police catch Tomaso attempting to kill Diana, who had spied him trying to kill Humberto. Tomaso impales himself in the neck, but survives and receives a jail sentence.

Khamo comes to sympathize with Tonantzin's cause, and the pair leave Palomar hoping to enact political change around the world. At a demonstration in New York Tonantzin sets herself on fire; she dies, and Khamo suffers severe burns trying to save her. As the story closes, the ghost of Tonantzin as she was before she was radicalized appears and an unexpected ash falls over Palomar.

== Primary characters ==
Carmen
Carmen is Heraclio's wife, with whom she has a son, Tito. She was abandoned on a doorstep as an infant with a note that read "Good riddance". She relates poorly to her husband's level of education, particularly as she has poor literacy.
Carmen accepts the sudden revelation that her husband fathered Luba's second daughter Guadalupea a teenager. She struggles to help Tonantzin and "unbrainwash" her of the political ideas she has absorbed.

Chelo
Overwhelmed, self-doubting sheriff of Palomar.

Guadalupe
Guadalupe is Luba's second daughter. It is rumored in the village that her father is Manuel, whom Luba seduced in "Heartbreak Soup" when she was new to Palomar. At the same time she seduced Heraclio, who was also new to the village, but she keeps secret that he is Guadalupe's real father until she abruptly introduces them in Human Diastrophism. Heraclio's wife Carmen accepts her, telling her, "Guadalupe, whatever you two decide, you are always welcome in this house, to visit or even to live, if you want ..."
Guadalupe is fascinated with the character Jean Valjean from Hugo's Les Misérables and declares she is "going to marry him someday".

Heraclio
Heraclio is a schoolteacher married to Carmen, with whom he has a son, Tito. He is well read, though he lacks a counterpart to discuss such interests; he unsuccessfully encourages Carmen to read literature such as García Márquez's One Hundred Years of Solitude, but she struggles with poor literacy. Luba seduced him when both were new to Palomar; he fears his wife will learn of the affair, though Luba keeps it a secret from him that he is the real father of her second daughter Guadalupe.

Humberto
Humberto is an aspiring artist, and a new character to the series, Humberto shies from social interaction. Heraclio educates him in the history of modern art; meanwhile, a sometime-companion Augustín taunts Humberto's lack of skill. Humberto's devotion to improving his art overwhelms him: when he witnesses the attempted murder of a young girl, he records it in his art rather than reporting it. Traumatized, his art becomes more distorted: he obsessively sketches the villagers, and gives the murderer a halo. William A. Nericcio sees Humberto's narrative as a quasi-autobiographic artist's coming-of-age story, "Goethe's Wilhelm Meister re-imagined pen in hand south of the border".

Khamo
Khamo is Luba's former lover and unknowing father of two of her children. When he arrives in Palomar to participate in an archaeological dig, he and Luba resume their affair; when it begins to fail, it shakes Luba's self-confidence, driving her to engage in casual sex with numerous partners.

Luba
Luba is a long-established character in the Palomar stories. At the opening of Human Diastrophism Luba runs a bathhouse and is an unmarried mother of four: Maricela; Guadalupe, whose father Heraclio she seduced when he was a teenager; and Casimira and Doralis, whose father is Khamo. She is a reluctant mother; the narrator says she "has stated that if she could change anything in her past, she sure would have thought twice about having any of the five to whom she often refers as her 'little albatrosses'".

Maricela
Maricela is Luba's eldest daughter. She and her lover Riri plan to leave the village together, to escape both Luba's physical abuse and the village's disapproval of their lesbian relationship. When Riri compares the way she tosses her hair to Luba's, the enraged Maricela replies, "I am nothing like her!"

Tomaso
A former resident of Palomar, Tomaso returns with a group on an archaeological dig and sets out in secret to serial killing. A past victim calls out his name throughout the narrative.

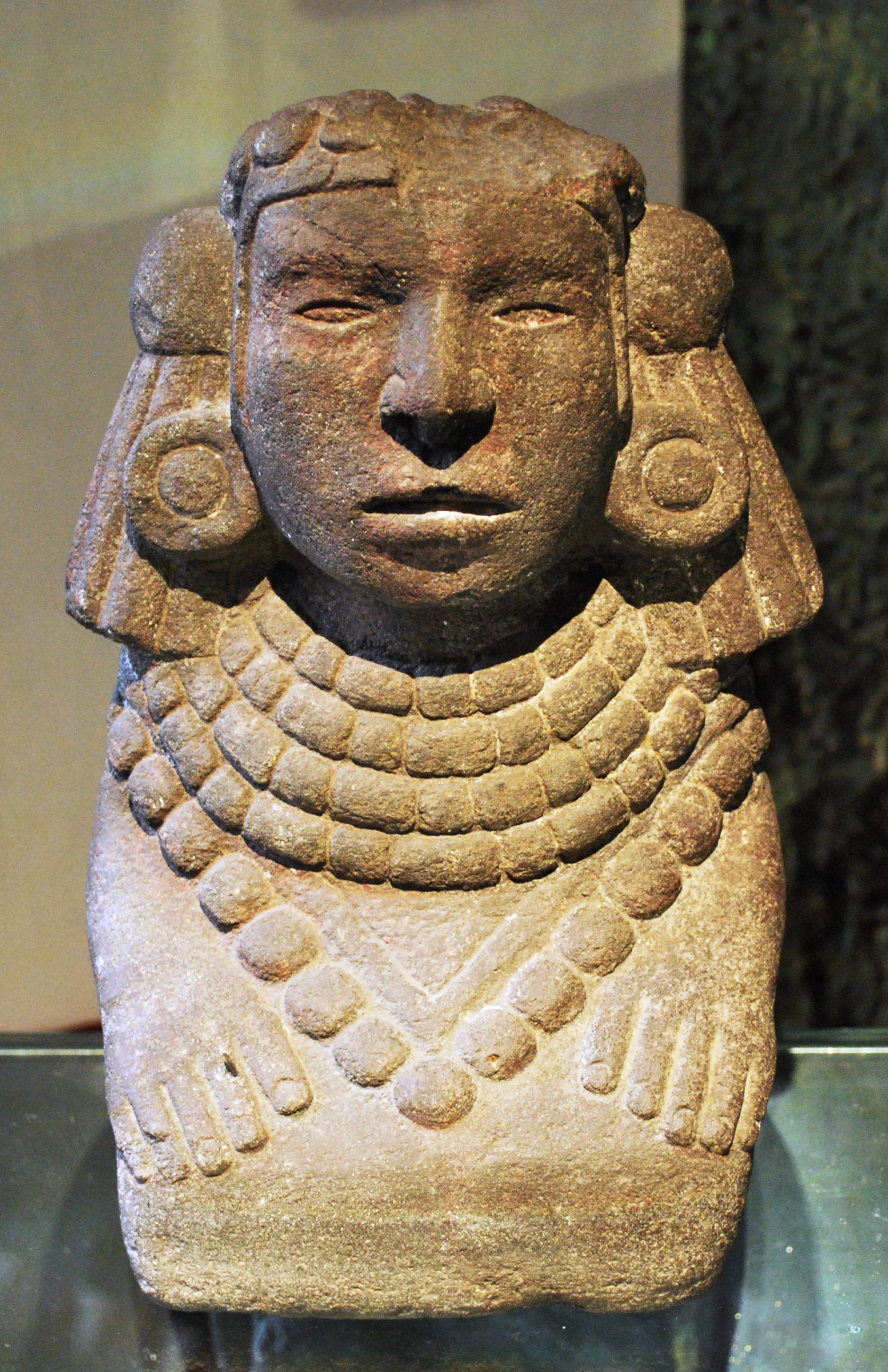
Tonantzin is named after the Aztec Earth-goddess.

Tonantzin Villaseñor
Named after an Aztec goddess, Tonantzin (whose name means "revered mother") works as a vendor of edible babosa slugs, a popular food in Palomar. The locals gossip about her uneducated naïveté and sexual promiscuity, which has led to several abortions. She corresponds with an imprisoned convict Geraldo who had assaulted her in Duck Feet (1986), and whose apocalyptic ideas politicize her—she sees Palomar in light of an international struggle. She takes to wearing the traditional garb of her people, to the consternation of her family and friends.

== Background ==
From 1981 until 1996, the Hernandez brothers—Mario (b. 1953), Gilbert (b. 1957), and Jaime (b. 1959)–showcased their work in their anthology comic book Love and Rockets. Gilbert's Palomar stories and Jaime's Locas stories accounted for the bulk of the content. Love and Rockets soon gained recognition as one of the leading publications in alternative comics. The stories rely on the complex social interactions of their large casts of characters, which drew attention for the large numbers of ethnic minorities—Latinos in particular—and complex and prominent female characters, in a field known traditionally for less sympathetic—and often misogynistic—portrayals of women.

Gilbert's Luba appeared in the first issue; a reworked version of the character as she came to be known first appeared in his Palomar stories as a strong-willed, hammer-wielding bañadora ("bathhouse girl"). Over the course of the stories she made her way to the center of political and social happenings in the fictional Latin American village of Palomar. Hernández introduces her and the teenaged Heraclio as newcomers to the fictional Latin American village of Palomar in "Sopa de Gran Pena" (Spanish for "Heartbreak Soup") in Love and Rockets #3–4 in 1983. Hernández gradually took advantage of serialization to broaden his narrative scope; the stories became longer and more ambitious, and Hernández delved more deeply into the backgrounds of his large cast of characters as their stories develop over a narrative timeframe of decades. Hernández embarked on his longest and most complex work to date when he began Human Diastrophism in 1987.

== Style and analysis ==
The word diastrophism refers to the deformation of the earth, such as by earthquakes; Hernández defines it as "the action of forces that deform the Earth's crust and so produce continents, mountains, etc". "Human diastrophism" thus refers metaphorically to the great changes that take place in the lives of those in Palomar through the events in the story. The insular village society feels threatened by the encroachment of the outside world; its mayor resists having even a telephone installed: "It would mean the end of our innocence", he replies to Chelo's pleas.

Hernández deploys a highly stylized cartooning style that nonetheless captures nuances of expression and the individuality of his characters' features. He renders characters at times naturalistic and at others highly distorted and caricatured, particularly when expressing strong feelings.

Jesse Molesworth sees parallels between Luba and Tomaso: Tomaso murders five in a span of time during which Luba has sex with five men, and both spend time in Humberto's home gazing at his artwork.

Works of literature appear frequently throughout the story. Guadalupe idolizes the protagonist of Hugo's Les Misérables, Jean Valjean. Heraclio encourages Carmen to read García Márquez's One Hundred Years of Solitude and is excited to find another teacher, Gloria, who shares his reading interests, though he does not known Raskolnikov from Dostoyevsky's Crime and Punishment when she refers to the character. Moleworth sees parallels with these characters and characters in Human Diastrophism: between Raskolnikov and Heraclio, who fears the discovery his teenage affair with Luba; and Luba with Jean Valjean, both of whom rise from disreputable backgrounds and harassment from the law to become mayor of their communities, and for whom the romantic lives of their children become a focus in their stories.

== Aftermath ==
Hernández followed Human Diastrophism with Poison River, a longer, more complex and again politically-tinged graphic novel, after which he scaled back his Palomar stories and largely back away from politics. Years later, he stated: "I had two political stories in me, [Human Diastrophism] and [Poison River], and that's it. Unless I came upon something political that I would've liked expressed, I preferred to keep away, as not to repeat myself or half-ass any truth about other people's misery".

The character Humberto nearly disappears from the Palomar continuity following his début appearance in Human Diastrophism. He reappears only in Chelo's Burden, the last Palomar story in the first Love and Rockets series, where it is revealed that he is behind the submerged statues of the denizens of Palomar that have been discovered. He declares: "One day this stream will be gone and the statues will be exposed. Reaching ever upward toward God—the sun—like eternal flowers and I will be forgiven my sins ..."

== Reception and legacy ==
Shortly after Tonantzin's suicide, a reader's letter printed in Love and Rockets #31 in December 1989 asks Hernández: "Do you think you could develop a character whose life wasn't pure misfortune? Someone who didn't have a miserable, depressing life? Someone I could care for, but not pity?" Hernández retorts: "None of my characters has had a 'miserable, depressing life'. None. And I don't do requests".

Henrandez recognized how difficult it was for new readers of Love and Rockets to get up to speed with the increasingly longer and complex stories; in issue #26 (June 1988)—in which the last instalment of Human Diastrophism appeared—in lieu of a "story so far", he declared: "For any new reader of this story; forget it, it's hopeless". The problem only worsened with the following serial, Poison River, which was longer and more complex. The weak reader reception to these two serials contributed to Hernández' decision to bring Love and Rockets to an end in 1996, after which he produced various series and standalone graphic novels.

Critic Charles Hatfield called Human Diastrophism "one of the signal examples of alternative comics from the 1980s", and reviewer Tom Knapp called it "a landmark volume that belongs in the collection of any collector of graphic novels or, for that matter, any form of quality storytelling".
