= Wigwam Bam =

- Creator: Jaime Hernández
- Date: 1994
- Series: Locas
- Publisher: Fantagraphics

Original publication
- Published in: Love and Rockets (Fantagraphics)
- Issues: 33–39, 42
- Date of publication: June 1990 – August 1993

Chronology
- Preceded by: Flies on the Ceiling (1991)
- Followed by: Chester Square (1996)

Wigwam Bam is a graphic novel by Jaime Hernández, serialized in Love and Rockets in 1990–93 and collected in 1994.

== Background and publication ==
Love and Rockets is an alternative comic book that showcased the work of the Hernández brothers—Mario (b. 1953), Gilbert (b. 1957), and Jaime (b. 1959). Most of Jaime's work focused on a group of young women—primarily two named Maggie and Hopey—that have come to be called the Locas stories. The early ones take place in a science fiction world that Jaime was to abandon for character-centered stories in a realistic world, drawn in a slick, streamlined style combining realistic anatomy with traditional cartooning techniques.

== Publication ==
The serialization of Wigwam Bam appeared from June 1990 to August 1993 in Love and Rockets #33–39 and 42. It first appeared in collected form in The Complete Love and Rockets, Volume 11 in 1994.

== Style and analysis ==
At 120 pages, Wigwam Bam is the longest of the Locas stories. The narrative unfolds among a series of unannounced flashbacks.
