= Luba (comics) =

Comic book character created by Gilbert Hernandez

Luba is a comic book character created by Gilbert Hernandez, featured mainly in the Love and Rockets series by these authors. She first appeared in "BEM", found in the Love and Rockets collection Music for Mechanics.

Created by Gilbert Hernandez, Luba was the protagonist for his main contribution to the Hernandez brothers' groundbreaking comic book Love and Rockets. Based largely in a small Central American village named Palomar, the Luba stories follow the progress of Luba and her ever increasing family through the years. Luba was ranked 60th in Comics Buyer's Guide's "100 Sexiest Women in Comics" list.

From the outset Luba is portrayed as a beautiful, fiery-tempered woman with enormous breasts and an eye for younger men, often depicted in random panels inexplicably carrying a hammer. This, in conjunction with Jaime Hernandez' "Maggie and Hopey" tales, differentiated Love And Rockets from other comics in that the principal characters were all strong women who, whilst being independent, were also fallible. Through some twenty odd years Gilbert has taken the character of Luba through her infancy as the illegitimate child of a woman married into organized crime, through to life as a middle-aged migrant to America.

Some of the Luba tales take place in Palomar where Gilbert developed a rich cast of residents, who over the years developed an intricate series of relations with each other. The bulk of the tales dealt with what happened after Luba and her family moved from Palomar to California to escape the mafia and be near her half sisters Fritz and Petra. These stories comprise the books that make up the Luba Trilogy: Luba in America, The Book Of Ofelia, and The Three Daughters.
