= Citizen Rex =

- Date: 2011
- Page count: 144 pages
- Publisher: Dark Horse Comics

Creative team
- Writer: Mario Hernández
- Artist: Gilbert Hernández

Citizen Rex is a graphic novel by American cartoonist brothers Gilbert (art) Mario Hernández (writing), published by Dark Horse Comics in 2011. It tells of the robot CTZ-RX-1 (a.k.a. "Citizen Rex") and his quest to avenge himself. The story mixes science fiction, drama, mystery, and comedy. Citizen Rex was first serialized as a six-issue limited series from Dark Horse that débuted in 2009.
