= Garden of the Flesh =

Graphic novel by Gilbert Hernández

- The cover for Garden of the Flesh
- Date: 27 September 2016
- Page count: 100 pages
- Publisher: Fantagraphics
- Writer: Gilbert Hernández
- Artist: Gilbert Hernández

Garden of the Flesh is a graphic novel written and drawn by Gilbert Hernández in 2016, and published by Fantagraphics Books.

The novel consists of sexually explicit retellings of various Biblical stories from the Genesis creation narrative - centring on Adam and Eve, Cain and Abel and Noah's Ark.

== Creation and publication ==
Hernández would state that part of his motivation for creating the book was in response to Robert Crumb's similarly-themed The Book of Genesis, explaining "I was looking at Crumb's version and nobody seems happy in it unless they're fucking someone over. I just wanted to do a happy version with good-looking people enjoying each other." When Mike Lorah of Comic Book Resources charged the artist with deliberately producing an extremely provocative story, Hernández responded "Sure, but I'm only depicting vanilla sex, which is only for starting a family. No titillating violence or corn-holing or sex with animals."

The first edition of the book was notebook-sized, featured a faux leather embossed cover, and was originally shrink-wrapped - a format The Cornell Daily Sun noted as an "ingenious design" for the subject matter. The design was credited to "J. Feeli Pecker" - a pseudonym for Keeli McCarthy.

== Synopsis ==
Adam is born out of the ground but soon becomes lonely in the Garden of Eden. He masturbates and falls asleep, and a bolt from Heaven turns his semen into Eve. The pair live an idyllic life in the garden until Eve is tempted to eat an apple from the forbidden tree after having intercourse with Satan. God casts them out, and they become ashamed of their nudity. The pair begin a pastoral life, and Eve bears two sons called Cain and Abel.

Cain becomes jealous when the divine light shines on Abel and murders his brother with a rock. He is struck by lightning and forced to carry the Mark of Cain. He wanders the land until he meets a bathing lady; the pair have sexual intercourse and a new generation begins.

Later Noah is favoured by the divine light, and takes a wife. They have three sons, who take wives of their own. He receives a vision from God and builds the Ark, taking his family and two of each animal onboard before divine retribution brings floods to the world. After forty days and forty nights the storms end, leaving humanity with another chance and a new beginning.

=== Connections to other works ===
The female featured at the end of the story is 'adult entertainment superstar' Pupusi, a minor character from Hernández' Love and Rockets stories who later appeared in his anthology series Blubber. Hernández would also make a tongue-in-cheek suggestion that Noah's voluptuous wife was Fritz from the same series in disguise "because it was decided that porn might ruin her fading career even faster".

== Reception ==
Critical reception of the graphic novel has been mixed.

Nathan Chazan of The Cornell Daily Sun identified Garden of the Flesh as another sign of the growing fascination with obscenity in Hernández' work, praising it and noting that "by slamming together the biblical and the pornographic, Hernandez explores the power fantasies which fuel both." Writing for Vice, Nick Gazin was also positive, stating "Gilbert Hernandez is one of the modern greats, so I would advise that you definitely read this unless you're averse to comics that are drenched in jizz.". On his personal blog, The Comics Journal reviewer Rob Clough was also effusive about Hernández' blending of biblical and pornographic tropes, observing "Hernandez also seamlessly overlays the structure of pornographic films onto the episodic structure of the Bible. That is, new characters in new situations were constantly being introduced in the Bible in the same way that new actors appear in porn to offer variety to the viewer."

Robert Boyd was less impressed in The Comics Journal itself, expressing disappointment in the work's lack of variation, describing it as "boring fucking and fucking boring." Ian Keogh of Slings & Arrows was also unimpressed. Grading the book 2 out of 5; he bemoaned that the sex "might work as erotica for a boy in his early teenage years who's led a sheltered life, but for anyone else it's uniformly dull and devoid of ideas.".
