= God and Science: Return of the Ti-Girls =

- Creator: Jaime Hernández
- Date: 2012
- Series: Locas
- Publisher: Fantagraphics

Original publication
- Published in: Love and Rockets
- Issues: Love and Rockets: New Stories 1–2
- Date of publication: 2008–2009

Chronology
- Preceded by: The Education of Hopey Glass (2008)
- Followed by: The Love Bunglers (2014)

God and Science: Return of the Ti-Girls is a graphic novel by American cartoonist Jaime Hernández, published in 2012 after serialization in Love and Rockets: New Stories #1–2 in 2008–2009.

== Content ==
The narrative of God and Science centers around Maggie Chascarrillo, the Mexican-American protagonist of Jaime Hernandez's long-running comic Locas in his (and brother Gilbert's) Love and Rockets comics. Though Maggie is only a supporting player in this book, Hernández situates her as "a pivotal figure at the border between the mundane world of the apartment complex she manages and the fantastic realm occupied by female superheroes and supervillains".

The story is the longest superhero tale Hernández has produced; it features characters from comic books that the character Maggie Chascarillo had collected in Hernández's previous stories, but which had not until this story appeared on their own.

== Publication ==
The story first appeared in the comic book Love and Rockets: New Stories #1–2 in 2008–2009, published by Fantagraphics Books. A stand-alone book edition appeared from the same publisher in 2012, to which Hernández added thirty pages and a new ending.
