= The Love Bunglers =

2014 graphic novel by Jaime Hernandez

- Creator: Jaime Hernández
- Date: 2014
- Series: Locas
- Page count: 112 pages
- Publisher: Fantagraphics

Original publication
- Published in: Love and Rockets
- Issues: Love and Rockets: New Stories #3 and #4
- Dates of publication: 2011-2012

Chronology
- Preceded by: God and Science: Return of the Ti-Girls (2012)
- Followed by: Is This How You See Me? (2019)

The Love Bunglers is a graphic novel by American cartoonist Jaime Hernández, published in 2014. The story focuses on the character Maggie Chascarrillo, the now middle-aged protagonist of Hernandez's long-running Locas stories, and two men with whom she has been involved with in the past, Ray Dominguez and Reno Banks. The book collects a story originally published in Love and Rockets: New Stories issues #3 and #4 in 2011 and 2012.

It won the 2015 Los Angeles Times Book Prize for Graphic Novel/Comics.

- Sava, Oliver (2014-04-25). "The Love Bunglers preaches the gospel of Maggie Chascarillo". The A.V. Club.
