= The Children of Palomar =

American comics compilation

- Creator: Gilbert Hernández
- Date: 2013
- Series: Palomar
- Publisher: Fantagraphics

Original publication
- Published in: New Tales of Old Palomar (Ignatz series)
- Issues: 1–3
- Date of publication: 2006–2007

Chronology
- Preceded by: High Soft Lisp (2010)
- Followed by: Lovers and Haters (2025)

The Children of Palomar is a comics compilation by American cartoonist Gilbert Hernández, published in 2013. It collects five stories originally published in 2006 and 2007 in the three-issue series New Tales of Old Palomar.

The stories and vignettes of The Children of Palomar take place in Hernández's fictional Latin American village of Palomar, the setting of many of his early stories. They feature many of the characters from these older stories, such as Tonantzín, Diana, Chelo, and Pipo, at different times in their lives. The narratives focus primarily on the female characters, and include elements of magic realism.

In an interview in 2007, Hernández stated he would cease creating stories set in Palomar; he said he had "finally outgrown the place".
