= Fatima: The Blood Spinners =

2012 comic series by Gilbert Hernandez

- The cover of the collected edition.

Publication information
- Publisher: Dark Horse Comics
- Schedule: Monthly
- Format: Limited series
- Publication date: June – September 2012
- No. of issues: 4

Creative team
- Created by: Gilbert Hernandez
- Editor: Diana Schutz

Fatima: The Blood Spinners is a four-issue science fiction/horror comic book mini-series created, written, illustrated and lettered by Gilbert Hernandez. It was published by Dark Horse Comics through their Dark Horse Originals imprint from June to September 2012. The series concerns the attempt of heroine Fatima to combat a drug called Spin that threatens to turn the human race into zombies. The series has received largely positive reviews.

== Creation ==
Speaking before an audience at Stanford University in 2014, Hernandez stated he had aimed to capture a more lurid style for the work, having grown tired of the "respectability" of the graphic novel format. The series marked one of the relatively few occasions Hernandez has worked for a mainstream comics company.

== Synopsis ==
An expert shot, Fatima works for an agency known only as Operations. Testing at Operations rediscovers a drug named Spin, based on a mixture previously developed by Kololodo Indians 300 years before. The new version produces a dizzying high that boosts both the physical and mental aptitude of the taker. However it also has a severe comedown, effectively turning the subject into a zombie. Despite the strict protocols at Operations a leak gets Spin to the general population and the addiction spreads, with no known cure. Operations teams attempt to combat distributors and battle the zombies, but despite killing huge numbers of both the highly viral spread of Spin, the loss of several of their best agents, slow research into a cure and a series of misfortunes soon see them whittled down to a handful of surviving members, including Fatima and her crush Jody. Unable to combat the pandemic, they retreat to what is left of Operations and cryogenically freeze themselves for a hundred years, hoping to rebuild once the infection has run its course.

However a technical malfunction sees Fatima, Jody and fellow agents Chitts, Moira and Alexis reawaken after just seven years. They find the zombies have gone but the surviving pockets of mankind have degenerated severely. A group of surviving scientists contact Operations, hoping to use their healthy genetic material to return mankind to its former condition. Fatima, Moira and Alexis take an Operations flying stealth craft to visit them, and are shocked by the devastation the Spin plague has caused to the cities of Earth. However, on arrival they find the survivors are more horribly mutated and less sympathetic than originally appeared. Moira and Alexis are captured, and while Fatima is able to rescue them it is not before Moira is impregnated by one of the mutants, becoming grotesquely bloated before rapidly giving birth. Fatima and Alexis rapidly realise Chitts has set them up and return to Operations after mercy-killing Moira. Chitts attempts to destroy them on their return and is revealed as the source of the leaking of Spin, planning to make a fortune selling the anti-Spin serum. However, when escaping he is trapped and infected by Moira's child. He explodes giving birth, and his trio of winged children carry off an unworried Alexis. Moira's child, winged and rapidly learning, carries Fatima and Jody to the city of devolved humans. There Jody begins research and Fatima quickly tires of her now-dull planet. Unable to trust anyone after the trauma she has suffered she sets off into the wastes by herself.

== Reception ==
Writing for The Comics Journal, Sean T. Collins praised the over-the-top nature and clean composition of the first issue, noting that "If you like comics about people getting shot in the head, it's literally impossible to find a better one".

Reviewing the collected edition for Broken Frontier, Tom Murphy praised the book's genre-shifting narrative, describing it as an "energetic and joyously uninhibited work". Writing for Paste, Hillary Brown felt the series was a "successful experiment".

== Collected editions ==
The series has been collected into a single volume:

Title	ISBN	Release date	Issues
Fatima: The Blood Spinners	9781621159872	1 April 2014	Fatima: The Blood Spinners #1-4
