= Marble Season =

- First edition cover
- Creator: Gilbert Hernández
- Date: 2013
- Publisher: Drawn & Quarterly

Marble Season is a graphic novel by American cartoonist Gilbert Hernández, published by Drawn & Quarterly in 2013.

The story is set in the 1960s and focuses on Huey, the middle of three Mexican-American brothers. It deals with typical childhood concerns, such as the games they play, the groups they belong to, and obsessions with pop culture. As in the Peanuts comic strip, adults are always outside the panels. Much as in Hernández's Palomar stories, the narrative wanders in and out of various threads and frequently shifts focus between scenes and characters. The artwork is simple, and the story unfolds in a grid of six panels to the page.

In contrast to the sexually explicit, violent work on which his reputation rests, Hernández wanted to create a book that was appropriate for young readers, and drew much of the narrative from his own childhood memories.
