= Palomar (comics) =

Graphic novel by Gilbert Hernandez

Palomar: The Heartbreak Soup Stories
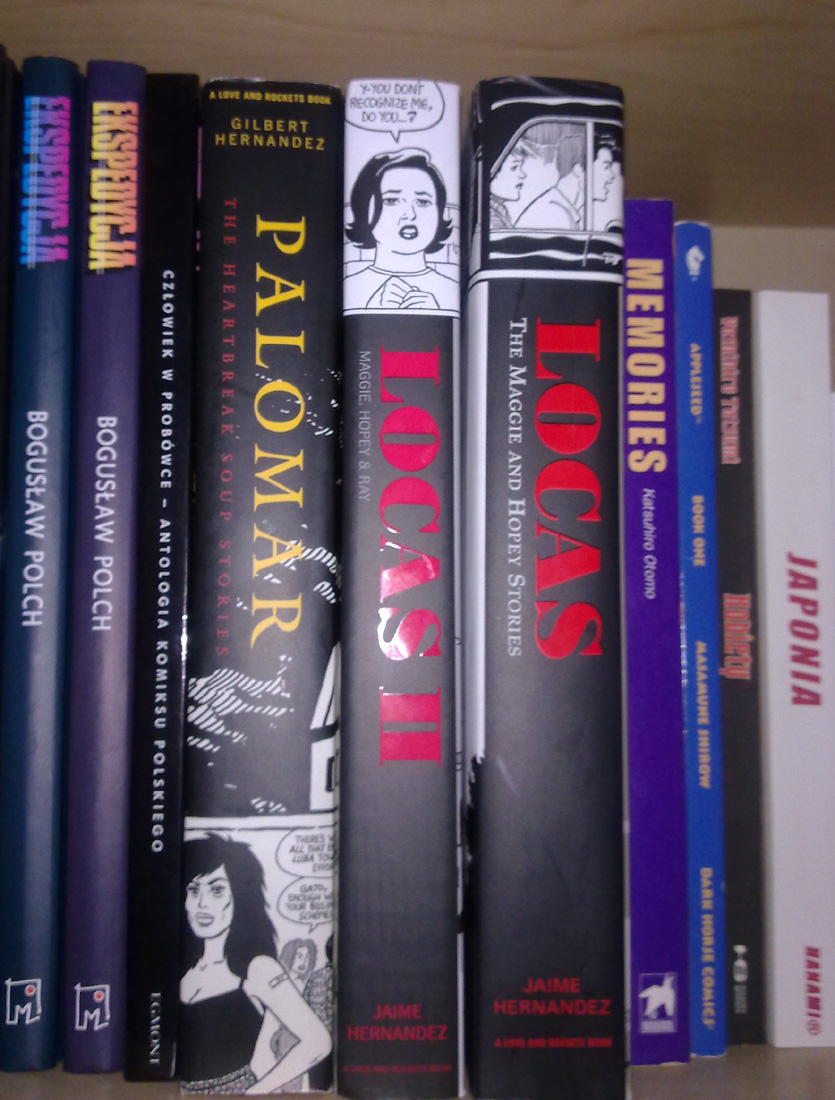
- Date: 2003
- Publisher: Fantagraphics Books

Creative team
- Writers: Gilbert Hernandez
- Artists: Gilbert Hernandez

Original publication
- Published in: Love and Rockets
- ISBN: 1560975393

Palomar (subtitled The Heartbreak Soup Stories) is the title of a graphic novel written and drawn by Gilbert Hernandez and published in 2003 by Fantagraphics Books (ISBN 1-56097-539-3). It collects work previously published within the pages of Love and Rockets (volume one). Palomar is the fictional town in Latin America where all the stories presented are set. Palomar was included in Time magazine's Best Comics of 2003 list.

== Plot ==
Set in the titular fictional town in an unnamed Central American nation, Palomar follows Luba, a businesswoman who works at the town's movie theater in order to care for her seven illegitimate children. The comic has drawn praise for its portrayal of female characters and Latin American culture within the often-misogynistic comics industry. The comic notably defies stereotypes about Latin Americans, with the titular town and its residents rarely conforming to stereotypical perceptions and not being treated as "foreign."
