= Bumperhead =

American graphic novel

- Creator: Gilbert Hernández
- Date: 2014
- Page count: 120 pages
- Publisher: Drawn & Quarterly

Bumperhead is a graphic novel by American cartoonist Gilbert Hernández, published by Drawn & Quarterly in 2014.

The 120-page, five-chapter graphic novel follows its aimless protagonist from elementary school to middle age. Bobby Numbly grows up in Oxnard, California—Hernández's own hometown. His nickname "Bumperhead" is slang for someone who copies all that he sees others doing. The first chapter looks at his early childhood; the second his teenage years, when he gets into drugs and sex and listens to glam and prog rock; the third his aimless early adulthood; the fourth his punk-rock early 20s; and the last his middle-aged adulthood.
