= Julio's Day =

2013 graphic novel by Gilbert Hernández

- Date: 2013
- Publisher: Fantagraphics

Original publication
- Published in: Love and Rockets Vol. 2 (Fantagraphics)
- Issues: 1–14, 17–20
- Date of publication: Spring 2001 – Summer 2007

Julio's Day is a graphic novel by Gilbert Hernández, serialized in Love and Rockets Volume 2 in 2001–2007 and collected in 2013. It tells the story of a man whose life spans the years 1900 to 2000.

== Synopsis ==
The story traces the life of the title character Julio from his birth in 1900 to his death in 2000. It takes place in a rural village in the American South.

== Publication ==
The story's serialization appeared from 2001 to 2007 in Love and Rockets Volume 2 #1–14 and #17–20. Hernández expanded the page count significantly for its collection in 2013, which included an introduction by Brian Evenson and a blurb from Junot Díaz.
