= Sloth (comics) =

- Creator: Gilbert Hernández
- Date: 2014
- Page count: 128 pages
- Publisher: Vertigo (DC Comics)

Sloth is a graphic novel by American cartoonist Gilbert Hernández, published by Vertigo in 2006. The story opens with the teenaged Miguel Serra awakening from a year-long coma. The surreal tale unravels as its protagonists delve into the legends of the sleepy suburban town they live in. The book is unrelated to Hernández's Palomar stories and is the first of Henandez's graphic novel not compiled from smaller parts.
