= The Troublemakers (graphic novel) =

Graphic novel by Gilbert Hernández from 2009

- Creator: Gilbert Hernández
- Date: 2009
- Series: Fritz B-Movies
- Page count: 128 pages
- Publisher: Fantagraphics

Chronology
- Preceded by: Chance In Hell (2007)
- Followed by: Love from the Shadows (2011)

The Troublemakers is a graphic novel by American cartoonist Gilbert Hernández, published in 2009. It is one of a number of stand-alone graphic novels featuring Hernández's character Fritz acting in stories inspired by pulp fiction and exploitation movies. Fritz plays a magician's assistant named Nala.

== Background ==
The lead character in The Troublemakers is Rosalba "Fritz" Martinez, the half-sister of Hernández's character Luba. Fritz similarly starred in Speak of the Devil (2008), which is presented as the true story behind a movie. Hernández drew inspiration from pulp fiction and heist films such as It's a Mad, Mad, Mad, Mad World (1960) and A Simple Plan (1998).

== Synopsis ==
The musician and con-man Wes tries to steal $200000 from his friend Dewy Booth to start a rock-and-roll club. He gets his former babysitter, the stage magician Nala, to help him. Vincene, a woman from Wes's past who is also a criminal, gets involved; soon Wes comes to question the motives of those around him.
