= Love and Rockets (comics) =

Comic book series by the Hernández brothers

- Cover illustration by Gilbert Hernández for Love and Rockets #16, depicting two of his major Palomar characters, Heraclio and Carmen.

Publication information
- Publisher: Fantagraphics
- Schedule: irregular
- Format: Ongoing series
- Publication date: Vol. 1: September 1982 – April 1996; Vol. 2: 2001–2007; Vol. 3: 2008–2016; Vol. 4: 2016–present
- No. of issues: Vol. 1: 50; Vol. 2: 20; Vol. 3: 8; Vol. 4: 17

Creative team
- Created by: Gilbert Hernández; Jaime Hernández; Mario Hernández

Love and Rockets (often abbreviated L&R) is a long-running comic book series by the Hernández brothers: Gilbert, Jaime, and Mario. The series is published by Fantagraphics. It was one of the first comic books in the alternative comics movement of the 1980s.

The Hernández brothers produce stories in the series independently of each other. Gilbert and Jaime produce the majority of the material, and tend to focus on particular casts of characters and settings. Those of Gilbert usually focus on a cast of characters in the fictional Central American village of Palomar; the stories often feature magic realist elements. The Locas stories of Jaime center on a social group in Los Angeles, particularly the Latina friends and sometime-lovers Maggie and Hopey.

== Overview ==
Raised in the city of Oxnard, California, the Hernández brothers had been reading comics since childhood. In the late 1960s, the brothers got into the underground comix movement through discovering a copy of Robert Crumb's Zap Comix.

In early adulthood, while working as janitors, Gilbert and Jaime were regularly drawing comics for their and their friends' enjoyment. Mario had a friend who operated a local college’s printing press, so he suggested to his brothers that they should all make their own comic, with Gilbert and Jaime drawing the stories, and Mario drawing the cover.

The Hernández brothers self-published the first issue of Love and Rockets in 1981. The brothers sent a copy of their self-published comic to The Comics Journal, a magazine published by Fantagraphics, for a review. Gary Groth was so impressed with it that the company offered them a publishing deal. It was one of the first comic books in the alternative comics movement of the 1980s.

The magazine temporarily ceased publication in 1996 after the release of issue #50. However, after several publications featuring characters from the series, in 2001 the brothers revived the series as Love and Rockets Volume 2, and have continued it since.

Love and Rockets contains several ongoing serial narratives, the most prominent being Gilbert's Palomar stories and Jaime's Locas stories.

Palomar tells the story of a fictional village in Latin America and its inhabitants. Its vibrant characters and sometimes-fantastic events are sometimes compared to the magical realism literary style of authors such as Gabriel García Márquez and Jorge Luis Borges. The stories often revolve around the taciturn Luba, and also feature the dreamy Heraclio, the gullible Tonantzín, and the town sheriff Chelo.

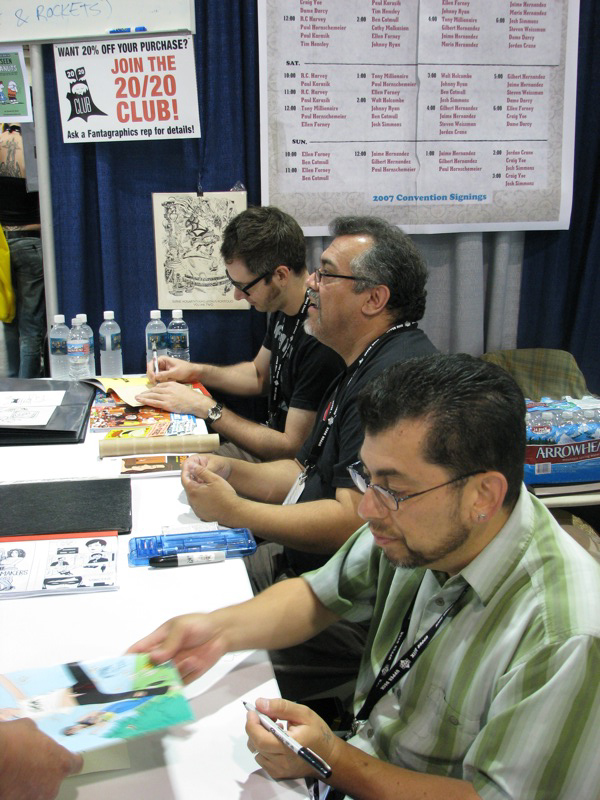
Gilbert and Jaime Hernández at the 2007 ComicCon. Gilbert is in the middle, Jaime is in the green shirt.

Locas follows Maggie Chascarrillo, a chicano woman living in Southern California, and an extended cast of her friends, family, lovers, and rivals. Originally a young "prosolar mechanic", the early stories contain rocket ships and dinosaurs, before starting to include fewer adventure tales and more slice-of-life. Other characters include her punk rocker maybe-girlfriend Hopey Glass, depressed writer Isabelle Reubens, blonde bombshell Penny Century, charming artist and Maggie's on-off boyfriend Ray Dominguez, and gang member Speedy Ortíz. Since her first appearance in the early 1980s, Maggie has aged alongside her author, going from a teen in the local punk scene through to middle age via a series of relationships and jobs. It is mostly set around the fictional city of Huerta, in a neighbourhood the characters call Hoppers. Huerta is inspired by the Hernándezes' home town of Oxnard.

The original runs of Palomar and Locas have each been collected in the early 2000s as one-volume editions by Fantagraphics, although not all of the stories involving "Locas" and "Palomar" characters are contained in these collections. The original fifty-issue Love and Rockets Volume One has also been reprinted in its entirety in both a fifteen-volume paperback graphic novel series, and in 2022 as a seven-volume mass-market paperback series, both by Fantagraphics.

== Content ==
=== Characters ===
==== Jaime's Locas ====
- Margarita Luisa "Maggie" Chascarrillo: called "Perla" by her family; best friend (and occasional girlfriend) of Hopey; otherwise dates men, most prominently Ray Dominguez. She befriended Hopey in the punk rock scene of their southern Californian hometown and briefly becomes a world-travelling mechanic who goes on science-fiction flavored adventures in the early issues.
- Esperanza Leticia "Hopey" Glass: sharp-tongued, wild and adventurous best friend of Maggie. A lesbian who plays bass in a series of punk bands, often touring and furthering her adventures/story.
- Beatríz "Penny Century" García: bombshell friend to Maggie/Hopey and wife of the ridiculously wealthy H.R. Costigan. She aspires to become a superhero.
- Isabel Maria "Izzy" Ortíz Reubens: Friend/mentor to Maggie and a sister of Speedy. Izzy is a writer who suffers a nervous breakdown after a divorce/abortion, becoming a notorious "witch lady" in Hoppers.
- Daphne "Daffy" Matsumoto: a rich, naive young friend of Maggie and Hopey who is a prominent supporting character in the early comics, but later goes off to college.
- Ray Dominguez: one of Maggie's boyfriends, a painter. Jaime follows his life from Hoppers to LA.
- Doyle Blackburn: Ray's childhood friend, whose level head cools many situations, who struggles with a history of violence.
- Rena "La Toña" Titañon and Vicki Glori: championship rivals in the world of women's Mexican wrestling. Rena is Maggie's friend and (through her many adventures) a loved (and hated) Latin American revolutionary icon. Vicki, later a wrestling coach and league official, is Maggie's aunt and her guardian during her Huerta years.
- Danita Lincoln: Maggie's coworker at Vandy's. She dates Ray after Maggie leaves town, also works as a stripper with Doyle's girlfriend Lily.
- H.R. Costigan: horned billionaire who has an open marriage with Penny Century.
- Theresa "Terry" Downe: talented, cold, pretty guitar player who still pines for ex-girlfriend Hopey.
- Rand Race: handsome, world-famous mechanic who hires Maggie and takes her on adventures, oblivious to her crush on him because of his infatuation with former girlfriend Penny Century.
- Eulalio "Speedy" Ortíz: Isabel's brother, a member of the local "Hoppers" gang, shared a mutual crush on Maggie until his untimely death. The character is the inspiration for the rock group Speedy Ortiz.
- Esther Chascarillo: Maggie's younger sister. Maggie calls her "Esther Babies" or "Babies". She has a brief relationship with Speedy.

==== Gilbert's Palomar ====
- Luba: no-nonsense, hammer-wielding, promiscuous, enormously busty bañadora (bath giver) who rises to mayor of Palomar and has a complex history before coming to town.
- Luba's children: Maricela, Guadalupe, Doralis, Casimira, Socorro, Joselito, Concepción.
- Luba's lovers: Archie, Khamo, Peter, Jose.
- Ofelia: Luba's cousin who helped raise her and her children.
- Heraclio and Carmen: a loving couple who served as central characters for many early Palomar stories.
- Israel, Satch, Vicente, Jesús: Heraclio and Pipo's childhood gang of friends.
- Chelo: sheriff of Palomar, midwife who delivered many of the main characters.
- Pipo, Gato, Sergio: beautiful, vain, successful Pipo; her angry but devoted (ex-)husband Gato, and her son (by Manuel) Sergio, a world-famous soccer star.
- Tonantzín Villaseñor: beautiful, hard-partying girl who sells fried babosos (slugs) and later becomes passionately politically active.
- Manuel and Soledad: friends/lovers/rivals, stars of the first Palomar story "Heartbreak Soup"
- Fritz, Petra, Venus: Fritz and Petra are Luba's long-lost half-sisters who share her voluptuous figure and penchant for adventure. Venus is Petra's precocious, comics-loving daughter.
- María: Luba's mother, who abandoned her when she was a toddler. She emigrated to United States and became mother to Fritz and Petra.
- Errata Stigmata: a somewhat surreal character who develops stigmata as a reaction to severe emotional trauma. Her first appearance was in "Radio Zero" and her origin is told in "Tears from Heaven".

=== Landmark stories ===
This list provides an example of the types of stories that helped Love and Rockets gain critical acclaim.

==== Jaime ====
- Mechanics – the original "Maggie the mechanic" story, and one of Jaime’s earliest longer stories, in which Maggie travels to South America with a group of mechanics and becomes caught in the middle of a political revolution.
- The Death of Speedy – Jaime moves away from the "Maggie the mechanic" stories to permanently settle on adventures in Maggie's personal life. Maggie's longtime crush Speedy dies in his car either by suicide or a rival gang (it's left ambiguous). She also begins dating the understated artist Ray.
- Flies on the Ceiling – the story of Izzy Reubens' nervous breakdown in Mexico, where she moves after an abortion and a divorce.
- Wigwam Bam – Hopey and Maggie have a falling out, with the rest of the story focusing on Hopey leaving her hometown of Hoppers to find adventures, as well as on the relationships of Hopey and the Hoppers crowd. Over the course of the story we see Hopey’s deep feelings for Maggie.
- Home School – using Peanuts and Dennis the Menace inspired artwork, Jaime tells the story of toddler Maggie and slightly-older Isabel becoming friends under the shadow of fighting parents.
- The Ghost of Hoppers – grown-up Maggie, now an apartment manager and still in off-and-on relationships with Hopey, meets Vivian Solis and travels with her back to the neighbourhood of Hoppers. There she has a surreal experience watching Izzy's house burn down.
- The Love Bunglers – a middle-aged Maggie comes into her own and comes to terms with her complicated relationship with Ray.

==== Gilbert ====
- Heartbreak Soup – first Palomar story. Tells the story of notorious ladies' man Manuel, and his affair with Pipo Jiminez, and establishes the rivalry between Luba and Chelo.
- An American in Palomar – a self-important American photographer tries to frame Palomar as a downtrodden, poverty-stricken town to further his own career.
- For the Love of Carmen – a one-issue meditation on the marriage of Heraclio and Carmen Calderon, citizens of Palomar.
- Human Diastrophism – Palomar's residents hunt for a serial killer while Luba reignites with former lover Khamo, and Tonantzín is taken in by the spiritual and political views of a jailed prisoner. Published in book form under the title Blood of Palomar.
- Poison River – an immensely complex story of Luba's pre-Palomar life. It details her broken family, her young marriage to first husband Pedro, his criminal connections and her own drug habits, reuniting with her cousin Ofelia, giving birth to her first daughter, fleeing military conflicts, and her ending up on the outskirts of Palomar.
- Love and Rockets X – mostly set in Los Angeles, a young, white garage band named Love and Rockets runs into a series of conflicts surrounding race, class, sexual orientation, and generational differences. Set near the time of the 1992 Los Angeles riots.

== Publication history ==
=== Issues of Love and Rockets ===
==== Volume I ====
The brothers Gilbert, Jaime, and Mario Hernandez self-published the first issue of Love and Rockets in 1981. In 1982, Fantagraphics Books republished this issue with a color cover. The series was published at magazine size, larger than typical American comic books. Either Gilbert or Jaime, the series' main contributors, would provide the front cover for a given issue, and the other the back; they alternated these duties each issue. The first volume ended with the 50th issue in 1996.

==== Volume II ====
After the end of the first series, the two brothers began working on separate titles that carried on many of the stories in the original Love and Rockets. Sales for these were lower, so in 2001 they began to release a second series under that name. The second volume ran for twenty issues from 2001 to 2007 in standard US comic book size.

==== Volume III / New Stories ====
The third series, Love and Rockets: New Stories, which ran for eight issues, began in 2008, published annually in 100-page, graphic novel-sized issues:

1. New Stories, volume 1, 112 pages (2008)
2. New Stories, volume 2, 104 pages (2009)
3. New Stories, volume 3, 104 pages (2010)
4. New Stories, volume 4, 104 pages (2011)
5. New Stories, volume 5, 96 pages (2012)
6. New Stories, volume 6, 100 pages (2013)
7. New Stories, volume 7, 100 pages (2015)
8. New Stories, volume 8, 100 pages (2016)

==== Volume IV ====
In 2016, Fantagraphics began releasing Volume IV of Love and Rockets, returning to its original, magazine-sized format. As of January 2026, seventeen issues have been released.

=== Graphic novels and collections ===
==== The Complete Love and Rockets ====
All published at Fantagraphics:

1. Music for Mechanics by Los Bros Hernández; collecting stories from Love and Rockets vol. 1 #1-2; October 1985; 152 pages
  Preface by Carter Scholz
2. Chelo's Burden by Los Bros Hernández; collecting stories from Love and Rockets vol. 1 #3-4, Mechanics #1 and original material; June 1986; 144 pages
  Preface by Gary Groth
3. Las Mujeres Perdidas by Los Bros Hernández (only Gilbert and Jaime); collecting stories from Love and Rockets vol. 1 #5-11 and original material; August 1987; 160 pages
4. Tears from Heaven by Los Bros Hernández (Gilbert and Jaime; one cover by Mario); collecting stories from Love and Rockets vol. 1 #5-8, 10-12, Mechanics #1-2, and original material; January 1988; 136 pages
5. House of Raging Women, by Los Bros Hernández (only Gilbert and Jaime from now on); collecting stories from Love and Rockets vol. 1 #13-16 and original material; September 1988; 136 pages
6. Duck Feet by Los Bros Hernández; collecting stories from Love and Rockets vol. 1 #6, 9, 17-20, and Anything Goes! #2; September 1988; 136 pages
7. The Death of Speedy by Jaime Hernández; collecting stories from Love and Rockets vol. 1 #20-27; November 1989; 136 pages
8. Blood of Palomar by Gilbert Hernández; collecting stories from Love and Rockets vol. 1 #21-26, Anything Goes! #4, The Reticent Heart and Other Stories, and original material; December 1989; 128 pages
9. Flies on the Ceiling by Los Bros Hernández (principally Jaime); collecting stories from Love and Rockets vol. 1 #21, 27-32; October 1991; 128 pages
10. Love and Rockets X by Gilbert Hernández; collecting stories from Love and Rockets vol. 1 #31-39; July 1993; 72 pages
11. Wigwam Bam by Jaime Hernández; collecting stories from Love and Rockets vol. 1 #33-39, 42; March 1994; 136 pages
12. Poison River by Gilbert Hernández; collecting stories from Love and Rockets vol. 1 #29-40; September 1994; 192 pages
13. Chester Square by Jaime Hernández; collecting stories from Love and Rockets vol. 1 #40-50; July 1996; 160 pages
14. Luba Conquers the World by Gilbert Hernández; collecting stories from Love and Rockets vol. 1 #41-48, 50, Ten Years of Love and Rockets and original material; December 1996; 136 pages
15. Hernández Satyricon by Los Bros Hernández (Mario, Gilbert & Jaime Hernández); collecting stories from Love and Rockets vol. 1 #40-43, 45-46, 49-50, Ten Years of Love and Rockets and original material; August 1997; 160 pages
16. Whoa Nellie! by Jaime Hernández; collecting Whoa Nellie! #1-3; June 2000; 80 pages
17. Fear of Comics by Gilbert Hernández; collecting stories from New Love #1-6, Vortex #7, Hate #26, UG!3K & Expozo, Zero Zero #7, and Goody Good Comics #1; October 2000; 120 pages
18. Locas in Love by Jaime Hernández; collecting Maggie and Hopey Color Fun Special #1, and stories from Penny Century #1-4, and Measles #2; October 2000; 120 pages
19. Luba in America by Gilbert Hernández; collecting stories from New Love #1-6, Luba #1-4, Luba's Comics and Stories #1 and original material; January 2001; 168 pages
20. Dicks and Deedees by Jaime Hernández; collecting Penny Century #5-7 and stories from Love and Rockets vol. 2 #4-5; June 2003; 96 pages
21. Luba: The Book of Ofelia by Gilbert Hernández; collecting stories from Luba #3-10, Luba's Comics and Stories #2-5, and Measles #3; December 2005; 256 pages
22. Ghost of Hoppers by Jaime Hernández; collecting stories from Love and Rockets vol. 2 #1-4 and 6-10; December 2005; 120 pages
23. Luba: Three Daughters by Gilbert Hernández; collecting stories from Luba's Comics and Stories #3-4, 6, 8, Love and Rockets vol. 2 #6, 11-16, Measles #1 and original material; August 2006; 144 pages
24. The Education of Hopey Glass by Jaime Hernández; collecting stories from Love and Rockets vol. 2 #11-19; April 2008; 128 pages
25. High Soft Lisp by Gilbert Hernández; collecting stories from Love and Rockets vol. 2 #3-9, 11, 13-15, 17-18, and Luba's Comics and Stories #7; April 2010; 144 pages
26. God and Science: Return of the Ti-Girls by Jaime Hernández; collecting stories from Love and Rockets: New Stories #1-2 and original material; July 2012; 144 pages
27. Julio's Day by Gilbert Hernández; collecting stories from Love and Rockets vol. 2 #1-14, 17-19; April 2013; 112 pages
28. The Children of Palomar by Gilbert Hernández; collecting New Tales of Old Palomar #1-3; August 2013; 104 pages (part of the Ignatz series)
29. The Love Bunglers by Jaime Hernández; collecting stories from Love and Rockets: New Stories #3-4; April 2014; 100 pages
30. Is This How You See Me? by Jaime Hernández; March 26, 2019 collecting stories from Love and Rockets: New Stories #7-8 and Love and Rockets vol. 4 #1-5; April 2019; 96 pages
31. Tonta by Jaime Hernández; collecting stories from Love and Rockets: New Stories #5-6; July 2019; 104 pages
32. Life Drawing by Jaime Hernández; collecting stories from Love and Rockets: New Stories #7-8 and Love and Rockets vol. 4 #1-2, 6-15; February 2025; 136 pages
33. Lovers and Haters by Gilbert Hernández; collecting stories from Love and Rockets: New Stories #7-8, Love and Rockets vol. 4 #1, #3, Psychodrama Illustrated #1, #5, and original material; November 2025; 120 pages
34. Love and Rockets Vol. IV - Book One by Jaime and Gilbert Hernández; collecting Love and Rockets vol. 4 #1-6; January 2027, 224 pages

==== Fritz B-Movies spin-offs ====
The following volumes by Gilbert Hernández, under the collective title Fritz B-Movies, depict the filmography of B movie actress Fritz Martinez, Luba's youngest sister. Some of them have been prepublished in the magazine, but the majority appeared directly in book form.

1. Chance in Hell, September 2007, 120 pages
2. The Troublemakers, December 2009, 128 pages
3. Love from the Shadows, May 2011, 130 pages
4. Maria M. (includes volumes 1 & 2, the first one having been published in November 2013 as a standalone book), October 2019, 232 pages
5. Hypnotwist/Scarlet by Starlight, originally from New Stories #2 and 3, February 2021, 96 pages
6. Proof that the Devil Loves You, August 2023, 96 pages

==== Love and Rockets Library ====
Volume 1 was re-released in smaller "omnibus" style trade paperbacks. Starting in 2010, volume 2's stories began getting re-releases as well. In 2018, the New Stories began being collected among the "omnibus" paperbacks.

1. Maggie the Mechanic by Jaime Hernández; Locas Book 1, collecting stories from Love and Rockets vol. 1 #1-11, 13-15, Mechanics #1-2, and Anything Goes!; February 2007; 272 pages
2. Heartbreak Soup by Gilbert Hernández; Palomar Book 1, collecting stories from Love and Rockets vol. 1 #3-10, 12-20; January 2007; 288 pages
3. The Girl from H.O.P.P.E.R.S. by Jaime Hernández; Locas Book 2, collecting stories from Love and Rockets vol. 1 #13-32; June 2007; 272 pages
4. Human Diastrophism by Gilbert Hernández; Palomar Book 2, collecting stories from Love and Rockets vol. 1 #21-26, 41-48, 50, Anything Goes! #4, The Reticent Heart and Other Stories, and Ten Years of Love and Rockets; July 2007; 288 pages
5. Perla la Loca by Jaime Hernández; Locas Book 3, collecting stories from Love and Rockets vol. 1 #33-50; November 2007; 288 pages
6. Beyond Palomar, by Gilbert Hernández; Palomar Book 3, collecting stories from Love and Rockets vol. 1 #29-40; October 2007; 256 pages
7. Amor Y Cohetes by Jaime, Gilbert & Mario Hernández; Non-Locas and Palomar comics, collecting stories from Love and Rockets vol. 1 #1-5, 9, 11-12, 16-17, 19, 21, 27-29, 40-43, 45-46, 59-50, Ten Years of Love and Rockets, and The Village Voice; April 2008; 280 pages
8. Penny Century by Jaime Hernández; Locas Book 4, collecting stories from Whoa, Nellie! #1-3, Maggie and Hopey Color Fun Special #1, Penny Century #1-7, and Love and Rockets vol. 2 #5; April 2010; 240 pages
9. Esperanza by Jaime Hernández; Locas Book 5, collecting stories from Love and Rockets vol. 2 #1-4, 6-19; August 2011; 248 pages
10. Luba and Her Family by Gilbert Hernández; Luba Book 1, collecting stories from New Love #1-6, Luba's Comics and Stories #1, Luba #1-4, and Measles #1, 6; June 2014; 312 pages
11. Ofelia by Gilbert Hernández; Luba Book 2, collecting stories from Luba's Comics and Stories #2-5, Luba #3-10, and Measles #3; January 2015; 256 pages
12. Comics Dementia by Gilbert Hernández; Non-Locas and Palomar comics; collecting stories from New Love #1-6, Love and Rockets vol. 2 #1-6, 8, 10-11, 14, and 19, Goody Good Comics #1, The Comics Journal Special Edition #1 and 4, Details Magazine #11/1992, UG!3K & Expozo, The Naked Cosmos, Centrifugal Bumble-Puppy #2, Slant Magazine, Weirdo #25, Strip AIDS U.S.A., Vortex #7, Hate #26, Mome #19, Zero Zero #7, and Measles #5; February 2016; 224 pages
13. Angels and Magpies by Jaime Hernández; Locas Book 6, collecting stories from Love and Rockets vol. 2 #20, and Love and Rockets: New Stories #1-4; December 2017; 260 pages
14. Three Sisters by Gilbert Hernández; Luba Book 3, collecting stories from Luba's Comics and Stories #3-4, 6-8, Love and Rockets vol. 2 #3-9, 11-18, and original material from Luba: Three Daughters; August 2018; 280 pages
15. Children of Palomar & Other Stories by Gilbert & Mario Hernández; Palomar Book 5 and uncollected non-Palomar stories, collecting stories from Love and Rockets vol. 2 #1-14, 17-19, New Love #6, New Tales of Old Palomar #1-3 and Love and Rockets: New Stories #1; January 2023; 280 pages

==== Hardcovers ====
Edited segments of both the Palomar and the Locas stories are available in hardcover format.

1. Palomar: The Heartbreak Soup Stories by Gilbert Hernández; collecting stories from Love and Rockets vol. 1 #3-10, 12-26, 41-44, 46, 48, 50, Anything Goes! #4, The Reticent Heart and Other Stories, Ten Years of Love and Rockets, and additional material from The Complete Love & Rockets books; November 2003; 536 pages
2. Locas: The Maggie and Hopey Stories by Jaime Hernández; collecting stories from Love and Rockets vol. 1 #2-11, 13-28, 30-50, Mechanics #1, Anything Goes! #2, and additional material from The Complete Love & Rockets books; 1st edition: October 2004, 712 pages; 2nd edition: January 2026, 720 pages
3. Luba by Gilbert Hernández; collecting stories from New Love #1-6, Luba's Comics and Stories #1-6, 8, Luba #1-10, Measles #1, 3, stories from Love and Rockets vol. 2 #11-17, 20, and additional material from The Complete Love & Rockets books; April 2009; 608 pages
4. Locas II: Maggie, Hopey, and Ray by Jaime Hernández; collecting Maggie and Hopey Color Fun Special #1, Penny Century #1-7, and stories from Love and Rockets vol. 2 #1-19; August 2009; 432 pages

== Reception ==
Writing for The Guardian in 2016, David Barnett called Love and Rockets "one of the most original and influential comic projects ever".

Rolling Stone called it the best non-superhero comic of all time in a list published in 2019.

KCET broadcast a documentary in 2022 on the comic as part of its Artbound series titled Love and Rockets: The Great American Comic Book.

Carolina A. Miranda said in the Los Angeles Times in 2023 that the Hernández brothers' works "changed U.S. comics, infusing the form with elements of Latin American folklore and Chicano life" and that "many of the stories feel as fresh and as strange as they did in 1982". She also observed, "back in the Reagan era, long before intersectionality and gender fluidity were common terms of debate, "Love and Rockets" was depicting queerness, gender and race while simultaneously exploring the spectrum and hierarchies of Latino identity — mestizo, Black and Indigenous."

In 2008, Maggie and Hopey were ranked #95 on Wizard's 200 Greatest Comic Book Characters of all time.
