= Hernández brothers =

American cartoonist brothers

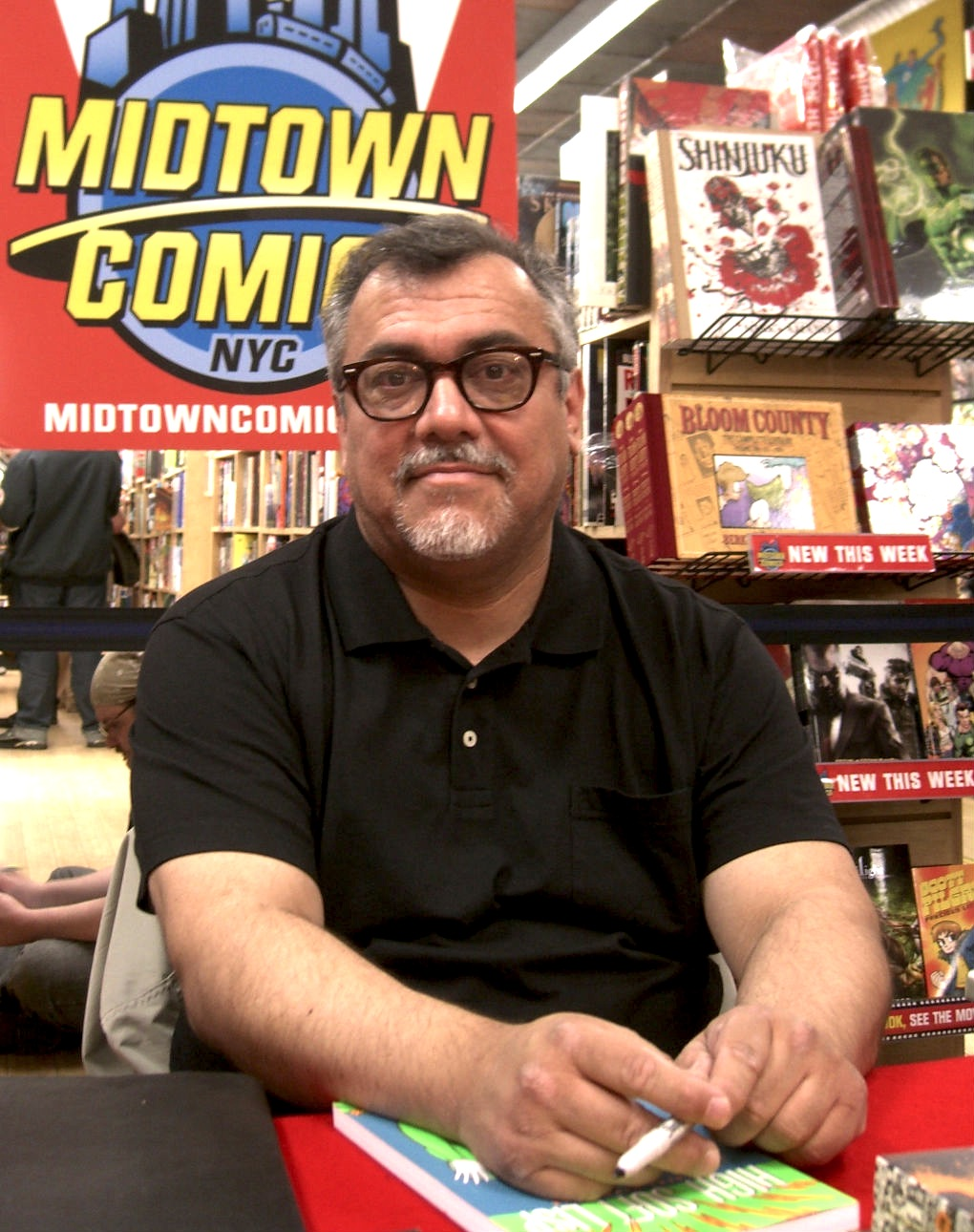
Gilbert Hernández

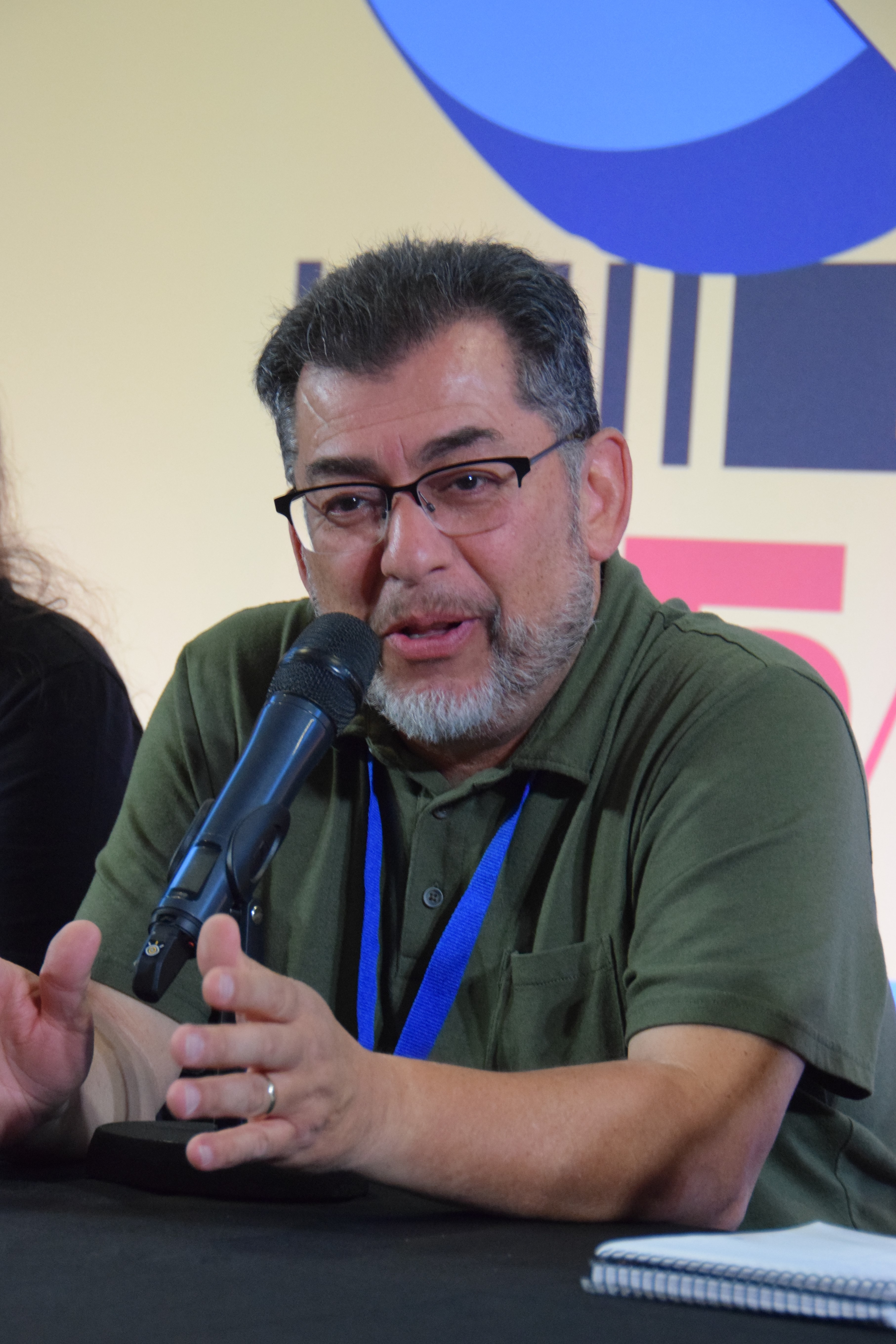
Jaime Hernández

The Hernández brothers, also known as Los Bros Hernández, are the three American cartoonist brothers Mario (b. 1953), Gilbert (b. 1957), and Jaime Hernández (b. 1959).

The brothers were born in a Mexican-American family and grew up in Oxnard, California. Their father was born in Mexico and their mother in Texas. Their father worked on the production line at a General Motors plant and died when they were young. Their mother had also read comic books when she was younger, and she still had her old ones, ranging from Classics Illustrated to Superman. She had been inspired to draw in her youth. There were five kids in the household, four boys and a girl. In the late 1960s, the brothers got into the underground comix movement through discovering a copy of Robert Crumb's Zap Comix.

In the 1980s they gained fame with their comic book Love and Rockets, a prominent series in the early alternative comics scene, and which drew from a wide range of influences, including mainstream and underground comics, punk rock, and Mexican-American culture. They began publishing the black-and-white series themselves in 1981, and Fantagraphics Books published it from 1982. The brothers normally worked independently of each other on their own stories. Gilbert's most significant work features prominent magic realist elements in Central American settings; Jaime's has centred on multicultural Southern California. Mario's contributions have been infrequent. The first volume of Love and Rockets ended after its fiftieth issue in 1996, before being revived. While Gilbert and Jaime have taken on a great variety of other projects, they frequently returned to their most familiar characters.

Despite their work reaching "literary respectability", the Hernández brothers have not become "mainstream geek touchstones" like other comics writers and artists. Although they have occasionally done mainstream work, they have rarely worked for the "Big Two", the Warner Bros.-owned DC Comics and Disney's Marvel.

Their publisher Fantagraphics coined the name Los Bros Hernández to refer to them as a form of branding. Jaime has said that the brothers themselves rejected this name, and felt it was "kind of on the racist side… like 'here are these Mexican guys.' […] I’m sure that wasn’t their intention, but that’s just kind of how we took it."
