= Mario Hernández (comics) =

Comic book author

Mario Hernández (born 1953 in Oxnard, California) is an American writer, artist, and sometime publisher of comics. He is one of the Hernández brothers, along with his younger brothers Gilbert and Jaime, with whom he co-created the acclaimed independent comic book Love and Rockets.

== Biography ==
As children, Mario (the eldest of six children) and his siblings were voracious comic readers, a habit encouraged by their mother, who had loved comics during her own childhood. Eventually, their enthusiasm for the medium led the youngsters to begin writing and drawing comics themselves for fun, collaborating with one another and sharing their own individual creations. As they grew older, Mario discovered girls and mostly abandoned his drawing hobby, but Jaime and Gilbert remained committed and prolific, accumulating hundreds of pages of increasingly sophisticated and personal work. Eventually, Mario noticed what his brothers had been up to and was so impressed by their comics that he encouraged them to try to get published. In 1982 Mario instigated and self-published a black and white comic book of his and his brothers' work, the original version of Love and Rockets No. 1. It was sold at that year's San Diego Comicon and by mail order, and advertised in comics fanzines. A copy of the issue was submitted to The Comics Journal for review, the brothers reasoning that if they could endure the Journal's notoriously harsh criticism, they were ready for anything. To their surprise, they received not only a positive review, but an offer from the Journal's publisher Fantagraphics to publish their work. The brothers agreed, and Fantagraphics published a slightly revised reprint version of the self-published issue, featuring a new full-color cover, as the first issue of an ongoing Love and Rockets series. The title quickly found a cult audience and became a key title in the 1980s independent comics movement, developing into a highly influential early example of what came to be known as "alternative" or "art" comics.

Around 1984, all three brothers were hired by Toronto-based publisher Vortex Comics to collaborate on a new series, Mister X. This project was based upon a character created by artist Dean Motter, and had already been in development for some time when the Hernández brothers became involved; the book had been heavily publicized in the comics press as a forthcoming title slated to be drawn by Paul Rivoche, who completed a substantial amount of conceptual design artwork but ultimately did not contribute any actual comics pages to the project as published. The first issues of Mister X were co-written by Gilbert and Mario based on Dean Motter's story and drawn by Jaime, but the brothers left the title after four issues over alleged nonpayment for their work, refocusing their efforts back onto Love and Rockets.

As the series continued, Mario's own comics contributions to the title became increasingly sporadic; he was a father by this time and family responsibilities left little time for his artwork. Jaime and Gilbert's work dominated Love and Rockets from the beginning both in volume and acclaim; in his own estimation Mario's work falls short of what he describes as his brothers' "genius." Eventually, Mario all but completely stopped contributing to the comic, usually writing and drawing a short story every few years for anniversary issues. In the early 1990s, Fantagraphics published Mario's one-shot comic Brain Capers, featuring non-Love and Rockets work. As of 2007, Mario's most recent contribution to Love and Rockets was "Me for the Unknown," a serial written by Mario and drawn by Gilbert. In 2009, Mario and Gilbert collaborated on a mini-series called Citizen Rex.

In 2012, Hernández was awarded the Inkpot Award. In 2023, Hernández received a PEN Oakland/Josephine Miles Literary Award for Love and Rockets: The First Fifty: The Classic 40th Anniversary Collection (Fantagraphics)
