= Jaime Hernández (comics) =

American comic artist (born 1959)

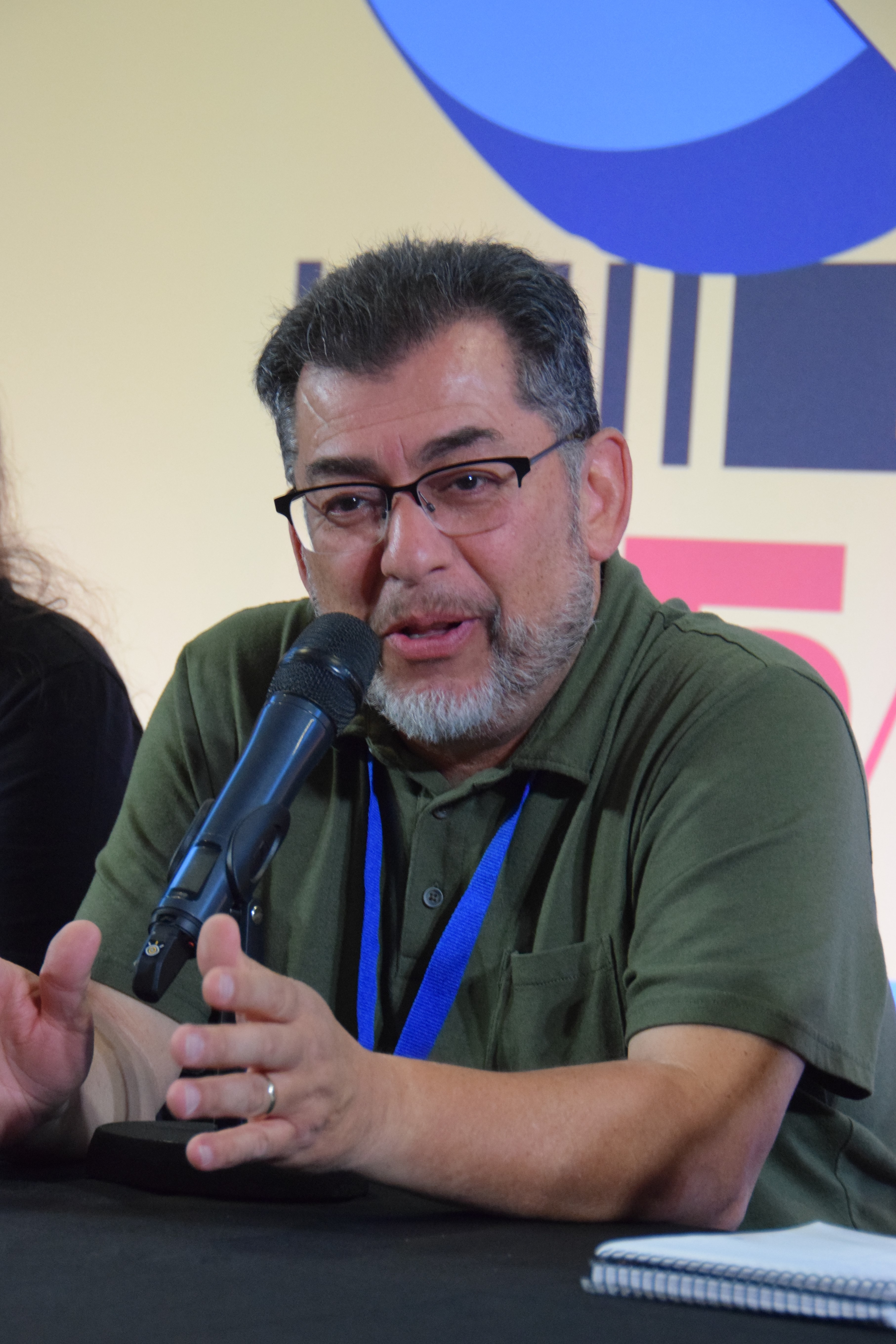
- Jaime Hernández at the International Comic Fair of Barcelona (2025)
- Born: October 10, 1959 (age 67) Oxnard, California, U.S.
- Areas: Cartoonist, Writer, Penciller, Artist, Inker
- Pseudonym: Xaime Hernández
- Notable works: Love and Rockets
- Awards: See below

Jaime (sometimes spelled Xaime) Hernández (born October 10, 1959) is an American comic artist. Along with his brothers Gilbert and Mario, he is the co-creator of the alternative comic book Love and Rockets.

== Early life ==
Jaime Hernández grew up in Oxnard, California. He is the youngest of his family, with four older brothers and one sister. His family embraced comics: their mother read them frequently and old issues were kept in large quantities in the house, to be read and re-read by all over the years. "We grew up with comics," Hernández said. "I wanted to draw comics my whole life."

They read all types of comics and enjoyed those that gave a fairly realistic depiction of family life as well as the standard superhero adventures. Hernández was particularly influenced by Hank Ketcham's Dennis the Menace and Dan DeCarlo's Archie comics. The children in his otherwise rather realistic stories are often drawn to resemble Ketcham's, and Jaime's characters often strike very "DeCarlo-esque" poses. The work of Alex Toth, Charles Schulz, Jesse Marsh and Jack Kirby were also hugely influential.

Hernández has a lifelong fascination with pro wrestling, especially women's wrestling, and it has been a regular part of his work. He has also been a lifelong punk rock fan, and it has been a constant element of his work. His Love and Rockets heroine Maggie and her friends are almost all punk fans; and some of the story follows her friend Hopey playing on tour with a band.

== Career ==
Gilbert and Jaime discuss their careers in 2016

=== Love and Rockets ===
Hernández, along with his brothers, has written and drawn the comic Love and Rockets since 1981. His main contribution is the ongoing serial narrative Locas which follows the tangled lives of a group of primarily Latina characters, from their teenage years in the early days of the California punk scene to the present day. The two central characters of Jaime's cast are Margarita Luisa "Maggie" Chascarrillo and Esperanza Leticia "Hopey" Glass, whose on-again, off-again, open romance is a focus for many Locas storylines. Early on, the stories switched back and forth between Maggie's sci-fi adventures journeying around the world and working as a "prosolar" mechanic repairing rocketships, and much more realistic stories of Maggie and her friends in a grungy, mostly Latin California neighborhood known as "Hoppers". Eventually Hernández dropped almost all of the sci-fi elements, although he does still occasionally include references to the earlier stories and he still does very occasional short stories about superheroines, robots and other sci-fi genre elements.

The Hernández brothers originally ended Love and Rockets with issue 50 in 1996, and stated that they would be doing solo books from then on. For the next few years, the brothers released many solo books, with Jaime doing several books featuring his Locas characters (including Whoa Nellie, Penny Century, and Maggie and Hopey Color Fun) and Maggie generally occupying a supporting role. Eventually they resumed doing Love and Rockets and Maggie again took center stage, but instead of the large, magazine-style format of the original issues, the book was now released in a more traditional comic book format.

The entire Locas storyline to date was collected into one 700 page graphic novel in 2004. In 2006, Publishers Weekly ranked Hernández's work Ghost of Hoppers second on its critics' poll of the best comic books of 2006.

Between 2008 and 2016 the comic was released as an annual graphic-novel size issue, called Love and Rockets: New Stories. In 2012 a collection of stories from issues #1 and 2 of this was published titled God and Science: Return of the Ti-Girls, which Glen Weldon for NPR called "the brightest, purest, most quintessentially superheroic superhero yarn in years." In 2014 another collection was published titled The Love Bunglers, which won the Los Angeles Times Book Prize for Graphic Novel/Comics.

In 2016 Love and Rockets returned to its original, magazine-sized, format. Two further collections of Hernández's recent stories for the comic were published in 2019, Is This How You See Me? and Tonta. His next collection Life Drawing, published in 2025, again won the Los Angeles Times Book Prize for Graphic Novel/Comics.

Hernández has been praised for the physical beauty of his female characters as well as their complex personalities. His female characters struggle with their body image, openly discuss their physique, and come in a variety of shapes and sizes. He has said that Maggie and Ray Dominguez both represent different aspects of his own personality.

=== Other work ===
Hernandez discussing the importance of punk in 2016 (alongside Ed Piskor, discussing hip hop)

In addition to Love and Rockets stories, Hernández has also done occasional work for the New York Times and The New Yorker. He has made the album art for records including Lung Leg's Maid to Minx, Michelle Shocked's Captain Swing, the Indigo Girls' All That We Let In, and Los Lobos' The Town and the City. Earlier in his career Hernández drew flyers for Southern California punk bands such as the Circle Jerks and Suicidal Tendencies. He also did album covers for some "Nardcore" punk bands, such as Ill Repute and Dr. Know, the latter of whom featured his brother Ismael on bass.

In 1984-85 Gilbert, Mario and Jaime collaborated on Mister X, a sci-fi comic book series from Vortex Press, with Jaime handling the art and Gilbert and Mario plotting. The book's noirish look has been cited as an influence by the creators of Batman: The Animated Series among other retro-futuristic works. The Hernández brothers themselves hold little affection for it, however, with Gilbert once describing it being "like a bad zit... it just sort of happened." The Hernández brothers left the book when Vortex failed to pay them in full. Responding to the non-payment accusations, publisher Bill Marks said "I don't dispute that one bit. And they'll be paid every nickel of it, or every quarter of it." The Hernández brothers were indeed ultimately paid for their work on Mister X in 1988.

In 2018 a children's comic by Hernández titled The Dragon Slayer - Folktales from Latin America was published by Toon Books.

== Awards ==
- 1986 Kirby Award – Best Artist, Best Black-and-White Comic (Love and Rockets)
- 1986 Inkpot Award
- 1989 Harvey Award – Best Continuing or Limited Series (Love and Rockets)
- 1990 Harvey Award – Best Continuing or Limited Series (Love and Rockets)
- 1992 Harvey Award – Best Inker (Love and Rockets)
- 1998 Harvey Award – Best New Series (Penny Century)
- 1999 Harvey Award – Best Single Issue (Penny Century #3)
- 2000 Harvey Award – Best Inker (Penny Century)
- 2001 Harvey Award – Best Artist or Penciller (Penny Century)
- 2003 Harvey Award – Best Inker (Love and Rockets)
- 2004 Harvey Award – Best Single Issue or Story (Love and Rockets #9)
- 2006 Harvey Award – Best Single Issue (Love and Rockets, Volume 2, #15)
- 2007 Harvey Award – Best Cartoonist (Love and Rockets)
- 2012 Ignatz Award - Outstanding Artist (Love and Rockets New Stories)
- 2013 Harvey Award - Best Cartoonist (Love and Rockets New Stories)
- 2014 Eisner Award - Best Writer/Artist (Love and Rockets New Stories #6)
- 2014 Los Angeles Times Book Prize - Best Graphic Novel/Comics (The Love Bunglers)
- 2023 PEN Oakland/Josephine Miles Literary Award for Love and Rockets: The First Fifty: The Classic 40th Anniversary Collection (Fantagraphics)
- 2026 Los Angeles Times Book Prize - Best Graphic Novel/Comics (Life Drawing)
