= Pogo (comic strip) =

American comic strip

- Pogo daily strip from Earth Day 1971
- Author: Walt Kelly
- Current status/schedule: Concluded
- Launch date: October 4, 1948; 78 years ago (as a newspaper strip)
- End date: July 20, 1975; 51 years ago
- Syndicate: Post-Hall Syndicate
- Publisher(s): Simon & Schuster, Fantagraphics Books, Gregg Press, Eclipse Comics, Spring Hollow Books
- Genre(s): Humor, satire, politics

Pogo (revived as Walt Kelly's Pogo) is a comic strip created by American cartoonist Walt Kelly and syndicated in American newspapers from 1948 until 1975. Set in the Okefenokee Swamp in the Southeastern United States, Pogo followed the adventures of its anthropomorphic animal characters, including the title character, an opossum. The strip was written for both children and adults, with layers of social and political satire targeted to the latter. Pogo was distributed by the Post-Hall Syndicate. The strip earned Kelly a Reuben Award in 1951.

== History ==
Walter Crawford Kelly Jr. was born in Philadelphia on August 25, 1913. His family moved to Bridgeport, Connecticut, when he was only two. He went to California at age 22 to work on Donald Duck cartoons at Walt Disney Studios in 1935. He stayed until the animators' strike in 1941 as an animator on The Nifty Nineties, The Little Whirlwind, Pinocchio, Fantasia, Dumbo and The Reluctant Dragon. Kelly then worked for Dell Comics, a division of Western Publishing of Racine, Wisconsin.

=== Dell Comics ===
Kelly created the characters of Pogo the possum and Albert the alligator in 1941 for issue No. 1 of Dell's Animal Comics in the story "Albert Takes the Cake". Both were comic foils for a young black character named Bumbazine (a corruption of bombazine, a fabric that was usually dyed black and used largely for mourning wear), who lived in the swamp. Bumbazine was retired early, since Kelly found it hard to write for a human child. He eventually phased humans out of the comics entirely, preferring to use the animal characters for their comic potential. Kelly said he used animals—nature's creatures, or "nature's screechers" as he called them—"largely because you can do more with animals. They don't hurt as easily, and it's possible to make them more believable in an exaggerated pose." Pogo, formerly a "spear carrier" according to Kelly, quickly took center stage, assuming the straight man role that Bumbazine had occupied.

=== New York Star ===
In his 1954 autobiography for the Hall Syndicate, Kelly said he "fooled around with the Foreign Language Unit of the Army during World War II, illustrating grunts and groans, and made friends in the newspaper and publishing business." In 1948 he was hired to draw political cartoons for the editorial page of the short-lived New York Star; he decided to do a daily comic strip featuring the characters from Animal Comics. The first comic series to make the permanent transition to newspapers, Pogo debuted on October 4, 1948, and ran continuously until the paper folded on January 28, 1949.

=== Syndication ===
On May 16, 1949, Pogo was picked up for national distribution by the Post-Hall Syndicate. George Ward and Henry Shikuma were among Kelly's assistants on the strip. It ran continuously until (and past) Kelly's death from complications of diabetes on October 18, 1973. According to Walt Kelly's widow Selby Kelly, Walt Kelly fell ill in 1972 and was unable to continue the strip. At first, reprints, mostly with minor rewording in the word balloons, from the 1950s and 1960s were used, starting Sunday, June 4, 1972. Kelly returned for just eight Sunday pages, from October 8 to November 26, 1972, but according to Selby was unable to draw the characters as large as he customarily did. The reprints with minor rewording returned, continuing until Kelly's death. Other artists, notably Don Morgan, worked on the strip. Selby Kelly began to draw the strip with the Christmas strip from 1973 from scripts by Walt's son Stephen. The strip ended July 20, 1975. Selby Kelly said in a 1982 interview that she decided to discontinue the strip because newspapers had shrunk the size of strips to the point where people could not easily read it.

=== 1989–1993 revival ===
Starting on January 8, 1989, the Los Angeles Times Syndicate revived the strip under the title Walt Kelly's Pogo, written by Larry Doyle and drawn by Neal Sternecky. Doyle left the strip as of February 24, 1991, and Sternecky took over as both writer and artist until March 22, 1992. After Sternecky left, Kelly's son Peter and daughter Carolyn continued to produce the daily strip until October 2, 1993. The strip continued to run for a couple months with reprints of Doyle and Sternecky's work, and came to an end on November 28, 1993.

== Characters ==
Pogo: Opossum. The central figure in the strip, entirely benign and friendly, but not always real smart.

Porky Pine: Porcupine. Pogo's best buddy and wingman, the only main character in the strip who's consistently intelligent and sensible. Sardonic and ironic; doesn't talk much. Wears a scotch bonnet. Best quote of the series: "Don't take life so serious, son. It ain't nohow permanent."

Howland Owl: Owl. Purports to be the most educated character but is very prone to silly schemes and conspiracy theories. Often wears a conical wizard hat. Usually paired with Churchy.

Churchy La Femme: Turtle. Usually involved with Howland's schemes, but even dumber. Often wears a pirate hat. Panics once a month; "Friday the 13th falls on a [day of week] this month!"

Albert: Alligator. Not too bright. Usually up to something. Constant cigar.

Miz Mam'selle Hepzibah: Skunk. French, sexy, has a crush on Pogo (which everyone but Pogo knows).

Beauregard: Hound dog.

Snavely: Snake.

Miz Beaver: Beaver, with bonnet and apron. The Granny Clampett of the strip.

Rackety Coon: Raccoon.

Rackety Coon Chile: Young raccoon, usually playing with an alligator child buddy.

Seminole Sam: Fox. Con man.

P.T. Bridgeport: Bear. Showman, a takeoff on Barnum. Speech balloons in circus poster fonts.

Grundoon: Baby groundhog. Never says anything but "jes' fine".

Deacon Mushrat: Exactly. Speech balloons in gothic font.

Pup Dog: The only recurring non-anthropomorphic character.

Bewitched, Bothered, and Bemildred: Bats. Hobos.

Bun Rab: Rabbit. Usually beating a drum with a marching-band hat.

Tamannany: Tiger.

Wiley Catt: Bobcat. Gun-happy, racist, unfriendly hillbilly.

Sarcophagus Macabre: Vulture. Okeefenokee's undertaker.

Cowbirds: Communists..

Molester Mole: Nearly blind.

Sis Boombah: Hen. Large and loud.

== Dialogue and "swamp-speak" ==
The strip was notable for its distinctive and whimsical use of language. Kelly, a native northeasterner, had a sharply perceptive ear for language and used it to great humorous effect. The predominant vernacular in Pogo, sometimes referred to as "swamp-speak", is essentially a rural southern U.S. dialect laced with nonstop malapropisms, fractured grammar, "creative" spelling and mangled polysyllables such as "incredibobble," "hysteriwockle", and "redickledockle," plus invented words such as the exasperated exclamations "Bazz Fazz!", "Rowrbazzle!" and "Moomph!" Here is an example:

Pogo has been engaged in his favorite pastime, fishing in the swamp from a flat-bottomed boat, and has hooked a small catfish. "Ha!" he exclaims, "A small fry!" At this point Hoss-Head the Champeen Catfish, bigger than Pogo himself, rears out of the swamp, and the following dialogue ensues:

Hoss-Head [with fins on hips and an angry scowl]: Chonk back that catfish chile, Pogo, afore I whops you!
Pogo: Yassuree, Champeen Hoss-Head, yassuh yassuh yassuh yassuh yassuh ... [tosses infant catfish back in water]
Pogo [walks away, muttering discontentedly]: Things gettin' so humane 'round this swamp, us folks will have to take up eatin' MUD TURKLES!
Churchy (a turtle) [eavesdropping from behind a tree with Howland Owl]: Horroars! A cannibobble! [passes out]
Howland [holding the unconscious Churchy]: You say you gone eat mud turkles! Ol' Churchy is done overcame!
Pogo: It was a finger of speech—I apologize! Why, I LOVES yo', Churchy LaFemme!
Churchy [suddenly recovered from his swoon]: With pot licker an' black-eye peas, you loves me, sir—HA! Us is through, Pogo!

== Satire and politics ==
Kelly used Pogo to comment on the human condition, and, from time to time, this drifted into politics. "I finally came to understand that if I were looking for comic material, I would never have to look long," Kelly wrote. "The news of the day would be enough. Perhaps the complexion of the strip changed a little in that direction after 1951. After all, it is pretty hard to walk past an unguarded gold mine and remain empty-handed."

Pogo was a reluctant "candidate" for President (although he never campaigned) in 1952 and 1956. (The phrase "I Go Pogo", originally a parody of Dwight D. Eisenhower's iconic campaign slogan "I Like Ike", appeared on giveaway promotional lapel pins featuring Pogo, and it was also used by Kelly as a book title.) A 1952 campaign rally at Harvard degenerated into chaos sufficient to be officially termed a riot, and police responded. The Pogo Riot was a significant event for the class of '52; for its 25th reunion, Pogo was the official mascot.

Kelly's interest in keeping the strip topical meant that he sometimes worked closer to the deadline than the syndicate wanted. "The syndicates and the newspapers always like to stay about eight weeks in advance," Kelly said in a 1959 interview, "but because I like to stay as topical as I can and because I'm sure something will always come up that I'd like to comment on, I try to keep it somewhere between four and six weeks. Even then it gets rather difficult to forecast what is going to happen six weeks, four weeks, ahead of time. For example, I have a sequence coming on this moonshot that the Russians made. I was able to file it just by a month, but I wish I had known about it a little in advance because I could have hit it right on the nose."

=== Simple J. Malarkey ===
Perhaps the most famous example of the strip's satirical edge came into being on May 1, 1953, when Kelly introduced a friend of Mole's: a wildcat named "Simple J. Malarkey", an obvious caricature of Senator Joseph McCarthy. This showed significant courage on Kelly's part, considering the influence the politician wielded at the time and the possibility of scaring away subscribing newspapers.

When The Providence Bulletin issued an ultimatum in 1954, threatening to drop the strip if Malarkey's face appeared in the strip again, Kelly had Malarkey throw a bag over his head as Miss "Sis" Boombah (a Rhode Island Red hen) approached, explaining "no one from Providence should see me!" Kelly thought Malarkey's new look was especially appropriate because the bag over his head resembled a Klansman's hood. (Kelly later attacked the Klan directly, in a comic nightmare parable called "The Kluck Klams", included in The Pogo Poop Book, 1966.)

Malarkey appeared in the strip only once after that sequence ended, during Kelly's tenure, on October 15, 1955. Again his face was covered, this time by his speech balloons as he stood on a soapbox shouting to general uninterest. Kelly had planned to defy the threats made by the Bulletin and show Malarkey's face, but decided it was more fun to see how many people recognized the character and the man he lampooned by speech patterns alone. When Kelly got letters of complaint about kicking the senator when he was down (McCarthy had been censured by that time, and had lost most of his influence), Kelly responded, "They identified him, I didn't."

Malarkey reappeared on April 1, 1989, when the strip had been resurrected by Larry Doyle and Neal Sternecky. It was hinted that he was a ghost. (A gag used several times in the original strip, for both Wiley Catt and Simple J Malarkey, was his unexpected reappearance to the Swamp with a frightened regular saying "I didn't know you was alive" - responded to with "Would you stop shakin' if I tole you...I AIN'T?!"

=== Later politics ===
As the 1960s loomed, even foreign "gummint" figures found themselves caricatured in the pages of Pogo, including in 1962 communist leaders Fidel Castro, who appeared as an agitator goat named Fido, and Nikita Khrushchev, who emerged as both an unnamed Russian bear and a pig. Other Soviet characters include a pair of cosmonaut seals who arrive at the swamp in 1959 via Sputnik, initiating a topical spoof of the Space Race. In 1964, the strip spoofed the presidential election with P.T. Bridgeport providing wind-up dolls that looked like Richard Nixon, Nelson Rockefeller and George W. Romney. The wind-up caricatures of Richard Nixon, Nelson Rockefeller, George W. Romney, Ronald Reagan, Eugene McCarthy and Robert F. Kennedy appeared in 1968, during the presidential election.

Lyndon B. Johnson appeared in two caricatures in the strip. In 1966, he appeared as "The Loan Arranger," a character that Pogo, Albert, and Churchy La Femme met in Pandamonia. In a reference to Johnson's Texas heritage, the Loan Arranger was a centaur, half-human, half-horse, wearing a cowboy hat that was pulled down over his eyes, with Johnson's famous chin visible beneath it. He also wore a cowboy shirt and a bandolier of bullets around his waist. Kelly satirized the Vietnam War by having the Loan Arranger compete against Gwhan Shi Foah (a Buddha-like caricature of Mao Zedong) in a hand-shaking contest, for the right to "protect" a young Asian girl named Sha-Lan (representing South Vietnam). Later, during the 1968 presidential election, Johnson reappeared in the strip as an aging, bespectacled Texas longhorn who knew his time was fading and was trying to make a graceful exit.

Because some newspapers were wary of printing political satire on the comics page, Kelly sometimes drew two strips for the same day — the regular satirical Pogo strip, and a less-pointed version that he called the "Bunny Rabbit" strips. The 1982 book The Best of Pogo reprinted some of the alternate strips from the presidential election years of 1964 and 1968.

In the early 1970s, Kelly used a collection of characters he called "the Bulldogs" to mock the secrecy and paranoia of the Nixon administration. The Bulldogs included caricatures of J. Edgar Hoover (dressed in an overcoat and fedora, and directing a covert bureau of identical frog operatives), Spiro Agnew (portrayed as an unnamed hyena festooned in ornate military regalia, a parody of the ridiculous uniforms supplied to the White House guards), and John Mitchell (portrayed as a pipe-smoking eaglet wearing high-top sneakers.)

== Nonsense verse and song parodies ==
Kelly was an accomplished poet and frequently added pages of original comic verse to his Pogo reprint books, complete with cartoon illustrations. The odd song parody or nonsense poem also occasionally appeared in the newspaper strip. In 1956, Kelly published Songs of the Pogo, an illustrated collection of his original songs, with lyrics by Kelly and music by Kelly and Norman Monath. The tunes were also issued on a vinyl LP, with Kelly himself contributing to the vocals.

The best known of Kelly's nonsense verses is "Deck Us All with Boston Charlie", the swamp creatures' mondegreen of the Christmas carol "Deck the Halls". Each year at Christmas time, it was traditional for the strip to publish at least the first stanza:

Deck us all with Boston Charlie,
Walla Walla Wash., and Kalamazoo!
Nora's freezin' on the trolley
Swaller dollar cauliflower alleygaroo
Don't we know archaic barrel
Lullaby, lilla boy, Louisville Lou
Trolley Molly don't love Harold
Boola boola Pensacoola hullabaloo

Some years also included other verses and versions: for example, the dog Beauregard knew it as "Bark us all bow-wows of folly, Polly wolly cracker 'n' too-da-loo!"

"Deck Us All with Boston Charlie" was recorded in 1961 by Lambert, Hendricks, and Ross for the album Jingle Bell Jazz.

== Personal references ==
Walt Kelly frequently had his characters poling around the swamp in a flat-bottomed skiff. Invariably, it had a name on the side that was a personal reference of Kelly's: the name of a friend, a political figure, a fellow cartoonist, or the name of a newspaper, its editor or publisher. The name changed from one day to the next, and even from panel to panel in the same strip, but it was usually a tribute to a real-life person Kelly wished to salute in print.

== Awards and recognition ==
Long before I could grasp the satirical significance of his stuff, I was enchanted by Kelly's magnificent artwork ... We'll never see anything like Pogo again in the funnies, I'm afraid.

— Jeff MacNelly, from Pogo Even Better, 1984

A good many of us used hoopla and hype to sell our wares, but Kelly didn't need that. It seemed he simply emerged, was there, and was recognized for what he was, a true natural genius of comic art ... Hell, he could draw a tree that would send God and Joyce Kilmer back to the drawing board.

— Mort Walker, from Outrageously Pogo, 1985

The creator and series have received a great deal of recognition over the years. Walt Kelly has been compared to authors and storytellers as various as James Joyce, Lewis Carroll, Aesop, and Joel Chandler Harris (Uncle Remus). His skills as a humorous illustrator of animals have been celebrated alongside those of John Tenniel, A. B. Frost, T. S. Sullivant, Heinrich Kley and Lawson Wood. In his essay "The Decline of the Comics" (Canadian Forum, January 1954), the literary critic Hugh MacLean classified American comic strips into four types: daily gag, adventure, soap opera and "an almost lost comic ideal: the disinterested comment on life's pattern and meaning." In the fourth type, according to MacLean, there were only two: Pogo and Li'l Abner. When the first Pogo collection was published in 1951, Anthony Boucher and J. Francis McComas declared that "nothing comparable has happened in the history of the comic strip since George Herriman's Krazy Kat."

"Carl Sandburg said that many comics were too sad, but, 'I Go Pogo.' Francis Taylor, Director of the Metropolitan Museum, said before the Herald Tribune Forum: 'Pogo has not yet supplanted Shakespeare or the King James Version of the Bible in our schools.' " Kelly was elected president of the National Cartoonists Society in 1954, serving until 1956. He was the first strip cartoonist invited to contribute originals to the Library of Congress.

- Kelly received the National Cartoonists Society's Billy DeBeck Memorial Award for Cartoonist of the Year in 1951. (When the award name was changed in 1954, Kelly also retroactively received a Reuben statuette.)
- The prestigious Silver T-Square is awarded, by unanimous vote of the NCS board of directors, to persons who have demonstrated outstanding dedication or service to the Society or the profession; Kelly received one in 1972.
- The Comic-Con International Inkpot Award was given to Kelly posthumously in 1989.
- Kelly is one of only 31 artists elected to the Hall of Fame of the National Cartoon Museum (formerly the International Museum of Cartoon Art).
- Kelly was also inducted into the Will Eisner Award Hall of Fame in 1995.
- The Fantagraphics Pogo collections were a top vote-getter for the Comics Buyer's Guide Fan Award for Favorite Reprint Graphic Album for 1998.

== Influence and legacy ==
Walt Kelly's work has influenced a number of prominent comic artists:

- From 1951 to 1954, Famous Studios animator Irv Spector drew the syndicated Coogy strip, which was heavily influenced by Kelly's work, for the New York Herald-Tribune.
- In the Calvin and Hobbes Tenth Anniversary Book, cartoonist Bill Watterson listed Pogo as one of the three greatest influences on Calvin and Hobbes, along with Peanuts and Krazy Kat.
- Pogo has been cited as an influence by Jeff MacNelly (Shoe), Garry Trudeau (Doonesbury), Bill Holbrook (Kevin and Kell ) and Mark O'Hare (Citizen Dog), among others. MacNelly also gave a speech praising the strip and all of Walt Kelly's work that was published in the book Outrageously Pogo, which was a collection of praise of the strip.
- René Goscinny and Albert Uderzo were both admirers of Pogo, and many of Walt Kelly's visual devices resurfaced in Astérix. For example, the Goths speak in blackletter text, and a Roman tax-collector speaks in bureaucratic forms.
- Jim Henson acknowledged Kelly as a major influence on his sense of humor, and he based some early Muppet designs on Kelly drawings. One episode of The Muppet Show's first season included a performance of "Don't Sugar Me" from Songs of the Pogo.
- Robert Crumb cites Pogo as an influence on Animal Town, an early series of comic strips he drew with his brother Charles that later formed the basis for R. Crumb's Fritz the Cat.
- Harvey Kurtzman parodied Pogo as "Gopo Gossum" for the comic book Mad No. 23, published by EC Comics in 1955. It was the first of many Mad references to Pogo, most of them drawn by Wally Wood. According to The Best of Pogo (1982), "Walt Kelly was well aware of the Mad parodies, and loved them." Kelly directly acknowledged Wally Wood, and even had Albert spell out his name in Pogo Extra: Election Special (1960).
- Writer Alan Moore and artist Shawn McManus made the January 1985 issue (#32) of Saga of the Swamp Thing a tribute to Pogo (titled "Pog"), with Kellyesque wordplay and artwork.
- Jeff Smith acknowledged that his Bone comic book series was strongly influenced by Walt Kelly's work. Smith and Peter Kelly contributed artwork of the cast of Bone meeting Pogo and Albert for the 1998 "Pogofest" celebration.
- Jonathan Lemon cites Pogo as an inspiration or more as a "hero" for his comic strip "Rabbits Against Magic"
- American rock band Kaleidoscope released a song named "Lulu Arfin Nanny" on their 1970 album "Bernice".
- They Might Be Giants' song "Ana Ng" references a Pogo strip in its lyrics, and they have also covered "Whence That Wince" and "Lines Upon A Tranquil Brow" from Songs of the Pogo. John Linnell has said that Songs of the Pogo "was an important record in my childhood".

== Pogo in other media ==
At its peak, Walt Kelly's possum appeared in nearly 500 newspapers in 14 countries. Pogo's exploits were collected into more than four dozen books, which collectively sold close to 30 million copies. Pogo already had had a successful life in comic books, previous to syndication. The increased visibility of the newspaper strip and popular trade paperback titles allowed Kelly's characters to branch into other media, such as television, children's records, and even a theatrical film.

In addition, Walt Kelly appeared as himself on television at least twice. He was interviewed live by Edward R. Murrow for the CBS program Person to Person, in an episode originally broadcast on January 14, 1954. Kelly can also be seen briefly in the 1970 NBC special This Is Al Capp talking candidly about his friend, the creator of Li'l Abner.

=== Comic books and periodicals ===
All comic book titles are published by Dell Publishing Company, unless otherwise noted:

- Albert the Alligator and Pogo Possum (1945–1946) Dell Four Color issues #105 and 148
- Animal Comics (1947) issues #17, 23–25
- Pogo Possum (1949–1954) issues #1–16
- "Pogo's Papa" by Murray Robinson, from Collier's Weekly (March 8, 1952)
- Pogo Parade (1953), a compilation of previously published Dell Pogo stories
- Pogo Coloring Book (1953) Whitman Publishing
- "Pogo: The Funnies are Getting Funny" from Newsweek (June 21, 1954) Pogo cover painting by Kelly
- "Pogo Meets a Possum" by Walt Kelly, from Collier's Weekly (April 29, 1955)
- "Bright Christmas Land" from Newsweek (December 26, 1955) Pogo cover painting by Kelly
- "Pogo Looks at the Abominable Snowman", from Saturday Review (August 30, 1958) Pogo cover illustration by Kelly
- Pogo Primer for Parents: TV Division (1961), a public services giveaway booklet distributed by the US HEW
- Pogo Coloring Book (1964) Treasure Books (different from the 1953 book of the same name)
- Pogo: Welcome to the Beginning (1965), a public services giveaway pamphlet distributed by the Neighborhood Youth Corps
- Pogo: Bienvenidos al Comienzo (1965), Spanish-language version of the above title
- "The Pogofenokee Swamp" from Jack and Jill (May 1969)
- The Okefenokee Star (1977–1982), a privately published fanzine devoted to Walt Kelly and Pogo
- The Comics Journal No. 140 (Feb. 1991) Special Walt Kelly Issue
- "Al Capp and Walt Kelly: Pioneers of Political and Social Satire in the Comics" by Kalman Goldstein, from The Journal of Popular Culture; Vol. 25, Issue 4 (Spring 1992)

=== Music and recordings ===
- Songs of the Pogo (1956): A vinyl LP collecting 18 of Kelly's verses (most of which had previously appeared in Pogo books) set to music by both Kelly and orchestra leader Norman Monath. While professional singers (including Bob McGrath, later famous as "Bob" on the children's television show Sesame Street) provided most of the vocals on the album, Kelly himself contributed lead vocals on "Go Go Pogo" (for which he also composed the music) and "Lines Upon a Tranquil Brow", as well as a spoken portion for "Man's Best Friend". Mike Stewart, who was later known for singing the theme song of Bat Masterson, sang "Whence that Wince", "Evidence" and "Whither the Starling".
- A "sampler" from Songs of the Pogo was issued on vinyl 45 at the same time. The three-track record included "Go Go Pogo" and "Lines Upon a Tranquil Brow" sung by Walt Kelly, and "Don't Sugar Me" sung by Fia Karin with "orchestra and chorus under the direction of Jimmy Carroll". The recording was issued by Simon and Schuster, with only ASCAP 100A and B as recording numbers.
- The Firehouse Five Plus 2 Goes South (1956): LP, with liner notes and back album sleeve illustration by Walt Kelly. (Good Time Jazz)
- Jingle Bell Jazz, (Columbia LP CS 8693, issued October 17, 1962, reissued as Harmony KH-32529 on September 28, 1973, with one substitution; The Harmony issue was reissued as Columbia Jazz Odyssey Stereo LP PC 36803), a collection of a dozen jazz Christmas songs by different performers, includes "Deck Us All with Boston Charlie" recorded on May 4, 1961, by Lambert, Hendricks, & Ross with the Ike Isaacs Trio. The recording features a center section of Jon Hendricks scatting to the melody, with Kelly's lyrics sung as introduction and close.
- NO! with Pogo (1969): 45 rpm record for children, narrated and sung by "P. T. Bridgeport" (Kelly) with The Carillon Singers; came with a color storybook illustrated by Kelly. (Columbia Book & Record Library/Lancelot Press)
- CAN'T! with Pogo (1969): 45 rpm record for children, same credits as above.
- The Comics Journal Interview CD (2002): Contains 15–20-minute excerpts with five of the most influential cartoonists in the American comics industry: Charles Schulz, Jack Kirby, Walt Kelly (interviewed by Gil Kane in 1969) and R. Crumb. From the liner notes: "Hear these cartoonists in their own words, discussing the craft that made them famous" (Fantagraphics).
- Songs of the Pogo was released on CD in 2004 by Reaction Records (Urbana, Illinois), including previously unreleased material.

=== Animation and puppetry ===
Three animated cartoons were created to date based on Pogo:

- The Pogo Special Birthday Special was produced and directed by animator Chuck Jones in honor of the strip's 20th anniversary in 1969. It starred June Foray as the voice of both Pogo and Hepzibah, with Kelly and Jones contributing voice work as well. The critical consensus is that the special, which first aired on NBC-TV on May 18, 1969, failed to capture the charm of the comic strip. Kelly was not pleased with the results, and it was generally disliked by critics and fans of the comic strip.
- Walt and Selby Kelly themselves wrote and animated We Have Met the Enemy and He Is Us (the title an allusion to a line from Oliver Hazard Perry's historic message to General William Henry Harrison, "We have met the enemy and they are ours.") in 1970, largely out of Kelly's dissatisfaction with the Birthday Special. The short, with its anti-pollution message, was animated and colored by hand. While the project went unfinished due to Kelly's ill health, the storyboards for the cartoon helped form the first half of the book of the same title.
- The theatrical, feature-length motion picture I Go Pogo (a.k.a. Pogo for President) was released in late August 1980. Directed by Marc Paul Chinoy, this stop motion animated feature starred the voices of Skip Hinnant as Pogo; Ruth Buzzi as Miz Beaver and Hepzibah; Stan Freberg as Albert; Arnold Stang as Churchy; Jonathan Winters as Porky, Mole, and Wiley Catt; Kelly's friend, New York journalist Jimmy Breslin as P. T. Bridgeport; and Vincent Price as the Deacon.

The Birthday Special and I Go Pogo were released on home video throughout the 1980s and 1990s. The Birthday Special was released on VHS by MGM/UA Home Video in 1986 and they alongside Turner Entertainment released it on VHS again on August 1, 1992.

I Go Pogo was handled by Fotomat for its original VHS and Betamax release in September 1980. HBO premiered a re-cut version of the film in October 1982, with added narration by Len Maxwell; this version would continue to air on HBO for some time, and then on other cable movie stations like Cinemax, TMC, and Showtime, until around February 1991. Walt Disney Home Video released a similar cut of the film in 1984, with some deleted scenes added/restored. This version of the film was released on VHS again on December 4, 1989, by United American Video to the "sell through" home video market.

== Licensing and promotion ==
Pogo also branched out from the comic pages into consumer products—including TV sponsor tie-ins to the Birthday Special—although not nearly to the degree of other contemporary comic strips, such as Peanuts. Selby Kelly has attributed the comparative paucity of licensed material to Kelly's pickiness about the quality of merchandise attached to his characters.

- 1951: Special Delivery Pogo, a 16-page promotional mailer from the Post-Hall Syndicate, designed to spark interest and boost circulation of the new strip.
- 1952: "I Go Pogo" tin litho lapel pinback. Approx. 1 inch in diameter, with Pogo's face on a yellow background; issued as a promotional giveaway during the 1952 presidential election.
- 1954: Walt Kelly's Pogo Mobile (issued by Simon and Schuster) was a 22-piece hanging mobile, die-cut from heavy cardboard in bright colors. Came unassembled, and included Pogo on a cow jumping over a crescent-shaped Swiss cheese moon, with Okefenokee characters sitting on the Moon or in a filigreed frame.
- 1959: Rare porcelain figurine of a sitting Pogo, with a bird in a nest atop his head; made in Ireland by Wade Ceramics Ltd.
- 1968: Set of 30 celluloid pinback buttons, quite rare. Approx. 1.75 inches in diameter, issued during the 1968 presidential elections.
- 1968: Set of 10 color character decals, very rare; coincided with the set of election pinbacks
- 1968: Poynter Products of Ohio issued a set of six plastic figures (now very rare) with glued-on artificial fur: Pogo, Albert, Beauregard, Churchy, Howland and Hepzibah. The figures displeased Kelly, but are highly sought after by fans.
- 1969: Six vinyl giveaway figures of Pogo, Albert, Beauregard, Churchy, Howland and Porkypine, packaged with Procter & Gamble soap products (Spic and Span, Top Job, etc.) as a tie-in with the Pogo animated TV special. Also known as the Oxydol figures, they are fairly common and easy to find. Walt Kelly was not satisfied with the initial sculpting, and—using plasticine clay—resculpted them himself.
- 1969: Six plastic giveaway cups with full-color character decals of Pogo, Albert, Beauregard, Churchy, Howland and Porkypine, coincided with the Oxydol figures.
- 1969: Pogo Halloween costume, manufactured by Ben Cooper.
- 1980: View-Master I Go Pogo set, 3 reels and booklet, GAF
- 2002: Dark Horse Comics issued two limited edition figures of Pogo and Albert as part of their line of Classic Comic Characters—statues No. 24 and No. 25, respectively.

== Book collections and reprints ==
=== Simon & Schuster Pogo books ===
Simon & Schuster published a long series of Pogo books beginning in 1951. S&S editor Peter Schwed writes, "The first collection of Pogo comic strips burst upon the world in 1951 as the result of [editor] Jack Goodman's insistence that there should be such a book for those who could not afford a daily newspaper, particularly since it was the only thing in the newspapers worth reading... Pogo was the comic strip of the nation and the many books that were published before Walt died each sold in the hundreds of thousands of copies."

Simon & Schuster published 33 Pogo books between 1951 and 1972, often publishing two or three books a year. In addition to strip reprints, Kelly also published books of original material, including Uncle Pogo So-So Stories, The Pogo Stepmother Goose and Songs of the Pogo.

All titles are by Walt Kelly:

- Pogo (1951)
- I Go Pogo (1952)
- Uncle Pogo So-So Stories (1953)
- The Pogo Papers (1953)
- The Pogo Stepmother Goose (1954)
- The Incompleat Pogo (1954)
- The Pogo Peek-A-Book (1955)
- Potluck Pogo (1955)
- The Pogo Sunday Book (1956)
- The Pogo Party (1956)
- Songs of the Pogo (1956)
- Pogo's Sunday Punch (1957)
- Positively Pogo (1957)
- The Pogo Sunday Parade (1958)
- G.O. Fizzickle Pogo (1958)
- Ten Ever-Lovin', Blue-Eyed Years with Pogo (1959)
- The Pogo Sunday Brunch (1959)
- Pogo Extra (Election Special) (1960)
- Beau Pogo (1960)
- Gone Pogo (1961)
- Pogo à la Sundae (1961)
- Instant Pogo (1962)
- The Jack Acid Society Black Book (1962)
- Pogo Puce Stamp Catalog (1963)
- Deck Us All with Boston Charlie (1963)
- The Return of Pogo (1965)
- The Pogo Poop Book (1966)
- Prehysterical Pogo (in Pandemonia) (1967)
- Equal Time for Pogo (1968)
- Pogo: Prisoner of Love (1969)
- Impollutable Pogo (1970)
- Pogo: We Have Met the Enemy and He Is Us (1972)
- Ten Ever Lovin' Blue Eyed Years with Pogo 1949-1959 (1972)
- Pogo Revisited (1974), a compilation of Instant Pogo, The Jack Acid Society Black Book and The Pogo Poop Book
- Pogo Re-Runs (1974), a compilation of I Go Pogo, The Pogo Party and Pogo Extra (Election Special)
- Pogo Romances Recaptured (1975), a compilation of Pogo: Prisoner of Love and The Incompleat Pogo
- Pogo's Bats and the Belles Free (1976)
- Pogo's Body Politic (1976)
- A Pogo Panorama (1977), a compilation of The Pogo Stepmother Goose, The Pogo Peek-A-Book and Uncle Pogo So-So Stories
- Pogo's Double Sundae (1978), a compilation of The Pogo Sunday Parade and The Pogo Sunday Brunch
- Pogo's Will Be That Was (1979), a compilation of G.O. Fizzickle Pogo and Positively Pogo
- The Best of Pogo (1982)
- Pogo Even Better (1984)
- Outrageously Pogo (1985)
- Pluperfect Pogo (1987)
- Phi Beta Pogo (1989)

=== Pogo books released by other publishers ===
All titles are by Walt Kelly unless otherwise noted:

- Pogo for President: Selections from I Go Pogo (Crest Books, 1964)
- The Pogo Candidature by Walt Kelly and Selby Kelly (Sheed, Andrews & McMeel, 1976)
- Ten S&S volumes were reprinted in hardcover (Gregg Press, 1977): Pogo, I Go Pogo, Uncle Pogo So-So Stories, The Pogo Papers, The Pogo Stepmother Goose, The Incompleat Pogo, The Pogo Peek-A-Book, Potluck Pogo, Gone Pogo, and Pogo à la Sundae. Bound in brown cloth, with the individual titles and an "I Go Pogo" logo stamped in gold. The dust jackets are facsimiles of the original Simon & Schuster covers, with an image of Walt Kelly reproduced on the back.
- The Walt Kelly Collector's Guide by Steve Thompson (Spring Hollow Books, 1988)
- The Complete Pogo Comics: Pogo & Albert (Eclipse Comics, 1989–1990) 4 volumes (reprints of pre-strip comic book stories, unfinished)
- Pogo Files for Pogophiles by Selby Daly Kelly and Steve Thompson, eds. (Spring Hollow Books, 1992)
- Ten more S&S volumes reprinted in hardcover (Jonas/Winter Inc., 1995): The Pogo Sunday Book, Pogo's Sunday Punch, Beau Pogo, Pogo Puce Stamp Catalog, Deck Us All with Boston Charlie, The Return of Pogo, Prehysterical Pogo (in Pandemonia), Equal Time for Pogo, Impollutable Pogo, and Pogo: We Have Met the Enemy and He Is Us. Bound in navy blue cloth, with the individual titles and a "Pogo Collectors Edition" logo stamped in gold. Issued without dust jackets.
- Pogo (Fantagraphics Books, 1994–2000) 11 volumes (reprints first 5½ years of daily strips)
- The Pogopedia by Nik Lauer, et al. (Spring Hollow Books, 2001)
- We Go Pogo: Walt Kelly, Politics, and American Satire by Kerry D. Soper (University Press of Mississippi, 2012)
- Much Ado: The POGOfenokee Trivia Book, Mark Burstein, Eclipse Books, 1988, ISBN 1-56060-025-X.
- Walt Kelly's Pogo: The Complete Dell Comics (Hermes Press, 2013–2018) 6 volumes (reprints of pre-strip comic book stories)

==== Pogo: The Complete Syndicated Comic Strips ====
In February 2007, Fantagraphics Books announced the publication of a projected 12-volume hardcover series collecting the complete chronological run of daily and full-color Sunday syndicated Pogo strips. The series began in 2011 under the title Pogo: The Complete Syndicated Comic Strips. As of 2024, eight volumes – each covering two calendar years – have been published, with the next scheduled for 2027.
