= Ramba =

Ramba may refer to:

- Ramba (comics), a 1992–1994 Italian erotic comics series
- Ramba Township, Tibet Autonomous Region, China
- Ramba Ral, a character in the anime series Mobile Suit Gundam
- Ramba (actress) (born 1967), Italian pornographic actress
- Tereza Ramba (born 1989), Czech actress

== See also ==
- Rambha (disambiguation)
