= Rambha Urvasi Menaka =

2026 Indian film by Chandra Mohan

- Theatrical release poster
- Directed by: Chandra Mohan Chintada
- Written by: Chandra Mohan Chintada; Nandu Savirigana
- Produced by: Razesh Danda; Prasad Nimmakayala
- Starring: Allari Naresh; Surbhi; Naresh
- Cinematography: Raam Reddy
- Edited by: Chota K. Prasad
- Music by: Chaitan Bharadwaj
- Production company: Hasya Movies
- Distributed by: Annapurna Studios; Shloka Entertainments
- Release date: 4 September 2026
- Running time: 144 minutes
- Country: India
- Language: Telugu
- Budget: 5.25cr
- Box office: 15.75cr

Rambha Urvasi Menaka is a 2026 Indian Telugu language socio-fantasy comedy directed by Chandra Mohan Chintada and produced by Razesh Danda and Prasad Nimmakayala, under Hasya Movies. It stars Allari Naresh, Surbhi, Naresh, Rashi Singh, and Vishnupriya Bhimeneni in the primary roles. The music for the film was composed by Chaitan Bharadwaj and edited by Chota K. Prasad.

The film was theatrically released on 4 September 2026 to mixed reviews.

== Plot ==
Suri spends 15 years trying to summon celestial angels to earth. He finds a way to descent Rambha, Urvasi, Menaka but due to Lord Indra's curse, they lose their divine powers. Eventually Suri mother fells ill and he is dire need of money, But he realizes that hard work only can help people. Starts his own drama troupe and gain fame at the end.

== Cast ==
- Allari Naresh as Suri Babu
- Surbhi as Chinni
- Naresh as CEO
- Vennela Kishore as Indra
- Srinivasa Reddy as Parimala
- Rashi Singh as Rambha
- Vishnupriya Bhimeneni as Urvasi
- Prisha Singh as Menaka
- Ajay as Yama
- Tarak Ponnappa as Appala Naidu
- Ravi Siva Teja as Constable
- Hari Teja as Shachi Devi

== Production ==
The film was produced by Hasya Movies.

== Release ==
=== Theatrical ===
The film was released on 4 September 2026.

=== Home media ===
The digital streaming rights of this film were brought by Amazon Prime Video. The film began streaming on Amazon Prime Video from 25 September 2026.

== Reception ==
Timesnownews rated this film with 3/5. AP7AM rated this film with 2/5.
