= Pogo: The Complete Syndicated Comic Strips =

Publication information
- Publisher: Fantagraphics Books
- Schedule: Irregular
- Format: Hardcover
- Genre: Humour; Satire; Political commentary Anthropomorphic animals
- Publication date: December 5, 2011
- No. of issues: Eight published of twelve planned
- Main character(s): Pogo Possum, Albert Alligator, Porky Pine, Churchy LaFemme, Beauregard Bugleboy, Miz Hepzibah, Seminole Sam, Howland Owl

Creative team
- Written by: Walt Kelly
- Artist: Walt Kelly
- Editor(s): Carolyn Kelly, Kim Thompson, Mark Evanier, Eric Reynolds

Pogo: The Complete Syndicated Comic Strips is a series of books published by Fantagraphics Books collecting the complete run of the Pogo comic strips, a daily and a Sunday strip written and drawn by Walt Kelly, for the first time. Debuting in 1948 in the short-lived New York Star newspaper, during the strip's golden days in the mid-1950s it had an estimated readership of 37 million, appearing in 450 newspapers. The first volume of this reprint series was released in December 2011.

== History ==
Up until Fantagraphics began publishing this hardcover collection, the only somewhat complete trade paperback series, released by Simon & Schuster from 1951 to 1973, had been the most comprehensive collection of the comic strip, "somewhat complete" meaning missing sequences, dropped panels, abridged plot lines and sometimes unsupplemented new drawings. Fantagraphics had during the 1990s published an incomplete collection in an eleven-volume softcover series, covering five and a half years of the strip's run.

On February 15, 2007, Fantagraphics Books announced that it had obtained the rights to publish a complete edition of Pogo, with a projected 12 volume comprehensive hardcover collection scheduled to be launched in October 2007, with books to be released on a rough annual basis. In May 2007, Gary Groth of Fantagraphics Books reached out to comic collectors of all sorts in order to help Fantagraphics obtain the best source materials possible. In July 2008, one of the series' editors, Eric Reynolds, stated that he and Fantagraphics had been having a hard time securing good enough source material to reproduce the first couple of years of the comic strip.

By January 2011, it had become a running gag in comic circles online for someone to be "still waiting on Pogo". The first volume of the series was sent to the printers in August 2011, and in December, it was finally released. One year later, the second volume followed.

Kim Thompson, co-publisher of Fantagraphics, died of lung cancer on June 19, 2013. In the aftermath of his death, Fantagraphics faced economic difficulties due, in part, to a major loss of sales that fiscal year, due to the postponing of 13 upcoming titles which he had been in charge of editing, nearly a third of the company's scheduled total output that year. To keep the company afloat after all this turmoil, Fantagraphics launched a Kickstarter campaign on November 5, 2013; the goal of raising $150,000 was reached in about a week. However, the publication schedule suffered from Thompson's passing, and the third volume was released in November 2014. It was dedicated to Thompson, "a good friend of Pogo".

On April 9, 2017, Carolyn Kelly, co-editor of the series and daughter of Walt Kelly, died after a long battle against breast cancer and its complications. She had been responsible for painting the covers in the beginning of the series (volume 1-4), designing the books, restoring source material where it was needed and supervising the whole reprint project of her father's work. Mark Evanier, another of the series' editors, stated that by the time of her death, the work of their Pogo series had reached the point where no major restoration was required since they had come to the series' middle years, and source material was no longer scarce nor in horrible shape.

== Contents ==
Each volume is approximately 340 pages long and contains two years worth of chronological daily comic strips reproduced in black-and-white (just as the original newspaper printings were), as well as the entire sequence of color Sunday strips originally published during that same period. The daily one-row strips are arranged three per page and separated from the standalone full page Sunday strips.

The books include extras such as prefaces by Jimmy Breslin and Stan Freberg, among others; weekly plot summaries of the strips; indexes for the comic strips; annotations by comics historian R.C. Harvey; samples of Walt Kelly's original art; and a biography of Walt Kelly, written by Steve Thompson.

== Volumes and box sets ==
The volumes are available individually and in slipcase sets of two.

Volumes
Volume	Release date	Title	Period	Foreword by	Page count	ISBN
1	December 5, 2011	Through the Wild Blue Wonder	1948–1950	Jimmy Breslin	320	978-1-56097-869-5
2	December 18, 2012	Bona Fide Balderdash	1951–1952	Stan Freberg	344	978-1-60699-584-6
3	November 11, 2014	Evidence to the Contrary	1953–1954	Mike Peters	344	978-1-60699-694-2
4	January 30, 2018	Under the Bamboozle Bush	1955–1956	Neil Gaiman	344	978-1-60699-863-2
5	October 23, 2018	Out of This World at Home	1957–1958	Jake Tapper	344	978-1-68396-133-8
6	January 14, 2020	Clean as a Weasel	1959–1960	Jim Davis	344	978-1-68396-243-4
7	November 10, 2020	Pockets Full of Pie	1961–1962	Sergio Aragonés	360	978-1-68396-376-9
8	December 13, 2022	Hijinks from the Horn of Plenty	1963–1964	Lucy Shelton Caswell	344	978-1-68396-471-1
9	August 24, 2027	A Distant Past Yet to Come	1965–1966		344	978-1-68396-965-5

=== Box sets ===
Box sets
Volume	Release date	Title	Period	ISBN
1	December 18, 2012	Pogo: The Complete Syndicated Comic Strips Vols. 1 & 2	1948–1952	978-1-60699-629-4
2	March 31, 2018	Pogo: The Complete Syndicated Comic Strips Vols. 3 & 4	1953–1956	978-1-60699-864-9
3	January 14, 2020	Pogo: The Complete Syndicated Comic Strips Vols. 5 & 6	1957–1960	978-1-68396-244-1
4	December 13, 2022	Pogo: The Complete Syndicated Comic Strips Vols. 7 & 8	1961–1964	978-1-68396-491-9

== Recognition ==
- 2013
  - The second volume of the series won the Eisner Award in the category "Best Archival Collection/Project—Strips".
  - It was also nominated for the Harvey Award in the category "Best Domestic Reprint Project".
- 2015
  - The third volume was nominated for the Eisner Award in the category "Best Archival Collection/Project—Strips".
- 2019
  - The fifth volume was nominated for the Eisner Award in the category "Best Archival Collection/Project—Strips".
- 2020
  - Volume six was nominated for the Eisner Award in the category "Best Archival Collection/Project—Strips".
- 2021
  - Volume seven was nominated for the Eisner Award in the category "Best Archival Collection/Project—Strips".
