= Fantagraphics =

American comics publisher

- Founded: 1976
- Founder: Gary Groth; Michael Catron
- Country of origin: United States
- Headquarters location: Seattle, Washington 47.549167°N 122.316885°W
- Distribution: W. W. Norton & Company (United States); Diamond Book Distributors (Canada); Turnaround Publisher Services (United Kingdom)
- Key people: Gary Groth; Kim Thompson; Eric Reynolds
- Publication types: Books, comic books, magazines
- Imprints: Eros Comix; Ignatz Series; Redbeard Inc.
- Official website: fantagraphics.com

Fantagraphics (previously Fantagraphics Books) is an American publisher of alternative comics, classic comic strip anthologies, manga, magazines, graphic novels, and (formerly) the erotic Eros Comix imprint. They have managed several awards for achievement in comic books.

== History ==
=== Founding ===
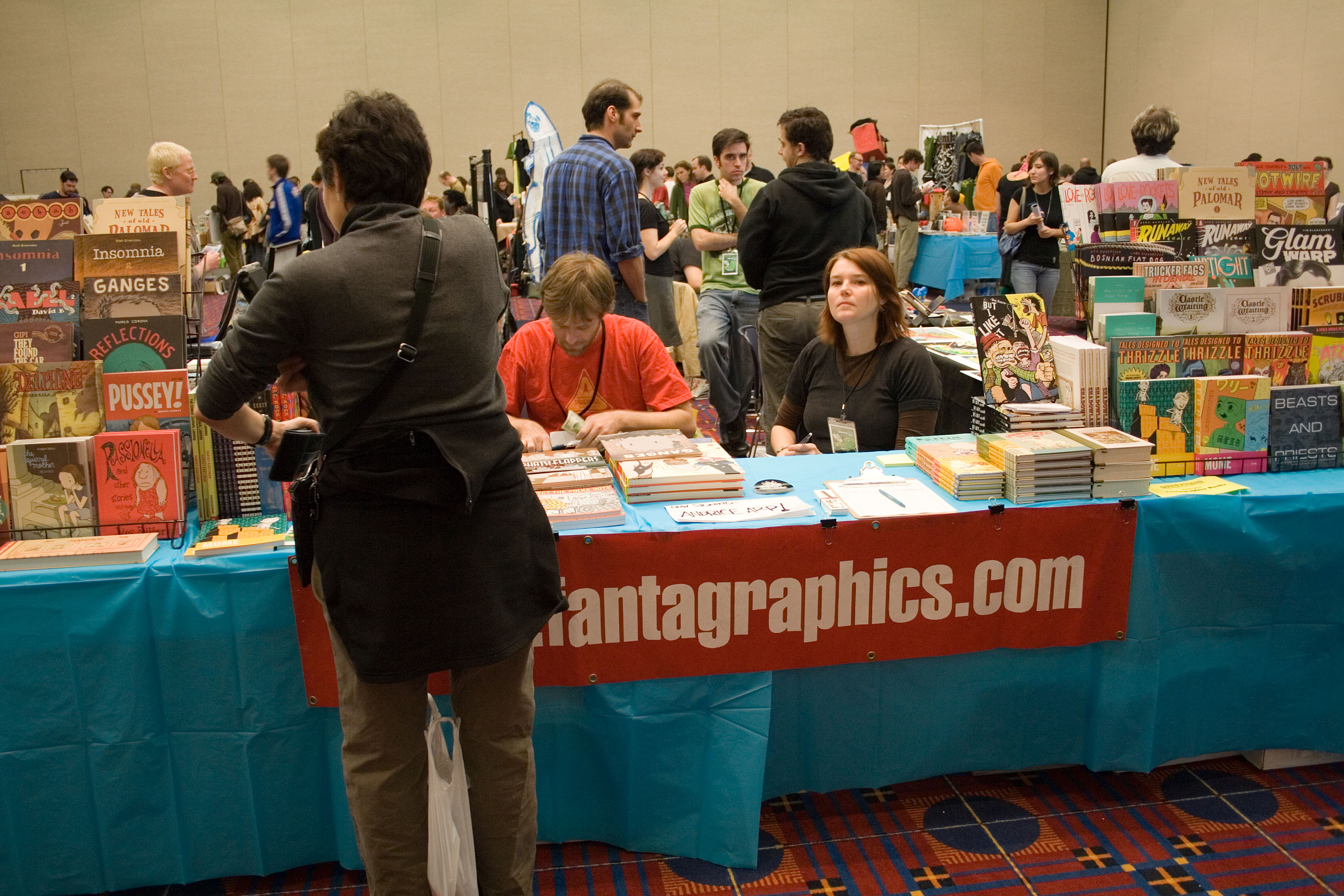
The Fantagraphics booth at the Stumptown Comics Fest 2006

Fantagraphics was founded in 1976 by Gary Groth and Michael Catron in College Park, Maryland. The company took over an adzine named The Nostalgia Journal, which it renamed The Comics Journal, transforming it from an adzine into a magazine of news and criticism that just happened to carry advertisements.

Kim Thompson joined the company in 1977, using his inheritance to keep the company afloat. He soon became a co-owner.

The company moved from Washington, D.C., to Stamford, Connecticut, to Los Angeles over its early years, before settling in Seattle in 1989.

Beginning in 1981 Fantagraphics (under its Redbeard Inc. imprint) published Amazing Heroes, a magazine which examined comics from a hobbyist's point of view, as another income stream to supplement The Comics Journal. Amazing Heroes ran for 204 issues (plus a number of specials and annuals), folding with its July 1992 issue.

=== Comics publisher ===
Beginning in 1979, Fantagraphics began publishing comics, starting with Jay Disbrow's The Flames of Gyro. They gained wider recognition in 1982 by publishing the Hernández brothers' Love and Rockets, and moved on to such critically acclaimed and award-winning series as Acme Novelty Library, Eightball, and Hate.

The company moved operations to Greater Los Angeles in 1984.

Catron acted as Fantagraphics' co-publisher until 1985 (also handling advertising and circulation for The Comics Journal from 1982 to 1985), when he left the company.

=== The Kirby Awards and the Harvey Awards ===
From 1985 to 1987, Fantagraphics coordinated and presented (through their magazine Amazing Heroes) The Jack Kirby Award for achievement in comic books, voted on by comic-book professionals. The Kirby Award was managed by Dave Olbrich, a Fantagraphics employee (and later publisher of Malibu Comics). In 1987, a dispute arose when Olbrich and Fantagraphics each claimed ownership of the awards. A compromise was reached, and, starting in 1988, the Kirby Award was discontinued and two new awards were created: the Eisner Awards, managed by Olbrich; and the Fantagraphics-managed Harvey Awards, named for cartoonist Harvey Kurtzman.

=== Relocation to Seattle ===
In 1989, Fantagraphics relocated from Los Angeles to its current location in the Maple Leaf neighborhood of Seattle, Washington.

In 1990, the publisher introduced Eros Comix, a lucrative line of erotic comics that provided a replacement revenue stream for Amazing Heroes and which helped the company again avoid bankruptcy.

Longtime employee Eric Reynolds joined Fantagraphics in 1993, first as news editor for The Comics Journal from 1993, before moving to marketing and promotion in 1996. Groth and Thompson acknowledged Reynolds was key to the company's rise to profitability.

Tom Spurgeon, later known as the publisher of The Comics Reporter, was editor of The Comics Journal from 1994 to 1999.

=== Financial ups and downs ===
In 1998, Fantagraphics was forced into a round of layoffs; and in 2003 the company almost went out of business, losing over $60,000 in the wake of the 2002 bankruptcy of debtor and book trade distributor Seven Hills Distribution. One employee quit during the subsequent downsizing while denouncing Fantagraphics' "disorganization and poor management." As journalist (and former Fantagraphics employee) Michael Dean wrote, "the publisher has alternated between flourishing and nearly perishing over the years."

Fantagraphics was saved by a restructuring and a successful appeal to comic book fandom that resulted in a huge number of orders. After restructuring, the company has had greater success with such hardcover collections as The Complete Peanuts, distributed by W. W. Norton & Company.

In 2009, Fantagraphics ceased publishing the print edition of The Comics Journal, shifting from an eight-times a year publishing schedule to a larger, more elaborate, semi-annual format supported by a new website.

=== European line ===
Starting in 2005, Fantagraphics began a European graphic novel line, starting with the co-publication of the Ignatz Series, edited and produced by the Italian artist Igort. The publisher announced a deal with Jacques Tardi in March 2009 that would see co-publisher Thompson translate a large number of his books.

=== New challenges ===
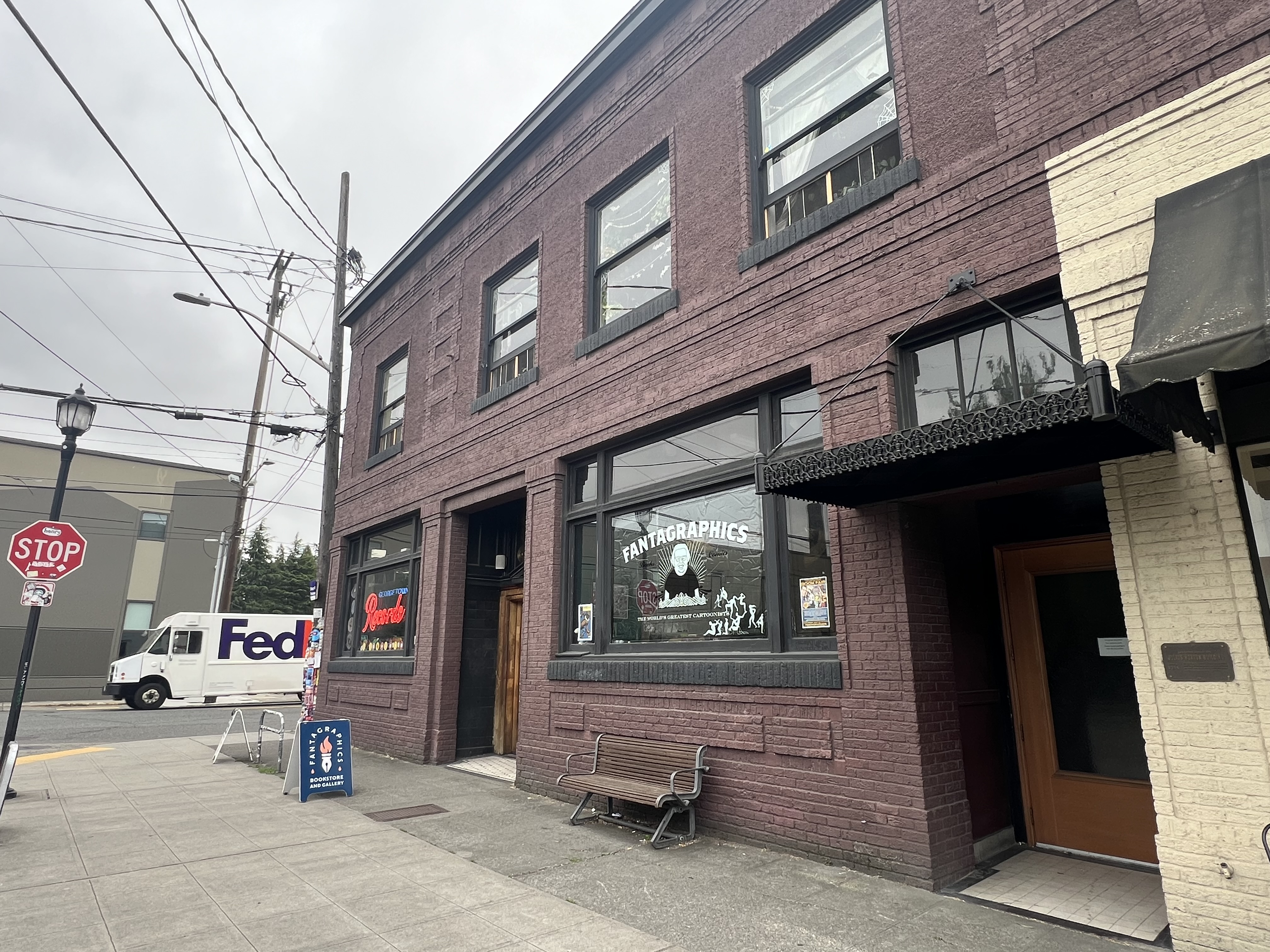
Storefront for a brick and mortar location in 2024

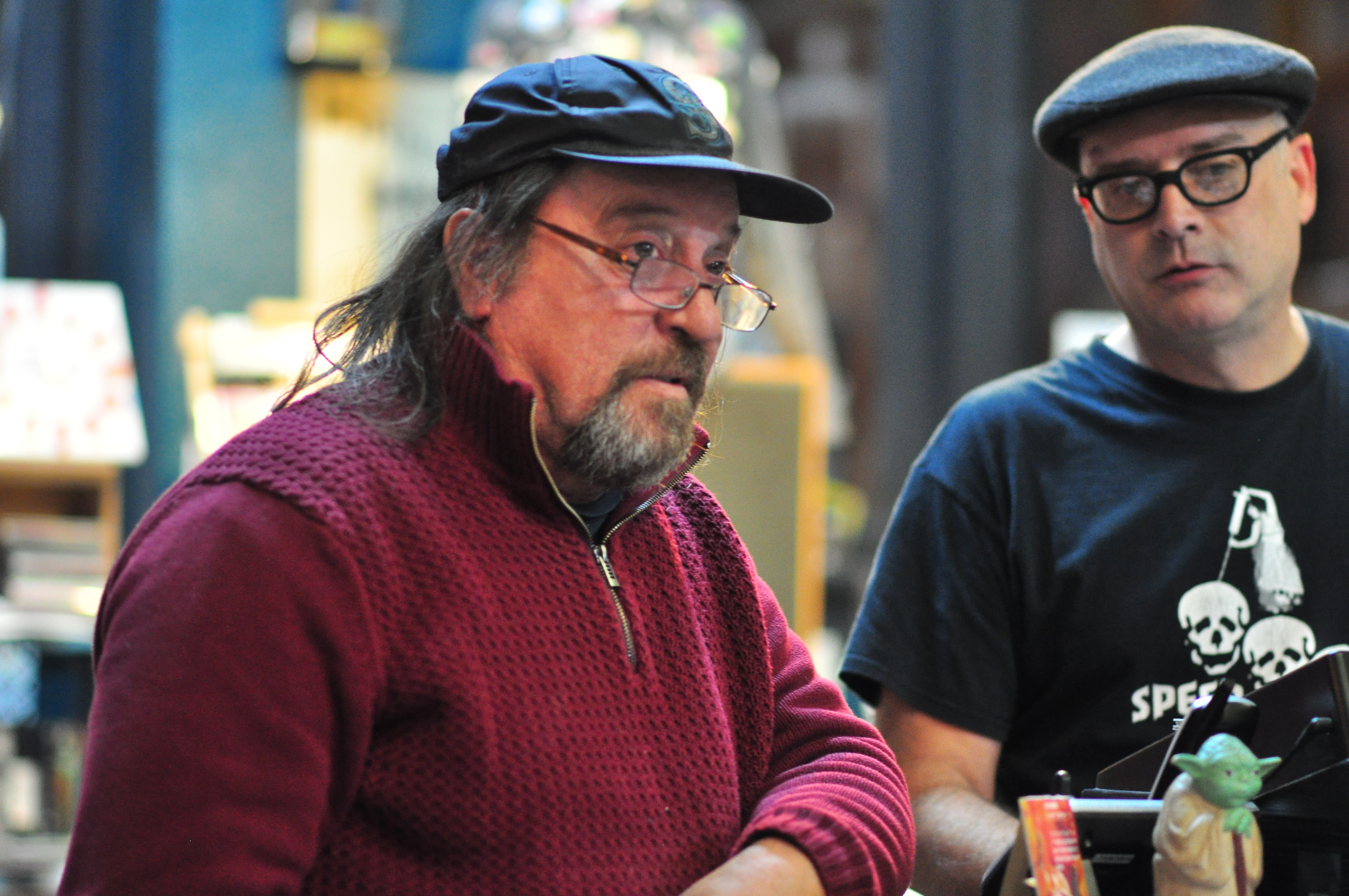
Larry Reid (left), manager and curator of the Fantagraphics Bookstore and Gallery with Martin Imbach (right), part owner of Georgetown Records, which shares the same storefront, in 2016

In 2006, Fantagraphics opened its own retail store, Fantagraphics Bookstore & Gallery, in Seattle's Georgetown neighborhood.

In 2009, Jacq Cohen started as the publicist for Fantagraphics.

Co-publisher Kim Thompson left Fantagraphics due to illness in March 2013, and died of lung cancer a few months later. His absence left the company without a number of titles it had been counting on for the summer and fall of 2013; and, in November, Fantagraphics started a Kickstarter campaign to raise $150,000, which it surpassed in four days.

In August 2020, the company rebranded from Fantagraphics Books to just Fantagraphics. At the same time it introduced a more compact logo featuring a stylized ink pen nib and a torch.

In 2023, Fantagraphics began reprinting comics from Atlas Comics under license from Marvel Comics. To date, they have released eight volumes devoted to series and three devoted to creators. In April 2025 they began a series of hardcovers called "Lost Marvels." The first volume, released in April, collects Tower of Shadows. The second, scheduled for August, focuses on Howard Chaykin and includes Dominic Fortune, Monark Starstalker, and Phantom Eagle. The third, scheduled for November, reprints Savage Tales (vol. 2).

== Imprints ==
=== Ignatz Series ===
The Ignatz Series is an international comic imprint. It is published by Fantagraphics (U.S.), Avant Verlag (Germany), Vertige Graphic (France), Oog & Blik (Holland), Coconino Press (Italy), and Sinsentido (Spain). It is named for Ignatz Mouse, a character in the comic strip Krazy Kat.

The books in the Ignatz Series are designed midway between standard North American comic book pamphlet-size and graphic novel-size. Each title is 32 pages, two-color, saddle stitched, 8 1/2″ × 11″, with jacket, priced at $7.95.

The Ignatz collection is edited and produced by Italian artist Igort. Fantagraphics editor Kim Thompson frequently provided translations.

=== Eros Comix ===
Eros Comix was an adult-oriented imprint of Fantagraphics. It was established in 1990 to publish pornographic comic books like Gilbert Hernández' Birdland and reprints of work by Wally Wood and Frank Thorne. Eventually, Eros added to its catalogue dozens of comics titles, over 40 collected editions, anime videos, DVDs, and books of erotic art and photography. The 2006 Eros Comix print catalog sold over 470 items, including adult comic books and humorous cheesecake-style comics often featuring pin-up girls like Bettie Page. The Eros Comix imprint was popular enough that it is credited with making Fantagraphics financially solvent.

Notable Eros titles include Bill Willingham's Ironwood, SS Crompton's Demi the Demoness, Howard Chaykin's Black Kiss, Domino Lady; and the Italian series Djustine, Ramba, and Adult Frankenstein.

Writer-artist Tom Sutton contributed work to Eros titles under the pseudonym "Dementia". Other contributors to Eros titles included Eric Stanton, Mary Fleener, Mikael Oskarsson, Bill Pearson, Malachy Coney, Richard Bassford, Gary Dumm, Frank Stack, Bob Fingerman, Molly Kiely, Yanick Paquette, Robert Peters, John Workman, Colleen Coover, Marc Andreyko, Raulo Cáceres, Larry Fuller, Dennis Eichhorn, Dennis Cramer/Justine Mara Andersen, Jon Macy, John Blackburn, and Greg Budgett.

Eros' MangErotica line featured translated hentai manga by the likes of Isutoshi, Oh! great, Toshiki Yui, Teruo Kakuta, and Benkyo Tamaoki; and titles like Bondage Fairies, Hatsuinu, Hot Tails, A Strange Kind of Woman, Slut Girl, and Super Taboo.

In the beginning, there was some controversy over Eros titles featuring back cover ads with phone sex numbers. In 1994, Eros editor Tom Verre was replaced by Jeremy Pinkham.

By the late 1990s, the imprint was no longer profitable; the publication of new material from the company diminished rapidly. The Eros Comix website was no longer being maintained by 2017; its titles no longer appear on the Fantagraphics website under that label.

== Titles ==
=== Comics anthology magazines ===
- Anything Goes!
- BLAB!
- Blood Orange
- Critters
- Ganzfeld
- Graphic Story Monthly
- Hotwire Comix and Capers
- MOME
- NOW
- Pictopia
- Prime Cuts
- Snake Eyes
- Zero Zero

=== Magazines ===
- Amazing Heroes (1981–1992) – a defunct publication devoted mostly to mainstream comics
- The Comics Journal (1977–present) – magazine of comics news and criticism
- Honk (1986–1987) – magazine of comics news and criticism
- Nemo, the Classic Comics Library (1983–1990) – a defunct magazine devoted to classic comics

=== Comic book series ===
- Acme Novelty Library
- Artbabe
- The Adventures of Captain Jack
- Angry Youth Comix
- Big Mouth
- The Biologic Show
- Black Hole
- Castle Waiting
- Crap
- Cud
- Dalgoda
- Doofus
- Duplex Planet Illustrated
- Eightball
- The Eye of Mongombo
- Evil Eye
- Fission Chicken
- Frank
- Ganges
- Good Girls
- Grit Bath
- Hate
- Hip Hop Family Tree Vol. 1-4 by Ed Piskor
- Jim
- Jizz
- Journey
- La Perdida
- Love and Rockets
- Meatcake
- Mechanics (Three-issue miniseries)
- Megahex
- Naughty Bits
- Neat Stuff
- The Nimrod
- Raisin Pie
- Real Stuff
- Schizo
- Shadowland
- Stinz
- The Stuff of Dreams
- Unsupervised Existence
- Uptight
- Usagi Yojimbo (up to volume 7)
- Tales Designed to Thrizzle
- Wandering Son
- Weasel
- Whot Not!
- Wuvable Oaf

=== # series ===
0: Babel #1 by David B. [France]

1. Baobab #1 by Igort [Italy]
2. Insomnia #1 by Matt Broersma [U.K./U.S.A.]
3. Wish You Were Here #1: The Innocents by Gipi [Italy]
4. Interiorae #1 by Gabriella Giandelli [Italy]
5. Ganges #1 by Kevin Huizenga [U.S.A.]
6. Chimera #1 by Lorenzo Mattotti [Italy]
7. Insomnia #2 by Matt Broersma [U.K./U.S.A.]
8. Babel #2 by David B. [France]
9. Wish You Were Here #2: They Found the Car by Gipi [Italy]
10. Reflections #1 by Marco Corona [Italy]
11. Baobab #2 by Igort [Italy]
12. Niger #1 by Leila Marzocchi [Italy]
13. Delphine #1 by Richard Sala [U.S.]
14. New Tales of Old Palomar #1 by Gilbert Hernández [U.S.]
15. Interiorae #2 by Gabriella Giandelli [Italy]
16. Calvario Hills #1 by Marti [Spain]
17. The End #1 by Anders Nilsen [U.S.]
18. Reflections #2 by Marco Corona [Italy]
19. New Tales of Old Palomar #2 by Gilbert Hernández [U.S.]
20. Delphine #2 by Richard Sala [U.S.]
21. Sammy the Mouse #1 by Zak Sally [U.S.]
22. Grotesque #1 by Sergio Ponchione [Italy]
23. Niger #2 by Leila Marzocchi [Italy]
24. Reflections #3 by Marco Corona [Italy]
25. Insomnia #3 by Matt Broersma [U.K./U.S.A.]
26. New Tales of Old Palomar #3 by Gilbert Hernández [U.S.]
27. Ganges #2 by Kevin Huizenga [U.S.]
28. Baobab #3 by Igort [Italy]
29. Delphine #3 by Richard Sala [U.S.]
30. Grotesque #2 by Sergio Ponchione [Italy]
31. Interiorae #3 by Gabriella Giandelli [Italy]
32. Sammy the Mouse #2 by Zak Sally [U.S.]
33. Grotesque #3 by Sergio Ponchione [Italy]
34. Delphine #4 by Richard Sala [U.S.]
35. Ganges #3 by Kevin Huizenga [U.S.]
36. Niger #3 by Leila Marzocchi [Italy]
37. Grotesque #4 by Sergio Ponchione [Italy]
38. Interiorae #4 by Gabriella Giandelli [Italy]
39. Sammy the Mouse #3 by Zak Sally [U.S.]
40. Ganges #4 by Kevin Huizenga [U.S.]

To be released

1. XX: Babel #3 by David B.
2. XX: Baobab #4 by Igort [Italy]
3. XX: Calvario Hills #2 by Marti
4. XX: The End #2 by Anders Nilsen
5. XX: Wish You Were Here #3 by Gipi [Italy]

=== Graphic novels ===
- King by Ho Che Anderson
- Pixy by Max Andersson
- Ghost World by Dan Clowes
- Caricature by Dan Clowes
- Like a Velvet Glove Cast in Iron by Dan Clowes
- Patience by Dan Clowes
- Beasts by Jacob Covey
- My Favorite Thing Is Monsters by Emil Ferris
- Drawn to Berlin by Ali Fitzgerald
- The Wipeout by Francesca Ghermandi
- Black is the Color by Julia Gfrörer
- Laid Waste by Julia Gfrörer
- Amsterdam by Simon Hanselmann
- Megahex by Simon Hanselmann
- One More Year by Simon Hanselmann
- Palomar by Gilbert Hernández
- Locas by Jaime Hernández
- I Killed Adolf Hitler by Jason
- The Lie and How We Told It by Tommi Parrish
- Anywhere But Here by Miki Tori
- Palestine by Joe Sacco
- Safe Area Goražde by Joe Sacco
- Harum Scarum by Lewis Trondheim
- The Hoodoodad by Lewis Trondheim
- Alphabetical Ballad of Carnality by David Sandlin
- Weathercraft, Congress of the Animals, and Fran by Jim Woodring
- Frederick and Eloise: A Love Story by Brian Biggs

=== Classic comics compilations ===
Disney comics

- The Complete Carl Barks Disney Library
- Disney Masters
- The Don Rosa Library
- Walt Disney's Mickey Mouse
- Walt Disney's Uncle Scrooge & Donald Duck: Bear Mountain Tales
- Walt Disney's Silly Symphonies

Other titles

- Barnaby
- Buz Sawyer
- Captain Easy
- The Complete Crumb Comics
- Dennis the Menace
- The EC Artists' Library
- Feiffer: The Collected Works
- Humbug
- Krazy Kat
- Little Nemo
- Little Orphan Annie
- Nancy
- The Complete Peanuts
- Pogo: The Complete Syndicated Comic Strips
- Poor Arnold's Almanac
- The Complete E. C. Segar Popeye
- Powerhouse Pepper
- Prince Valiant
- Sam's Strip

=== Books ===
- Black Images in the Comics: A Visual History by Fredrik Strömberg
- Blacklight: The World of L.B. Cole by Bill Schelly
- Film Noir 101: The 101 Best Film Noir Posters from the 1940s & 1950s by Mark Fertig
- Laura Warholic by Alexander Theroux, 2007
- Massive: Gay Erotic Manga and the Men Who Make It edited by Anne Ishii, Chip Kidd, and Graham Kolbeins
- No Straight Lines edited by Justin Hall
- Significant Objects edited by Joshua Glenn and Rob Walker
- Tales of Terror! The EC Companion by Grant Geissman and Fred von Bernewitz
- Take That, Adolf! The Fighting Comic Books of the Second World War by Mark Fertig

=== Eros Comix titles ===
- Adult Frankenstein by Enrico Teodorani
- Aunts in your Pants by Enrico Teodorani
- Birdland by Gilbert Hernández
- Elizabeth Bathory by Raulo Cáceres
- Ironwood by Bill Willingham
- Karate Girl
- Omaha the Cat Dancer by Kate Worley (story) and Reed Waller (art)
- Ramba by Rossi, Delizia, and Laurenti, whose protagonist is an erotic Italian hitlady
- Small Favors by Colleen Coover
- Sticky by Dale Lazarov and Steve MacIsaac
- Submit! by Silvano & Enrico Teodorani
- Tales from the Clit by Enrico Teodorani
- Tijuana Bibles
- Untamed Love by Frank Frazetta
- Vladrushka and Rosa & Annalisa by JLRoberson
- Wendy Whitebread by Don Simpson
- Wheela, Biker Bitch of the Apocalypse by Enrico Teodorani

==== MangErotica titles ====
- Bondage Fairies (1996)
- Hot Tails (1996)
- Spunky Knight (1996)
- Super Taboo (1996)
- Secret Plot (1997)
- Countdown: Sex Bomb (1997)
- Misty Girl Extreme (1997)
- Secret Plot Deep (1998)
- Silky Whip by Oh! great (1998)
- New Bondage Fairies: Fairie Fetish (1998)
- Co-ed Sexxtacy (1999)
- Slut Girl (2000)
- Pink Sniper by Kengo Yonekura (2006)
- Domin-8 Me! by Sesshu Takemura (2007, original title: Take On Me)
- Milk Mama by Yukiyanagi (2008)
- Love Selection by Gunma Kisaragi (2010)
- Too Hot to Handle by Jogi Tsukino (2010, original title: ♭37 °C)
- Love & Hate by Enomoto Heights (2011)
- A Strange Kind of Woman by Inu (2011)

== Recognition ==
=== Kirby Awards ===
1986

- Best Black-and-White Comic: Love and Rockets, by Jaime Hernández and Gilbert Hernández

Note: In 1988, the Kirby Awards was disbanded and replaced by the Harvey and the Eisner Awards.

=== Eisner Awards ===
List of won Eisner Awards:

1994

- Best Archival Collection: Complete Little Nemo in Slumberland Vol. 6
  by Winsor McCay

1995

- Best Publication Design: The Acme Novelty Library, designed by Chris Ware

1996

- Best Continuing Series: Acme Novelty Library, by Chris Ware
- Best Archival Collection: The Complete Crumb Comics Vol. 11, by Robert Crumb
- Best Coloring: Chris Ware - The Acme Novelty Library
- Best Comics-Related Publication - Periodical: The Comics Journal
- Best Publication Design: The Acme Novelty Library by Chris Ware

1997

- Best Comics-Related Periodical: The Comics Journal
- Best Publication Design: Acme Novelty Library Vol. 7

1998

- Best Coloring: Chris Ware, The Acme Novelty Library
- Best Comics-Related Periodical: The Comics Journal
- Best Comics-Related Product: Acme Novelty Library display stand, designed by Chris Ware

1999

- Best Comics-Related Periodical: The Comics Journal

2000

- Best Continuing Series: Acme Novelty Library by Chris Ware
- Best Graphic Album - New: Acme Novelty Library Vol. 13, by Chris Ware
- Best Writer/Artist: Dan Clowes, Eightball

2001

- Best Writer/Artist - Humor: Tony Millionaire, Maakies
- Best Coloring: Chris Ware, Acme Novelty Library #14

2002

- Best Single Issue: Eightball #22, by Dan Clowes
- Best Writer/Artist: Dan Clowes, Eightball
- Best Publication Design: Acme Novelty Library #15, designed by Chris Ware

2003

- Best Single Issue or One-Shot: The Stuff of Dreams by Kim Deitch
- Best Archival Collection/Project: Krazy & Ignatz by George Herriman
- Best Writer/Artist- Humor: Tony Millionaire, The House at Maakies Corner
- Best Comics-Related Publication (Periodical or Book): B. Krigstein Vol. 1, by Greg Sadowski

2004

- Best Archival Collection/Project: Krazy & Ignatz: 1929–1930, by George Herriman, edited by Bill Blackbeard

2005

- Best Single Issue or One-Shot: Eightball #23: "The Death Ray", by Dan Clowes
- Best Archival Collection/Project: The Complete Peanuts edited by Gary Groth
- Best Publication Design: The Complete Peanuts, designed by Seth

2007

- Best Archival Collection/Project—Strips: The Complete Peanuts
  1959–1960, 1961–1962, by Charles Schulz
- Best U.S. Edition of International Material: The Left Bank Gang by Jason
- Best Writer/Artist-Humor: Tony Millionaire, Billy Hazelnuts

2008

- Best Archival Collection/Project - Comic Books: I Shall Destroy All the Civilized Planets!, by Fletcher Hanks
- Best U.S. Edition of International Material: I Killed Adolf Hitler by Jason

2009

- Best U.S. Edition of International Material:The Last Musketeer by Jason

2011

- Best Reality-Based Work: It Was the War of the Trenches by Jacques Tardi
- Best U.S. Edition of International Material: It Was the War of the Trenches by Jacques Tardi

2012

- Best Archival Collection/Project-Comic Strips: Walt Disney's Mickey Mouse Vols. 1-2,
  by Floyd Gottfredson, edited by David Gerstein and Gary Groth

2013

- Best Short Story: Moon1969: The True Story of the 1969 Moon Launch,
  by Michael Kupperman, in Tales Designed to Thrizzle #8
- Best Archival Collection/Project-Strips: Pogo Vol. 2: Bona Fide Balderdash,
  by Walt Kelly, edited by Carolyn Kelly and Kim Thompson

2014

- Best Short Story: Untitled by Gilbert Hernández, in Love and Rockets: New Stories #6
- Best U.S. Edition of International Material: Goddam This War!,
  by Jacques Tardi and Jean-Pierre Verney
- Best Writer/Artist: Jamie Hernández, Love and Rockets: New Stories #6

2015

- Best Reality-Based Work: Hip Hop Family Tree Vol. 2 by Ed Piskor

2016

- Best Archival Collection/Project - Strips: The Eternaut,
  by Héctor Germán Oesterheld and Francisco Solano López, edited by Gary Groth and Kristy Valenti
- Best Writer/Artist: Bill Griffith, Invisible Ink: My Mother's Secret Love Affair with a Famous Cartoonist

2017

- Best Archival Collection/Project - Comic Books (at least 20 years old): The Complete Wimmen's Comix,
  edited by Trina Robbins, Gary Groth and J. Michael Catron

2018

- Best Graphic Album- New: My Favorite Thing Is Monsters by Emil Ferris
- Best U.S. Edition of International Material: Run for It: Stories of Slaves Who Fought for the Freedom,
  by Marcelo D'Salete, translated by Andrea Rosenberg
- Best Writer/Artist: Emil Ferris, My Favorite Thing Is Monsters
- Best Coloring: Emil Ferris My Favorite Thing Is Monsters
- Best Comics-Related Periodical/Journalism: The Comics Journal,
  edited by Dan Nadel, Timothy Hodler and Tucker Stone, www.tcj.com
- Best Comics-Related Book: How to Read Nancy: The Elements of Comics in Three Easy Panels,
  by Paul Karasik and Mark Newgarden

2020

- Best Single Issue/One-Shot: Our Favorite Thing is My Favorite Thing Is Monsters by Emil Ferris
- Best U.S. Edition of International Material: The House by Paco Roca

2021

- Best Graphic Album - Reprint: Seeds and Stems by Simon Hanselmann
- Best Webcomic: Crisis Zone by Simon Hanselmann
- Best U.S. Edition of International Material: Goblin Girl by Moa Romanova
- Best Archival Collection/Project - Strips: The Flapper Queens: Women Cartoonists of the Jazz Age edited by Trina Robbins
- Best Archival Collection/Project - Comic Books: The Complete Hate by Peter Bagge

2022

- Best Lettering: Monsters by Barry Windsor-Smith
- Best Archival Collection/Project - Strips: Popeye: the E.C. Segar Sundays, vol 1 by E.C. Segar
- Best Graphic Album - New: Monsters by Barry Windsor-Smith

2024

- Best Graphic Album - Reprint: Hip Hop Family Tree: The Omnibus by Ed Piskor
- Best Archival Collection/Project - Strips: Dauntless Dames: High-Heeled Heroes of the Comic Strips edited by Peter Maresca and Trina Robbins
- Best Comics-Related Periodical/Journalism: The Comics Journal #309 edited by Gary Groth, Kristy Valenti, and Austin English

=== Harvey Awards ===
List of won Harvey Awards:

1989

- Best Writer: Gilbert Hernández - Love and Rockets
- Best Continuing or Limited Series: Love and Rockets by Jaime and Gilbert Hernández
- Best Domestic Reprint Project: The Complete Crumb Comics, by Robert Crumb

1990

- Best Writer: Gilbert Hernández - Love and Rockets
- Best New Series: Eightball by Dan Clowes
- Best Continuing or Limited Series: Love and Rockets by Jaime and Gilbert Hernández
- Best Single Issue or Story: Eightball #1, by Dan Clowes
- Best Biographical, Historical, or Journalistic Presentation: The Comics Journal, edited by Gary Groth
- Best Domestic Reprint Project: The Complete Little Nemo in Slumberland, by Winsor McCay

1991

- Best Cartoonist (writer/artist): Peter Bagge, Hate
- Best Letterer: Dan Clowes, Eightball
- Best New Series: Hate by Peter Bagge
- Best Continuing or Limited Series: Eightball by Dan Clowes
- Best Single Issue or Story: Eightball #3, by Dan Clowes
- Best Biographical, Historical, or Journalistic Presentation: The Comics Journal, edited by Gary Groth and Helena Harvilicz
- Best Domestic Reprint Project: The Complete Crumb Comics, by Robert Crumb
- Special Award Excellence in Presentation: The Complete Little Nemo in Slumberland, by Winsor McCay, edited by Richard Marschall, designed by Dale Crain

1992

- Best Inker: Jaime Hernández, Love and Rockets
- Best Continuing or Limited Series: Eightball by Dan Clowes, edited by Gary Groth
- Best Biographical, Historical, or Journalistic Presentation: The Comics Journal, edited by Gary Groth, Helena Harvilicz and Frank Young
- Best Domestic Reprint Project: The Complete Crumb Comics, by Robert Crumb
- Special Award Excellence in Presentation: The Complete Little Nemo in Slumberland, by Winsor McCay, edited by Richard Marschall, art directed by Dale Crain

1993

- Best Biographical, Historical, or Journalistic Presentation: The Comics Journal, edited by Gary Groth and Frank Young
- Best Domestic Reprint Project: The Complete Crumb Comics, by Robert Crumb

1994

- Best American Edition of Foreign Material: Billie Holiday by José Antonio Muñoz and Carlos Sampayo, edited by Gary Grot, Robert Boyd and Kim Thompson
- Best Domestic Reprint Project: The Complete Little Nemo In Slumberland Vol. 6 by Winsor McCay, edited by Bill Blackbeard, packaged by Dale Crain

1995

- Best New Series: Acme Novelty Library by Chris Ware, edited by Kim Thompson
- Best Domestic Reprint Project: The Complete Crumb Comics, by Robert Crumb, edited by Gary Groth and Robert Boyd, art direction by Mark Thompson
- Special Award Excellence in Presentation: Acme Novelty Library, by Chris Ware, edited by Kim Thompson

1996

- Best Letterer: Chris Ware, Acme Novelty Library
- Best Colorist: Chris Ware, Acme Novelty Library
- Best Domestic Reprint Project: The Complete Crumb Comics Vol. II, by Robert Crumb, edited by Mark Thompson
- Special Award Excellence in Presentation: Acme Novelty Library, by Chris Ware, edited by Kim Thompson, art directed by Chris Ware

1997

- Best Writer: Daniel Clowes, Eightball
- Best Letterer: Dan Clowes, Eightball
- Best Colorist: Chris Ware, Acme Novelty Library
- Best Continuing or Limited Series: Eightball by Dan Clowes, edited by Gary Groth
- Best Single Issue or Story: Acme Novelty Library #13, by Chris Ware
- Best Biographical, Historical, or Journalistic Presentation: The Comics Journal, edited by Gary Groth and Tom Spurgeon
- Special Award Excellence in Presentation: Acme Novelty Library, by Chris Ware, edited by Kim Thompson, art directed by Chris Ware

1998

- Best Colorist: Chris Ware, his body of work in 1997, including Acme Novelty Library
- Best New Series: Penny Century by Janime Hernández, edited by Gary Groth
- Best Single Issue or Story:Eightball #18, by Dan Clowes, edited by Gary Groth
- Best Biographical, Historical, or Journalistic Presentation: The Comics Journal, edited by Gary Groth
- Special Award Excellence in Presentation: Acme Novelty Library, by Chris Ware, edited by Kim Thompson, art directed by Chris Ware

1999

- Best Artist or Penciller: Jaime Hernández, his body of work in 1998, including Penny Century
- Best Inker: Charles Burns, Black Hole
- Best Single Issue or Story: Penny Century #3 "Home School", by Jaime Hernández
- Best Biographical, Historical, or Journalistic Presentation: The Comics Journal, edited by Gary Groth and Tom Spurgeon
- Special Award Excellence in Presentation: Acme Novelty Library, by Chris Ware, edited by Kim Thompson, art directed by Chris Ware

2000

- Best Inker: Jaime Hernández, Penny Century
- Best Letterer: Chris Ware, Acme Novelty Library
- Best Colorist: Chris Ware, Acme Novelty Library
- Best Cover Artist: Chris Ware, Acme Novelty Library
- Best New Series: Weasel by Dave Cooper, edited by Gary Groth
- Best Continuing or Limited Series: Acme Novelty Library by Chris Ware, edited by Kim Thompson
- Best Single Issue or Story: Acme Novelty Library #13 by Chris Ware
- Best Biographical, Historical, or Journalistic Presentation: The Comics Journal
- Special Award Excellence in Presentation: Acme Novelty Library #13 by Chris Ware

2001

- Best Artist or Penciller: Jaime Hernández, Penny Century
- Best Inker: Charles Burns, Black Hole
- Best New Series: Luba's Comix and Stories by Gilbert Hernández, edited by Gary Groth
- Best Continuing or Limited Series: Acme Novelty Library by Chris Ware, edited by Kim Thompson
- Best Biographical, Historical, or Journalistic Presentation: The Comics Journal

2002

- Best Cartoonist (writer/artist): Daniel Clowes, Eightball
- Best Inker: Charles Burns, Black Hole
- Best Letterer: Chris Ware, Acme Novelty Library
- Best Colorist: Chris Ware, Acme Novelty Library
- Best New Series: La Perida, by Jessica Abel
- Best Single Issue or Story: Eightball #22 by Dan Clowes

2003

- Best Inker: Jaime Hernández, Love and Rockets
- Best Graphic Album of Previously Published Work: 20th Century Eightball by Daniel Clowes
- Best Anthology: Comics Journal Summer Special 2002
- Best Biographical, Historical, or Journalistic Presentation: B. Krigstein Vol. 1
- Best Domestic Reprint Project: Krazy and Ignatz
- Special Award Excellence in Presentation: Krazy and Ignatz, designed by Chris Ware

2004

- Best Inker: Charles Burns, Black Hole
- Best Cover Artist: Charles Burns, Black Hole
- Best Single Issue or Story: Love and Rockets #9 by Jamie and Gilbert Hernández (tied with Gotham Central # 6-10 by Greg Rucka and Michael Lark)
- Best Domestic Reprint Project: Krazy and Ignatz by George Herriman, edited by Bill Blackbeard

2005

- Best Writer: Daniel Clowes - Eightball
- Best Inker: Charles Burns, Black Hole
- Best Single Issue or Story: Eightball #23 by Daniel Clowes - 2006, Love and Rockets (vol. 2) #15, by Hernández
- Best Domestic Reprint Project: The Complete Peanuts 1950–1952 by Charles Schulz
- Special Award Excellence in Presentation: The Complete Peanuts 1950–1952, by Charles Schulz, designed by Seth

2006

- Best Inker: Charles Burns, Black Hole
- Best New Talent: R. Kikuo Johnson, Night Fisher (split award with tied Marvel Knights 4 by Roberto Aguirre-Sacasa)
- Best Biographical, Historical, or Journalistic Presentation: The Comics Journal, edited by Gary Groth

2007

- Best Cartoonist (writer/artist): Jaime Hernández, Love and Rockets
- Best Domestic Reprint Project: The Complete Peanuts

2008

- Best Domestic Reprint Project: The Complete Peanuts

2009

- Best Domestic Reprint Project: The Complete Peanuts

2011

- Best Continuing or Limited Series: Love and Rockets Vol. 3 by Jaime and Gilbert Hernández

2013

- Best Cartoonist (writer/artist): Jaime Hernández, Love and Rockets
