= Angry Youth Comix =

Publication information
- Publisher: Fantagraphics Books
- Genre: Adult humor
- Publication date: 1994

Creative team
- Created by: Johnny Ryan
- Written by: Johnny Ryan
- Artist(s): Johnny Ryan

Angry Youth Comix is an adult humor comic-book written and drawn by Johnny Ryan. It generally features the characters Loady McGee and Sinus O'Gynus, as well as Blecky Yuckerella, Boobs Pooter, and Sherlock McRape. The comic, like most of Ryan's oeuvre, is generally an attempt to be as shocking and politically incorrect as possible.

Angry Youth Comix was originally self-published by Ryan, producing ten issues from 1994 to 1998. In 1998, he began showing his work to Peter Bagge, creator of Hate comics, who introduced the material to Eric Reynolds of Fantagraphics. The final self-published issue appeared in 1999, with volume 2 of the series being published by Fantagraphics from 2001.

A range of Angry Youth Comix action figures was launched in 2008, featuring Loady McGee and Sinus O'Gynus figures in ordinary and "Toxic Waste" variants.
