= Super Taboo =

Japanese erotic manga series

- Cover of the third issue of Super Taboo, as published by Eros Comix in 1996

SUPERファミリーコンプレックス (Super Family Complex)
- Genre: Hentai, erotic, comedy
- Manga
- Written by: Wolf Ogami
- Published by: Fujimi Publishing
- English publisher: NA: Eros Comix
- Original run: 1993 – 1994
- Volumes: 2

Super Taboo, originally titled Super Family Complex (Japanese: SUPERファミリーコンプレックス, Hepburn: Sūpā Famirī Konpurekkusu), is a sexually-explicit Japanese manga about incest fantasy, by Wolf Ogami (拝狼, Ogami Ōkami; "Worshipping Wolf"). The translation changed the character relationships from stepbrother, stepsister, and stepmother to being blood related.

== Plot ==
The manga is about a high school student named Yuu Sakagami who, raised separately, is reunited with his mother, Misako, and his sister, Eri, who both become infatuated with him. When Yuu becomes sexually aroused his inner demons take over and he is unable to control his actions, and the women in his family, his English teacher from America, and a female neighbor (who is later revealed to be the boy's aunt), are quick to take advantage of this. The situations and humor are similar to the non-sexual manga, Ranma ½, but nearly always have a sexual focus.

Yuu starts out having slept with his sister Eri, but eventually one night he and both his mother and sister get drunk and they have a threesome. The insanity continues when Yuu gets disgusted with what he is doing and leaves the house, only to be taken in by his English professor, who seduces him. This ends with him swearing to give up sex because of how he gives in to his dark desires.

Next readers find Yuu and Eri making wishes for what appears to be New Year's, Yuu wanting to "get it on" with a woman, Miss Sakura. Eri later witnesses said woman having sex with a man, but does not tell Yuu. Yuu decides to get his fortune told, and it comes back with these words; "Doom. Death. Defeat. Despair." Also, it has a tiny message at the bottom; "sorry, kid".

Next readers see an encounter between Yuu and Misako, in which Yuu is eating food made by Misako. The mother is wearing nothing under her apron, and tries to seduce Yuu. Yuu tries in vain to keep from getting aroused, but Misako sits on his lap and that is that. Yuu envisions his "reason" getting run over by a train marked "instinct" and it is off to the races again. Yuu and Misako have sex, after which Yuu looks in horror on what happened and comments that he is going to hell.

Yuu and Eri next arrive home to find their mother passed out after a session of phone sex with her boyfriend. This ends with Eri seducing Yuu again and Yuu giving in once more. Next, Yuu has an encounter with the woman next door, who has the nickname "virgin killer". She mistakes Yuu for a virgin and seduces him using special chocolates. Yuu gives in to instinct again and has sex with her. During her climax it is revealed that the woman next door is actually his aunt. When Yuu gets home, Eri accosts him with an even larger batch of more potent love chocolates.

Yuu then has another encounter with Misako, in which she forces his darker side to stay active so she can have sex with him. Yuu has sex with Eri again, in which he sodomizes her against her will and hurts her pretty badly.

Misako talks with Yuu and it is revealed that Yuu's father had the same problem Yuu does, and that is why he is not around anymore. Misako implores Yuu to keep control, saying that it is all a matter of willpower. Yuu ponders this and envisions a battle within his mind between reason and instinct, both attractive women in this vision, the actual "battle" being a lesbian scene between the two. Yuu eventually chooses reason, and he defeats his dark side. He wakes up and Misako tells him he has won, but soon realizes the regular Yuu is a virgin. She teaches him all about sex in one last encounter, and Yuu goes back to being himself. The story ends with Yuu stating how far he has come since that time, and admitting that he and Eri still have sex.

== Publication ==
One of the most cited hentai titles about incest, Super Taboo is the name given by the English translation of the manga Super Family Complex. Super Family Complex, whose abbreviation is a pun on "Super Famicom", the Japanese name of the Super NES, was originally published in Japan into two tankōbon volumes by Fujimi Publishing between 1993 and 1994. An English translation was released in twelve issues published between 1995 and 1996 by Fantagraphics Books through its Eros Comix imprint. The series was republished into two collected editions by Fantagraphics between 1998 and 1999.

Fantagraphics also published two related series, Super Taboo Extreme and Super Taboo XXX, each in a series of five issues published in 2001 and 2006, respectively. The latter was forbidden to be acquired in Canada by its Border Services Agency because it qualifies as obscene under Canada's Criminal Code. Both series, originally titled Bakara (ばから) and Yawaraka Daisharin (やわらから大車輪), were originally published in a single volume each in 1999 and 2002, respectively. Bakara was republished by Fujimi Publishing in 2014.

== Reception ==
Derek Guder, writing for Manga: The Complete Guide, affirmed "the art and the sex are both extremely simple", comparing its character designs to a Sunday paper's one. However he praised it mainly because of its humor sense that makes it stands out and keeps it "from being just a simply drawn romp between family members". Timothy Perper and Martha Cornog in Sexuality & Culture said Super Taboo and Super Taboo Extreme's "plots have no relationship to the realities of incest, but present an amused and sardonic vision of the foibles and powers of sexual desire". They also argue that "the humor serves to reduce reader anxiety about prohibited desires at the same time the fantasy setting makes it clear that one should not—and need not—emulate the characters".
