= Hatsuinu =

Japanese manga

- First volume of Hatsuinu

初犬
- Genre: Hentai, Romantic comedy
- Manga
- Written by: Inu
- Published by: Issuisya
- Original run: April 22, 2006 – July 11, 2008
- Volumes: 3
- Original video animation

Hatsuinu The Animation
- Directed by: Inu
- Studio: Pink Pineapple; Cafe de Jeilhouse
- Released: March 25, 2007 – July 27, 2007
- Runtime: 30 minutes
- Episodes: 2
- Original video animation

Hatsuinu 2 The Animation - A Strange Kind of Woman ~again~
- Directed by: Inu
- Studio: Pink Pineapple; Office Take Off
- Released: September 26, 2008 – December 26, 2008
- Runtime: 30 minutes
- Episodes: 2

Hatsuinu (初犬; lit. "First Dog") is a Japanese manga written and illustrated by Inu about a series of short hentai stories but "The Strange Kind of Woman" story continues throughout the three volumes. Issuisya has released the 22 chapters of the manga into three bound volumes between April 22, 2006, and July 11, 2008. The manga was adapted into two original video animation series, named Hatsuinu The Animation and Hatsuinu 2 The Animation - Strange Kind of Womans ~again~, respectively.

== Plot ==
While on a train during Tokyo rush hour, high school student Fukaya Mamoru finds himself crushed against his classmate, the silent Fujino Shion (藤乃紫音). Unknown to Mamoru, Fujino has a vibrator in her vagina, which increased its intensity when Mamoru pushed himself against her. Unable to turn off the vibrator discreetly, Fujino endures the train ride while requesting Mamoru to satisfy her sexual cravings, to which he complies. After they get off the train, Fujino gives Mamoru a remote control for her vibrator as a thank you gift. After the incident, Fujino meets Mamoru to satisfy her sexual needs.

Not impressed by Mamoru's libido, she runs off and meets Mita Yuki, a girl who has a crush on Mamoru. Mita gives Fujino a potion that she says will improve Fujino and Mamoru's sex life warning her not to drink it. Curious about the contents of the potion while also thinking about Mamoru's well-being should it be poisoned or contaminated, Fujino drinks it. The potion increases Fujino's sexual desire. In an attempt to rid herself off the effects of the potion, Fujino takes Mamoru into a school bathroom and tells him to repeatedly have sex with her (Fujino's plea for sexual relief is the first and only time when she verbally speaks to him). He does so until she faints. Mamoru takes Fujino to the school nurse. He meets Mita in the hallway and questions her about why Fujino would be so sexually active. In response, Mita feeds him the potion via a kiss. With his libido increased, he takes Mita home, where she forces herself on him. Meanwhile, Fujino wakes up at the nurse's office and wants to know where Mamoru is. The nurse tells her that she last saw him with Mita. Fearing for Mamoru, she runs to his house to find Mita and Mamoru having sex. Disgusted, Fujino runs out of the house, with Mamoru chasing after her. Mamaru explains the situation to her, and they have makeup sex in an alleyway.

One day after getting caught in a fight between Fujino and Mita, Mamoru falls down on his head, causing memory loss. Mita takes advantage of the situation and calls herself his girlfriend. He has sex with both of them and is still confused as to which girl is his girlfriend. Later, a teacher who broke the school doctor's heart when she was a student returns and offers Mita a love potion to best Fujino and win Mamoru ... and the price is only Mita's body!

== Media ==
=== Manga ===
Hatsuinu is written and illustrated by Inu. Issuisya released the 23 chapters of the manga into three tankōbon volumes between April 22, 2006, and July 11, 2008. On April 26, 2010, the manga was re-released as a two volume kanzenban edition called Strange Kind of Woman (ストレンジ・カインドオブウーマン). This version only includes the Strange Kind of Woman stories, i.e. it is missing chapters 1 and 5–9 from volume 1 of Hatsuinu. Eros Comix released an English version of the kanzenban edition as A Strange Kind of Woman, with translations by Toren Smith and Studio Proteus. The first volume was published on November 29, 2011, and the second was released on September 2, 2014.

=== OVAs ===
Hatsuinu The Animation (初犬 The Animation) was released as two original video animation episodes on their individual DVDs by Pink Pineapple between March 25, 2007, and July 27, 2007. This OVA is about how Mamoru becomes Shion's boyfriend and how he fears that she values her vibrator more than him even though they have passionate sex. To solve the problem, Mamoru takes Shion to a swimming pool, where she cannot use her vibrator. However, Fujino is revealed to have a waterproof vibrator with her.

The sequel, Hatsuinu 2 The Animation - Strange Kind of Womans ~again~ (初犬 2 The Animation ストレンジ・カインド オブ ウーマンズ ～again～) is another two-episode original video animation. Pink Pineapple released the OVAs on separate DVDs between September 26, 2008, and December 26, 2008.
