= Bondage Fairies =

Japanese adult manga

ボンデージフェアリーズ (Bondage Fairies)
- Genre: Erotic, Fantasy
- Manga
- Written by: Teruo Kakuta (credited as Kondom)
- Published by: Kubo Shoten
- English publisher: NA: Eros Comix
- Magazine: Young Lemon (World Comics)
- Original run: July 1990 – April 1991
- Volumes: 1

Bondage Fairies (ボンデージフェアリーズ, Bondage Fairies) is an erotic manga about highly sexual, human-shaped female forest fairies with wings. It was originally a series in publisher Kubo Shoten's Young Lemon magazine in 1990, where it was titled Insect Hunter. The manga is drawn by Teruo Kakuta (pen name "Kondom"). The series was later published in the United States with translated English text. It is among the earliest sexually explicit manga (eromanga) commercially published in the United States where it dates from 1994. Jason Thompson in Manga: The Complete Guide mentions it was "the first hit translated adult manga".

The series is about two forest fairies, Pfil (pronounced as either p'fill, or "fill", like the male name Phil) and Pamila, who work as hunters and police protecting the forest, though not all of the series feature them as main characters. Pfil is more naïve and innocent, whereas Pamila is more sexually mature and open, although both frequently and easily engage in all sorts of sexual acts. The sexual content varies from intercourse to masturbation, lesbian sex, to fetishism, to bondage, to bestiality (with animals, including birds and insects). The stories often involve the two fairies saving the forest whilst engaging in various sexual acts. The comics often include small educational sections titled "Pfil’s Educational Comics Corner", with topics ranging from insect behavior to human anatomy.

== Series history ==
Bondage Fairies was first published in Japan by Kubo Shoten in February 1990 under the title Insect Hunter (インセクト・ハンター), a reference to Pamila and Pfil's role as police officers in the forest. The title was changed in April 1993. The first English translation in the United States used the title Bondage Fairies and was issued by Antarctic Press under their Venus Press imprint in 1994–5.

In the United States, Eros Comix subsequently published four multi-volume series of Bondage Fairies:

- The Original Bondage Fairies Books 1 and 2 (Collecting 7 issue narrative)
- The New Bondage Fairies Books 1 and 2 (Collecting 16 issues of short stories)
- The New Bondage Fairies: Fairie Fetish (Collecting 8 issues of short stories)
- Bondage Fairies Extreme Books 1 and 2 (Collecting 15 issues), with translations by Toren Smith and Studio Proteus.

Translations also have been made into Swedish (Epix Förlag), German (BD Erotix), French (Bdérogène), and Italian (E.F. edizioni). A further short story ("Nest Massacre") was published by Kubo Shoten in Kondom's 2005 short story collection Hontō wa Eroi Otogi Banashi ("Truly An Erotic Fairy Tale"). In 2006, a collection of short stories entitled Cruel Sisters was published in Japan containing "The Original Bondage Fairies" and seven re-edited short stories from "Fairy Fetish".
