= Isutoshi =

Japanese manga artist

Isutoshi (いすとし) is a Japanese manga artist, creator of erotic comic series Slut Girl and the non-erotic manga called Tende Freeze! (てんでフリーズ!). He started his career in 1994 producing work that would later be published in dōjinshi by the Gerumaru (ゲルマル) circle. His stories typically involve both erotic and humorous situations, focusing on characters' personality and sexual interaction during the story.

Isutoshi has produced a number of short works for hentai anthologies such as SNK Monogatari, Bruem - King of Fighters and Gensen Sexy Fighters, some of which were collected by Gerumaru in the Renge dōjinshi. Isutoshi has also produced short works published in the monthly hentai magazine Comic Kairakuten Beast.

== Career ==
Isutoshi wrote and illustrated the Japanese erotic manga series Slut Girl (スラッと女, Suratto onna), which humorously focuses on the sex-driven relationship between the chief characters. 'It was first published in 1999 by Fujimi Shuppan. It was translated and published as a six issue series in the U.S. by Eros Comix in 2000. In May 2003 Kodansha released Slut Girl +α, a reprint with an extra chapter. Derek Guder gave the manga series a three-star review in Manga: The Complete Guide, praised for "distinctive" and "expressive" drawings, and the fact that not only are the manga's women well made, but also the recurrent humor: "The story lines are played up for comedic payoff, and you can't help but laugh at the characters' facial expressions liven up otherwise boring sex scenes." Timothy Perper and Martha Cornog praise the expressive translation of the English edition, and describe Sayoko as a "tsuya/yoen" woman, a complex figure with "voluptuous charm" and "bewitching beauty". They describe the manga as being a satire on modern life, especially the role of women in the workplace, and a "long-enduring glass ceiling".

== List of works ==
Published works
Year	Title	Magazine publication	Notes
1997–1998	Slut Girl	COMIC Penguin Club Sanzokuban	
1998–2000	High School Planet Prowler	COMIC Gekiman	
2001–2004	Tende Freeze!	Monthly Afternoon	
2004–2013	Aiki	Young King (Later Monthly Young King)	
2009	Ero-Isu	Various	Tankoban compilation of one-shots
2013–2018	Aiki S	Young King Ours GH	
2018–2019	Furies: Kokuu no Ginyoku	Young King Ours GH	
2020–2022	Delicious Elf	Young King Ours GH	

Published one-shots
Year	Title	Magazine publication	Notes
1997	10X	COMIC Gekiman	Collected in Ero-Isu. Also published in Vol.2 of High School Planet Prowler
2000	Deserted Island Z	COMIC Gekiman	Collected in Ero-Isu
2000	Super Ninja	COMIC Gekiman	Collected in Ero-Isu
2001	Come On Down! Harem Ranch	COMIC Gekiman	Collected in Ero-Isu
2002	Koi Koi	COMIC WARU	Collected In Ero-Isu
2004	Secret Mystery Police	YOUNG COMIC	Also published in Vol.8 of Aiki
2005	Private Battlefield Academy	Comic Kairakuten Beast	Collected in Ero-Isu
2005	Santa Is Seriously Coming	Comic Kairakuten Beast	Collected in Ero-Isu
2006	The Lord King	Comic Kairakuten Beast	Collected in Ero-Isu
2007	Yarase	Comic Kairakuten Beast	Collected in Ero-Isu
2007	1Da 2Da	Comic Kairakuten Beast	Collected in Ero-Isu
2008	The Three Depart	Comic Kairakuten Beast	Collected in Ero-Isu
2024	Poc Wig Egg	Young King Bull	(Published in Issue 2024, No.2)
2025	Poc Wig Egg Pt.II	Young King Bull	(Published in Issue 2025, No.2)

Doujinshi works
Year	Title	Doujin publication	Notes
N/A	The. Sakuraba	Tenge Kentou Club: SF Zero 2	Street Fighter Alpha Doujin: Rose / Sakura
1993	Chaos Girls	Maruchu Seisaku: Turbo Remix	Various Fighting Game Girls
1994	Nande-Koona-Ruru No?	Maruchu Seisaku: Mondou Muyou	Samurai Shodown Doujin: Nakaruru X Galford
1995	Chaos Girls 2	Renge Ver.2	Various Fighting Game Girls
1995	ZeRose	Renge Ver.2	Street Fighter Alpha Doujin: Rose X Ryu
1995	Blue Na Mai-chan	Dennou Butou Musume Vol.3	Fatal Fury Doujin: Blue Mary / Mai X Terry, Andy, Joe
1995	Kintamaazu 95	Maruchu Seisaku: Turbo Remix 2	
1995	Fighting Pai Pai	Maruchu Seisaku: Turbo Remix 2	Jojo's Bizzare Adventure 4 Panel Comic
1995	Ketten 2	Maruchu Seisaku: Turbo Remix 2	Tekken 2 Doujin
1995	(Republished) Blue Na Mai-chan	Maruchu Seisaku: X-Edit	Also Published in Dennou Butou Musume Vol.3
1995	Vampire Fight	Maruchu Seisaku: X-Edit	Dark Stalkers: Morrigan X Hsien-Ko
1996	N/A	Maruchuu Seisaku: Z-Edit	Street Fighter Alpha 4 Panel Comic
1996	N/A	Maruchuu Seisaku: Z-Edit	Street Fighter Alpha Doujin: Sakura
1996	N/A	Maruchuu Seisaku: Z-Edit	SNK 4 Panel Comic
1996	N/A	Maruchuu Seisaku: Z-Edit	King Of Fighters Doujin: Vice & Mature X Kyo
1996	Chapter Zero	Renge Ver. Eva	Evangelion Doujin: Shinji X Masato / Mitsuko / Asuka / Rei
1996	N/A	Renge Ver. Eva	Evangelion 1&2 4 Panel Comic
1996	N/A	Renge Ver. Eva	Evangelion 3&4 4 Panel Comic
1996	N/A	Renge Ver. Eva	Evangelion 5&6 4 Panel Comic
1996	Episode 27	Renge Ver. Eva 2	Evangelion Doujin: Shinji X Asuka / Rei
1996	N/A	Renge Ver. Eva 2	Evangelion #7 4 Panel Comic
1996	N/A	Renge Ver. Eva 2	Evangelion #8 4 Panel Comic
1996	(Republished) Nande-Koona-Ruru No?	Renge Returns R	Republished from Maruchu Seisaku: Mondou Muyou
1996	(Republished) Chaos Girls	Renge Returns R	Republished from Maruchu Seisaku: Turbo Remix
1997	Ayame's Plan	Renge Ver. Sakura	Sakura Wars Doujinshi
1997	Fella.de Nadesilo	Renge Ver. Sakura	Sakura Wars Doujinshi
