= Ali Fitzgerald =

American comic author

- Born: 1983 (age 42–43)
- Notable work: Regular comics in The New Yorker Hungover Bear (McSweeneys) Underground Artists (McSweeneys) Drawn to Berlin (Fantagraphics) Squeak Chatter Bark (Fantagraphics)
- Awards: Independent Publisher’s award for best graphic book of 2019 (Drawn to Berlin)
- Website: https://www.alifitzgerald.com/

Ali Fitzgerald (born 1983) is an American comic author, journalist and artist. She is a regular contributor to The New Yorker. In 2018, she published Drawn to Berlin: Comic Workshops In Refugee Shelters And Other Stories From A New Europe, a graphic non-fiction book about the diverse experiences of exile in Berlin, with Fantagraphics. It was listed as one of the best comics of 2018 by Vulture and won the Independent Publisher's Gold award for best graphic book of 2019.

Scholars of memory studies have commented on the ways in which Drawn to Berlin constructs "multidirectional memory spaces" or on how her work on seescapes in the book expands "the political and ethical purview of the normative refugee imaginary."

== Biography ==
Ali Fitzgerald was born in 1983 in Oakland, California. She studied art and creative writing at Davidson College in North Carolina (2000–2004), where she drew regularly for the college newspaper, The Davidsonian. She attended a residency at Skowhegan School of Painting and Sculpture, before going to University of Texas (2004–2007), where she got an MFA in painting. She moved to Berlin, Germany, in 2009, where she wrote for Art21. In 2020, she attended a comic-artist residency at the Maison des Auteurs in Angoulême, France.

== Works ==
- "Hungover Bear and Friends," McSweeney's, 2013–2016.
- "Bermuda Square," The Cut, 2016–2017.
- "America!" The New Yorker, since 2018.
- Drawn to Berlin: Comic Workshops In Refugee Shelters And Other Stories From A New Europe, Fantagraphics, 2018.
- Réfugiés à Berlin, Editions Presque-Lune, 2019.
- "The Museum of Purgatory," The New Yorker, December 21, 2020.
- "Vanishing Panels: The secret history of Patricia Highsmith’s career in comics," The New Yorker, December 18, 2023.
- Squeak Chatter Bark. An Eco-Mystery, Fantagraphics, 2025.
- "JJ Sempé, Deity of Whimsy," The New Yorker, December 15, 2025.
