= Walt Kelly =

American animator and cartoonist (1913–1973)

- Born: Walter Crawford Kelly Jr. August 25, 1913 Philadelphia, Pennsylvania, U.S.
- Died: October 18, 1973 (aged 60) Woodland Hills, California, U.S.
- Areas: Animator, cartoonist, newspaper journalist, poet, American singer
- Spouses: Helen DeLacy (m. 1937; div. 1951) Stephanie Waggony (m. 1951; died 1970) Selby Daley (m. 1972)
- Children: Kathleen, Carolyn, Peter, Stephen, Andrew, John, Kathryn

Walter Crawford Kelly Jr. (August 25, 1913 – October 18, 1973) was an American animator and cartoonist, best known for the comic strip Pogo. He began his animation career in 1936 at Walt Disney Productions, contributing to Pinocchio, Fantasia, and Dumbo. In 1941, at the age of 28, Kelly transferred to work at Dell Comics, where he created Pogo, which eventually became his platform for political and philosophical commentary.

== Early life ==
Kelly was born of Irish-American heritage in Philadelphia, Pennsylvania to Walter Crawford Kelly Sr. and Genevieve Kelly (née MacAnnula). When he was two years old, the family moved to Bridgeport, Connecticut. After graduating from Warren Harding High School in 1930, Kelly worked at odd jobs until he was hired as a crime reporter on the Bridgeport Post. He also took up cartooning and illustrated a biography of another well-known figure from Bridgeport, P. T. Barnum. Kelly was extremely proud of his journalism pedigree and considered himself a newspaper man as well as a cartoonist.

Kelly became close friends with fellow cartoonists Milton Caniff and Al Capp, and the three occasionally referred to each other in their strips.

== Personal life ==
In 1930, Kelly graduated from high school and met Helen DeLacy at choir practice. DeLacy was a few years older than Kelly. DeLacy left her southern California position as a Girl Scout executive in 1935, hoping to leave Kelly behind. Kelly gave up his job at Bridgeport General Electric and followed DeLacy to Los Angeles, where he took a job at Walt Disney. Kelly and DeLacy then married in September 1937. In 1951, Kelly divorced DeLacy and married Stephanie Waggony; the two remained married until Waggony died of cancer in 1970. Kelly met Selby Daley in the late 1960s while working on The Pogo Special Birthday Special, a television special based on the Pogo comic strip. Kelly and Daley continued to collaborate professionally, and got married in late 1972.

Kelly and DeLacy had three children: Kathleen, Carolyn, and Peter. He and Waggony had three children who survived infancy: Stephen, Andrew, and John. A fourth child, Kathryn Barbara, died before her first birthday, an event he commemorated in the Pogo strip for several years thereafter with a bug character attempting to deliver a cake with one candle.

== Animation career ==
After relocating to Southern California, Kelly found a job at Walt Disney Productions as a storyboard artist and gag man on Donald Duck cartoons and other shorts. In 1939, he requested a transfer to the animation department. Kelly became an assistant to noted Walt Disney animator Fred Moore and became close friends with Moore and Ward Kimball, one of Disney's Nine Old Men. Kelly and Kimball were so close that Kimball named his daughter Kelly Kimball in tribute.

Kelly worked for Disney from January 6, 1936, to September 12, 1941, contributing to Pinocchio, Fantasia, The Reluctant Dragon, and Dumbo. Kelly once stated that his salary at Disney averaged about $100 a week. During 1935 and 1936, his work also appeared in early comic books for what later became DC Comics.

Kelly's animation can be seen in Pinocchio when Mastro Geppetto is first seen inside Monstro the whale, fishing; in Fantasia when Bacchus is seen drunkenly riding a donkey during the Beethoven/"Pastoral Symphony" sequence; and in Dumbo of the ringmaster and during bits of the crows' sequence. His drawings are especially recognizable in The Reluctant Dragon of the little boy, and in the Mickey Mouse short The Little Whirlwind, when Mickey is running from the larger tornado (the tornado even blows a copy of the Bridgeport Post into Mickey's face).

During the 1941 animators' strike Kelly did not picket the studio, as has often been reported, but took a leave of absence, pleading "family illness", to avoid choosing sides. Surviving correspondence between Kelly and his close friend and fellow animator Ward Kimball chronicles his ambivalence towards the highly charged dispute. Kimball stated in an interview years later that Kelly felt creatively constricted in animation, a collective art form, and possibly over-challenged by the technical demands of the form, and had been looking for a way out when the strike occurred.

Kelly never returned to the studio as an animator, but jobs adapting the studio's films Pinocchio and The Three Caballeros for Dell Comics, apparently the result of a recommendation from Walt Disney himself, led to a new and ultimately transitional career.

On May 25, 1960, Kelly wrote a letter to Walt Disney regarding his time at the studio:

Just in case I ever forgot to thank you, I'd like you to know that I, for one, have long appreciated the sort of training and atmosphere that you set up back there in the thirties. There were drawbacks as there are to everything, but it was an astounding experiment and experience as I look back on it. Certainly it was the only education I ever received and I hope I'm living up to a few of your hopes for other people.

== Dell Comics ==
Kelly began a series of comic books based on fairy tales and nursery rhymes along with annuals celebrating Christmas and Easter for Dell Comics. Kelly seems to have written or co-written much of the material he drew for the comics; his unique touches are easily discernible. He also produced a series of stories based on the Our Gang film series, provided covers for Walt Disney's Comics and Stories, illustrated the aforementioned adaptations of two Disney animated features, drew stories featuring Raggedy Ann and Andy and Uncle Wiggily, wrote and drew a lengthy series of comic books promoting a bread company and featuring a character called "Peter Wheat", and did a series of pantomime (without dialogue) two-page stories featuring Roald Dahl's Gremlins for Walt Disney's Comics and Stories #34–41. Kelly also then wrote, drew, and performed on children's records, children's books, and cereal boxes.

So highly regarded was his work that the introduction, likely written by Dell editor Oskar Lebeck, to Fairy Tale Parade #1 spoke of him as "the artist who drew all the wonderful pictures in this book."

Although his health would not allow him to serve in the military, during World War II, Kelly also worked in the Army's Foreign Language Unit illustrating manuals, including several on languages, one of his favorite topics. One manual depicted his friend Ward Kimball as a caveman.

This period saw the creation of Kelly's most famous character, Pogo, who first saw print in 1943 in Dell's Animal Comics. Pogo was almost unrecognizable in his initial appearance, resembling a real possum more closely than in his classic form.

Kelly's work with Dell continued well into the successful run of the newspaper strip in the early 1950s, ending after 16 issues of Pogo Possum (each with all-new material) in a dispute over the republication of Kelly's early Pogo and Albert stories in a comic book titled The Pogo Parade.

== New York Star ==
He returned to journalism as a political cartoonist after the war. In 1948, while serving as art director of the short-lived New York Star (successor to the afternoon liberal tabloid PM), Kelly began to produce a pen-and-ink daily comic strip featuring anthropomorphic animal characters that inhabited the Okefenokee Swamp in Georgia. The first Pogo strip appeared on October 4, 1948. After the New York Star folded on January 28, 1949, Kelly arranged for syndication through the Hall Syndicate, which relaunched the strip in May 1949. Kelly eventually arranged to acquire the copyright and ownership of the strip, which was then uncommon.

== Pogo ==
The Pogo comic strip was syndicated to newspapers for 26 years. The individual strips were collected into at least 20 books edited by Kelly. He received the Reuben Award for the series in 1951.

The principal characters were Pogo the Possum, Albert the Alligator, Churchy LaFemme (a turtle; cf. Cherchez la femme), Howland Owl, Beauregard Bugleboy (a hound dog), Porkypine, and Miss Mam'selle Hepzibah (or Miz Mamzelle Hepzibah, a French skunk). Kelly used the strip in part as a vehicle for his liberal and humanistic political and social views, and satirized, among other things, Senator Joseph McCarthy's anti-Communist demagogy (in the form of a shotgun-wielding bobcat named "Simple J. Malarkey") and the sectarian and dogmatic behavior of communists (in the form of two comically doctrinaire cowbirds).

The setting for Pogo and his friends was the Okefenokee Swamp. The Okefenokee Swamp Park near Waycross, Georgia, now has a building housing Kelly's relocated studio and various Pogo memorabilia.

Additionally, Kelly illustrated The Glob, a children's book about the evolution of man written by John O'Reilly and published in 1952.

== Death ==
Kelly died on October 18, 1973, in Woodland Hills, California, from diabetes complications, following a long and debilitating illness that had cost him a leg. During his final illness, work on the strip had fallen to various assistants and occasionally reprints, and Kelly characteristically joked about returning to work as soon as he regrew the leg. He is sometimes listed as having been interred in the Cemetery of the Evergreens in Brooklyn, New York, but there is no actual grave for him there. He is believed to have been cremated.

== Influences ==
Walt Kelly's Pogo (April 3, 1966)

His influences included cartoonists George Kerr, Frederick Opper, E. W. Kemble, A. B. Frost, John Tenniel, George Herriman, and, especially, T. S. Sullivant. Kelly, a great admirer of Lewis Carroll, was also a prolific poet, especially in the "Anguish Languish" form (of which Deck Us All with Boston Charlie is considered one of the prime examples). Kelly's singing voice, a boozy Irish baritone, can be heard on the Songs of the Pogo album, for which he also supplied the lyrics.

== Legacy ==
Pogo was continued by Kelly's widow, Selby, and various assistants until the summer of 1975. Reprint books continued in a steady stream, including a series reprinting several original books under a single cover according to various themes—romance, elections—that ran into the 1980s. In 1977, Gregg Press reprinted the first ten Pogo books in hardcover editions with dust jackets. In 1995 Jonas/Winter issued another ten Pogo titles in navy blue cloth editions.

In 1988 Steve Thompson issued The Walt Kelly Collector's Guide (Spring Hollow Books), an invaluable and comprehensive resource of Pogo and other Walt Kelly-related memorabilia.

In 1989 the Los Angeles Times attempted to revive the strip with other artists, including Kelly's two children, Carolyn and Peter, under the title Walt Kelly's Pogo. The new strip ran through the early 1990s. Also in 1989, Eclipse Books began publication of a hardcover series called Walt Kelly's Pogo and Albert collecting the early Dell Pogo comic book stories in color, starting with the characters' first appearance in 1943. The series reached four numbered volumes, with volumes two, three, and four subtitled At the Mercy of Elephants, Diggin' fo' Square Roots and Dreamin' of a Wide Catfish, respectively.

In 2003 Reaction Records reissued Kelly's 1956 album Songs of the Pogo on compact disc. The album features Kelly singing his own comic lyrics and nonsense verse to melodies written mostly by Norman Monath. Kelly wrote music to seven of the 30 songs, according to the printed song book. The disc also features the content of Kelly's later recordings, No! with Pogo and Can't! with Pogo, which were issued as children's 45 rpm record sets in 1969, with booklets written and illustrated by Kelly to accompany his recorded performances.

In February 2007 Fantagraphics Books announced that it would begin publication of Pogo: The Complete Syndicated Comic Strips, a projected 12‑volume series collecting the complete chronological run of daily and Sunday strips, to be overseen by Jeff Smith and Kelly's daughter Carolyn. The first volume in the series was scheduled to appear in October 2007 but was delayed, reportedly due to difficulty in locating early Sunday strips in complete form. It was finally released in October, 2011. Volumes two through eight were released between 2012 and 2022, with volume nine announced for May 2026.

In 2013 Hermes Press began reprinting the comic book series of Pogo that predated the comic strip, originally published by Dell Comics. The first two volumes were nominated for the 2015 Eisner Awards, and the third volume came out in late 2015; followed in 2016 by the fourth volume. The fifth volume was released in 2017, with the sixth and final volume appearing in 2018.

Carolyn Kelly, having worked extensively on The Complete Pogo, died on April 9, 2017.

In Nickelodeon's animated series The Loud House, the Loud Family's canary was named after Walt Kelly. Joe Murray, (creator of Rocko's Modern Life and Camp Lazlo) cited Kelly's work as his inspiration to create wacky anthropomorphic animal characters.

== Awards and recognition ==
Kelly has been compared to everyone from James Joyce and Lewis Carroll, to Aesop and Uncle Remus. He was elected president of the National Cartoonists Society in 1954, serving until 1956, and was also the first strip cartoonist to be invited to contribute originals to the Library of Congress.

- 1951: National Cartoonists Society, Reuben Award, Cartoonist of the Year
- 1972: National Cartoonists Society, Silver T-Square Extraordinary Service Award for "outstanding dedication or service to the Society or the profession".
- 1989: The Comic-Con International Inkpot Award (posthumous)
- Walt Kelly, an inductee into the National Cartoon Museum, (formerly the International Museum of Cartoon Art) is one of only 31 artists selected to their Hall of Fame.
- Kelly was also inducted into the Will Eisner Award Hall of Fame in 1995.
