= Rambha =

Rambha may refer to:

- Rambha (apsara), Hindu mythology
- Rambha (asura), king of the Hindu asura demons; once he fell in love with a water buffalo, and Mahishasura was born out of this union
- Rambha (actress) (born 1976), Indian film actress
- Rambha, Orissa, town in southeast India
- "Rambha Ho" or "Ramba Ho", a song by Bappi Lahiri and Usha Uthup from the 1981 Indian film Armaan; remade by Shashwat Sachdev and Madhubanti Bagchi for the 2025 film Dhurandhar

== See also ==
- Ramba (disambiguation)
