= Eric Reynolds (comics) =

Seattle-based cartoonist, critic and comics editor

- Born: 1971 (age 54–55)
- Areas: Cartoonist, Artist, Inker, Editor
- Awards: Inkpot Award (2018)

Eric Reynolds is a Seattle-based cartoonist, critic and comics editor who is the Vice-President and Associate Publisher for Fantagraphics Books. His work has appeared in The Stranger, The Comics Journal, The New York Times, The New York Press and other publications. He has edited or co-edited The Complete Crumb Comics, Angry Youth Comics, Dirty Stories and MOME, and has inked some of Peter Bagge's comics.

== Personal history ==
Reynolds read comics from an early age; hd remembers being fascinated by a stack of Superman comics he saw when he was young.

Reynolds was moving towards a career in journalism when he was in university in California and was managing editor and cartoonist for his university newspaper. In the spring of 1993, he realized that Fantagraphics published almost all of his favorite comics. He contacted them looking for a job. He got a job a month later, and stayed in Seattle for three months before returning to university. After finishing his degree a semester later, he returned to Fantagraphics and has remained there ever since.

Reynolds worked as news editor for The Comics Journal from 1993. He covered such events as the rise of Image Comics, the Mike Diana controversies and the general downturn in the comic book industry, before moving to marketing and promotion in 1996.

As a cartoonist, Reynolds counts Chester Brown and Daniel Clowes as his strongest formative influences, especially Brown's Ed the Happy Clown. He also counts friends and Seattle residents Peter Bagge, Jim Blanchard, Jeremy Eaton, Pat Moriarity, Al Columbia, Jim Woodring and others amongst his contemporary influences.

His name was given to a character who worked for a comic book publisher in an episode of The Simpsons in 2000 by writer and producer Dana Gould. In 2018 he was the recipient of an Inkpot Award from Comic-Con International.

== Publishing history ==
- Slime: the Secret Sex Life of J. Edgar Hoover. Eros Comics, 1995
