= The Little Whirlwind =

1941 Mickey Mouse cartoon

- Theatrical poster
- Directed by: Riley Thomson
- Produced by: Walt Disney
- Starring: Walt Disney; Marcellite Garner
- Music by: Oliver Wallace
- Animation by: Ward Kimball; Walt Kelly; Kenneth Muse; Fred Moore
- Color process: Technicolor
- Production company: Walt Disney Productions
- Distributed by: RKO Radio Pictures
- Release date: February 14, 1941
- Running time: 8 min (one reel)
- Language: English

The Little Whirlwind is an animated short subject, part of the Mickey Mouse series, produced by Walt Disney for Walt Disney Productions. The short was released by RKO Radio Pictures on February 14, 1941. The film was directed by Riley Thomson, and animated by Ward Kimball, Fred Moore, Ken Muse, Jim Armstrong, Les Clark, John Elliotte, Fred Jones, Walt Kelly, and Frank Follmer with effects animation by Art Fitzpatrick. It was the 110th short in the Mickey Mouse film series to be released, and the first for that year.

The short involves Mickey Mouse's attempts to help Minnie with her yard work, despite the presence of several (anthropomorphic) twisters as foils.

== Plot ==
While walking by Minnie Mouse's house one day, Mickey Mouse is enticed by the aroma of a cake Minnie is baking. Promised a slice if he cleans the yard, Mickey immediately jumps into raking up the fall leaves littering Minnie's lawn.

While working in the yard, a small tornado as tall as Mickey comes along and makes his work more complicated: first the tornado hops into the basket and leaps over Mickey countless times before he pounds the basket in place before putting his hammer back in his overalls, shaking it to check if it is snared. After he throws the leaves in, the tornado pounces on him, knocks him onto the ground, grabs his hat, and taunts him. Angered, Mickey pounces on the tornado, who spins him around and scoots away, leaving Mickey's hat on his head. The tornado then scoops a large pile of leaves, flies to Mickey, stuffs the leaves into his overalls, and flies away. As Mickey unstuffs his overalls, the little tornado dives into a red hose and pops out as smaller tornados that merge into one. Both Mickey and the tornado have a tug'o'war on the basket until it shatters on Mickey, who is entangled. Then, the tornado makes an army of leaves and marches about, with the caboose leaf jumping on Mickey's nose which sends his hat on the leaf. Mickey grabs his hat in his mouth, and the leaf taunts him before joining the march, and Mickey untangles himself. As the march moves toward the house, Mickey manages to trap the tornado with a sack, which, after a bit of wrestling, he ties and punts away. The tornado retaliates with just 2 punches, then attempts to get away, with Mickey hot on its heels.

But as he chases the terrified tornado with a rake, Mickey gets pursued by a larger tornado, presumably the parent of a smaller one. Its angry rampage causes chaos and destruction through the farm fields and grasslands until it lifts the lower portion of its gigantic body and slows Mickey's movement. When the twister finally sucks Mickey in, he is sent for a spin until he falls into Minnie's water fountain.

After the two tornadoes leave, Minnie, unaware of the whole incident, finds her garden in a complete mess. Incensed, she throws the cake into Mickey's face and he proceeds to eat the cherry.

== Voice cast ==
- Mickey Mouse: Walt Disney
- Minnie Mouse: Marcellite Garner

== Production ==
Much of the animation of the big tornado is taken from the 1935 Mickey Mouse cartoon The Band Concert.

The Little Whirlwind was the debut for a newly updated Mickey Mouse design: Mickey was given ears that worked in perspective (in lieu of his traditional, unchanging circles for ears), in addition to a slimmer body, larger head, hands and feet as well as buck teeth (the latter lasting for just two shorts; Canine Caddy was the other). This cosmetic change was relatively short-lived, and only lasted for the duration of World War II. The short also temporarily removed Mickey's tail for the same reason.

== Home media ==
The short was released on May 18, 2004 on Walt Disney Treasures: Mickey Mouse in Living Color, Volume Two: 1939-Today.

Additional releases include Walt Disney's Classic Cartoon Favorites Starring Mickey Volume 1, the 2018 Blu-ray/DVD/Digital Celebrating Mickey compilation and the 2023 Blu-ray/DVD/Digital Mickey & Minnie: 10 Classic Shorts - Volume 1 compilation.

== See also ==
- Mickey Mouse (film series)
