= Teruo Kakuta =

Japanese manga artist

- Born: February 18, 1961 (age 65); Ibaraki Prefecture, Japan
- Other name: Kondom
- Occupation: Manga artist
- Spouse: Ai Marito

Teruo Kakuta (born February 18, 1961), pen name Kondom (昆童虫, Kondōmu), is a Japanese manga artist and creator of Bondage Fairies (ボンデージフェアリーズ). His pen name is a multilingual pun, meaning "little insect" in Japanese and "condom" in English. Kondom's manga stories are centred around anthropomorphized creatures such as insects, amphibians, and reptiles. He is married to fellow manga artist Ai Marito (藍まりと, Ai Marito)

== Career ==
Kondom is best known for his long-running Bondage Fairies manga series. The series began in 1990 as Insect Hunter, but it was quickly banned from sale by the Tokyo Metropolitan Ordinance. Under a new title, the manga was serialized in Sexploitation manga magazine Lemon Kids. In 1994, Antarctic Press localized Bondage Fairies through their Venus Comics imprint, and began publishing the manga in comic book instalments. It was later published by Studio Proteus and Eros Comics, along with sequel series The New Bondage Fairies, Bondage Fairies Extreme, and Fairy Fetish.

In recent decades, Kondom's erotic short manga Keyhole reached memetic status online. The story revolves around a doorknob, interpreted as a young woman, interacting with a homeowner's key. Keyhole was drawn in the late 1990s but published in Kondom's 2005 story collection Actually Erotic Fairy Tales (本当はエロいおとぎ話, Hontou wa Eroi Otogibanashi). In 2012, Keyhole was adapted into a feature-length adult video, retitled "I'm a Doorknob...": Keyhole Pu*sy.

== Selected works ==
- Insect Hunter (インセクト・ハンター) (20 February 1990)
- Bondage Fairies (ボンデージフェアリーズ) (5 April 1993)
- Fairy Fetish (フェアリーフェティッシュ) (20 October 1993)
- Bondage Fairies 2 (ボンデージフェアリーズ2) or The New Bondage Fairies (25 November 1994)
- Bondage Fairies 3 (ボンデージフェアリーズ3) or Bondage Fairies Extreme (25 September 1995)
- Fairy Clinic (フェアリー・クリニック) (10 November 2004)
- Actually Erotic Fairy Tales (本当はエロいおとぎ話) (20 July 2005)
