= Ramba (comics) =

Italian comic book

- Ramba, the titular protagonist

Publication information
- Publisher: Eros Comix
- Publication date: October 1992 – June 1994
- No. of issues: 14

Creative team
- Written by: Rossano Rossi, Marco Delizia, Mauro Laurenti, and Fabio Valdambrini
- Artist(s): Rossano Rossi, Marco Delizia, Mauro Laurenti, and Fabio Valdambrini

Ramba is an Italian erotic comic, whose titular protagonist is a hitlady based on the pornographic actress of the same name. The comics are a mixture of action, adventure and adult situations. The comic follows the adventures of Ramba, a mercenary assassin who carries out various murders for hire that drive the storyline, and whose every move is accompanied by sexual activity, with strangers, her employers, and often with her victims.

== Bibliography ==
A typical action scene from Issue 3

- Ramba volume 1 by Rossi, Delizia, and Valdambrini, translated by Stefano Gaudiano. - Seattle, Washington: Eros Comix, 1995. - 125 pages: illustrated; 27 cm. - (Eros Graphic Albums; 15) - "Adults only." - First published in English in the comic book Ramba, issues 1–3, 5–6. - Art is signed "Ross." Call number: PN6767.D4R313 1996
- Ramba volume 2 by Rossi, Delizia, and Laurenti; translated by Stefano Gaudiano. - Seattle, Washington: Eros Comix, 1996. - 125 pages: illustrated; 27 cm. - (Eros Graphic Albums; 22) - Story by story credits for all three "Ramba" albums are given in the advertising at the end of this volume. - Originally published in English in the comic book Ramba, issues 4, 7–10. - Call number: PN6767.D4R3213 1996
- Ramba volume 3 by Rossi, Delizia, and Janni; translated by Stefano Gaudiano. - Seattle, Washington: Eros Comix, 1997. - 101 pages: illustrated; 27 cm. - (Eros Graphic Albums; 29) - Originally appeared in English in the comic magazine Ramba, issues 11–14. - Call number: PN6767.D4R3313 1997

== See also ==
- Bad girl art
- Girls with guns
