= LGBTQ themes in comics =

Bruce Wayne and Dick Grayson in a panel from DC Comics Batman #84 (June 1954), which was used by Frederic Wertham to allege that comic books promote homosexuality.

In comics, LGBTQ themes are a relatively new concept, as lesbian, gay, bisexual, transgender, or queer (LGBTQ) themes and characters were historically omitted from the content of comic books and their comic strip predecessors due to anti-gay censorship. LGBTQ existence was included only via innuendo, subtext and inference. However the practice of hiding LGBTQ characters in the early part of the twentieth century evolved into open inclusion in the late twentieth and early twenty-first centuries, and comics explored the challenges of coming-out, societal discrimination, and personal and romantic relationships between gay characters.

With any mention of homosexuality in mainstream United States comics forbidden by the Comics Code Authority (CCA) between 1954 and 1989, mainstream comics contained only subtle hints or subtext regarding an LGBTQ character's sexual orientation or gender identity. Starting in the early 1970s, however, LGBTQ themes were tackled in underground comix, independently published one-off comic books and series produced by gay creators that featured autobiographical storylines tackling political issues of interest to LGBTQ readers. The first openly gay characters in American comic strips appeared in prominent strips in the late 1970s and gained popularity through the 1980s. Since the 1990s, equal and open LGBTQ themes have become more common in mainstream US comics, including in a number of titles in which a gay character is the star. Today comic strips educating readers about LGBTQ-related issues are syndicated in LGBTQ-targeted print media and online in web comics. Artists that were victimized by discriminatory U.S. laws were never compensated.

The popularity of comic books in Europe and Japan have seen distinct approaches to LGBTQ themes. A lack of censorship and greater acceptance of comics as a medium for adult entertainment in Europe has led European comics to be more inclusive from an earlier date, leading to less controversy about the representation of LGBTQ characters in their pages. Notable comics creators have produced work from France, Belgium, Spain, Germany and Britain. Japanese manga tradition has included genres of girls' comics that feature homosexual relationships since the 1970s, in the form of yaoi and yuri. These works are often extremely romantic and idealized, and include archetypal characters that often do not identify as gay or lesbian. Since the Japanese "gay boom" of the 1990s, a body of manga by queer creators aimed at LGBTQ customers has been established, including both bara manga for gay men and yuri aimed at lesbians, which often have more realistic and autobiographical themes. Pornographic manga also often includes sexualised depictions of lesbians and intersex people.

Portrayal of LGBTQ themes in comics is recognized by several notable awards, including the Gaylactic Spectrum Awards and GLAAD Media Award for Outstanding Comic Book. The Lambda Literary Foundation, recognizing notable literature for LGBTQ themes with their "Lammys" awards since 1988, created a new category in 2014 for graphic works. Prism Comics, an organization formed in 2003 for promoting LGBTQ themes in comic books, has provided the "Queer Press Grant" for comic book creators since 2005.

== Comic strips ==
Panel showing the coming out of a character in 1993 in the comic strip For Better or For Worse. This comic strip caused death threats to be sent to Lynn Johnston, the creator.

Early comic strips also avoided overt treatment of gay issues, though examples of homosexual subtext have been identified. The 1938–1939 edition of Milton Caniff's Terry and the Pirates features a primary villain, Sanjak, who has been interpreted by some as a lesbian with designs on the hero's girlfriend.

The first widely distributed comic strip to tackle LGBT themes and include a gay character was Garry Trudeau's Doonesbury. The strip introduced the character Andy Lippincott in 1976, and his diagnosis with HIV in 1989 and AIDS related death in 1990 was the first representation of this issue in comic strips. This storyline led to a Pulitzer Prize nomination for Trudeau, but three newspapers of the 900 carrying the strip refused to publish it as being in bad taste. Two years later, the long-standing character Mark Slackmeyer was revealed to be gay, continuing a reputation for controversial content. Slackmeyer, a liberal, continues to feature in the strip, with focus on his relationship with his politically conservative partner, Chase, including their marriage in 1999 and separation in 2007.

The 11 July 1984 installment of Bloom County had the strip's main characters staying at Bob & Ernie's Castro Street Hotel, run by a gay S&M couple. The strips released from May 6th through 11th, 1985, featured what is claimed to be one of the first comic strip lesbians, the one-off gag character Alf Mushpie whose main trait is her hatred of men.

When Lynn Johnston's For Better or For Worse explored the coming out of a teenaged character in 1993, it provoked a vigorous reaction from conservative groups. Homophobic readers threatened to cancel newspaper subscriptions, and Johnston received hate mail and death threats towards herself and her family. Over 100 newspapers ran replacement strips or canceled the comic. One result of the storyline was that Johnston was made a jury-selected "nominated finalist" for the Pulitzer Prize for Editorial Cartooning in 1994. The Pulitzer board said the strip "sensitively depicted a youth's disclosure of his homosexuality and its effect on his family and friends." Subsequent appearances of the character have not focused on his sexuality, and the creator has said that this will continue.

In most widely circulated strips, LGBT characters remained as supporting figures into the 21st century, with some, including Candorville and The Boondocks, featuring occasional appearances by gay characters. The conservative strip Mallard Fillmore occasionally approached gay issues from a critical perspective; these storylines have been described as "insulting" to LGBT people. Many openly gay and lesbian comic creators self-publish their work online as webcomics, giving them greater editorial freedom, and some of the strips are printed in collections. One example is Greg Fox's Kyle's Bed & Breakfast, a series focusing on a group of gay friends who live together and face realistic problems associated with their sexualities, including relationship troubles and being closeted.

Since the late 1980s, specifically gay publications have also included comic strips, in which LGBT themes are ubiquitous. Local LGBT newspapers sometimes carry their own strips, like Ron Williams's Quarter Scenes in the New Orleans paper Impact. Strips including Wendel by Howard Cruse, It's a Gay Life by Gerard Donelan, and Leonard and Larry by Tim Barela, have been syndicated in national gay magazines like the Advocate.

One of the best known and longest-running LGBT comic strips, Dykes to Watch Out For, was written by Alison Bechdel – dubbed the "elder stateswomen of LGBT comics" – from 1983 to 2008. Dykes to Watch Out For is known for its social and political commentary and depictions of characters from all walks of life. Bechdel's 2006 graphic memoir Fun Home: A Family Tragicomic was lauded by many media outlets as among the best books of the year.

Other noted LGBT-themed comic strips have included Doc and Raider, The Chosen Family, Chelsea Boys and The Mostly Unfabulous Social Life of Ethan Green. Ethan Green has also been adapted into a live-action feature film.

== Early homoerotic magazines ==
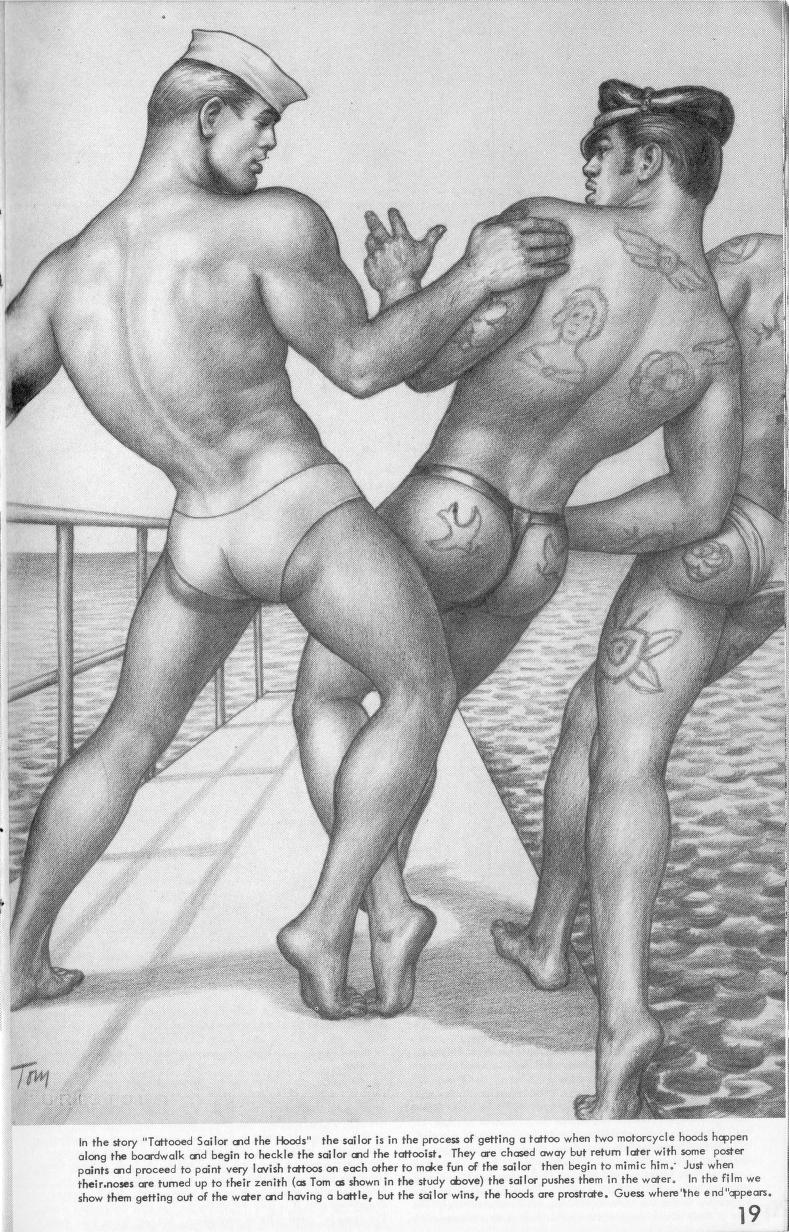
A Tom of Finland drawing printed in a 1962 issue of Physique Pictorial.

Touko Laaksonen, better known as Tom of Finland, has been described as "the first gay cartoonist". He began producing erotic comics in the 1940s, distributing them via a clandestine mail-order business. Laaksonen's drawings were published in the beefcake magazine Physique Pictorial starting in the 1950s. Due to obscenity laws, Laaksonen's full, sexually explicit comics could not be published at the time, and were instead distributed privately. Other artists who regularly contributed to early homoerotic periodicals during this time include George Quaintance, and Dom Orejudos (under the pen name Etienne).

== Underground and alternative comics ==
LGBT themes were found first in underground or alternative comics, often published by small independent presses or self-published. Such comics frequently advocated political positions and included depictions of sex, usually not intended solely to cause arousal but included as part of the exploration of themes including gender and sexuality.

“Captain Pissgums and His Pervert Pirates” by S. Clay Wilson in Zap Comix #3 (1968) featured explicit sexual homosexual acts and was instrumental in making other underground cartoonists approach taboo subjects. However, gay characters rarely featured in underground comics from 1968 to 1975, and when they did they were usually lisping caricatures and comic transvestites. An installment of "Harold Hedd" by Rand Holmes in 1971 stands out for attacking the homophobia of David Reuben's sex manual Everything You Always Wanted to Know About Sex* (*But Were Afraid to Ask), featuring explicit mutual gay sex acts, and promoting gay liberation.

Eventually comics appeared aimed at a gay audience: the first documented example of a widely circulated underground gay comic was Gay Heart Throbs, which produced several issues in the mid-1970s, but struggled to find an audience.

Notable publications included Gay Comix, which was created in 1980 by Howard Cruse, featured the work of LGBT artists, and had close ties with the gay liberation movement. Much of the early content was autobiographical, but more diverse themes were explored in later editions. Autobiographical themes included falling in love, coming out, repression, and sex. Gay Comix also served as a source for information about non-mainstream LGBT-themed comics and events. Artists producing work for Gay Comix included Mary Wings, creator of the first one-off lesbian book Come Out Comix (1972) and Dyke Shorts (1976), and Roberta Gregory, who created Dynamite Damsels (1976) the first lesbian underground serial comic book and the character Bitchy Bitch. Wimmen's Comix also tackled issues of homosexuality on a regular basis, and the first issue was also the venue for the first comic strip featuring an out lesbian, called "Sandy Comes Out", by Trina Robbins. Excerpts from Gay Comix are included in the 1989 anthology Gay Comics, one of the earliest histories of the subject.

Meatmen: An Anthology of Gay Male Comics and its sequels collect works by a range of artists and cartoonists. The work of "every gay cartoonist of note" at the time appeared in the series, including works by Howard Cruse, Jeffrey A. Krell, Brad Parker, John Blackburn, Jon Macy, and Tom of Finland. The contents of Meatmen are generally male-oriented, and more explicitly sexual than the intentionally gender-balanced Gay Comics. Tom of Finland was a prolific fetish artist, specializing in images of men with exaggerated primary and secondary sex traits, such as extreme muscularity and improbably large penises. His drawings frequently feature two or more men either immediately preceding or during explicit sexual activity. Howard Cruse has been described as "the most important gay cartoonist" of this period, and his work explores both pop and gay culture. In addition to being featured in Meatmen and Gay Comics, his LGBT-themed work has been syndicated in publications such as Heavy Metal, RAW, and Village Voice.

Creators have used the comics medium to educate readers about LGBT-related issues including safe sex, examples being Strip AIDS; and to influence real-world politics, as with the British comic book AARGH (Artists Against Rampant Government Homophobia), produced by British, American, and Canadian artists in response to a law that made "promoting homosexuality" illegal by the British government. The comic book format and humour has been described as giving such works a more positive message than typical education material. Comic strip style educational material about AIDS dates back to a chart in the French magazine Liberation from 1986, which used simple figures to explain unsafe practices. Fiction comics produced specifically to foster AIDS prevention include the widely distributed French-language La Sida (1995), created by the Institut Alfred Fourrier as part of its "Prevention Sourire" series. La Sida was aimed at a young audience and used humour to de-dramatise the subject, with HIV status indicated as a metaphorical "little green monster". Sexile, a graphic novel by Latin American writer Jaime Cortez, is based on transgender HIV activist and educator Adela Vazquez. Published through AIDS Project Los Angeles, the novel is narrated in English and Spanish while commenting on themes of gender identity, sexual experiences and HIV/AIDS awareness. Vazquez's life is highlighted in the graphic novel, particularly her transition from the political uprising in Cuba to the vibrant LGBT community in San Francisco during the HIV/AIDS epidemic. Sexile, a work commenting on HIV/AIDS prevention, was collaborated with Gay Men's Health Crisis.

Such educational comics have been criticised for ignoring the special relevance the subject has to the LGBT community, with homosexuality marginalized in favour of depicting HIV as a threat to conventional heterosexual relationships. This has been blamed on the continuing perception that comics are for young people, and as such should be "universalised" rather than targeting specific groups, and hence are heteronormative, failing to provide characters that LGBT-identifying young people can identify with. Other educational comic books such as the Swiss Jo (1991) also exclude explicit reference to homosexuality (as well as drug-taking and prostitution), in spite of their target audience being older.

In 2010, Northwest Press began publishing LBGTQ themed works, focusing primarily on graphic novels and anthologies of artists' shorter works.

No Straight Lines, a 2012 anthology published by Fantagraphics Books edited by Justin Hall, presented an overview of comics by and about lesbian, gay, bisexual, and transgender people since the 1960s.

== Mainstream American comic books ==
Mainstream comics have historically excluded gay characters, with superhero comics in particular and the publishing houses Marvel and DC, the two largest publishers in the genre, and were criticized for their lack of inclusivity. Transgender characters have likewise been under-represented, although the common storyline of a superhero having their sex changed by magical or technological means has been regarded as an oblique reference to transgender and transsexual issues. British comics author Neil Gaiman has said that he included transgender characters in his works, such as Sandman, in response to the lack of realistic representation of such people in comics. Queer theory analyses have noted that LGBT characters in mainstream comic books are often shown as assimilated into heterosexual society, whereas in alternative comics the diversity and uniqueness of LGBT culture is at the forefront. Mainstream comics have also been labelled as "heteronormative", in comparison to "integrationist" alternative comics.

=== Censorship and criticism ===
For much of the 20th century, creators were strongly discouraged from depicting gay relationships in comic books, which were regarded as a medium for children. Until 1989 the Comics Code Authority (CCA), which imposed de facto censorship on comics sold through newsstands in the United States, forbade any suggestion of homosexuality, and LGBT characters were excluded from comics bearing the CCA seal. The CCA itself came into being in response to Fredric Wertham's Seduction of the Innocent, in which comic book creators were accused of attempting to negatively influence children with images of violence and sexuality, including subliminal homosexuality. Wertham claimed that Wonder Woman's strength and independence made her a lesbian, and stated that "The Batman type of story may stimulate children to homosexual fantasies." Storytellers subsequently had to drop subtle hints while not stating directly a character's orientation. Overt gay and lesbian themes were first found later in underground and alternative titles which did not carry the CCA's seal of approval.

In recent years the number of LGBT characters in mainstream superhero comics has increased greatly. At first gay characters appeared in supporting roles, but their roles have become increasingly prominent. The trend has prompted both praise from the LGBT community and organizations like the Gay & Lesbian Alliance Against Defamation (GLAAD), and criticism from conservative groups. Critics have made accusations that comics are attempting to subvert readers into a "gay lifestyle", trying to "lure young American boys into the kinky web of homosexuality and AIDS".

=== DC Comics ===
The Encyclopedia of Gay Histories and Cultures (2000) notes that gay subtext can be found in DC Comics publications as early as the Golden Age of Comic Books, with readers inferring homosexuality between superheroes and their same-sex sidekicks and on the women-only Paradise Island. The introduction to Sandman Mystery Theatre: The Tarantula discusses this in the case of the replacement of Dian Belmont with Sandy, the Golden Boy in The Sandman serial in Adventure Comics. Batman's relationship with Robin has famously come under scrutiny, in spite of the majority of creators associated with the character denying that the character is gay. Psychologist Fredric Wertham, who in Seduction of the Innocent asserted that "Batman stories are psychologically homosexual," claimed to find a "subtle atmosphere of homoeroticism which pervades the adventures of the mature 'Batman' and his young friend 'Robin.'" It has also been claimed that Batman is interesting to gay audiences because "he was one of the first fictional characters to be attacked on the grounds of his presumed homosexuality," and "the 1960s TV series remains a touchstone of camp." Frank Miller has described the Joker as a "homophobic nightmare," and views the character as sublimating his sexual urges into crime fighting. Burt Ward has also remarked upon this interpretation in his autobiography, noting that the relationship between the two could be interpreted as a sexual one.

Wedding of Midnighter and Apollo in DC Comics. Partial panel from Transfer of Power graphic novel (2002)

In the first appearance of the Nightmaster, a fat man who seems to be a closet homosexual gay basher repeatedly calls Jim Rook a "cutie pie", compliments his hair, and grabs his girlfriend, saying (to Rook) "And what? You gonna hit me with your purse?" after which his friends start hitting Rook with a chair. The first obviously gay character featured by DC was Extraño, an effeminate Peruvian man whose name means "strange" in Spanish, created by Steve Englehart and Joe Staton, and appeared in Millennium and New Guardians in 1987. (Note: First appearance in Millennium #2 (1987)) New Guardians was not successful, but during its short run it also featured one team member, Jet, contracting AIDS. The series was controversial, as several characters on the team were infected with HIV through the scratch of a character called the Hemo-Goblin. Many angry letters were printed in response to this misinformation about HIV transmission, along with some gay readers complaining that Extraño was too stereotypical. An official aftermath to Millennium, The Spectre (vol. 2) #11, depicted a "mostly male and mostly gay" AIDS rally. Several characters, including the Enchantress (describing them as "filthy disgusting men") and a police helicopter pilot named Ed (screaming about "fags") are influenced into attempting to crush the rally by a seven-headed spirit. Thanks to the actions of the Spectre, Doctor Fate, Deadman, Madame Xanadu (later herself revealed to be bisexual), and Ben Turner, the men are saved.

In 1988's Wonder Woman Annual #1, Kevin Mayer, brother of Diana's late publicist Myndi Mayer, shows up at her will reading, saying she was the only member of the family who didn't hate him for being gay. Later in the same series, an Amazon historian mentions widespread homosexual activity, as well as asexuality, amongst the population of Wonder Woman's homeland, Themyscira. Mitch Sekofsky, mechanic for Task Force X, is a gay dad. Simon La Grieve, the organization's head psychiatrist, refers to this as his "choice of sexuality" and wonders how Sekofsky's son is adjusting. Priest Kramer counsels Mitch and tells him that his homosexuality is a natural part of himself that does not conflict with Christian scripture. The early 1990s saw a few more LGBT minor characters portrayed in DC titles. John Constantine dealt with gay bashers in Hellblazer #6 and 7 and Swamp Thing #74 (1988). In the latter issue, Constantine, having jumped from a train at the end of Hellblazer #6, is found by gay bashers in a weakened state and severely beaten until rescued by Swamp Thing. While Constantine is not gay (he is bisexual), one of his gay friends was beaten to death in Hellblazer #7 by a fundamentalist Christian cult. In an earlier issue, a group of skinheads follow a man they presume to be gay into a toilet with the intention of killing him, but he turns out to be the demon Nergal, who tears them apart. Both this run and The Sandman story arcs Preludes and Nocturnes and The Kindly Ones arc featured elderly gay men. Transsexual themes were explored in The Sandman: A Game of You (1991) and in a 1992 storyline in Legion of Super-Heroes with transgender character Shvaughn Erin. In 1993, writing duties for the Doom Patrol comic series were taken over by the transgender writer Rachel Pollack who used the series to explored many LGBT themes as well as introduced the character of Coagula, a transgender lesbian, to the team.

Notable storylines featuring LGBT themes include the coming out of Kyle Rayner's assistant Terry Berg and an arc about his "gay bashing" in Green Lantern. (Note: In Green Lantern #137 (June 2001) and #154 (November 2001)) These stories earned the writer two GLAAD awards and a Gaylactic Spectrum Award (and a further nomination). Green Lantern also has a lesbian couple, Lee and Li, as supporting characters. An example of a gay character in a starring role is the violent vigilante superhero Midnighter, who appears in comic books published by Wildstorm, an imprint of DC Comics. (Note: First appearance Stormwatch (vol. 2) #4 (1998)) The Batman-like Midnighter was revealed to be in a relationship with the Superman-like Apollo during their time as members of the superhero team The Authority.

The comic book Manhunter (which focused on a female lawyer hunting down super villains who dodged trial) was notable for featuring the gay supporting character of Damon Matthews, a well-adjusted gay lawyer who later starts dating superhero Obsidian, and also Manhunter's son and successor, Ramsey Spencer, who is also openly gay and dates the metahuman hero and his partner named Justin. In 2006 DC drew widespread media attention by announcing a new, lesbian incarnation of the well-known character Batwoman. The number of minor DC characters being identified as LGBT continues to increase, and includes the bisexual superheroes Sarah Rainmaker and Icemaiden, and the reformed gay villain Pied Piper. Policewoman Renee Montoya, introduced in Batman: The Animated Series without any stated sexual preference, was eventually introduced in the comic books as a lesbian and made considerably more butch. Montoya was a main character in Gotham Central and 52.

In 2011, DC launched its The New 52 program, which introduced a number of new titles. In addition to a new Batwoman series, DC released Voodoo, which featured an African American bisexual woman as the title character. Additionally, The New 52 also introduced Bunker, the first openly gay superhero ever to be featured in the Teen Titans ongoing series. Another of the changes brought about with the DC reboot was the reinvention of a classic character as an out gay man, with DC as of 2012 depicting its longtime Green Lantern Alan Scott as a gay man in stories set on the parallel world of Earth-2. In 2020, as part of its Infinite Frontier relaunch, DC established the mainstream continuity's Scott as canonically gay as well, by having him come out to his adult children. This incarnation of Scott has been depicted on-and-off since 1940.

Anti-villains Catwoman and Catman were reinvented as bisexual characters, as well as anti-villainesses Poison Ivy and Harley Quinn, who form a non-monogamous couple. Supervillain Prometheus is now a gay man who dated Midnighter. Demon Knights reintroduced the character of Ystina, who previously appeared in Grant Morrison's Seven Soldiers of Victory as a girl crossdressing as a male knight. In the new series however, Ystina says that (s)he is "not just a man or a woman[, but] both." This makes them the possible first intersex hero.

In 2016, DC launched DC Rebirth, in which some characters were established as being LGBT. Flagship superhero Wonder Woman was shown to be canonically bisexual; among her same-sex romantic interests is her companion Amazon Kasia. Her mother Queen Hippolyta and General Philippus are also shown as having a love relationship, and Hippolyta previously dated Amazon sorceress Derinoe as shown in the New 52 era. Aqualad (Jackson Hyde) of Teen Titans was reintroduced as a gay teenager, while The Ray was reintroduced as a gay man in Justice League of America, dating his JLA colleague Xenos. Mother Panic, from the Young Animal imprint, is a bisexual female vigilante of Gotham City. In 2021, coinciding with Infinite Frontier, several high-profile male characters came out as LGBT in canon: original Green Lantern Alan Scott came out to his children as gay; Robin (Tim Drake) began dating Bernard Dowd after acknowledging he has feelings for both men and women; and Superman's son, Jon Kent, came out as bisexual.

=== Marvel Comics ===
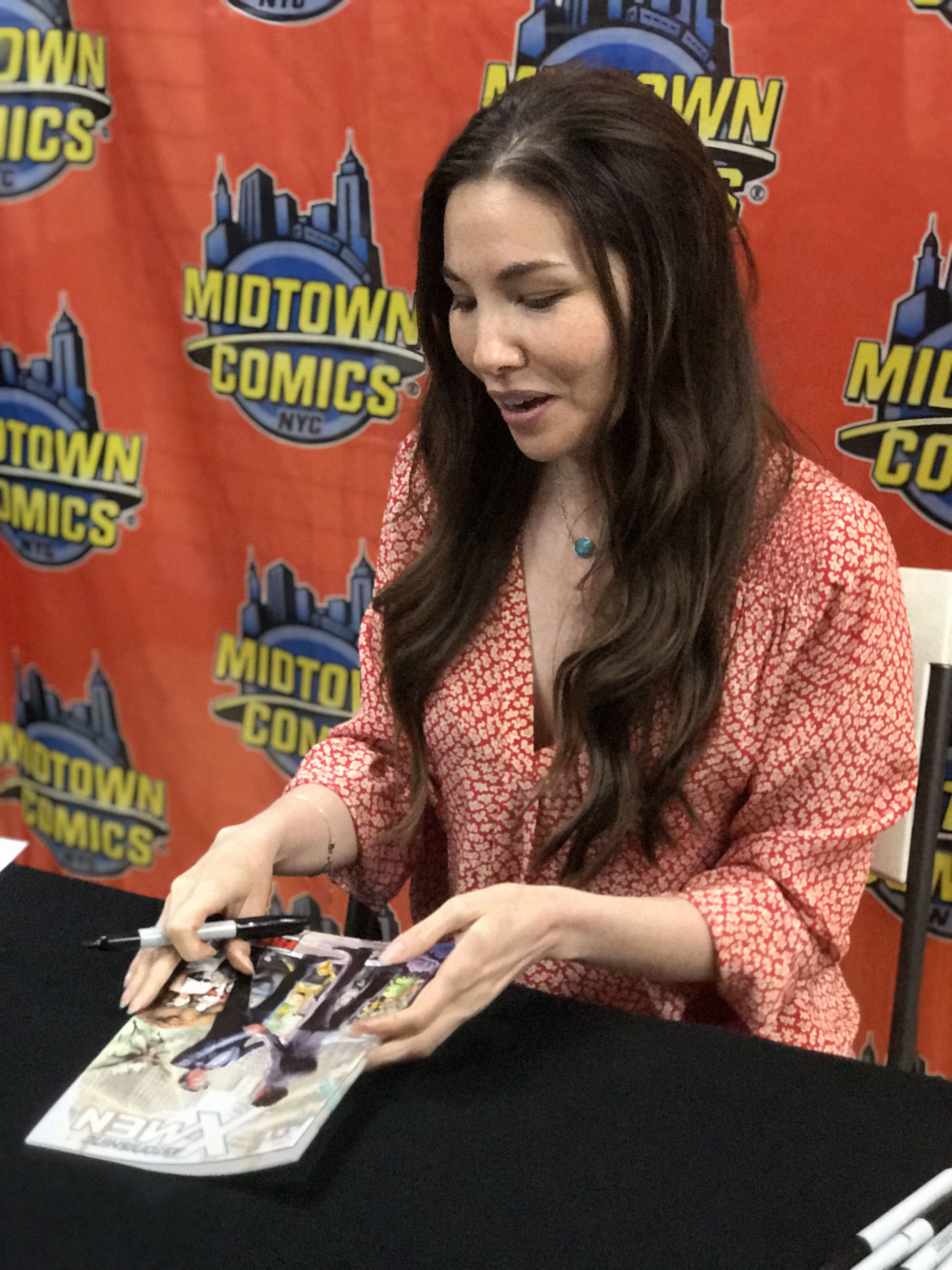
Writer Marjorie Liu autographing a copy of Astonishing X-Men #51 (August 2012), in which she depicted the marriage of superhero Northstar and Kyle Jinadu, the first same-sex wedding in mainstream comics

Marvel Comics' incorporation of LGBT themes has been unfavorably compared with that of DC; its use of gay characters has been described as "less prolific but more deliberate". Marvel reportedly had a "No Gays in the Marvel Universe" policy during Jim Shooter's 1980s tenure, and Marvel's policy from the 1990s had stated that all series emphasizing solo gay characters must carry an "Adults Only" label, in response to conservative protests. However, these policies did not stop creators from slipping in gay characters and themes; J. M. DeMatteis introduced Arnie Roth, a childhood friend of Steve Rogers, who comes to Cap seeking help in rescuing his "roommate" Michael. (Note: Captain America v.1 #270) Later, Arnie himself is captured by Baron Zemo and forced to dress in flamboyant clothes and stage make-up and give a speech about how his love for Michael is false and unnatural. Cap rescues Arnie and reassures him that his love for Michael is as genuine as Cap's own love for his girlfriend. (Note: Captain America v.1 #293-301) The story appears to have gone under the radar purely because DeMatteis did not use the word "gay". Subsequent official character biographies have confirmed Arnie Roth as gay. As of 2006, these policies are no longer enforced and LGBT characters appear regularly in Marvel comics. Although same-sex couples are depicted occasionally kissing, intimate or sexual scenes have not been shown, even in Marvel's "Adult only" imprint. The use of mutants and the discrimination they face in the X-Men comics has been seen as a metaphor for the real-world discrimination directed at minority groups including LGBT people.

Northstar, a member of the original Alpha Flight superhero team, was the first major gay character created by Marvel Comics. Creator John Byrne said that Northstar was planned to be gay from his inception in 1979. The character was finally revealed to be gay in 1992's Alpha Flight issue 106, the only comic book issue to have been inducted into the Gaylactic Hall of Fame. Storylines involving Northstar in Alpha Flight and his limited series have generally ignored his sexuality: criticism was directed at the fact that Northstar was never been shown kissing another man. Northstar was finally shown kissing his boyfriend Kyle Jinadu in the first issue of the 2011 relaunch of the series and eventually became a member of the X-Men. During his time in this team he became a mentor to gay teenage mutant Anole, who later became a Young X-Men member along with another gay teen, Graymalkin. During Marjorie Liu's run on Astonishing X-Men, she depicted Northstar's wedding to Jinadu in issue #51 (August 2012), the first same-sex wedding in mainstream comics.

Ultimate X-Men depicts an alternate version of Northstar who is in a same-sex relationship with that dimension's Colossus. Previously, Colossus developed an unrequited passion for his friend Wolverine.

Rictor and Shatterstar kiss in Marvel Comics Universe. Art by Marco Santucci.

Other LGBT members of Marvel's mutant teams are the Uncanny X-Men Benjamin Deeds and Hindsight, New Mutants Karma, X-Statix's Phat, Vivisector, and Bloke (until their deaths) and the villains Mystique and Destiny. In X-Factor (Vol 3) #45 (August 2009), written by Peter David, depowered mutant Rictor and his longtime friend Shatterstar (with whom he previously had an ambiguous relationship) (Note: See, for example: Cable #22, X-Force #56, X-Force #59–60, X-Force #60, X-Force '99 Annual) were shown in an on-panel kiss. (Note: X-Factor (Vol 3) #45. Marvel Comics (New York).) After the issue was published, David confirmed Rictor and Shatterstar's bisexuality in his blog and expressed his desire to develop the relationship between them further. Shortly after, one of Shatterstar's creators, Rob Liefeld, expressed his disapproval of David's decision and has stated that should he get the chance, he will undo Rictor and Shatterstar's bisexuality. Despite Liefeld's complaints, both David and Marvel editor-in-chief Joe Quesada defended the development, and Rictor and Shatterstar's relationship remained. David went on to win the 2011 GLADD Media Award for Outstanding Comic Book for his work.

In 1997, writer Ivan Velez Jr., who had previously written for the adult underground Gay Comix, reintroduced Jennifer Kale with a closely cropped "butch" haircut in the pages of Ghost Rider, portrayed her as related to both Johnny Blaze and Daniel Ketch, and said that an issue of Howard the Duck had shown Jennifer and Doctor Strange as those who initially brought Howard to Earth-616 (no such issue of Howard the Duck exists, and Jennifer and Doctor Strange did not meet until Man-Thing (vol. 2) #4 (May 1980)), after Howard's series had concluded). In issue #92 (January 1998), he depicted Ketch having a vision of life without Ghost Rider in which Jennifer had been in a relationship with a woman, Marie, for three years. Jennifer's first boyfriend, Jaxon, was shown in Fear #13 (April 1973) and #18 (November 1973) and Man-Thing (vol. 2) #4 (May 1980), by which point they had broken up over Jennifer's sorcery. She was shown sharing a bed with a chubby boyfriend named Bernard Drabble in The Legion of Night (October 1991), which was written by her creator, Steve Gerber (later writer of the GLAAD Award-nominated Hard Time), who thought making her related to both Ghost Riders was bad writing, saying that Marvel should change its name to DC for "Deliverance Comics" for being so inbred (he did not read the issues in question, nor was he told of Jennifer's newfound lesbianism). In Witches, Brian Patrick Walsh presents her with the attitude that having slept with women makes her a "bad girl" as a direct character foil to Topaz as a "good girl" (which does not match earlier portrayals of Topaz), and Satana as "the ugly." In Marvel Zombies 4, Topaz teasingly calls Jennifer "girlfriend" to be ironic. Her entry in the Official Handbook of the Marvel Universe now states that she is bisexual.

In 2002, Marvel revived Rawhide Kid in their Marvel MAX imprint, introducing the first openly gay comic book character to star in his own magazine. The first edition of the Rawhide Kid's gay saga was called Slap Leather. The character's sexuality is conveyed indirectly, through euphemisms and puns, and the comic's style is campy. Conservative groups protested the gay take on the character, which they claimed would corrupt children, and the covers carried an "Adults only" label.

The Young Avengers series, which debuted in 2005, featured two gay teenager major characters, Hulkling and Wiccan, from its inception. The characters' sexuality was criticised by some readers and defended by the writers in an extended series of letters on the title's letters page. The Young Avengers earned Marvel its first GLAAD Award Best Comic Book Award in 2005. The 2013 Young Avengers by Kieron Gillen won a second GLAAD Award, awarded both to Gillen and artist Jamie McKelvie. In that series, Gillen revealed nearly the entire team as some form of LGBT, including Prodigy (David Alleyne), Miss America, Loki, and Noh-Varr. Speed (Tommy Shepherd), the reincarnated twin of Wiccan, was revealed to be bisexual in 2020, and is currently in a relationship with Prodigy.

Xavin is a non-binary/genderqueer Skrull (a race of shape-shifters) from the award-winning series, Runaways. Xavin was created by author Brian K. Vaughan and artist Adrian Alphona, and debuted in Runaways vol. 2 #7. Xavin had first appeared to the Runaways in their masculine form, but changed into their feminine form for the sake of Karolina Dean, a lesbian hero whom they were to marry. In the series, Xavin often switches between their two forms.

One 2010 comic includes a development which suggests that Hercules had an off-panel sexual encounter with gay male superhero Northstar at an earlier point in time. X-Treme X-Men vol. 2 #7 (2013) depicts an alternate version of Hercules who is in a same-sex relationship with that dimension's Wolverine, the British Governor General of the Dominion of Canada, who is known as Howlett.

In April 2015 Marvel Comics announced that its X-Men character Iceman, Bobby Drake was gay. In the "All-New X-Men" comic book storyline, the mind-reading mutant Jean Grey asks Bobby why he calls women "hot," when she knows he is gay. In 2017, Iceman received his first ongoing solo series, which focused on the adult Bobby Drake coming to terms with life as an out gay man, his Omega-level superpowers, his legacy as a hero and fighting some of the biggest villains in the Marvel Universe. The book had been cancelled, with its last issue being in early 2018, but Marvel has since announced a new Iceman ongoing series beginning in September 2018.

Mark Waid, writer of Black Widow #9, discussed that "[Both Natasha and Bucky] have had a crush on Steve Rogers at some point in the past" hinting that Bucky Barnes may be bisexual.

=== Archie Comics ===
In September 2010, Archie Comics introduced an openly gay character, Kevin Keller in Veronica #202, though it was only published in the U.S. and Canada. In the story, Veronica quickly falls for the new-boy-in-town, with a sweet smile and chiseled good looks, Kevin. Kevin beats Jughead in a burger-eating contest, and he tells Jughead that he's not interested in Veronica because he's gay. Unbeknownst to Kevin, Jughead has a score to settle with Veronica. So, when Jughead requests for Kevin not tell Veronica about his sexuality, Kevin willingly agrees. The bulk of the story is about Veronica's cluelessness.

As Archie Comics had been considered traditional, predictable, and wholesome publishers for generations, the company's open recognition of homosexuality through the addition of Kevin Keller came as a surprise to many readers. However, as Lyle Masaki of AfterElton.com recognizes, "There is a long-standing misconception that sexuality has to be a part of a gay character, but being gay doesn't have anything to do with sex." Kevin went on to star in his own mini-series, and now is the star of his own digest-size series, and guest starred in the Life with Archie: The Married Life series, with the issue depicting his wedding becoming one of the fastest selling Archie comics in decades.

=== Other publishers ===
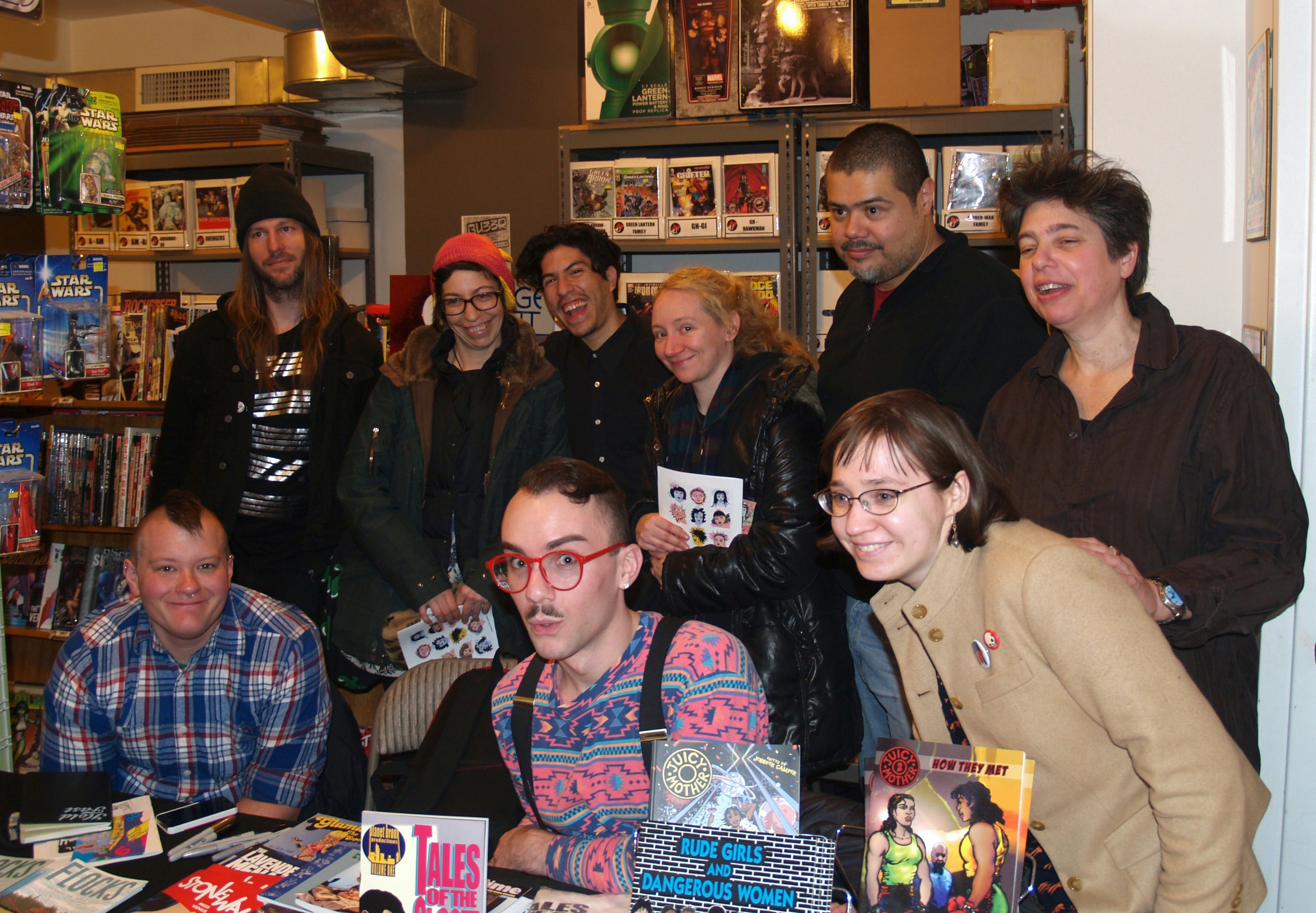
2014 signing for the LGBT anthology Qu33r at Jim Hanley's Universe in Manhattan. From left to right, back row, are Sabin Calvert, Katie Fricas, Carlo Quispe, Abby Denson, Ivan Velez, Jr. and Jennifer Camper. From left to right, front row, are L. Nichols, Sasha Hedges Steinberg and Laurel Lynn Leake.

The 1990s saw the creation of a number of independent publishing houses with output that competed with the giants of mainstream comics publishing, Marvel and DC. The companies included Malibu Comics, Image Comics (such as Hisao and Guilliame from Morning Glories) IDW Publishing, and later, Dark Horse Comics. These companies gave greater artistic freedom to their writers and artists and chose not to ascribe to the Comics Code, allowing exploration of more mature themes. As a result, comics from these companies included a greater relative number of LGBT characters and storylines than their more traditional competitors. LGBT superhero characters include Spectral and Turbo Charge (from Malibu comics), and Gen^{13}'s Sarah Rainmaker (created by Wildstorm for Image Comics before being taken over by DC). Colleen Doran's A Distant Soil, dating back to the black-and-white independent movement of the 1980s, and published by Image since 1996, featured openly gay characters as the romantic leads that gained the series a Gaylactic Spectrum Award nomination.

Dark Horse's Buffy the Vampire Slayer-related comics feature the lesbian characters of Willow, Tara and Kennedy and the closeted character Andrew from the television series. The Buffy Season Eight comics attracted media attention when the title character has a one-night stand with another girl who had fallen in love with her. (Note: Buffy Season Eight #12 (March 2008) and #15 (June 2008)) The encounter was repeated, but both the character and the creators denied that this made Buffy gay, with Joss Whedon saying: "We're not going to make her gay, nor are we going to take the next 50 issues explaining that she's not. She's young and experimenting, and did I mention open-minded?"

X-O Manowar, a superhero title written by Jim Shooter and published by Valiant Comics in 1992, featured a character named Ken Clarkson, who became one of the first gay sidekicks in comic book history.

== Mainstream European comics ==
Comics from continental Europe have been described as having a greater range of "themes, narratives and forms of visual impact" than English-language comics, but have been superseded in popularity by American comics since the mid-1980s, with only French comics matching the popularity of Japanese and American comics. The lack of a "comics code" equivalent to the US system has made the incorporation of LGBT themes less controversial. This is exemplified by the Kelly Green graphic novels (1982–93), created by Stan Drake and Leonard Starr. Drake and Starr are American cartoonists who chose to publish in France, where they would not be limited by US censorship and "could write and draw anything they wanted"; this included episodes in which the vigilante title character dresses as a boy to lure a gay villain into an ambush, and a stereotypically gay secondary character who ran a strip-club.

=== French and Belgian comics ===
At the beginning of the 20th century, Franco-Belgain comics, also known as bandes dessinées, were regarded as a medium for children – this restricted their inclusion of adult and sexual themes, and lasted until at least the 1960s. However, early Franco-Belgian comics for children such as The Adventures of Tintin, Asterix, and The Adventures of Alix have also had sexual and LGBT subtext inferred by readers. Readers of Tintin books have speculated about his sexuality, leading to Marcel Wilmet, spokesperson of Studios Hergé, saying that Tintin is macho and not homosexual; Tintin has many male friends, but they are not boyfriends. The Adventures of Alix comics by Jacques Martin are amongst the most prominent historical comics, and the text concerns the restoration of a moral order, but with a "homosexual subtext that may have been invisible to the original readers", which includes the portrayal of a close relationship between Alix and his companion Enak and the full frontal depiction of teenage male bodies. Martin has disputed any gay readings of the central friendship in the books, but an article in Le Palace still called the "heroes homosexuel de notre enfance".

Strips in the 1960s strove to break taboos, but were still censored by a law passed in 1949 that assumed comics were for children, which prevented the inclusion of explicit sexual themes, as in Barbarella album (1964), which had to be redrawn to remove nudity. The late 1960s saw greater acceptance of comic strips as a mature artform, and their use as social commentary and satire was established in mainstream newspapers by the 1970s, although some anthologies continued to be banned as "pornographic".

The works of French comic book creator Fabrice Neaud have been described as the "most ambitious autobiographical comics project yet published". These include his 1994 series Ego Comme X and the ongoing Journal, of which Neaud has self-published one volume every other year since 1996. The works chronicle day to day experiences and place them in a framework that examines representation and self-identity of sexual-minorities and the creative process. Volumes one and three focus on the author's homosexuality and status as a struggling gay artist in French small-town life: One story arc covered Neaud's unrequited love for a male friend. Neaud's works have been pointed to as examples that legitimised comics as serious literature, and elevated the regard for autobiographical works within comics. The retrospective and subjective nature of the works leads to significant emotional events being afforded greater coverage, with the result that issues of sexuality and interactions between the author and other men are highlighted, reflecting the importance of sexuality to identity. This has led critic (and character) Dominque Goblet to dismiss the works as trivial; such criticisms have been attributed to bias against autobiography or comics, or inability to identify with a gay character.

Frank Margerin's most famous strips follow the lives of working class heterosexual men centered around the character of "suburban rocker" Lucien, and occasionally feature LGBT themes that show the characters' assumptions of stereotypes. In Votez Rocky, the characters dress as the Village People and when a stereotypically gay character tries to chat-up Lucien in Le Retour (1993), he remains oblivious to the attempt. These occurrences have been noted to be about reaffirming their masculinity by comparison with non-masculine gay stereotypes, rather than depictions of homophobia. The relationship between social class and sexual orientation is also explored when a character is arrested by vice police in a park along with a number of gay couples and is humiliated by the police officers homophobic insults. In Comme s'il en Pleuvait (2001), the same character finds that the assumption that he is gay, due to a close male friendship, is to his benefit when in fashionable literary groups, where he is seen as more interesting and trendy.

=== Spanish comics ===
Spanish comics have been described as less conventional and more diverse than American comics. Anarcoma, by creator Nazario Luque, is a "bizarre noir thriller" starring a gay transvestite detective. Anarcoma has been "widely celebrated" as one of the foremost subversive and countercultural comics that challenges preconceptions of sexuality and gender. Luque is openly gay and also writes the underground comic El Vibora. However, Gema Pérez-Sánchez says that the subversive impact of underground comics is less than one might expect, in comparison to mainstream and government-subsidised comics, as the readers of underground comics are unlikely to be shocked. The "veiled" queer content that appears in the Socialist government-sanctioned Madriz has a greater impact.

=== German comics ===
In Germany, the openly gay cartoonist Ralf König has created several popular comics taking an ironic but affectionate view on both gay and straight relationships. In 1979 he began creating comic strips that appeared in the Munich underground magazine Zomix and the gay periodical Rosa Flieder. In 1981, his first comics Sarius, Das sensationelle Comic-Book and SchwulComix (GayComix) were published by Verlag Rosa Winkel in Berlin. In 1987 he wrote his first comic with a continuous story (Kondom des Grauens). These comics have a large gay fan base, and despite initial skepticism from broader comics audiences due to the work's consistent "gay culture" setting, have also gained great popularity among heterosexual readers. Several of König's comics have been adapted into films; his work has sold more than 5 million copies and been translated into 14 languages.

=== British comics ===
British comics were for significant parts of the 20th century regarded as being aimed at children, hence avoiding adult themes. One exception is 2000 AD, a more mature and violent comic book. 2000 AD introduced its first openly gay hero in 1992 in the story Swimming in Blood, in the form of the camp vampire exorcist Devlin Waugh. Waugh was created by writer John Smith and artist Sean Phillips and his character's homosexuality is frequently referenced in the strip; in his first story he attempts to seduce one of the men he is rescuing. The character was deliberately created in opposition to such characters as Judge Dredd and Johnny Alpha, gruff, macho men. Waugh, by contrast, was camp, flippant and flamboyant. In the annual poll of readers' opinions, Waugh became the first and last character ever to knock Judge Dredd off the top spot as Favourite Strip. However, the character was not used for seven years after his initial introduction, due to production problems. In the British small press Martin Eden launched Spandex, which claimed to be "the world's first all-gay superhero team".

== Mainstream Japanese comics ==
Comics are an established art form in Japan, which has the biggest comic book industry in the world. Comics are respected and aimed at both child and adult audiences. Sex and violence are common, and their presence in fictional manga is regarded as a "safety valve".

=== Yaoi and yuri ===
Yaoi and yuri (also known as "boys' love" and "girls' love", respectively) are Japanese genres incorporating homosexual romance themes across various media. The genres emerged in the 1970s in a branch of manga aimed at girls. Yaoi and yuri have spread beyond Japan: both translated and original yaoi and yuri are now available in many countries and languages. The characters in yaoi and yuri manga do not tend to self-identify as homosexual or bisexual. Famous works include Hi Izuru Tokoro no Tenshi (Emperor of the Land of the Rising Sun), an 11-volume series beginning in 1980 that reinterprets the life of the introducer of Buddhism to Japan; and Kaze to Ki no Uta (Poem of the Wind and the Trees), a 17-volume series beginning in 1976 that chronicles the relationship between two schoolboys in France.

As with much manga and anime, science fiction and fantasy tropes and environments are common: Ai no Kusabi, a 1980s yaoi light novel series described as a "magnum opus" of the Boys Love genre, involves a science fictional caste system. Simoun has been described as "a wonderful sci fi series" which does not have to rely on its yuri content to appeal to the audience. The various terminologies for both male/male pairings and female/female pairings are sometimes used to denote the level of sexual explicitness or romanticism in a work. Although yuri originated in female-targeted works, today it is featured in male-targeted ones as well.

Yaoi has been criticised for stereotypical and homophobic portrayals of its characters, and for failing to address gay issues. Homophobia, when it is presented as an issue at all, is often used as a plot device to "heighten the drama", or to show the purity of the leads' love. Rachel Thorn has suggested that as yaoi is a romance narrative, strong political themes may be a "turn off" to the readers. Critics state that the genre challenges heteronormativity via the "queer" bishōnen ("beautiful boys"), and Andrew Grossman has written that the Japanese are more comfortable with writing about LGBT themes in a manga setting, in which gender is often blurred, even in "straight" manga.

=== Bara and "gay comics" ===
There also exists "gay manga" (called Bara (rose)) specifically targeted at gay men, with gay characters. Yaoi writers and fans distinguish these "gay manga" from yaoi, sometimes calling it "bara". Prior to the early 2000s, the primary venue for publication of gay men's manga was gay men's general-interest magazines, which have included manga since the inception of Barazoku in 1971. The typical manga story in these magazines is an 8–24 page one-shot, although some magazines, notably G-men, also carry some serialized stories. McLelland, surveying gay men's magazines from the mid to late 1990s, indicates that most manga stories were simply pornographic, with little attention to character or plot, and that even the longer, serialized stories were generally "thinly developed". McLelland characterizes Barazoku as containing "some well-crafted stories which might be better described as erotic rather than pornographic", while the manga in G-men were "more relentlessly sexual", with less attention to characterization and mood.

The 1990s saw increased media focus on LGBT people in Japan, and a large increase in the production of such works written by gay men. Gengoroh Tagame has been called the most influential creator of gay manga in Japan to date. Most of his work first appeared in gay magazines and usually feature sexual abuse. Much of Gengoroh Tagame's early work was published in the magazine G-men, which was founded in 1994 to cater to gay men who preferred "macho fantasy", as opposed to the sleeker, yaoi-inspired styles popular in the 1980s. Like most gay men's general-interest magazines, G-men included manga as well as prose stories and editorial and photographic material. G-men encouraged steady readership by presenting a better-defined fantasy image, and with serialized, continuing manga stories which encouraged purchase of every issue. Tagame's depiction of men as muscular and hairy has been cited as a catalyst for a shift in fashion amongst gay men in 1995, away from the clean-shaven and slender stereotypes of Yaoi and towards a tendency for masculinity and chubbiness. Tagame's work has been criticised by notable gay manga writer Susumu Hirosegawa for its lack of complex storylines. Susumu Hirosegawa's early works were yaoi, but later Hirosegawa moved into gay manga. Hirosegawa's works sometimes contain no sex at all, with greater focus on plot, but when sex is present it is often in the form of sadomasochism or rape, in which the victim learns to enjoy the experience. Bara manga's popularity has continued to increase, with four major publishers of bara manga anthologies in today's Japan.

=== Other genres ===
Pornographic manga and anime for men, frequently called hentai in the West, often contains depictions of lesbianism for the titillation of male readers, examples being Demon Beast Invasion (1994) and Twin Angels (1995). Futanari are common character types in hentai; they are transgender or intersex figures, often female, with penises.

Mainstream, non-pornographic manga also frequently contains explorations of gender and sex roles, although usually for purposes of exoticism or comedy rather than in a realistic manner. Some supporting characters cross-dress, such as Nuriko from Fushigi Yûgi, and some series are centred around the idea of changing sex, such as Ranma ½, whose protagonist changes sex, but not gender, when splashed with cold water. IS, a manga about two intersexual characters, won the 2007 Kodansha Manga Award in the girls' manga division. Class S is a genre of girl's fiction that tells stories about crushes between a female upperclassman and an underclassman. Maria-sama ga Miteru, a contemporary series which includes a manga adaptation, has been described as a revival of the Class S genre.

== Fandom and awards ==
As the visibility of LGBT comic book creators and characters has increased, comic book fandom has taken notice. Panels discussing LGBT topics occur regularly at comic book and LGBT conventions such as Comicon and Gaylaxicon, and conventions also feature stands dedicated to LGBT comics. Ted Abenheim, event chair of Prism Comics said in 2008, “We're in our sixth year of exhibiting at Comic-Con, presenting a larger booth and more panels and events than ever before.” A number of websites dedicated to LGBT comic book fandom and featuring content from staff writers exist, such as Prismcomics.org, Pinkkrytonite.com and Gayleague.com.

The first GLAAD Award for Best Comic Book was awarded in 1992 (to DC's The Flash). Since then, a number of GLAAD awards have been awarded to mainstream titles, including for DC's Green Lantern and The Authority titles, and Marvel's Young Avengers. According to Paul Lopez, LGBT fans and creators have "debated whether the awards for mainstream comics were more about media hype than the actual content of the comic's stories."

The Gaylactic Spectrum Awards are given to works of science fiction, fantasy or horror, and their "Other Works" category allows nomination of comic book series or individual issues. Comic book winners include issues of DC's Green Lantern, The Authority and Gotham Central, and nominations have been given to titles from Marvel (X-Force, X-Statix), Dark Horse (Buffy Season 8) and Image Comics.

The Lambda Literary Foundation, recognizing notable literature for LGBT themes with their "Lammys" awards since 1988, created a new category in 2014 for graphic works.

Prism Comics, an organization formed in 2003 for promoting LGBTQ themes in comic books, has provided the "Queer Press Grant" for comic book creators since 2005.

== See also ==
- LGBTQ characters in comics
- LGBT themes in speculative fiction
- LGBT themes in anime and manga
- LGBTQ-related comic strips
- LGBTQ-related comics
- List of graphic art works with LGBT characters
- List of LGBT-related webcomics
