= Angela Bocage =

American cartoonist (born 1959)

- Born: 1959 (age 66–67) Fayetteville, Arkansas, U.S.
- Areas: Artist, Editor, Letterer
- Notable works: Real Girl

Angela Bocage (b. 1959) is a bisexual comics creator who published mainly in the 1980s and 1990s. Bocage was active in the queer comics community during these decades, publishing in collections like Gay Comix, Strip AIDS USA, and Wimmen's Comix. Bocage also created, edited, and contributed comics to Real Girl, a comics anthology published by Fantagraphics.

== Biography ==
Bocage was born in Fayetteville, Arkansas. She attended the University of California, Santa Cruz as an art major in the 1970s where she was part of the Graphic Stories Guild with Mark Clegg, another comics artist. The Graphic Stories Guild was a student-run comics club that published issues of student comics for distribution both on an off campus. She published a comic strip called The Worm in the Guild's publication. While at Santa Cruz, Bocage also participated in the creation of fanzines Slug Tesserae and Amoeba Earhart Flyer. Also in college, Bocage created a women's section in the university newspaper.

Bocage worked at a headhunting firm but left in the 1980s to create comics. She also worked as a graphics editor for AIDS News Service, the organization that also published her comic (Nice Girls Don't Talk About) Sex, Religion, and Politics.

Bocage was a key contributor to the feminist comics anthology Wimmen's Comix, contributing stories to every issue from #11 to #17 (1987–1992), and serving as co-editor of issues #12 and #15.

In addition to creating her own comics, Bocage lettered several other comics, including The Trouble with Girls and related titles like Lester Girls and Lizard Lady.

In 1991, Bocage contributed an essay to The Comics Journal titled, "Define the Terms, Dismiss the Dregs, and Enjoy the Results: A Feminist's Case for Pornography."

Bocage eventually went back to school for law and became an immigration attorney based in Boston. She has two children named Robin and Jasmine. She is an activist for reproductive freedom.

== Real Girl ==
Real Girl is a comics anthology published by Fantagraphics that published nine issues in the period 1990 to 1997, all edited by Bocage. Comics in Real Girl highlight themes of gender, sexual orientation, and sex. Along with Bocage's own comics, Real Girl featured works from other comic artists.

Artists featured in Real Girl:

- Issue #1 (Oct. 1990): Donna Barr, Mary Fleener, Robert Triptow, Trina Robbins, Diane Noomin, Terry LaBan, Rebecka Wright, Mario Hernandez, Steve Lafler
- Issue #2 (Aug. 1991): Mario Hernandez, Garret Gaston, Gerard Jones, Marvin Mann, Phoebe Gloeckner, Robert Triptow, Roxxie, Trina Robbins, Michael Botkin, Kate Worley, Reed Waller, Joan Hilty
- Issue #3 (Mar. 1992): Colin Upton, Diane Noomin, Alison Bechdel, Roxxie, Garret Gaston, Kris Kovick, Mario Hernandez, Cheela Smith, Judy Becker
- Issue #4 (Sept. 1992): Peter Kuper, Sabrina Jones, Garret Gaston, Joan Hilty, Julie Frankie, Roxxie, Pete Friedrich, Judy Becker, Cheela Smith
- Issue #5 (Apr. 1993): Joan Hilty, Robert Kirby, Fish, Trina Robbins, Roberta Gregory, Roxxie, Angela Bocage, Cheela Smith, Jennifer Camper, Jaime Hernandez
- Issue #6 (1993): Anne Bernstein, Steve Lafler, Robert Triptow, M.C. Betz, Trina, Leanne Franson, Julie Frankie, Angela Bocage, E. Fitz-Smith, Tom Tomorrow
- Issue #7 (Aug. 1994): Josie Porter, Jayne Lazzeri, Roxxie, Pete Friedrich, Angela Bocage
- Issue #8 (July 1995): Angela Bocage, Seth Tobocman, Roxxie, Trina Robbins
- Issue #9 (1997): Fiona Smyth, Seth Tobocman, Lawrence Van Abbema, Angela Bocage, Trina Robbins, Sandy Spreitz

Issue #7 (Aug. 1994) of Real Girl was a "flip book" that introduced RealTalk, a four-issue comic book series co-edited by Isabella Bannerman, Ann Decker, and Sabrina Jones that was published by Fantagraphics in 1995–1996.

== Bibliography ==
- Choices: A Pro-Choice Benefit Comic Anthology for the National Organization for Women (Angry Isis Press, 1990) — "Civilization As We Know It"
- East Bay Guardian
- Frighten the Horses: A Document of the Sexual Revolution #2 (San Francisco, CA: Heat Seeking Publishing, Summer 1990)
- Gay Comix (Bob Ross):
  - issue #11 (Winter 1987-88) — "Lavendar Booties" (story idea by Robert Triptow)
  - issue #13 (Summer 1991) — "Garden Nymph", "Mission Accomplished" illustrations
- Girljock magazine (Roxxie) — "Major Fun"
- Graphic Babylon: San Diego Comic Con Minicomix 1990 (Grass Valley, CA: Roger May, 1990) — contributor
- Lana's World: A 'zine of Lesbian and Feminist cartoons (c. 1986)
- Lesbian Contradiction #38 (Spring 1992)
- (Nice Girls Don't Talk About) Sex, Religion, and Politics strip created for the Bay Area Reporter
- Open Season: the Mini Comic (Roger May, 1989) — contributor
- Real Girl (Fantagraphics, 1990-1997):
  - issue #5 (April 1993) — “Queer, With Children”
  - issue #6 (1993) — “Sex, Religion, and Politics”
  - issue #7 (Aug. 1994) — “Our Wedding Night”
  - issue #8 (July 1995) — “Schlock Therapy” and “Educating Lance”
  - issue #9 (1997) — “Angry Girls/Aaron Dreams,” “stupid questions/bi-girls,” and “Aaron Becomes Chimerical”
- Renegade Romance #1 (Renegade Press, June 1987) — "So, How Did You Guys Meet?"
- Rip Off Comix (Rip Off Press):
  - issue #16 (1987) — "Trading Futures" — lettering
  - issue #27 (1990) — "Love is the Drug"; republished in Logomotive #2 (Steve Cherwin, 1992)
- Strip AIDS USA (Last Gasp, 1988) — "The Estate Sale" (with R. Von Busack)
- Taboo #9 (Kitchen Sink Press, 1995) — "The Joys of Childhood"
- Weird Smut:
  - issue #3 (John A. Mozzer, 1989) — "A Tropical Delicasy"
  - issue #4 (John A. Mozzer, 1991) — "The Lactation Contest"
- Wimmen's Comix:
  - issue #11 (Renegade Press, Apr. 1987) — "Accessory Dos & Don'ts" (with co-writer Rebecka Wright)
  - issue #12 (Renegade Press, Nov. 1987) — co-editor with Rebecka Wright, artist of “Wild Heat” and "Why We Do It"
  - issue #13 (Renegade Press, 1988) — artist of “Features”
  - issue #14 (Rip Off Press, 1989) — back cover artist and artist of “On The Edge” (story by Deni Loubert) and "New Age, Same Old Shit!"
  - issue #15 (Rip Off Press, 1989) — co-editor with Phoebe Gloeckner; "Kartoon Girl" and "Latency Come Lately"
  - issue #16 (Rip Off Press, 1990) — “Rust Belt Romance” and “Sons and Lovers”
  - issue #17 (Rip Off Press, 1992) — “Prickophobia”
- Women's Glibber: State-of-the-Art Women's Humor, edited by Roz Warren (Crossing Press, 1992) ISBN 978-0895945488 — contributor
