= M. J. Goldberg =

Cartoonist

Michael J. Goldberg was an alternative cartoonist known for the exploration of gay themes in his comics. His work was included in Gay Comix.

== Career ==
In 1981, Goldberg published his debut comic strip Clonederella to the Bay Area Reporter. He entered into the realm of Gay Comix after befriending Robert Triptow. He was in 11 out of 25 issues of Gay Comix. Goldberg would also appear in Strip AIDS U.S.A. and Meatmen.

== Contributions ==
- "Clonederella", Bay Area Reporter
- "It's Attitude", Gay Comix, no. 5
- "The Elves and the Leathermaker" Gay Comix, no. 6
- "Swishy Fishy in Love Bait", Gay Comix, no. 7
- "Swishy Fishy Meets the Caped Cod", Gay Comix, no. 8
- "Swishy Fishy Fashion Cutout", Gay Comix, no. 10
- "Wee Wee's Gayhouse", Gay Comix, no. 11
- "The All-Unkind", Gay Comix, no. 12
- "Our Love Was Too Cosmic" and "Acquired Pronoun Deficiency Syndrome", Gay Comix, no. 13
- "Castro Street 2000", Gay Comix, no. 14
- Gay Comix, no. 22
- Gay Comix, no. 25
- Meatmen, no. 1
- Meatmen, no. 2
- Meatmen, no. 4
- Meatmen, no. 5
- Meatmen, no. 6
- Meatmen, no. 8
- Meatmen, no. 9
- Meatmen, no. 10
- "Worrywort and Nevermind" Strip AIDS U.S.A.
