= Strip AIDS =

Comics anthologies to raise funds for the care of people with AIDS

Strip AIDS and Strip AIDS U.S.A. are comics anthology volumes published in 1987 in the UK, and 1988 in the US (respectively). They combined short comics with educational and sometimes comedic themes, to educate readers about HIV disease and safer sex, and to raise funds for the care of people with AIDS.

== Strip AIDS ==
Strip AIDS
- cover
- Editor: Don Melia
- Language: English
- Genre: Graphic novel
- Published: 1987
- Publication place: United Kingdom
- Pages: 56
- ISBN: 978-0951252208

Strip AIDS was edited by Don Melia, and published by Willyprods/Small Time Ink. Proceeds of the project went to London Lighthouse, England's first residential and day-care facility for people with AIDS. It was 56 pages. The book was released in conjunction with an art exhibition in London, which brought the number of artists involved to nearly 90.

Contributors include Steven Appleby, Bill Belcher, Steve Bell, Mark Buckingham, Daniel Clowes, Richard Coles, Alan Davis, Kim Deitch, Frank Dickens, Hunt Emerson, Melinda Gebbie, Dave Gibbons, David Hine, Rian Hughes, Gray Joliffe, Raymond Jackson, Nick Kamen, Larry Marder, Jay Lynch, Peter Milligan, Alan Moore, Kevin O'Neill, David Shenton, Bill Sienkiewicz, Posy Simmonds, Spitting Image, Richard Starkings, and Skip Williamson.

== Strip AIDS U.S.A. ==
Strip AIDS U.S.A.
- cover
- Editor: Trina Robbins, Bill Sienkiewicz, Robert Triptow
- Language: English
- Genre: Graphic novel
- Published: 1988
- Publication place: United States
- Pages: 136
- ISBN: 978-0867193732

The development of Strip AIDS U.S.A. was inspired by Strip AIDS. It was initiated by Trina Robbins, who co-edited it with Bill Sienkiewicz and Robert Triptow. It was published by Last Gasp. Proceeds from the sale of the book went to the Shanti Project, a San-Francisco-based agency serving people with AIDS. It was 136 pages.

The contributors were a mixture of mainstream superhero comics creators, influential independent cartoonists, and lesser-known lesbian and gay cartoonists, and consisted of what one reviewer called "one of the most impressive lineups of talent I've ever seen". The most noteworthy include:

- Sergio Aragonés
- Terry Austin
- Tim Barela
- Alison Bechdel
- Bob Boze Bell
- Bruce Billings
- Angela Bocage
- Joyce Brabner
- Norm Breyfogle
- Bob Burden
- Jennifer Camper
- D. G. Chichester
- Amanda Conner
- Howard Cruse
- Geoff Darrow
- Gerard Donelan
- Colleen Doran
- Harry Driggs
- Will Eisner
- Kurt Erichsen
- Mark Evanier
- Leslie Ewing
- Jules Feiffer
- Bob Fingerman
- Mary Fleener
- Keith Giffen
- Michael J. Goldberg
- Roberta Gregory
- Bill Griffith
- Peter Gross
- Bo and Scott Hampton
- Los Bros Hernandez
- Nicole Hollander
- Klaus Janson
- Jeffrey A. Krell
- Kathryn LeMieux
- Steve Leialoha
- William Messner-Loebs
- Paul Mavrides
- Ted McKeever
- Frank Miller
- Jerry Mills
- Moebius
- Brad Parker
- Harvey Pekar
- Spain Rodriguez
- Arn Saba
- Tim Sale
- Joe Sinardi
- Jan Strnad
- Jill Thompson
- Tom Tomorrow
- Garry Trudeau
- Carol Tyler
- Vaughn
- Reed Waller
- Lee Weeks
- S. Clay Wilson
- Kate Worley
- Tom Yeates
