= Robert Triptow =

American writer & artist (born 1952)

- Born: Robert James Triptow; May 10, 1952 (age 74) Salt Lake City, Utah, U.S.
- Areas: Cartoonist, Editor
- Notable works: Gay Comix
- Awards: Lambda Award for Humor, 1990; Special Achievement Award, San Diego Comic Con, 1989
- Spouse: William Blakely

Robert Triptow (born May 10, 1952 in Salt Lake City, Utah) is an American writer and artist. He is known primarily for creating gay- and bisexual-themed comics and for editing Gay Comix in the 1980s, and he was identified by underground comix pioneer Lee Marrs as "the last of the underground cartoonists."

== Career ==
A long-time resident of San Francisco, Robert Triptow was one of the earliest contributors to Kitchen Sink Press' anthology Gay Comix, beginning with issue #2. He succeeded Howard Cruse as editor of the series, editing issues #5 through #13 (1984–1991). During this time he edited the 1989 anthology Gay Comics, one of the earliest histories of the subject, which won the first Lambda Literary Award for Humor. He also co-edited and contributed to the HIV-research fund-raising and educational anthology Strip AIDS U.S.A. (1988) with Trina Robbins & Bill Sienkiewicz.

As a journalist, Triptow has contributed to The Advocate, The Bay Area Reporter, Frontiers, The San Francisco Sentinel, and other West Coast LGBT publications.

In 1978, as the assistant to the publisher of The Advocate, David B. Goodstein, Triptow was close to the heart of the historic events “during the year of Harvey Milk.”

Triptow received his title as "the last of the underground cartoonists" at WonderCon when asked whether he considered Gay Comix to be alternative or underground. Lee Marrs, standing witness to the question, asked Triptow if he starved while living in the Haight-Ashbury district of San Francisco, to which he answered yes. It was then that Marrs coined his title. This conversation was filmed and circulated widely via the internet.

In 2009, Triptow announced his plans to relaunch Gay Comics as a series of trade paperbacks under a new publisher, hoping to begin gathering comics for the collection by the end of the year. These plans were confirmed by Triptow in 2013, adding that he wants it serve as "a platform for all the queer cartoonists," however, no such series has reached publication yet.

In 2015, he released Class Photo, which has been described as a wryly comedic graphic novel imagining short biographies for the individuals depicted in a 1937 school group photograph.

== Personal life ==
Born and raised in Salt Lake City, Utah, Robert Triptow considers himself a "late bloomer" in the gay community as he did not come out until his mid-20s. Triptow had no exposure to alternative cartooning until a junior high journalism field trip to Brigham Young University, where he discovered the works of cartoonists Jules Feiffer, Gilbert Shelton, and R. Crumb in the school's book store. This prompted him to begin cartooning, creating a rift between him and his conservative parents as they deemed the nature of his queer-themed comics pornographic and sinful. Triptow commonly references his home state's dense Mormon population, noting he was often considered an outsider as a non-Mormon in Utah. Triptow broke away from his family in 1971, the same year he found the photograph which inspired Class Photo.

Triptow moved from Salt Lake City to San Francisco on Halloween of 1977.

He is married to William Blakely.

== Notable works ==
=== Strip AIDS U.S.A. ===
Robert Triptow became involved in Strip AIDS U.S.A. (1988) when invited onto the fundraiser as co-editor by Trina Robbins, who felt unable to complete the project by herself as a heterosexual. Triptow then brought other cartoonists from Gay Comics onto the team, resulting in 136 pages contributed by over 50 different artists.

Triptow's two-page comic titled "Needs" appears in the last half of Strip AIDS U.S.A between "The Quilt" by Donelan and an untitled comic by Sharon Rudahl. Triptow considers his piece one of few in the compilation to portray an individual living with AIDS. The comic features a man named Joe with a male suitor whom he romantically declines on multiple occasions until the end when the two are shown together as Joe is dying of AIDS. The comic has a dedication written underneath the last panel which reads, “for Peter, Mickey, Spig & Rig, John, Steve, Vince, Joah, Raven, Tom, Hippler, and too many others.” In 2008 only one of the individuals listed in this dedication was still alive, according to Triptow.

=== Class Photo ===
Class Photo (2015) is Robert Triptow's first solo book venture. The comic consists of illustrated, fictionalized outcomes of each individual posing for a black and white 1937 class photograph labeled "Public School 49" from Brooklyn, New York, which Triptow found with his uncle as college students under a pile of garbage in their hometown of Salt Lake City. Triptow kept the photo, hanging it on a wall in his home to laugh at with house-guests for over 20 years. In 2009 a cancer diagnosis motivated Triptow to finalize the project and proceed with publication.

== Bibliography ==
=== Books ===
- Gay Comics (ed.). Introduction: "Art + Humor = Liberation." New York: Plume; New American Library, 1989. 120p. ISBN 0-452-26229-1
- Strip AIDS U.S.A.: A Collection of Cartoon Art to Benefit People With AIDS. (ed. with Trina Robbins & Bill Sienkiewicz). San Francisco: Last Gasp, 1988. ISBN 978-0-86719-373-2
- Class Photo. Seattle: Fantagraphics, 2015. 64p. ISBN 978-1-60699-886-1

=== Contributions ===
In addition to Gay Comix, his cartoon work has appeared in:

- Robbins, Trina, editor (2023) Won't Back Down, Last Gasp. ISBN 978-0-86719-925-3.
- Robbins, Trina (2017) A minyen Yidn (un andere zakhn) = A bunch of Jews (and other stuff), Bedside Press. ISBN 978-0-9939970-5-1.
- Kirby, Robert, editor (2016) The Shirley Jackson Project: Comics Inspired by Her Life and Work, Ninth Art Press. ISBN 978-0-9903433-6-3.
- Kirby, Robert and David Kelly, editors, (2008) The Book of Boy Trouble 2: Born to Trouble, Green Candy Press. ISBN 1-931160-65-1.
- Camper, Jennifer, editor (2007) Juicy Mother 2: How They Met, Manic D Press. ISBN 978-1-933149-20-2
- Camper, Jennifer, editor (2005) Juicy Mother Soft Skull Press. ISBN 1-932360-70-0
- Gregory, Roberta (2004), Naughty Bits #40, Fantagraphics.
- Gregory, Roberta (1999), Naughty Bits #28, Fantagraphics.
- Gregory, Roberta (1998), Naughty Bits #27, Fantagraphics.
- Kinney, Jay, editor (1993), Young Lust #8, Last Gasp, ISBN 0-86719-253-4.
- Bocage, Angela (1993), Real Girl #6, Fantagraphics, ASIN B000IQUH6S.
- Bocage, Angela (1991), Real Girl #2, Fantagraphics.
- Bocage, Angela (1990), Real Girl #1, Fantagraphics, ASIN B000KSA71O.
- Robbins, Trina, editor (1990), Choices: a pro-choice benefit comic anthology for the National Organization for Women, Angry Isis Press, ASIN: B002E5WBKG.
- Leyland, Winston (1986), Meatmen #1, G. S. Press.
- Kitchen, Denis, editor (1984), Bizarre Sex #4, Kitchen Sink Press [5th printing]

== Awards ==
- The first Lambda Literary Award for Humor, in 1990, for the 1989 anthology Gay Comics.
- Special Achievement Award from San Diego Comic-Con in 1989 for Strip AIDS U.S.A.
