= Jerry Mills =

American cartoonist

- Jerry Mills in 1986
- Born: Jerry A. Mills; February 26, 1951
- Died: January 28, 1993 (aged 41)
- Area: Cartoonist
- Notable works: "Poppers"

Jerry A. Mills (February 26, 1951 - January 28, 1993) was an openly gay cartoonist known for his comic strip Poppers, which is credited as one of the first comic strips to develop multi-dimensional gay characters. Scholars have stated that while earlier comics had relied on stereotypes such as the nelly queen or muscleman, Mills presented his characters with lives beyond the stereotypes. His work is also credited as having helped shape comics for the LGBTQ+ community and its members.

== Career ==
Mills worked in the gay press, where he became a beloved cartoonist, and he later became involved in social activism. In the earlier part of the 1980s, Mills worked in the subscriptions department of In Touch for Men, an adult magazine company aimed at gay men. John Calendo, the magazine's editor and friend of Mills, encouraged the artist to develop a regular comic strip in the magazine. The two intended for the strip to add variety to the regularly scheduled comic content, to which Mills created Poppers. The strip's title refers to "poppers", alkyl nitrites which were commonly used recreationally in the gay community. Mills began writing the series in 1982 and by the mid 1980s a translated edition of the strip was published in Gai Pied Hebdo, a French-language gay magazine, and in the Japanese magazine Barazoku. Reprints of the strip also appeared sporadically in Gay Comix under the editorship of Howard Cruse, Robert Triptow, and Andy Mangels. The ninth issue of Gay Comix was focused solely on Mills's Poppers strips.

Poppers was lauded for having complex characters who were more than gay stereotypes. Poppers focused on Billy, a West Hollywood muscleboy, and his sidekick Yves (based on Mills), a big-hearted nebbish who offered good advice and caution (usually unheeded) for his glamorous friend. Yves always went along for the ride with Billy, commenting on the action, a function he took over from a witty crab louse that lived on Billy's pubic hair in the first few strips.

Mills was also a frequent cartoonist to the Meatmen gay male comics series in the beginning of its run and wrote an eight-page history of gays in comics for the first Meatmen anthology.

When Mills moved to the classifieds department of Advocate Men, Poppers also moved to Advocate Men and was published sporadically. By the beginning of the 1990s Mills' health was deteriorating, as he developed complications associated with HIV infection, and in his final few years he worked less and less. He did, however, attend ACT UP demonstrations in Los Angeles and design posters for the offshoot organization Queer Nation, concerned with gay visibility. After his death, a March 1993 ACT UP protest at Amgen Corporation was dedicated to Richard Iosty and Mills, both active ACT UP LA members who had recently died.

Though overshadowed by contemporaries such as Tim Barela and Howard Cruse, both of whom also worked with continuing characters in comic strip format, scholars have stated that Mills made a substantial contribution to gay cartooning. In particular, the "Chelsea Boys" strip by Glen Hanson and Allan Neuwirth is influenced by Mills.

== AIDS themes ==
As the AIDS crisis emerged, Mills' work struggled with conflicting themes of humorously depicting casual sex with the promotion of safer sex to reduce the spread of the disease. In his work Mills focused heavily on the AIDS crisis, as mass-produced comic books such as Meatmen allowed for a larger audience and greater exposure to the epidemic's social issues. Critics have argued that by doing this, Mills was able to make comics a more educational based literary art, rather than a plain read.

== Personal life and death ==
Mills was openly gay and in his later years had a partner, Sal Lucarello. During the 1990s Mills's health was steadily deteriorating due to severe complications associated with HIV, causing him to work less and less. He remained active with social issues and was able to attend the 'ACT UP' demonstrations in Los Angeles, California. He also designed posters for Queer Nation, an activist organization aimed at protecting those who felt threatened by anti-gay violence.

Mills died of AIDS complications on January 28, 1993.

== Comics ==
- Gay Comix: issues 4-6, 8-9, 25
- Meatmen: issues 1-3, 5-10, 13
- Gai Pied Hebdo (in French)
