= Donelan (cartoonist) =

American cartoonist

- Cover of Drawing on the Gay Experience by Gerard P. Donelan
- Born: Gerard P. Donelan; 1949 (age 76–77) Jamaica Plain, Boston, Massachusetts, USA
- Area: Cartoonist
- Pseudonym: Donelan
- Notable works: "It's a Gay Life"; "Drawing on the Gay Experience"; "Donelan's Back"
- Spouse: Christopher McKenna (m. 2015; died 2022)

Gerard P. Donelan (born 1949), known mononymously as Donelan (IPA: dɔnəlɛn), is a gay cartoonist. Part of the first wave of LGBT cartoonists, he drew It's a Gay Life, a regular gag cartoon feature in The Advocate, for 15 years.

== Early life and education ==
Donelan was born in Jamaica Plain, a neighborhood in Boston, but grew up in Plymouth, Massachusetts, the son of advertising artist Paul Donelan. He graduated from Plymouth Carver Regional High School in 1967. He studied art at Southeastern Massachusetts Technological Institute but did not finish the degree and went to work in retail.

== Career ==
In 1977, disappointed that Joe Johnson's pioneering gay comic strips Miss Thing and Big Dick had ended their run in The Advocate, Donelan submitted 29 cartoons to the publication, which turned into a long-running series of his own. It's a Gay Life gently lampooned the Castro clone culture of the time, focusing primarily on young and middle-aged gay men's daily lives. He continued to work in retail while producing the series, which also yielded two paperback reprints: Drawing on the Gay Experience (1987) and Donelan's Back (1988).

For eight years, Donelan also created sexually explicit comics in color for Advocate Men, an erotica sister publication of The Advocate. His work has appeared in Drummer, Frontiers, Gunner, Gay Comix, and Meatmen.

Donelan's art was produced in seven countries and five languages. His work has appeared on t-shirts, rubber stamps, calendars, greeting cards, and in the National Baseball Hall of Fame and Museum.

Donelan created cartoons, pamphlets, and posters to educate the gay community about the importance of safe sex practices and the threat of AIDS. He did this work for the NAMES Project.

In May 2015, he was a featured panelist at the first Queers & Comics conference, as one of the "Pioneers of Queer Men's Comics". The Leather Archives & Museum holds a selection of his work.

== Personal life ==
Donelan met and began dating Christopher McKenna in May 1979. They married in 2013, having waited until their marriage would be federally recognized in the US. After spending most of their lives together living in San Francisco, the couple eventually moved back to Donelan's hometown of Plymouth, Massachusetts, after his mother died in 2004. McKenna died in 2022.

== Contributions ==
- "Donelan" from Strip AIDS U.S.A.
- "The Quilt" from Strip AIDS U.S.A.
- Cover of Gay Comix #7 (colored by Robert Triptow)
- "Night Moves" from Gay Comix #7
- "The Discussion Group" from Gay Comix #7
- "A Donelan Look at Women" from Gay Comix #10
- "A Donelan Look at Men" from Gay Comix #10
- "Blip..." from Gay Comix #25
- Untitled from No Straight Lines
- Untitled from Meatmen #1
- "Interrupted Transmission" from Meatmen #2
- Back cover of Meatmen #2
- It's a Gay Life from The Advocate (1977-1992)

== See also ==
- LGBTQ themes in comics
- List of graphic art works with LGBTQ characters
- List of comics creators
- List of American comics creators
