= Burton Clarke =

Alternative cartoonist

Burton Clarke is a gay African-American alternative cartoonist. He is known for his contributions to the rise of LGBT comics and his focus on representing gay men of all races and classes in his art, using a mix of realism and fantasy to tackle complex issues such as internalized racism and homophobia.

== Personal life ==
Clarke was born in Plainfield, NJ. He received his Bachelor's in theatre from Syracuse University and his Master's in acting from Florida State University.

After four years at Sarasota's Asolo State Theatre, Clarke moved to New York. Due to the difficulty of finding steady work as a black actor, he eventually decided to fall back on his skills as a cartoonist, pursuing a personal interest in broadening gay representation in media.

== Career ==
Clarke's comic "Cy Ross and the SQ Syndrome" was published first in the New York Native (1980), then re-printed in Gay Comix #2 (1981), and in Meatmen Vol.1 (1986). He contributed cover art to Gay Comix #3, and another comic, "The Satyr", to Gay Gomix #10. He was also known for publications in the Playguy, First Hand, and Christopher Street magazine.

Clarke has said that his own style is influenced by that of Leonard Star.

=== Reception ===
Clarke is known for the realism and detail of his art style, his radical use of heavy shading/lighting in black-and-white comics, and for tackling sensitive issues such as the intersection of race and sexuality, as well as internalized racism and homophobia. In "Cy Ross and the SQ Syndrome" he confronts the internalized racism which comes with being a "snow queen", while "The Satyr" confronts the ways in which internalized homophobia can lead to violence. His work has been recognized for the importance and rarity of its subject matter at the time, as well as its use in discussions about pornographic content and government funding for AIDS research.

Jerry Mills and Howard Cruse both expressed an admiration for Clarke's art and a desire to see him be more prolific in his output.

== Activism ==
Clarke is active in AIDS awareness and in 1987 contributed panel art to the GMHC "Safer Sex Comix" project in 1987, an attempt to spread awareness about AIDS and eroticize safe-sex practices such as using condoms.

== Select publications ==
- Cassell, Avery. Resistance: The LGBT Fight Against Fascism in WWII. Ed. Diane Kanzler. Dana Point, CA: Stacked Deck Press, November 16, 2018. ISBN 9780999647226
- The Queer Heroes Coloring Book. Ed. Jon Macy and Tara Madison Avery. Dana Point CA: Stacked Deck Press, July 29, 2016. ISBN 9780997048735
- Estler, Thomas. Abolitionista! Vol. 1. United Graphic LLC: Mattoon, Illinois, 2014. ISBN 9780615754390
- Queer Pin-Ups Card Deck sold by Northwest Press for the May 2015 Queers and Comics LGBTQ Cartoonist Conference in New York
