= Joe Johnson (cartoonist) =

American cartoonist

- Born: Joe Johnson
- Area: Cartoonist
- Notable works: "Miss Thing", "Big Dick"

Joe Johnson was an American gay cartoonist, whose Miss Thing and Big Dick were among the first ongoing gay comics characters, appearing in the late 1960s and early 1970s. The characters were featured in single-panel humor cartoons originally published in The Advocate.

Cover of ...and so, this is YOUR life, MISS THING, featuring Johnson's characters Miss Thing and Big Dick

Miss Thing is an unflappable, stereotypically effeminate, gay "queen"; the name was a popular expression in gay male subculture for such a person. He has a willowy physique and a pompadour hairstyle, and wears floral prints, bell-bottoms, and flamboyant blouses. Big Dick is an outgoing, stereotypically macho gay man. He has a highly muscular physique, and wears tight jeans which emphasize his large penis, a baseball cap, and a leather jacket and boots, in the mold of a Tom of Finland character. Both characters are sexually adventurous, and the cartoons are blatantly sexual with frequent nudity, but not sexually explicit. The characters usually appear separately in cartoons under their respective names, but sometimes meet.

Johnson published a collection of Miss Thing and Big Dick cartoons through Funny Bone Press in 1973 as: ...and so, this is YOUR life, Miss Thing (the title being a reference to the then-recent popular television program This Is Your Life), with an introduction by Larry Townsend. Some of Johnson's cartoons were also reprinted in volumes of Meatmen in the 1980s, as well as in historical overviews such as No Straight Lines published by Fantagraphics in 2012. Johnson also produced explicit erotic illustrations for sale.

Cartoonist Donelan was inspired by Johnson's work to begin his series "It's a Gay Life", which appeared in The Advocate after "Miss Thing" and "Big Dick" ended. Howard Cruse cited Johnson's "brazenly gay" cartooning as an inspiration.
