= Tim Barela =

American cartoonist

- Born: 1954 (age 71–72); Los Angeles, California, U.S.
- Occupation: Cartoonist
- Known for: Gay Comix
- Notable work: Leonard & Larry

Tim Barela (born 1954) is an American gay cartoonist who is best known for his creation of the comic strip Leonard & Larry. The Leonard & Larry strip first appeared in a 1984 issue of Gay Comix, then were later featured in The Advocate and Frontiers magazines. The comic series has been collected in four volumes published by Palliard Press, and a single volume by Rattling Good Yarns.

== Career ==
Born in 1954 in Los Angeles, California, Barela began working as a cartoonist in 1976, producing an untitled comic strip for Cycle News. This led to strips such as "Just Puttin" for Biker magazine (1977-1978), "Short Strokes" for Cycle World (1977-1979), "Hard Tale" for Choppers (1978-1979), "The Adventures of Rickie Racer," "The Adventures of Eric Enchilada," and "The Puttin Gourmet...America's Favorite Low-Life Epicurean" for Biker Lifestyle, and FTW News (1979). In 1980 he developed for possible syndication a comic strip titled "Ozone," which included a gay character named Leonard who had a "roommate" named Larry. The strip was unsuccessful, and he pitched another strip featuring those two characters to LGBT news magazine The Advocate which also turned it down.

Editor Robert Triptow encouraged Barela to develop the Leonard & Larry strip into longer multi-page stories, which was first featured in Gay Comix #5. Following its debut, Leonard & Larry would go on to be featured in Gay Comix #7 in 1986, Gay Comix #10 in 1987, Gay Comics #14 in 1991, as well as its own special issue of Gay Comix dedicated to Leonard & Larry in 1992. The strip was also featured in Strip AIDS USA. A later editor at The Advocate ran the series from 1988 to 1990, after which it was published in rival LGBT news magazine Frontiers for many years. The strip was also part of Out of the Inkwell, a play presented in 1994 by San Francisco's Theatre Rhinoceros.

The Leonard & Larry collection Kurt Cobain & Mozart Are Both Dead was a nominee for the Lambda Literary Award in the Humor category.

== Personal life ==
Barela became a fundamentalist Christian in high school, but began attending a Metropolitan Community Church congregation in 1980.

He is a former avid motorcyclist.

Barela has a passion for Western wear which he describes as his "cowboy fetish". In all of the strips Barela has published, at least one character has appeared in Western garb. Additionally, he considers himself to be part of the Bear community as well as a fan of it.

== Leonard and Larry ==
The Leonard and Larry comic strip was first published in Gay Comix #5 in 1984, and would go on to be featured in Gay Comix #7 in 1986, Gay Comix #10 in 1987, and Gay Comics #14 in 1991, as well as its own special issue of Gay Comix in 1992.

Leonard and Larry has been praised for being comic strip which represents characters of different gender identities, sexual orientations, ages, and sexual preferences as a community. The characters in the comic strip also age over time, as illustrated through graying hair, expanding bald patches, and growing children, which defies the tradition of comic characters appearing to be ageless.

The strip has also received praise for its representations of queer family structures. Incorporating themes of domesticity and unique family structures in the strip sets Leonard & Larry apart from many other gay comic strips from its time.

Leonard & Larry has been noted for Barela's attention to detail, particularly in his renderings of hair and beards. According to Alison Bechdel, "No one renders facial hair like Tim Barela, I always say. He does the most fabulous beards—he seems to draw each individual strand of hair."

== Books ==
Leonard & Larry has been released in four different collections published by Palliard Press, which include:

- Domesticity Isn't Pretty (1993), ISBN 1-884568-00-9
- Kurt Cobain & Mozart Are Both Dead (1996), ISBN 1-884568-04-1
- Excerpts from the Ring Cycle in Royal Albert Hall (2000), ISBN 1-884568-05-X
- How Real Men Do It (2003), ISBN 1884568-06-8

In 2021 Rattling Good Yarns released a compilation of all of the Leonard And Larry strips in both hardback and softcover.

- The Complete Leonard & Larry Collection (2021), ISBN 1-955826-05-6
