= Gay Comix =

Underground comics series

- Gay Comix #1 (September 1980), art by Rand Holmes

Publication information
- Publisher: Kitchen Sink Press (1980–1984); Bob Ross (1985–1998)
- Schedule: Irregular
- Format: anthology
- Publication date: Sept. 1980 – July 1998
- No. of issues: 25
- Editor(s): Howard Cruse, Robert Triptow, Andy Mangels

Gay Comix (later Gay Comics) is an underground comics series published from 1980 to 1998 featuring cartoons by and for gay men and lesbians. The comic books had the tagline "Lesbians and Gay Men Put It On Paper!"

Much of the early content was autobiographical, but more diverse themes were explored in later editions. The contents of Gay Comix were generally about relationships, personal experiences, and humor, rather than sex. It is generally less sexually explicit than the similarly themed (and male-focused) Meatmen series of graphic novels. Its editors each made a deliberate effort to feature work by both women and men.

== Development ==
The idea for Gay Comix came from Denis Kitchen, a publisher of underground comics through the company he founded, Kitchen Sink Press. In 1979, after realizing underground cartoonist Howard Cruse was gay, Kitchen asked him to edit an anthology of gay comic artists. The two had worked together previously; Cruse's comic Barefootz was published through Kitchen Sink Press. A call was put out for artists through comics magazine Cascade Comix Monthly. Gay Comix aimed to get the gay and lesbian contributors to write about things that had happened to them, and experiences they had had. Originally Cruse had reservations about editing the anthology. "He [Cruse] had never publicly, in print, declared he was gay ... he thought coming out would only add to his woes". Cruse decided that "it would be cowardly" to decline the editor position for those reasons.

Cruse recognized that gay people were viewed as caricatures by most of the world, and wanted to publish comics that showed the humanity and normal side of lesbian and gay people. Gay Comix featured the work of primarily gay and lesbian cartoonists. In an editor's note in Gay Comix #4 Cruse put out a call for more women to submit to the magazine, saying, "After all, the personal style of comic book storytelling in Gay Comix was pioneered by the women who put together Wimmen's Comix when underground commix were young." While it sometimes had suggestive or sexual comics, Gay Comix was not a pornographic comic series. Cruse apparently even expressed hope that he wouldn't be submitted to comics that focused heavily on genitals.

== Publication history ==
Kitchen Sink Press published the first five issues of Gay Comix; thereafter it was published by Bob Ross, publisher of the Bay Area Reporter gay newspaper.

The first four issues were edited by Howard Cruse; issues #5 through #13 were edited by Robert Triptow. Andy Mangels edited issues #14 to #25 and a special issue featuring Barela; Mangels changed the title to Gay Comics starting with issue #15, in part to divest it of the "underground" implications of "comix".

Excerpts from Gay Comix were included in a 1989 anthology titled Gay Comics.

== Content ==
Artists producing work for Gay Comix included:

- Mary Wings, creator of the first one-off lesbian book Come Out Comix (1972) and Dyke Shorts (1976)
- Alison Bechdel, who created Dykes to Watch Out For and whose graphic novel Fun Home was adapted into a Tony Award-winning Broadway musical
- Roberta Gregory, who created Dynamite Damsels (1976), the first lesbian underground serial comic book, and the character Bitchy Bitch;
- Jerry Mills, creator of Poppers
- Howard Cruse, editor of the first four issues
- Robert Triptow, editor of issues #5 through 13
- Burton Clarke, creator of Cy Ross and the S.Q. Syndrome, Satyr, and the cover of issue #3
- Jennifer Camper, editor of Juicy Mother
- Tim Barela, creator of Leonard & Larry
- Jon Macy creator of Teleny and Camille
- Lee Marrs and Trina Robbins, two of the original members of the Wimmen's Comix Collective
- Gerard Donelan, creator of It's a Gay Life and cover artist of issue #7
- Diana Green, a notable trans woman cartoonist

Gay Comix #1

Gay Comix #1 was published in September 1980 by Kitchen Sink Press. It was 36 pages long and sold for $1.25. The cover art was by Rand Holmes.

It opened with a note from Howard Cruse:

Each artist speaks for himself or herself. No one speaks for any mythical 'average' homosexual. No one speaks for the Gay Movement. ... In drawing this book, we gay cartoonists would like to affirm that we are here, and that we live lives as strewn with India inked pratfalls, flawed heroics, and surreptitious truths as the rest of the human race.

The cartoonists and stories featured were:

- "Stick in the Mud" by Lee Marrs
- "Reunion" by Roberta Gregory
- "Billy Goes Out" by Howard Cruse
- "When You're in Love, the Whole World is Lavender" by Roberta Gregory

Themes touched on in this issue include coming out and settling down, in "Stick in the Mud". Grief and cruising, in "Billy Goes Out", and hope for a more tolerant future in "When You're in love, the Whole World is Lavender".

Gay Comix #2

Gay Comix #2 was published in November 1981 by Kitchen Sink Press. It was edited by Howard Cruse, who also did the cover art. It had a cover price of $1.50. The cartoons and artists featured were:

- "Jerry Mack" by Howard Cruse
- "Castroids" by Robert Triptow
- "Unnatural Desires!" by Roberta Gregory
- "Getting Domestic" by Howard Cruse
- "For Keeps and Forever" by Lee Marrs

Themes addressed in this issue include domestic partnered life in "Getting Domestic", internalized homophobia in "Jerry Mack", and experimentation in "Unnatural Desires!"

Gay Comix #3

Gay Comix #3 was published in December 1982 by Kitchen Sink Press. It was 44 pages long and had a cover price of $2. Howard Cruse was the editor. The cover art was done by Burton Clark. Gay Comix #3 was the first issue to include notes from its readers. The comics and artists featured in this issue were:

- "My Deadly Darling Dyke" by Lee Mars
- "Weekend Revolutionaries" by Kurt Erichsen
- "Castroids" by Robert Triptow (Two short Castroids comics were featured in this issue.)
- "I'm Me" by David Kottler
- "One for Sorrow" by Patrick Marcel
- "I Always Cry at Movies" by Howard Cruse
- "Necropolitan Life" by Billy Fugate
- "The Tale of Cha-Lee and Sat-yah" by Demian
- "As the World Grinds to a Halt" by Cheela Smith
- "Another Coming Out Story" by Roberta Gregory
- "Dirty Old Lovers" by Howard Cruse
- "Watch Out" by Vaughn Frick

Some of the themes addressed in this issue were activism, in 'Weekend Revolutionaries' and the pickup or cruising scene in 'Castroids.' This issue included a very positive comic about a gay trans man and his journey through transition. It shows a trans man in a committed, happy relationship living a normal, well-adjusted life.

Gay Comix #4

Gay Comix #4 was published by Kitchen Sink Press in November 1983. It was 44 pages long and sold for $2. Howard Cruse was the editor and Vaughn Frick did the cover illustration. It included the following comics and artists:

- "Poppers" by Jerry Mills
- "Scrapbook: Andy and I" by Jim Yost
- "Networking" by Lee Mars
- "Ode to Phyllis Anne" by Joe Sinardi
- "Walls" by Rick Campbell
- "A Word from our Sponsor" by Jackie Urbanovic and "Bird"
- "Murphey's Manor" by Kurt Erichsen
- "Ready or Not, Here It Comes" by Howard Cruse
- "Etiquette" by Jennifer Camper
- "Stan Stone" by Vaughn Frick
- "The Unicorn Tapestry" by Roberta Gregory
- "Billie" by Jim Yost

Some notable themes in this issue were struggling with being in the closet, in Ode to Phyllis Anne and Walls. 'A Word From Our Sponsor' was a parody commercial for a product a lesbian could use to "de-dyke" her home in a hurry. The issue also touched on the topic of AIDS and safe sex in 'Ready or Not.'

Gay Comix #5

Gay Comix #5 was published by Kitchen Sink Press in 1984. The editor was Robert Triptow, and the cover art was by T. O. Sylvester. It included the following stories and artists:

- "It's Attitude" by Michael J. Goldberg
- "Leonard and Larry in Revenge of the Yenta" by Tim Barela
- "Just Because" by Roberta Gregory
- "Binnie Blinkers" by Richard Valley
- "Zen and the Art of Bush Sex" by Demain
- "Mesozoic Rescue" by Michele Lloyd
- "Simply Beastly" by T.O. Sylvester
- "Poppers" by Jerry Mills
- "Cabbage Patch Clone" by Howard Cruse
- "Better Times" by R. Campbell
- "When Worlds Collide" by Robert Triptow
- "Hot Summer Night" by Camper

Additionally, Milo Poulsen worked on this issue, as well as the issue number 25.

Some of the themes in this issue were relations between gay men and lesbians, and gay men and their mothers, in 'Revenge of the Yenta' and 'When Worlds Collide.' This issue also discusses homophobia in 'Just Because' and 'Binnie Blinkers.'

Gay Comix #6

Gay Comix #6 was published in November 1985 by Bob Ross. It was edited by Robert Triptow. This issue had a cover price of $2. The cover was illustrated by J Mills. Comics included in this issue were:

- "Tommy Teene" by Trina Robbins
- "Gideon and Friends" by Joe Sinardi
- "Terminal Lesbian Couple-itus" by Leslie Ewing
- "Leonard and Larry" by Tom Barela
- "The Sparkle Sisters: Stain on the Sofa" by Kurt Erichsen
- "The Elves and the Leathermaker" by Michael J. Goldberg and Richard Cornwell
- "Wendel in Shopping for Cornflakes" by Howard Cruse

Some of the topics and themes in this issue were anti-gay buzzwords used in marketing to show covert homophobia in "Shopping for Cornflakes", and the joys and pitfalls that come along with being in a lesbian couple in "Terminal Couple-Itus".

Gay Comix #7

Gay Comix #7 was published in spring 1986 by Bob Ross. It was edited by Robert Triptow. Donelan did the cover illustration. This issue had a cover price of $2. This issue included the following comics:

- "Leonard and Larry" by Tim Barela
- "Jayson Gets a Visitor" by J.A. Krell
- "Night Moves" by Donelan
- "Bi Bi Baby" by Robert Triptow
- "Late One Nite" by Roberta Gregory
- "Love Bait" by Michael Goldberg
- "The Sparkle Spinsters: Home Movies" by Kurt Erichsen
- "The Discussion Group" by Donelan
- "Swishy Fishy in Love Bait" by Michael J. Goldberg

Gay Comix #7 touched on AIDS in "Late One Night", bisexuality in "Bi Bi Baby", and coming out in "The Discussion Group".

Gay Comix #8

Gay Comix #8 was published in summer 1986 by Bob Ross and was edited by Robert Triptow. The cover illustration was done by Kalynn. This issue was titled Super Gay Comix and all of the comics featured a superhero of some kind. Comics in this issue included:

- "The Sparkle Spinsters: A Midsummer Night's Super Stud" by Kurt Erichsen
- "Fa-a-abuous Four" by Robert Triptow
- "+Persons" by Robert Triptow
- "Swishy Meets the Caped Cod" by Michael J. Goldberg
- "JaysonMan and ArenaWoman ... An Epicene Epic" by J.A. Krell

Comics in this issue included topics like gay bashing, in "JaysonMan and ArenaWoman", and AIDS in "+Persons", where a group of superhero-esque figures go to "cheer up terminal patients" at the hospital, but are forbidden by their leader to think about the grim realities of AIDS. Super Gay Comix was later referenced in a prank call by the Jerky Boys.

Gay Comix #9

Gay Comix #9 was a special issue of the collected cartoons of Jerry Mills, titled Poppers. It was published in winter 1986 by Bob Ross and edited by Robert Triptow. It had a cover price of $2.

Gay Comix #10

Gay Comix #10 was published in spring 1987 by Bob Ross and edited by Robert Triptow. The cover illustration was done by Peter Keane. Issue #10 had a cover price of $2. Comics in this issue included:

- "A Donelan Look at Women" by Donelan
- "Satyr" by Burton Clarke
- "I Know You Are But What am I?" by Robert Triptow
- "Castro" by Bruce Billings
- "Jayson Dykes It Out" by J.A. Krell
- "The Gay In the Street" by Howard Cruse
- "The Crush" by Alison Bechdel
- "Leonard and Larry" by Tim Barela
- "Mindy and Millie" by Roberta Gregory
- "A Donelan Look at Men"
- "Swishy Fishy Fashion Cutout" by Michael J. Goldberg

Comics in this issue covered topics like the agony of a crush in "The Crush", and monogamy in Leonard and Larry.

Gay Comix #11

Gay Comix #11 was published in winter 1987 by Bob Ross and edited by Robert Triptow. It had a cover price of $2. Comics included in this issue were:

- "Second Chance?" by Howard Stangroom and Stephen Lowther
- "Mid Dyke Crisis" by Leslie Ewing
- "Wee Wee's Gayhouse" by Robert Triptow and Michael J. Goldberg
- "Let's Get Visible" by Roberta Gregory
- "Jayson's New Neighbor" by J.A. Krell
- "Fruitboy" by Robert Triptow
- "Lavendar Booties" by Angela Bocage

This issue discussed topics like homophobia and coming out of the closet, in 'Let's Get Visible.'

Gay Comix #12

Gay Comix #12 was published in spring/summer 1988 by Bob Ross and edited by Robert Triptow. It had a cover price of $2.50. The cover illustration was by Brad Parker. Comics included in this issue were:

- "Jayson Gets Engaged" by J.A. Krell
- "Future Shock Part 1" by Roberta Gregory
- "Romance in the Age of AIDS" by Leslie Ewing
- "Castroids" by Robert Triptow
- "The Sparkle Spinsters: In the Ghetto" by Kurt Erichsen
- "The All Unkind" by Michael J. Goldberg
- "Harry and Ken" by Howard Stangroom and Stephen Lowther

This issue covered topics such as illegal love under oppressive governments in "Future Shock", and lesbian safe sex in the face of AIDS in "Romance in the Age of AIDS".

Gay Comix #13

Gay Comix #13 was published in summer 1988 by Bob Ross and edited by Robert Triptow. It had a cover price of $2.50. The cover illustration was by Michael Goldberg. It had the tagline "Torrid Tales of Politically Incorrect Love". Comics included in this issue were:

- "Our Love Was Too Cosmic" by Vaughn Frick and Michael J. Goldberg
- "Future Shock Part 2" by Roberta Gregory
- "Birds of a Feather" by Robert Triptow
- "Tea and Sympathy" by Groc
- "Acquired Pronoun Deficiency Syndrome" by Michael J. Goldberg
- "My Boss" by Blue
- "Stonewall Riots" by Andrea Natalie
- "Bocage's Boys of the Bioregions", Conceptual Porn Series, Presents: Mission Accomplished by Angela Bocage

This issue covered topics such as homophobic bosses in "My Boss", and pronouns in "Acquired Pronoun Deficiency Syndrome".

Gay Comix #14

Gay Comix #14 was published in winter 1991 by Bob Ross. It was the first to be edited by Andy Mangels. As of issue 14, Gay Comix was to be moved to a regular quarterly publishing schedule, as opposed to the yearly and sporadic schedule it had kept up until that point. This was also the last issue to be titled Gay Comix; later issues were spelled Gay Comics. Mangels changed the title to Gay Comics in part to divest it of the "underground" implications of "comix". Gay Comix #14 had a cover price of $2.50. The cover was designed by Roberta Gregory.

This issue included the following works:

- "Ride the Wild Surf" by Howard Stangroom and Stephen Lowther
- "The Chosen Family: The Wonder If I Am Years" by Noreen Stevens
- "Peace of Mind" by Andy Mangles and Stan Shaw
- "Dyke Dating Game" by Jacki Randall
- "Angriest Dyke" by Jacki Randall
- "Grizzly & Ted" by Tim Barella
- "Future Shock" by Roberta Gregory
- "The Chosen Family: Tabloids" by Noreen Stevens
- "Camper" by Jennifer Camper
- "I Wonder" by Joan Hilty
- "Castro Street 2000" by Michael J Goldberg and Vaughn Frick
- "Mid Dyke Crisis" by Leslie Ewing
- "Bernie" by Dave Young
- "Stonewall Riots" by Andrea Natalie
- "Mistress Silver" by J.D. March
- "Teats" by J.D. March
- "Two Gay Dorks in Fezzes" by Howard Cruse

This issue explored themes including first young heartbreak and realizing your sexuality in 'Chosen Family: Wonder If I Am Years.' It dealt with AIDS and the horrible anxiety of not knowing your status as positive or negative in 'Peace of Mind.'

=== Special issues ===
In addition to the regular issues, there were special issues, the first devoted to Leonard & Larry, a strip by Tim Barela. In his review of the special for The Comics Journal, Ray Mescallado called Leonard & Larry "consistently the high point of Gay Comix whenever it appeared", and noted that Leonard & Larry "proposes something even more radical than an openly gay superhero: plausible gay characters in ordinary situations." He finished his review writing that, "Gay Comix Special 1 could well be the feel good comic of the year."

The second special issue, #19, was devoted to the work of Alison Bechdel.

== Reception ==
In a review of Gay Comix #1, Bill Sherman called the anthology "a beacon to any artist that needs one", saying that "Gay Comix does for gay cartoonists of both sexes what Wimmen's Comix did for femme comix artists: opens the territory for incoming artists."

Gay Comix #3 contained letters from readers. Not all letters were positive. One reader, Jim Clair, commented about issues one and two: "I am gay and proud, and really found the first two issues a 'downer' to gay life. I found no laughter, and was in fact depressed by a few of the stories. Gay life, even in big cities, is hard enough without having to be reminded of it in a magazine that presents itself as a hopefully lighthearted view of our wonderful life." In his review of the first three issues of Gay Comix, Ted White noted that while not every comic addition to the anthology was stellar, editing an anthology that was to cater to an entire category of people was no easy task, and that Cruse's effort shone through. White also allowed that since those who submitted to Gay Comix would be presumed gay or bisexual, Cruse had a smaller than average pool or comic artists to draw from. White summed up his review by saying that Cruse "must deal with more obstacles than usual, and for that reason his achievements thus far in Gay Comix deserve to be applauded".

=== Historical significance ===
Gay Comix was "one of the first undergrounds to look at life from a gay and lesbian perspective". It aimed to and succeeded in showing gay and lesbian people in as normal a light as anyone else. According to Cruse, "we wanted to reflect the feelings real people have. Gay people have been presented stereotypically so much you'd never know that we're perfectly normal people."

Also historically significant is that Alison Bechdel, one of the most well-known lesbian comic artists alive, saw Gay Comix as an inspiration for her own work. In a 2007 Comics Journal article, Bechdel is quoted as saying:

I got out of college in 1981 and went into a gay and lesbian bookstore one day and found an issue of Gay Comix — I think it was the first one, that Howard Cruse had edited — and that was pretty mindblowing. It hadn't occurred to me at that point to put together my penchant for silly drawings with my personal life and my political interest in gay and lesbian issues, but there were these people who were doing it: Howard Cruse and Roberta Gregory and all those early Gay Comix artists. ... I'm very grateful to them for all that groundbreaking work.

== See also ==
- Wimmen's Comix
- Meatmen
