= Chelsea Boys =

American comic strip

- Author(s): Glen Hanson; Allan Neuwirth
- Current status/schedule: ended
- Launch date: 1998
- End date: 2007

Chelsea Boys is an American comic strip created by Glen Hanson and Allan Charles Neuwirth, about the lives of three gay male roommates living in New York City's Chelsea district. The strip first began publication in 1998 in New York's Next magazine.

Stylistically, the strip is very much "of its time", reflecting the prevailing fashion for heaviness of line and a tendency to angularity. In terms of content and characterization, the strip bears some similarities to a 1970s and 1980s comic strip called Poppers, which was drawn by Jerry Mills, though both strips differ artistically.

== Characters ==
- Nathan: a 42-year-old widowed Jewish man. Nathan is portrayed as the "everyman" of the strip, is fairly short, and has a goatee. Though not made explicit, it appears from context that his late partner died of complications from AIDS. He also subsequently dated Steve, who worked in the World Trade Center and was killed in the September 11 attacks.
- Soirée: a flamboyant African-American man around 30 years old. Performs as a drag queen. Soirée was thrown out of his parents' house for being gay when he was a teenager, although he later reconciled with some family members at his father's funeral. Soirée's real name is Delroy Monroe, though his real name is never used by himself or most of the other characters.
- Sky: a 22-year-old Canadian art student. Sky, the son of hippie parents, grew up on a commune. He tends toward being extremely optimistic (if slightly naive), and is cartoonishly well-built, resulting in his attracting a lot of attention from others, although he is often unaware of how attractive he is to both men and women; the gang also once walked in on Sky having sex with his lesbian friend and classmate Annie after returning from the pride parade.
- Miss Marmelstein: Nathan's pet dog, named after Barbra Streisand's character in the Broadway play I Can Get It for You Wholesale.
- Richard: Nathan's best friend.
- Ruben: Richard's boyfriend.
- Annie: Sky's friend and classmate.
- Kelvin Cohen: a vain clothing designer; parody of Calvin Klein. He was also a former classmate of Nathan's at Hebrew school.
- Chris: Sky's boyfriend.
- Curtis: Soirée's boyfriend, a successful lawyer.
- Ricki and Lucie: a lesbian couple who live in Nathan, Soirée and Sky's apartment building. Nathan served as a sperm donor in one storyline so that the couple could have a child (named Lindsay).
- Risa: or Reese for short, Nathan's sister who divorces her husband near the end of the comic strip's run. She has two sons, Jason and Justin.

== Distribution ==
New York's Next magazine is the lead carrier for the strip, which is also syndicated throughout the United States, Canada, the United Kingdom, Spain and South Africa. Hanson and Neuwirth signed a deal in 2005 with Logo to develop a television animated series based on the strip, but after several months of development the network declined to move forward, citing budget concerns.

== Reception ==
While cautioning that it was easy to forget that some of the content might be "too strong" for younger readers, Publishers Weekly said about the Chelsea Boys book in 2003 that "The lessons of shared humanity are appropriate for all ages, though, and they're served up in such a frothy plot and masterful depiction that the medicine is almost entirely disguised by the massive spoonful of sugar."

A review of the Chelsea Boys book in Entertainment Weekly stated, "The Boys may be vividly drawn and their stories memorable, but the creators want it both ways, reveling in LGBT stereotypes while sermonizing against them."

== Strip compilations ==
- Chelsea Boys. published 2003 by Alyson Books.
- Chelsea Boys Steppin' Out!, published 2006 by Bruno Gmünder Books.
