= Bob Ross (publisher) =

American publisher and activist (1934–2003)

- Born: April 2, 1934; New York City, United States
- Died: December 10, 2003 (aged 69); San Francisco, United States
- Occupations: Publisher, activist

Bob Ross (April 2, 1934 – December 10, 2003) was the co-founder and former publisher of the Bay Area Reporter and a key gay rights and AIDS activist in San Francisco. For his lifetime work, he was inducted into the National Lesbian and Gay Journalists Association Hall of Fame for creating two of the "most well-respected and enduring LGBT publications in the country".

== Biography ==
Ross was born in New York City, United States, and moved to San Francisco in 1956. He was working as a chef at the time he started Bay Area Reporter in 1971 with friend Paul Bentley.

In addition to the weekly Bay Area Reporter, Ross published the long-running Gay Comix, beginning in 1985 and continuing until 1998.

Ross died on December 10, 2003, due to complications from diabetes.

== Bob Ross Foundation ==
In 1996, he established the Bob Ross Foundation, which donated to a "broad portfolio of nonprofits". In 2016, the foundation donated $50,000 to purchase equipment for the GLBT Historical Society to digitize and publish a complete searchable archive of the Bay Area Reporter from the first issue in 1971 until 2005, when the newspaper began online operations.

== Awards and honors ==
The annual scholarship awarded by the National Lesbian and Gay Journalists Association of Northern California is named for Bob Ross. It was established in 2006.

In 2013, the National Lesbian and Gay Journalists Association inducted Bob Ross into the HLGJA Hall of Fame.

In 2017, The Bob Ross LGBT Senior Center was opened. It is the first in San Francisco dedicated to the needs of the LGBTQ senior community.
