= Jeff Krell =

American cartoonist

- Born: Jeffrey A. Krell Lehighton, Pennsylvania
- Area: Cartoonist
- Notable works: Jayson

Jeffrey A. Krell is an openly gay American cartoonist, known for his long-running syndicated comic strip Jayson. The strip is about Jayson Callowhill, a skinny farm boy who moves to Philadelphia searching for a job and a man, and has been described as "the gay Archie".

== Career ==
Krell created the comics strip Jayson in 1982, and it began appearing in Philadelphia Gay News the following year. New strips were created for Gay Comix starting with issue #6, and reprints appeared in most volumes of Meatmen, two of the most-read anthologies of LGBT-themed comics. The strip was syndicated nationally beginning in 1989. In 1996, Krell founded his own publishing company, Ignite! Entertainment. Collected editions of selected stories from the strip began in 1997, including Jayson: A New Collection, Jayson: Best of the 80s, and Jayson: Best of the 90s. Original graphic novels published since 2008 include Jayson Goes to Hollywood and Jayson Gets a Job.

In 1998, Krell collaborated with singer/songwriters Romanovsky and Phillips on an off-Broadway Jayson musical comedy, which ran for 10 weeks at The 45th Street Theatre in New York City.

Krell translated a few works by German gay cartoonist Ralf König into english.(Maybe...Maybe Not, Maybe...Maybe Not Again!, and Down to the Bone).

== Works ==
=== Contributions ===
==== Gay Comix ====
- no. 7 (1986) "Jayson Gets a Visitor"
- no. 8 (1986) "JaysonMan and ArenaWoman ...An Epicene Epic"
- no. 10 (1987) "Jayson Dykes It Out"
- no. 11 (1987) "Jayson’s New Neighbor"
- no. 12 (1988) "Jayson Gets Engaged"

==== No Straight Lines: Four Decades of Queer Comics ====
- "Jayson Gets A Visitor"

==== Strip AIDS USA ====
- (1980) "Jayson"

=== Graphic novels ===
==== Jayson: New Collection ====
In 1997, Krell published his first graphic novel with his publishing company Ignite! Entertainment. He started this collection after he realized that he wanted to prove to investors who were interested in Jayson: A New Musical that Jayson had a track record. In other words, Jayson: New Collection contains every comicstrip that inspired the off-broadway musical.

==== Jayson: Best of the 80s and Jayson: Best of the 90s ====
After Krell had taken time off to work on Jayson the Musical, he decided to continue the Jayson series but first wanted to see if there was a market for the series. After putting together some of Jayson's popular stories from the 80s and 90s, the two collections were released in 2005.

==== Jayson Goes to Hollywood ====
In 2008, a day before Jayson comic's 25th anniversary, Krell published “Jayson Goes to Hollywood,” and it was the first series of new Jayson stories. This milestone gave Krell the opportunity to be a featured guest at San Diego Comic-Con’s “Gays In Comics” panel. The series also earned Krell two nominations (Favorite Writer and Favorite Graphic Novel) in the 2009 Comic Buyer's Guide Fan Awards.

In the graphic novel, Jayson goes on an adventure with Arena Stage to find their mutual ex-boyfriend Ed before Arena's sister Meryl, who was first introduced in this series, attempts to take Ed's sperm. It also features panels of Bertha, Jayson's mother, in Philadelphia working as Robyn's assistant for his latest film.

==== Jayson Comics #1 ====
Desperate for a job, Jayson begs his ex-boyfriend Walter to him find a source of income in this debut issue of Jayson comics, which was published in 2011.

==== Jayson Gets a Job! ====
Published in 2012, Jayson is desperate for work and applies at his ex-boyfriend Walter's company, and ultimately gets hired. Unfortunately Arena Stage has a hard time in this issue after her parents cut her off and force her to find a “real job.”

This graphic novel was inspired by the 1977 Archie comic issue “Archie Gets a Job,” which is one of the many Archie comics Krell purchased as a child.

==== Jayson Comics #2 ====
In the second issue of the Jayson comics, which was published in 2012, Jayson finds himself working at his ex-boyfriend Walter's firm, and is forced to work under his husband Steven's authority.

==== Jayson Does Christmas ====
Published in 2014, issue three of the Jayson comic series include a 16 Christmas strips from 1983 to 2014, including an infamous strip for Catholic Christians, “Jayson’s Christmas Carol.”

==== Arena Stage ====
The fourth issue of Jayson comics features Jayson's go to gal pal Arena Stage, and it was published in 2015.

==== Jayson's Joke Book ====
As the fifth issue of Jayson comics, Jayson’s Joke Book was published in 2016 and it contains a variety of pages from the syndicated Jayson comic strip. This graphic novel features comic strips going back to 1984 to 2016, and it also has a game board called, "Help Jayson out of the closet!"

=== Other works ===
==== Jayson: A New Musical ====
In 1998 Krell produced an off-broadway musical Jayson: A new Musical. It was based on Jayson's comic series, specifically the strips featured in Jayson: New Collection, and the songs were by Ron Romanovsky and Paul Phillips.

The production began previews on June 26, 1998, and opened on July 10, 1998. It was directed by Jay Michaels, with musical direction by Simon Deacon and choreography by Kyle Craig. The sets were designed by Jim McNicholas and the costumes Julia VanVliet. Unfortunately the musical's final performance was Aug. 16, 1998, two weeks before its anticipated run. Its cast featured Craig Dawson, Brian Cooper and Susan Agin.

===== Plot =====
After Jayson Callowhill graduates from college, he moves to the city with his two friends, Arena Stage and Robyn Ricketts. While living in the city, Jayson and Arena have a hard time finding a job and become desperate for money, and their solution was to get married. Jayson also deals with heart ache when his well-built lover Eduardo decides to leave Jayson and Medical school to hopefully become a star in Hollywood.

==== Jayson's Christmas Party ====
In 2014, Krell directed and produced Jayson's one and only animated short film. Jayson and Arena decide to throw a Christmas party for frenemies and family.

The cast included Matt Crabtree as Jayson, Lisa Joffrey as Arena, Karen McCarth as Bertha and Dino Andrade as Robyn and Murray.

== Personal life ==
Krell grew up in the fringes of Pennsylvania Dutch County in Leighton, Pennsylvania and occasionally ran into Amish people. He moved to Philadelphia to start his college career as a Liberal Arts student, at the University of Pennsylvania where he met Andrea Jartman, a close friend of Krell's which inspired Jayson's best friend Arena Stage. He came out to his friends first on campus and after graduating college he came out to his parents. His parents visited him in Philadelphia and felt ready to come out to his parents. Unfortunately they did not handle the news well, but after about 20 years he has grown close to his parents and they continue to love his partner.

Krell's childhood consisted him of reading mostly Archie Comics, but his parents could only afford to buy him one comic a week. So while his mother did her weekly food shopping, Krell would spend his time looking at the rack of comics to decide which Archie comic he would pick that day and would read and reread the issue over and over until the next week. To this day, Krell's favorite thing to do at comic conventions is to skim through used comic boxes and search for Archie issues from 1968 to 1972, hoping to find an issue he has yet to own. Krell's love for Archie inspired some of his Jayson works like "Jayson Gets A Job!"
