= Jennifer Camper =

Cartoonist and graphic artist

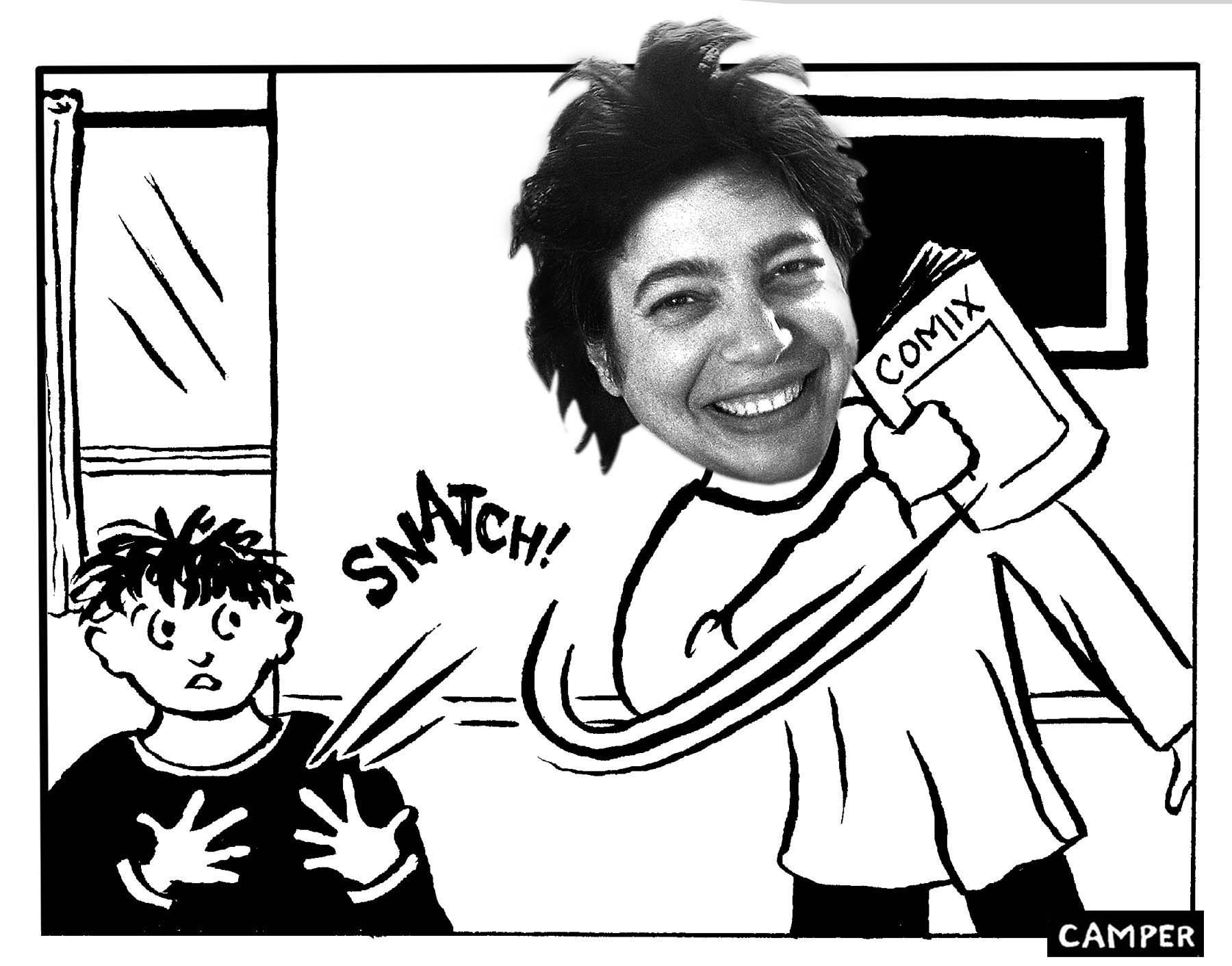
- Area: LGBT comics
- Notable works: Rude Girls and Dangerous Women; Juicy Mother Anthologies; Qu33r

Jennifer Camper is a cartoonist and graphic artist whose work is inspired by her own experiences as a Lebanese-American lesbian. Her work has been published in newspapers, magazines, online, and in anthologies since the 1980s, and has been exhibited in Europe and the United States. Camper is also the creator and founding director of the biennial Queers and Comics conference.

== Early life ==
When she was younger, Jennifer Camper did not have the dream of becoming a cartoonist and contributing to the world of queer comics. In an interview with Rob Kirby on The Comics Journal, Camper stated that she "sort of fell into it and just continued. From early childhood I played with all kinds of art forms, including comics and illustrated stories. In school, I made comics and illustrated stories as class assignments, or for the school paper, and sometimes just to entertain my friends and myself. My family encouraged this."

After gaining support and inspiration from the world around her, Camper began creating full-length comics throughout high school and college. The majority of the comics centered around "ridiculing school policies, teachers and other students." At the end of her school career, Camper began publishing her comics in Gay Community News and started her contributions to one of the most well-known queer comic series Gay Comix.

== Career ==
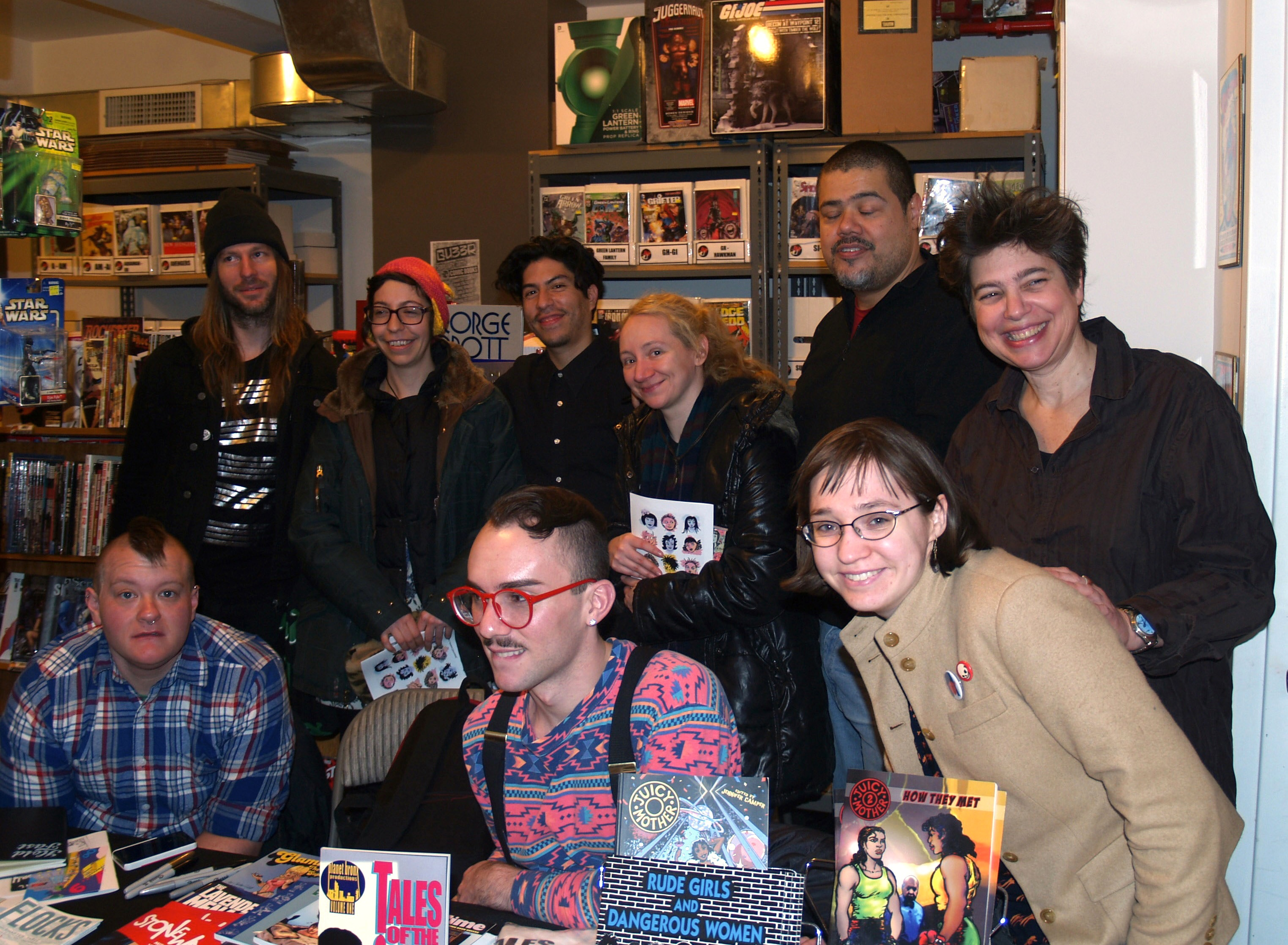
Camper, at right with other LGBT comics creators at a February 28, 2014 signing at Jim Hanley's Universe in Manhattan for the LGBT anthology Qu33r

Camper has been producing comics since the 1980s. Her work has appeared in many publications and is notable for tackling many issues found throughout the LGBTQA+ community. Jennifer Camper is also the editor of the comic book Juicy Mother. Of the title, Camper stated that it "just floated in on the wind. I like the word 'mother' because it can mean both 'Mother' — creator and nurturer — and 'Mutha.' I like the word 'juicy' because, well, who doesn't?" Her editing of this book is very significant due to it being the first anthology of queer comics to have appeared since the release of Gay Comix. She also has published two comic books of her own. Camper explores issues such as gender, race, class, and politics.

In 2015, Camper launched the biennial Queers & Comics conference, an international and inter-generational gathering of queer cartoonists. The first conference was held under the auspices of the Center for LGBT Studies at the CUNY Graduate Center in New York City, with keynote speakers Howard Cruse and Alison Bechdel. The three conferences were seen as a way for queer artists to "learn from each other and to inspire exciting future work. Queer comics offer readers a unique visual literature that reflects and critiques queer culture. The conferences brings together US and international LGBTQ cartoonists and comics writers and artists, as well as scholars, publishers, editors, journalists, and readers of queer comics."

Camper's work has oft been praised for the way it tackles political and social issues throughout the world, but for also how it personally affects others. MK Czerwiec mentions that Camper's Bearing Angry Witness was an important influence on her work.

== Influences ==
Jennifer Camper explained in an interview with Rob Kirby that she discovered underground comix when she was a teenager and then went on to read comics written about the LGBTQA+ community, such as Wimmen's Comix, Tits & Clits, Pudge, Girl Blimp, and Gay Comix. Once she got into reading these comics she says that "I never doubted that there was room for my own voice in comics." Following her teenage years she began to draw comics for the Gay Community News in Boston. She then submitted her work to Gay Comix, where she developed an audience that lead to further assignments.

Camper also described how Howard Cruse's work and extraordinary talent paved the way and influenced her own path into the world of queer comics in another interview. "After getting out of school, I began publishing cartoons and illustrations in Gay News Community and in Gay Comix, edited by Howard Cruse. Howard is the Godfather of queer comics and has mentored so many of us. He is unfailingly generous in sharing his knowledge and techniques."

Camper's Lebanese-American identity has had its own impact on her life as a queer artist as well. "I've had experiences where people have unknowingly said horrible anti-Arab things in my face. When I bust them on their racism, they fall all over themselves trying to justify what they've said, and that's always pretty amusing. I wasn't really part of an Arab community, except for my family, until the 1990s when I began to meet other queer Arabs and Iranians. I thought their experiences were amazing and I began to do comics about them. For a lot of queer Arab women it's a struggle to be a lesbian in the Arab community, and also difficult to be Arab in the gay community. When I met other Arab dykes, many of them were trying to come to terms with being queer in the context of their Arab culture. I was a half-breed dyke trying to connect with my Arab side in the context of my queer life. We sort of met in the middle. Before 9/11, Arabs and Muslims were pretty much invisible to most Americans. Now it's the flavor of the month. It's nice to have people take an interest, but frustrating that it took an attack on America to have that happen."

== Publications ==
=== Showcased publications ===
- The Village Voice
- San Francisco Bay Times
- Ms.
- Curve
- On Our Backs
- Washington Blade
- The Advocate
- Out
- Girlfriends

=== Anthologies ===
- Boy Trouble, edited by Robert Kirby
- Gay Comix
- The Great Women Cartoonists and A Century of Women Cartoonists, both edited by Trina Robbins.
- Two volumes of Juicy Mother
  - Juicy Mother: Celebration, edited by Jennifer Camper, Soft Skull Press, 2005
  - Juicy Mother: How They Met, edited by Jennifer Camper, Manic D Press, 2007

=== Books ===
- Rude Girls and Dangerous Women, published by Laugh Lines Press in 1994
- SubGURLZ, published by Cleis Press in 1999.

=== Contributions ===
- A Century of Women Cartoonists, edited by Trina Robbins, Kitchen Sink Press, 1993,
- The Great Women Cartoonists, edited by Trina Robbins, Kitchen Sink Press, 1997,
- "A Day In The Life...Reference Librarian", Cathy and Jennifer Camper, Revolting Librarians Redux: Radical Librarians Speak Out, edited by Katia Roberts and Jessamyn West, McFarland and Company, Inc., 2003,
- Boy Trouble, edited by Robert Kirby and David Kelly, Boy Trouble Books, 2004
- Dead High Yearbook, edited by Ivan Velez Jr., Dutton Books, (a division of Penguin Group (USA) 2007
- The Book of Boy Trouble 2: Born to Trouble, edited by Robert Kirby and David Kelly, Green Candy Press, 2008

== Nominations ==
- Lambda Literary Award for Humor
- Lambda Literary Award for LGBT Anthologies
