= The Advocate (magazine) =

American LGBTQ magazine

- Cover of the issue from October 9, 2007, featuring Hillary Clinton
- Editorial director, editor in chief: Neal Broverman, Desiree Guerrero
- Categories: Newsmagazine
- Frequency: Bi-monthly
- Circulation: 175,000
- Founded: 1967; 59 years ago
- Company: Pride Media
- Country: United States
- Based in: Los Angeles, California
- Language: English
- Website: advocate.com
- ISSN: 0001-8996
- OCLC: 60638931

The Advocate is an American LGBTQ magazine, printed bi-monthly and available by subscription. The Advocate brand also includes a website. Both magazine and website have an editorial focus on news, politics, opinion, and arts and entertainment of interest to lesbians, gay men, bisexuals, transgender, and queer (LGBTQ) people. The magazine, established in 1967, is the oldest and largest LGBTQ publication in the United States and the only surviving one of its kind that was founded before the 1969 Stonewall riots in Manhattan, an uprising that was a major milestone in the LGBTQ rights movement. On June 9, 2022, Pride Media (The Advocate's previous publisher) was acquired by Equal Entertainment LLC, taking on the name Equal Pride.

== History ==
Masthead from The Advocate, volume 1, issue 1

The Advocate was first published as a local newsletter by the activist group Personal Rights in Defense and Education (PRIDE) in Los Angeles. The newsletter was inspired by a police raid on a Los Angeles gay bar, the Black Cat Tavern, on January 1, 1967, and the demonstrations against police brutality in the months following that raid. Richard Mitch (using the pseudonym "Dick Michaels") and Bill Rau (under the name "Bill Rand") joined PRIDE and, along with Aristide Laurent and artist Sam Winston, transformed the newsletter into a newspaper titled The Los Angeles Advocate. The first issue bore a cover date of September 1967, and was sold for 25 cents in gay bars in Los Angeles. By early 1968, PRIDE was struggling to stay viable and Mitch and Rau paid the group one dollar for ownership of the paper in February of that year. In 1969 the newspaper was renamed The Advocate and distributed nationally. By 1974, Mitch and Rau were printing 40,000 copies for each issue.

The newspaper attracted the attention of David B. Goodstein, an investment banker from San Francisco who bought the publication in 1974. Under Goodstein's direction, The Advocate transformed into a bi-weekly national news magazine covering events important to the LGBT community, including the gay rights movement, with arts and culture. Goodstein also worked toward reducing sex-oriented advertisements in favor of more mainstream sponsors.

Goodstein and Rob Eichberg created The Advocate Experience. Loosely based on the then-popular EST (Erhardt Seminars Training), it was a two-weekend, all-day series of extensive self-realization workshops to bring self-acceptance, awareness and tolerance within the LGBT community. Goodstein and Eichberg facilitated the workshops for much of their duration. Goodstein's later editorials strongly opposed state intervention during the early years of the AIDS epidemic. He argued even though "our lifestyle can become an elaborate suicidal ritual... our safety and survival depends on each of us and our individual behaviour", as opposed to government public health regulations.

Soon after Goodstein's death in 1985, the magazine was transformed from a tabloid-sized newspaper format in two sections (with the second section carrying sexually explicit advertisements) to a standard magazine format, beginning with the October 1, 1985 issue. The sexually explicit material was moved into a separate publication. Breakthroughs in straight celebrity covers came under the flamboyant command of editor in chief, Richard Rouilard in the 1980s and early 1990s. After his death from AIDS, this editorial trend continued successfully with editor in chief Jeff Yarbrough. It was during this time that the magazine stopped carrying sexually explicit advertisements, and in 1992 it launched a sister publication, Advocate Classifieds for its sexually explicit materials. The publisher stated, "We wanted the magazine to be something gay men could leave on the coffee table when their mothers came over," changing the editorial focus to be a news magazine for the gay community with cultural and feature stories about art and entertainment. Between 1990 1992, its ad revenue doubled from USD 1.9 million to USD 3.8 million. In 1996, the magazine had a circulation of 74,000. Under the leadership of its first female editor in chief, Judy Wieder, (1996–2002; editorial director, 2002–2006), The Advocate brought in a variety of voices, won numerous mainstream publishing awards, and set records for newsstand sales, circulation, and advertising. Wieder and her staff's coming-out interviews with such diverse gay luminaries as Ellen DeGeneres, George Michael, Liz Smith, Gore Vidal, Chaz Bono, Jim McGreevey, Melissa Etheridge and Rob Halford garnered the magazine much television exposure and helped to lift the status of The Advocate interviews as well as the visibility of the publication.

The Advocate changed hands through a series of mergers and acquisitions, first unsuccessfully with PlanetOut in 2006, and later with Here Media. In a cost-cutting move in 2008, Here Media, conceding that The Advocate print edition could no longer compete with local weekly LGBT newspapers and the Internet for hard news, switched the magazine from a bi-weekly to a monthly publication cycle. Starting in 2010, Here Media consolidated the distribution for The Advocate and Out magazines. The Advocate print version continues to be published and is available enclosed with Out as a combination package via subscription. In 2010 there were press reports of freelance writers not being paid for their work. As of May 2013, The Advocate is no longer produced in-house at Here Media but by Grand Editorial for Here Media. Grand Editorial is a contractor based in Brooklyn, New York City that also produces Out. Publication frequency has been reduced to bi-monthly with six issues per year.

In 2017, Here Media sold its magazine operations to a group led by Oreva Capital, who renamed the parent company Pride Media.

Zach Stafford served as the editor in chief in 2019, the first Black person to hold that role in the magazine's 50+ year history. In February 2020, Tracy E. Gilchrist was named editor in chief of The Advocate brand. Neal Broverman was named editor in chief of Advocate.com. Diane Anderson-Minshall will continue in the role of Global Chief Content Creator and President.

On June 9, 2022, after OUT acquisition, Mark Berryhill was named CEO of equalpride. Joe Lovejoy is CFO and Mike Kelley is President of Global Growth and Development. Neal Broverman was named editorial director of equalpride and Desiree Guerrero serves as editor in chief of The Advocate, while Alex Cooper serves as editor in chief of advocate.com.

== Comics ==
The Advocate provided a venue for several noteworthy LGBT cartoonists in the 1970s and 1980s. Early in its history, the publication ran single-panel gag cartoons by Joe Johnson featuring effeminate Miss Thing and beefy Big Dick, and "Gayer Than Strange" by Sean. After these were discontinued, It's a Gay Life by Donelan debuted in 1977 and ran for 15 years. Howard Cruse's strip Wendel appeared from 1983 to 1989, transitioning from a single tabloid-size page to two magazine-size pages when the publication changed format. Leonard and Larry by Tim Barela and Servants to the Cause by Alison Bechdel also appeared briefly during the late 1980s.

== Podcast ==
The Advocate produces a podcast called LGBTQ&A, created and hosted by Jeffrey Masters. The LGBTQ&A podcast features interviews with notable LGBTQ figures such as Pete Buttigieg, Laverne Cox, Lili Reinhart, Roxane Gay and Trixie Mattel. The series features a range of LGBTQ guests including activists, politicians, and members of the entertainment industry.

== Awards and accolades ==
In January 2014 The Huffington Post cited three Advocate covers in its feature, "23 Magazine Covers That Got It Right When Depicting Powerful Women": February 2011 (featuring Hillary Clinton), February 2012 (Nancy Pelosi) and January 2013 (Tammy Baldwin, .com edition). The Advocate won the GLAAD Media Award for Outstanding Magazine Overall Coverage in 2020. In 2021, it won the GLAAD Media Award in the Outstanding Online Journalism Article category for the article "Gay Men Speak Out After Being Turned Away from Donating Blood During Coronavirus Pandemic: 'We are Turning Away Perfectly Healthy Donors'".

GLAAD Award nominations (2014)

- Outstanding Magazine Article: "What's Wrong With Exxon?" by Antonia Juhasz (The Advocate)
- Outstanding Magazine Overall Coverage (The Advocate)
- Outstanding Digital Journalism Article: "Prime Timers: Spotlight on LGBT Seniors" (series) (Advocate.com)
- Outstanding Digital Journalism – Multimedia: "We Are Here: LGBTI in Uganda" by Sunnivie Brydum, D. David Robinson (Advocate.com)

== Notable past and present contributors ==
- Calpernia Addams
- Alison Bechdel
- Adam Block
- Chaz Bono (pre-transition)
- Kate Clinton
- Howard Cruse
- Benoit Denizet-Lewis
- Gerard Donelan
- Roger Erickson
- David Francis
- Michael Joseph Gross
- Allan Gurganus
- Matthew Hays
- Janis Ian
- Josh Kilmer-Purcell
- James Kirchick
- Tony Kushner
- Lance Loud
- Lee Lynch (author)
- Parker Marie Molloy
- Ryan Murphy
- Jasika Nicole
- Jack Nichols
- Robert Opel
- Christopher Rice
- B. Ruby Rich
- Gabriel Rotello
- Michael Rowe
- Vito Russo
- Randy Shilts
- Michelangelo Signorile
- Donald Spoto
- Andrew Sullivan
- Urvashi Vaid
- Bruce Vilanch
- Kenji Yoshino
