= Frontiers (magazine) =

American magazine

- Jeffree Star on the cover in April 2006.
- Categories: American LGBT news and lifestyle magazine
- Frequency: Weekly
- Circulation: 270,000 monthly readers, mainly Southern California
- Publisher: Michael Turner
- Founded: 1981
- Final issue: September 2016
- Company: Frontiers Media
- Country: United States
- Language: English
- Website: www.frontiersweb.com
- ISSN: 1526-1972

Frontiers was Southern California's oldest and largest lesbian, gay, bisexual, transgender (LGBT) magazine. Founded in 1981 and published by Robert (Bob) Craig, the magazine was distributed freely at gay bars, clubs and businesses throughout Southern California. The biweekly publication focused on local, national and international news related to the LGBT community, entertainment, as well as coverage of HIV/AIDS-related topics and other important issues, in addition to its popular escort listings section, Frontiers4Men. As of February 2014, it had a staff of 19 and claimed a readership of 270,000.

The publication documented and reported on news events including coming out stories of proximally close celebrities and is archived in many LGBT collections including National Transgender Library collection.

The paper was purchased in 2007 by Mark Hundahl and David Stern. Hundahl died in December 2012. The publication filed for Chapter 11 bankruptcy protection in March 2013. At the time it reported circulation of 30,000 copies on a semi-monthly basis. In February 2014, businessman Michael Turner bought the paper and announced plans to expand its readership base, and to make efforts to attract larger local and national advertisers in lieu of the classified ads and advertising focused on escort services and similar sexual content. The magazine began to be published on a weekly basis.

On September 23, 2016, Frontier's parent, Multimedia Platforms Worldwide, suspended operations due to financial difficulties, effectively shutting Frontiers down.
