= Bay Area Reporter =

Regional newspaper focusing on the LGBT community

- Type: Weekly LGBT newspaper
- Owner(s): BAR Media, Inc.
- Founder: Bob Ross
- Publisher: Michael Yamashita
- News editor: Cynthia Laird
- Founded: 1971; 55 years ago
- Language: English
- Headquarters: 44 Gough Street, Suite 302; San Francisco, California; United States
- Circulation: 29,000
- OCLC number: 26378505
- Website: ebar.com
- Free online archives: cdnc.ucr.edu

The Bay Area Reporter is a free weekly LGBT newspaper serving the LGBT communities in the San Francisco Bay Area. It is one of the largest-circulation LGBT newspapers in the United States, and the country's oldest continuously published newspaper of its kind.

The Reporter is a founding member of the National Gay Newspaper Guild. In 2009, the Reporter had an audited weekly circulation of 29,000, making it the fourth-largest LGBT newspaper in the United States, after New York's Gay City News, the Philadelphia Gay News, and the Washington Blade.

== History ==
On April 1, 1971, Bob Ross and Paul Bentley published the first edition of the Bay Area Reporter. It was originally distributed to gay bars in the South of Market, Castro District, and Polk Gulch areas of San Francisco, but since expanded distribution to throughout the Bay Area. In 1975, Ross bought co-founder Bentley.

In the 1980s, the Reporter became a leading source of updated developments about the AIDS crisis; in 1983, the paper broke the story that up to 40 percent of people with AIDS in the United States were from racial and ethnic minorities, shattering a widely held stereotype that AIDS was a "white gay man's disease." In 1998, the paper made headlines around the world with its now-famous "No Obits" headline, marking the significance of HIV treatments by noting the first time since the AIDS epidemic began in 1981 that the newspaper received no death notices in a given week.

In 2003, owner Ross died. In April 2013, it was announced that the San Francisco Newspaper Co., which owned the alternative weeklies San Francisco Bay Guardian (now defunct) and SF Weekly and the daily San Francisco Examiner, agreed to purchase a 49 percent minority stake in the Bay Area Reporter. A new company, BAR Media, Inc., was created, with Michael Yamashita, the newspaper's longtime general manager, becoming publisher with a 31 percent ownership. The Bob Ross Foundation, parent of Benro Enterprises Inc., would own 20 percent while Todd Vogt and Patrick Brown, the principal owners of the San Francisco Newspaper Co., would own the remaining 49 percent. Under the new structure, Yamashita became president and CEO of BAR Media Inc., while Thomas E. Horn, the foundation's executive director and the paper's publisher from 2003 to 2013, was named chairman of the board. Brown became the new company's vice president and chief financial officer.

In December 2017, Yamashita purchased the paper after acquiring shares from the two former investors. Yamashita became the first gay Asian-American publisher and owner of an LGBTQ newspaper.

In 2019, John Ferrannini joined the staff as an assistant news editor. In 2020, Jim Provenzano was promoted to Arts & Nightlife Editor.

In April 2026, the B.A.R. celebrated its 55th anniversary, including a proclamation by San Francisco Mayor Daniel Lurie.

== Online Archives ==
The Bay Area Reporter is archived on two different websites. Editorial contents published weekly on the website the newspaper launched in 2005 are retained on that site in a searchable archive. In addition, the complete series of issues from 1971 to 2005 is being digitized and posted online by GLBT Historical Society in San Francisco, which preserves the most complete collection of print issues; the first group covering 2000 to 2005 was released in January 2018, and the society projects publication of the remaining issues from 1971 to 2000 by the end of 2018. Both archives are available to all users free of charge.

In 2009, the GLBT Historical Society in San Francisco launched an online searchable database of the more than 10,000 obituaries and death notices that have appeared in the Bay Area Reporter, starting with the first such article published in the newspaper in 1979; many of the obituaries reflect the catastrophic toll of the AIDS epidemic in San Francisco from the early 1980s through the late 1990s.

== See also ==
- Jim Provenzano
- San Francisco Sentinel
- LGBT culture in San Francisco
