= Nicole Ferentz =

Nicole Ferentz is an American cartoonist, illustrator, graphic designer, and teacher. Her works cover feminist themes, lesbian themes, and themes of illness. Her comics have been featured in prominent queer comics like Gay Comics.

== Education ==
Nicole Ferentz earned her BFA and MFA from the School of the Art Institute of Chicago.

== Career ==
=== Comics ===
Ferentz's cartoons are often biographical reflections of her own life that feature elements of humor within them.

==== Roz Warren's cartoon collections ====
Nicole Ferentz's work as a female comic creator is showcased in some of Roz Warren's comic collections.

A biography on Ferentz is included alongside the biographies and works of bisexual and lesbian cartoonists like Alison Bechdel, Angela Bocage, and Karen Favreau within Roz Warren's Dyke Strippers: Lesbian Cartoonists A to Z.

Roz Warren's curated collection of comics Mothers!: Cartoons by Women features contributions from cartoonists like Ferentz, Claire Bretécher, Barbara Brandon, Roz Chast, and Jennifer Camper.

Ferentz's work on sex and relationships is featured alongside female cartoonists like Alison Bechdel, Claire Bretécher, and Roberta Gregory within Roz Warren's What Is This Thing Called Sex?.

The Best Contemporary Women's Humor is Roz Warren's compilation of comic strips and panels by female cartoonists like Nicole Ferentz, Alison Bechdel, Jennifer Camper, and Diane DiMassa that covers topics like motherhood, relationships, and women in the workforce.

==== Gay Comics ====
The 17th edition of Gay Comics (previously Gay Comix) includes a comic contribution by Nicole Ferentz within a larger section covering the 1993 March on Washington. Ferentz's work is included in this issue of Gay Comics alongside other cartoonists like Robert Kirby, Kris Kovick, Leslie Ewing, and Roberta Gregory.

=== Illustrations ===
Nicole Ferentz's work in collaboration with Celeste West focused on topics like lesbian sex and polyfidelity. Ferentz took on the role of illustrator for Celeste West's novels A Lesbian Love Advisor and Lesbian Polyfidelity. Both of West's novels illustrated by Ferentz were nominated for Lambda Literary Awards; A Lesbian Love Advisor was nominated in the 2nd Lambda Literary Awards under both Lesbian Nonfiction and Humor and Lesbian Polyfidelity was nominated in the 9th Lambda Literary Awards for the Small Press Book Award.

=== Art curation ===
Nicole Ferentz's city-wide project "The Critical Messages Show" was a collection of political audio recordings, videos, and posters by female artists from across the country placed in public trains and buses across Chicago. Nicole Ferentz acted as a co-curator alongside Anita David to create "The Critical Messages Show" under the sponsorship of the Artemisia Gallery. Several works from the show were censored and banned by the Chicago Transportation Authority for their focus on contemporary public issues.

Ferentz is a credited contributor to the 1986 Hallwalls Exhibition "Artists from Artemisia" which featured the works of a number of Chicago-based female artists under the curation of Catherine Howe.

Ferentz designed an event-specific logo t-shirt for the cooperative art exhibit Artemisia Flex at the Artemisia Gallery which looked to portray a feminist, artistic view on women body builders.

=== Other work ===
==== Graphic design ====
- Ferentz worked as a graphic designer and published her own book Time Warp: a History of Graphic Design. She ran her own graphic design firm for over a decade that worked primarily with activist and cultural groups.
- Ferentz worked as a graphic designer, and web development consultant for the Girl's Best Friend Foundation (GBF) in Chicago, Illinois. Her work with the GBF began in 2003 and involved her contributions as a graphic designer of brochures, websites, and postcards for the foundation.

==== Loyola University Chicago ====
In 2007, Nicole Ferentz was named the Director of Fine Arts for the Department of Fine and Performing Arts at Loyola University Chicago.
