= Women comics creators =

Although, traditionally, female comics creators have long been a minority in the industry, they have made a notable impact since the very beginning, and more and more female artists are getting recognition along with the maturing of the medium. Women creators have worked in every genre, from superheroes to romance, westerns to war, crime to horror.

In certain countries, like Japan and South Korea, women creators have shaken up the traditional market and attained widespread mainstream success.

== Americas ==
=== United States ===
==== Newspaper comics ====
In the early 20th century, when the U.S. newspaper comics market was in its infancy, William Randolph Hearst brought the artist Nell Brinkley over from the competing Denver Post, and although not doing comics herself, her romantic and glamorous imagery became an inspiration to a generation of female comics artists.

Another style popular around the time was cute comics with doll-like round-cheeked children. In 1909, Rose O'Neill created The Kewpies, a series continuing for decades and widely used in various marketing purposes.

Another cartoonist, Grace Wiederseim (also known as Grace Drayton and Grace Gebbie), worked in a similar vein and, from the 1910s until the 1930s, created a multitude of series with cherubic children bearing names such as Toodles, Dimples, Dolly Dingle, and Dottie Darling. She was also the creator of the "Campbell kids," which Campbell Soup employed for marketing purposes up until the 1930s. Her sister, Margaret G. Hays was also a frequent collaborator with her on several of her works.

In the 1910s, newspaper cartoonist Fay King was drawing early autobiographical comics in The Denver Post and Cartoons Magazine.

Edwina Dumm created a long-lasting series in 1918 about a boy and a dog called Cap Stubbs and Tippie, although the frisky dog Tippie soon took over the strip as its most popular character. The series ran until the 1960s.

In the 1920s, the USA underwent an economic boom and widespread social change, leading to the appearance of the "flapper", a female subculture receiving a lot of media attention at the time. Flappers enjoyed partying, jazz music and free dating, and defied many of the social norms surrounding women at the time. Several female cartoonists picked up on the flapper stereotype, often working in a stylish art deco style, including Ethel Hays (with her comic strip Marianne and her famous cartoon Flapper Fanny), Virginia Huget (Gentlemen Prefer Blondes, Babs in Society), Gladys Parker (Gay and her Gang) and Marjorie Henderson Buell (Dashing Dot).

In the 1930s, the Great Depression had struck the US, and stories about poor but happy families, and their stoic struggles to make a living, became popular reader fare. Martha Orr created one of the most successful series, Apple Mary, about an old lady selling apples around the neighborhood, in 1932.

The accounts on the series' final fate differs. Most sources state that in 1938, she left it to her female assistant Dale Conner, who renamed it Mary Worth, although King Features Syndicate's own account claims that Apple Mary folded and Mary Worth was its replacement. In 1940, a new writer Allen Saunders was brought in, and Conner and Saunders began signing the strip with the joint pseudonym "Dale Allen", which remained after Conner left the series. Mary Worth has proven a successful concept, and is still syndicated around the globe.

In 1935, Marjorie Henderson Buell (signature "Marge") created the comic panel Little Lulu, later spawning a successful comic book series by John Stanley and Irving Tripp. This character inspired the name for the organization Friends of Lulu, an organization promoting reading and authoring of comics to girls and women.

In 1940, veteran artist Dale Messick created the comic strip Brenda Starr, Reporter, about a glamorous reporter with a soap opera-like love life. After Messick left the series, it was continued solely by other female artists.

In 1941, Tarpé Mills created the superheroine strip Miss Fury for the Sunday pages. Striking a chord among the readers, she was drawing the strip until 1951.

Jackie Ormes was the first nationally syndicated female black cartoonist with her series Torchy Brown, created in 1937 as a humoristic adventure strip lasting for three years, and picked up again in 1950 as Torchy Brown's Heartbeats, basically revamped as a black version of Brenda Starr, Reporter, with the young black eponymous character stumbling onto adventure after adventure, and going from one love interest to another, although the series also took up more serious subjects such as racial bigotry and environmental pollution. The series never became a widespread success, since it was only picked up by black-owned newspapers.

In the 1940s, teen comics became a popular genre. This was a rather down-to-earth genre, mostly comedy-inclined and marketed towards young teenage girls, where young, often gangly, teenagers went through different problems with the opposite sex and dating. Notable artists to mention include Hilda Terry (Teena, 1941), Marty Links (Emmy Lou, 1944) and Linda Walter (Susie Q. Smith, together with her husband Jerry Walter on scripts). These three artists all had earlier works in the fashion field. In 1951, after some internal arguments within the organization, Terry became the first female cartoonist to be accepted to the National Cartoonists Society.

Other successful strips include Cathy Guisewite's semi-autobiographical Cathy, about a neurotic city woman and her problems with shopping and romance, and Lynn Johnston's For Better or For Worse, about the Patterson household and their family relationships.

Containing much pointed social commentary in addition to character-based humor, Nicole Hollander's strip Sylvia is distributed nationally by Tribune Media Services, with 19 published books collecting strip selections.

Due to the syndicates' often strict demands on recurring characters and an unwillingness to risk offending readers, some cartoonists have gone into self-syndication to maintain control of their work. Some long-running self-syndicated comics are the feminist Maxine or Laughing Gas by cartoonist and author Marian Henley (not to be confused with John M. Wagner's Hallmark character) and the surrealist Way Lay or Story Minute by underground veteran Carol Lay.

==== Mainstream comic books ====
Comic books, as well, have been produced by a number of female artists.

One publisher in particular, Fiction House, used many female cartoonists, both on staff and through Eisner & Iger, one of the era's comics packagers that would supply comic books on demand to publishers testing the emerging medium. Action and adventure-oriented genres were popular at this time, and Fiction House's forte was capable and beautiful female protagonists, working as pilots, detectives, or jungle adventuresses. Women working for the publisher include Lily Renée, at the Lambiek Comiclopedia Fran Hopper and future romance artists Ruth Atkinson and Ann Brewster. These stories were frequently written by a female writer, as well: Ruth Roche, later an editor. Before finding fame as a crime novelist, Patricia Highsmith wrote for Black Terror and other comic books.

In the 1950s Marie Severin, sister of artist John Severin, was a frequent EC and Atlas/Marvel colorist, later drawing her own stories as well. Her cartoon style made her a frequent contributor to Marvel's Not Brand Echh satirical title of the late 1960s. Another prolific artist was Ramona Fradon, who drew Aquaman and was co-creator of Metamorpho.

Later artists and writers include Ann Nocenti (creator of Typhoid Mary and Longshot), Louise Simonson (Power Pack writer), June Brigman (Power Pack artist), Gail Simone (Welcome to Tranquility), Devin Grayson (Batman writer), Becky Cloonan, the first female Batman artist, Marjorie Liu (The Amazing X-Men writer), Sara Pichelli (Ultimate Spider-Man artist), G. Willow Wilson (Ms. Marvel), Amanda Conner (Power Girl artist), Erin Williams, and Kelly Sue DeConnick (Pretty Deadly, Bitch Planet) at Image Comics.

==== Underground, alternative and independent ====
The underground comix movement attracted women artists, as it allowed more mature themes and personal work than the commercial newspaper and comic book industry of the time. A pioneer in this market was Trina Robbins, a driving force in the creation of the early all-female comix books It Ain't Me, Babe and All Girl Thrills, and later founder of the anthology series Wimmen's Comix. Robbins has written several books about female cartoonists and their comics.

Another all-female comix book series was Tits & Clits Comix, founded by Lyn Chevely and Joyce Farmer, who were inspired by the honesty in the underground comix, but appalled by the frequent male sexist perspective and attitude. With the conviction that sex was political, the series was created with the focus of sex and sexuality from a female perspective.

Artists who grew out of this movement include Lee Marrs (Pudge Girl Blimp about an overweight self-obsessed wannabe hippie girl), Shary Flenniken (Trots and Bonnie about a precocious girl and her dog trying to make sense of their suburban life), Aline Kominsky (The Bunch, autobiographical depiction of her least flattering sides) and Dori Seda (autobiographical stories).

After the underground scene turned into the alternative scene, women artists continued to focus on autobiographical work, such as Debbie Drechsler (Daddy's Girl, 1996, about incest and sexual abuse during childhood) and Phoebe Gloeckner (Diary of a Teenage Girl, 2002).

The scene's unapologetic attitude also inspired artists outside the US, such as Canadian Julie Doucet, whose surrealist semi-autobiographical series Dirty Plotte became a worldwide cult favorite in the 1990s.

The underground/alternative market allowed for a more open depiction of sexuality, and in the 1970s and 1980s openly lesbian and bisexual artists told their stories in comic book form, such as Mary Wings (artist of the first all-lesbian comix book Come Out Comix (1973)), Roberta Gregory (Bitchy Bitch, and frequent contributor to Gay Comix) and Alison Bechdel (Dykes to Watch Out For and graphic novel Fun Home, 2006).

In the independent market, that began to appear from the 1970s, Wendy Pini, together with her husband Richard Pini, started the manga-inspired series Elfquest, which soon became a major sleeper hit.

Colleen Doran created her cult space opera series A Distant Soil which was published in the early-1980s in small press fanzines, then self-published by Doran in the early-1990s, before moving to Image Comics in 1996.

Other popular artists include Donna Barr (Desert Peach, about Erwin Rommel's fictional gay brother), Jill Thompson (Scary Godmother, a friendly witch in a Halloween environment) and Linda Medley (Castle Waiting, daily lives of fairytale characters).

==== Webcomics ====
Many female comic creators have found their fame in webcomics and later published hard copies of their work, such as Kate Beaton for Hark! A Vagrant!, and Allie Brosh's Hyperbole and a Half. Others, like Emily Carroll (known for the webcomic His Face All Red) went on to work on other multimedia projects, such as Carroll's Gone Home.

Female webcomic artists include writers and illustrators such as Kate Leth (Canadian), Mary Cagle, Danielle Corsetto, Ramsey Beyer, Lucy Knisley, Abby Howard, Madeleine Flores (Adventure Time), Dorothy Gambrell, Liz Prince, and Erika Moen, who worked with Grace Ellis and ND Stevenson on the popular alternative print series Lumberjanes.

== Asia ==
Countries with a large percentage of female comics creators include Japan and South Korea.

=== Japan ===
The first significant female manga artist was Machiko Hasegawa, creator of the family-oriented Sazae-san, which launched in 1946 in the newspaper Asahi Shimbun. It ran for several decades.

Comics intended for girls (shoujo manga) have had a long history in Japan. They grew out of lifestyle magazines directed at girls and teenagers in the early 20th century. These magazines featured romantic short stories and fashionable illustrations, supervised by male editorial staff.

In 1953 the "God of Manga" Osamu Tezuka published his classic Princess Knight, with a longer, more complex storyline and a gender ambiguous protagonist. This manga was a great influence on many Japanese women creators.

The long-running monthly magazines Ribon and Nakayoshi appeared in the 1950s, and the weeklies Shojo Friend and Margaret appeared in 1963. Most of these early comics were written by men such as Tetsuya Chiba, Mitsuteru Yokoyama and Fujio Akatsuka. They failed to attract a wide readership.

In the 1960s, Yoshiko Nishitani created works featuring glamorous teen girls in lead roles, with once-taboo romances as a central theme. This helped pave the way for a great wave in the late-1960s to early-1970s when a loose connection of women, later given the name year 24 group, merged Tezuka's "story manga" narratives with the romantic art style from the girls' lifestyle magazines and, in the process, revolutionized the genre, both in visual experimentation (including montage-like page layouts) and story subjects.

Some of these artists such as Keiko Takemiya and Moto Hagio wrote stories featuring young gay male lovers involved in tragic relationships. These stories proved immensely popular and gave birth to the yaoi genre, still very popular. (Keiko Takemiya later made the popular sci-fi Toward the Terra.)

Since then, girl comics have been a flourishing scene, which, in general, has both been created and read by women, has had a notable part of the market, and, as manga is becoming increasingly popular abroad, more and more is making an impact on Western countries.

Later popular artists include Rumiko Takahashi (drawing primarily shonen stories for boys), Hiromu Arakawa (Fullmetal Alchemist), Kazue Kato (Blue Exorcist) as well as the female collective Clamp.

Japan doesn't only produce comics for children and adolescents, but also has a seinen (adult men) and a josei (adult women) scene, allowing more mature themes and storylines.

Many of the artists working for this market have gained wide recognition among the alternative comics scenes in USA and Europe, including artists such as Kiriko Nananan, Moyoco Anno, Junko Mizuno and Kan Takahama.

=== South Korea ===
Korean comics are known as manhwa (similar etymologically to Japanese manga). Comics became popular especially in the 1950s and 1960s. The sunjeong (sunjŏng) genre became especially popular among young girls and women. The Korean Women Cartoonist Association (KWCA) served the women in the field. It was founded on December 2, 1997, and the website was active between 2001 and 2012. In 2019, the site was used for the Wooden Architecture Association.

South Korean-born Keum Suk Gendry-Kim published comic books with a great deal of political content. Her graphic novels include The Song of My Father, Jiseul, Kogaeyi, and award-winning Grass (2019), a story about a Korean girl forced into sexual slavery for the Japanese military during the World War II. In 2020, it won the Harvey Award for Best International Book.

== Europe ==
Although a minority, there have been female artists working in the medium even since its earliest days. One of the earliest female artists was Marie Duval, who, together with her husband Charles Henry Ross. was co-creator and artist of one of the earliest recurring characters in modern cartoons and comics, Ally Sloper.

Tove Jansson is best known as a book writer, but she did also write and draw comics featuring her characters, "The Moomins" in the 1950s, containing the same poetical qualities as her books.

In the UK, Posy Simmonds started her career in 1979 with the weekly comic strip The Silent Three of St. Botolph's for The Guardian about the daily life of three former schoolfriends, which lasted for a decade. She had also written children's books, often in comic form, such as Fred (where later a successful animated special) and Lulu and The Flying Babies. For the 1990s and 2000s, she has done more serious works, inspired by literary classics, such as Gemma Bovery and Tamara Drewe.

=== France/Belgium ===
An early veteran on the Franco-Belgian market was Liliane Funcken (née Schorils), who, after meeting her husband Fred Funcken (himself a comics veteran), teamed up with him to embark on a long-lasting career with Tintin magazine from the 1950s up until the 1980s, where the couple collaborated on comics and illustration. They have adopted a realistic style, and mostly specialise in historic works.

One of the earliest successful female artists was Claire Bretécher, who started her career in the 1960s and is famed for her humor series Les Frustrés and the co-creation of the magazine L'Écho des savanes along with Gotlib and Mandryka.

In 1976, the French magazine Ah ! Nana was launched. It was inspired by the feminist underground comix from the US, published by Humanoïdes Associés and was an attempt to branch out of Metal Hurlant magazine by the same editor with a majority of female artists. It tried to adhere to the rock'n'roll attitude of the former magazine, and sometimes featured male artists from the magazine, such as Jacques Tardi and Moebius. Every issue was built around a theme, such as Nazism or homo- and transsexuality. Issue 7, 1978, about sadomasochism was deemed pornography and was forbidden to sell to minors below 18 years of age, a rule which by extension forbade kiosks to advertise the magazine, thus cutting off many of the magazine's market outlets. In the end, this forced the cancellation of the magazine due to bad sales, through means considered by the authors as censorship of a feminist voice. The last issue was issue 9, themed around incest. No similar comics magazine has since appeared in the Franco-Belgian market, but it helped launch or consolidate the careers of Chantal Montellier (gritty, feminist, political sci-fi), Nicole Claveloux (surreal fantasy) and Florence Cestac (funny cartoons).

Another author that appeared during this time was Annie Goetzinger, who worked in a realistic Art Nouveau style and drew adventures with female protagonists. She frequently collaborated with Pierre Christin, and has won two awards at the Angoulême festival.

In the beginning of the 21st century, Marjane Satrapi released the critically acclaimed Persepolis about her childhood and coming-of-age in a politically turbulent Iran, and in Europe.

== See also ==
- Friends of Lulu
- List of female comics creators
- List of feminist comic books
- Portrayal of women in comics
