= Rick Worley =

American cartoonist and YouTuber (born 1982)

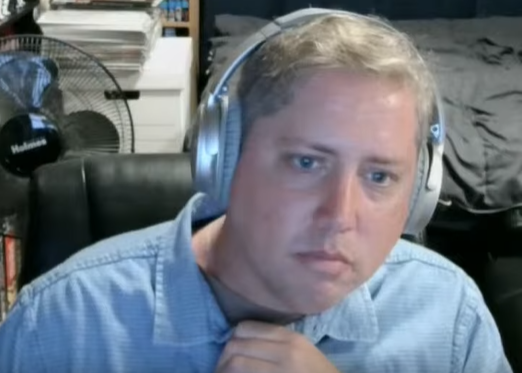
- Born: Rick Worley; October 3, 1982 (age 44)
- Area: Cartoonist
- Notable works: A Waste of Time

Rick Worley (born October 3, 1982) is an American cartoonist and YouTuber, known for his comic strip A Waste of Time and his YouTube videos about Star Wars and Woody Allen.

== Career ==
=== Cartoonist career ===
Worley began the strip A Waste of Time in 2008. A collection of the strips was published by Northwest Press in 2011, followed by a series of new material beginning in 2014. The strip is about an anthropomorphic rabbit named Rick (a stand-in for the creator) and his friends and associates, which include Truckstop (a sexually adventurous fox), Prester (an alcoholic teddy bear), Rickets (an amnesiac robot), and Capitalist Pig (a piggy bank). The series also depicts realistic human characters, including Rick's boyfriends, and fictionalized versions of cartoonists Bill Watterson and Jim Davis.

In February 2013, Worley co-curated with Justin Hall the San Francisco art exhibit "Batman on Robin", featuring works exploring the theme of homoeroticism between Batman and Robin. His work has been featured in No Straight Lines: Four Decades of Queer Comics, published by Fantagraphics in 2012; editor Robert Kirby's hardcover anthology QU33R in 2014; and in What’s Your Sign, Girl? an astrological anthology edited by Kirby 2016.

Worley posted his first comic strip, on his Patreon, on 29 September 2018. Since then, he has used his Patreon for his comics as well as his videos.

=== YouTube ===
Worley posted his first video essay, “How to Watch Star Wars, Part One: The Prequels Are Better Movies Than You Deserve“, on 7 September 2019. Since then, Worley has published a mixture of video essays, reviews of films and film rankings. Worley also conducted interviews with the film historians J. W. Rinzler and Paul Duncan about their behind-the-scenes books of the Star Wars movies.

== Published works ==
Comics

A Waste of Time

- A Waste of Time, Volume 1. Northwest Press. 2011. ISBN 978-0984594030.
- A Waste of Time, Volume 2, #1. Northwest Press. 2014. ISBN 978-1938720567.
- A Waste of Time, Volume 2, #2. Northwest Press. 2014. ISBN 978-1565812314.
- A Waste of Time, Volume 2, #3. Northwest Press. 2015. ISBN 978-1938720604.

Anthology with Rick Worley’s work featured

- The Comic Book Guide to the Mission. Skoda Man Press. 2011. ISBN 978-0983110309.
- No Straight Lines: Four Decades of Queer Comics. Fantagraphics. 2012. ISBN 978-1-60699-718-5.
- QU33R. Northwest Press. 2014. ISBN 978-1938720369.
- What's Your Sign, Girl?. Ninth Art Press. 2015. ISBN 978-0990343332.
