= Michelle Rau =

American cartoonist

Michelle Rau is an American cartoonist, writer, and artist known for publishing her cartoon zine, Lana's World. She was an active contributor in the alternative publishing, queer zine, and comics landscape of the 1980s and 1990s.

== Life ==
Rau received a Bachelor of Arts from the University of Oregon and later completed graduate studies in journalism and communication.

== Career ==
=== Contributions ===
Rau has contributed to a number of publications, collaborating alongside many well-known queer cartoonists, editors, and publishers.

- Strange Looking Exile, issues no. 2, 3, and 5, created and published by Robert Kirby
- Girljock Magazine, issue no. 2, created and edited by Roxxie
- Holy Titclamps, issues no. 4, 10, and 11, created by Larry Bob Roberts
- Lesbian Contradiction, issue no. 30

=== Factsheet Five ===
Rau assisted R. Seth Friedman after he became the publisher and editor of Factsheet Five. Rau worked as a staff reviewer, using the staff reviewer tag MIR. In Issue no. 38, Rau contributed her experience to the "Why Publish?" article.

=== Lana's World ===
In 1989 Rau started creating a comic book, Lucky Rabbit's Reality No.1, which instead became the first issue of Lana's World, her cartoon zine. Lana's World circulated from 1989 to 1992.

Lana's World began as a solo endeavor, but quickly featured editorials, book, comic, and zine reviews, advertisements, and comics by many cartoonists in the total of 11 issues that were published between 1989 and 1991.

Rau collaborated with and received support from many in the field. Lana's World includes contributions from Gail Elber, Trina Robbins, Roxxie, Heather Perkins, Anne Lehmer, Nikki Gosch, Karen Platt, Angela Bocage, Rhonda Dicksion, Roberta Gregory, Dawn Manna, among many others. Rau frequently credits names like Mike Gunderloy and Alison Bechdel in the issues for their support in publishing Lana's World.

=== "From APA to Zines" ===
Rau While attending graduate school, Rau studied fanzines, zines, and alternative media publishing. She continued researching the history of zines, publishing "From APA to Zines: Towards a History of Fanzine Publishing" in the Alternative Press Media in 1994. Rau's work has been referenced a number of times by scholars of zines, alternative media, underground publishing, and self-publishing.

=== Self-publishing ===
Rau was frequently acknowledged for her work in the zine and self-publishing world. Kirby repeatedly acknowledged Rau in the forewords of Strange Looking Exile issues, and later commented crediting Rau as one of his inspirations for self-publishing Strange Looking Exile.

Rau is not a career cartoonist or author, but she has continued to write, publish, and pursue creative projects including works like her 2011 novel Guest Room of the Heart. Rau works as a technical writer and she also started a company, How Do You Spell It Productions. Rau has written and published in recent years sharing work through her website, Medium account, email newsletter, and social media.
