= Jon Macy =

Gay American cartoonist

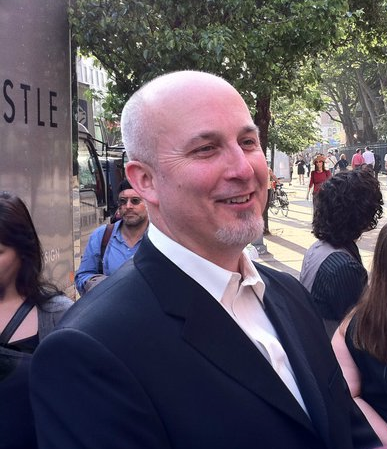
- Jon Macy at the Lambda Literary Awards, New York, 2011.
- Born: 11 September 1964 (age 62)
- Notable works: Djuna: The Extraordinary Life of Djuna Barnes
- Collaborators: Sina Shamsavari and Justin Hall
- Awards: 2010 Lambda Literary Award for Gay Erotica

Jon Macy is a gay American cartoonist. He is best known for his graphic novel DJUNA: The Extraordinary Life of Djuna Barnes, a biography of the beautiful and irascible Modernist author. His graphic novel Teleny and Camille won a 2010 Lambda Literary Award for Gay Erotica. Some of his works have been finalists for other Lambda Literary Awards.

== Early life ==
Jon Macy was born on September 11, 1964, in California.

== Career ==
Macy's first series, Tropo, was part of the early 1990s black and white alternative comics boom. It was followed by the erotic horror series Nefarismo, published October 1994 – October 1995 by Eros Comix. These stories contained dark and surreal motifs, mixing eroticism with hallucination and death/rebirth, a common theme in Macy's personal works.

Throughout the 1990s, Macy contributed to queer comics anthologies Meatmen and Gay Comics, and gay skin magazines such as Steam by Scott O'Hara, Bunkhouse and International Leatherman. His work on Meatmen included a short story entitled "Tail". Gilad Padva argues in his academic paper "Dreamboys, Meatmen and Werewolves: Visualizing Erotic Identities in All-male Comic Strips" (2005) that Macy's "Tail" eroticizes and politicizes Sigmund Freud's homophobic myth of the Wolf Man.

After a hiatus of eight years, during which time he worked on his graphic novel Teleny and Camille, Macy began publishing again with an autobiographical story, "Crazy in Bed", published in Robert Kirby's anthology The Book of Boy Trouble, Vol. 2. He has since collaborated with various established and independent gay cartoonists, including Sina Evil and Justin Hall.

In 2010, Macy's Teleny and Camille was published by Northwest Press, a graphic adaptation of the classic anonymous erotic novel Teleny, attributed to be a collaboration between Oscar Wilde and other writers he knew. Teleny and Camille then was awarded the 2011 Lambda Literary Award for Gay Erotica. An excerpt was featured in Teleny Revisited, a special issue of The Oscholars. Also in 2010, he, Diego Gomez and Fred Noland contributed to Justin Hall's Glamazonia: The Uncanny Super Tranny. It was a finalist for the 2011 Lambda Literary Award for Transgender Fiction.

Macy produced the self-published comic book series Fearful Hunter (2010–2014), started as an act of protest against California's Proposition 8. After the first three issues were published, this title was picked up by Northwest Press, who hosted a Kickstarter fundraiser in April 2014 to publish a compiled anthology including the final previously unpublished fourth issue. Fearful Hunter won the Prism Comics Queer Press Grant in 2010.

He has contributed to many anthologies including Justin Hall's No Straight Lines: Four Decades of Queer Comics and Robert Kirby's Qu33r. He was co-editor, with Tara Madison Avery, of ALPHABET: the LGBTQAIU creators from Prism Comics. ALPHABET was a finalist for the 2017 Lambda Literary Award for Anthology.

In 2024, Macy published Djuna: The Extraordinary Life of Djuna Barnes. It is a graphic biography about Djuna Barnes, a queer writer who befriended many American cultural figures like Peggy Guggenheim and T.S. Eliot but did not achieve the same level of recognition. Nick Havey, reviewing the work for the Washington Independent Review of Books, said the work metaphorically shows "her life and legacy in vivid Technicolor" and although the book can jump around too quickly, the attention it pays to so many varied moments of her life is great for piquing readers' interest. Djuna was a finalist for the 2025 Lambda Literary Award for Bisexual Nonfiction. Djuna received two Eisner award nominations: Best reality based work, and Best Writer/Artist.

== Bibliography ==
=== Comics ===
- Tropo #1-8 (1991–1993, Blackbird Comics)
- Nefarismo #1-8 (1994–1995, Eros Comix)
- Meatmen #16-21 (1994–1998, Leyland Publications)
- Gay Comics #23 and 25 "Personal ADventuring" and "Secret Self" (Bob Ross)
- Wilde Magazine #1-3 "Garth" (1995 PDA Press)
- Steam Vol. 1, Issue 3 - Vol. 3, issue 4 "Hot Water" (1994–1996, PDA Press)
- Negative Burn #43 "Snow Cone", writer Aldyth Beltane (1997, Caliber Comics)
- Titanium Lover webcomic (1997, Titan Media)
- International Leatherman #25-30 "Midnight Sons" (1999–2000, Brushcreek Media)
- Bunkhouse # 17-29 "Tailblazer" (1997–2000, Brushcreek Media)
- Book of Boy Trouble Vol. 2 "Crazy in Bed" (2008, Green Candy Press)
- Glamazonia "Rentboy Year One", writer Justin Hall (2010, Northwest Press) ISBN 978-0984594016
- THREE #2 "Dragon", writer Sina Evil (2011, Robert Kirby)
- Fearful Hunter #1-3 (2010–2012, Jon Macy)
- New Years to Christmas: 15 Queer Holiday Tales "Happy Family Moment" (2012, Digital Fabulists) ISBN 978-0615733302
- Gay City: Volume 5: Ghosts In Gaslight, Monsters In Steam "Paper Lantern" (2013, Minor Arcana Press and Gay City Health Project) ISBN 978-1489580146
- No Straight Lines: Four Decades of Queer Comics "Teleny and Camille, excerpt" (2013, Fantagraphics) ISBN 978-1-60699-718-5
- Qu33r "Obsessive Repulsive" (2013, Northwest Press) ISBN 978-1938720369
- ALPHABET the LGBTQAIU creators from Prism Comics (2016, Stacked Deck Press) ISBN 978-0-9970487-1-1
- RFD Number 165 Spring 2016 (RFD) ISSN 0149-709X
- The Shirley Jackson Project edited by Robert Kirby (2016, Ninth Art Press)

=== Movies ===
- Fallen Angel DVD, interstice illustrations (1997, Titan Media)

=== Novels ===
- Teleny and Camille (2010, Northwest Press) ISBN 978-0-9845940-0-9
- Fearful Hunter the complete epic (2014, Northwest Press) ISBN 978-1938720543
- "Djuna: The Extraordinary Life of Djuna Barnes" (2024, Street Noise Books) ISBN 978-1951491338

=== Coloring Books ===
- The Queer Heroes Coloring Book (2016, Stacked Deck Press)
- Butch Lesbians of the 20s 30s and 40s Coloring Book (2017, Stacked Deck Press) ISBN 978-0-9970487-6-6
- Butch Lesbians of the 50s 60s and 70s Coloring Book (2018, Stacked Deck Press) ISBN 978-0997048797
- "Polyamory Coloring and Activity Book" (2023, Stacked Deck Press ISBN 979-8988399209
