= David Kelly (comic artist) =

American cartoonist and comics creator (born 1965)

David Kelly (born December 17, 1965) is an American cartoonist and comics creator. He is best known for his strip, Steven's Comics, which ran in LGBT and alternative newspapers and zines from 1994 to 1998. His strip has won the Xeric award and he has worked alongside critically acclaimed cartoonist Robert Kirby. He and Kirby co-edited the gay comics zine series Boy Trouble.

== Steven's Comics ==
Steven's Comics is set in the 1970s and tells the story of a young gay boy named Steven who draws comics about a super-heroine named Starwoman. Kelly's work is celebrated for its authenticity and emotional nuance.

All of Steven's Comics has been compiled into an anthology graphic novel titled Rainy Day Recess: The Complete Steven's Comics, published by Northwest Press, with foreword by Dan Savage and some exclusive material made specifically for the volume. Before that, there were several other compilation volumes. The original Xeric award-winning compilation was Steven's Comics #3: We Are Family. The others are Steven's Comics #1: Premiere Edition!, Steven's Comics #2/Starwoman Comics, and Steven's Comics #4: New Best Friend.

== Publications ==
=== Anthologies ===
- The Book of Boy Trouble: Gay Boy Comics with a New Attitude ISBN 978-1931160452
- Rainy Day Recess: The Complete Steven's Comics ISBN 978-0984594023

=== Contributions ===
- Seattle Arts, A Publication of the Seattle Arts Commission June 1991, 'The Bus Ride'.
- Boy Trouble #2, 3, 4, 5 ISBN 9780974885506
- Gay Comics #23, 25 ISBN 0-452-26229-1
- Juicy Mother 2: How They Met, edited by Jennifer Camper, Manic D Press, 2007 ISBN 978-1-933149-20-2
- Young Bottoms In Love, edited by Tim Fish, Poison Press, 2007 ISBN 978-0-9762786-7-2
- No Straight Lines: Four Decades of Queer Comics, edited by Justin Hall, Fantagraphics, 2012 ISBN 978-1-60699-506-8
- QU33R ISBN 9781938720369
- The Stranger
- Three #2 ISBN 9780615480619
- Unsafe for All Ages 2
