= Roberta Gregory =

American comic book writer and artist (born 1953)

- Born: May 7, 1953 (age 73) Los Angeles, California, U.S.
- Area: Cartoonist
- Notable works: Naughty Bits
- Awards: Inkpot Award (1994)

Roberta Gregory (born May 7, 1953) is an American comic book writer and artist best known for the character Bitchy Bitch from her Fantagraphics Books series Naughty Bits. She is a prolific contributor to many feminist and underground anthologies, such as Wimmen's Comix and Gay Comix.

== Career ==
=== Early life ===
While attending college, Gregory was exposed to the underground comix movement, one of the first times she had seen widespread works by female comic artists. At school, she contributed full-page strips called "Frieda the Feminist" and other artwork to Phil Yeh's campus humor paper, Uncle Jam, as well as art for the Women's Resource Center newsletter.

=== Wimmin’s Comix and Gay Comix (1974-1990) ===
Gregory began her career in earnest in 1974 by sending a strip titled "A Modern Romance" to the all-female Wimmen's Comix anthology. She also created the strip Feminist Funnies in 1974, expanding it in 1976 for her own original comic book Dynamite Damsels, after it was rejected by Wimmen's Comix due to an alleged similarity to her other work. Dynamite Damsels was the first continuing series self published comic by a woman. Gregory has commented on this, stating that she was unaware of the groundbreaking nature of her work at the time of publishing.

She continued to contribute to many other underground comix in the 1970s, including Gay Comix (later renamed Gay Comics) and Robert Kirby's Strange Looking Exile. She is the most prolific contributor to Gay Comix, having appeared in nearly every one of its 25 issues.

=== Naughty Bits and Bitchy Bitch (1990-2004) ===
In 1990 Gregory created "Bitchy Bitch" Midge McCracken, a woman angry at the world who frequently explodes with rage. She starred in the 40-issue series Naughty Bits, which was published by Fantagraphics from 1991 to 2004. Beginning in 2001, a series of shorts featuring Bitchy Bitch called Bitchy Bits was shown on the Oxygen Network animated series X-Chromosome. Life's a Bitch, an animated series spun-off from the X-Chromosome shorts, aired from 2003 to 2004 on Oxygen in the U.S. and on The Comedy Network in Canada.

In Gay Comix #15, Gregory introduced the character Bitchy Butch, a lesbian counterpart to Bitchy Bitch. This character continued to appear in later issues of Gay Comix as well as in Diva, and Naughty Bits. In 1999, all the Bitchy Butch strips were compiled in a collection titled Bitchy Butch: World’s Angriest Dyke, published by Fantagraphics. This collection also includes 10 pages of previously unpublished Bitchy Butch material.

Gregory's other work includes the fantasy graphic novel Winging It (a spinoff of a comic she wrote for Gay Comix), the 3-issue series Artistic Licentiousness, and the comic strip Sheila and the Unicorn.

=== (2004-present) ===
Much of Gregory's recent work has focused on illustrated stories of her own and others' cats. Real Cat Toons was initially published as a fundraiser for her cat's medical bills, but was republished with additional material under the title True Cat Toons.

She is one of the contributors to Free to Fight, the interactive self-defense project for women.

She is currently working to complete Mother Mountain, the first chapter of which is available to read free on her website. Originally conceived as a spin-off from Winging It, Gregory has been working sporadically on it since the 1990s. Though it began as a graphic novel, she eventually chose to begin again, limiting it to text only. Gregory has stated that the story will span four novels, two of which are complete. She has also planned to complete a graphic novel prequel. Describing its content, Gregory states that the work is a fantasy romance which deals with the consequences of choices made in youth.

== Awards and recognition ==
- Eisner Award, 1992. Naughty Bits nominated for Best Humor Publication
- Harvey Awards, 1992. Naughty Bits nominated for Best New Series
- Eisner Award, 1993. Naughty Bits #6 strip "Hippie Bitch Gets Laid" nominated for Best Short Story, Gregory nominated for both Best Writer and Best Writer/Artist.
- Eisner Award, 1994. Naughty Bits #6-8 strip "The Abortion Trilogy" nominated for Best Serialized Story. Gregory nominated for Best Writer/Artist.
- Inkpot Award, Comic-Con International, 1994.
- Toonie Award, Cartoonists Northwest, 1998. Received the Golden Toonie for her achievements as a Pacific Northwest cartoonist.
- Eisner Award, 2000. Naughty Bits #28 strip "Bye-Bye, Muffy" nominated for Best Short Story.
- Haxtur Award, Salon Internacional del Principado de Asturias, 2003. Received the Haxtur for Humor for A Bitch is Born. The collection was also nominated for Best Short Comic Strip, the same year.
- Lulu Award, 2006. Gregory inducted into the Women Cartoonists Hall of Fame for Naughty Bits and Artistic Licentiousness.

== Personal life ==
Gregory was born in Los Angeles, California, to Disney comics writer and artist Bob Gregory.

In 1971, she began college at California State University, Long Beach, where she was exposed to the feminist movement and comic influences such as Nanny Goat Productions members Joyce Farmer and Lyn Chevli. She contributed to her college humor paper until 1974, when she began her own Feminist Funnies.

She moved to Seattle, Washington in 1989, where she resided with her long-term partner, author Bruce B. Taylor, until his death in 2022. Though she chooses not to use labels with regards to her sexuality, Gregory is a long time participant in bisexual newsletter North Bi Northwest and other LGBTQ organizations.

In addition to her comics, Gregory has been employed in many different day jobs, such as a marine biologist, production artist, market researcher, and most recently, a maintenance worker at McCaw Hall.

== Bibliography ==
=== Comics and graphic novels ===
- Dynamite Damsels (self-published, 1976) — 2 issues
- Sheila and the Unicorn (Solo Productions, 1988)
- Winging It (Solo Productions, 1988)
- Artistic Licentiousness (Starhead Comix, 1991–1994) — 3 issues
- Naughty Bits (Fantagraphics, 1991–2004) — 40 issues
- Winging It 2 (self-published, 1999)
- Follow Your Art: Roberta's Comic Trips (Landis Review, 2011) ISBN 0-9619652-4-X

=== Collections ===
- A Bitch is Born: Adventures of Midge the Bitchy Bitch (Fantagraphics, 1994) ISBN 978-1560971566
- Naughty Bits vol. 2: As Naughty as She Wants to Be (Fantagraphics 1996) ISBN 978-1560971825 — collecting material considered too controversial for the first Naughty Bits collection
- At Work and Play with Bitchy Bitch (Fantagraphics, 1996) ISBN 978-1560973065 — material from Naughty Bits #10-14
- Bitchy's College Daze: Adventures of Midge the Bitchy Bitch (Fantagraphics, 1998) ISBN 978-1560972778— stories from Naughty Bits #15-19
- Bitchy Butch: World's Angriest Dyke (Fantagraphics, 1999) ISBN 978-1560973492 — stories from Naughty Bits #21, 23, 26, and stories from Gay Comix
- Bitchy Strips (self-published, 2001) — one-shot collection of weekly strips previously published in alternative weeklies such as the Seattle Weekly and Willamette Week
- Burn Bitchy Burn (Fantagraphics, 2002) ISBN 978-1560974925
- Life's a Bitch: Complete Bitchy Bitch Stories (Fantagraphics, 2005) ISBN 978-1560976561 — first half of Bitchy Bitch stories plus one new story
- True Cat Toons (self-published, 2014)
- Bitchy! The Exasperating Existence of Midge McCracken (Fantagraphics, 2026)

=== Contributions ===
Gregory's work has appeared in the following anthologies:

- Wimmen's Comix (Later collected into The Complete Wimmen's Comix). Published by Last Gasp (1972–1985), Renegade Press (1987–1988), and Rip Off Press (1989–1992). Gregory appears in issues #4, 7, 10, 14, and 16.
- Tits and Clits Comix. Edited by Joyce Farmer and Lyn Chevli, published Nanny Goat Productions and Last Gasp (1972–1987). Gregory appears in issues #3, 4, and 6.
- Gay Comix (Later 'Gay Comics'). Edited by Howard Cruise, Robert Triptow, and Andy Mangels, published by Kitchen Sink Press (1980–1984) and Bob Ross (1985–1998). Gregory appears in issues #1-7, 10–17, 20–21, 23, and 25.
- Strip AIDS USA. Edited by Trina Robbins, Bill Sienkiewicz, and Robert Triptow, published by Last Gasp (1988).
- Choices: A Pro Choice Benefit Comic. Edited by Trina Robbins, published by Angry Isis Press (1990).
- Real Stuff. Edited by Dennis Eichhorn, published by Fantagraphics Books (1990–1994). Gregory appears in issues #2-10 and #14.
- Real Smut. Published by Fantagraphics Books (1990). Gregory appears in issues #1 and #5.
- Aesop's Fables. Published by Fantagraphics Books (1991). Gregory appears in issues #2 and #3.
- Strange Looking Exile. Edited by Robert Kirby (1991–1994).
- Love and Rockets. Published by Fantagraphic Books. Gregory appears in issue #2 and #31.
- The Gauntlet: Exploring the Limits of Free Expression! Edited by Barry Hoffman, published by Gauntlet Press (1992). Gregory appears in the issue "Media Manipulation."
- Duplex Planet Illustrated. Edited by Barbara Price, founded by David Greenberger, published by Fantagraphics Books (1993–1995). Gregory appears in issues #1 and #4.
- Skunk. Edited by Edd Vick, published by MU Press (1993).
- Real Girl. Edited by Angela Bocage, published by Fantagraphics Books (1990–1997). Gregory appears in issues #3 and #5.
- ZU. Published by MU Press (1995–1996).
- Graphic Story Daily. Published by Fantagraphics Books.
- Dyke Strippers. Edited by Roz Warren, published by Cleis Press (1995).
- Road Strips. Published by Chronicle Books (2005).
- Sexy Chix. Published by Dark Horse Comics (2006).
- Tales of the Slug. Published Windstorm Creative (2006).
- The Girl's Guide to Guy Stuff. Published by Friends of Lulu (2007).
- No Straight Lines. Edited by Justin Hall, published by Fantagraphic Books (2012).

=== In other media ===
- Free to Fight is a project consisting of a 1995 double album and booklet, and a single later released by Candy Ass Records.
- Bitchy Bits, a series of shorts featuring Bitchy Bitch, was shown on the Oxygen Network animated series X-Chromosome beginning in 2001.
- Life's a Bitch, an animated series spun-off from the X-Chromosome shorts, aired from 2003 to 2004 on Oxygen in the U.S. and on The Comedy Network in Canada.
