= Stuck Rubber Baby =

1995 graphic novel

- Creator: Howard Cruse
- Date: 1995
- Page count: 210 pages
- Publisher: Paradox Press

Stuck Rubber Baby is a 1995 graphic novel by American cartoonist Howard Cruse. He created his debut graphic novel after a decades-long career as an underground cartoonist. It deals with homosexuality and racism in the 1960s in the southern United States, in the midst of the civil rights movement. While the book is not autobiographical, it draws upon Cruse's experience of growing up in the South during this time period, including his accidental fathering of a child, as referred to in the title.

== Background ==
Howard Cruse was born in 1940s Alabama to a Baptist preacher and his wife. He earned a degree in drama and worked in television before turning to a cartooning career. From 1971 he published a strip called Barefootz, which appeared in a number of underground comix publications, including three issues under its own title. Cruse's contemporaries gave it little regard, deeming it too cute and gentle compared to the countercultural works alongside which it ran. In 1976, Cruse introduced a gay character into the strip, committing to the gay liberation movement.

In 1979 Denis Kitchen of Kitchen Sink Press invited Cruse to edit the comic-book anthology Gay Comix; the first issue appeared in 1980. From 1983 to 1989 Cruse produced Wendel, an ongoing humorous comic strip for the LGBTQ magazine The Advocate.

== Publication history ==
Piranha Press, an imprint of DC Comics for alternative comics, contracted with Cruse for a graphic novel. It gave him an advance against royalties to cover expenses for the two years projected to finish the book; it ultimately took four years. When his finances became tight, Cruse took time away from the book to raise funds by applying for grants and selling original art pages from the book before they were drawn. Piranha Press was discontinued in 1994, before Cruse finished the book. It was instead published by DC's Paradox Press imprint in 1995 in hardcover, and in paperback in 1996 by HarperCollins. In 2010, DC published a new edition under its Vertigo imprint. Cruse's agents Denis Kitchen and John Lind moved the book to First Second Books, which published a 25th Anniversary edition in 2020, incorporating unpublished material from Cruse's archives; the book was released a few months after his death.

Playwright Tony Kushner wrote an introduction to the first edition. Cartoonist Alison Bechdel contributed an introduction to the 2010 reprint edition. Translations have been published in French, (Note: As Un monde de différence.) German, (Note: As Am Rande des Himmels.) Italian, (Note: As Figlio di un preservativo bucato.) Polish, and Spanish. (Note: As Stuck Rubber Baby: Mundos diferentes.)

== Plot summary ==
Decades after the book's events, the forty-something Toland Polk narrates his youth in the fictional town of Clayfield, in the American South in the 1950s and 1960s. After his parents die in a car accident, he finds he has no direction. He chooses to work for a gas station rather than go to college.

Polk becomes involved with the black community and the civil rights movement. At the same time, he courts a folk singer named Ginger in the hopes of "curing" his homosexuality. Together they have a child they give up for adoption. Polk finds the black community more accepting of his homosexuality than his own white community. The bombing of a black community center, the lynching of a gay friend, and other such events push him to social activism.

== Style and analysis ==
The dense black-and-white artwork is more restrained and less cartoony than that of Cruse's earlier work. Cruse abandons his trademark stippling for heavily crosshatching. He gives particular attention to buildings and other background details, and to rendering characters with individuality. Ben Bolling likens the rounded rendering of the figures to those in the paintings of American artist Paul Cadmus. The pages are dense with dialogue balloons.

The frame story, set off with rounded panel borders, takes place in the late 1980s or early 1990s, as the adult Toland narrates with his male partner by his side. The narration appears to occur over a substantial span of time, as the pair's clothing and background reflect seasonal changes from summer to winter.

== Overview ==
The story is not autobiographical, but Cruse draws from his experiences growing up in Birmingham, Alabama. He also includes such historical events as the 1955 murder of Emmett Till in Mississippi and the 16th Street Baptist Church bombing in Birmingham in 1963.

In an interview with Comic Book Resources, Cruse said that he based the novel on his own experiences in the 1960s and his "anger at the degree to which the ideals of the Civil Rights Era were being abandoned".

In another interview, Cruse stated: "My goal was to create the kind of novel that is too full of incident for someone to simply summarize in their mind in one sentence. I wanted it to be like life, where you spend a year of your life and you can't just remember everything that happened, but it's all part of a process".

=== Character list ===
- Toland Polk, the main character/protagonists
- Melanie, Toland's sister
- Orley, Melanie's husband
- Stetson, an elderly handyman/gardener who worked for the Toland family
- Ben, Stetson's son
- Ginger Raines, Toland's old girlfriend
- Riley Wheeler, Toland's friend
- Mavis Greene, Riley's girlfriend
- Sammy Noone, a longtime gay friend of Mavis & Riley
- Lester Pepper, the gay son of preacher Harland Pepper
- Reverend Harland Pepper, a preacher and nonviolent social activist
- Anna Dellyne Pepper, a former New York singer and the preacher's wife
- Shiloh Reed, a singer who suffers from brain damage following an accident
- Lottie, Shiloh's wife, who has cancer
- Sledge Rankin, a black person who is murdered by the KKK
- Robert Samson, a friend and bisexual lover
- Esmo "Esmereldus", a drag queen
- Mabel Older, a piano player and Effie's sister
- Cindy Neuworth, Mabel's younger, "butchy" girlfriend
- Marge, a lesbian, Effie's partner and co-owner of Alleysax
- Effie, Marge's partner and co-owner of Alleysax and Mabel's sister
- Father Edgar Morris, another preacher in town

== Reception and legacy ==
Stuck Rubber Baby was published with high expectations, given the success of Art Spiegelman's graphic novel Maus (1991). Stuck Rubber Baby won a favorable critical reception, but its sales were modest.

The book won the award for Best Graphic Novel at the Eisners, Harveys, and UK Comic Art Awards. It was nominated for the American Library Association's Lesbian and Gay Book Award and the Lambda Literary Award. It was given the 1995 Comics Creators Guild Award for Best Graphic Album in the UK. It won the 2002 French Prix de la critique and the Luche award in Germany.

Comics writer Harvey Pekar wrote that, if enough people read it, "it surely will help convince the general public that comics can appeal to adults". Upon its reprinting in 2011, ComicsAlliance wrote that Cruse "harnessed a symphony of discordant subtleties". Cartoonist and comics scholar Justin Hall wrote of the importance of this work: "Stuck Rubber Baby, with its complex meditations on race, sexuality, and gender in the Civil Rights era Alabama is perhaps the closest we've come yet to the Great American Graphic Novel".

The book has generated some controversy because of its subject matter. In 2004, a Texas citizens' group asked that it be removed from the young adult section of the local library.

Cruse's earlier work influenced Alison Bechdel in her comic strip Dykes to Watch Out For. She later published the graphic novels Fun Home (2006) and Are You My Mother? (2012), which also deal with an individual's homosexual awakening.
