= Barc =

Barc or BARC may refer to:

== Institutions ==
- Bay Area Reference Center, a former US public library service
- Beltsville Agricultural Research Center
- Bhabha Atomic Research Centre, an Indian nuclear research facility
- Bradford Amateur Rowing Club
- British Automobile Racing Club
- BARC, the stock symbol of Barclays on the London Stock Exchange
- Broadcast Audience Research Council, television audience measurement service in India
- Bureau of Animal Regulation and Care, the City of Houston animal control and animal shelter agency

== Vessels and vehicles ==
- Barque
- BARC speeder, a fictional vehicle in the Star Wars universe
- BARC from "Barge, Amphibious, Resupply, Cargo" vehicle; aka LARC-LX

== Places ==
- Barc, Eure, a French commune in the Eure department
- Barç, a village in Korçë County, Albania
