= Tits & Clits Comix =

All-female underground comics anthology

- The cover of Tits & Clits #1, art by Joyce Farmer.

Publication information
- Publisher: Nanny Goat Productions; Last Gasp
- Schedule: Irregular
- Format: Ongoing series
- Publication date: July 1972 - Nov. 1987
- No. of issues: 7
- Editor(s): Joyce Farmer, Lyn Chevli

Tits & Clits Comix is an all-female underground comics anthology put together by Joyce Farmer and Lyn Chevli, published from 1972 to 1987. In addition to Farmer and Chevli, contributors to Tits & Clits included Roberta Gregory, Lee Marrs, and Trina Robbins.

Along with such titles as It Aint Me, Babe and Wimmen's Comix, Tits & Clits was part of a movement by female cartoonists to counter the male-dominated, often blatantly misogynistic, works of the underground. With the conviction that sex was political, the series was created with the focus of sexuality from a female perspective.

== Publication history ==
Seeing what they perceived as the inherent sexism of the mostly male-underground comix scene, as well as the phoniness of mainstream pornographic magazines like Playboy and Penthouse, Farmer and Chevli published Tits & Clits (under the publisher name Nanny Goat Productions) as a sex-positive feminist comic. The first issue appeared in July 1972, preceding Wimmen's Comix by a few months. In addition to Tits & Clits, the duo also produced a one-shot comic about reproductive rights, Abortion Eve, in 1973.

The first issue of Tits & Clits sold out of its first printing of 20,000 copies by the next year. Because the series' title limited its exposure, the second issue appeared in 1973 under the title Pandoras Box Comix (sic - apostrophe omitted). Condemned by many feminists (even other cartoonists), as well as the expected antagonism from male underground cartoonists, Tits & Clits also suffered from a 1973 pornography investigation by the Orange County, California, district attorney's office.

The series returned to its original title in 1976, with a new issue #2. Farmer and Chevli published three issues of Tits & Clits on their own from 1972 to 1987 (often in print runs of 10,000–20,000). The title was opened up to other contributors starting with issue #3. Chevli stopped contributing after the third issue, but continued as co-editor through the sixth.

San Francisco underground publisher Last Gasp picked the title up for its final four issues, which were published intermittently between 1977 and 1987. The final issue, #7, was published seven years after issue #6, and featured work by a number of younger cartoonists, part of a new generation of female alternative cartoonists. Mary Fleener acted as the co-editor along with Farmer. It also featured a story by Dennis Worden, the only male cartoonist to contribute to Tits & Clits.

In 2023, Fantagraphics Books issued Tits & Clits, 1972–1987, a hardcover collection of the series.

== Contributors ==
- Joyce Farmer (as "Joyce Sutton") — founding contributor/editor
- Lyn Chevli (a.k.a. Lyn Chevely) (as "Chin Lyvely") — founding contributor/editor
- Carla Abbotts
- Joyce Brabner
- Dot Bucher
- Corrine Petteys (aka Comicazie)
- Tee Corinne (as "Cory")
- Joey Epstein
- Karen Feinberg
- Miriam Flambe
- Mary Fleener
- Melinda Gebbie
- Paula Gray
- Roberta Gregory
- Beverly Hilliard
- Julie Hollings (as "Jewelz")
- Michelle Jurris
- Krystine Kryttre
- Ruth Lynn
- Jennifer Malik
- Lee Marrs
- Carel Moiseiwitsch
- Chris Powers
- Terry Richards
- Trina Robbins
- Sharon Rudahl
- Shelby Sampson
- Dori Seda
- Leslie Sternbergh
- Luna Ticks
- Joanne Kunz (as "Rocky Trout")
- Dennis Worden
