= Sina Shamsavari =

Queer zine author and lecturer

- Born: 1976 October 22; Manchester, UK
- Other names: Sina Sparrow, Sina Evil
- Education: Kings College
- Occupation: Lecturer at the London College of Fashion
- Notable work: Boy Crazy Boy, Concerned Muthers, Art Fag
- Website: https://www.sinasparrow.co.uk/

Sina Shamsavari (born October 22, 1976) is a comic artist and author in the queer punk zine movement. Born in Manchester, Shamsavari grew up in an environment hostile towards queer identity. He has published queer zines and comics such as Art Fag, Boy Crazy Boy, Concerned Muthers, Dirty Mind, and Pretty Boys Ignore You. His work has been included in anthologies including No Straight Lines, Publish You and QU33R.

Sina Shamsavari earned a Doctorate in Philosophy from King's College, London, with the thesis Gay Comics and Queer Male Alternative Comics in America: History, Conventions, and Challenges. He currently works as a lecturer in Cultural and Historical Studies at the London College of Fashion. Shamsavari studies and writes about the history and importance of queer zines and comics. He examines the works of authors such as Robert Kirby and Jon Macy.

== Early life ==
Shamsavari was born in 1976 in Manchester, UK, to Iranian parents. Growing up during a time where homophobia was prevalent, at 16 years old, Shamsavari was influenced by Trina Robbins, Robert Kirby, Jon Macy, and Larry-Bob Roberts to start publishing queer zines.

== Career ==
Shamsavari began publishing during the queer punk movement, which emerged in the 1980s and thrived in the 1990s. This movement aimed to challenge hetero-normative thinking and conventional punk behavior. Contributions to this subculture not only included zines and comics, but also music, books, and other forms of media. In an interview with Beige Magazine, Shamsavari emphasized diversity, stating: "it's important for people from different backgrounds to take an active role in creating their own culture, and not simply taking in what mainstream media promotes". His end goal was to "put more idiosyncratic and interesting" comics on the market.

Beginning with Concerned Muthers, Shamsavari later published Atomic Love, Boy Crazy Boy, and appeared in anthologies such as Robert Kirby's Book of Boy Trouble. A lot of Shamsavari's works, especially Boy Crazy Boy, center around the necessity to elaborate on the experience of growing up queer in a hostile world. His comics strove to legitimize and normalize being queer in the 1990s.

In addition to his comics, Shamsavari has also worked in illustration for companies such as Healthy Gay Living Centre, Glam, and the Terrence Higgins Trust.

== Notable works ==
=== Concerned Muthers ===
An anthology comic marketed towards "queer teens and straight mates." Ran for 7 issues and had supernatural stories with demons and fairies. Laurence Roberts, the author of Holy Titclamps published 'Concerned Muthers' in one of his queer zine explosions.

=== Boy Crazy Boy ===
An autobiographical comic regarded as his most popular work. It took a humorous tone while addressing the real thoughts, troubles, and instances of a queer man in the 1990s.

=== Art Fag (UK) ===
A self-published series in which Shamsavari humorously recounts moments from his daily life. It blends moments of romantic life with family life.
