= M'bwebwe =

The M'bwebwe painters and poets originally met while attending Kent State University in the U.S. state of Ohio in the mid-1970s. They include painters David Wayne Cole, Thomas David Little (1955–2006), and James F. Quinlan, sculptor Christopher Cosma, computer artist Jeff Brice, and multi-media artists Peter Brill and Mark Bloch. The group soon grew to include others, including Douglas Ferguson, Sylvia Sherry, Susan Cole, Lauren Silver, Anka Itskovich, Nan Truitt and John Fletcher.

According to the group's account, the name M'bwebwe was coined spontaneously and had no intended meaning. It was uttered at random one day, although who uttered it is now forgotten, when it was time to select a name for a particular event and it stuck. It has since come to represent either a place or a group of artists, depending on usage.

IM'bwebwe as a geographical location existed from 1979 to 1982. The living quarters and studios, located above a Jewish monument store in a former B'nai B'rith meeting hall, soon became a de facto exhibition space, dance club and neighborhood hangout that garnered attention by hipsters and cognoscenti around the rapidly changing area soon to be known as the East Village.

While the M'bwebwe painting style held craftsmanship in high esteem, the subject matter could be described as irreverent, Dada-inspired, tongue-in-cheek and funky. A number of musical projects, most notably by Quinlan, Brill, Little and Bloch, took the funk idea back to its roots as a musical style (see George Clinton, James Brown and Robert Wyatt) that was blended with elements of Devo and Pere Ubu, both associated with the post-punk and new wave scenes. M'bwebwe is also linked to predecessors such as Dada, Surrealism, Fluxus, concept art, punk, industrial music, and electropop, and most importantly, 'pataphysics.

The M'bwebwe group is less a style of art or music than a loosely-knit group of artists from the midwest with a likeminded penchant for the Gabba Gabba Hey sensibility that could be heard emanating from the club CBGB located just behind the M'bwebwe space on Second Avenue. M'bwebwe the geographical location existed from 1979 to 1982. Most of the original participants still reside in New York City. One of the founders of the group, Tom Little, a painter musician and master printmaker, died in 2006 due to natural causes. Christopher Cosma died December 5, 2025.

The University of Iowa Libraries' collection of The Ruth and Marvin Sackner Archive of Concrete and Visual Poetry is the holder of a 1992 work of art called "M-Bru-Bru" by Mark Bloch, a 29 x 20 x 18 cm painted wooden crate originally containing Bru-Bru brand Clementine oranges, filled with red painted corrugated cardboard "pages."

Mbwebwe is an African surname. Mbwebwe Province is the home of George of the Jungle.
