= Mark Bloch (artist) =

American artist

Mark Bloch (born 1956) is an American conceptual artist, mail artist, performance artist, visual artist, archivist and writer whose work combines visuals, and text as well as performance and media to explore ideas of long-distance communication, including across time.

== Early years and education ==
Mark Bloch was born to American parents in Würzburg, West Germany, in 1956 where his father was based as a soldier of the US Army. Bloch grew up in Cleveland and then Akron, Ohio. Exposure in his youth to Robert Wyatt, the Fugs, and Yoko Ono and the unexpected discovery of Frank Zappa's album Freak Out! in his junior high school library led to an interest in the fringes of art. Coincidentally, Bloch later referred to his mentor Ray Johnson as the "fringe of the fringe."

Bloch attended Kent State University, where he was influenced by faculty members Adrian DeWitt, a Jungian who taught in the Romance Languages department, Robert Schimmel and Robert Culley, another Jungian, in the School of Art, Robert West in the Telecommunications Department and finally, visiting artists Joan Jonas from New York and Takahiko Iimura from Japan, both videographers. Bloch attended Kent in the aftermath of the 1970 Kent State shootings and was present during protests of a gymnasium that was built on the site of that incident in the late 1970s. Following his work with Jonas, and switching his focus from art to TV, Bloch received his B.A. degree in Broadcasting and was the creator of a "punk" performance art movement called The New Irreverence and other avant-garde provocations. Bloch was part of the M'bwebwe group that began in Kent, Ohio in 1974.

After Kent, Bloch moved to Southern California, experimenting with performance, studying with artist Rachel Rosenthal, and supporting himself as a maker of corporate communications for corporate clients from 1978 to 1982. He continued these activities in Manhattan from 1982 to 1990, moving later into print media and then web design while continuing to work in performance art and mail art.

Bloch performed "Heart and Technology" and "East Meats West" in Laguna Beach, California where he lived until 1981. On November 16, 1980, Bloch produced an early issue of his D.I.Y. zine, Panmag, numbered "451" in honor of the famed Fahrenheit 451 Books bookstore inviting visitors to create work which he later mailed and spending the day "in the window of the bookstore working on his postal art magazine," performing a work called "Artist for Sale," in which he made himself available to "buy or rent" for "$10,000 an hour." Bloch also typed on a typewriter in the window and gave a lecture on his "Postal Art Network" and its relationship to Laguna's status as an "art colony."

After moving to New York City in 1982, he met many of the Sixties generation of avant-garde artists whom he had long been studying in written form, artistic heirs to the legacy of Marcel Duchamp such as Dick Higgins and Alison Knowles, Jackson MacLow, Al Hansen, Nam June Paik and others. Bloch also met Ray Johnson who had heard of Bloch's mailed performance art pieces and invited him into his New York Correspondence School.

In 2012, after studying Digital Marketing, Bloch received a Master of Science degree from the Zicklin School of Business, Baruch College, City University of New York.

== Graphic Design ==
Since 1978, Bloch has worked in various jobs related to the graphic design industry. From 1978 to 1990 he created slide shows for corporate clients in the audio-visual industry. Through the 1990s and into the new millennium, he worked at various publications including Rolling Stone and CosmoGirl and participated in early cyberspace efforts for The New York Times, and ABCNews. Bloch helped create "Themes of the Times," among the earliest New Media projects at The New York Times and Bloch worked creating interactive maps and graphics for ABCNews.com at a time when it was jointly owned and operated by Paul Allen's Starwave and Internet news was still being invented. Bloch also wrote several articles for ABCNews.com and other Starwave-owned sites including features on art, music and animation.

== Mail Art and Pre-Digital Networking ==
Since 1980, Bloch has published Panmag, his mail art-related zine which documented much of the activity of the New York mail art scene in the 1980s and beyond including the visits of various mail artists to New York, his travel in Europe and opinions about the goings on in the fringes of the art world. Bloch's writings on Fluxus, performance, communication, Conceptual art, mail art and contemporary art are referred to on mail art-related blogs. In 1984, Bloch published details of his mail art practice in "The P.A.N. Project" in the "Mail Art Then and Now" issue of the "Franklin Furnace Flue," edited by Dr. Ronny Cohen.

Later, in an "Open Letter to the Network," in Art Papers magazine, Bloch offered a "critique of mail artists’ relations with the existing gallery system, attempting to distinguish 'the differences... between mail art and certified art.' While calling on mail artists to 'ask the difficult questions' and 'digress from the backslapping that is so prevalent in mail art,' Bloch's proposals are limited to an exhortation to 'pursue a more rigorous dialogue than exists right now.' Bloch asserts that 'we concentrate on content rather than appearance.'"

In "Offener brief an jeden im netzwerk" (Open Letter to everyone in the Network) Bloch and visiting mail artist H. R. Fricker of Trogen, Switzerland created a six-point manifesto in English and German that highlighted the importance of person to person correspondence in the mail art network, as opposed to mail art shows, which were increasing in popularity at that time. This focus on the "communicative processes arising from the exchanges between... artists" was shared by Bloch and Fricker and many of the other mail artists who entered the fray in the late 70s and early 80s.

Fricker and Bloch's bi-lingual "Phantastische Gebete Revisited," with its title referring to a famous dada tome translated as "Fantastic Prayers," stated, "1) An important function of the exhibitions and other group projects in the network is: to open channels to other human beings. 2) After your exhibition is shown and the documentation sent, or after you have received such a documentation with a list of addresses, use the channels! 3) Create person-to-person correspondence... 4) You have your own unique energy which you can give to others through your work: visual audio, verbal, etc. 5) This energy is best used when it is exchanged for energy from another person with the same intentions. 6) The power of the network is in the quality of the direct correspondence, not the quantity." The manifesto concludes, "We have learned this from our own mistakes."

Bloch participated in several "Tourism" mail art congresses of 1986 and attended the Neoist Festival of Plagiarism in Glasgow and other events in 1989 but felt that two events of that nature were enough so he decided to "boycott the 1992 congress year" as well as the "incongruous meetings year 1998," opting, instead, for a "year of decompression" in 2004 that was eventually manifested instead of Congress participation.

Bloch's work both parodied and penetrated avant garde circles with his writings on Neoism, Stewart Home and the Festival of Plagiarism in Issue 28 of his zine Panmag, subtitled "The Last Word" in which he proposed a Word Strike which put forth the oft-repeated motto of that period, "Don't say art unless you mean money." Bloch later pushed that emphasis in the Panscan area of the EchoNYC Communication teleconferencing system.

Bloch is a vehement defender in online communities of the purity of the Fluxus generation that preceded him, insisting that his contemporaries are free to be influenced by what he calls the Fluxus "movement" (as opposed to those who see it as an open-ended "spirit" or "attitude") but should not call themselves or their work "Fluxus" directly. "Mark Bloch’s views on the current situation of Fluxus in the mail art network (as well as newer generation artists who call themselves Fluxus) can and do generate heated debate." Bloch calls the overuse of the word "Fluxus" by younger artists "misinformation" and a distortion of the historical record.

== Early cyber-migration and Ray Johnson's research ==
Since 1980, Bloch has published a zine called Panmag and tried to use it in various ways to push back the boundaries of what art can be. Bloch "situates his practices within the new expanded field of publishing. As the editor of Panmag, he has combined both digital and traditional media in his periodical... He presents an interesting case for the... periodical to be considered as performance art," said scholars Marie Boivent and Stephen Perkins, citing "his expansion of the traditionally static nature of the periodical into a new role as an active physical agent."

Bloch is recognized as being one of a handful of early converts from mail art to online communities. In 1989, Bloch began his experimental foray into the digital space when he founded Panscan, part of the Echo NYC text-based teleconferencing system, the first online art discussion group in New York City. Panscan lasted from 1990 to 1995.

Following the death of Ray Johnson in 1995, Bloch left Echo and began a twenty-year research project on Communication art and Johnson and wrote several texts on him that were among the earliest to appear online and were cited elsewhere in other media. Bloch and writer/editor Elizabeth Zuba brought together "their distinct visual and literary perspectives to explore Ray Johnson’s innovative interpretations of 'the book'" at the Printed Matter New York Book Fair in 2014. Bloch has since acted as a resource for new generations of Johnson and Fluxus followers on fact-finding missions.

It was Ray Johnson who introduced Bloch to Robert Delford Brown and his wife Rhett Cone Brown by bringing him in the 1980s to their home "that Mr. Brown called 'The Great Building Crack-Up'" in Greenwich Village which eventually led to Bloch becoming Brown's biographer, writing Robert Delford Brown: Meat, Maps, and Militant Metaphysics," published by the Cameron Art Museum in 2007.

In 1984, Johnson stated in a radio interview, "Ray Johnson is playing the role of Ray Johnson. But there was another possibility, which is that the role of Ray Johnson might have been played by Mark Bloch... Mark Bloch, whose introduction to me consists of some letters in which he wrote to me to tell me that he had been impersonating me on the West Coast, which I found rather intriguing. And I wrote back immediately to tell him that if he was impersonating me, that I would impersonate him, and so we began this correspondence; we finally did meet."

Bloch corresponded with Johnson from 1982 until the latter's suicide in 1995. Bloch has written extensively about Johnson and other art for The Brooklyn Rail, Paper Magazine, New Observations, Whitehot Magazine, The New Art Examiner and others.

== Fine artist ==
Mark Bloch works in a variety of media and calls himself a "pan-media" artist.

Bloch's one man show "Secrets of the Ancient 20th Century Gamers" was presented at Emily Harvey Foundation in NYC March 18 through April 2, 2010 and received favorable reviews. It featured paintings, collage works, assemblage, issues of his zine "Panmag" and other works.

In 2014, Bloch curated a New York City arts festival celebrating the centenary of cult hero artist-collector Guglielmo Achille Cavellini, at various venues around Manhattan including the Museum of Modern Art Library, Richard L. Feigen & Co., Lynch Tham, and the Whitebox Art Center on the Lower East Side where a 55 foot long wall covered with artworks from the mail art network and local artists and a 14 by 14 foot drawing of Cavellini by Bloch was revealed during a three hour-plus opening marathon of performances, spoken word and music.

In 2016, Bloch and the granddaughter of Dada founder Marcel Janco, the Israeli art journaler and art therapist, Michaela Mende Janco, created "Dadawatch," a one-year communications project to celebrate the 100th anniversary of Dada, and invited public online participation.

On February 22, 2019, Emily Harvey Foundation presented the world premiere of "Not Jean Brown" by Bloch and the artists Rimma & Valeriy Gerlovin, a 16-minute short film about the Massachusetts art collector, Jean Brown (1916–1994), some 35 years after it was originally begun in 1985. The video covers highlights of Brown's vast archives, now at the Getty Research Institute in Los Angeles. Bloch edited the film and created the soundtrack that featured "Sink Sound (for Jean Brown)," a "music of contingency" contributed by composer John Cage.

Bloch exhibited several issues of his Panmag zine and some artistbook works at Paris Koh Gallery in Fort Lee, NJ, in 2024. Critic Robert C. Morgan called it "fascinating work that rethinks how communication is done in the digital era" and cited the ability of Bloch's "The Museum of Good Ideas III (2014)" to "transcend its material constraints."

Bloch curated an exhibition called “Panmodern!” at the Bobst Library of New York University, featuring papers and archives of his Postal Art Network (P.A.N.) activities that utilized the international postal system as a distribution system. The exhibition ran from September 17, 2024, to January 28, 2025, at Fales Library's "Downtown Collection," founded in 1994, which documents the downtown Manhattan arts scene that evolved in SoHo and the Lower East Side during the 1970s and through the early 1990s. The “Panmodern!” exhibition was previously scheduled to run from March 26 to June 30, 2020, but it was postponed by NYU due to the COVID-19 virus. An interview with Bloch ran in the Brooklyn Rail's March 2020 issue as a cover story on the show that hit newsstands the same week that the Pandemic postponed "Panmodern!." When the show finally opened four years later, the Brooklyn Rail covered it again as did several other New York City publications.

In July 2026, Bloch participated in a New York City "GonzoFest," celebrating the legacy of Hunter S. Thompson where he showed his diagram-painting, “Self Portrait of the Triumphant, Hopeful Taoist-Quaker Trickle Down Gonzo A.I. Cultural Worker” chronicling his introduction to Beat and Gonzo styles in the late 70s via Cleveland journalist Michael Heaton. Bloch also read an excerpt from his epistolary correspondence novel with Heaton, "Dead Letters: The Last of Mail Chauvinists."
