= Robert Kirby (cartoonist) =

American cartoonist (born 1962)

- Born: September 1962 (age 64) Detroit, Michigan
- Area: Cartoonist
- Notable works: Curbside Boys; Boy Trouble; Marry Me a Little
- Spouse: John C.

Robert Kirby (/ˈkɜːrbi/; born 1962) is an American cartoonist, known for his long-running syndicated comic Curbside – which ran in the gay and alternative presses from 1991 to 2008 – and other works focusing on queer characters and community, including Strange Looking Exile, Boy Trouble, THREE, and QU33R. He has worked alongside critically acclaimed queer artists including Diane DiMassa and Alison Bechdel.

== Early life ==
Robert Kirby was born in Detroit, Michigan in September 1962. He attended the University of Minnesota. He lived in Manhattan, New York City, New York for a while, during which he worked on Curbside Boys: The New York Years.

== Career ==
Kirby began publishing comics with Strange Looking Exile, a zine published in the early 1990s, and grew popular through his long-running comic Curbside Boys. Kirby had his first venture into producing comics with the comic zine Strange Looking Exile, which also featured work by Diane DiMassa, Roberta Gregory, Joan Hilty, Nick Leonard, Leanne Franson, Michelle Rau, Terry Sapp, and Alison Bechdel. The zine ran from 1991 until 1994.

Following that, Kirby began producing a new comic zine called Boy Trouble with co-editor David Kelly, a comics anthology that was published four issues as a zine, followed by a book in 2004. Boy Trouble features contributions and collaborations from the editors as well as a number of other artists and writers including Anonymous Boy, C. Bard Cole, Michael Fahy, Andy Hartzell, Steve Matuszak, Sina Shamsavari, and others.

In 2002, State Representative Nancy Sheltra (R-Derby) protested the presence of the publication Out In The Mountains in the Vermont Statehouse due to its inclusion of Kirby's strip featuring two bare-chested male cartoon characters kissing, which she deemed "pornographic".

In 2006, an anthology of the best of Boy Trouble was released, entitled The Book of Boy Trouble, which also included new work and work in color. Besides the editors, Kirby and Kelly, the book featured sequential art by Anonymous Boy, Craig Bostick, C. Bard Cole, Jaime Cortez, Michael Fahy, Justin Hall, Andy Hartzell, Victor Hodge, Brett Hopkins, Nick Leonard, Steve MacIsaac, Josue Menjivar, Sina Shamsavari, D. Travers Scott, and Russ Turk. This work had comics that focused on topics including love, sex, and punk rock, among other things.

In 2008, The Book of Boy Trouble Volume 2: Born to Trouble was published, featured work by many of the artists from the first volume as well as work by Jennifer Camper, Derek Charm, Howard Cruse, Abby Denson, Tim Fish, Joan Hilty, G.B. Jones, Nick Leonard, Ed Luce, Jon Macy, Steve MacIsaac, Dave Ortega, Bill Roundy, and Robert Triptow.

Kirby was also a regular contributor to the ongoing queer comics anthology Juicy Mother, edited by Jennifer Camper, and released in 2005 and 2007. In 2010 Robert Kirby began his ongoing LGBT comics anthology, THREE, and in 2014 his 33-person anthology QU33R was published by Northwest Press.

He also reviews comics for The Comics Journal, among them the anthology Drawing Power, edited by Diane Noomin. He has also been published in Panel Patter, Rain Taxi, and other publications for his reviews and comics.

== Personal life ==
Kirby was married in October 2013, after same-sex marriage was legalized in Minnesota in May of that same year. He and his spouse John live in St. Paul, Minnesota.

== Works ==
=== Curbside ===
Curbside is the story of two young men: Drew, an aspiring writer, and Nathan, an aspiring musician, who meet and eventually form a tumultuous relationship. The comic was syndicated in several periodicals, including Chicago Nightlines, Out In The Mountains, Lavender Magazine and others, as well as on the internet. The series has also been collected into two books. The first book published with the aid of a Xeric Foundation grant. A translation into Spanish has also been published.

=== Boy Trouble ===
Boy Trouble is a zine by Robert Kirby and David Kelly that was made in order to highlight alternative queer comics from a newer generation of male artists. Four issues were published since 1994. A fifth issue was published in 2004. The Book of Boy Trouble, an anthology of these zines, was published in 2006, followed by The Book of Boy Trouble 2: Born to Trouble in 2008.

=== Marry Me a Little ===
Robert Kirby completed a graphic memoir called Marry Me a Little, which explores marriage as a middle-aged gay man. It also discusses the legalization of gay marriage in Minnesota (where Kirby and his husband live) in May 2013. An excerpt of Marry Me a Little was originally published on PEN America in June 2018. The excerpt also appears on his personal website. The book was published in Feb 2023 by Graphic Mundi, the graphic imprint of Penn State University Press.

== Awards and recognition ==
In 1997, Kirby was awarded a Xeric Grant, given by the Xeric Foundation to comics artists for self-publishing their work. Kirby used this grant in publishing his first book, Curbside.

His anthology THREE was nominated for two Ignatz awards and received a Prism Comics Queer Press Grant in 2011.

In 2014, his anthology QU33R was published and won the Ignatz Award for Outstanding Anthology or Collection.

== Publications ==
=== Anthologies ===
- Boy Trouble, edited by Robert Kirby and David Kelly, Boy Trouble Books, 2004, ISBN 0-9748855-0-9
- The Book Of Boy Trouble, edited by Robert Kirby and David Kelly, Green Candy Press, 2006 ISBN 1-931160-45-7
- The Book of Boy Trouble 2: Born to Trouble, edited by Robert Kirby and David Kelly, Green Candy Press, 2008 ISBN 978-1-931160-65-0
- THREE, edited by Robert Kirby. three issues published from 2010 to 2012.
- QU33R, edited by Robert Kirby, 2014, from Northwest Press, ISBN 978-1-938720-36-9
- What's Your Sign, Girl? Cartoonists Talk About Their Sun Signs, edited by Robert Kirby, 2015 from Ninth Art Press
- The Shirley Jackson Project: Comics Inspired by Her Life and Work, edited by Robert Kirby, 2016, from Ninth Art Press

=== Books ===
- Curbside, Hobnob Press, NY, 1989, ISBN 0-9663241-0-2
- Curbside Boys: The New York Years, Cleis Press, 2002, ISBN 1-57344-154-6
- Los Chicos De la Acera De Enfrente, Ediciones La Cúpula, Colección Novela Gráfica, 2005
- Marry Me a Little, Graphic Mundi, 2023, ISBN 978-1-63779-039-7

=== Contributions ===
- Gay Comix #17, Bob Ross, 1993
- Gay Comix #20, Bob Ross, 1993
- The Question of Equality: Lesbian and Gay Politics in America Since Stonewall, Scribner, 1995
- The Factsheet Five Zine Reader: The Best Writing from the Underground World of Zines, Three Rivers Press, 1997
- Gay Comix #25, Bob Ross, 1998
- Spice Capades, Fantagraphics, 1999
- What's Wrong? Explicit Graphic Interpretations Against Censorship, Arsenal Pulp, 2001
- Juicy Mother: Celebration, edited by Jennifer Camper, Soft Skull Press, 2005, ISBN 1-932360-70-0
- Juicy Mother 2: How They Met, edited by Jennifer Camper, Manic D Press, 2007 ISBN 978-1-933149-20-2
- Young Bottoms In Love, edited by Tim Fish, Poison Press, 2007 ISBN 978-0-9762786-7-2
- Glamazonia, Northwest Press, 2010
- No Straight Lines: Four Decades of Queer Comics, edited by Justin Hall, Fantagraphics, 2012 ISBN 978-1-60699-506-8
- Subcultures, Ninth Art Press, 2015
- Not My Small Diary #18: The Pet Issue, Delaine Derry Green, 2015
- Egoscopic #'s 9-14, Studio FGH, 2016-2018
- Alphabet, edited by Tara Madison Avery & Jon Macy, Stacked Deck Press, 2016 ISBN 978-0-9970487-1-1
- Not My Small Diary #19: True Unexplained Events, Delaine Derry Green, 2017
- The Shirley Jackson Project: Comics Inspired by Her Life and Work, edited by Robert Kirby, 2016, from Ninth Art Press, ISBN 978-0-9903433-6-3
- Rainbow Reflections: Body Image Comics for Queer Men, edited by Stephanie Gauvin, Phillip Joy & Matthew Lee, 2019, Ad Astra, ISBN 978-0-9940507-9-3
- Covid Chronicles: A Comics Anthology, edited by Kendra Boileau and Rich Johnson, 2021, Graphic Mundi, ASIN B08VYMGNKQ
