= Fahrenheit 451 Books =

Former bookstore in Laguna Beach, California

Coordinates: 33.5407°N 117.7825°W

Fahrenheit 451 Books was a bookstore, formerly located on 509 South Coast Highway in Laguna Beach, California. It was described by the Los Angeles Times as a "literary landmark" of the region. It closed in 1994.

== Early years ==
The bookstore, which also included an art gallery, was established in 1968 by Dennis Madison and Lyn Chevli, owned in her name because she had a state reseller's license. After their divorce, it was sold in 1972 to Gordon & Evie Wilson. The bookstore had legal battles with the City of Laguna Beach, charged with selling obscene literature including early underground comics by R. Crumb, Joyce Farmer, and Chevli. Philip Hackett ran the Poets' Corner reading house there during the early 70's with support from Marta Mitrovich.

== New owners ==
The bookstore's fortunes changed for the better when, in June 1976, Fahrenheit was bought by Lorraine and Norman Zimmerman, and their friend, Mike Kopp (the Zimmermans became sole owners from the fall of 1978). After extensive renovation, the new owners opened the bookstore to the public in October 1976. With about 10,000 titles confined to a 650 sq. ft. space, the grand opening ceremony took place on Nov. 14, 1976, with famed activist Jerry Rubin signing copies of his new book, Growing Up at Thirty-Seven (New York : M. Evans, 1976). On Dec. 14, 1982, Fahrenheit 451 Books opened a Used Book Annex. Present at the annex's grand opening was none other than Ray Bradbury and his favorite illustrator, Joseph Mugnaini. Run by Carmen Blue, the Annex drew bibliophiles from the entire Orange Country region until it closed in 1987.

== National recognition ==
Within five years of its grand opening, Fahrenheit 451 Books received national recognition. In a 1981 article in The New York Times on the effect of the economic slowdown on book sales throughout the country, Lorraine Zimmerman was one of five booksellers interviewed. By the time Zimmerman sold the bookstore on Dec. 18, 1988, to Dorothy Ibsen (the bookstore closed its doors shortly after), Fahrenheit 451 Books had become a celebrated cultural institution throughout the whole of Southern California and beyond. In January 1987, the Los Angeles Times described Fahrenheit as “one of the most distinctive independent bookstore in Southern California next to George Sand Books in West Hollywood.” When the store closed under Zimmerman's ownership, the same newspaper referred to Fahrenheit as "a socially liberal literary oasis in a county famous for its ultraconservative bent."

Zimmerman's bookstore also received praise in a popular book on California. "Bookstores are as rare as radicals in Orange County," Ray Riegert wrote in his Hidden Coast of California. "One notable exception is Fahrenheit 451. ... You won't miss it, that's for sure," he continued, "... [for] within its limited space is a connoisseur's collection of newspapers, magazines, hardcovers, and page turners." Fahrenheit 451 Books also found its way into T. Jefferson Parker's celebrated novel, Little Saigon.

== Hosting authors ==
In the period 1976 to 1988, Fahrenheit hosted book signings for some 20 internationally renowned authors. These included Lawrence Ferlinghetti, Literary San Francisco: a Pictorial History from its Beginnings to the Present Day (Aug. 1980); Galway Kinnell, There are Things I Tell to No One (Jan. 1981); Carolyn Forché, Gathering the Tribes (Sept. 1982); Ray Bradbury and Joseph Mugnaini, Fahrenheit 451: Illustrated by Joseph Mugnaini (Dec. 1982); Oakley Hall, Children of the Sun (June 1983); Gary Snyder, Axe Handles: Poems (Sept. 1983); Denise Levertov, Light Up the Cave (April 1984); Allen Ginsberg, Collected poems, 1947-1980 (Aug. 1985); T. Jefferson Parker, Laguna Heat (Oct. 1985) and Little Saigon (Sept. 1988); June Jordan, Civil Wars: Observations from the Front Lines of America (Sept. 1986); P. D. James (Jan. 1987), Robert Ray, Dial "M" for Murdock (March 1987), Michael Chabon, The mysteries of Pittsburgh (May 1988), Alice McDermott, That Night (Nov. 1987), Charles Wright (1986), Robert Scheer (1988), and Richard Ford. In addition to books, music was an important part of the bookstore's offerings. Such albums as "Pianoscapes" by Michael Jones, "Autumn" & "December" by George Winston, "Passages" by William Ackerman, and Kitarō's "Theme from Silk Road" were sold and often playing in the background. New-age music was a part of the 1980s music scene and became part of the beachfront bookstore's atmosphere.

At the request of Zimmerman, on Nov. 16, 1980, "from 11 a.m. to 7 p.m.," local performance artist Mark Bloch spent the day in the window of the bookstore working on his postal art magazine Panmag (ISSN 0738-4777) and performing a work called "Artist for Sale", in which he made himself available to "buy or rent" for $10,000 an hour. Bloch produced an issue of the early D.I.Y. zine numbered "451" in honor of the famed bookstore and invited visitors to create work which he later mailed. Bloch also typed on a typewriter in the window and gave a lecture on his "Postal Art Network" and its relationship to Laguna's status as an "art colony."

== Evaluation ==
Novelist P. D. James entered into the bookstore's scrapbook that she considered Fahrenheit to be "my idea of a perfect bookstore." The success of Fahrenheit 451 Books was largely due to the competency and commitment of its owner, who stated less than a month before passing the keys to a new owner that "to say I own a bookstore, it's a title of respect and integrity and honesty." In an article for American Bookseller, Zimmerman discussed her core philosophy of bookselling. "Discussing books," she wrote, "with customers and local writers; sponsoring literary events; having a finger on the pulse of current American thought through the knowledge of forthcoming books and my customers' requests; having the ability to disseminate hard-to-find information--these were the daily rewards of bookselling."

After moving to northern California, Lorraine Zimmerman opened Collected Thoughts Bookshop in Berkeley in 1996. Eight years later, in 2004, she sold the bookstore after which she became partner at University Press Books (UPB) in Berkeley. Then a grandmother to five boys, Zimmerman created and managed UPB's first ever children's book section. She retained her position at UPB until her death on July 12, 2017.
