= Celeste West =

American librarian and author (1942–2008)

- Born: November 24, 1942; Pocatello, Idaho, U.S.
- Died: January 3, 2008 (aged 65)
- Education: Portland State University (BA); Rutgers University

Celeste (Celestia) West (November 24, 1942 – January 3, 2008) was an American librarian and lesbian author, known for her alternative viewpoints in librarianship and her authorship of books about lesbian sex and polyfidelity. She herself was polyamorous.

== Biography ==
West was born in Pocatello, Idaho. She earned her BA in journalism from Portland State University, and her Master's in Library Service from Rutgers University in 1968. She then moved to San Francisco, where she worked at the headquarters of the Bay Area Reference Center at the San Francisco Public Library. She was the second editor of its magazine, Synergy, which won two ALA awards but lost its funding in 1973 after West published an unflattering photograph of Richard Nixon.

In 1972, West co-founded Booklegger Press, the first woman-owned American library publisher, with Sue Critchfield (her partner at the time) and Valerie Wheat. The press' first publication was an anthology edited by West and Elizabeth Katz entitled Revolting Librarians. The anthology, which described biases in contemporary library practices and proposed alternative library models, sold 15,000 copies in three years. She also published the feminist library journal Booklegger Magazine from 1973 through 1976. Between 1989 and 2006, West worked as the library director at the San Francisco Zen Center.

== Selected works ==
- Revolting Librarians (editor, 1972)
- Women's Films in Print (1975)
- Positive Images: Non-Sexist Films for Young People (1976)
- The Passionate Perils of Publishing (1978)
- The Public Library Mission Statement and Its Imperatives for Service (1979)
- Where Have All the Publishers Gone? (1980)
- Book of Lesbian Etiquette (1985)
- Words in Our Pockets (1985)
- Elsa: I Come With My Songs (editor, 1986)
- A Lesbian Love Advisor (illustrated by Nicole Ferentz, 1989)
- Lesbian Polyfidelity (illustrated by Nicole Ferentz, 1996)
