= Nib-Lit =

Nib-Lit is a weekly comics journal edited by Mykl Sivak and published both independently in an electronic format as well as running as a two-page section in Southern News, the student newspaper of Southern Connecticut State University. The journal features original and syndicated strips by a wide range of international cartoonists, both established and up-and-coming. It features a number of comics formats from single panel comic strips, to multi-page graphic short stories, to serialized graphic novels. The journal also prints comics related columns and criticism by writers from within and outside of the comics world. Nib-Lit also regularly releases a podcast featuring interviews with creators from across the comics world.

Nib-Lit sponsors and organizes the New Haven Summer Comics Fest. The Fest is a one-day event featuring artist and publisher tables; panel discussions; short films and animations directed by and/or featuring work of comics creators; comics slide shows; and a keg of free beer. The event exists in conjunction with the New Haven Street Fest, a yearly event coordinated by the not-for-profit group Ideat Village.

== Formats ==
Nib-Lit is released weekly as a full-color digital download. During the fall and spring semesters, it is printed as a two-page spread in the Southern News. Each page measures 22.75 x 12.75 inches. While most newspaper comics sections reduce the size of strips and panels, Nib-Lit publishes comics 11.25 inches wide, a single comic spanning the entire width of the paper.

As well as weekly issues, Nib-Lit frequently releases special download only editions including Complete Volume anthologies and Artist vs. Artist expanded-page editions.

== Contributors ==
Notable contributors include:

- Tony Millionaire, creator of the comic strip Maakies and the comic book Sock Monkey.
- Shannon Wheeler, creator of the comic strip Too Much Coffee Man.
- Howard Cruse, creator of Wendel and Gay Comix.
- Nick Abadzis, creator of the graphic novel Laika.
- Sean Pryor, illustrator for Smith Magazine's Harvey Pekar Project.
- Sam Henderson, cartoonist, writer and expert on American comedy history.
- Steve Skeates, writer for DC Comics and Marvel Comics.
- Kristyna Baczynski, cartoonist and animator for BBC, Maker's Mark Whiskey, and more.
- Josh Bayer & Jouquin de la Puente, creators of Bam-Bam and the Barbarians.
- Marc Palm, a.k.a. Swellzombie, VHS historian and creator of Swellzomies lair of the Psychic Creature.
- Box Brown, creator of Bellen!.
- Nicolas Chalupa Chanic, editor of Lazer Art Zine, Belgian arts journal.
- Jarod Roselló
- Craig Collins, Iain Laurie, Dave Alexander
- Mike Wood, author of Alchemy.

== Podcast ==
Podcast interviews include:

- Shannon Wheeler
- Howard Cruse
- Mike Dawson
- Liz Baille
- Bill Plympton
- Gabrielle Bell
- Abby Denson
- Matt Loux
