= Kerista =

Utopian community

Kerista was a utopian community that was started in New York City in 1956 by John Peltz "Bro Jud" Presmont. Throughout much of its history, Kerista was centered on the ideals of polyfidelity, as well as the creation of intentional communities. Kerista underwent several incarnations that later became known as the "Old Tribe", which was associated with a fairly large but fluid membership.

== Founding ==
Kerista was founded by John Presmont after an auditory hallucination telling him that he was the founder of the next great religion of the world. After time spent in New York in the 1950s, and several island experiments in Dominica, Honduras, and Belize in the 1960s, Jud settled in San Francisco at the end of the 1960s.

== Old Tribe ==
Kerista-inspired storefronts and communal houses existed in New York, Los Angeles, and the San Francisco Bay Area throughout the 1960s, and were moderately popular. The ideology shared by the Old Tribe was remarkably simple: 'Wash your own dish', 'No one belongs to anyone else', 'Kerista is freedom and love'. The main tenets of the Old Tribe embody the hippie ideals of 'good vibes' and the 'righteous high', racial and sexual liberation, and a strong tendency toward dropping out of the default/mainstream world and living a non-conformist life of idealism, spontaneity, and fun. In addition, Old Tribers began the use of a Ouija board for wisdom and guidance, and use of the "alphabet-board" continued in the New Tribe.

One division occurred in the Old Tribe over the Vietnam War. Jud was a patriotic WWII veteran, and he supported US military intervention. However, the vast majority of the Old Tribe were anti-war. Jud's pro-military beliefs were unpopular in leftist circles and regularly surprised visitors who expected Jud to be left-of-center.

== New Tribe ==
From 1971 until 1991, the community was centered at the Kerista Commune (not a single physical building), founded in the Haight-Ashbury district of San Francisco, California. The Keristans maintained a very high profile that included publication of a popular free newspaper and several national media appearances.

When it was active, Kerista was a focal point for those interested in alternative and non-monogamous lifestyles. The terms polyfidelity and compersion were coined at the Kerista Commune. The commune developed an entire vocabulary around alternative lifestyles; for example, the term "polyintimacy" in their literature was similar to the term "polyamory" popularized years later. Entrance to the commune was extremely selective. Potential members were expected to attend the Growth Coop for several months, interact with other Keristans at potluck volleyball and during newspaper distribution, and socialize with various BFIC (Best-Friend Identity Clusters) families. This intense mutual-selection process included months of transitional celibacy. Starting in Fall 1986, it included screening for AIDS/HIV before joining a sleeping schedule. By 1987 there was no celibacy period, but three months of transitional safer sex and quarterly HIV testing for the duration. A more controversial policy was men being required to undergo a vasectomy in order to join. That policy was overturned a year before the New Tribe ended.

=== Social contract standards ===
Kerista accumulated a codified social contract over its history with which all members were expected to agree and comply, at all times. Starting with a few unwritten rules in 1971 to 26 standards in 1979, the social contract evolved to 84 standards by 1983. There were over 100 standards in 1991, examples of which included:

- Total rationality at all times
- Search for truth through the elimination of contradictions
- No jealousy, no anger, no rivalry, no sexism, no ageism, no racism, no classism, no duplicity, no alienation, no profanity, no flippancy
- Social tolerance, equality, verbality, participatory democracy, accountability, conviviality, graceful distancing
- Positive attitude toward the 'toggle-switch' mode of decision-making
- There is one and only one objective reality

=== Gestalt-O-Rama / Utopian Psychology ===
Kerista used a group process called Gestalt-O-Rama, loosely taken from Fritz Perls' concept of gestalt ("enhanced awareness of sensation, perception, bodily feelings, emotion, and behavior, in the present moment.") For Keristans, gestalt consisted of a lot of conversation in groups. Maintaining personal 'resolve-on-the-lifestyle', a euphemism for being aligned with the social contract, was a daily task for many Keristans. Being 'unresolved-on-the-lifestyle', even momentarily or temporarily, warranted immediate gestalt and possible expulsion from the family or commune. Practically, a member could be "called out" on any standards violation or non-utopian thought or action by anyone at any time.

=== Publications ===
Kerista produced zines that included drawings and comics. Some concerned day-to-day life. Others presented a lighthearted polytheistic mythology that revolved around a pantheon of benevolent and technologically adept goddesses and gods. The comic Far Out West, written by one of the founders Eve "Even Eve" Furchgott, claimed to be "The First Utopian Comic Strip." Features presented in the zine included articles and essays concerning life within the community and their proposed World Plan to establish a functional Utopian society on a larger scale. The volume of publications and artwork produced by Kerista Commune was quite a bit greater than other groups that were active in Haight-Ashbury during this period. Kerista claimed singer Joan Jett as the "Matron Saint" of their community.

=== Work Life / Abacus ===
The Keristans shared income and could choose whether to have outside paying jobs or work within the community (which operated several businesses, a legally incorporated church, and an educational non-profit organization).

The most successful of the businesses was Abacus, Inc., an early Macintosh computer vendor in San Francisco, which eventually offered a variety of computer hardware, training, and services. At its height, Abacus had over 250 employees, offices in five cities, and revenues in excess of $25 million a year. It was voted the 33rd and 42nd fastest-growing privately held company in America by Inc. Magazine in 1990 and 1991 respectively, and was the top reseller of Macintosh computers in the Bay Area in 1991.

=== Membership ===
A website run by a long-term former member, the Kerista Commune website, lists 44 people as having joined Kerista at various times during the community's history, though at least 75 passed through briefly. The commune population numbered 5 at founding in 1971, and 26 at dissolution in 1991. Before dissolution, there were closer to 30 Keristans in residence.

The commune maintained a very active program of social events and Gestalt-o-rama rap groups, which were open to the public 3-4 nights a week, and were mandatory for Keristans to regularly attend. The commune functioned much like a religious order and was an important focal point for a larger community of people in San Francisco interested in alternative lifestyles. The events sponsored by Kerista were almost always free and non-commercial.

In 1979 and 1980, two children were born in the community. Beginning in 1983, the adult male Keristans underwent vasectomies to deal with birth control and address global population issues. All male members were subsequently required to have a vasectomy within a set period of time after joining the community.

=== Family life / polyfidelity / sleeping schedule ===
The family structure of Kerista was composed of fidelitous groups called B-FICs (Best-Friend Identity Clusters). Keristans practiced non-preferential polyfidelity, which required consensus to accept a new person into the group.

Non-preferentiality was an important concept of Keristan polyfidelity, and had lofty goals but was more intended to keep people from coupling up. Keristans had a transitional celibacy period after joining a group of three months, which was sometimes waived.

A single B-FIC was composed of men and women who rotated sleeping with all of the opposite-sex members on a balanced rotational sleeping schedule. The sleeping schedule assigned each family member to sleep with a different opposite-sex partner each night. Since the BFICs were rarely balanced between men and women (typically more women than men), on any given night several family-members would have no partner to sleep with and were assigned a 'Zero-Night' when they slept alone. In addition to the programmed sleeping schedule, it was permitted to sleep with any opposite-sex family member at any time, which was termed a 'freebie'.

=== Jud as leader ===
Jud exerted clear leadership and unparalleled influence over the daily life and direction of the commune and its members. He was highly verbal and charismatic, and had boundless confidence in his own opinion. As the oldest Keristan with many marriages and communal experiments behind him, he often dominated commune discussions. Jud typically got into fights with famous people who came to visit or study Kerista, like Stephen Gaskin from The Farm, Mario Savio from the Berkeley Free Speech Movement, and the researcher Robert Weiss.

=== Criticism ===
After an arranged visit to Kerista by three professors, the New Tribe was criticized for not being egalitarian, notably for Bro Jud's dominance of many commune matters. The same professors questioned whether Kerista was feminist, and whether Kerista made only token contributions to philanthropy. A separate dissertation, written by an ex-Keristan, argued that Jud was not the primary problem, and instead criticized Kerista for institutionalizing '...a fetish for purity', describing 'the core psychological process in Kerista [to be] anxiety-producing and ultimately destructive because it centered around the toxic value of purity, which made the commune a bad place to live.'

== Dissolution ==
In November 1991, Bro Jud left the Purple Submarine and the Kerista Commune after sharp divisions were exposed within the membership. Conflicts between Abacus and Kerista had grown more acute, as Abacus became more successful and difficult to manage. Other issues discussed during dissolution include allowing less-religious people into the commune and the loosening of superfluous rules.

After many incidents with members beginning to confront Jud's behavior, Jud left Purple and Kerista. Within a few months, the community was dissolved by vote. Bro Jud went on to create The World Academy of Keristan Education. Several former members of the commune still live in the San Francisco Bay Area, while a number moved to Hawaii and purchased a block of adjoining parcels of land.

John (Bro Jud) Presmont died on December 13, 2009, in San Francisco. In his last years, Jud had been seen regularly on 'The Bro Jud Show' on San Francisco public-access television cable TV. The show featured Jud set behind a desk in a chroma-keyed background featuring pre-recorded psychedelic visuals. After Jud's opening invitations to global thought leaders to collaborate in his utopian vision. Associate member Jennifer Glee would make a reading, which was then interspersed by songs from the 'Bargain Basement Band', a mix of followers and local San Francisco musicians. Glee briefly took over the show after Jud suffered a hip injury in 2007 and has since started her own Youtube channel.

== Kerista, Robert A. Heinlein, and Stranger in a Strange Land ==
Science-fiction author Robert A. Heinlein, in a 1966 letter to his agent Lurton Blassingame, mentioned Kerista in connection with his 1961 novel Stranger in a Strange Land:

I recently learned that it was considered the "New Testament"—and compulsory reading—of a far-out cult called "Kerista." (Kee-rist!). I don't know exactly what "Kerista" is, but its L.A. chapter offered me $100 to speak. (I turned them down.)

The person who invited Heinlein to speak may have been Kerry Thornley, co-founder of Discordianism, who at the time lived in Watts. Thornley had joined Kerista in 1966 and was a lifelong science-fiction fan.

Kerista's polyamorous sexual practice was influenced, as was that of the Church of All Worlds, by Robert A. Heinlein's (1907-88) science-fiction novel Stranger in a Strange Land (1961), in which the Martian-raised human Michael Valentine Smith founded The Church of All Worlds, preached sexual freedom and the truth of all religions, and is martyred by narrow-minded people who are not ready for freedom.
