= Naughty Bits =

Comic book series by Roberta Gregory

- Naughty Bits #13 (July 1994)

Publication information
- Publisher: Fantagraphics Books
- Format: Standard, black-and-white
- Publication date: March 1991 - July 2004
- No. of issues: 40
- Main character(s): Midge McCracken a.k.a. Bitchy Bitch; Bitchy Butch

Creative team
- Created by: Roberta Gregory
- Written by: Roberta Gregory
- Artist: Roberta Gregory

Collected editions
- Life's a Bitch: Complete Bitchy Bitch Stories: ISBN 978-1560976561

Naughty Bits was a comic book series written and illustrated by Roberta Gregory, and published by Fantagraphics Books. The series ran from March 1991 to July 2004, totalling 40 issues.

Naughty Bits is the story of Midge McCracken, aka Bitchy Bitch, an everyday woman angry at the world who frequently explodes with rage. The character made her first appearance in the Fantagraphics anthology Graphic Story Monthly #6 (June 1990). The comic has also appeared in animated form as Bitchy Bits and Life's a Bitch.

The stories in Naughty Bits are set in the present day. Bitchy Bitch has a lesbian counterpart named Bitchy Butch.

== Collections ==
- A Bitch is Born: Adventures of Midge the Bitchy Bitch (Fantagraphics, 1994) ISBN 978-1560971566
- Naughty Bits vol. 2: As Naughty as She Wants to Be (Fantagraphics 1996) ISBN 978-1560971825 — collecting material considered too controversial for the first Naughty Bits collection
- At Work and Play with Bitchy Bitch (Fantagraphics, 1996) ISBN 978-1560973065 — material from Naughty Bits #10-14
- Bitchy's College Daze: Adventures of Midge the Bitchy Bitch (Fantagraphics, 1998) ISBN 978-1560972778— stories from Naughty Bits #15-19
- Bitchy Butch: World's Angriest Dyke (Fantagraphics, 1999) ISBN 978-1560973492 — stories from Naughty Bits #21, 23, 26, and stories from Gay Comix
- Bitchy Strips (self-published, 2001) — one-shot collection of weekly strips previously published in alternative weeklies such as the Seattle Weekly and Willamette Week
- Burn Bitchy Burn (Fantagraphics, 2002) ISBN 978-1560974925
- Life's a Bitch: Complete Bitchy Bitch Stories (Fantagraphics, 2005) ISBN 978-1560976561 — first half of Bitchy Bitch stories plus one new story

== Reception ==
Paul Constant of The Stranger called Naughty Bits "one of the best comic series I've ever read. ... It's basically a biography of one normal—albeit kinda hateful—woman, and it's insightful, funny, and true."

Naughy Bits was nominated for Best New Series in the 1992 Harvey Awards, and was nominated for Best Humor Publication in the 1992 Eisner Awards. "Hippie Bitch Gets Laid," in Naughty Bits #6, was nominated for Best Short Story in the 1993 Eisners. That same year, Gregory was nominated for the Best Writer and Best Writer/Artist Eisner Awards. Naughty Bits #6-8, the "Abortion Trilogy", was nominated for a 1994 Eisner for Best Serialized Story, and Gregory was again nominated in the Best Writer/Artist category. "Bye-Bye, Muffy," in Naughty Bits #28, was nominated for Best Short Story in the 2000 Eisner Awards.

== In other media ==
Beginning in 2001, a series of shorts featuring Bitchy Bitch called Bitchy Bits was shown on the Oxygen Network animated series X-Chromosome.

Life's a Bitch, an animated series spun-off from the X-Chromosome shorts, aired from 2003 to 2004 on Oxygen in the U.S. and on The Comedy Network in Canada.

== See also ==
- List of feminist comic books
- Portrayal of women in comics
