= Rhonda Dicksion =

Author and cartoonist

In the early 1990s, a freelance author named Rhonda Dicksion entered the scene as a queer cartoonist. She published multiple lesbian-focused cartoons in a turbulent time for the lesbian community that were considered lighthearted, joyful, and normalizing lesbian as well as interracial relationships. She contributed to multiple LGBTQ+ journals and anthologies. She additionally published her own cartooning books and comics with Naiad press. Later in life, Dicksion went into the Fine Arts sector and pioneered many new techniques in the colored pencil art industry.

== Biography ==
Rhonda Dicksion was born in Los Angeles to "patient and understanding" parents. She started painting and drawing since she had a nursery. She credits her start in cartooning, according to an interview with Tom Flint in Seattle Gay News, to influences such as Mickey Mouse, Mighty Mouse, and Underdog. She now lives in rural Monroe, WA where she had resided with her partner Krysta Gibson and their corgis since 1981.

== Career ==
=== 1990s ===
Before her time as a cartoonist, Rhonda Dicksion worked "drawing" for various newspapers.

Her first published work, The Lesbian Survival Manual hit the shelves on September 1, 1990, published by Naiad Press Publishing. Known as her most famous and debut work, Dicksion intended to reflect the middle-class lesbian “dilemma” in a series of cartoons. She claims that what got her started working The Lesbian Survival Manual came a year prior to publishing. Her inspiration came in 1989 when she saw a cartoon-idea submission contest in The Lesbian Contradiction, a journal for "irreverent feminism". She later submitted six cartoons, four of which were published, one of which was put on the cover of issue number 26. Her comics were later seen in other issues depicting more "survival hints" for lesbians such as issue 27, page 17, issue 28, page 2, and issue 29 pages 3, 7, 9, and 12. Dicksion's work also shows up in issues 30-48 of The Lesbian Contradiction. Her style was described as different from many cartoonists due to her lack of characters. In most of her cartoons, Dicksion said that the caricatures were "not characters" but different for every scenario to retain relatability. She also claims to be less of a story teller and more of a "graphic artist".

Her next contribution was published in 1992, titled The Erotic Naiad. The Erotic Naiad is a collaboration among different Naiad Press lesbian authors to create an anthology of prominent issues in love and sex. Later, on October 1, 1993, Dicksion published Stay Tooned, also with Naiad Press Publishing Inc, a collection of comics portraying lesbian relationships. On the back of the book, Rhonda is referred to as "one of the sharpest funniest observers of the lesbian scene". Later, in 1998, Rhonda contributed to the Gay Comix issues 15-17 and issue 25. She also contributed to Dyke Strippers: Lesbian Cartoonists from A-Z, an anthology for lesbian cartoonists to share their work in a collected work.

In an interview with Tsuga Fine Art, Dicksion describes her working on cartooning as the help she needed to find her identity as a queer person and author as well as develop her work ethic and skills for later in life when she entered the fine arts business, To Dicksion, the queer community is a group "all together and all moving forward". Creating comics was her "own way of helping the group move forward" as well as just "making people laugh".

=== 2010s ===
Dicksion became less active as a cartoonist post-1990s. She was not active in the early 2000s and later began contributing to the Fine Art's community in 2014. At first, she believed there were too many barriers to entry as she didn't have any degrees or schooling in art, but she soon found that breaking into that world merely required talent and innovation. She discovered different techniques such as using drafting film as a canvas, a now very popular and common medium for artists due to the depth in color. Her works were not recognized until the later 2010s when her shows began winning awards and she drifted completely into fine arts. She is now the editor-in-chief of Color Magazine, the oldest magazine focused on colored pencil art. Rhonda continues to encourage young people and especially young queer people to get into art to express themselves and to realize that the barriers to entry are not as scary as they seem.

== Recognition ==
=== Honors and memberships ===
1. Arizona Artist's Guild Member
2. Colored Pencil Society UK Member
3. Colored Pencil Society of America

Rhonda Dicksion has been an active member of the Colored Pencil Society of America since 2018. She additionally joined the UK Colored Pencil Society in 2019.

=== Awards and reception ===
1. Lyra Award for Exceptional Merit
2. Edmond's Art Festival, 1st Place
3. Edmond's Art Festival, 2nd Place

Rhonda Dicksion is the recipient of many awards attributed to her fine arts career. The Lyra Award for Exceptional Merit was given at one of her art shows titled Desert Gods, a colored pencil art show. One of her works titled Still Life With Harvey won second place at the Edmonds Art Festival in 2019 and another titled Wanderlust won first place. Rhonda Dicksion was instated as a member of the Arizona Artists' guild after her Desert Gods show in 2017. Rhonda Dicksion's colored pencil artwork was critiqued by Carolyn Shark in a blogpost issue on artsyshark described as "colorful, unique, vibrant, and bold" as well as inspired by her earlier work in cartooning as lighthearted and joyful.
