= Bay Area Reference Center =

The Bay Area Reference Center (BARC) was a reference service serving nine Northern California public library systems and headquartered at the San Francisco Public Library. It was established as an experiment in 1967 by the California State Library and closed down in 1988, when the funding from the US Federal Government that it relied on was ended. It pioneered the use of networking technologies such as teletype and fax machines in providing reference services to patrons at far-flung, sometimes rural libraries. Its magazine, Synergy, won two ALA awards.

== Background ==
Studies of public library services in California had shown that large parts of the state, particularly rural areas, were underserved. In response, a 1962 master plan called for the establishment of four levels of library services: local libraries, regional reference centers, tertiary reference centers covering larger regions, and as the fourth and final level, the State Library in Sacramento. The Bay Area Reference Center was established in August 1967 as a tertiary center, or "source of last resort", as a collaboration between the San Francisco Public Library and the North Bay Cooperative Library System (NBCLS), a consortium of nine public library systems including 17 libraries in six counties north of San Francisco, with its headquarters in Santa Rosa. It was made possible by a federal grant under the 1964 Library Services and Construction Act; the initial grant was $750,735 for a two-year pilot project. A corresponding service was set up for Southern California, the Southern California Answering Network (SCAN).

== Services ==
Patron questions that could not be answered locally were referred first to one of three secondary reference centers within the system, located at the Vallejo Public Library, the Ukiah-Mendocino County Library, and the Santa Rosa-Sonoma County Public Library. If still unanswerable, they were sent on via a six-day-a-week teletype link to BARC at the San Francisco Main Library. Five NBCLS libraries, the San Francisco Main Library and two San Francisco branches, including the downtown business branch, also had fax machines that were sometimes used for delivering information to patrons. BARC had its own director, assistant director, clerical workers, and eight subject specialists, and acquired specialist reference materials to supplement those already available in the San Francisco library system. The staff also researched some questions in person and by phone and fax, and formed relationships with the libraries at the University of California, Berkeley, NASA, the Library of Congress, the British Museum, and corporations in the region that had specialized libraries. There were frequent interchanges and staff visits between the NBCLS libraries and BARC.

BARC staff conducted biweekly workshops for reference librarians and published bibliographies on topics including the Chinese in California and the San Francisco Public Library's collection on theatrical costumes.

=== Journals ===
Beginning in 1967 BARC published a bibliographic magazine called Synergy. This included controversial topics of the day, such as "the New Left, the New Right, the underground press, feminism, and gay liberation." It twice won the ALA's H. W. Wilson Library Periodical Award, and was so popular its circulation was capped for cost reasons after reaching 2,000, but after its second editor, Celeste West, published an unflattering photograph of Richard Nixon in 1973, its funding was withdrawn by the state librarian, Ethel Crockett. Edward Swanson, president of the Minnesota Library Association, published a protest resolution in the ALA journal, and West's reprimand for unprofessional behavior was withdrawn, but Synergy was replaced by BARC Notes.

== Closure ==
BARC closed down after the federal funding on which it depended was ended in 1988.

== Effectiveness ==
When it closed, BARC served a region populated by 12 million people. In 1978, one analyst saw potential in such pooling of resources to serve a region. In 1984, a comparison of responses to the same genuine patron queries by BARC, the second-level reference center in Fresno, and a for-profit reference service, Information on Demand, showed that BARC's answers were usually better than the Fresno center's as a result of the depth of its resources, but that none of the three answered all the test questions correctly and quickly. The tertiary reference centers were expensive: in 1986 BARC and its Southern Californian counterpart, SCAN, estimated the cost of answering each query at $150, and the California State Library launched a study of costs of the two centers.

== People ==
Richard Coenenberg was the first director of BARC. Assistant Director Gil MacNamee later became director. In addition to West, Peggy Barber, later an ALA staff member, was one of the librarians.
