= Polyfidelity =

Form of polyamory

Polyfidelity is a type of polyamorous relationship in which all members are recognized as equivalent to the other partners and comply to restrict sexual and romantic relationship activities to exclusively only other members within the group.

== Origins ==
The Purple Mobius has been seen added to other images for poly discussion group logos, poly bookclubs, and even cross-over groups like poly atheists. It is not specific to polyfidelity.

The practices and beliefs underlying polyfidelity have long existed, but in uncodified fashion. The broader term "polyamory" first appeared in an article by Morning Glory Zell-Ravenheart, "A Bouquet of Lovers", published in May 1990 in Green Egg magazine, as "poly-amorous". In May 1992, Jennifer L. Wesp created the Usenet newsgroup alt.polyamory, and the Oxford English Dictionary (OED) cites the proposal to create that group as the first verified appearance of the word. The broader words polyamory, polyamorous, and polyamorist were added to the OED in 2006. While polyfidelity is not explicitly listed as a main entry in the OED, it is defined in the Encyclopedia Britannica.

The Oneida Commune of the mid-19th century practiced complex marriage, encouraging individual members in the freedom to have multiple ongoing sexual relationships within the community, as an expression of their beliefs and religious faith. This was occasionally referred to as a group marriage, a term later brought back to popular recognition by the 1974 publication of Group Marriage: a study of contemporary multilateral marriage by Larry Constantine and Joan Constantine. Because modern polyfidelity denotes a closed, exclusive bond among a specific close plural relationship, and because Oneida’s "complex marriages" extended relations and relationships non-exclusively across the entire commune rather than a closed subgroup, it did not fit the modern definition.

Polyfidelity was truly practiced in the "New Tribe" of the Kerista Commune, a utopian community based in the Haight-Ashbury district of San Francisco active from the 1970s to the early 1990s, who engaged in this specific form of polyamory. Members were required to engage in multi-partner relationships that prioritized equality and mutual consent, and respected diverse gender identities and sexual orientations. Sexual activity with all members was encouraged while forming exclusive relationships within the commune was discouraged. Consensus was essential for incorporating new members in and also respecting the group's foundational agreement.

== Function ==
Polyfidelitous relationships are composed of three or more partners who have agreed to be romantically and sexually exclusive within the group. As such, the relationship is ‘’closed’’ as an analogous monogamous relationship would be; the difference compared to monogamy is the amount of people included in the relationship. While being a subtype of general polyamory, polyfidelity can resemble monogamy in its relationship power dynamics, attitudes towards autonomy, and group consent. In this sense, polyfidelity expands upon the standard practices and beliefs of monogamy while still remaining within the category of polyamory.

The group may not be interested in further expansion, or the group may be interested in admitting additional people by unanimous consent of the existing members. Polyfidelity can develop from an established closed-monogamous couple seeking to add one or more individuals to the relationship.

== Benefits and challenges ==
The Parrot Club Mascot was created in 1997 by Ray Dillinger and used by many early poly discussion groups.

=== Advantages ===
A commonly cited advantage of polyfidelity is the ability to have unprotected sex among more than two people while maintaining relative safety regarding STIs, so long as any new members are sufficiently tested before fluid bonding with the group, and keep their commitments. Members know who is in the romantic/sexual network, share expectations about safer sex and disclosure, and can invest in long-term attachment within the defined group. This would have health advantages similar to monogamy, although risks rise somewhat with each person added.

Some note that the closed, collectively negotiated boundaries of polyfidelity can foster a sense of emotional safety and stability because of the relatively closed nature of a poly-faithful environment. Participants in a qualitative study of polyfidelity reported several perceived benefits. Closed multi-partner groups were described as providing opportunities to express “multiple sides” of the self while cultivating a sense of intentional family and shared identity.

=== Neither advantage or disadvantage ===
Polyfidelity inherently affords less flexibility than other forms of nonmonogamy. For example, open relationships and general polyamory do not restrict sexual interactions to specific people. This may be seen as an advantage or disadvantage.

In polyfidelitous groups, interpersonal complexity scales combinatorically as membership increases. Beyond the whole-group bond, each additional member creates new two-person, three-person, and larger sub-group interactions. For example, in a four-person polyfidelitous relationship, there are eleven distinct interaction configurations: the six possible two-person interactions, the four possible three-person interactions, and the interaction that includes all four members together. A three-person relationship has only four such unique interactions. A five-person group has 26. This proliferation of relationship subsystems can increase coordination demands around communication, scheduling, decision-making, and conflict resolution. Humans are suited for traversing these group dynamics, so this is not as drastic as the math would suggest. Dunbar's number, which originates from research relating neocortex size to social network capacity and posits an inner circle of about five especially close support relationships, may have implications for the maximum size at which a relationship could be considered stable and polyfidelitous.

=== Challenges ===
As many polyfidelitous people have transitioned directly from closed monogamy, they can encounter problems in learning to communicate intimately with more than one partner.

People hoping to create or expand a group marriage mention difficulty finding potential partners with enough mutual compatibility to even consider attempting such a relationship. Polyfidelity is an uncommon sub-set of polyamory, which is itself not the norm in the United States.

Polyfidelity, like other forms of consensual non-monogamy, can present the challenge of managing jealousy, maintaining clear communication, and ensuring equitable distribution of emotional and practical responsibilities. Successful polyfidelity often requires strong commitment and communication skills among all members. Many polyfidelitous groups emphasize explicit consent and conflict-resolution to maintain individual autonomy among collective intimacy.

== Other usage ==
In the 2010 television show Caprica, several main characters are portrayed as being in a polyfidelitous-style marriage consisting of multiple men and women, with each member being equal socially and legally. Such marriages co-exist along with monogamous marriages in the show's civilization. When asked about this aspect of the series, co-creator Ronald D. Moore said "In terms of polygamy, it's usually framed in a "Big Love" context – it's one man with many wives. I thought there was something even more intriguing about a true group marriage where all of the partners were married to one another. They have this much bigger definition of what a marriage was and I thought it was a fascinating cultural idea ...".

In the book Lesbian Polyfidelity, author Celeste West uses the term polyfidelity in much the same way that others use polyamory. This may represent independent coinage of the same term within a different community, and this usage is not common among polyamorists in general. West uses the term to emphasize the concept (common in polyamory) that one can be faithful to one's commitments without those commitments including sexual exclusivity.

== See also ==
- Group marriage
- Polyamory
- Open marriage
- Kerista
- Free love
- Non-monogamy
