= Klondike Moon =

1997 video game

- Australia and New Zealand box cover
- Developer: TerraForm Software
- Publishers: 21st Century Entertainment; Manaccom (AUS, NZ)
- Platforms: Windows 95, MS-DOS
- Release: 1997
- Genre: Simulation
- Modes: Single-player, multiplayer

Klondike Moon is a simulation video game for Windows 95 and MS-DOS developed by TerraForm Software and published in 1997 by 21st Century Entertainment. It was distributed as Luna Ticks in Australia and New Zealand by Australian publisher Manaccom.

== Gameplay ==
Klondike Moon is a resource management simulation game set in space, described as a "cross between Asteroids and Dune II". The game follows a loose story in which the player has taken a loan to start mining operations on an asteroid, and is required to pay off the debt, whilst interfering with their competitors.

The player operates insect-like 'tick' spacecraft to mine and process the ore, as well as defend their operations from opponents. Players can construct a large number of items that assist them with their mining operations, defend their base, cloak and bomb units, and upgrade their ticks. The two central objectives to a level are to generate enough sales of the ore to pay off the debt with 'credit', and, once complete, locate and enter a wormhole that randomly appears in a certain location upon the map.

== Reception ==
Reception

Review scores
Publication	Score
PC PowerPlay	61%
PC Zone	47%
Ultimate PC	45%

Klondike Moon received negative reviews. Many reviewers focused on its dated presentation, with Peter Sharpe of PC PowerPlay stating the game "brought back visions of the Commodore 64", and Lee Hyde of PC Zone concurring the graphics would have been "mediocre on C64 (and are) pathetic on PC". Reviewers critiqued the game's slow pace, with Phil Collings of Ultimate PC stating "the whole thing grinds into a terrible half when you actually get into it...there's not a lot to keep the player's attention".

Some reviewers were more forgiving of the game's shortcomings. Peter Sharpe of PC PowerPlay remarked the game was "simple but entertaining", praising that the player can "comprehensively alter the playing style by a whole gamut of options", and assessing the game as a "fun twist (on) doing resource management the light-hearted way".

Retrospective reviews have also received the game poorly. A reviewer for Home of the Underdogs dismissed Klondike Moon as a "lackluster real-time strategy game" with "poorer-than-average gameplay", singling out the cumbersome interface" as "full of obscure menu icons that look too similar to each other and (is) not readily accessible".
