= Northwest Press =

American publisher

- Status: Active
- Founded: 2010
- Founder: Zan Christensen
- Country of origin: United States
- Headquarters location: Seattle, Washington
- Publication types: Comic books, graphic novels
- Nonfiction topics: LGBT-interest
- Official website: northwestpress.com

Northwest Press is an American publisher specializing in LGBT-themed comic books and graphic novels. It was founded in 2010 by Charles "Zan" Christensen. The company publishes in print, as well as through digital channels such as ComiXology and Apple's iBooks, and also retails some similarly-themed books published independently.

== Controversy ==
Northwest has had repeated conflicts with Apple's content limitations on sales through the iBooks store. In 2011, an adaptation by Tom Bouden of Oscar Wilde's play The Importance of Being Earnest was only approved after the addition of black bars to cover partial male nudity. The technology company initially permitted the individual issues of Jon Macy's Fearful Hunter, but rejected the collected edition, then removed the issues. The satirical Al-Qaeda’s Super Secret Weapon was rejected outright. In 2016, Northwest published a self-censored version of Hard to Swallow by Justin Hall and Dave Davenport – covering the "objectionable" parts with images of apples – when the original version was rejected due to sexual content.

== Awards ==
The company's publications have won awards. Teleny and Camille by Jon Macy won the 2011 Lambda Literary Award for Gay Erotica. Anything That Loves, edited by Christensen, won the 2013 Bisexual Book Award for nonfiction. Rob Kirby's QU33R received the 2014 Ignatz Award for Outstanding Anthology. Unpacking by Steve MacIsaac was nominated for the 2019 Lambda Literary Award for LGBTQ Graphic Novels.

== Titles ==
- Absolute Power: Tales of Queer Villainy (anthology)
- Al-Qaeda’s Super Secret Weapon by Mohammad al-Mohamed Muhammad and Youssef Fakish
- The Big Book of Bisexual Trials and Errors by Elizabeth Beier
- Anything That Loves (anthology) edited by Zan Christensen
- Capitol Hillbillies by Chris Lange
- The Completely Unfabulous Social Life of Ethan Green by Eric Orner
- Dash by Dave Ebersole and Delia Gable
- Fearful Hunter by Jon Macy
- Hard to Swallow by Justin Hall and Dave Davenport
- The Importance of Being Earnest by Tom Bouden (based on the play by Oscar Wilde)
- The Lavender Menace: Tales of Queer Villainy (prose anthology)
- The Legend of Bold Riley by Leia Weathington and Jonathon Dalton
- Mama Tits Saves the World by Zan Christensen and Terry Blas
- The Mark of Aeacus by Zan Christensen and Mark Brill
- Politically InQueerect by Dylan Edwards
- Positive by Tom Bouden
- The Power Within by Zan Christensen and Mark Brill
- QU33R (anthology) edited by Rob Kirby
- Rainy Day Recess: The Complete Steven’s Comics by David Kelly
- Rise: Comics Against Bullying (anthology)
- Teleny and Camille by Jon Macy (based on the book attributed to Oscar Wilde)
- 13: The Astonishing Lives of the Neuromantics by Yves Navant
- Transposes by Dylan Edwards
- Unpacking by Steve MacIsaac
- A Waste of Time by Rick Worley
