= Joyce Farmer =

American underground comix cartoonist

- Born: Joyce Farmer; 1938 (age 87–88) Los Angeles, California
- Areas: Cartoonist, Writer, Artist, Editor
- Notable works: Tits & Clits Comix; Special Exits
- Awards: National Cartoonists Society's Graphic Novel Award, 2011; Inkpot Award, 2011

Joyce Farmer (born 1938 in Los Angeles, California) is an American underground comix cartoonist. She was a participant in the underground comix movement. With Lyn Chevli, she created the feminist anthology comic book series Tits & Clits Comix in 1972.

== Biography ==
Joyce Farmer was born in Los Angeles, California, in 1938. She briefly attended Art Center School (now ArtCenter College of Design) in Pasadena in the 1950s before dropping out. After living in Phoenix, Arizona with her first husband, in 1965, Farmer moved to Laguna Beach, California with her son. She later attended the University of California, Irvine, where she obtained a bachelor's degree in the Classics.

In 1972, Joyce Farmer and Lyn Chevli founded Nanny Goat Productions, a feminist publishing company which they established in order to publish their own underground comix, Tits & Clits Comix. Nanny Goat Productions published seven issues of Tits & Clits Comix in total, in addition to another underground comic book titled Pandoras Box (1973).

In June 1973, following the Roe v. Wade Supreme Court decision on abortion, Farmer and Chevli published Abortion Eve, an educational comic begun the year before about women's reproductive rights. Drawing upon their experiences as birth control and pregnancy counselors at Laguna's Free Clinic, the single-issue comic book presented the stories of five women – all of them named variations on Eve, each in differing circumstances – going through obtaining an abortion. Farmer later shared about her personal experience with abortion, which partially inspired the comic.

Some of Farmer's earliest cartooning work is signed Joyce Sutton, causing people to believe this is her birth name, rather than her husband’s last name. She changed her legal name back to Farmer in the mid-1970s.

In 1973, Farmer and Chevli were forced to stop producing underground comix due to the arrest of local booksellers from Fahrenheit 451 Books on obscenity charges for selling underground comix. They resumed publishing Tits & Clits Comix in 1976. While their first few comics (Tits & Clits Comix α, Pandoras Box, Abortion Eve, Tits & Clits #2, and Tits & Clits #3) were created solely by Farmer and Chevli, beginning with issue #4 the women of Nanny Goat Productions invited other contributors to their comic, including Trina Robbins, Lee Marrs, Sharon Rudahl, Shelby Sampson, and others. Farmer and Chevli acted as editors for the series.

During the 1970s and 1980s, Farmer also contributed to the other all-woman underground comix anthology, Wimmen's Comix, in addition to other underground comix such as Wet Satin. She later acted as the editor for Wimmen's Comix #10: The Internationally Politically Incorrect Issue (1985).

In 1980, Chevli sold her share of Nanny Goat Productions to Farmer. Farmer published one final issue of Tits & Clits Comix, Tits & Clits #7 with co-editor Mary Fleener, in 1987, before ceasing publishing underground comix.

Since she never made much money from underground comics, Farmer struggled financially occasionally through the 1970s and 1980s. Farmer worked as a bail bondsman in addition to her cartooning, even opening her own bail bonds business in the early 1980s.

Farmer began to care of her aging father and stepmother in the 1990s. She started documenting in comics form the sad and sometimes humorous episodes of her parents' final years, sending samples to former fellow underground cartoonist Robert Crumb. Crumb convinced her to finish the book. Fantagraphics published this graphic memoir in 2010 under the title Special Exits. Because of Farmer's macular degeneration, Special Exits took her 13 years to complete.

Farmer's work has also appeared in anthologies such as ZeroZero (2000), What Right (2002), No Straight Lines (2012), Best American Comics (2012), Graphic Reproduction (2018), Drawing Power (2019), and Menopause (2020).

In 2023, Fantagraphics issued a collection of all of Nanny Goat Productions' comic books, Tits & Clits 1972-1987.

== Awards ==
In 2011, Special Exits won the National Cartoonists Society's Graphic Novel Award.
