= Lyn Chevli =

American cartoonist

- Born: Marilyn Keith; December 24, 1931 Milford, Connecticut
- Died: October 8, 2016 (aged 84) Laguna Beach, California
- Areas: Cartoonist, Writer, Editor, Publisher
- Pseudonyms: Lyn Chevely; Chin Lyvely; Edna MacBrayne
- Notable works: Tits & Clits Comix; Abortion Eve; Pandoras Box Comix

Lyn Chevli (December 24, 1931 – October 8, 2016), also credited as Lyn Chevely and Chin Lyvely, was an American cartoonist who participated in the underground comix movement. With Joyce Farmer, she created the feminist comic-book anthology series Tits & Clits Comix (1972–1987) and Abortion Eve (1973), an educational comic book about women's newly-guaranteed reproductive rights.

== Biography ==
Lyn Chevli was born in Milford, Connecticut, on December 24, 1931, as Marilyn Keith. She graduated from Skidmore College in New York and exhibited at the International Festival of Arts and Sawdust Festival as a silversmith and then sculptor. She married Narendrakumar Aditram Chevli, with whom she lived briefly in Mumbai. After moving to the U.S. she had two daughters, Neela (born 1957) and Shanta (born 1959). She and her children moved to California with her mother in 1961.

She ran Fahrenheit 451 Books with her husband Dennis Madison in Dana Point, and then from Laguna Beach from 1968. The store specialized in new age literature. Chevli was the designated owner of the store because she already had a reseller license in California.

Fahrenheit 451 carried the new underground comix, which impressed Chevli with their anarchic spirit, but she was concerned with their male-centered content. She sold the book store in 1972. That year, Chevli and Joyce Farmer founded Nanny Goat Productions in order to publish their own feminist comics. They published the first issue of Tits & Clits Comix (Tits & Clits Comix α) in July 1972, preceding Wimmen's Comix by a few weeks. Its first printing of 20,000 copies sold out by the next year.

In June 1973, following the Roe v. Wade Supreme Court decision on abortion, Chevli and Farmer published Abortion Eve, an educational comic begun the year before about women's reproductive rights. Drawing upon their experiences as birth control and pregnancy counselors at Laguna's Free Clinic, the single-issue comic book presented the stories of five women – all of them named variations on Eve, each in differing circumstances – going through the process of obtaining abortions.

Because the series' title limited its exposure, the second issue appeared in 1973 under the title Pandoras Box Comix [sic]. Around this time, sellers of underground comix faced prosecution for selling obscene material. The new owners of Fahrenheit 451 were arrested in December 1973 for selling underground comix, though the charges were later dropped with help from the American Civil Liberties Union. Nevertheless, Chevli and Farmer stopped publishing underground comix until 1976 due to the fear of being arrested or prosecuted.

The series returned to its original title in 1976, with the publication of Tits & Clits Comix #2. Chevli stopped contributing drawings and stories to Tits & Clits after the third issue, but continued as co-editor through its sixth issue. In 1980, Chevli sold her share of Nanny Goat Productions to Joyce Farmer.

Chevli turned to prose in 1981 when she published an erotic book for women titled Alida under the pseudonym Edna McBrayne. She wrote pieces for a number of publications, including local gay magazine The Blade. She wrote two unpublished memoirs, one about her time in underground comix and another about her life in the 1950s, when she married and moved to India.

Chevli died in Laguna Beach on October 8, 2016, of age-related causes.
