= Justin Hall (cartoonist) =

American cartoonist and educator (born 1971)

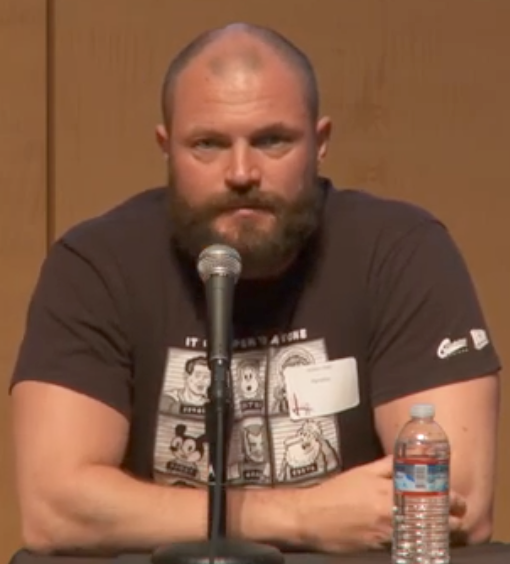
- In a panel discussion in 2017
- Born: Justin Robinson Hall; February 14, 1971 (age 55)
- Area: Cartoonist
- Notable works: No Straight Lines

Justin Robinson Hall (born February 14, 1971) is an American cartoonist and educator. He has written and illustrated autobiographical and erotic comics, and edited No Straight Lines, a scholarly overview of LGBT comics of the previous 40 years. He is an Associate Professor of Comics and Writing-and-Literature at the California College of the Arts.

== Career ==
Cover of Hard to Swallow #2, cover by Justin Hall

Hall began creating comics in 2001. His first published work was A Sacred Text, about seeing the Dead Sea Scrolls in Israel, published with funding from a Xeric Grant. He followed this with True Travel Tales, an anecdotal series about more of his international backpacking experiences. Next he and Dave Davenport produced Hard to Swallow, a 4-issue series of gay erotica that was later collected into a single volume by Northwest Press in 2016.

He served as the talent relations chair for the LGBT advocacy organization Prism Comics. He published Glamazonia about a caricatural trans superhero, in 2010; it was nominated for a Lambda Literary Award. His work has been published in the San Francisco Bay Guardian, The Book of Boy Trouble, The Best Erotic Comics series, and Best American Comics 2006.

In 2006, he curated the art exhibition "No Straight Lines: Queer Culture in Comics" with Andrew Farago of the Cartoon Art Museum in San Francisco. This led to the 2012 book No Straight Lines: Four Decades of Queer Comics, a hardcover overview of LGBTQ comics history published by Fantagraphics, for which he won a Lambda Literary Award and an Eisner nomination.

He began teaching comics at the California College of the Arts in the early 2010s; in 2014, he added instruction for a Masters-level degree in the subject. In 2016 he received a grant as a Fulbright scholar to guest lecture at Masaryk University in Brno, Czech Republic.

In February 2013, Hall co-curated with Rick Worley the San Francisco art exhibit "Batman on Robin", featuring works exploring the theme of homoeroticism between Batman and Robin.

Beginning in 2015, he has co-organized – with Jennifer Camper – "Queers & Comics", a biennial conference of international LGBTQ cartoonists, academics, and other professionals, focusing on LGBTQ themes in comics and LGBTQ comics creators.

== Personal life ==
Hall and his husband live in San Francisco.
