= No Straight Lines =

Anthology of queer comics

No Straight Lines: Four Decades of Queer Comics
- The front cover of the first edition (hardcover)
- Editor: Justin Hall
- Language: English
- Genre: Anthology
- Publisher: Fantagraphics Books
- Publication date: August 1, 2012
- Publication place: United States
- Media type: Print (hardback and paperback), digital
- Pages: 304
- ISBN: 978-1-60699-718-5

No Straight Lines: Four Decades of Queer Comics is an anthology of queer comics covering a 40-year period from the late 1960s to the late 2000s. It was edited by Justin Hall and published by Fantagraphics Books on August 1, 2012.

The anthology traces the turning points in the history of LGBTQ comics over the 40-year period, including events such as the AIDS crisis. It features work from established cartoonists such as Alison Bechdel, Howard Cruse, Roberta Gregory, Eric Shanower, and Paige Braddock, as well as then-up-and-coming cartoonists including Ellen Forney, Erika Moen, Ariel Schrag, and Dylan Edwards.

== Development ==
Editor Justin Hall was inspired to put together the anthology after curating a show of LGBT comics at the Cartoon Art Museum for the San Francisco Pride in 2006. According to Hall, despite the prevalence of gay male erotica in the underground comics scene since the late 1950s, LGBT literary comics become a subgenre only after the 1969 Stonewall riots, when a "sense of community" emerged and the queer underground comix scene began to thrive in San Francisco. With this anthology, Hall wanted to document, preserve and celebrate the "hidden history" of queer comics.

Hall selected the works to include based on, in decreasing order of importance, "artistic merit, historic merit and representational merit". He explained that: "First and foremost, No Straight Lines should be a tremendously good read. After that, it should leave the reader with a better understanding of the complex history and diversity of LGBTQ comics".

Filmmaker and transgender woman Lana Wachowski wrote an introduction to the book.

== Themes ==
To put the material into an "historical and cultural context", the anthology is organized into three sections. The first section, "Comics Come Out: Gay Gag Strips, Underground Comix, and Lesbian Literati", covers the late-1960s and 1970s. It collects gag cartoons from early gay newspapers and magazines that emerged after the Stonewall riots, as well as works from the feminist and lesbian-oriented underground comix, concluding with the creation of the anthology series Gay Comix. This section includes Trina Robbins' Sandy Comes Out, which according to Hall was the first literary comic that "offered gay people a representation of themselves that validated, as opposed to degraded, their experience."

The second section, "File Under Queer: Comix to Comics, Punk Zines, and Art During the Plague", covers the 1980s and 1990s time period, focusing on the artistic responses to the AIDS crisis, as well as the emergence of punk zines and mini-comics. The third section, "A New Millenium: Trans Creators, Webcomics, and Stepping Out of the Ghetto," features work from the increasing number of transgender cartoonists, and details the shift in queer comics from queer comics media towards the internet and crossing over into the mainstream.

== Reception ==
Publishers Weekly noted that many of the comics "hit on concerns and experiences that cut to the heart of the human soul, not just the gay one", and concluded that Hall was "quite successful" at gearing the anthology towards a wider audience beyond the LGBT community, "but without softening the edges that define the genre". Writing for The New York Times Book Review, Glen Weldon felt that "the decision to restrict selections to the Western world is disappointing but understandable", and concluded that No Straight Lines was a "useful, combative and frequently moving chronicle of a culture in perpetual transition". Lee Mandelo of Tor.com wrote that the book was "a great read, not just for the stories alone but for what they represent together: a history, a genealogy, or LGBTQ writers and artists telling stories that reflect their experiences and knowledge of the world".

Writing for The American Library Association's Gay, Lesbian, Bisexual, and Transgender Round Table, Talia Earle called the book "absolutely fascinating, especially in giving the reader a wide variety of topics impacting the GLBT community". Cathy Camper of the Lambda Literary Foundation praised Hall for taking on the "mountainous" task of compiling a historical collection of queer comics, concluding that he "delivered a classic compilation of stories that promises readers of comics everywhere something wonderful to read".

No Straight Lines won Best LGBT Anthology at the 25th Lambda Literary Awards. The volume was also nominated for the 2013 Eisner Award for Best Anthology.

== Documentary ==
A feature-length documentary film inspired by the book, No Straight Lines: The Rise of Queer Comics was completed in 2021, with a world premiere at that year's Tribeca Film Festival.
