= Misty (Marvel Comics) =

Fictional character in the Marvel Comics universe

- Misty on the cover of Misty #1 (December 1985), art by Trina Robbins

Publication information
- Publisher: Marvel Comics
- First appearance: Misty #1 (December 1985)
- Created by: Trina Robbins

In-story information
- Full name: Misty Collins
- Species: Human
- Notable aliases: Mall Girl
Misty
Publication information
- Publisher: Star Comics
- Schedule: Bimonthly
- Format: Limited series
- Genre: Comedy; Romance
- Publication date: December 1985 – October 1986
- No. of issues: 6
Creative team
- Written by: Trina Robbins
- Artist: Trina Robbins
- Letterer(s): Jim Novak; Rick Parker; Joe Rosen; L. Lois Buhalis
- Colorist(s): Marie Severin; Elaine Lee
- Editor: Ann Nocenti

Misty is a comic book character who has appeared in a series published by Marvel Comics via their Star Comics imprint for younger readers. Created by Trina Robbins, Misty was the star of her own 1985-1986 limited series, Misty (sometimes referred to as Meet Misty), a humor title aimed at young female readers. Following the end of the series, Robbins would make a similar title for Eclipse Comics, California Girls. The character exists in Marvel's main shared universe, known as the Marvel Universe.

== Creation ==
Trina Robbins had spent much of the seventies working in underground comix with a distinct feminist bent, including co-founding the seminal Wimmen's Comix. She, however, had fond memories of the girl comics she had bought growing up, particularly Timely Comics' titles Millie the Model and Patsy and Hedy, and realised the lack of similar titles meant there was nothing to inspire future female creators. When she heard Marvel Comics (the present-day incarnation of Timely) was planning Star Comics to reach younger readers, Robbins approached the company with a pitch for a girls' comic, showing her samples to Marvel's editor-in-chief Jim Shooter at the 1983 San Diego Comics Convention. Inspired by Robbins' love of Bill Woggon's Katy Keene, the series also included paper dolls (a recurring feature of Robbins' comics) and audience interaction via reader-submitted outfit designs. Robbins would credit Shooter's early career work on Millie the Model as a factor in the series getting the green light.

She brainstormed the concept with Marvel executive editor Tom DeFalco, who suggested the character be something other than an objectified model. Robbins heartily agreed, devising a storyline that would see the lead, then under the working name of 'Kristy' become a soap actress. She hoped the characters would be an "upgrade" on Archie Comics characters such as Betty Cooper and Veronica Lodge, noting "All Betty and Veronica do is fight over Archie... the girls [in Misty] all have ambitions in life" and noted she purposefully avoided the leading character being part of a nuclear family "because this is 1984". Robbins also said she was "blatantly" aiming for female readers "because girls don't have anything to read". A further link to the Timely books was created by reviving Millie herself as Misty's aunt. Misty would be Robbins' first work for a major comic publisher and she would later describe it as "her calling".

The first issue ended with a letter from 'Misty', accompanied by a drawing of the character wearing a barrel, appealing for readers to send in their own designs. In the meantime, Robbins encouraged other comics figures she knew to submit designs while she awaited reader submissions, leading to contributions from Barb Rausch, Mike Madrid, Dori Seda, Michael Goldberg, Steve Leialoha, Sharon Rudahl, Gilbert Hernandez, Lori Walls, Jackie Estrada, Terry Beatty, Martha Thomases - and Robbins' daughter Casey, while Mike Mignola contributed raccoons to the third issue.

== Publication history ==
The first issue of Misty was published in August 1985 (cover dated December). The series was a six-issue miniseries, with plans to continue if sales were strong. Misty soon started generating considerable quantities of fan mail, including numerous reader submissions for character outfits. Robbins however noted that the series "failed miserably" from a commercial point of view due to comic shops being uninterested in stocking female-oriented comics. Despite receiving many letters from readers (many noting how hard it was to find the comic), sales were not strong enough to justify any further Misty comics after the initial limited series.

Shortly after Misty ended, Robbins would make another attempt to connect with young female readers with California Girls, a similar title published by independent publisher Eclipse Comics.

== Plot ==
Two hours' drive from New York City, in the small town of Shady Hollow teenager Misty Collins dreams of being an Oscar-winning actress. She lives with her father, her aunt Millie and a cat called Cuddles. Misty hopes to use a beauty contest by Heaventeen Magazine to launch her onto the popular local soap As the Cookie Crumbles. Her best friends are fellow Shady Hollow High School students Spike and Shirelle, where they frequently clash with spoilt rich girl Darlene. Wearing a 1955 dress her aunt had kept from her modelling career, and wins the contest with a touching recital of scenes from Romeo and Juliet, meeting leading man Ricky Martin and wins the chance for audition for the role of his fiancée Loretta in As the Cookie Crumbles. As Darlene's father is the sponsor of the soap he pulls strings to get her the part instead, with a crushed Misty instead cast in a bit part. During filming, however, Misty's talent soon impresses the director, and the producers rapidly decide to expand her role.

This means she has to balance her schoolwork and friends with her acting career, and grows closer to Ricky. Through Misty's growing fame, Millie is able to restart her own modelling career. After accidentally switching shorts with Darlene, Misty is briefly concerned that she is anorexic. Later, after buying a dress from a mysterious shop she briefly gains superpowers and embarks on a career as the superhero Mall Girl, foiling a mugging (getting mistaken for Kitty Pryde and Illyana), but loses them when she washes the dress. When she returns to the mall with Shirelle, the shop is gone.

== Characters ==
- Misty Collins is a friendly, fashionable teenager and talented actress (though somewhat accident-prone). She is a fan of William Shakespeare, rock singer Billy Active (singer of "Rebel Yell"), comic books, and playing basketball. Despite her rapid ascension to local celebrity she remains grounded and kind and continues to help those in the community. The only person she does not have time for is spoilt rival Darlene.
- Shirelle Brown is a level-headed classmate and good friend of Misty who is a fan of Michael Jackson (performing a dance to "Ease On down the Road" from The Wiz in the Heaventeen Talent contest), Prince, collecting stickers, and aerobics.
- Spike is also a classmate and good friend of Misty. Spike is a punk girl, usually with a dyed Mohawk; a running joke is that her hair changes colour frequently. She is initially the lead singer, guitarist and songwriter for band Spike and the Spikettes, the only other members being a drummer and a pair of back-up singers but later starts a new band called The Rad Warriors. She can be quick to anger.
- Darlene Dunderbeck is the redheaded only child of the richest man in town, which causes her to look down on Misty and her friends. Darlene has a cruel streak, and her act for the talent contest is her impression of a flower, which involves her simply holding a ballet pose. She is a malicious gossip who generally buys the friendship of others with gifts but her attempts to prank Misty and her friends usually backfire. Darlene's acting skills are poor, largely due to her inability to acknowledge any criticism or learn her lines but she is good at video games. She does attempt to work with Misty to avoid them both being upstaged by starlet Lake Lovelock, but Misty's innate goodness undermines the pair's schemes. Darlene has a wider posterior than her rival and is two weeks older. She owns a poodle called Fifi.
- Millie Collins is Misty's aunt and a former model, who keeps many souvenirs from her former career. Her celebrity leads to her accidentally upstaging Misty at a Heaventeen fashion shoot and work as a mature model.
- Ricky Martin is a teen heartthrob and male lead of As the Cookie Crumbles. He encourages Misty's acting career and swiftly becomes close to her.
- R.J. Rittenhouse is the producer of As the Cookie Crumbles.
- Anton DeCarlo is a director of As the Cookie Crumbles.
- Mr. Collins is Misty's father and a teacher at the local college. Misty credits him for her love of Shakespeare.
- The Horseless Horseman is the ghost of patriot Ebeneezer van der Wood, who has haunted Shady Hollow since Redcoats shot his horse out from under him as he tried to warn townsfolk during the American Revolutionary War.
- Lake Lovelock is an established Los Angeles-based actress who guest-stars on As the Cookie Crumbles and is in a relationship with rock-star Billy Active.

== Power and abilities ==
Misty Collins has no superpowers, though she briefly gains increased strength and the ability to fly after buying a magic superhero costume from a mysterious boutique.

== Reception ==
Reviewing Misty #5 for Amazing Heroes, Chris Meier expressed reservations about some of the simplistic tropes used by the series but whole-heartedly supported it for successfully connecting with a young female audience, something he felt was vital for the future of the medium. Slings and Arrows considered the series "lightweight" fun, and praised Robbins' art.

Analysing Misty along with similar genre 1980s comics Angel Love and Amethyst in The Other 1980s, Aaron Kashtan considered the title a "path not taken", contrasting the humorous titles with the darker turn the wider industry was taking at the time with the likes of Watchmen. Conversely Topless Robot named Misty as the 5th worst Star Comics title in 2012, negatively comparing it with cartoon Jem.
