= Trina Robbins =

American cartoonist and writer (1938–2024)

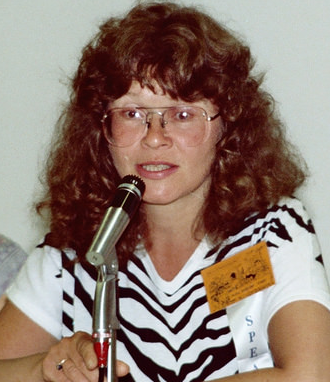
- Robbins in 1982
- Born: Trina Perlson; August 17, 1938 New York City, U.S.
- Died: April 10, 2024 (aged 85) San Francisco, California, U.S.
- Areas: Cartoonist, Writer, Artist, Editor
- Notable works: It Ain't Me, Babe; Wimmen's Comix; Wonder Woman; Women and the Comics
- Awards: Inkpot Award (1977); Special John Buscema Haxtur Award (2002); Will Eisner Hall of Fame (2013)
- Partner: Steve Leialoha (from 1977)
- Spouse: Paul Robbins (m. 1962; div. 1966)
- Children: 1

Trina Robbins (née Perlson; August 17, 1938 – April 10, 2024) was an American cartoonist. She was an early participant in the underground comix movement, and one of the first women in the movement. She co-produced the 1970 underground comic It Ain't Me, Babe, which was the first comic book entirely created by women. She co-founded the Wimmen's Comix collective, wrote for Wonder Woman, and produced adaptations of Dope and The Silver Metal Lover. She was inducted into the Will Eisner Hall of Fame in 2013 and received Eisner Awards in 2017 and 2021.

As a scholar and historian, Robbins researched the history of women in cartooning. She wrote several nonfiction books including Women and the Comics (1985), A Century of Women Cartoonists (1993), The Great Women Superheroes (1996), From Girls to Grrrlz (1999), Pretty in Ink (2013), and Flapper Queens: Women Cartoonists of the Jazz Age (2020). She co-founded the organization Friends of Lulu in 1993.

== Early life and education ==
Trina Perlson was born on August 17, 1938, in Brooklyn, New York City, to Jewish immigrants originally from Belarus. Her mother was an elementary school teacher. Her father Max B. Perlson was a tailor who also wrote for Yiddish-language newspapers; his short stories were collected and published in book form in 1938. She grew up in South Ozone Park, Queens, and held an early fascination with comic book heroines, especially Sheena, Queen of the Jungle. As a teenager, she attended science fiction fan conventions.

Robbins attended Queens College in New York, and dropped out. She then attended Cooper Union for a year, where she studied drawing. She moved to California in 1960, settling in Los Angeles. There she attempted to start a career in the movies, including by appearing nude in men's magazines such as Rogue. She returned to New York in 1966 and lived in Manhattan's East Village, where she worked as a stylist and ran a clothing boutique called "Broccoli". In the late 1960s, she designed clothes for Mama Cass, Donovan, David Crosby, among others. She was intimately involved in the 1960s rock scene, where she was close friends with Jim Morrison and members of The Byrds. Robbins was the first of the three "Ladies of the Canyon" in Joni Mitchell's classic song from the album of the same name.

== Career ==
=== Early work ===
Robbins was an active member of science fiction fandom in the 1950s and 1960s. Her illustrations appeared in science fiction fanzines like the Hugo-nominated Habakkuk.

=== Comics ===
Robbins' first comics were printed in the East Village Other in 1966; she also contributed to the spin-off underground comic Gothic Blimp Works in 1969. That same year, she designed a one-piece costume for the Warren Publishing character Vampirella for artist Frank Frazetta in Vampirella #1 (September 1969).

Robbins left New York for San Francisco in 1970, and that year she co-produced the first all-woman comic book, the one-shot It Ain't Me, Babe Comix, with fellow female artist Barbara "Willy" Mendes. The book is a feminist satire on gender stereotypes in comics. Robbins became involved in creating outlets for and promoting female comics artists, through projects such as the comics anthology Wimmen's Comix, with which she was involved for twenty years. Wimmen's Comix #1 featured Robbins' "Sandy Comes Out", the first comic strip featuring an "out" lesbian. During this time, Robbins also became a contributor to the San Francisco-based underground paper Good Times, along with art director Harry Driggs and Guy Colwell.

Robbins spoke out against the misogyny and "boy's club" of comics creators, criticizing underground comix artist Robert Crumb for the perceived misogyny of many of his comics, saying, "It's weird to me how willing people are to overlook the hideous darkness in Crumb's work ... What the hell is funny about rape and murder?"

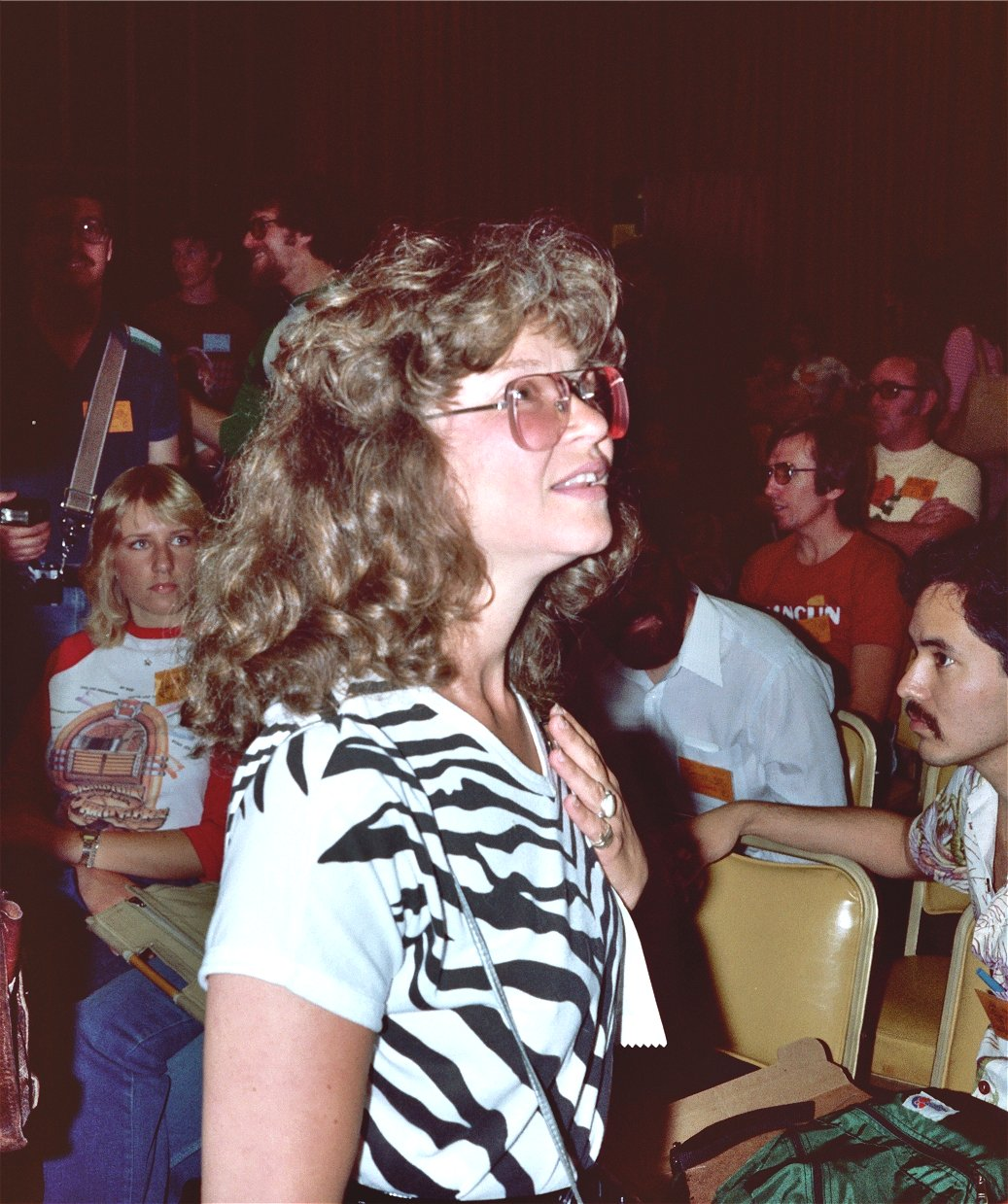
Robbins at the Women In Comics panel at the 1982 San Diego Comic-Con

In the early 1980s, Robbins created adaptations of Sax Rohmer's Dope and Tanith Lee's The Silver Metal Lover. In the mid-1980s she wrote and drew Misty for the Marvel Comics children's imprint Star Comics, Misty being a niece of the long-standing Marvel character Millie the Model. She followed Misty with California Girls, an eight-issue series about teenagers published by Eclipse Comics in 1987–1988.

In 1990, Robbins edited and contributed to Choices: A Pro-Choice Benefit Comic Anthology for the National Organization for Women, published under Robbins' own imprint, Angry Isis Press. The all-star list of contributors, mostly women, included representatives of the underground — Lee Marrs, Sharon Rudahl, Harry Driggs, Diane Noomin, Harry S. Robins, and Robbins herself; alternative — Nina Paley, Phoebe Gloeckner, Reed Waller & Kate Worley, Roberta Gregory, Norman Dog, and Steve Lafler; queer — Leslie Ewing, Jennifer Camper, Alison Bechdel, Angela Bocage, Jackie Urbanovic, Howard Cruse, Robert Triptow, and M. J. Goldberg; and mainstream — Cynthia Martin, Barbara Slate, Mindy Newell, Ramona Fradon, Steve Leialoha, William Messner-Loebs, and Bill Koeb — comics communities. A number of contributors — Nicole Hollander, Cathy Guisewite, Garry Trudeau, Bill Griffith, and Jules Feiffer — were comic strip creators whose work in the anthology was reprinted from their syndicated strips.

In 2000 Robbins introduced GoGirl! — stories about a second generation teen superhero with the power to fly, designed to appeal to young girls. Robbins wrote the stories, with Anne Timmons providing the bulk of the art. The series ran for five issues with Image Comics, and then was picked up by Dark Horse Comics, with the final issue coming out in 2006.

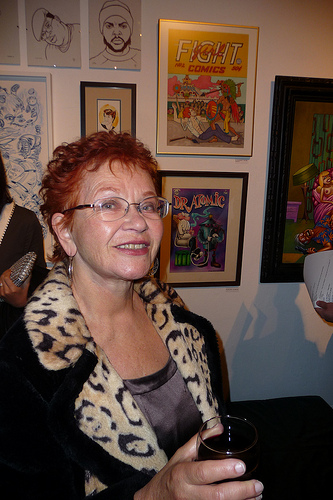
Robbins at a 2010 underground comix art exhibit in San Francisco, California

In 2010, she began writing comic adventures of the woman detective character Honey West for a series published by Moonstone Books.

==== Wonder Woman ====
Robbins' official involvement with Wonder Woman began in 1986. At the conclusion of the first volume of the series (in conjunction with the series Crisis on Infinite Earths), DC Comics published a four-issue limited series titled The Legend of Wonder Woman, written by Kurt Busiek and drawn by Robbins. The series paid homage to the character's Golden Age roots. She also appeared as herself in Wonder Woman Annual 2 (1989).

In the mid-1990s, Robbins criticized artist Mike Deodato's "bad girl art" portrayal of Wonder Woman, calling Deodato's version of the character a "barely clothed hypersexual pinup."

In the late 1990s, Robbins collaborated with Colleen Doran on the DC Comics graphic novel Wonder Woman: The Once and Future Story, on the subject of spousal abuse.

=== Writing and activism ===
She worked on the newspaper It Ain't Me, Babe, a newspaper published in 1970 by Berkeley Women's Liberation, a feminist organization. The paper has been called "the first feminist newspaper," although that distinction may only be accurate within second-wave feminism in the United States.

Robbins was also an author of nonfiction books on the history of women in cartooning. Her first book, co-written with Catherine Yronwode, was Women and the Comics, a history of female comic-strip and comic-book creators. Subsequent Robbins volumes on women in the comics industry include A Century of Women Cartoonists (Kitchen Sink, 1993), The Great Women Superheroes (Kitchen Sink, 1997), From Girls to Grrrlz: A History of Women's Comics from Teens to Zines (Chronicle, 1999), and The Great Women Cartoonists (Watson-Guptill, 2001). Her later work included Pretty In Ink, published by Fantagraphics in 2013, which covers the history of North American women in comics dating from Rose O'Neill's 1896 strip The Old Subscriber Calls. Robbins was a co-founder of Friends of Lulu, a nonprofit formed in 1994 to promote readership of comic books by women and the participation of women in the comic book industry. Robbins is featured in the feminist history film She's Beautiful When She's Angry.

== Personal life and death ==
In 1962, she married Paul Jay Robbins in Los Angeles; they divorced four years later. Robbins also had a daughter with cartoonist Kim Deitch. She wrote a memoir entitled Last Girl Standing, released in 2017 by Fantagraphics.

Robbins died after a stroke in San Francisco, California, on April 10, 2024, at the age of 85. Her partner was artist Steve Leialoha from 1977 until her death.

== Awards and recognition ==
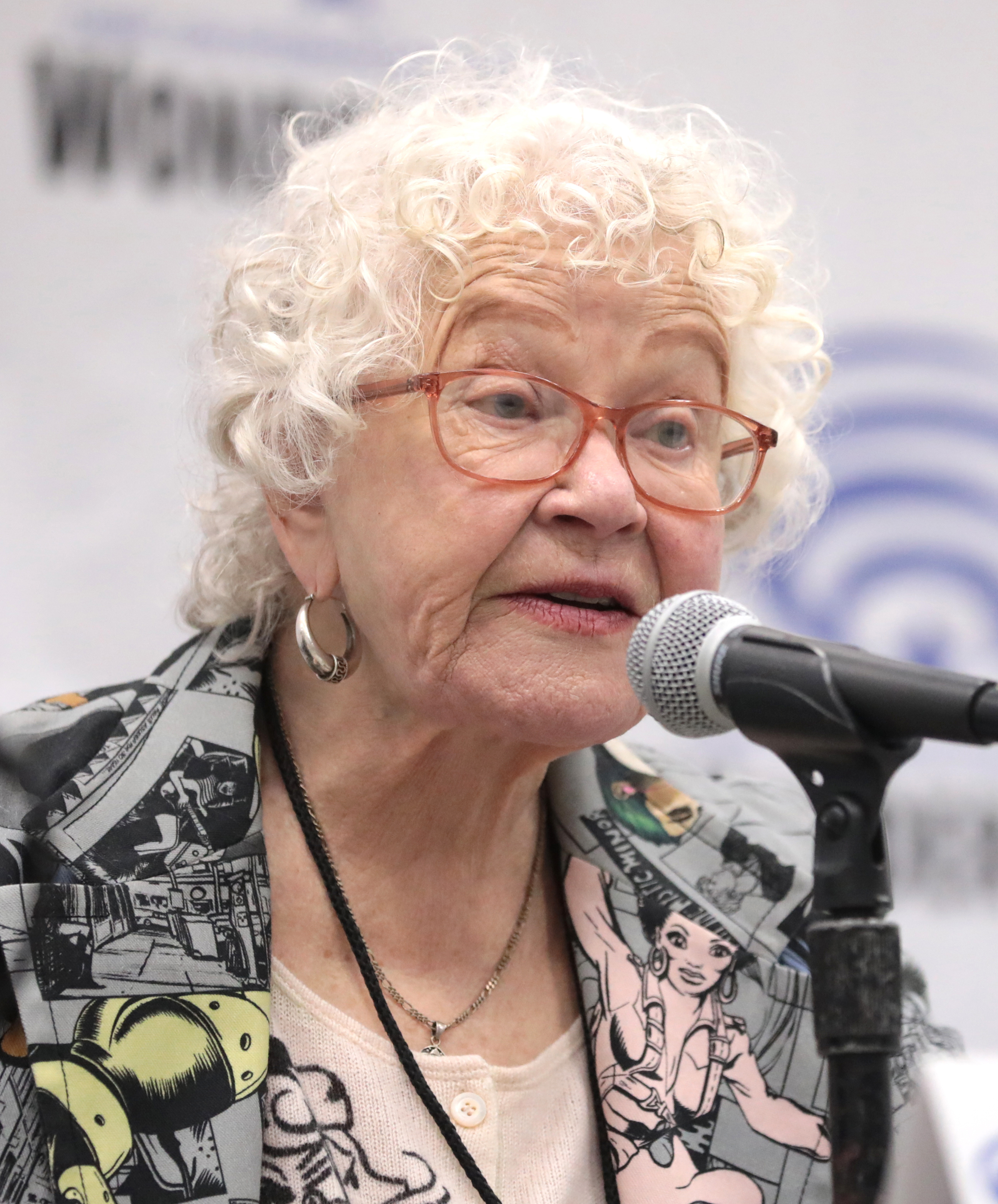
Robbins in 2023

Robbins discussing her career in 2016

Robbins was a Special Guest of the 1977 San Diego Comic-Con, when she was presented with an Inkpot Award. She won a Special Achievement Award from San Diego Comic-Con in 1989 for her work on Strip AIDS U.S.A., a benefit book that she co-edited with Bill Sienkiewicz and Robert Triptow. She was the 1992 Guest of Honor of WisCon, the Wisconsin Science Fiction Convention.

Robbins was a three-time winner of the Lulu of the Year award — in 1997, for her book The Great Women Superheroes; in 2000 for her book From Girls to Grrrlz; and in 2001 (along with co-author Anne Timmons) for Go-Girl!. From Girls to Grrrlz also won a 2000 Firecracker Alternative Book Award. In 2001, Robbins was inaugurated into the Friends of Lulu Women Cartoonists Hall of Fame. In 2002, Robbins was given the Special John Buscema Haxtur Award, a recognition for comics published in Spain. In 2011, Robbins' artwork was exhibited as part of the Koffler Gallery show Graphic Details: Confessional Comics by Jewish Women.

In July 2013, during San Diego Comic-Con, Robbins was one of six inductees into the Will Eisner Hall of Fame. The award was presented by Mad magazine cartoonist and Groo the Wanderer creator Sergio Aragonés. The other inductees were Lee Falk, Al Jaffee, Mort Meskin, Joe Sinnott, and Spain Rodriguez.

In a 2015 poll, Robbins was ranked #25 among the best female comics creators of all-time. ComicsAlliance listed Robbins as one of twelve women cartoonists deserving of lifetime achievement recognition in 2016. In 2017, Robbins was chosen for the Wizard World Hall of Legends. Robbins' art and art from her collection of the work of women cartoonists was featured in the 2020 Society of Illustrators exhibit "Women in Comics: Looking Forward, Looking Back". It was later featured in the "Women in Comics" exhibit at the Palazzo Merulana in Rome, Italy.

== Bibliography ==
=== Comics ===
As writer/artist, unless otherwise noted

==== Major works ====
- It Ain't Me, Babe Comix (Last Gasp, 1970)—co-founder, contributor
- All Girl Thrills (Print Mint, 1971)—editor, contributor
- Wimmen's Comix (Last Gasp, Renegade Press, Rip Off Press, 1972–1992)—co-founder, contributor
- Mama! Dramas (Educomics, June 1978)—editor and contributor, along with Suzy Varty, Joyce Farmer, and others
- Dope (Eclipse Comics, 1981–1983)—adaptation of the Sax Rohmer novel
- The Silver Metal Lover (Crown Books, 1985)—adaptation of the Tanith Lee novel
- Misty (Star Comics, 1985–1986)—limited series
- The Legend of Wonder Woman (DC Comics, 1986)—limited series
- California Girls #1–8 (Eclipse Comics, 1987–1988)—writer/artist, with contributions from Barb Rausch
- Strip AIDS U.S.A.: A Collection of Cartoon Art to Benefit People with AIDS (Last Gasp, 1988)—co-editor with Bill Sienkiewicz and Robert Triptow
- Choices: A Pro-Choice Benefit Comic Anthology for the National Organization for Women (Angry Isis Press, 1990)—editor and contributor
- Wonder Woman: The Once and Future Story (DC Comics, 1998)—writer; drawn by Colleen Doran
- GoGirl! #1–5 (Image Comics, 2000–2001)—writer
- GoGirl! #1–3 (Dark Horse Comics, 2002–2006)—writer; issues #2–3 feature all new material
- Honey West #1, 2, 6, 7 (Moonstone Books, 2010)—writer
- Honey West and The Cat #1–2 (Moonstone Books, 2013)—writer
- Won't Back Down (Last Gasp, 2023)—editor

==== Anthology contributions ====
- East Village Other (late 1960s)
- Gothic Blimp Works (East Village Other, 1969)
- Moonchild Comix #3 (Nicola Cuti; Moonchild Productions, September 1970)
- Swift Comics (Bantam Books, 1971)
- Girl Fight Comics #1–2 (Print Mint, 1972, 1974)
- Tuff Shit Comics (Print Mint, 1972)
- Barbarian Comics #4 (California Comics, 1972)
- Comix Book (Marvel Comics, Kitchen Sink Press, 1974–1976)
- Wet Satin (1976)—editor
- Tits & Clits Comix #3 (Nanny Goat Productions, 1977)
- Gates of Eden (FantaCo Enterprises, 1982)
- Gay Comix #6, #11, #25 (Bob Ross, 1985, 1986, 1998)
- War News (Jim Mitchell, 1991)—underground newspaper launched to protest the first Gulf War.
- 9-11: September 11, 2001 (Artists Respond) (Dark Horse Comics/Chaos! Comics/Image Comics, 2002)
- The Phantom Chronicles (Moonstone Books, 2007)
- Girl Comics (Marvel Comics, 2010)

=== Nonfiction ===
- —; Yronwode, Catherine (1985). Women and the Comics. Eclipse Books. ISBN 0-913035-01-7.
- — (1993). A Century of Women Cartoonists. Kitchen Sink Press. ISBN 0-87816-206-2.
- — (1996). The Great Women Superheroes. Kitchen Sink Press. ISBN 0-87816-482-0.
- — (1999). From Girls to Grrrlz: A History of Comics from Teens to Zines. Chronicle Books. ISBN 0-8118-2199-4.
- — (2001). The Great Women Cartoonists. Watson-Guptill. ISBN 0-8230-2170-X.
- — (2001). Nell Brinkley and the New Woman in the Early 20th Century. McFarland & Co. ISBN 0-7864-1151-1.
- — (2001). Eternally Bad: Goddesses with Attitude. Conari Press. ISBN 1-57324-550-X.
- — (2003). Tender Murderers: Women Who Kill. Conari Press. ISBN 1-57324-821-5.
- — (2004). Wild Irish Roses: Tales of Brigits, Kathleens, and Warrior Queens. Conari Press. ISBN 1-57324-952-1.
- Robbins, Trina (2004). "Chapter 6: Girls on Top?". In Skinn, Dez (ed.). Comix: The Underground Revolution. Collins & Brown/Thunder's Mouth. ISBN 1-84340-186-X.
- —, ed. (2009). The Brinkley Girls: The Best of Nell Brinkley's Cartoons from 1913–1940. Fantagraphics Books. ISBN 978-1-56097-970-8.
- — (2009). Forbidden City: The Golden Age of Chinese Nightclubs. Hampton Press. ISBN 978-1-57273-947-5.
- — (2011). Lily Renée, Escape Artist: From Holocaust Survivor to Comic Book Pioneer. Graphic Universe. ISBN 978-0761381143.
- — (2013). Pretty in Ink: North American Women Cartoonists 1896–2013. Fantagraphics. ISBN 978-1-60699-669-0.
- — (2017). Babes in Arms: Women in Comics During the Second World War. Hermes Press. ISBN 978-1-61345-095-6.
- — (2017). A Minyen Yidn: A Bunch of Jews (And Other Stuff). CreateSpace Independent Publishing Platform. ISBN 978-1977744296.
- — (2017). Last Girl Standing. Seattle: Fantagraphics. ISBN 9781683960140.
- — (2020). Flapper Queens: Women Cartoonists of the Jazz Age. Fantagraphics. ISBN 978-1-68396-323-3.
