= Lemming (disambiguation) =

A lemming is a small rodent.

Lemming or Lemmings may also refer to:

== Arts, entertainment, and media ==
=== Music ===
- Lemmings (Bachdenkel album), released in 1973
- Lemmings (Jinn album), released in 2007
- "Lemmings", a song by Blink-182 from their 1997 album Dude Ranch
- "Lemmings", a song by English progressive rock band Van der Graaf Generator from the album Pawn Hearts
- The Lemming (formerly known as Lemming), a Dutch glam rock band

=== Other uses in arts, entertainment, and media ===
- Lemming (film), a 2005 French film
- Lemmings (advertisement), an Apple Computer TV commercial
- Lemmings (video game), a 1991 computer game with numerous sequels
- National Lampoon's Lemmings, a comedy play and album by National Lampoon
- Several characters in the animated television series Camp Lazlo
- Several characters in the animated television series Grizzy & the Lemmings

== Other uses ==
- Eric Lemming (1880–1930), Swedish athlete
