= Edmund Pearson =

American librarian, non-fiction crime writer

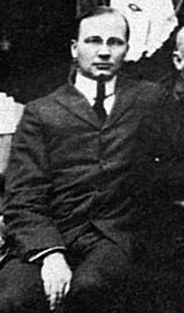
- Born: February 11, 1880; Newburyport
- Died: August 8, 1937
- Education: Harvard University, New York State Library School
- Occupations: Librarian, writer

Edmund Lester Pearson (1880–1937) was an American librarian and writer. He was a writer of the "true crime" literary genre. He is best known for his account of the notorious Lizzie Borden murder case.

== Early life ==
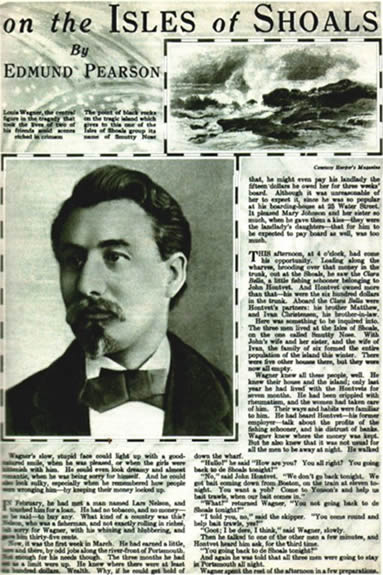
Louis H. F. Wagner at the newspaper, written by Edmund Pearson

Pearson was born in Newburyport, Massachusetts, on February 11, 1880. He graduated from Harvard College in 1902. His first publication was in a school periodical, The Harvard Advocate. In 1904, he graduated with a Bachelor of Library Science from the New York State Library School at Albany, which was previously the Columbia School of Library Service. His thesis was a bibliography of Theodore Roosevelt.

== Career ==
After graduation he first worked as a librarian at the Washington D.C. Public Library, where he met his wife, then Miss Mary Jane Sellers. They did not have any children. In 1906 he moved to the Library of Congress as an assistant in the Copyright Division. In 1908 he became the acting librarian of the Military Information Division of the War Department. From 1906 to 1920 he wrote a weekly column, "The Librarian", for the newspaper the Boston Evening Transcript. The column consisted of humorous essays and stories. The stories often featured the fictional Ezra Beesly Free Public Library of the town of Baxter, as well as other fictional persons and places. In a column from 1907, Pearson printed a paragraph supposedly from an old librarian's almanac. Response from colleagues and friends led him to expand it to a 34-page pamphlet that was published in 1909 as The Old Librarian's Almanack. On the title page the Almanack is described as "a very rare pamphlet first published in New Haven Connecticut in 1773 and now reprinted for the first time." The pamphlet was reviewed seriously by The New York Sun, The Nation, The New York Times, and several other publications, before the hoax was generally known.

In 1927 the magazine Public Libraries called the hoax "a good piece of foolery, bright, clever, with the verisimilitude of authenticity." Even today, a humorous faux-medieval Curse Against Book Stealers from the pamphlet continues to be portrayed as real.

From 1909 to 1914, Pearson lived in Newburyport and wrote several books. He wrote stories based on his childhood in The Believing Years and The Voyage of the Hoppergrass. He published some of his columns from the Librarian in The Library and the Librarian, The Librarian at Play, and The Secret Book. During this time he also served on the board of trustees of the Newburyport Public Library. In 1914, Pearson and his wife moved to New York City and from 1914 to 1927 he worked at the New York Public Library as the Editor of Publications. Starting in 1914, Pearson wrote a series of columns about books for national periodicals such as The Nation (column name: Books and Men), The Dial, the Weekly Review (later called the Independent and Weekly Review) (column names: Books and the News, New Books and Old), and The Outlook (column name: The Book Table). He also wrote book reviews for many publications including The Saturday Review of Literature. He wrote three books about books, Books in Black or Red, Queer Books, and Dime Novels. His work of writing was interrupted briefly during the First World War when he was commissioned as a second lieutenant, but did not serve overseas.

In 1924 he published his best-known work, Studies in Murder, with its signature essay on Lizzie Borden of Fall River. In the years to follow, Pearson published other studies on American criminal cases, including Murder at Smutty Nose and Other Murders and Five Murders although these had limited popularity in comparison to his first landmark work on American crime. He maintained an extensive personal correspondence with the Scottish crime writer, William Roughead, the two writers offering support and encouragement to each other in their chosen field of "matters criminous". In 1934 Pearson went to Hollywood to serve as an uncredited writer for the films Bride of Frankenstein and Werewolf of London.

== Death and legacy ==
Pearson died on August 8, 1937, at the Columbia-Presbyterian Medical Center in New York City of bronchial pneumonia. He was buried in the family plot in the Oak Hill Cemetery, in the city of his birth, Newburyport.

Norman D. Stevens has been active in keeping alive the writings of Edmond Pearson by collecting a portion of the Librarian column in a book of the same name. Stevens is the director of the Molesworth Institute which presents the Edmund Lester Pearson Library Humor Award which has rewarded and encouraged a new generation of library humorists.

Professor Jack Matthews, called Pearson "a writer of acknowledged distinction" and "a bibliophile in the grand old manner." He also remarks that Pearson was "ahead of his time in his interest in popular culture and popular fiction." More than this, Matthews says that Pearson "had wit, he knew things, he cared about the world, and he understood language."

In 2008, the Library of America selected Pearson's story "The "Hell Benders" or The Story of a Wayside Tavern"” for inclusion in its two-century retrospective of American True Crime.

== Publications ==
Books written by Pearson

- The Old Librarian's Almanack (1909)
- The Library and the Librarian (1910)
- The Librarian at Play (1911)
- The Believing Years (1912) (autobiography)
- The Voyage of the Hoppergrass (1913) (autobiography)
- The Secret Book (1914)
- Theodore Roosevelt (1920)
- Books in Black or Red (1923)
- Studies in Murder (1924)
- Murder at Smutty Nose and Other Murders (1926)
- Five Murders, with a Final Note on the Borden Case (1928)
- Queer Books (1928)
- Dime novels; or, Following an Old Trail in Popular Literature (1929)
- Instigation of the Devil (1930)
- More Studies in Murder (1936)
- Trial of Lizzie Borden, edited, with a History of the Case (1937)
- Masterpieces of Murder (1963)
- Murders that Baffled the Experts (1967)
- The Adventure of the Lost Manuscripts & One Other (1974)
- The Librarian: Selections from the Column of That Name (1976)

Books edited by Pearson

- Frankenstein: or the Modern Prometheus. by Shelley, Mary Wollstonecraft. Printed with an introduction by Edmund Lester Pearson. New York, Limited Editions Club, 1934.
- The Autobiography of a Criminal. by Tufts, Henry. Edited by Edmund Lester Pearson. New York, Duffield and Company, 1930.
