= Joan Hilty =

American cartoonist, educator, and comic book editor (born 1966)

- Born: December 27, 1966 (age 59) Lexington, Kentucky
- Areas: Cartoonist, Editor
- Notable works: Bitter Girl
- Awards: Best Graphic Story, International Horror Guild Award, Eisner Award, Harvey Award, Glyph Comics Award, Best American Comics 2013

Joan Hilty (born December 27, 1966) is an American cartoonist, educator, and comic book editor. She was a Senior Editor for mainstream publisher DC Comics and currently works for Nickelodeon as Editorial Director for graphic novels, comics, and legacy properties. Hilty works independently as both a writer-artist and editor.

== Early life and education ==
Hilty was born in Lexington, Kentucky, but grew up in Larkspur, California, just north of San Francisco. At the age of 11, she took cartooning classes with Trina Robbins at College of Marin. Hilty came out as a lesbian in high school.

Hilty received a B.A. in Visual Arts from Brown University in 1989, as well as took classes on the side at Rhode Island School of Design. After college, she returned to the Bay Area, where she received support from Trina Robbins, Caryn Leschen, Roxxie, Angela Bocage, and Robert Triptow. Hilty was subsequently published in an issue of Wimmen's Comix. While in San Francisco, Hilty also published in small title presses Rip Off Press and Fantagraphics Books. In 1992 she was a regular feature in The Advocate (LGBT magazine), and created the characters Immola and the Luna Legion, the first team of lesbian superheroes, appearing in Oh..., a female-oriented comics anthology. She produced the syndicated strip Bitter Girl, about lesbian dating, from 2001 to 2012; the comic can be found on her website.

== Career ==
Hilty began as a freelance illustrator at Studio Kaibito, from 1990 until 2006, creating illustrations and editorial/essay comics. In 1995, she began as an Editor at DC Comics and then was promoted to Senior Editor in 2008. As an editor, Hilty has worked with writers and cartoonists such as Neil Gaiman, G. Willow Wilson, Greg Rucka, Gene Luen Yang, Jim Ottaviani, and Kevin Baker.

Hilty began with the company's mature-readers Vertigo imprint, for which she won the 1999 International Horror Guild Award for the Vertigo anthology Flinch. She switched to editing superhero titles in 2000, established the Johnny DC imprint for young readers in 2004, and in 2008 began curating original graphic novels for Vertigo.

In 2011, she co-founded 5E, a New-York-based organization of independent editors. The following year she co-founded Pageturner, a "boutique book agency and content producer specializing in graphic novels, illustrated content and comics-related transmedia". In 2016, she became Comics and Magazine Editor for Nickelodeon, and was also an Editorial Consultant at Studio Kaibito.

Hilty continues to work on independent comic book projects with a variety of publishers, including The Curie Society (MIT Press) and Blue Man World.

She was a member of the faculty for Maryland Institute College of Art (MICA) in Baltimore from January 2012 through January 2016, and is a current professor at the School of Visual Arts (SVA) in New York City.

Hilty is on the programming committee for Miami Book Fair International and Brooklyn Book Festival. She has also participated in panels in multiple industry conferences, such as Lanka Comic Con, The Center for Fiction, New York Comic Con, and the Queers & Comics Conference.

Her art has been exhibited at the New Museum in New York City, and the Maryland Institute College of Art in Baltimore.

== Personal life ==
Hilty is a lesbian. In 1999, Hilty began a relationship with Nancy Goldstein and they married in 2004 in the state of Massachusetts.

== Awards ==
- Glyph Comics Award
- International Horror Guild Award
- Harvey Award, 2011, Cuba, My Revolution
- Best American Comics, 2013
