= California Girl =

"California Girls" is a song by the Beach Boys.

California Girl(s) may also refer to:

== Music ==
- "California Girls", 2006 song by Gretchen Wilson
- "California Gurls", 2010 song by Katy Perry
- "California Girl", a 1976 song by Chilliwack
- "California Girl", a 1970 song by Eddie Floyd
- California Girl, a 2002 album by Nancy Sinatra
- "California Girls", a 2008 song by the Magnetic Fields from Distortion
- "California Girl", a 2009 song by Cheap Trick from The Latest
- California Girls, a 2016 mixtape by Lil Peep, re-released in 2021

== Other ==
- California Girls (comic), a 1987 comic book by Trina Robbins
- California Girls (film), a 1985 American film starring Robby Benson
- California Girl, a 2004 novel by T. Jefferson Parker
- KKSF§California Girls, a 1971 provocative radio show
