= Michele Wrightson =

American comic book artist

- Born: Michele Robinson; 1941
- Died: May 30, 2015 (aged 73) Saugerties, New York, US
- Areas: Cartoonist, Colourist
- Pseudonym: Michele Brand
- Notable works: It Ain't Me, Babe; Wimmen's Comix
- Spouses: Roger Brand (m. mid-1960s, div. c. 1974); Bernie Wrightson (m. c. 1976, div.)

Michele Wrightson, also known as Michele Brand (1941–2015), was an American artist who worked in the comic book industry. She started out as an underground comix cartoonist. Later, she made her name as a colorist. She was a key contributor to the first all-female underground comic, It Ain't Me, Babe, as well as its follow-up series, Wimmen's Comix.

== Biography ==
Michele Robinson grew up in New Orleans, where her parents were on the faculty at Tulane University.

In 1966, she and husband Roger Brand moved from Oakland, California, to New York City, specifically to break into the comics business. Roger Brand began working for Wally Wood and Bill Pearson on witzend and other projects. Michele assisted Gil Kane on His Name is Savage #1 (Adventure House Press, 1968). By the late 1960s the couple were back in the San Francisco Bay Area.

Michele's first comics credit was in the groundbreaking all female one-shot It Ain't Me, Babe (Last Gasp, 1970), with the story "Tirade Funnies." She later became a contributor to the follow-up series Wimmen's Comix, as well as anthologies like Arcade. She and her husband were part of the group of cartoonists who formed the United Cartoon Workers of America, an informal union designed to safeguard creators' rights.

In c. 1974, during the downturn of the underground comix market, she moved to New York City and began working in the mainstream comics industry, mostly as a colorist. One of her last (proto-)underground contributions was to Flo Steinberg's Big Apple Comix, published in 1975. She worked for Marvel Comics (doing color separations for Marvel UK) and Warren Publishing from 1974–1975, and Heavy Metal in 1977, and then took time off to marry Bernie Wrightson and raise their sons.

She returned to comics coloring in the mid-1980s, working for Marvel, Eclipse Comics, and DC Comics for the balance of that decade. She often worked on projects illustrated by Bernie Wrightson, including Heavy Metal #65–70 (HM Communications, Inc., 1977), Stephen King's Creepshow (Plume/Penguin Group, 1982), and The Weird (DC Comics, 1988). She colored many books published by the DC imprint Milestone Media during its run (1993–1997), chiefly Blood Syndicate.

She had no significant comics credits after 1997.

== Personal life ==
She and Roger Brand lived in San Francisco in the late 1960s/early 1970s, at one point living across the street from fellow underground cartoonist Larry Todd.

She and Brand divorced circa 1974. She married Bernie Wrightson some time later; together they had two sons, named John and Jeffrey. She and Wrightson had been divorced for some time before her death.

== Bibliography ==
As artist:

- It Ain't Me, Babe (Last Gasp, 1970) — "Monday" and "Tirade Funnies"
- Wimmen's Comix #1 (Last Gasp, Nov. 1972) — ""You Are What You Know"
- Wimmen's Comix #2 (Last Gasp, 1973) — "There I Was..."
- Nickel Library (Eric Fromm, 1973) — one-page homage to EC Comics
- (with writer Dennis O'Neil) Big Apple Comix (Big Apple Productions, 1975) — art for the foreword
- (with Mary Skrenes) Wimmen's Comix #6 (Last Gasp, Dec. 1975) — "Victoria the Woodhull"
- Arcade: The Comics Revue #5 (Print Mint, Spring 1976) — "A Dream Is a Wish Your Heart Makes"
- Arcade: The Comics Revue #7 (Print Mint, Fall 1976) — "Captive Bride Of The Shark Men / Tales From The Aquarium / Victoria Woodhull, The Continuing Saga / Alligator Dream"
- (with writer Bill Mantlo, penciler Joe Staton, and co-inker Sonny Trinidad) Deadly Hands of Kung Fu #32 (Marvel, Jan. 1977) — "The Tiger-Sons Must Die!"
