= California Girls (comic) =

American comic book series

- The cover to California Girls #2, art by Trina Robbins.

Publication information
- Publisher: Eclipse Comics
- Schedule: Monthly #1–6; Bimonthly #7–8
- Format: Ongoing series
- Publication date: June 1987 – May 1988
- No. of issues: 8
- Main character(s): Max; Mo; Roxanne; Lulu; Laverne

Creative team
- Created by: Trina Robbins
- Written by: Trina Robbins
- Artist(s): Trina Robbins; Joshua Quagmire (#4 & #6); Carol Lay (#5); Barb Rausch (#6–8)
- Letterer: L. Lois Buhalis
- Colorist: Trina Robbins
- Editor: Cat Yronwoode

California Girls is a creator-owned American comedy-romance comic series created by Trina Robbins. Published by Eclipse Comics between 1987 and 1988, the series chronicled the adventures of identical twin high school students Max and Mo in the fictional Californian town of Hollyhock. It was one of the few comics aimed at a primarily female audience published at the time.

== Creation ==
Cartoonist Trina Robbins had created the similar Misty for Marvel Comics' Star Comics imprint in 1985. While the title developed a core following and drew good notices it was cancelled after six issues. Eclipse editor-in-chief Cat Yronwoode, who had worked with Robbins on the non-fiction history Women and the Comics, reasoned that sales that were poor by Marvel's standards would be excellent for Eclipse, and engaged Robbins to make a similar comic. Both felt there was a gap in the market for young female readers. Like Misty, California Girls would feature reader-designed outfits and paper dolls, and used a 40-page format compared to the 32 pages of most monthly titles. Typically issues would contain three short stories (with two usually revolving around Max and Mo, with the third spotlighting one of the supporting characters), paper dolls, pin-ups and a Designer of the Month feature where one reader would be profiled. While the comic would feature black and white interiors, the paper dolls would be in airbrushed colour on the magazine's centre pages.

== Publishing history ==
The first issue of the monthly series was dated June 1987; in support of the title Robbins wrote letters to retailers encouraging them to stock the book and target girls brought into stores by male family members or friends, who she felt found superhero comics boring. Each issue spotlighted a reader as 'Designer of the Month'; Ken Steacy submitted a hat design for the sixth issue - which was humorously mocked by the characters for its hideous appearance.

From #7 the title switched to a bi-monthly schedule and dropped to 32 pages, something Robbins attributed to her workload, while in 1988 Heidi MacDonald reported that California Girls had been optioned by "a major animation studio". Editor Letitia Glozer claimed the title received more fan mail than nearly all of Eclipse's other comics. However, from #8 the title was to go quarterly due to low sales. The final issue featured contributions from Mario Hernandez.

An issue compiling the paper dolls from the series was planned either as a one-shot spin-off called California Girls Paper Dolls or as California Girls #9 but was never published. Despite Eclipse mailing copies of California Girls to a thousand readers from Misty's mailing list in a promotional push no further issues of the title would be produced. Robbins would blame the title's demise on comic stores being reluctant to carry the book.

Max and Mo made one final appearance in a cameo in Eclipse's crossover mini-series Total Eclipse, with their single panel drawn by Robbins and again featuring reader-submitted outfit designs. In 1993, Robbins donated the mail she received for the title along with other material to the Billy Ireland Cartoon Library & Museum at the Ohio State University. All eight issues of California Girls were collected by San Francisco publisher CBG in 2009, and on June 14 Robbins signed copies of the book at the Cartoon Art Museum.

== Plot ==
Identical twins and best friends Mo and Max Muldoon attend Hollyhock High School in California. The pair live with their 'Grammy' and her cat Smidgin, and their parents are never mentioned. The pair often dress in matching outfits, and can only be told apart due to Max parting her hair on the right, and Mo parting it on the left. A running gag is that those unfamiliar with the girls are unable to tell them apart, while their friends never have any trouble. They have a number of largely wholesome adventures, including raising funds to buy prom dresses, dating boys, fund-raising for charity and school drama productions, winning a beauty contest, holidaying in Hawaii, and learning about dolphin protection.

They become minor celebrities in the town after appearing in a commercial for Twicenice gum, even appearing in their own comic.

== Characters ==
- Mo: Mo Muldoon is the shyer of twins, and more lovelorn than her sister - she has a crush on Lulu's brother Raoul and Canadian student Gene Lombard She is a fan of silent film star Jean Lombard and reading science fiction novels.
- Max: Maxine Muldoon is a relentless chatterbox, and a fan of Cyndi Lauper and Sean Penn.
- Laverne: a pampered rich girl in the twins' class whose snobby attitude often places her as an antagonist to Mo and Max. She likes Duran Duran, and her father is a wealthy film producer at Tantamount Pictures. While often jealous of the twins' popularity, she does occasionally spend her money on others, buying Roxanne a $300 dress for the latter's birthday and throwing the other girls a party when Mo and Max are away in Hawaii.
- Roxanne: a classmate who works as a waitress at the Mom's Home Cooking diner getting fired for giving Laverne intentionally poor service, and then at fashion store Tina's Togs
- Lulu: full name Luisa Maria Conchita Mendoza; a friend of the twins who fronts a rock group called Crazy Babyz, with her four brothers as the other members.

== Collected editions ==
Title	ISBN	Release date	Issues
California Girls		June 2009	California Girls #1-8

== Reception ==
Reviewing the first issue for Amazing Heroes, Gerard Jones acknowledged he wasn't in the book's target audience but nevertheless recommended the book and praised Robbins' art, though he feared the series was unlikely to reach its hoped-for readers via Eclipse's direct market model. He also noted the price jump from Marvel's 75¢ to Eclipse's $2.00 was a large one for young buyers. Heidi MacDonald noted the paradoxical contrast of the light-hearted California Girls with Robbins' outspoken nature. When questioned whether Mo and Max's frothy adventures and perfect figures clashed with her feminist ideals, Robbins responded "young women are into 'we can be powerful and cute'".
