= Molesworth Institute =

Fictional organization

Coordinates: 41.805646°N 72.229872°W

The Molesworth Institute is a fictional organization started in 1956 with the aim of promoting library humour. It is a combination of real librarians and fictitious people, mostly literary characters. The founder and longtime director, Norman D. Stevens, has published a great many humorous articles about Library science under his title from the organization, and the institute has been mentioned in major publications in this field of study.

== History ==
The Molesworth Institute was founded by Norman D. Stevens and Francis A.T. Johns who were friends and fellow students attending Rutgers University's library science program. In 1956, they made up the Molesworth Institution in their course paper. The organization's namesake is Nigel Molesworth, a cheeky youngster in the 1954 book Down with Skool! A Guide to School Life for Tiny Pupils and their Parents written by Geoffrey Willans. The fictional organization had several employees named after people affiliated with St. Custard's, the prep school in the novel, such as Timothy Peason. Some of the employees' names were inspired by other sources: Cecily Cardew is a young lady in the Oscar Wilde play The Importance of Being Earnest. Stevens wrote an article about Molesworth Institute that appeared in 1963 in the ALA Bulletin, the first time he had written a published article about the organization.

Although the employees were fictitious, nearly every one of the institute's fellows were actual people. Stevens anointed himself the director of the institute and added about 80 "Fellows of the Institute" whose members were his wife, Nora, his colleagues, library luminaries and academics. The June 1989 and April 1991 publications of the Wilson Library Bulletin published lists of the organization's employees and fellows. Stevens was recorded as executive director, while Francis Johns, his classmate at Rutgers, was recorded as a senior fellow. Other fellows included in the list were the artist Jackie Urbanovic and the librarians Michael Gorman, Sanford Berman, and Charles Curran. The late librarian Edmund Pearson became a fellow in 1991, and the librarian Will Manley was added that year. In 1992, Manley authored the book Unsolicited Advice, in which he included a sham question and answer section with a student who wanted him to answer what he thought "the greatest professional honor that a librarian can aspire to". Manley replied, "When I get a resume from a job-seeker the first thing I do is look for membership in the Molesworth Institute — there is no greater honor in our profession." Josiah Carberry, a fictitious Brown University professor, was included as a fellow in 1992.

In 2003, the Swedish librarian Bengt Hjelmqvist became a centenarian. Stevens had met Hjelmqvist when Stevens and his wife had traveled to Sweden. Stevens called the librarian "by far, the most distinguished of all" the international fellows of the institute. In response Hjelmqvist wrote a poem titled "The Molesworth Institute Fellow's War Cry" in which he counseled that "our enemies are those who have no sense at all for jokes and rackets. ... A mirror is our weapon, our noble attribute. In it our enemies will see themselves."

Stevens liked to play practical jokes by getting himself and the Molesworth Institution's fictitious employees such as Nigel Molesworth and Timothy Peason be mentioned in typical reference books such as American Library Directory, Who's Who in Library and Information Services, Directory of Library and Information Professionals, and A Biographical Directory of Libraries in the United States and Canada. He felt that having fake entries in the books would make them "somehow become endowed with an air of reality". The Library Journal published an article saying that Molesworth Institute employee Nouleigh Rhee Furbished had joined the organization, while College & Research Libraries News published an article about the new employee Ted E. Behr. Steven wrote a Wikipedia article about the Molesworth Institute, which led Wikipedia editors to challenge portions of the material, and modified UCLA Library Reference Department's wiki to include Timothy Peason, the fake librarian.

Stevens aggressively called attention to his humor by writing around 60 articles where he gave his title as director of the fictitious organization. The articles have been published in Italy, Brazil, France, England, Sweden. His most recent Molesworth article, "The First Fully Electronic Library", appeared in the 2006 issue of the journal, College & Research Libraries. In April 2011, Steves selected Katie Herzog, a librarian at Whittier Public Library in Whittier, California, as the organization's director.

Stevens' book Archives of Library Research from the Molesworth Institute has been reviewed in the Australian Academic & Research Libraries (AARL), the Canadian Library Journal, The Journal of Academic Librarianship, and the Herald of Library Science.

Although Stevens initially intended to be the sole director of the institute, he changed his mind and specified that Chelsea Flower, his granddaughter, would be the Director Designate. For over four decades, the organization had the same address as Stevens' Storrs, Connecticut, house.
