= Bachdenkel =

English rock group

- Origin: Birmingham, England
- Genres: Psychedelic rock, progressive rock
- Years active: 1968–1977
- Labels: Philips, The Initial Recording Company, Ork
- Past members: Colin Swinburne; Peter Kimberley; Terry Hyland; Dave Bradley; Ron Lee; Brian Smith; Karel Beer
- Website: www.anythingmatters.com/bachdenkel

Bachdenkel were an English rock group which came to life in and around the King's Heath area of Birmingham in the late 1960s, evolving out of a combo called U No Who, whose members were Colin Swinburne (1948–2021), Peter Kimberley, Terry Hyland, Dave Bradley and Ron Lee.

Bachdenkel was one of the seminal bands on the Birmingham scene during the late 1960s, which saw the development of psychedelic culture and electric rock music.

In 1968 Brian Smith replaced Ron Lee on drums and when Dave Bradley exited the group they became a three piece with Peter Kimberley on a six-string Fender bass. They had close links with the Birmingham Arts Lab, a venue for experimental artists of all types, and often performed with a full psychedelic light show.

Following a publicity campaign which included subverting a large department store's marketing logo and a photo shoot with a piano in a local fountain, they left the country. They subsequently found themselves in Paris, long the refuge of revolutionary artists and artistic revolutionaries. After the events of May 1968, France was ready for new ideas and new music and English rock bands were much in vogue at the time.

An article about the group was published in IT Magazine, issue 64, 1969.

Bachdenkel settled in France and over the next decade produced two albums: Lemmings in 1970 (released in 1973) and Stalingrad in 1977. At times in their career, they shared the billing with Led Zeppelin and Black Sabbath amongst others and provided the music for a modern ballet.

== Band line-up ==
- Colin Swinburne - lead guitar, vocals
- Peter Kimberley - bass guitar, vocals
- Terry Hyland - vocals (U No Who)
- Dave Bradley - bass
- Ron Lee - drums
- Brian Smith - drums, vocals
- Karel Beer - twelve-string guitar

== Discography ==
- Lemmings (1973)
- Stalingrad (1977)
- Rise and Fall (2022 3-CD anthology on Grapefruit/Cherry Red Records)
