= Suzy Varty =

British comics artist, writer, and editor

- Born: Gateshead, Newcastle upon Tyne, England
- Areas: Cartoonist, Writer, Penciller, Artist, Inker, Editor, Letterer, Colourist
- Notable works: Heröine, Mama! dramas, Nelson

Suzy Varty is a noted British comics artist, writer, and editor. In the late 1970s, she compiled, contributed to and edited Heröine, the first anthology of comics by women to be published in the U.K. Throughout the 70s, she was part of the Birmingham Arts Lab, and she has participated in the Underground Comix and Wimmen's Comix movements in the U.S. Varty remains active in the British Comics scene, frequently appearing at such conventions as Thought Bubble Comic Arts Festival in Leeds and the Canny Comic Con in Newcastle.

== Career ==
Suzy Varty's work has appeared alongside the work of such renowned underground comix creators as Trina Robbins, Phoebe Gloeckner, and Hunt Emerson.

Varty's artistic career began as she found herself part of the Birmingham Arts Lab, an alternative arts center created in 1968. Varty's first comic was published in the Arts Lab's Street Comix in 1976.

Varty was also a contributor to and editor of the 1978 underground comic book Heröine, the first all-female comics anthology published in Britain. A feminist comic that gained praise for going against beliefs of what was considered "feminine," Heröine was praised for challenging social stereotypes by being a form of anarchy against the otherwise strict depictions of political standpoints in Britain. After Heröine was published, the Birmingham Women's Liberation Movement conference praised the work for its contribution to feminist art. As the first anthology of comics by women to be published in the U.K., Heröine is credited with opening doors for the creation of the British Women's Comic Collective in 1991.

While in Birmingham Varty published a fanzine during 1979 along with fellow artists Connie Klassmen and Syd Freake. The fanzine was called Brass Lip and contained interviews with the bands Kleenex, The Mekons, Poison Girls, and The Raincoats. The zine focused on political narratives and feminist culture; another important focal point of the zine was the topic of sexism in the punk/rock industry. Brass Lip was a representation of feminist ideologies that were forming in the late 1960s and early 1970s.

In 2003, Varty discussed the lasting appeal of Wonder Woman on BBC Four, alongside comics expert Paul Gravett. In 2014, she was one of the judges for the British Comic Awards.

Varty has garnered international success as well, with her comics being published in Finland, England, and America.

== Selected bibliography ==
- Street Comix (Birmingham Arts Lab Press 1976)—contributor
- Heröine (Birmingham Arts Lab Press 1978)—contributor, editor
- Mama! dramas (Educomics 1978)—contributor
- The Comic Book of First Love (Penguin Books 1990)—contributor
- The Facts of Life (Penguin Books 1990)—contributor
- Wimmin's Comix (aka Wimmen's Comix) #17 (Rip Off Press 1992)—contributor
- My Story (BBC Raw 2008)—contributor
- Nelson (Blank Slate Books 2011)—contributor
