= Good Girls (comics) =

Publication information
- Publisher: Fantagraphics; Rip Off Press
- Schedule: Irregular
- Publication date: April 1987 - June 1991
- No. of issues: 6

Creative team
- Created by: Carol Lay
- Written by: Carol Lay
- Artist: Carol Lay
- Letterer: Carol Lay

Collected editions
- Goodnight, Irene: ISBN 0-86719-659-9

Good Girls is a 1987–1991 six-issue comic book limited series. It was created by Carol Lay and published by Fantagraphics and then Rip Off Press. The series parodies romance comics.

== History ==
The comic book started with another strip, "Ms Lonelyhearts", which progressively disappeared. The second featured Irene Van de Kamp, an heiress who grew up in an African tribe who puts face markings and a disk in her lower lip. She meets an assortment of weird characters while trying to find romance and avoid people who are only after her money. Carol Lay gives an account of how the character started in her preface to the collection. It is a combination of a picture of three Ubangi women in Hustler magazine, DC romance comic Heart Throbs and Western Publishing Donald Duck and Uncle Scrooge comics that prompted her to create the character. She used her as filler in Good Girls #1 but eventually Irene took over. The influence of Tarzan is also evident in the origin of the character.

== Reception ==
In Amazing Heroes #145 (July 15, 1988), Alan Moore gave a list of ten recommendations for current comics and about "Good Girls" he said:

"GOOD GIRLS is another one that I shall certainly be checking out. I don't know why I find Carol Lay's stuff so wonderful and fascinating, but there's something about it that really tickles me. It might just be the quirky sensibilities of the stories, or the fact that her style is so reminiscent of traditional romance comics in places that the oddness of it looks all the more appealing in context. There's something about it which I find very, very charming".

The sixth issue contained letters of appreciation by Scott McCloud and Peter Bagge.

Jaime Hernandez has stated: "I've been a fan of Carol Lay's ever since The Pep Girls, and Irene has always been one of my favorite characters".

== Collected editions ==
A collection of the strips called Goodnight, Irene: The Collected Stories of Irene Van De Kamp was published in June 2007 by Last Gasp (ISBN 0867196599) with two new stories.
