= Birmingham Arts Lab =

Arts centre in Birmingham, England

Coordinates: 52.491°N 1.900°W

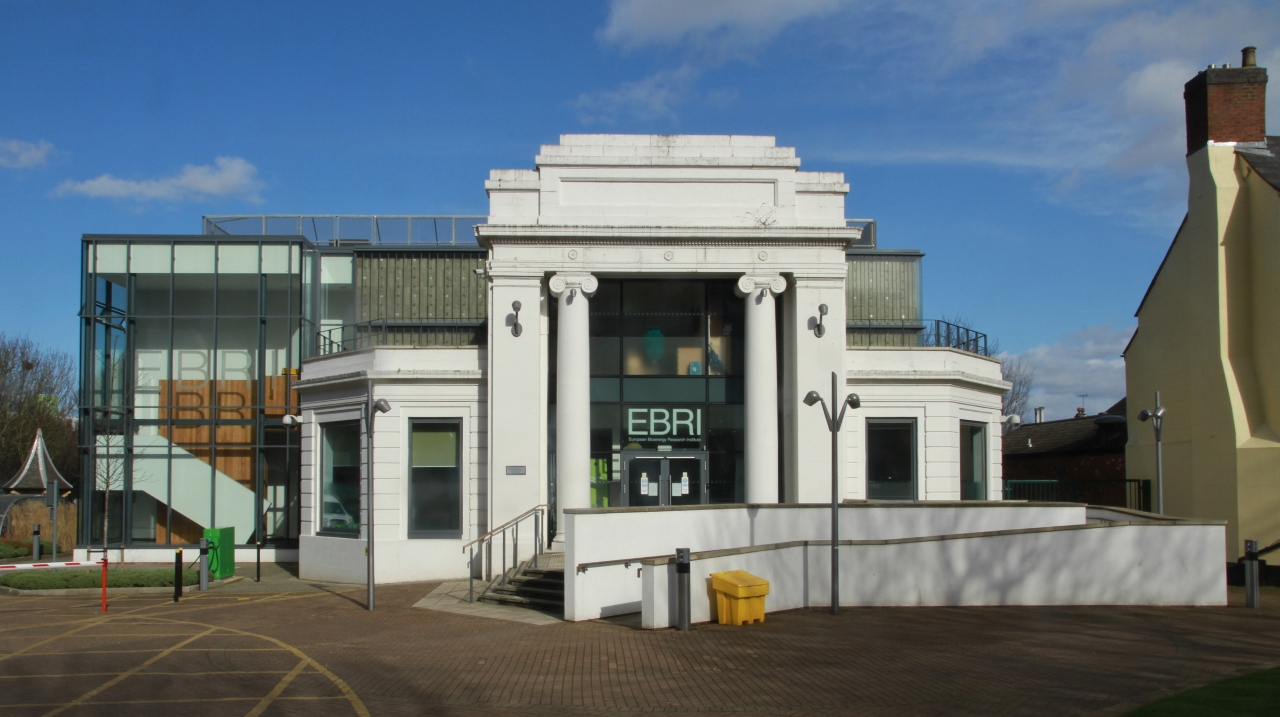
The front of the former Delicia Cinema, and later the Aston University Centre for the Arts. 12 Gosta Green, Birmingham, which Birmingham Arts Lab turned into the Triangle Arts Centre

The Birmingham Arts Laboratory or Arts Lab was an experimental arts centre and artist collective based in Birmingham, England from 1968 to 1982 – an "arts and performance space dedicated to radical research into art and creativity". Loosely organised and biased towards the obscure and avant-garde, it was described by The Guardian in 1997 as "one of the emblematic institutions of the 1960s".

The Arts Lab was originally based in a run-down youth centre run by The Birmingham Settlement on Tower Street in Newtown on the northern edge of Birmingham City Centre, and was accessible from the street only via a metal fire escape. It moved to a former brewery on Holt Street in Gosta Green in 1977, before financial problems and pressure from the arts establishment forced it to amalgamate with and take over Aston University's Centre for the Arts on Gosta Green to form the more conventional Triangle Arts Centre in 1982.

The Birmingham Arts Lab had a wide influence across numerous art forms. Figures involved with the Arts Lab, often early in their careers, included cartoonists Hunt Emerson, Edward Barker, Kevin O'Neill, Bryan Talbot, Steve Bell and Suzy Varty; playwrights David Edgar and David Hare; film director Mike Figgis; writer and poet Gareth Owen; comedian and performance artist John Dowie; photographer and journalist Derek Bishton; the psychedelic group Bachdenkel; novelist Jim Crace; singer Ruby Turner, film maker and photographer Pogus Caesar and composer and sonic artist Trevor Wishart.

== History ==
=== Origins ===
The genesis of the Birmingham Arts Laboratory can be traced to a meeting on 8 September 1968, of five figures (Mark Williams, Fred Smith, Dave Cassidy, Tony Jones and Bob Sheldon) from the Midlands Arts Centre, who had been promoting avant garde music performances at the centre's outdoor auditorium and had been involved in Mike Leigh's experiments in improvised theatre, but had become frustrated at what they saw as the bureaucracy and obstructionism of the centre's management. The group resolved to start a breakaway venue to "provide a centre for experimenting in the Arts; be a community of creative people, self-aware and self-supporting; participate creatively in the life of the City; and present work of both its members and visiting groups and individuals"

There followed five months of fund-raising events around the city called Strange Days and featuring bands such as Fleetwood Mac, Colosseum and DJ John Peel (whose fundraising efforts saw him became the Arts Lab's first life member), during which a local charity offered the group the use of a first floor room in its Newtown Youth Centre as a venue. The Arts Lab opened in January 1969, initially only at weekends.

Terry Grimley, later arts correspondent of the Birmingham Post, recalled "When I first found my way to the Arts Lab, it did not resemble an arts centre so much as a night club with a rather different ambience to other places in town. Nothing happened except at weekends, and not much happened then either, except that music was played, coloured lights were projected and people ate vegetables and brown rice and drank instant coffee."

=== Tower Street ===
The Arts Lab was open full-time from April 1969. Initially occupying only a single room on the top floor of the building but quickly expanding to occupy the whole first floor (with the gymnasium becoming the main theatre and performance space), and eventually to occupy the entire building with the ground floor providing artist studios. Within its first year it established a cinema programme organised by Tony Jones and Pete Walsh, and theatre programme organised by Pete Stark, and two experimental arts festivals – Cybervironment Plus organised by Simon Chapman and Gathering Number Oneorganised by Pete Stark. Funding from the Arts Council from 1971 secured its future and saw it begin to employ those working there.

The Arts Lab was initially run along the lines of a club for members and guests. Although it never had a drinks licence (due to constant friction with the local licensing authorities) it had a coffee bar, beneath which was a void between the floors in which several members intermittently lived. Jim Crace later recalled that "it was no surprise to discover a badly-smelling playwright or drink-wrecked mime artist emerging between your legs from a priest hole below the floorboards".

The Arts Lab started with no formal organisation, but with Peter Stark as unofficial administrator. Stark left in 1970 and was replaced by Simon Chapman, who left in 1972 to become the Director of the Ikon Gallery and was replaced by Ted Little. Little was to be artistic director through to 1982, apart from a two-year spell as head of the Institute of Contemporary Arts in London, during which he transformed it "from a club for the self-absorbed of Kensington to a roaring popular venue" and paved the way for its important role in the early years of British punk.

=== Holt Street ===
The Arts Lab's earlier chaotic, co-operative organisation was increasingly challenged by funders from 1975 onwards, with a formal Board of Management being established in 1976. August 1977 saw the Arts Lab move completely from Tower Street to new, much larger premises in a former brewery on the campus of Aston University, with a bookshop, studios and exhibition spaces. Shortage of funds meant that not all of the planned facilities were finished, however, and the new more orderly surroundings were felt by some to have compromised the Arts Lab's uniquely liberating culture.

The first signs of problems became apparent in 1980 when two members of the music staff were made redundant and Ted Little left to pursue freelance work. The Arts Lab's programme began to focus increasingly on film to the exclusion of other media. In 1982 West Midlands Arts sponsored a move to combine the Arts Lab with Aston University's own Centre for the Arts (with the resultant demise of the Centre for the Arts, which had previously been a popular, thriving, live performance arts venue) as a venue focussing primarily on cinema and photography, and in 1983 the Arts Lab's premises reopened as a new Arts Centre called the Triangle Media and Arts Centre. Funding for this was removed in 1987, however, and the cinema finally closed in 1994.

== Activities and influence ==
=== Theatre and performance ===
The Arts Lab's theatre programme was controversial from its start in 1969, with a nude open-air performance on the Arts Lab's roof by the theatre company Sweetness and Light attracting headlines in the Birmingham Post. By 1971 there was a regular programme of visiting theatre companies - mainly radical performance art groups such as the People Show, Pip Simmons Theatre Group and John Bull Puncture Repair Kit - together with performances by the Arts Lab's own theatre company Zoo.

A regular Theatre Workshop was established from 1973, and the following years saw a series of plays written specifically for the Arts Lab including John Dowie's Stillsmith, Gareth Owen's Confession of Jon-Jak Crusoe and his rock operetta Rupert, Bruce Lacey and Jill Bruce's Stella Superstar and Her Amazing Intergalactic Adventures and most notably David Edgar's Summer Sports, later revived as Blood Sports and still widely performed.

Between 1972 and 1976 the Performance Group - based at the Arts Lab but touring internationally - produced a range of shows that combined dance, film, text, poetry, electronics and ambient music; declaring "Total Theatre, Mixed or Multimedia, Compound Theatre are all terms we use in this connection", and from 1976 the Writers' Theatre Company provided an outlet for the professional production of work by young local writers. The Arts Lab was also notable as a comedy venue, with Stewart Lee crediting Victoria Wood and John Dowie's work at the Arts Lab as being one of the earliest roots of the later alternative comedy movement. Janice Connolly, who later became comedy character Mrs Barbara Nice, performed at Tower Street in a piece directed by John Dowie from a Hunt Emerson cartoon "Dog Man".

=== Cinema ===
The Arts Lab's cinema programme was established by Tony Jones – the first film shown being Medium Cool by Haskell Wexler, which had never before seen in the UK – and it continued after the programmes in most other media went into decline from 1980 onwards. The reputation of the Arts Lab's Tower Street venue as "the world's most uncomfortable cinema, the silence only broken by the accompaniment of some thrasher on the piano and the timpani of scurrying rats" was partly explained by the fact that the seating had been bought second-hand from a local cinema. In addition to its regular programme the Arts Lab held an annual Film Festival from 1972, focussing on particular themes including film makers such as Kenneth Anger, Josef von Sternberg or F. W. Murnau, or 1976's focus on Polish Cinema. Jones left the Arts Lab in 1978 to join the Cambridge Film Theatre.

=== Music ===
The Arts Lab's music programme was defiantly aimed at "presenting contemporary music in Birmingham on a regular basis, regardless of the support it may or may not receive", starting off with a then-unusual all-Bartók concert by the Lindsay String Quartet. 1970 saw the foundation of the Arts Lab Sound Workshop by Jolyon Laycock, which produced a series of experimental sound performances throughout the 1970s involving improvisation, electronic music, amplification effects and liquid light shows, in regular collaboration with artists such as Cornelius Cardew, David Panton, Trevor Wishart and various ensembles associated with the University of Birmingham, often touring through Europe and North America. Notable premieres included Wishart's Menagerie and Audio Movies.

The Arts Lab also developed a reputation as a centre of improvised rock, running from the psychedelia of Bachdenkel in the late 1960s, through the Arts Lab's own Amphioxus jazz-rock ensemble of the mid-seventies, to later collaborative performances at Birmingham Museum & Art Gallery.

=== Art, comics and poster art ===
The Arts Lab had a printing operation from its establishment in 1969, set up by Bryan Brown and Simon Chapman whose work was influenced by the psychedelic imagery of the West Coast of America. It initially used silkscreen printing to produce posters for Arts Lab events, and raising funds by producing posters for local Student Unions and music promoters. The posters operation was later taken over by Bob Linney and Ken Meharg for the Arts Lab – emphasising simultaneous colour contrasts and the dynamic integration of hand-painted text with manipulated photographic imagery – were especially notable, being the subject of an international touring exhibition by the British Council between 1981 and 1985, and an exhibition by Birmingham Museum & Art Gallery in 1998. They moved to London and John Angus took over for a year before moving to Lancaster. Ernie Hudson was particularly renown for his revolutionary multiple colour silk screen prints produced during this time. Although few posters remain, those that do are archived in Birmingham Museum and Art gallery.

In 1970 the Arts Lab obtained an offset litho press on loan from a local cash and carry operation (in return for printing the company's price list for free) and in 1972 Ernie Hudson bought a secondhand press of its own. Initially intended to print flyers and price lists the purchase of its own press meant the offset operation was dedicated to the manufacture of the Lab's cinema programme and art related projects. The take-over of the printing operation by Hunt Emerson in 1974 saw the Arts Lab move into comic art, producing a series of publications under its own Ar:Zak imprint. Starting with Emerson's own Large Cow Comix – which also featured work by Kevin O'Neill and Bryan Talbot – and eventually branching out such varied publications as Steve Bell's Big Foot; David Edgar's anti-Nazi Committed Comix and Suzy Varty's Heroine (the first British women's comic), Ar:Zak was to become an important part of the history of underground British comics, a position reinforced when the Arts Lab held KAK – the first Konvention of Alternative Komix in 1976.

== Sources ==
- Birmingham Arts Lab: the phantom of liberty. Birmingham: Birmingham Museums and Art Gallery. 1998. OCLC 60370741.
