= S.I.L.V.E.R. series =

Book series by Tanith Lee

The Silver Metal Lover
- First edition
- Author: Tanith Lee
- Cover artist: Rob Sauber
- Language: English
- Series: S.I.L.V.E.R.
- Genre: Science Fiction
- Publisher: DAW Hardcover
- Publication date: December 1981
- Media type: Print
- ISBN: 0-8099-5000-6
- OCLC: 17779079
- Followed by: Metallic Love

The S.I.L.V.E.R. series is a fantasy novel series by Tanith Lee. The Silver Metal Lover, published in 1981, is the first in the series. Metallic Love, published in 2005, is the second novel.

== The Silver Metal Lover ==
=== Plot summary ===
In the distant future, mechanical labor has left few jobs behind and most people rely on an insufficient universal basic income. Electronic Metals (EM), a robot manufacturing company, releases a line of companion robots – performing artists and sexual companions. Jane, the narrator, is a lonely 16-year-old, emotionally dependent on her wealthy mother who dictates her opinions, appearance, and sexual development. Jane is insecure around her rich friends, and the fact that she is only able to fall in love with fictional characters and actors while they are able to pursue full relationships.

Believing him to be human, she finally falls in love with S.I.L.V.E.R (Silver), a robot musician on public display as part of EM’s advertising campaign, then lashes out at him in revulsion upon discovering he is a robot. Jane’s actress friend, Egyptia, hires Silver out as an escort, complicating her feelings. Acting against her mother’s knowledge for the first time, Jane saves Silver from being deconstructed after EM’s dissatisfaction with him and purchases him under eighteen year old Egyptia’s name with a loan, since Jane herself is a minor. Knowing her mother will disapprove, she sells her belongings to run away with Silver and live as an ordinary couple, busking for a living together.

Silver slowly encourages Jane to move past her mother’s emotional abuse and develop confidence, while Jane allows Silver to accept that he has become more human than he would like to admit, due to the pain of being considered inferior. When a product recall is issued by EM, Jane and Silver attempt to flee the city but are caught by EM. Silver is disassembled and Jane attempts suicide, but is saved by her friend, Clovis, who later explains Egyptia had called the police in fear that robots would soon replace actors as well. Jane is despondent until Clovis attempts an electronic séance that ends up allowing Silver’s ‘soul’ to communicate through it, revealing to Jane that he exists in the electronics around her. He encourages her to continue living on his part – she finds hope to carry on and publishes their story.

=== Adaptations ===
A graphic novel of the Silver Metal Lover, adapted by Trina Robbins, was published by Crown Books in 1985 but later went out of print. A successful Kickstarter campaign to reprint the book was completed in early 2018 by the IDW imprint It's Alive!. The new edition will feature a variant cover and afterword by Colleen Doran, a foreword by Gail Simone, an essay by Tanith Lee's husband John Kaiine, and a new introduction by Trina Robbins.

Singer Julia Ecklar, in her album Divine Intervention (released in 1986), recorded a song titled "Silver" which is based on Lee's novel. The song is from Silver's point of view about Jane's feelings for him, basically being a tune about an impossible love. Just as in The Silver Metal Lover, there are hints about Silver also caring for Jane (although the song also implies that Silver is not capable of love). Ecklar plays off of the uncertain relationship between the two characters: the melody is soft and romantic despite its conflicting lyrics.

== Metallic Love ==
=== Plot summary ===
As an orphan growing up in the slums, Loren read her secret copy of Jane's Story over and over, relishing every word. However, Loren is not like Jane from Jane's Story. Loren is savvy and street-smart. As such, Loren is not easily stirred by a men of metal. Despite her differences, Loren's passion is none the less ignited by an almost-human. In this case one designed for pleasure.

Still, when the META corporation brings back updated versions of robots, Loren seeks out Silver, who has been reborn Verlis with near-godlike powers. The two become lovers. While Loren distrusts Verlis, she follows the machine into a battle to control his destiny.

== Series ==
Tanith Lee expressed interest in writing a third novel in the series, titled The Tin Man, which would return to the story of Silver and Jane. However, Lee died in 2015, and the status of this potential story at the time of her death remains unknown.
