= Barbara Mendes =

American cartoonist and fine artist

- Born: January 30, 1948 (age 78)
- Areas: Painter, Cartoonist
- Pseudonym: Willy
- Notable works: It Ain't Me Babe; Queen of Cosmos Comix
- Awards: Inkpot Award (2022)

Barbara "Willy" Mendes (/ˈmɛndɛz/; born January 30, 1948) is an American cartoonist, fine artist, and member of the underground comix movement. She is best known for her work alongside Trina Robbins on It Ain't Me Babe and All Girl Thrills.

Mendes worked in underground comix while also producing other work for exhibitions in art galleries around the United States. Her art is inspired by Judaism and feminist themes. Although Mendes first created art under the name "Willy" Mendes, she later reverted to her given name Barbara. (Note: "Willy" was a nickname given to her by her first husband, rock and roll musician Rick "Rollings" Kunstler, in honor of the Latin jazz percussionist Willie Bobo.)

== Career ==
She attended New York City's High School of Music & Art, followed by further education at the University of California, Riverside.

Mendes began her career in underground comix in the late 1960s. She collaborated with Trina Robbins and Nancy Kalish on Gothic Blimp Works, the comix supplement of the East Village Other, an underground newspaper. Mendes and Robbins continued working together, publishing It Ain't Me Babe, the first comic book produced entirely by women, in 1970. In 1971, Mendes published Illuminations, which portrays more psychedelic work.

She then stepped away from the comix scene, moving into painting and fine art.

In 2017, after completing a mural in a Sephardic synagogue in Los Angeles, Mendes began to study Torah and actively practice Judaism. Mendes later opened her own art gallery in downtown Los Angeles, where she paints brightly colored biblical narratives based on Genesis, Exodus, and Leviticus, the first three books of the Torah.

Mendes returned to comix in 2020 with the release of Queen of Cosmos Comix from Red 5 Comics. The comic integrates her spiritual and feminist vision, using traditional hand‑ink techniques, comic paneling, word balloons, and meticulous narratives steeped in religious and cosmic symbolism. Volume 2 of Queen of Cosmos Comix launched in full color at the 2023 Jewish Comics Experience convention, and a collected edition of Volumes 1–3 is forthcoming via Fantagraphics.

In 2022, Mendes was a special guest at San Diego Comic-Con and received an Inkpot Award for her contributions to comics and art.

== Style and themes ==
Mendes' comics work is notable for its unique visual language: dense, intricately detailed panels, often framed by cosmic symbolism and word‑balloon narratives. Her early comix work foregrounded feminist concerns without resorting to raw sexuality; she claims that "it was about hippies saving the world through spirituality."

Her later biblical "Epic Paintings" consist of brightly colored, narrative imagery displaying biblical stories and messages — to Mendes, color is “the light of God,” merging image, mysticism, and memoir.

== In other media ==
A scene from Bruno Kohfield-Galeano's short film The Blinking Game (2017) was filmed in Mendes' studio and features many of her paintings.

== Bibliography ==
=== Comics ===
- "Make Money, Sell American Seeds," in Slow Death Funnies #1 (Last Gasp, April 1970)
- "Oma," in It Ain't Me, Babe (Last Gasp, July 1970)
- "Ada," in Insect Fear #2 (Print Mint, Mar. 1971)
- "Take This Woman Comix" in San Francisco Comic Book #3 (Print Mint, Aug. 1971)
- Multiple stories in All Girl Thrills #1 (Print Mint, 1971)
- "Easy Come Easy Go," in Yellow Dog #23 (Print Mint, Oct. 1972)
- "The Hippy Wedding," in The Someday Funnies (Abrams, 2011) — reprint of a story from the 1970s
- Queen of Cosmos Comix (Red 5 Comics, 2020)

=== Editor ===
- It Ain't Me, Babe (Last Gasp, July 1970)
- Illuminations (1971)
