= It Ain't Me, Babe (comics) =

1970 one-shot underground comic book

- Cover of the first print run, showing Olive Oyl, Little Lulu, Wonder Woman, Sheena, Queen of the Jungle, Mary Marvel and Elsie the Cow, with their fists raised, and the words "women's liberation".

Publication information
- Publisher: Last Gasp
- Format: Standard
- Genre: Underground comix
- Publication date: July 1970
- No. of issues: 1

Creative team
- Artist(s): Trina Robbins, Barbara "Willy" Mendes, Nancy Kalish-Burton, Carole, Lisa Lyons, Meredith Kurtzman, Michele Brand
- Editor(s): Trina Robbins and Barbara "Willy" Mendes

It Ain't Me Babe Comix is a one-shot underground comic book published in 1970. It is the first comic book produced entirely by women. It was co-produced by Trina Robbins and Barbara "Willy" Mendes, and published by Last Gasp. Robbins and other staff members from a feminist newspaper in Berkeley, California, also called It Ain't Me, Babe, contributed. Many of the creators from the It Ain't Me Babe comic went on to contribute to the long-running series Wimmen's Comix.

== Background ==
Female cartoonists Robbins, Mendes, and "Hurricane" Nancy Kalish-Burton (who sometimes signed her work "Panzika") were frustrated with the boy's club atmosphere of underground comix, which was dominated by male artists glorying in their depictions of sex, drugs and rock & roll—and the casual misogyny typical of those stories. The editors recruited other contributors, including "Carole" (her last name is unknown, though she is sometimes incorrectly identified as Carol Kalish), Lisa Lyons (a cartoonist for a socialist newspaper), Meredith Kurtzman (cartoonist and daughter of Mad magazine creator Harvey Kurtzman), and Michele Brand (Roger Brand's wife and, according to Robbins, "a better artist").

Last Gasp publisher Ron Turner was interested in publishing a comic tied to the women's liberation movement, and he paid Robbins $1,000 for the publishing rights.

== Publication history ==
The 36-page one-shot was published in July 1970. The cover of the first printing featured Olive Oyl, Little Lulu, Wonder Woman, Sheena, Queen of the Jungle, Mary Marvel and Elsie the Cow on a blue-and-fuchsia background with the words "women's liberation"; the second and third covers featured the same characters on a dark-blue-and-green background. The first print run sold 20,000 copies; the second and third sold 10,000 each.

It Ain't Me, Babe was reprinted in The Complete Wimmen's Comix, published by Fantagraphics Books in February 2016.

== Legacy ==
The success of It Ain't Me, Babe led Turner to ask two of his employees, Patricia Moodian and Terre Richards—who teamed with Robbins—to recruit creators for another women's lib comic, which in 1972 became the Wimmen's Comix Collective.

== See also ==
- List of feminist comic books
