= Wimmen's Comix =

All-female underground comics anthology

- The cover to Wimmen's Comix #1 (November 1972), art by Patricia Moodian.

Publication information
- Publisher: Last Gasp (1972–1985); Renegade Press (1987–1988); Rip Off Press (1989–1992)
- Schedule: Annually
- Format: Ongoing series
- Publication date: November 1972 - 1992
- No. of issues: 17

Creative team
- Artist(s): Trina Robbins, Michelle Brand, Lee Marrs, Sharon Rudahl, Aline Kominsky-Crumb, Diane Noomin, Carol Tyler, M. K. Brown, Leslie Ewing, Joyce Farmer, Melinda Gebbie, Roberta Gregory, Phoebe Gloeckner, Carol Lay, Dori Seda, Mary Fleener, Krystine Kryttre, Angela Bocage
- Editor(s): Patricia Moodian, Lee Marrs, Sharon Rudahl, Shelby Sampson, Trina Robbins, Terry Richards, Becky Wilson, Barb Brown, Melinda Gebbie, Dot Bucher, Kathryn LeMieux, Lee Binswanger, Caryn Leschen, Rosemary Dinegar, Joyce Farmer, Krystine Kryttre, Dori Seda, Angela Bocage, Rebecka Wright, Phoebe Gloeckner

Wimmen's Comix, later retitled (respelled) as Wimmin's Comix, is an influential all-female underground comics anthology published from 1972 to 1992. Though it covered a wide range of genres and subject matters, Wimmen's Comix focused more than other anthologies of the time on feminist concerns, homosexuality, sex and politics in general, and autobiographical comics. Wimmen's Comix was a launching pad for many cartoonists' careers, and it inspired other small-press and self-published titles like Twisted Sisters, Dyke Shorts, and Dynamite Damsels.

Each issue of Wimmen's Comix was edited by a different editor or two editors who shared the job. Last Gasp published the first ten issues; later issues were put out by Renegade Press and then Rip Off Press.

== Publication history ==
=== Antecedents ===
Wimmen's Comix debuted a few years after the publication of the 1970 one-shot It Ain't Me, Babe, the first American comic book entirely produced by women, which was put together by Trina Robbins, the most prolific and influential of the women cartoonists in the underground scene. It Ain't Me Babe was a feminist newspaper in Berkeley, California. Many of the creators from the It Ain't Me Babe comic went on to contribute to Wimmen's Comix. Last Gasp, the publisher of It Ain't Me Babe, was the first publisher of Wimmen's Comix.

=== The collective comes together ===
Originally, the group behind Wimmen's Comix was not an official collective, but rather a few women artists who came together with a common interest to create at least one comic that women could get paid to be in, in a male-dominated comix culture.

=== Issue #1 ===
With Last Gasp agreeing to publish the comic, the first issue appeared in November 1972, edited by musician and artist Patricia Moodian. Contributors to issue #1 included Moodian, Michele Brand, Lora Fountain, Aline Kominsky, Lee Marrs, Diane Noomin, Sharon Rudahl, Trina Robbins, Shelby Sampson, and Janet Wolfe Stanley. Trina Robbins' story "Sandy Comes Out" was the first comic strip featuring an "out" lesbian. Marrs' story, "All in a Day's Work", epitomizes how a woman's only leverage in a male-dominated society is to utilize her body to negotiate politics.

=== Twisted Sisters breakaway ===
In 1975, after four issues of Wimmen's Comix, regular contributors Aline Kominsky-Crumb and Diane Noomin left the collective over internal conflicts which were both aesthetic and political; Kominsky-Crumb later claimed that a large part of the break was related to her own romantic relationship with Robert Crumb, whose comics and personality Robbins particularly objected to.

Noomin and Kominksy subsequently put together Twisted Sisters, a one-shot published in June 1976 by Last Gasp which featured their own humorous and "self-deprecating" stories and art. (Many years later, many Wimmen's Comix' contributors, including Kominsky-Crumb, Noomin, Penny Van Horn, Carol Tyler, M. K. Brown, Phoebe Gloeckner, Carol Lay, Caryn Leschen, Leslie Sternbergh, Dori Seda, Mary Fleener, and Krystine Kryttre, were published in Twisted Sisters: A Collection of Bad Girl Art [Viking Penguin] and Twisted Sisters: Drawing the Line [Kitchen Sink Press], both edited by Noomin.)

=== Publishing hiatus and new publishers ===
After Wimmen's Comix issue #7 (Dec. 1976) there was a six-year publishing hiatus before the appearance of issue #8 (Mar. 1983). Last Gasp's final issue was #10 (Oct. 1985), with Renegade Press taking over the title with issue #11 (Apr. 1987). Renegade went out of business in 1988-1989, but Wimmen's Comix was saved by Rip Off Press, which published the final four issues, beginning with issue #14 (1989).

=== Wimmin's Comix/cancellation ===
In 1992, for issue #17, the title of the comic was changed to Wimmin's Comix following a discussion over the gender politics of words containing "man" or "men" (see womyn). This, and other political conflicts, along with financial difficulties and the increasing availability of other venues for independent female cartoonists, led to the end of the series after that issue. In explaining the reason for the title's cancellation, then-editor Caryn Leschen said:

"This book has been printed on cheap paper which will turn yellow in a few years. The print run was too small and all the stores, as usual, will sell out, but they won't reorder because 'Women don't buy comix'. Bullshit. How did they sell out in the first place? It's always like that. What a waste of time and energy. Forget it".

== Issues ==
Many issues of Wimmen's Comix were themed issues with their own subtitles.

1. (Nov. 1972, Patricia Moodian, ed.)
2. (1973, Lee Marrs, ed.)
3. (Oct. 1973, Sharon Rudahl, ed.) — "Fun & Games Issue"
4. (1974, Shelby Sampson, ed.)
5. (June 1975, Trina Robbins and Terry Richards, eds.) — "International"
6. (Dec. 1975, Becky Wilson and Barb Brown, eds.) — "Special Bicentennial Issue"
7. (Dec. 1976, Melinda Gebbie and Dot Bucher, eds.) — "Outlaws"
8. (Mar. 1983, Kathryn LeMieux and Lee Binswanger, eds.) — "The 21st Century Woman"
9. (May 1984, Caryn Leschen and Rosemary Dinegar, eds.)
10. (Oct. 1985, Joyce Farmer, ed.) — "International Politically Incorrect Fetish Issue"
11. (Apr. 1987, Krystine Kryttre and Dori Seda, eds.) — "Fashion Confidential"
12. (Nov. 1987, Angela Bocage and Rebecka Wright, eds.) — "3-D"
13. (1988, Lee Binswanger, ed.) — "Occult"
14. (1989, Trina Robbins, ed.) — "Disastrous Relationships"
15. (1989, Phoebe Gloeckner and Angela Bocage, eds.) — "Little Girls"
16. (1990, Rebecka Wright, ed.) — "Men"
17. (1992, Caryn Leschen, ed.) — "Kvetch Issue"

== Collections ==
- Robbins, Trina. The Best of Wimmen's Comix, and Other Comix by Women (London: Hassle Free Press, 1979).
- The Complete Wimmen's Comix (Fantagraphics, Feb. 2016) — two-volume collection of every issue of Wimmen's Comix.

== Contributors ==
- Lee Binswanger
- Angela Bocage
- Barb Brown
- Michele Brand
- M.K. Brown
- Dot Bucher
- Leslie Ewing
- Joyce Farmer
- Mary Fleener
- Lora Fountain
- Melinda Gebbie
- Phoebe Gloeckner
- Roberta Gregory
- Joan Hilty
- Aline Kominsky
- Krystine Kryttre
- Carol Lay
- Caryn Leschen
- Kathryn LeMieux
- Lee Marrs
- Patricia Moodian
- Andrea Natalie
- Diane Noomin
- Margery Peters (as Margery Petchesky)
- Chris Powers
- Terry Richards
- Trina Robbins
- Kay Rudin
- Sharon Rudahl
- Nina Salina
- Shelby Sampson
- Dori Seda
- Cheela Smith
- Janet Wolfe Stanley
- Leslie Sternbergh
- Carol Tyler
- Jackie Urbanovic
- Suzy Varty
- Penny Van Horn
- Mary Wilshire

== See also ==
- Tits & Clits Comix
- Friends of Lulu
