= Leslie Ewing =

American cartoonist and activist (born 1949)

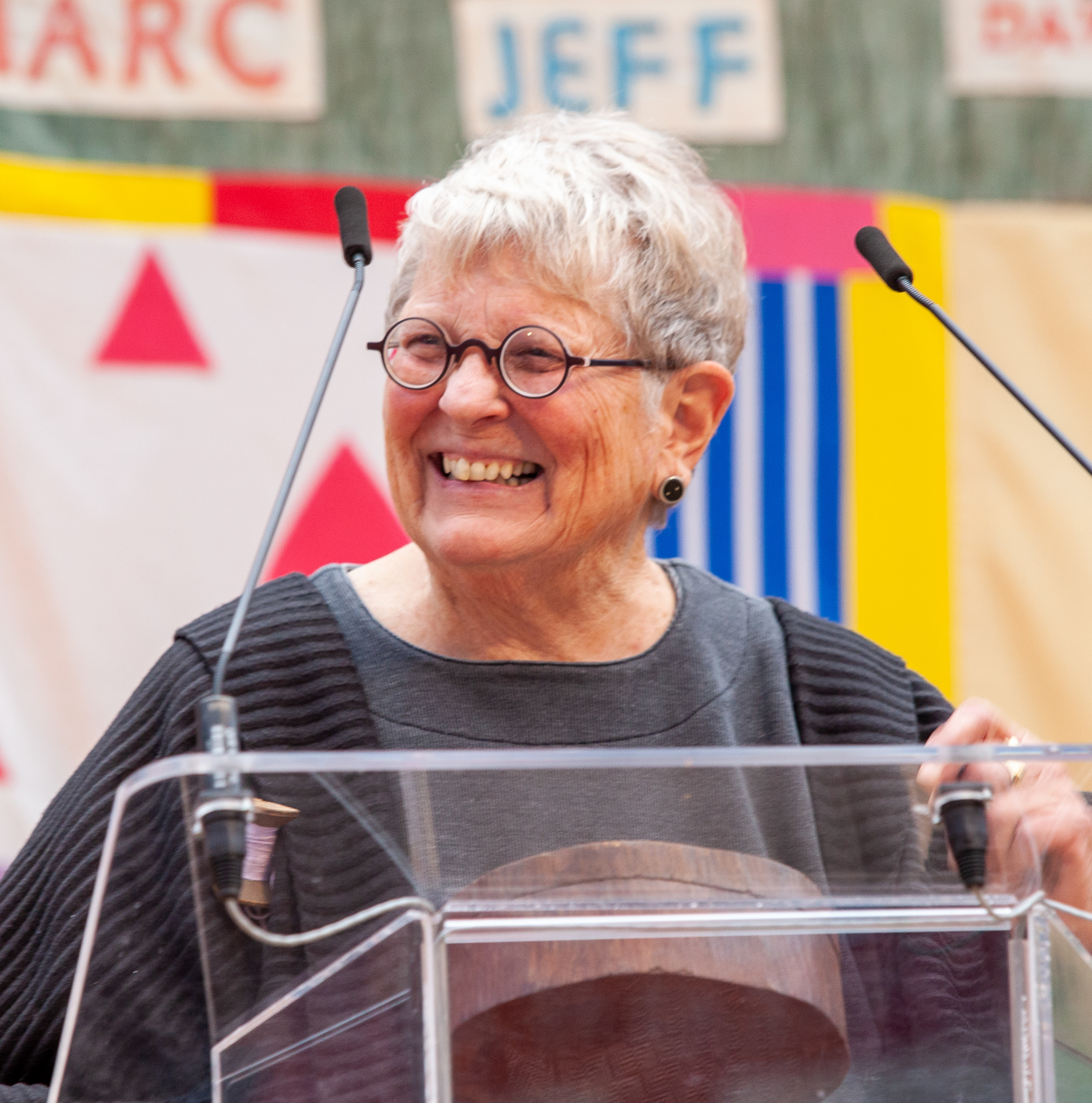
- Ewing speaking at the National AIDS Memorial on World AIDS Day 2019
- Born: 1949 (age 76–77); Tustin, California
- Education: University of California, Los Angeles (B.A.)
- Occupations: Cartoonist and activist
- Years active: 1981–present
- Website: Official website

Leslie Ewing (born 1949) is an American cartoonist, activist, and breast cancer survivor. Her comics highlight feminist and lesbian themes and her cartoons have been featured in prominent queer comics, including Gay Comix, Strip AIDS, and Wimmen's Comix. Ewing was the executive director for the Pacific Center for Human Growth from 2008 to 2019.

== Early life and education ==
Leslie Ewing was born in Tustin, California. Ewing reported her interests in cartoons grew when her mother would buy her cartoons at the market. Ewing was influenced by cartoons such as Richie Rich and Rick Griffin's Murch the Surf. She was even interested in cartoons featured throughout Playboy magazines.

Ewing studied at the University of California, Los Angeles from 1969 to 1971, and earned a Bachelors of Arts in design. She was also a member of the Kappa Delta sorority during her time at the university.

== Career ==
Ewing contributed many celebrated comics, including "Mid-Dyke Crisis" and "It Gets Bitter." Ewing was also a prominent figure in activism for LGBTQ+ rights, as well as breast cancer and AIDS awareness.

=== Comics ===
Ewing first became active as a cartoonist in 1983. Her comics ran in many periodicals, including Lesbian News, Dykespeak Icon, Wimmen's Comix, and Gay Comix. Ewing's comic "The Young and the Professional" was her first comic featured in Wimmen's Comix. Ewing remained a contributor to Wimmen's Comix until its last edition in 1992, including comics such as "Buzz-Off!" "Urbanus Jockitus," "Hoodoo Voodoo," "Mid-Dyke Crisis #382," "Baby Butch Dyke!" and "National Healthcare." Ewing was also a prominent cartoonist in Gay Comix, with her first comic "Couple-itus" featured in 1985, and contributed comics including "Mid-Dyke Crisis," "Romance in the Age of Aids," "Mid-Dyke Crisis," and "Four Favorites" until its last edition in 1998. Ewing reported that her comics were inspired by politics after she participated in the March on Washington in 1987, as seen by her contribution to both political comic books: StripAIDS USA and Choices: A Pro-Choice Benefit Comic. Her comic, Mid-Dyke Crisis, ran from 1985 to 2001 as a popular comic strip in Icon and other anthologies. After taking a hiatus creating comics, Ewing released "It Gets Bitter," a compilation and review of her comics throughout her years as a cartoonist.

=== Activism ===
Ewing stated that her interest in activism began when she went to the 1987 March on Washington, and politics became an important aspect of her comics. Ewing claimed that a defining moment of her life was when she was arrested during a protest at the Food and Drug Administration, and partly spurred her career in activism. Ewing was the volunteer coordinator for the Display of Names Project in Washington, D.C., from 1988 to 1989 and on the National Steering Committee for the March on Washington for Lesbian, Gay and Bi Equal Rights and Liberation in 1993. She served as president of the board of directors for the San Francisco AIDS Emergency Fund and a founder for the Breast Cancer Emergency Fund. Ewing joined the Pacific Center for Human Growth as an executive director in September 2008. She retired in July 2019.

== Personal life ==
Ewing is a lesbian. She was in a relationship with a man for ten years until she came out in 1980. Ewing was diagnosed with breast cancer, and has been in remission since 2010. She lost her partner to breast cancer in 2002. Ewing is dedicated to exercise, and features her gym routine lightheartedly throughout her comics.

== Bibliography ==
=== Contributions ===
Ewing's works has appeared in:

- Wimmen's Comix #9, #10, #12, #13, #14, #15, #17 (Last Gasp, 1984–1992)
- Gay Comix #6, #11, #12, #14, #25 (Bob Ross, 1985–1998)
- Strip AIDS USA (Last Gasp, 1988)
- Choices: A Pro-Choice Benefit Comic (Angry Isis Press, 1990)
- Dyke Strippers (Cleiss Press, 1995)
