= Pacific Center for Human Growth =

LGBT community center

The Pacific Center for Human Growth, or simply the Pacific Center, is a community center focusing on LGBTQ people. The center operates from a Victorian house on Telegraph Avenue.

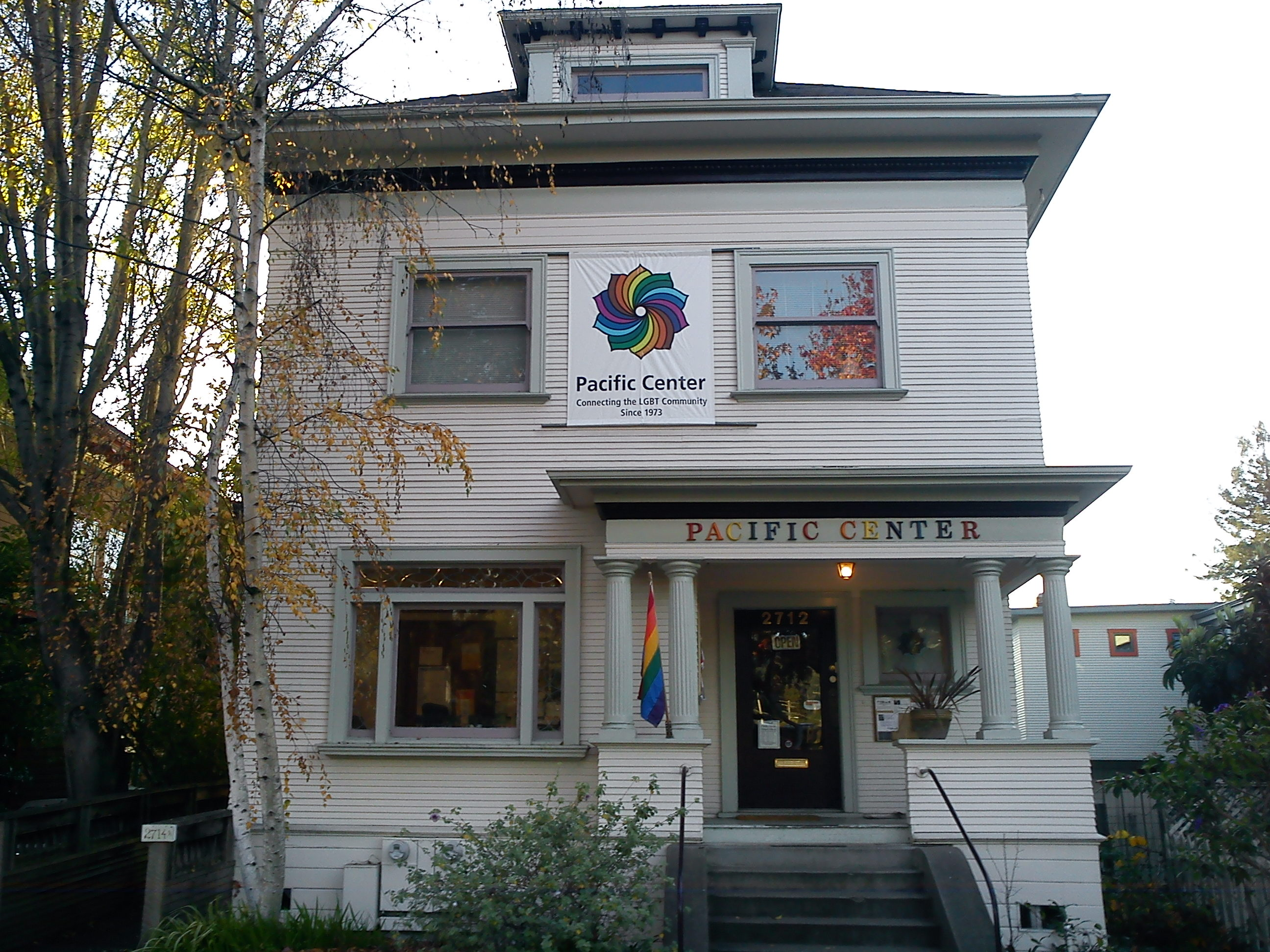
Pacific Center as seen from the street

== History ==
The center was founded in 1973 as a response to a brutal gay bashing in downtown Oakland, a major city that neighbors Berkeley. Often referred to as the Berkeley LGBT or gay Center, it is the oldest LGBT community center in the Bay Area and the third oldest in the country. Will Roscoe campaigned successfully in 1976 for United Way membership for the Pacific Center, the first LGBT agency to achieve this.

The Oakland-East Bay Gay Men's Chorus was founded under the auspices of the Pacific Cent in 1999 before becoming an independent organization.

In 2001 the Pacific Center was involved in trying to help the city curb cruising for sex by men in Berkeley Aquatic Park by getting the city to set up a support network for men who have sex with men that do not identify as gay or bisexual. However, funding was never acquired.

In 2002 the center was vandalised with anti-gay and neo-Nazi-themed tagging, considered a hate crime by the center. Flyers on the bulletin board at the entrance to the center were vandalized with the anti-gay slur "fag" and a swastika.

When California legalized same-sex marriage in 2008, the youth group at the center marched around the neighborhood with the rainbow flag to celebrate the victory as the center was actively involved in campaigning for equal gay rights.

== Operations and location ==
The center, along with Berkeley and the larger surrounding region is known for their eclecticism and liberalism and the Pacific Center is not different.

In the past it has offered drag-quit smoking classes, transgender film screenings, and young queer women's groups among other unique initiatives.

Today the center offers peer support groups alongside mental health counseling for LGBT people from the community. There is also a drop-in after school program for LGBT, Questioning, and Intersex youth.

The center is located along the AC Transit 1R BRT line and is within walking distance of Ashby BART station.
