= Jackie Urbanovic =

American cartoonist

- Education: Maryland Institute College of Art (BFA)
- Occupations: Author; illustrator
- Website: jackieurbanovic.com

Jackie Urbanovic is an American New York Times best-selling author and illustrator. The majority of her work consists of children's picture books, including her self-authored Max the Duck series. She regularly speaks at libraries and educational events for children. She was a member of the Children's Book Guild. She lives in Silver Spring, Maryland, where she has a studio for her work.

== Career ==
Urbanovic received a BFA from the Maryland Institute College of Art. Her career started in graphic design and cartoons, then realizing she would prefer to illustrate children's literature. She studied writing under the mentorship of Jane Resh Thomas in 1997 and after submitting her work to Highlights, received her first trade illustration job on Spaghetti Eddie. Before she started her children's literature career, she contributed to several anthologies and comics series regarding LGBT themes and issues in the 1980s and 1990s. She has been credited as the Artist-In-Residence at the fictional Molesworth Institute.

== Published works ==
=== Books ===
==== Self-authored and illustrated ====
- Do Your Ears Hang Low? (Sing and Read Storybook). Scholastic, 2005. ISBN 978-0439733533
- Duck at the Door. HarperCollins, 2007. ISBN 978-0061214400
- Duck Soup. HarperCollins, 2008. ISBN 978-0061214417
- Duck and Cover. HarperCollins, 2009. ISBN 978-0061214448
- Sitting Duck. HarperCollins, 2010. ISBN 978-0061765834
- Ducks in a Row. HarperCollins, 2011. ISBN 978-0061864377
- Happy Go Ducky. HarperCollins, 2012. ISBN 978-0061864391
- Prince of a Frog. Orchard Books, 2015. ISBN 9780545636520
- Splatypus. Two Lions, 2017. ISBN 978-1503939202

==== Illustrated ====
- Do the Hokey Pokey. Cricket Books, 2001. ISBN 978-0812626995
- Horace the Horrible. Marshall Cavendish Corp, 2003. ISBN 978-0761451099
- The Ten Best Things About My Dad. Cartwheel, 2004. ISBN 978-0439577694
- Bully Blockers Club. Albert Whitman & Company, 2004. ISBN 978-0807509197
- Grandma Lena's Big Ol' Turnip. Albert Whitman & Company, 2005. ISBN 978-0807530238
- Don't Squeal Unless It's a Big Deal. Magination Press, 2005. ISBN 9781591472407
- Glamsters. Hyperion Book CH, 2008. ISBN 1423111486
- Spaghetti Eddie. Boyds Mills Press, 2009. ISBN 978-1590787786
- No Sleep for the Sheep! HMH Books for Young Readers, 2011. ISBN 978-0152049690
- If You're Hoppy. Greenwillow Books, 2011. ISBN 978-0061566349
- I've Lost My Hippopotamus. Greenwillow Books, 2012. ISBN 978-0062014573
- King of the Zoo. Orchard Books, 2013. ISBN 978-0545461825
- I Want Your Smile, Crocodile. Zonderkidz, 2018. ISBN 978-0310758907

=== Other published contributions ===
- Gay Comix #4, "A Word From Our Sponsor..."
- Wimmen's Comix #14, "Losers in Love"
- Strip AIDS U.S.A.
- Choices: A Pro-Choice Benefit Comic Anthology for the National Organization of Women
- Dyke Strippers: Lesbian Cartoonists from A to Z
- Men Are From Detroit, Women Are From Paris
