= The Lemming =

Dutch glam rock band

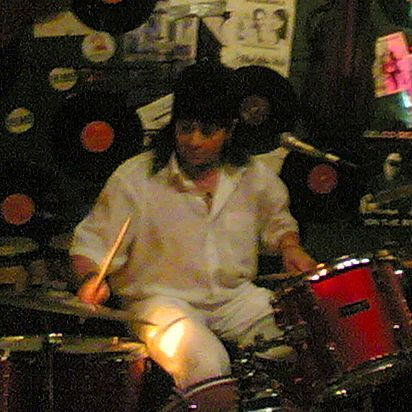
The Lemming drummer Tony Gloudie at the last opening night of Café de Beukelsbrug in Rotterdam (27 June 2009).

The Lemming (formerly known as Lemming and before that as Life Color) is a Dutch glam rock band which scored three hits in the Dutch Top 40 between 1973 and 1975.

The band originally consisted of lead singer Wally McKey, guitarists Hans Vos and Harry Bruintjes, bassist Tinny Durrell and drummer Tony Gloudie. Of these only the first and the last named are still active for the band.

The band originally existed between 1973 and 1982 as Lemming and was relaunched as The Lemming in 2002 by Wally Mckey.
