= Norman D. Stevens =

American librarian

Norman D. Stevens (1932 - Dec. 15, 2018) was the director of University Libraries at the University of Connecticut and the author of A Guide to Collecting Librariana. He is considered one of the world's greatest collectors of librariana. His collection is housed at the Canadian Centre for Architecture, except for the ALA and Library Badge and Button Collection which is archived with the American Library Association. He also collected hand-carved wooden spoons; his collection will become part of the Peabody Essex Museum.

Stevens was one of the creators of The Molesworth Institute, a fictional organization devoted to library humor. Using various pen names, he wrote many satirical articles on aspects of librarianship, including Preserving Books with Jell-O™ under the pen name Nouleigh Rhee Furbished, which was published in the Journal of Irreproducible Results. The Institute’s Library Humor Archives are in the University Archives at the Dodd Research Center, along with Stevens' personal papers.

== Publications ==
- A Comparative Study of Three Systems of Information Retrieval (1961)
- Library Humor: A Bibliothecal Miscellany to 1970 (1971)
- Landmarks of Library Literature, 1876-1976 (1976) with Dianne J. Ellsworth
- Communication Throughout Libraries (1983)
- Archives of Library Research From the Molesworth Institute (1985)
- A Guide to Collecting Librariana (1986)
- Postcards in the Library: Invaluable Visual Resources (1995)
- A Gathering of Spoons: The Design Gallery of the World's Most Stunning Wooden Art Spoons (2012)
