= Lemmings (Bachdenkel album) =

Studio album by Bachdenkel
- Released: 29 May 1973
- Recorded: 1 June – 15 July 1970 at Europa Sonor Studios, Paris, France. Various mixing done between August 1970 and January 1973
- Studio: Europa Sonor
- Genre: Progressive rock, psychedelic rock
- Label: Philips (1973) The Initial Recording Company (1978) Ork 2007
- Producer: Karel Beer

Bachdenkel chronology
Lemmings (1973)	Stalingrad (1977)

Lemmings is the first studio album by British progressive rock group Bachdenkel. Conceived as a three sided album it was recorded during the summer of 1970 after the group relocated to France, but would not be released for nearly three years, in 1973 by which time it had used up over 12,000 pounds of unpaid studio time (the equivalent to over £129,000 in 2022). Despite interest in the UK from CBS and Warner Brothers in 1973 studio owners Europa Sonor struck a deal with Philips in France who would release it as a two sided album. In 1978 it was released with 3 missing tracks on an enclosed EP by the Initial Recording Company that was created by Karel Beer.

== Track listing ==
=== Side one ===
1. "Translation" 4:17
2. "Equals" 1:51
3. "An Appointment with the Master" 5:15
4. "The Settlement Song" 11:26

=== Side two ===
1. "Long Time Living" 2:17
2. "Strangerstill" 6:51
3. "Come All Ye Faceless" 9:06

==== 2007 Ork reissue with bonus tracks ====
8. "The Slightest Distance" - 6:09 - From Lemmings EP originally released in 1978.
9. "Donna" 4:15 - From Lemmings EP originally released in 1978.
10. "A Thousand Pages Before" 6:35 - From Lemmings EP originally released in 1978.
11. "Through The Eyes of a Child" 4:01 - Unreleased 1969 single.
12. "An (other) Appointment with the Master" 3:42 - 1973 single version.
13. "Strange People" 3:20 - Unreleased 1968 single, as "U Know Who".

== Personnel (original album) ==
- Peter Kimberley: Six-string bass guitar, piano on "Equals", vocals
- Colin Swinburne: (1948 - 2021) Guitar, organ, piano, vocals
- Brian Smith: Drums, percussion
- Karel Beer: Organ on "Come All Ye Faceless"
