= Carol Lay =

American alternative cartoonist (born 1952)

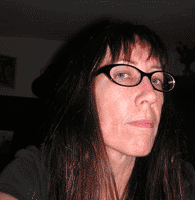
- Lay, photographed in 2006
- Born: 1952 (age 73–74) Whittier, California
- Area: Cartoonist
- Notable works: Way Lay; Good Girls; The Big Skinny; Illiteracy
- Awards: Inkpot Award (1997)

Carol Lay (born 1952) is an American alternative cartoonist best known for her weekly comic strip, Story Minute (later to evolve into the strip Way Lay), which ran for almost 20 years in such US papers as the LA Weekly, the NY Press, and on Salon. Lay has been drawing professionally for over 30 years. Based in Los Angeles, Lay's strips and illustrations have appeared in Entertainment Weekly, Mad, Newsweek, Worth Magazine, The New York Times, The Wall Street Journal, and The New Yorker.

== Biography ==
=== Early life ===
Lay was born in Whittier, California. In 1975 she graduated with a B.F.A. in Fine Arts from UCLA.

=== Career ===
After graduating from UCLA, Lay entered the comics industry at DC Comics, Western Publishing, and Eclipse Comics, while simultaneously writing and drawing underground comics for titles such as Weirdo and her own Good Girls #1–6.

Lay's work, including "Story Minute" appeared in alternative newsweeklies during the 1990s.

She is the author of Mythos, a prose novel featuring Wonder Woman (DC/Pocket Books, 2003), Goodnight, Irene: The Collected Stories of Irene Van de Kamp (Last Gasp, 2007), and The Big Skinny: How I Changed My Fattitude, a Memoir (Villard, 2008).

From 2010 to 2013, Lay wrote and drew Simpsons stories for Bongo Comics.

In 2013, Lay created Murderville #1: "A Farewell to Armories", a self-published, small-print-run, Kickstarter-funded comic featuring twenty-four pages of story plus four front & back, outside & inside cover pages.

On January 26, 2015, Carol Lay's Lay Lines page began on GoComics with a week-long serialization of her story "The Thing Under the Futon" (January 26–30, 2015), followed by serializations of "Now, Endsville" (February 3–10, 2015) and "Invisible City" (April 12–June 26, 2015). Lay Lines has also reprinted pages from Lay's weekly newspaper comic Story Minutes, in color for the first time. New Lay Lines comics feature followups to Murderville.

== Bibliography ==
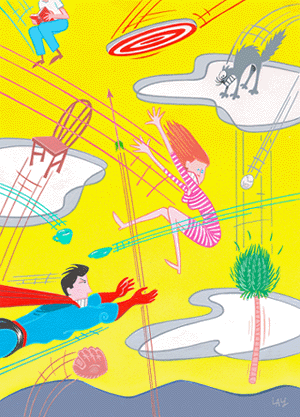
"Meeting Place" by Carol Lay.

- Lay, Carol (w, a). "Reach Out and Touch Someone" Pontiac Tempura (July 1980). unknown publisher.
- Lay, Carol (w, a), Binswanger, Lee and LeMieux, Kathryn (ed). "The Mysogynist" Wimmen's Comix, no. 8 (March 1983). Last Gasp.
- Lay, Carol (as "Cora Lloyd") (w, a), Bagge, Peter (ed). "Midwestern Wedding" Weirdo, no. 10 (Summer 1984). Last Gasp.
- Lay, Carol (w, a), Gilbert, Erick (ed). "Brainfood" Cannibal Romances, no. 1 (1986). Last Gasp.
- Bridwell, E. Nelson; Cavalieri, Joey; Lay, Carol (w), Lay, Carol (a), Gafford, Carl (col), Weiss, David Cody (as "Cody") (let), Thomas, Roy (ed). The Oz-Wonderland Wars, no. 1 (January 1986). DC Comics.
- Bridwell, E. Nelson; Cavalieri, Joey; Lay, Carol (w), Lay, Carol (a), Barube, Liz (col), Lay, Carol (let), Thomas, Roy (ed). The Oz-Wonderland Wars, no. 2 (February 1986). DC Comics.
- Bridwell, E. Nelson; Cavalieri, Joey; Lay, Carol (w), Lay, Carol (a), Barube, Liz (col), Lay, Carol (let), Thomas, Roy (ed). The Oz-Wonderland Wars, no. 3 (March 1986). DC Comics.
- Lay, Carol (w, a). Good Girls, no. 1 (April 1987). Fantagraphics Books.
- Hernandez, Gilbert (w, a), Lay, Carol (col), Hernandez, Gilbert (let), Groth, Gary (ed). "Heartbreak Soup: Space Case" Anything Goes!, no. 4 (May 1987). The Comics Journal.
- Lay, Carol (w, a). Good Girls, no. 2 (October 1987). Fantagraphics Books.
- Lay, Carol (w, a). Good Girls, no. 3 (May 1988). Fantagraphics Books.
- Lay, Carol (w, a). Good Girls, no. 4 (February 1989). Fantagraphics Books.
- Lay, Carol (w, a), Kominsky-Crumb, Aline (ed). "The Prince and the Art Girl" Weirdo, no. 27 (Spring 1990). Last Gasp.
- Lay, Carol (w, a). Good Girls, no. 5 (January 1991). Fantagraphics Books.
- Lay, Carol (w, a). Good Girls, no. 6 (1991). Rip Off Press.
- Lay, Carol (w, a), Kinney, Jay (ed). "Panty Raid" Young Lust, no. 8 (1993). Last Gasp.
- Lay, Carol (w, a), Schreiner, Dave (ed). Now, Endsville (November 1993). Kitchen Sink Press, ISBN 0-87816-235-6.
- Lay, Carol (w, a), Amara, Phil (ed). Joy Ride (January 1996). Kitchen Sink Press, ISBN 0-87816-398-0.
- Lay, Carol (w, a), Couch, Christopher (ed). Strip Joint (September 1998). Kitchen Sink Press, ISBN 0-87816-578-9.
- Wonder Woman: Mythos, Pocket Star, 2003. ISBN 978-0-7434-1711-2. (prose novel)
- Goodnight, Irene: The Collected Stories of Irene Van de Kamp, Last Gasp, 2007. ISBN 978-0-86719-659-7. (collects the Irene Van de Camp stories from Good Girls plus a cover gallery and "About Face" (2006), a new 18-page story drawn for the collection)
- The Big Skinny: How I Changed My Fattitude, A Memoir, Random House, 2008. ISBN 978-0-345-50404-3. (graphic novel/memoir/diet book, with recipes)
- Lay, Carol (w, a), Villanueva, Art (col), Bates, Karen (let), Morrison, Bill (ed). "The Sound and the Flurry" Simpsons Comics Presents Bart Simpson, no. 52 (February 2010). Bongo Comics.
- Lay, Carol (w, a), Hellard, Alan (col), Bates, Karen (let), Morrison, Bill (ed). "The Mystery of the Pesky Desk" Simpsons Comics Presents Bart Simpson, no. 53 (April 2010). Bongo Comics.
- Simpsons Comics Get Some Fancy Book Learnin', Bongo Entertainment, 2010. ISBN 978-1-892849-30-4. (5-page story, new for the collection, Lisa and Maggie Simpson in "Pandora, Jr.")
- Lay, Carol (w, a), Hellard, Alan (col), Bates, Karen (let), Morrison, Bill (ed). "Dirty Laundry" The Simpsons Summer Shindig, no. 4 (May 2010). Bongo Comics.
- Lay, Carol (w, a), Villanueva, Art (col), Bates, Karen (let), Morrison, Bill (ed). "Fortunate Son" Simpsons Comics Presents Bart Simpson, no. 54 (June 2010). Bongo Comics.
- Lay, Carol (w, a), Hellard, Allan (col), Bates, Karen (let), Morrison, Bill (ed). "The Princess Principle" Simpsons Comics Presents Bart Simpson, no. 55 (August 2010). Bongo Comics.
- Lay, Carol (w, a), Villaneuva, Art (col), Bates, Karen (let), Morrison, Bill (ed). "The Generosity Gene" Simpsons Comics, no. 170 (September 2010). Bongo Comics.
- Lay, Carol (w, a), Hamill, Nathan (col), Bates, Karen (let), Morrison, Bill (ed). "A Tomb With a View" Simpsons Comics Presents Bart Simpson, no. 57 (December 2010). Bongo Comics.
- Lay, Carol (w, a), Villanueva, Art (col), Bates, Karen (let), Morrison, Bill (ed). "Pranks a Lot" Simpsons Comics Presents Bart Simpson, no. 58 (February 2011). Bongo Comics.
- Lay, Carol (w, a), Hamill, Nathan (col), Bates, Karen (let), Morrison, Bill (ed). "Sleepless in Springfield" Simpsons Comics Presents Bart Simpson, no. 59 (April 2011). Bongo Comics.
- Lay, Carol (w, a), Villanueva, Art (col), Bates, Karen (let), Morrison, Bill (ed). "Fur'n'Hate 451" The Simpsons Summer Shindig, no. 5 (May 2011). Bongo Comics.
- Duggan, Gerry (w), Lay, Carol (a), Villanueva, Art (col), Bates, Karen (let), Morrison, Bill (ed). "Mousery" Simpsons Comics, no. 179 (June 2011). Bongo Comics.
- Lay, Carol (w, a), Hamill, Nathan (col), Bates, Karen (let), Morrison, Bill (ed). "Planet of the Plants" Simpsons Comics Presents Bart Simpson, no. 61 (July 2011). Bongo Comics.
- Lay, Carol (w, a), Hamill, Nathan (col), Bates, Karen (let), Morrison, Bill (ed). "Guardian Snow Angel" The Simpsons Winter Wingding, no. 6 (January 2012). Bongo Comics.
- Lay, Carol (w, a), Villanueva, Art (col), Bates, Karen (let), Morrison, Bill (ed). "Ralph Wiggum's Day Off" Ralph Wiggum One-Shot, no. 1 (February 2012). Bongo Comics.
- Lay, Carol (w, a), Rote, Mike (i), Villanueva, Art (col), Bates, Karen (let), Morrison, Bill (ed). "The Social Fretwork" Simpsons Comics, no. 190 (May 2012). Bongo Comics.
- Lay, Carol (w, a), Hamill, Nathan (col), Bates, Karen (let), Morrison, Bill (ed). "Tattoo You" Simpsons Summer Shindig, no. 6 (June 2012). Bongo Comics.
- Lay, Carol (w, a), Hamill, Nathan (col), Bates, Karen (let), Morrison, Bill (ed). "Wedgie Issue" Bart Simpson, no. 72 (June 2012). Bongo Comics.
- Lay, Carol (w, a), Hamill, Nathan (col), Bates, Karen (let), Morrison, Bill (ed). "Children of the Corn Maze" Bart Simpson, no. 73 (July 2012). Bongo Comics.
- Lay, Carol (w, a), Hamill, Nathan (col), Bates, Karen (let), Kane, Nathan (ed). "Mean Genie" Li'l Homer, no. 1 (August 2012). Bongo Comics.
- Lay, Carol (w, a), Hamill, Nathan (col), Bates, Karen (let), Kane, Nathan (ed). "Decisions, Decisions" Bart Simpson, no. 74 (August 2012). Bongo Comics.
- Lay, Carol (w, a), Hamill, Nathan (col), Bates, Karen (let), Kane, Nathan (ed). "Scent of a Baby" Maggie, no. 1 (October 2012). Bongo Comics.
- CAROL LAY'S ILLITERATURE: STORY MINUTES Volume One, Boom! Town, 2012. ISBN 978-1-60886-282-5. (Contains 103 STORY MINUTE strips from 1997 to 1999, plus an Introduction by Kim Deitch.)
- Lay, Carol (w, a), Hamill, Nathan (col), Bates, Karen (let), Kane, Nathan (ed). "Maggie and the Moon" Bart Simpson, no. 80 (February 2013). Bongo Comics.
- Lay, Carol (w, a), Villanueva, Art (col), Bates, Karen (let), Kane, Nathan (ed). "Maggie's Pancakes" Bart Simpson, no. 81 (March 2013). Bongo Comics.
- Lay, Carol (w, a), Villanueva, Art (col), Bates, Karen (let), Kane, Nathan (ed). "The Murder Party" Simpsons Comics, no. 201 (April 2013). Bongo Comics.
- Lay, Carol (w, a), Lay, Carol (col), Lay, Carol (let), Lay, Carol (ed). "A Farewell to Armories" MURDERVILLE, no. 1 -- 24 story pages + 4 front & back cover pages -- Kickstarter-funded, self-published (September 2013). Carol Lay.
- BART SIMPSON TO THE RESCUE, Harper, 2014. ISBN 978-0-06-230183-3. (Includes reprints of Carol Lay's SIMPSONS stories "The Mystery of the Pesky Desk", "Fortunate Son", "A Tomb With a View", and "Pranks a Lot".)
- BART SIMPSON BLASTOFF, Harper, 2015. ISBN 978-0-06-236061-8. (Includes reprints of Carol Lay's SIMPSONS stories "Sleepless in Springfield", "The Princess Principle", and "The Planet of the Plants".)
- SIMPSONS COMIC CLUBHOUSE, Harper, 2015, ISBN 978-0-06-236060-1. (Includes reprints of Carol Lay's SIMPSONS stories "Dirty Laundry", and "Fur 'n' Hate 451".)
- MY TIME MACHINE, Fantagraphics, 2024, ISBN 978-1-68-396998-3. (Lay's first full-length original graphic novel)
- MURDERBURG, Fantagraphics, 2025, ISBN 979-8-87-500015-7. (Includes reprints of Carol Lay's MURDERVILLE stories)
