= Sharon Rudahl =

American comic artist and writer

- Born: 1947 (age 78–79)
- Known for: cartoonist, graphic novels, illustrator, political activism
- Movement: underground comix

Sharon Rudahl (born 1947) is an American comic artist, illustrator and writer. She was one of the first female artists who contributed to the underground comix movement of the early 1970s. In 1972, she was part of the women's collective that founded Wimmen's Comix, the first on-going comic drawn exclusively by women.

== Biography ==
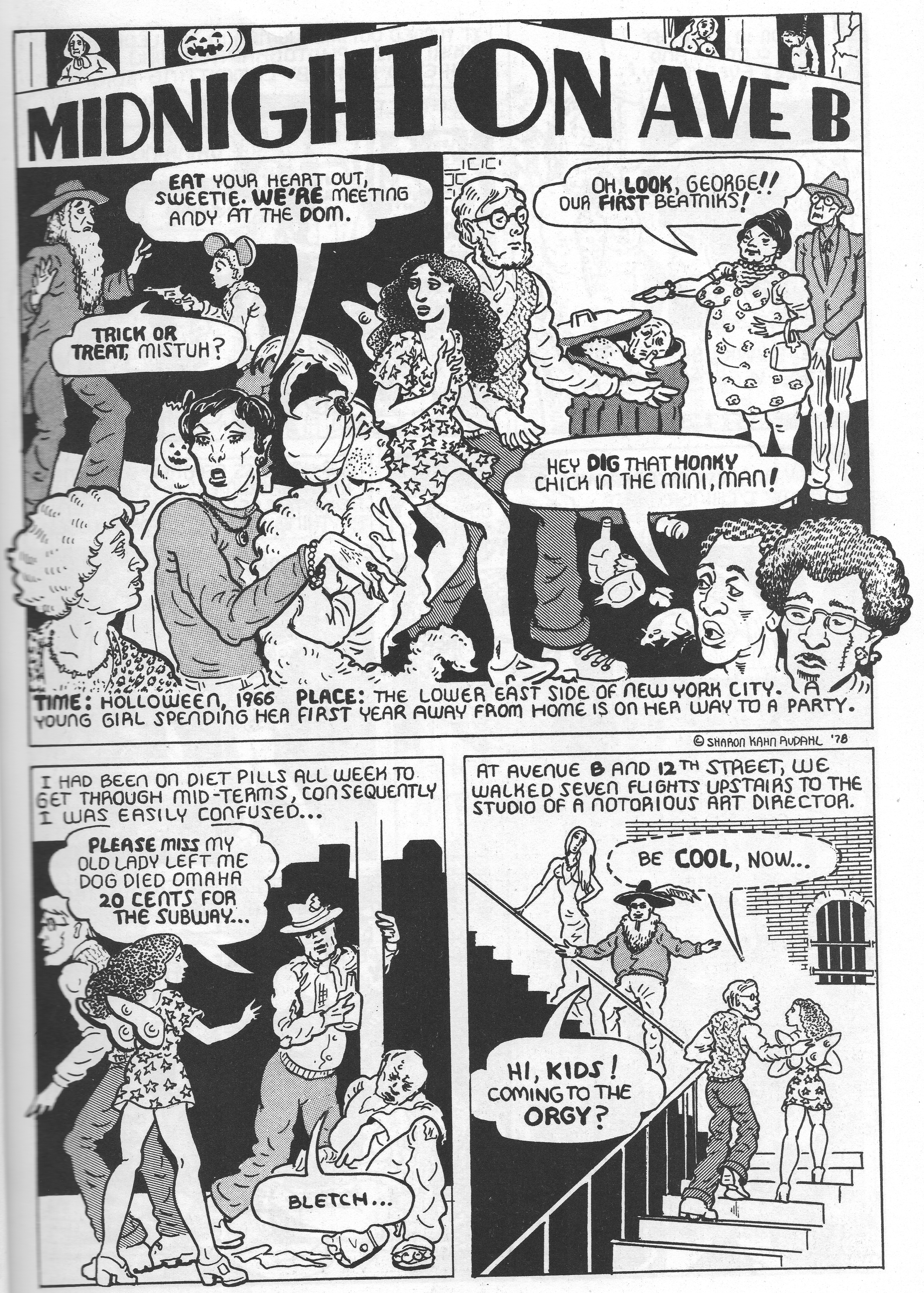
The first page of a four-page story from an early issue of Wimmen's Comix.

Sharon Kahn Rudahl was born in 1947, the daughter of Mr and Mrs Norman Kahn. She grew up in Washington D.C., Virginia and Maryland and has lived in Madison, Wisconsin and San Francisco, California. She obtained a BFA, or Bachelor of Fine Arts, from the Cooper Union School of Arts in New York City.

She became aware of social inequalities at an early age both through racism she observed against African Americans and the discrimination she experienced growing up as a Jewish American. In her teens, she began participating in civil rights marches. The focus of her career is social and political activism, primarily through the genre of comics. Early in her career, she contributed to several political publications including the underground paper Kaleidoscope, Takeover, and the San Francisco Express Times (later renamed Good Times). She was also the art editor at Takeover during the 1970s.

In 1969, Olympia Press published her novel Acid Temple Ball, written under the pseudonym of Mary Sativa. An erotic novel that included descriptions of a young woman's sexual experiences under the influence of psychedelic drugs, it has received accolades but has long been out of print.

In the early 1970s, Rudahl was one of the founders of the feminist wing of the underground comix movement. In response to the boy's club nature of the underground comix scene of the early 1970s, she joined the woman's collective that founded Wimmen's Comix, the first ongoing publication drawn exclusively by women. During the underground comix era, her work was featured in Anarchy Comix, Comix Book (Marvel), Wimmen’s Comix, Tits & Clits Comix, and Rip Off Comix.

In 1980, Rudahl wrote her first full-length comic book, Adventures of Crystal Night, first published by Kitchen Sink Press and later reprinted in the anthology Art in Time (2010).

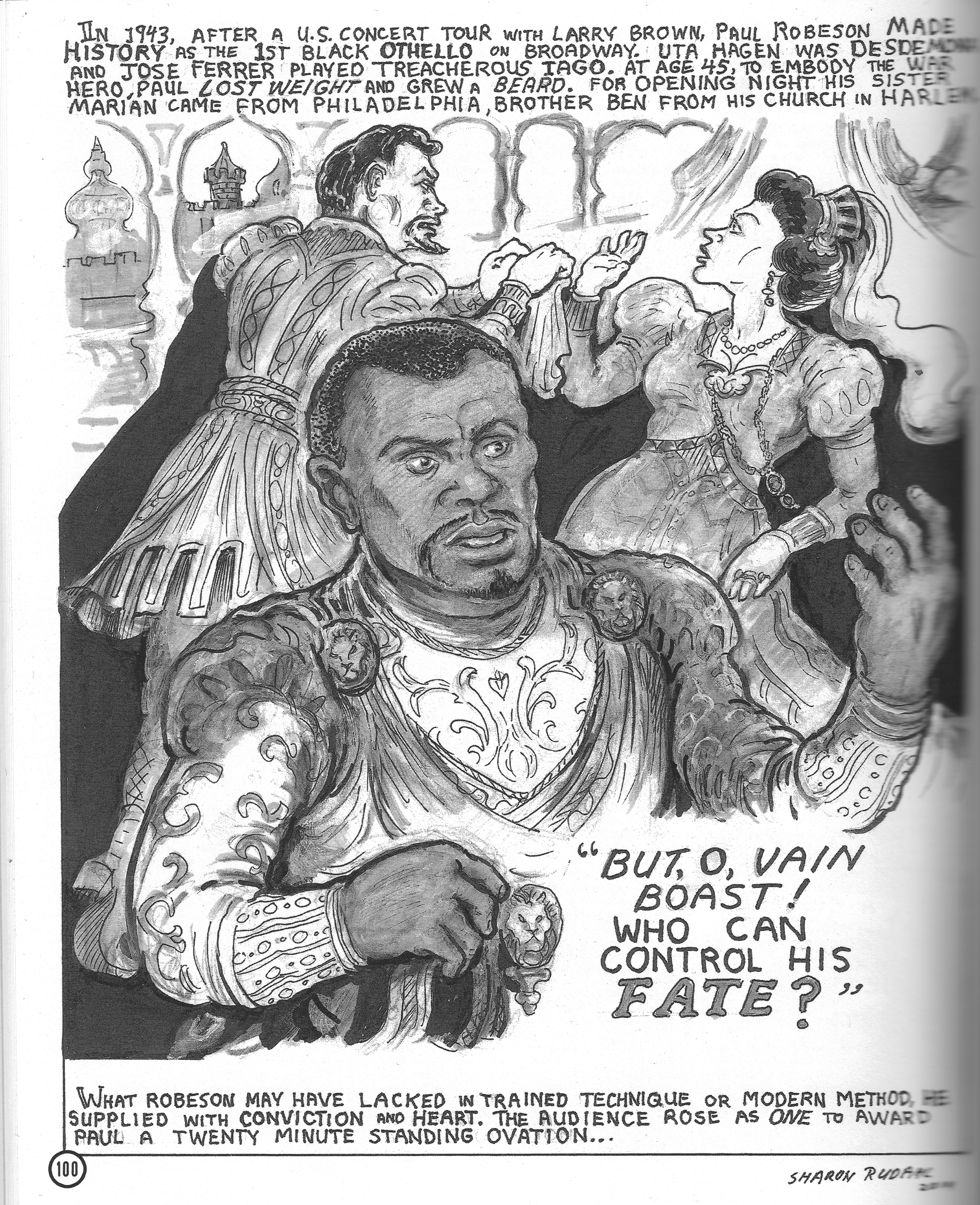
Paul Robeson as Othello in Ballad of an American.

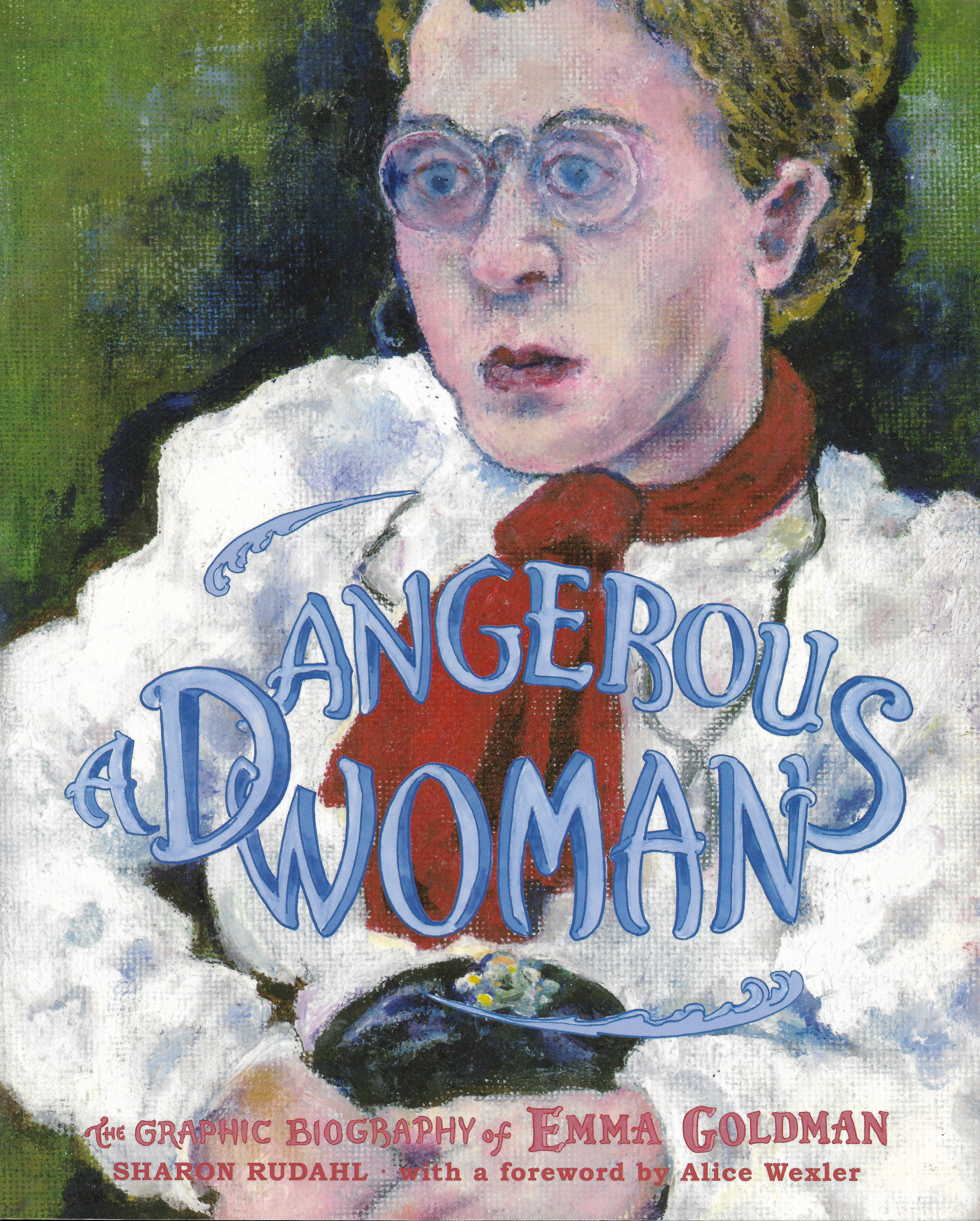
Cover of A Dangerous Woman.

She has written and illustrated two graphic novel biographies, both featuring political activists. The first, A Dangerous Woman: The Graphic Biography of Emma Goldman (2007), explores the life of anarchist political activist and writer Emma Goldman. The second, Ballad of an American: A Graphic Biography of Paul Robeson (2020), is about the life of black activist Paul Robeson.

Rudahl has also contributed to several non-fiction graphic anthologies edited by Paul Buhle, including Wobblies!: A Graphic History of the Industrial Workers of the World (co-edited by Nicole Schulman, 2005), Studs Terkel’s Working: A Graphic Adaptation (adapted by Harvey Pekar, edited by Buhle, 2009), Robin Hood: People's Outlaw and Forest Hero, A Graphic Guide (2011), Yiddishkeit: Jewish Vernacular and the New Land (co-edited with Harvey Pekar, 2011) and Bohemians: A Graphic History (co-edited by David Berger, 2014).

== Selected bibliography ==
- Ballad of an American: A Graphic Biography of Paul Robeson (Rutgers University Press, 2020) - writer and illustrator
- Bohemians: A Graphic History (Verso Books, 2014) - contributor
- Yiddishkeit: Jewish Vernacular and the New Land (Abrams Comicarts, 2011) - contributor
- Robin Hood: People's Outlaw and Forest Hero, A Graphic Guide (PM Press, 2011) - illustrator /contributor
- StudsTerkel’s Working: A Graphic Adaptation (The New Press, 2009) - contributor
- A Dangerous Woman: The Graphic Biography of Emma Goldman (The New Press, 2007) - writer and illustrator
- Wobblies!: A Graphic History of the Industrial Workers of the World (Verso Books, 2005)
- Adventures of Crystal Night (Kitchen Sink Press, 1980) - writer and artist
- Anarchy Comix #3 (Last Gasp, 1981)
- Tits & Clits #6 (Nanny Goat Productions / Last Gasp, 1980) - contributor
- Tits & Clits #5 (Nanny Goat Productions / Last Gasp, 1979) - contributor
- Anarchy Comix #2 (Last Gasp, 1979)
- Wimmen's Comix #1 (Last Gasp, 1972)—founding member and contributor
