= Dickinson (TV series) =

American comedy television series

- Genre: Comedy-drama; Period drama
- Created by: Alena Smith
- Starring: Hailee Steinfeld; Toby Huss; Adrian Blake Enscoe; Anna Baryshnikov; Ella Hunt; Jane Krakowski; Amanda Warren; Chinaza Uche
- Composers: Drum & Lace; Ian Hultquist
- Country of origin: United States
- Original language: English
- No. of seasons: 3
- No. of episodes: 30

Production
- Executive producers: Alena Smith; David Gordon Green (season 1); Michael Sugar; Paul Lee; Hailee Steinfeld; Ashley Zalta; Alex Goldstone; Darlene Hunt
- Producer: Robbie Macdonald
- Running time: 26–34 minutes
- Production companies: Tuning Fork Productions; Sugar 23; wiip; Anonymous Content

Original release
- Network: Apple TV+
- Release: November 1, 2019 – December 24, 2021

Dickinson is an American comedy-drama television series about Emily Dickinson, created by Alena Smith and produced for Apple TV+. Starring Hailee Steinfeld as Emily Dickinson, the series aired for 30 episodes over three seasons from November 1, 2019, to December 24, 2021.

== Premise ==
The series depicts Emily Dickinson's era, focusing on her relationships with her family, her friends, and her society. It explores themes such as gender roles, sexual identity, and artistic expression, while also providing a window into the cultural and political climate of the time.

Dickinson is notable for its use of anachronisms, incorporating modern language, music, and references into its portrayal of historical events and figures.

== Cast and characters ==
=== Main ===
- Hailee Steinfeld as Emily Dickinson, an aspiring poet in love with her best friend Sue, who is also her brother's fiancée. She pushes back against her parents' attempts to find her a suitor.
- Adrian Blake Enscoe as Austin Dickinson, Emily and Lavinia's older brother, recently out of college. He is engaged to Sue Gilbert.
- Anna Baryshnikov as Lavinia "Vinnie" Dickinson, the youngest of the Dickinson siblings; she is upset that her parents are not attempting to find her a suitor. She has her eyes on Joseph Lyman.
- Ella Hunt as Sue Gilbert, Emily's lover and best friend who later marries Austin. She is recently orphaned and lived at a boarding house before moving in with Emily's family, until in later seasons builds the Evergreens, Austin and Sue's house.
- Jane Krakowski as Emily Norcross Dickinson, the mother of Emily, Austin, and Lavinia. She is a housewife with patriarchal views and is upset when her husband hires a maid. In later seasons, she begins to shift to more radical views.
- Toby Huss as Edward Dickinson, the father of Emily, Austin, and Lavinia who holds patriarchal views and disapproves of Emily's writing. He later runs for Congress and defects from the Whig party.
- Amanda Warren as Betty (season 3; recurring season 1; guest season 2), a local dressmaker and Henry's wife with whom she has a daughter.
- Chinaza Uche as Henry (season 3; recurring seasons 1–2), a writer and editor, hired hand of the Dickinson family, and in season 3 joins the U.S. Army with the goal of arming African American soldiers.

=== Recurring ===
- Wiz Khalifa as Death
- Samuel Farnsworth as George Gould, a friend of Austin who is romantically interested in Emily
- Darlene Hunt as Maggie, a maid hired by Edward at the request of Emily
- Gus Birney as Jane Humphrey, the most popular girl in town
- Sophie Zucker as Abby Wood, one of Jane's minions
- Allegra Heart as Abiah Root, one of Jane's minions
- Kevin Yee as Toshiaki, a friend of Jane's
- Gus Halper as Joseph Lyman (season 1), the young man in whom Lavinia is interested
- Jason Mantzoukas as Bee (voice; season 1), one of Emily's hallucinations
- Robert Picardo as Ithamar Conkey, a townsperson who is a close friend of Mr. Dickinson and who attempts to fall in love with Aunt Lavinia
- Matt Lauria as Ben Newton (season 1), a law clerk for Mr. Dickinson
- Jessica Hecht as Aunt Lavinia (seasons 1–2), Emily Norcross Dickinson's sister, and the world-traveling widowed aunt of Emily, Austin, and Lavinia
- Finn Jones as Samuel Bowles (season 2), the editor of the local paper, the Springfield Republican
- Pico Alexander as Henry Shipley (season 2), a new lodger at the Dickinson residence, and a former boyfriend of Lavinia
- Will Pullen as Nobody, and as Frazar Stearns (seasons 2–3), a school friend of Austin's now enrolled at West Point
- Ayo Edebiri as Hattie (season 2), a Dickinson family maid and a spiritual medium
- Gabriel Ebert as Thomas Wentworth Higginson (season 3), an abolitionist activist and colonel in the Union's 1st South Carolina Volunteers

=== Notable guest stars ===
- John Mulaney as Henry David Thoreau (in "Alone, I cannot be", "I felt a Funeral, in my Brain")
- Zosia Mamet as Louisa May Alcott (in "There's a certain Slant of light", "This is My Letter to the World")
- Timothy Simons as Frederick Law Olmsted (in "The Daisy follows soft the Sun")
- Kelli Barrett as Adelaide May (in "Split the Lark")
- Nick Kroll as Edgar Allan Poe (in "I'm Nobody! Who are you?")
- Ziwe as Sojourner Truth (in "The Soul has Bandaged moments", "The Future never spoke")
- Billy Eichner as Walt Whitman (in "This is My Letter to the World")
- Chloe Fineman as Sylvia Plath (in "The Future never spoke")

== Episodes ==
Season	Episodes	Originally released	
Season	Episodes	First released	Last released
1	10	November 1, 2019	
2	10	January 8, 2021	February 26, 2021
3	10	November 5, 2021	December 24, 2021

=== Season 1 (2019) ===
No. overall	No. in season	Title	Directed by	Written by	Original release date
1	1	"Because I could not stop"	David Gordon Green	Alena Smith	November 1, 2019
In 19th century Amherst, Massachusetts, a young Emily Dickinson is tired of her family's attempts to find her a suitor. The latest is a friend of hers, George, who agrees to publish one of Emily's poems. Emily then finds out that her brother Austin proposed to her best friend, Sue. Austin tells his parents his plans to move himself and Sue to Detroit, however his dad wants him to remain in Amherst. Afterwards, Emily and Sue meet and Emily asks Sue to always love her more than Austin and they kiss. George then tells Emily that her poem will be published in the next edition of the magazine, but Emily is afraid of her father's reaction. At dinner, Emily's father announces he plans to run for Congress, Austin announces he and Sue will remain in Amherst, and Emily tells her family about her poem being published. At the latter, Emily's father yells at her about ruining the family name. In her mind, Emily meets with Death and discusses her poems. That night, Emily's father talks about how he doesn't want to lose her and asks her not to marry and move away. Episode title and themes based on "Because I could not stop for Death".
2	2	"I have never seen 'Volcanoes'"	David Gordon Green	Alena Smith & Rachel Axler	November 1, 2019
Emily and Sue lie in bed and discuss the idea of running away together. Emily discovers a lecturer is due to give a presentation on volcanoes but her father is against women getting a higher education. Later, Emily's mother is angry at her husband's decision to get a maid and reveals she feels useless. While shopping for dresses with her sister Vinnie, Emily accidentally spills that Sue got engaged. Afterwards, Emily and Sue decide to dress as men and sneak into the lecture themselves. At the college, George spots them, but agrees to keep their secret. However, partway through the lecture, Emily accidentally gives away that they are there. Her father is angry to discover Emily's actions and tells her to stop her antics. Emily's mother then accuses her of being selfish and not thinking of her father. Emily then asks the maid, Maggie, to teach her to make bread. That night, Emily tells Sue she feels trapped, like the people in Pompeii. Sue then tells her she knows what volcanoes feel like and they proceed to have sex. Episode title and themes based on "I have never seen Volcanoes".
3	3	"Wild nights"	Lynn Shelton	Alena Smith & Ali Waller	November 1, 2019
Emily awakens after having a nightmare about losing Sue. Meanwhile, her parents go to Boston for the night and the kids decide to throw a party. Sue is hesitant about announcing her and Austin's engagement because of her lack of money, but Austin insists on paying all her debts. Vinnie's crush, Joseph, attends, as well as Jane, a former classmate of Emily's who's interested in Austin. George brings opium to the party and Emily shares it with the guests. George asks Emily to dance and talks about marrying Emily, but she tells him to marry a normal girl and they kiss before she runs away with stomach pains. Austin then announces his engagement to Sue before she runs after Emily, who reveals the pains were period pains. Jane reveals her feelings for Austin and questions his marriage to Sue because of Sue and Emily's relationship. Austin walks in on Emily and Sue kissing and Sue reveals she feels suffocated by both of them and intends to go to Boston. Episode title and themes based on "Wild Nights — Wild Nights!".
4	4	"Alone, I cannot be"	Lynn Shelton	Alena Smith	November 1, 2019
With Sue gone to Boston, Emily and Austin are distraught. The town plans to build railroads through Amherst and Emily discovers that her favorite tree is going to be chopped down. After reading Walden, she and George seek out Henry David Thoreau for help. Emily is disappointed to find that he is uninterested in her cause, but her father nevertheless decides to protect her tree on her behalf. Episode title and themes based on "Alone, I cannot be".
5	5	"I am afraid to own a Body"	Silas Howard	Alena Smith & Ken Greller	November 1, 2019
George asks Edward's permission for Emily's hand in marriage and is disappointed when Edward seems to suggest that George is too lenient with Emily. As Emily prepares to act out Othello with her Shakespeare club, George tries to strongarm her into behaving more obediently, first by attempting to censor the play and later by refusing to let Henry, one of the Dickinson's hired hands who is Black, play the title role. Though George later tries to explain his actions, Emily is angered and rejects his marriage proposal outright. Episode title and themes based on "I am afraid to own a Body".
6	6	"A brief, but patient illness"	Silas Howard	Rachel Axler	November 1, 2019
The entire family believes that Emily is on her deathbed, leading both her father and mother to issue gruesome confessions. However, Emily is only feigning sickness in order to stay in her room to read and write poetry. Leaving her room in search of a book she meets her father's clerk, Ben Newton, who is also an avid fan of poetry. After finishing her poem and giving it to Ben, Emily pretends to make a miraculous recovery. She is surprised to encounter Sue, who returned after hearing Emily was on her deathbed. Emily urges Sue to go forward with her marriage to Austin. Lavinia hires an artist to paint a portrait of her. When she is displeased with the results she makes her own attempts to sketch herself. Episode title and themes based on "A brief but patient illness".
7	7	"We lose – because we win"	Stacie Passon	Robbie Macdonald and Alena Smith	November 1, 2019
Edward prepares for election day and is surprised when his supposedly safe seat Congressional seat becomes embroiled in an unexpectedly close race. Ben urges Emily to enter a local poetry contest but Emily refuses, knowing that doing so will embarrass her father. As a compromise, Emily asks Austin to submit "Nobody knows this little Rose" under his name. He does so and wins the contest. Edward realizes that the poem is Emily's and the two have a violent confrontation, which is overheard by Maggie. Edward finally wins his seat but his entire family is too depressed and angry to celebrate his win. Episode title and themes based on "We lose — because we win".
8	8	"There's a certain Slant of light"	Stacie Passon	Hayes Davenport	November 1, 2019
Edward is gone for Christmas and the Dickinsons host a dinner party. Depressed by Edward's departure, Emily's mother takes to her bed leaving the children to act as hosts. Emily invites Ben, and Sue is surprised and jealous as Emily takes up domestic work in order to impress him. On Christmas morning Emily is surprised to learn that her father is building her a conservatory so that she can enjoy flowers year round. Episode title and themes based on "There's a certain Slant of light".
9	9	"'Faith' is a fine invention"	Patrick Norris	Darlene Hunt	November 1, 2019
Emily makes plans to go see a solar eclipse with Ben, who is very sick. During the eclipse the two "anti-marry" each other, promising to remain unwed for as long as they live. When his coughing grows worse Emily nurses him at the Dickinson family home and is disturbed when he begins to hallucinate. Sue is fitted for her wedding dress and discovers she is pregnant, much to her chagrin. Lavinia gives Joseph a nude sketch of herself. Episode title and themes based on "Faith is a fine invention".
10	10	"I felt a Funeral, in my Brain"	Patrick Norris	Alena Smith & Ali Waller	November 1, 2019
Austin and Sue's marriage day arrives. Emily is still in mourning over Ben's death but tries to make Sue's wedding day special by writing her the love poem "One Sister have I in our house" and gathering a bouquet for her. Her actions reignite Austin's jealousy, and he bans her from the wedding and tells the family that it was Emily who decided not to come. George leaves town to seek his fortune in California and offers to take Emily with him, but she refuses citing her desire to remain with Sue. Edward finally returns. Episode title and themes based on "I felt a Funeral, in my Brain".

=== Season 2 (2021) ===
No. overall	No. in season	Title	Directed by	Written by	Original release date
11	1	"Before I got my eye put out"	Christopher Storer	Alena Smith	January 8, 2021
Emily experiences hallucinations of a man who identifies himself as Nobody and struggles with her vision though she is more inspired than ever. The Dickinsons struggle with their finances as Emily's father tries to support Austin and Sue's lavish spending. Sue, after suffering through a miscarriage, loses herself in becoming a well-to-do influencer. Hoping to help Emily be published she introduces her to editor Samuel Bowles. When Sue calls on Emily to recite a poem for Bowles, she hallucinates 'Nobody' instead and is unable to do so. Bowles is not put off and is instead intrigued. Episode title and themes based on "Before I got my eye put out".
12	2	"Fame is a fickle food"	Christopher Storer	Rachel Axler	January 8, 2021
After coming in second in the baking contest the previous year, Emily is obsessed with winning the Amherst Cattle Show Baking Contest. After she wins she learns her recipe will be published in the newspaper. Sue uses the win to push Emily further towards the publication of her poems. Samuel Bowles and Emily start an intriguing friendship and she shares a poem with him. Austin, unaware of Sue's previous miscarriage, asks her to consider having a child with him. Episode title and themes based on "Fame is a fickle food".
13	3	"The only Ghost I ever saw"	Rosemary Rodriguez	Alena Smith & Sophie Zucker	January 8, 2021
Conflicted over whether to publish or not Emily has a seance and then hallucinates once more over the man who calls himself 'Nobody'. She makes a final decision over whether to publish or not. To fix their money problems Emily's father has his wealthy orphaned nieces come to live with them, much to his wife's chagrin. Episode title and themes based on "The only Ghost I ever saw".
14	4	"The Daisy follows soft the Sun"	Rosemary Rodriguez	Robbie Macdonald	January 15, 2021
Emily fears she may have lost her artistic vision and become overreliant on Samuel Bowles' opinion of her work. Lavinia is pressured into accepting an offer of marriage from Ship after an elaborate proposal. Austin, desperate to be a father, adopts the Newton girls, much to Sue's displeasure. Episode title and themes based on "The Daisy follows soft the Sun".
15	5	"Forbidden Fruit a flavor has"	Silas Howard	Ken Greller	January 22, 2021
As Emily prepares for publication she learns that Samuel has a reputation for seducing the women he publishes and that everyone believes they have been intimate. Austin helps Henry have meetings in his barn for his group of abolitionists and brings them a printing press. Emily writes to Sam's wife, Mary. Lavinia seduces Ship to prove that she can be as crazy as Lola Montez. Episode title and themes based on "Forbidden Fruit a flavor has".
16	6	"Split the lark"	Silas Howard	Alena Smith	January 29, 2021
The Dickinsons attend the opera where Emily, nursing a budding crush on Sam, is excited to end up in his private box upon Sue's suggestion. However her dreams are dashed when Sam confronts her with the letter she wrote his wife, which made both of them uncomfortable. Emily meets Adelaide backstage and tells her that she wants to be famous but is taken aback when Adelaide warns her about what that could mean. Episode title and themes based on "Split the Lark — and you'll find the Music".
17	7	"Forever – is composed of Nows"	Stacie Passon	Yael Green	February 5, 2021
The Dickinson women along with Aunt Lavinia head to a spa where Emily has a good moment with her mother. Emily frets about not being published but Sam assures her that he is only waiting for the right time to make her poem front page. She then gives him all of her poems. Austin is frustrated with Sue and finds comfort with Jane. Betty worries about her family as Henry's writing brought forth death threats from the South. Episode title and themes based on "Forever — is composed of Nows".
18	8	"I'm Nobody! Who are you?"	Stacie Passon	Alena Smith & Ayo Edebiri	February 12, 2021
Emily's poem, "I taste a liquor never brewed", is finally published in The Springfield Republican. However she realizes that she's invisible and spends the day spying on people's reactions to her work. Depressed with what she finds, Emily skips Sue's salon celebrating her publication and instead finds comfort witnessing Henry's celebration of his efforts with the abolitionist paper, The Constellation. Later, returning to Sue and Austin's home she discovers Sue's affair with Sam. Episode title and themes based on "I'm Nobody! Who are you?".
19	9	"I Like a Look of Agony"	Silas Howard	Robbie Macdonald	February 19, 2021
Sue goes to visit her old friend Mary Bowles, Sam's wife. Austin holds a tea party in the meantime, gathering his friends for one last hurrah as rumors of a civil war begin. After the publication of her poem Emily finally decides to make herself known and is disturbed when she meets one of Austin's guests. Austin is upset about Sue and Emily comforts him. Episode title and themes based on "I like a look of Agony".
20	10	"You cannot put a Fire out"	Silas Howard	Alena Smith	February 26, 2021
Emily tries to retrieve her poems from Sam but hits a snag when she finds out he is determined to publish them and make her a literary star. Maggie manages to steal them back for her. Jane's child is christened and Austin is the godfather. Ship wants to move to New Orleans and Lavinia breaks up with him since she does not want to move south when there will be a civil war soon. Sue leaves the christening and finds Emily. She declares her love for Emily and they make out. Emily tells her that she writes for Sue and that is enough for her. Sue says that she will never let go of Emily again. Episode title and themes based on "You cannot put a Fire out".

=== Season 3 (2021) ===
No. overall	No. in season	Title	Directed by	Written by	Original release date
21	1	"“Hope” is the thing with feathers"	Silas Howard	Alena Smith	November 5, 2021
As the civil war rages on the Dickinson family is devastated by the death of their maternal aunt Lavinia. Emily however is inspired by her aunt's death and pledges to take better care of her family. However an embittered Austin has drawn away from his family and become a drunkard and a playboy despite the fact that Sue is heavily pregnant. During a family dinner, a drunk Austin lashes out at Edward, who has a heart attack. Episode title and themes based on ""Hope" is the thing with feathers".
22	2	"It feels a shame to be Alive -"	Silas Howard	Robbie MacDonald	November 5, 2021
In the wake of their father's heart attack, all the Dickinson children have different reactions with Lavinia and Austin questioning the control he has exercised over their lives. Lavinia is unhappy with her self imposed spinsterhood. Sue goes into labor and Emily, her mother and Maggie help to midwife the child into the world. Jane tells Austin she is marrying a wealthy man and moving to Vietnam. Episode title and themes based on "It feels a shame to be Alive".
23	3	"The Soul has Bandaged moments"	Rachael Holder	Sophie Zucker	November 5, 2021
Determined to heal the nation, Emily and Lavinia host a sewing circle to support the troops with help from Amherst's finest seamstress, Betty. Sue has a difficult time with the baby and wants Emily. Edward harbors no ill will towards Austin but Austin refuses to reconcile. Emily writes to Thomas Wentworth Higginson. Episode title and themes based on "The Soul has Bandaged moments".
24	4	"This is my letter to the World"	Rachael Holder	Ken Greller & R. Eric Thomas	November 12, 2021
Emily reads the works of Walt Whitman and contemplates what it means to participate fully in the world. Henry reaches the war in the South and is placed with a group of Gullah soldiers where his job is to teach them to read and write. He is shocked at their extremely poor treatment. Episode title and themes based on "This is my letter to the World".
25	5	"Sang from the Heart, Sire"	Keith Powell	Alena Smith & Francis Weiss Rabkin	November 19, 2021
For Edward's birthday, Emily organizes a sing-a-long with members of her family with Sue being surprisingly willing to go even though Austin will not. Emily is thrilled when Austin makes a surprise appearance but is crestfallen when Austin reveals he plans to split business ties with his father and divorce Sue. Meanwhile Sue becomes upset when she learns that despite Emily swearing that she is the only opinion that matters to her, she has been secretly reaching out to outside editors. Episode title and themes based on "Sang from the Heart, Sire,".
26	6	"A little Madness in the Spring"	Silas Howard	Ayo Edebiri	November 25, 2021
Edward receives an offer to be on the board of an insane asylum. Emily, Lavinia, and their mother go with him on a tour to support him but Mrs. Dickinson becomes terrified that due to her ongoing grief over the death of her sister, Edward plans to commit her. Surprisingly during the tour Edward learns that the head of the asylum wants to commit Emily. Meanwhile still estranged from the rest of the Dickinsons, Austin and Sue manage to reconcile and achieve some peace in their unconventional marriage by getting rid of gender roles in parenting. Episode title and themes based on "A little Madness in the Spring".
27	7	"The Future never spoke"	Heather Jack	Ziwe & Alena Smith	December 3, 2021
After a clash with Sue, Emily wishes she could escape from this troubled time altogether. She glimpses into the 20th century and is shocked by the changes. She learns that Vinnie publishes her poems after her death from Sylvia Plath. Henry pleads with Higginson to arm the soldiers in the face of an advancing confederate army. Austin struggles with a man's responsibility in wartime and considers draft dodging to take care of his son. Episode title and themes based on "The Future — never spoke —".
28	8	"My life had stood - a loaded gun -"	Heather Jack	Robbie MacDonald	December 10, 2021
On the day of a Frazer's memorial, Emily struggles to reunite with Austin. Her efforts to keep her family's hope alive reach a breaking point when she learns that her father plans on leaving everything to Austin despite what happened between them since he does not believe women should be independent. Sue gives an anonymous submission to the Union Army Newsletter. Emily descends into a personal inferno. Episode title and themes based on "My Life had stood — a Loaded Gun —".
29	9	"Grief is a Mouse"	Laura Terruso	Ken Greller	December 17, 2021
Emily takes steps to ensure that her family won't repeat their past mistakes and reconciles with Austin. Her mother comes to terms with Aunt Lavinia's death. The Massachusetts Republican Party nominates Edward for lieutenant governor. Higginson promotes Henry to Sergeant and takes a break from war. The Amherst gang gathers for a fond farewell. Emily reads out her published poem submitted by Sue, and they have sex after. Episode title and themes based on "Grief is a Mouse".
30	10	"This was a Poet -"	Alena Smith	Alena Smith & R. Eric Thomas	December 24, 2021
Emily asks Betty to help her design a new dress. Austin and Sue reconcile with Edward and they decide to work on a case together. They name their baby after him. The Dickinson family is surprised by an unexpected guest. Higginson informs Betty about Henry's whereabouts and returns his diary. Emily sees no need to leave her room. Episode title and themes based on "This was a Poet — It is That".

== Production ==
=== Development ===
On May 30, 2018, it was announced that Apple had given the production a straight-to-series order. The series would be written by Alena Smith who was also set to executive produce alongside Paul Lee, David Gordon Green, Michael Sugar, Ashley Zalta, Alex Goldstone, and Darlene Hunt and Hailee Steinfeld. Green was also expected to direct as well. Production companies involved with the series included wiip and Anonymous Content. In October 2019, The Hollywood Reporter reported Dickinson had been renewed for a second season. In October 2020, the series was renewed for a third season, ahead of the premiere of the second season. In September 2021, it was announced that the third season would be its last and would premiere on November 5, 2021.

=== Casting ===
Alongside the initial series announcement, it was confirmed that Hailee Steinfeld would star as Emily Dickinson. On August 29, 2018, it was announced that Jane Krakowski had been cast in a starring role. On September 26, 2018, it was announced that Toby Huss, Anna Baryshnikov, Ella Hunt and Adrian Enscoe had been cast as series regulars. On January 29, 2019, it was reported that Matt Lauria had joined the cast in a recurring capacity. In September 2019, it was announced Wiz Khalifa and John Mulaney had joined the cast of the series. In December 2019, it was announced that Finn Jones and Pico Alexander had been cast in the series. Jones plays Samuel Bowles, a newspaper editor, while Alexander plays Henry "Ship" Shipley, a dropout and boarder of the Dickinson's. Actors Will Poulter and Joe Thomas were considered for the role of Bowles.

=== Filming ===
Principal photography for the series commenced on January 7, 2019, in Old Bethpage, New York. In March 2019, it was reported by The New York Times that filming had concluded. In November 2019, Steinfeld confirmed that filming for season two was underway and had been for several months. Filming for season three began on March 17, 2021 and concluded on June 15, 2021

Some scenes were filmed at Kaufman Astoria Studios in Queens, New York. Many scenes from Season 3 were filmed at the Jay Estate in Rye, New York.

== Reception ==
Critical response of Dickinson
Season	Rotten Tomatoes	Metacritic
1	76% (67 reviews)	66 (29 reviews)
2	100% (26 reviews)	81 (9 reviews)
3	100% (23 reviews)	91 (6 reviews)

=== Season 1 ===
The first season of Dickinson received generally positive reviews. It holds an approval rating of 76% on Rotten Tomatoes based on 67 reviews, and an average rating of 6.5/10. The website's critical consensus reads, "Audacious and aspirational, Dickinson's bold blend of period-drama and millennial milieu definitely won't be for all, but those looking to break free from the doldrums of their viewing life may find some kind of hope in its singular vision." On Metacritic, which uses a weighted average, the first season has a score of 66 out of 100 based on 29 critics.

=== Season 2 ===
The second season received universal acclaim. On Rotten Tomatoes, it holds an 100% approval rating based on 26 reviews, with an average rating of 8.3/10. The website's critical consensus reads, "With stronger writing and a never-better Hailee Steinfeld, Dickinson finds surer footing in its second season without losing any of its strange delights." On Metacritic, the second season has a score of 81 out of 100 based on 9 critics.

=== Season 3 ===
The third and final season also received universal acclaim. On Rotten Tomatoes, it holds a 100% approval rating based on 23 reviews, with an average rating of 8.3/10. The website's critical consensus reads, "Authentically itself to the very last, Dickinson's final season delivers elegant closure like a well-structured stanza." On Metacritic, the third season has a score of 91 out of 100 based on 6 critics.

=== Accolades ===
Dickinson won a Peabody Award in the Entertainment category, making it the first show from Apple TV+ to win the prestigious honor.

Year	Award	Category	Nominee(s)	Result	Ref.
2019	Peabody Awards	Entertainment	Dickinson	Won	
2020	GLAAD Media Awards	Outstanding Comedy Series	Dickinson	Nominated	
2021	Hollywood Critics Association TV Awards	Best Actress in a Streaming Series, Comedy	Hailee Steinfeld	Nominated	
2021	Set Decorators Society of America Awards	Best Achievement in Decor/Design of a Half-Hour Single-Camera Series	Marina Parker, Neil Patel and Loren Weeks	Nominated	
2022	GLAAD Media Awards	Outstanding Comedy Series	Dickinson	Nominated	
2022	Hollywood Critics Association TV Awards	Best Streaming Series, Comedy	Dickinson	Nominated	
2022	Set Decorators Society of America Awards	Best Achievement in Décor/Design of a Half-Hour Single-Camera Series	Marina Parker and Neil Patel	Nominated	

=== Audience viewership ===
Dickinson broke through Parrot Analytics' top 10 most in-demand original streaming shows for the week of November 6, 2019 to November 12, 2019.
