= The Graphic Canon =

The Graphic Canon: The World's Great Literature as Comics and Visuals (Seven Stories Press) is a three-volume anthology, edited by Russ Kick, that renders some of the world's greatest and most famous literature into graphic-novel form. The first two volumes were released in 2012, and the concluding volume was published in spring 2013.

== Reception ==
NPR declared: "It's easily the most ambitious and successfully realized literary project in recent memory, and certainly the one that's most relevant for today's readers." In a full-page review, The New York Times Sunday Book Review concluded: "What [editor Russ Kick] asks us to acknowledge with The Graphic Canon is this: Gulliver’s Travels, Wuthering Heights, Leaves of Grass — these works of literature do not reside just on the shelves of academia; they flourish in the eye of our imagination.” The following week, it was named an "Editors' Choice" in the NY Times Sunday Book Review.

Publishers Weekly called it "a must-have anthology," Library Journal said it's "an exciting new benchmark for comics," Booklist dubbed it "a uniquely powerful piece of art," and School Library Journal declared it "startlingly brilliant" and "a masterpiece of literary choices as well as art and interpretation."

== The Graphic Canon, Volume 1 ==
First edition

Volume 1: From the Epic of Gilgamesh to Shakespeare to Dangerous Liaisons, published May 2012, features 55 classic works of literature, going from the earliest, ancient literature until the end of the 1700s. Some of the artists include Robert Crumb, Will Eisner, Molly Crabapple, Rick Geary, and Seymour Chwast.

=== Featured works ===
- The Epic of Gilgamesh
- "Coyote and the Pebbles"
- The Iliad and The Odyssey by Homer
- Poem Fragments from Sappho
- Medea by Euripides
- Lysistrata by Aristophanes
- Plato's Symposium
- The Book of Esther
- Tao Te Ching by Lao Tzu
- Mahabharata by Vyasa
- The Analects and Other Writings by Confucius
- The Book of Daniel
- On the Nature of Things by Lucretius
- Aeneid by Virgil
- The Book of Revelation
- Three Tang Poems: "Frontier Song" by Wang Han, "A Village South of the Capital" by Cui Hu, and "Drinking Alone Beneath the Moon" by Li Bai
- Beowulf
- The Tale of Genji by Murasaki Shikibu
- The Letters of Heloise and Abelard
- "O Nobilissima Viriditas" by Hildegard of Bingen
- "The Fisherman and the Genie" and "The Woman with Two Coyntes" from The Arabian Nights
- Poems from Rumi
- The Divine Comedy and The Inferno by Dante Alighieri
- The Tibetan Book of the Dead by Padmasambhava and Karma Lingpa
- The Canterbury Tales by Geoffrey Chaucer
- "The Last Ballad" by François Villon
- Le Morte d'Arthur by Sir Thomas Malory
- Apu Ollantay
- Hagoromo
- Outlaws of the Water Margin by Shi Nai'an
- Popol Vuh
- The Visions of St. Teresa of Avila
- "Hot Sun, Cool Fire" by George Peele
- Journey to the West by Wu Cheng'en
- The Faerie Queene by Edmund Spenser
- A Midsummer Night's Dream, King Lear, Hamlet, "Sonnet 18", and "Sonnet 20" by William Shakespeare
- Don Quixote by Miguel de Cervantes
- "The Flea" by John Donne
- "To His Coy Mistress" by Andrew Marvell
- Paradise Lost by John Milton
- "Forgive Us Our Trespasses" by Aphra Behn
- Gulliver's Travels and "A Modest Proposal" by Jonathan Swift
- "Advice to a Young Man on the Choice of a Mistress" and "Letter to the Royal Academy of Brussels" (A.K.A. "Fart Proudly") by Benjamin Franklin
- Candide by Voltaire
- London Journal by James Boswell
- A Vindication of the Rights of Women by Mary Wollstonecraft
- Dangerous Liaisons by Choderlos de Laclos

== The Graphic Canon, Volume 2 ==
First edition

Volume 2: From "Kubla Khan" to the Brontë Sisters to The Picture of Dorian Gray, published October 2012, continues chronologically by featuring 51 of the great, classic works of the 19th century. A few of the artists include Maxon Crumb, Gris Grimly, Hunt Emerson, John Porcellino, John Coulthart, Dame Darcy, S. Clay Wilson, and Seth Tobocman.

=== Featured works ===
- Moby-Dick by Herman Melville
- Adventures of Huckleberry Finn by Mark Twain
- "Kubla Khan" by Samuel Taylor Coleridge
- "The Rime of the Ancient Mariner"
- "Auguries of Innocence" and Jerusalem: The Emanation of the Giant Albion by William Blake
- "I Wandered Lonely as a Cloud" by William Wordsworth
- "She Walks in Beauty" by Lord Byron
- "O Solitude" and "La Belle Dame sans Merci" by John Keats
- "Ozymandias" by Percy Bysshe Shelley
- "Snow White and the Seven Dwarves", "The Valiant Little Tailor", "Hansel and Gretel", and "How Six Made Good in the World" by the Brothers Grimm
- Thus Spoke Zarathustra by Friedrich Nietzsche
- On the Origin of Species by Charles Darwin
- Frankenstein and "The Mortal Immortal" by Mary Shelley
- Les Misérables by Victor Hugo
- The Confessions of Nat Turner by Nat Turner and Thomas R. Gray
- "The Emperor's New Clothes", "The Little Match Girl", "The Nightingale" by Hans Christian Andersen
- "Jenny Kiss'd Me" by Leigh Hunt
- "The Jumblies" by Edward Lear
- "The Tell-Tale Heart", "The Raven", "The Pit and the Pendulum", "the Bells", and "The Masque of the Red Death" by Edgar Allan Poe
- Jane Eyre by Charlotte Brontë
- Wuthering Heights by Emily Brontë
- The Scarlet Letter by Nathaniel Hawthorne
- "The Message from Mount Misery" by Frederick Douglass
- "Because I could not stop for Death" and "I taste a liquor never brewed" by Emily Dickinson
- "Letter to George Sand" by Gustave Flaubert
- Middlemarch by George Eliot
- Anna Karenina by Leo Tolstoy
- Crime and Punishment by Fyodor Dostoevsky
- Walden by Henry David Thoreau
- "Le Bateau ivre" by Arthur Rimbaud
- Leaves of Grass by Walt Whitman
- The Picture of Dorian Gray by Oscar Wilde
- Pride and Prejudice by Jane Austen
- Alice's Adventures in Wonderland, Through the Looking-Glass, and The Hunting of the Snark by Lewis Carroll
- Venus in Furs by Leopold von Sacher-Masoch
- The Hasheesh Eater by Fitz Hugh Ludlow
- Der Struwwelpeter by Heinrich Hoffmann
- Oliver Twist by Charles Dickens
- Strange Case of Dr. Jekyll and Mr. Hyde by Robert Louis Stevenson
- "Goblin Market" by Christina Rossetti
- "An Occurrence at Owl Creek Bridge" by Ambrose Bierce
- "The Picture of Dorian Gray" a 10-page collage adaptation by John Coulthart

== The Graphic Canon, Volume 3 ==
First edition

Volume 3: From Heart of Darkness to Hemingway to Infinite Jest (March 2013) begins with three great works from 1899 and continues with 77 works from the twentieth century, ending in 1996. Featured artists include Robert Crumb, Dame Darcy, Ted Rall, Milton Knight, and Tara Seibel, among many others.

=== Featured works ===
- Heart of Darkness by Joseph Conrad
- Naked Lunch by William S. Burroughs
- Letters to a Young Poet by Rainer Maria Rilke
- The Man with the Golden Arm by Nelson Algren
- "The Love Song of J. Alfred Prufrock" and "The Waste Land" by T. S. Eliot
- "The Second Coming" by W. B. Yeats
- The Voyage Out by Virginia Woolf
- Ulysses and "Araby" from Dubliners by James Joyce
- Lolita by Vladimir Nabokov
- The Age of Innocence by Edith Wharton
- Siddhartha and Steppenwolf by Hermann Hesse
- "The Negro Speaks of Rivers" by Langston Hughes
- One Flew Over the Cuckoo's Nest by Ken Kesey
- Last Exit to Brooklyn by Hubert Selby, Jr.
- Crash by J. G. Ballard
- Animal Farm and Nineteen Eighty-Four by George Orwell
- The Wonderful Wizard of Oz by L. Frank Baum
- Brave New World and The Doors of Perception by Aldous Huxley
- Waiting for Godot by Samuel Beckett
- One Hundred Years of Solitude by Gabriel García Márquez
- The Bell Jar by Sylvia Plath
- On the Road by Jack Kerouac
- The Wind-Up Bird Chronicle by Haruki Murakami
- Nausea by Jean-Paul Sartre
- Blood Meridian by Cormac McCarthy
- The Great Gatsby by F. Scott Fitzgerald
- The Awakening by Kate Chopin
- The Interpretation of Dreams by Sigmund Freud
- The New Accelerator by H. G. Wells
- "Reginald" by Saki
- "Mother" by Maxim Gorky
- "If—" by Rudyard Kipling
- "John Barleycorn" by Jack London
- "The Metamorphosis", "The Top", and "Give It Up!" by Franz Kafka
- "The Mowers" and "Lady Chatterley's Lover" by D. H. Lawrence
- "Sea Iris" by H.D.
- "A Matter of Colour" and "Living on $1,000 a Year in Paris" by Ernest Hemingway
- "The Madman" by Kahlil Gibran
- "Hands" from Winesburg, Ohio by Sherwood Anderson
- "The Dreaming of Bones" by W. B. Yeats
- "Cheri' by Colette
- "Dulce et Decorum est" by Wilfred Owen
- "The Sound and the Fury" and "The Hill" by William Faulkner
- "The Maltese Falcon" by Dashiell Hammett
- "Poker!" by Zora Neale Hurston
- "Black Elk Speaks" by Black Elk and John G. Neihardt
- "Strange Fruit" by Lewis Allan
- "The Grapes of Wrath" by John Steinbeck
- "The Pertinent" and "The Singing-Woman from the Wood's Edge" by Edna St. Vincent Millay
- "Rain" by W. Somerset Maugham
- "The Emperor of Ice-Cream" by Wallace Stevens
- "Three stories" by Jorge Luis Borges
- "The Stranger" by Albert Camus
- "The Heart of the Park" by Flannery O'Connor
- "The Voice of the Hamster" and "Gravity's Rainbow" by Thomas Pynchon
- "The Dancer" by Gabriela Mistral
- "Lord of the Flies" by William Golding
- "Diaries" by Anaïs Nin
- "Four Beats" Graphic Biographies by Tara Seibel
- "The Master and Margarita" by Mikhail Bulgakov
- "In Watermelon Sugar" by Richard Brautigan
- "I Bought a Little City" by Donald Barthelme
- "What We Talk About When We Talk About Love" by Raymond Carver
- "Blood and Guts in High School" by Kathy Acker
- "Foucault's Pendulum" by Umberto Eco
- "Wild at Heart" by Barry Gifford
- "The Famished Road" by Ben Okri
- "Einstein's Dreams" by Alan Lightman
- "Infinite Jest" by David Foster Wallace
