= The God Machine =

The God Machine may refer to:

- The God Machine (novel), a 1968 novel by Martin Caidin
- The God Machine (band), a US/UK rock band
- The God Machine (comedic prop), a comedic prop featured in the "This Week in God" segments on The Daily Show with Jon Stewart
- The God Machine (comics), a 2008 comic book series from Archaia Studios Press
- The God Machine, a 2009 novel by J. G. Sandom
- The God Machine, a 1973 novel by William John Watkins
- The God-Machine Chronicle, a sourcebook for the World of Darkness role-playing games
- "God Machine", a song by Acid Bath from When the Kite String Pops
- The God Machine (album), a studio album by the German power metal band Blind Guardian, released in September 2022
- Thegodmachine, a studio album by the American metalcore band Phinehas, released in September 2011

== See also ==
- Deus ex machina, a plot device that originated in the drama of Ancient Greece
- God helmet, an experimental apparatus developed by Stanley Koren and Michael Persinger
