= Chandra Free =

American novelist (born 1981)

- Free at Dragon Con in 2026
- Born: December 25, 1981 (age 44); Orlando, Florida, U.S.
- Occupations: Cartoonist; comic book artist; writer; storyboard artist
- Writing career
- Pen name: Spooky Chan
- Period: 2006–present
- Genre: Comic books
- Website: spookychan.com

Chandra Free (born December 25, 1981) is an American illustrator and creator/writer of the comic book The God Machine, published by Archaia Entertainment and co-founder of publisher, Machina Corpse. Her work in comics includes Mice Templar, Graphic Canon vol 3 and vol 4 , Jim Henson's Fraggle Rock volume 2 for Archaia Entertainment, Sullengrey and the illustrated novel, Conspiracy of the Planet of the Apes. Outside of comics she as work on storyboards for 321 Launch, cinematic storyboards for the movie The Monkey King, and character designs for an animated pilot, HG Chicken and the Chronological Order.

== Personal life ==
Chandra Free was born in Orlando, Florida. Today she lives in Brooklyn, New York. She is an avid fan of The Venture Bros., Mystery Science Theater 3000, classic video games, independent comics, and goth subculture. She is also a LGBTQAI+ ally.

== Comics ==
=== Creator owned ===
- The God Machine (Volume #1: 2010) Archaia Entertainment

=== Artist ===
- Fraggle Rock Volume 2 Archaia Entertainment
- John Carpenter's Tales For A Halloween Night (Volume 5) Storm King Productions
- Odie (Issue #2) Small Scale Press
- Modern Dread – A Horror Anthology of Modern Anxieties Space Between Entertainment
- PSYCHOPOMP: BUNNY LOVE GutterGlitter
- Graphic Canon (Volume 3) "The Wasteland" Seven Stories Press
- Graphic Canon (Volume 4) Seven Stories Press

=== Cover Artist ===
- Halloween Man: Hallowtide #1 Sugar Skull Media
- Halloween Man: Hallowtide #2 Sugar Skull Medi

=== Colorist ===
- Mice Templar (Volumes 4–5) (Alternate Covers) Image Comics
- Sullengrey: Sacrifice #1 Ape Entertainment
- Sullengrey: Cemetery Things Ape Entertainment
- The Darkgoodby] Vol. 2(Cover) Tokyopop

== Not Comics ==
=== Misc ===
- BLAM! Ventures LLC (Book Packager); Art Director 2010-2015
- SPACE:1999 Aftershock & Awe Archaia Entertainment; Continuity Director, Touch Up Artist
- The Monkey King Untitled Video Game (Illustrator) Global Star Productions

=== Storyboard Artist ===
- 321 Launch (Company); Storyboard Colorist
- Monkey King

=== Illustration ===
- SYFY/DeviantArt: It's a Fan Thing Campaign
- Conspiracy of the Planet of the Apes Archaia Entertainment
- Faye Wayward Raven Press
- Krampus Song by Miss FD Music Video, Quantum Release Records - Illustrator (credited as SpookyChan Productions)
