= Jewish Review of Books =

American magazine

- Editor: Abraham Socher
- Frequency: Quarterly
- Founded: 2010
- Country: United States
- Based in: Cleveland Heights, Ohio
- Language: English
- Website: www.jewishreviewofbooks.com
- ISSN: 2153-1978

The Jewish Review of Books is a quarterly magazine with articles on literature, culture and current affairs from a Jewish perspective. It is published in Cleveland Heights, Ohio.

The magazine was launched in 2010 with an editorial board that included Michael Walzer, Ruth Wisse, Shlomo Avineri, Ruth Gavison, and other prominent Jewish thinkers. The editor is Abraham Socher. The initial press run was 30,000 copies. According to The Jewish Week, the JRB is "unabashedly" modeled after The New York Review of Books. Harvey Pekar and Tara Seibel collaborated on comic strips for its first two issues.

The magazine was initially funded by the Tikvah Fund, founded by Zalman Bernstein. In 2022, the publication separated from the Tikvah Fund. It is now run independently under the nonprofit Jewish Review of Books Foundation, chaired by Jehuda Reinharz, with the Mandel Foundation providing the majority of the funding.

Contributors have included Robert Alter, Elisheva Carlebach, David Ellenson, Daniel Gordis, Moshe Halbertal, Shai Held, Susannah Heschel, Dara Horn, Adam Kirsch, Jonathan Sacks, Haym Soloveitchik, David Wolpe, and Steven Zipperstein.
