= Tara Seibel =

American cartoonist

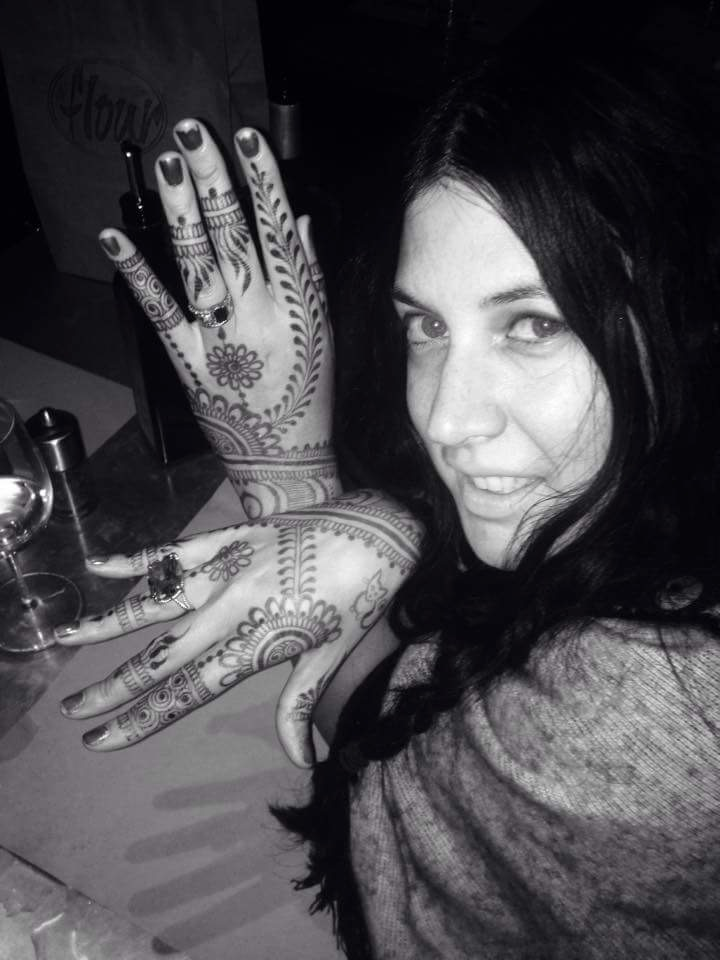
- Tara Seibel in Cleveland's Little Italy
- Born: Tara Murphy; February 4, 1973 (age 53) Cleveland, Ohio
- Areas: Artist, cartoonist, illustrator, designer
- Notable works: adaptation of "The Great Gatsby" Graphic Canon, Seven Stories Press
- Spouse: Aaron Seibel
- Children: 3

Tara Seibel (born February 4, 1973) is an American cartoonist, graphic designer and illustrator from Cleveland. Her work has been published in Chicago Newcity, Funny Times, The Austin Chronicle, Cleveland Scene, Heeb Magazine, SMITH Magazine, Mineshaft Magazine, Juxtapoz, Jewish Review of Books, Cleveland Free Times, USA Today, US Catholic, The New York Times, Los Angeles Times and The Paris Review.

== Early life and education ==
Tara Seibel was born Tara Murphy in Cleveland, Ohio, to Lauren Murphy (née Gieseler) and Robert Murphy. Seibel grew up in Wickliffe, Ohio. Seibel is the oldest of three siblings: Lauren Murphy-Holder, a psychologist,and Robert Murphy Jr. a businessman. Tara's grandfather, Richard Gieseler, was a foreman for the Cleveland Twist Drill Company, and met his wife Dorothea (née Newman) on the job. Her other grandfather, John "Buck" Buchan, was a local musician who played with "Cleveland's Polka King" Frankie Yankovic and comedian-musician Mickey Katz. Her mother was a homemaker and helped manage the family business.

Tara's father (now deceased) was a business owner and politician, as well a local talk show radio host. Tara was a frequent guest and would talk politics with her dad as the "liberal daughter". Tara started drawing political cartoons for her father's campaigns and various newsletters at a young age.

Seibel was a high school majorette, twirled fire on the field, and lettered in varsity track and field for the high jump. She played the xylophone and wrote for the school paper.

Seibel earned a Bachelor of Fine Arts degree after majoring in Applied Media Arts at Edinboro University of Pennsylvania, where she studied drawing, painting, documentary film, illustration, animation, journalism, photography and graphic design. Seibel's first printed piece was a poster design for the Edinboro University Alternative Film Festival. She completed this accredited project during an internship at Murphy Design on East 40th Street in Cleveland.

== Career ==
Seibel began her professional artistic career in Chicago, illustrating covers for restaurant menus and food packaging. One of the first menus she designed was for Michael Jordan The Restaurant. Eventually she moved back home to Cleveland. She was hired as a line designer and illustrator for American Greetings where she designed and illustrated gift wrapping and greeting cards. After leaving American Greetings she became a freelance editorial cartoonist. Over a span of four years, she created editorial cartoons for U.S. Catholic magazine, various newsletters, Cleveland Scene, and illustrated a cover of the Cleveland Free Times.

In 2008, Seibel created the comics strip Rock City—Terminally ILL, which was published in alternative weeklies like Chicago's Newcity, the Cleveland Free Times, and The Austin Chronicle.

Seibel collaborated extensively with comics creator Harvey Pekar, writer of American Splendor, in the final years of his life. In March 2008, Seibel attended a Jewish Authors in Comics Symposium at a local college. When she got there the only seat left open was the one next to Pekar himself. They struck up a conversation. This led her to a series of collaborations with Pekar. First, Pekar took over writing duties on Rock City—Terminally ILL; they worked on a number of pieces for other publications, including Heeb and the Jewish Review of Books. In 2009, Seibel became the lead illustrator for the webcomics series The Pekar Project (which was edited by Jeff Newelt and published on Smith Magazine).

Following Pekar’s death in 2010, a dispute arose between Seibel and Pekar's widow Joyce Brabner concerning both Seibel’s collaboration with Pekar and her role in posthumous projects. Accounts characterized the conflict as involving both personal and professional tensions, as well as disagreements over the handling of Pekar’s work after his death. According to The New York Times, Brabner opposed Seibel’s continued participation in The Pekar Project and certain related publications. Some reports further described efforts to exclude Seibel from aspects of Pekar’s posthumous work, although accounts of the dispute vary.

Shortly afterward, Seibel's work was discovered by Russ Kick, editor of a three-volume, 1500-page anthology series titled The Graphic Canon which features the world's great literature interpreted by over 120 artists and illustrators, including R. Crumb, Maxon Crumb, Will Eisner, Molly Crabapple, Sharon Rudahl, Dame Darcy, S. Clay Wilson, Gris Grimly, Roberta Gregory, and Kim Deitch. For The Graphic Canon Volume One, Seibel contributed adaptations of Victor Hugo's Les Misérables and Walt Whitman's Leaves of Grass. For Volume Two, Seibel adapted F. Scott Fitzgerald's The Great Gatsby and a series of graphic biographies of the Beat Generation (Jack Kerouac, Diane di Prima, William S. Burroughs, and Allen Ginsberg), as well as Sigmund Freud's The Interpretation of Dreams. She graphically adapted Oscar Wilde's "The Nightingale and the Rose" for The Graphic Canon of Children's Literature.

In 2013, Seibel became the curator and gallery owner of Tara Seibel Art Gallery in Cleveland's Historic Little Italy in University Circle. At the gallery there are exhibits of paintings, crafts, drawings and some comic art on display. She also hosts exhibits for local artists in the Cleveland area, including participating three times in the "from WOMEN" show curated by Mary Urbas of Lakeland Community College to celebrate Women's History Month.

Seibel illustrates the Art Walk posters for Cleveland's Little Italy neighborhood.

In 2016, she offered to design and illustrate the Short Sweet Film Fest poster, an annual film festival held in Cleveland. She also hosted a Q & A about the late Harvey Pekar, one of the film subjects.

== Teaching ==
In 2011, Seibel taught workshops at Ursuline College, a small, Roman Catholic liberal arts women's college in Pepper Pike, Ohio; learning and teaching watercolor techniques under the practice of Sr. Kathleen Burke, Phd, the founder of the Master of Arts in Counseling and Art Therapy program.

In 2012, Seibel created the class "How to design your own greeting card line" for adult education classes at the Pepper Pike Learning Center.

The summer of 2016, she started instructing summer camp at The Fairmount Center for the Arts, in which children were engaged in keeping an art diary every day for a week, writing, drawing, painting and taking photos of their personal stories for documentation and therapy. This summer she will be adding calligraphy techniques, and "the lost art of handwriting" to the curriculum.

2019-2022, Seibel taught painting and art-journal for teens classes at Fairmount Center for the Arts.

== Personal life ==
Seibel resides with her family in the Cleveland suburb of Pepper Pike. Her husband Aaron Seibel is a graduate of Marquette University, an optical engineer, and co-inventor of two patents. The Seibels have three grown children — Lauren, Patrick and Oscar.

== Selected bibliography ==
=== Editorial illustrations, cartoons, and comic strips ===
- "Al Fresco Dining in Cleveland" cover illustration, Cleveland Free Times, May 2003.
- "Show Me the Way to go Home," U.S. Catholic vol. 71, no. 2, February 2006.
- "My Prolife Protest," U.S. Catholic vol. 71, no. 5, May 2006.
- "For Extra Credit," U.S. Catholic vol. 71, no. 8, August 2006.
- "A Less-Catholic Europe," U.S. Catholic vol. 71, no. 9, September 2006.
- "Criminal Intent," U.S. Catholic vol. 71, no. 10, October 2006.
- "A Poor Measure of Poverty," U.S. Catholic vol. 71, no. 11, November 2006.
- "Cramming for Christmas," U.S. Catholic vol. 71, no. 12, December 2006.
- "Lake View Cemetery," Cleveland Scene, August 2008.
- "Anthony Bourdain" / "From R. Crumb's 78 Record Collection," Juxtapoz Art & Culture Magazine, July 2010.
- "Harvey in the Spring" editorial illustration, The New York Times, July 2010.
- Rock City—Terminally ILL:
  - "Question," Newcity, vol. 23, no. 1045, July 2008.
  - "Lake View Cemetery," Cleveland Free Times, July 2008.
    - reprinted in Newcity vol. 23, no. 1047, July 2008.
    - reprinted in Mineshaft no. 23, November 2008. (eds. Everett Rand & Gioia Palmieri) ISSN 1532-138X
  - "Tara the Cartoonist," Newcity vol. 23, no. 1062, September 2008.

=== Comic books ===
==== Rock City—Terminally ILL (self-published) ====
- #1 (2009) — with contributions from Harvey Pekar, Joseph Remnant, Rick Parker, and Sean Pryor
- #2 (2010) — with contributions from Harvey Pekar, Robert Crumb, Pablo Guerra, Camilovsky, Mark Murphy, and Joel Nakamura

=== Projects with Harvey Pekar ===
==== Rock City—Terminally ILL ====
- "Hey, Emily," The Austin Chronicle vol. 27, no. 49, August 2008.
  - reprinted in Newcity vol. 23, no. 1054, September 2008.
- "Bathtub Movers," Funny Times vol. 23, no. 7, July 2008.
- "A Certain Kind of Trait," Newcity vol. 23, no. 1056, September 2008.
- "Da Vinci For Dummies," Newcity vol. 23, no. 1060, October 2008.

==== The Pekar Project ====
- "Pekar & Crumb, Talkin' 'Bout Art"
- "The Art of Making Sushi"
- "No Reservations"
- "Phone Hustlers"
- "da Vinci For Dummies"
- "A Certain Kind of Trait"
- "Oscar the Amazing Baby"

==== Other ====
- "Are God's Children Too Stupid?", Heeb no. 18, Fall 2008 ("The Politics Issue").
- "The Genesis Review," Jewish Review of Books, Spring 2010.
- "Upmanship & Downmanship," Jewish Review of Books, Summer 2010.
- "Sorry, this is the best I can do," Comics' Comics: Cartoons Drawn By Your Favorite Comedians, compiled by Eric Beasley (Mark Batty Publisher, May 2011) ISBN 978-1-935613-15-2 — with illustrators Rick Parker, Sean Pryor and Joseph Remnant

=== Anthologies and collected works ===
- "The Vestibule," Next Door Neighbor, ed. Dean Haspiel (Smith Magazine, 2009)
- (adaptation of) Victor Hugo's Les Misérables, in The Graphic Canon vol. II, ed. Russ Kick (Seven Stories Press, 2010) ISBN 978-1-60980-378-0
- (adaptation of) Walt Whitman's Leaves of Grass, in The Graphic Canon vol. II, ed. Russ Kick (Seven Stories Press, 2010) ISBN 978-1-60980-378-0
- (adaptation of) F. Scott Fitzgerald's The Great Gatsby, in The Graphic Canon vol. III, ed. Russ Kick (Seven Stories Press, 2013) ISBN 978-1-60980-380-3
- "Four Beats" (biographies of the Beat Generation), in The Graphic Canon vol. III, ed. Russ Kick (Seven Stories Press, 2013) ISBN 978-1-60980-380-3
- (adaptation of) Sigmund Freud's The Interpretation of Dreams, in The Graphic Canon vol. III, ed. Russ Kick (Seven Stories Press, 2013) ISBN 978-1-60980-380-3
- (adaptation of) Oscar Wilde's "The Nightingale and the Rose," The Graphic Canon of Children's Literature: The Worlds Great Kids' Lit As Comics and Visuals, ed. Russ Kick (Seven Stories Press, summer 2014) ISBN 978-1-60980-530-2
- Long Story Short: Turning Famous Books into Cartoons, ed. Mr. Fish (Akashic Books, summer 2020) ISBN 978-1-61775-796-9
