= Alena Smith =

American screenwriter

- Born: United States
- Occupation(s): Screenwriter, producer, author
- Years active: 2012–present
- Notable work: Dickinson; The Affair

Alena Smith is an American screenwriter, producer, and author best known for creating the Apple TV+ series Dickinson. In addition to creating the show, she also executive produces and has written numerous episodes.

== Career ==
Smith got her first professional writing gig for the television series My America, before eventually becoming a staff writer for The Newsroom. In 2019, she created, produced, and wrote the Apple TV+ series Dickinson, with a second season premiering in January 2021 and a third in November 2021.

Smith is a graduate of Haverford College and the Yale School of Drama.

== Filmography ==
=== Film ===
Year	Title	Writer	Producer	Notes
2013	Writing Date	Yes	No	Short film; also actress as Veronica
2014	My America	Yes	No	
2018	The Bad Guys	Yes	Yes	

=== Television ===
Year	Title	Writer	Producer	Notes
2012	My America	Yes	No	Episode: "Miss America"
2014	The Newsroom	Yes	No	6 episodes
2015–2017	The Affair	Yes	Yes	12 episodes
2019–2021	Dickinson	Yes	Yes	30 episodes, directed "This was a Poet -"

== Bibliography ==
- Tween Hobo (2016)
