= Russ Kick =

American writer and editor (1969–2021)

- Born: Russell Charles Kick III; July 20, 1969; Tuscaloosa, Alabama, U.S.
- Died: September 12, 2021 (aged 52); Tucson, Arizona, U.S.
- Occupations: Writer, editor in chief, FOIA advocate, animal rights activist, publisher

Russell Charles Kick III (July 20, 1969 – September 12, 2021) was an American writer, editor, anthologist, and publisher.

Russell Charles Kick III was born on July 20, 1969, in Tuscaloosa, Alabama. Early in his career, Kick wrote articles, a column, and a cover story for The Village Voice. He was the founder and editor of The Memory Hole, Memory Hole 2, and Altgov2, which published and archived U.S. government documents, including scientific studies, documents received under FOIA and civil rights-related reports, intelligence and covert action reports, consumer safety reports, and images including photographs of flag-draped coffins of American military personnel. These photographs of the war dead garnered worldwide media attention, including heavy rotation on all 24-hour news channels and front-page coverage on major newspapers, including The New York Times. The Memory Hole also gained attention for posting a completely uncensored version of a Justice Department report about its internal hiring practices, leading to a front-page story in The New York Times.

Kick was editor-at-large for The Disinformation Company and he wrote three books and edited six anthologies, including You Are Being Lied To and 50 Things You're Not Supposed to Know. He also edited an anthology of classic and contemporary poems about death for Disinformation and Red Wheel/Weiser.

He compiled and edited a three-volume, 1,600-page anthology set entitled The Graphic Canon from Seven Stories Press. The series features the world's great literature interpreted by more than 120 artists and illustrators such as R. Crumb, Maxon Crumb, Will Eisner, Molly Crabapple, Sharon Rudahl, Dame Darcy, S. Clay Wilson, Gris Grimly, Roberta Gregory, Kim Deitch, and Tara Seibel. The first volume, From The Epic of Gilgamesh to Shakespeare to Dangerous Liaisons (spring 2012), covers literature from ancient times through the end of the eighteenth century. The second volume, Kubla Khan to the Brontë Sisters to The Picture of Dorian Gray (fall 2012), is devoted completely to the nineteenth century. The third volume, From Heart of Darkness to Hemingway to Infinite Jest (spring 2013), covers the entire twentieth century.

The next volume in the continuing project, The Graphic Canon of Children's Literature, was published in November 2014. The last volume completed in the series, Graphic Canon of Crime and Mystery was published in November 2017 by Seven Stories Press. It expanded the Graphic Canon series into the genres of crime and mystery.

From 2018 to 2021, he was the director of open records for Rise for the Animals where he expanded the ARLO (Animal Research Laboratory Overview) database to include information obtained through FOIA and public records requests related to animal experimentation and animal welfare at a variety of research facilities.

At the age of 52, Kick died on September 12, 2021, in Tucson, Arizona. No cause of death was announced, but Kick's sister said he had suffered from health problems for over a decade.

== Books ==
- 50 Things You're Not Supposed to Know, The Disinformation Company, Ltd. 2003. ISBN 0-9713942-8-8
- 50 Things You're Not Supposed to Know, Vol. 2, The Disinformation Company, Ltd. 2005. ISBN 1-932857-02-8
- 100 Things You're Not Supposed to Know, The Disinformation Company Ltd. 2008. ISBN 1-932857-62-1
- Abuse Your Illusions: The Disinformation Guide to Media Mirages and Establishment Lies (editor), The Disinformation Company Ltd. 2003. ISBN 0-9713942-4-5
- Death Poems: Classic, Contemporary, Witty, Serious, Tear-Jerking, Wise, Profound, Angry, Funny, Spiritual, Atheistic, Uncertain, Personal, Political, Mythic, Earthy, and Only Occasionally Morbid (editor), Disinformation Books, an imprint of Red Wheel/Weiser. 2013. ISBN 978-1938875045
- The Disinformation Book of Lists: Subversive Facts and Hidden Information in Rapid-fire Format, The Disinformation Company Ltd. 2004. ISBN 0-9729529-4-2
- Everything You Know About God Is Wrong: The Disinformation Guide to Religion (editor), The Disinformation Company Ltd. 2007. ISBN 978-1-932857-59-7
- Everything You Know About Sex Is Wrong: The Disinformation Guide to the Extremes of Human Sexuality (and Everything in Between) (editor), The Disinformation Company Ltd. 2005. ISBN 1-932857-17-6
- Everything You Know Is Wrong: The Disinformation Guide to Secrets and Lies (editor), The Disinformation Company Ltd. 2002. ISBN 0-9713942-0-2
- Flash Wisdom: A Curated Collection of Mind-Blowing, Perspective-Changing Quotes (editor), Disinformation Books, an imprint of Red Wheel/Weiser, March 2015. ISBN 978-1938875120
- The Graphic Canon of Children's Literature (editor), Seven Stories Press, summer 2014.
- The Graphic Canon: The World's Great Literature as Comics and Visuals, Volume One: From The Epic of Gilgamesh to Shakespeare to Dangerous Liaisons (editor), Seven Stories Press, 2012. ISBN 978-1-60980-376-6
- The Graphic Canon: The World's Great Literature as Comics and Visuals, Volume Two: From Kubla Khan to the Brontë Sisters to The Picture of Dorian Gray (editor), Seven Stories Press, 2012.
- The Graphic Canon: The World's Great Literature as Comics and Visuals, Volume Three: From Heart of Darkness to Hemingway to Infinite Jest (editor), Seven Stories Press, 2013.
- Hot off the Net: Erotica and Other Sex Writings from the Internet (editor), Black Books. 1999. ISBN 1-892723-00-X
- Outposts: A Catalog of Rare and Disturbing Information, Carroll & Graf Publishers, 1995.
- Psychotropedia: A Guide to Publications on the Periphery, Critical Vision, 1998. ISBN 1-900486-03-2
- You Are Being Lied To: The Disinformation Guide to Media Distortion, Historical Whitewashes and Cultural Myths (editor), The Disinformation Company Ltd. 2001. ISBN 0-9664100-7-6
