= A Letter to a Royal Academy =

Essay written by Benjamin Franklin (circa 1781)

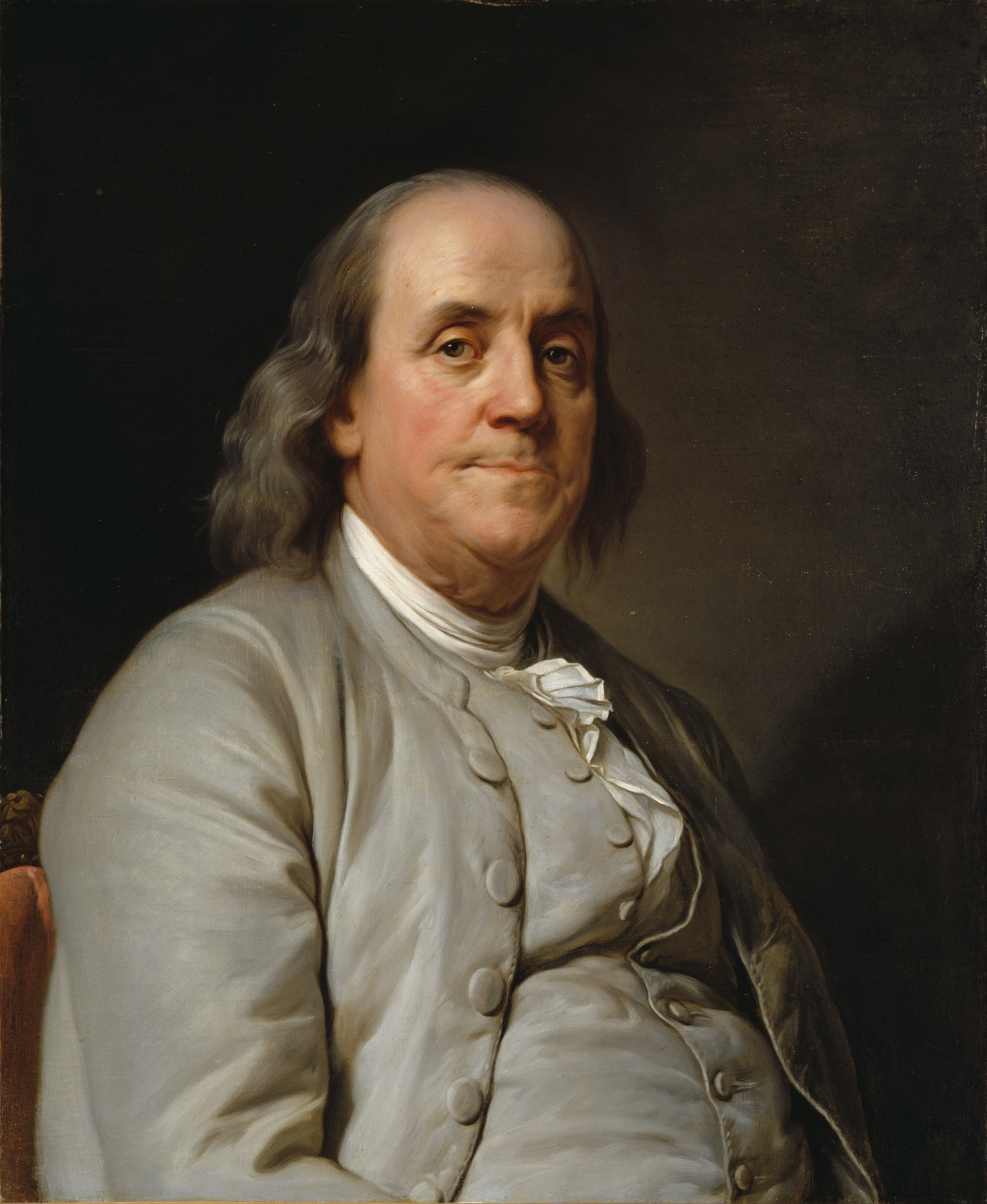
Franklin punned that compared to his ruminations on flatulence, other scientific investigations were "scarcely worth a FART-HING"

"A Letter to a Royal Academy" (sometimes referred to as "A Letter to a Royal Academy about Farting" or "Fart Proudly") is the name of an essay about flatulence written by Benjamin Franklin c. 1781 while he was living abroad as United States Ambassador to France. It is an example of flatulence humor.

== Description ==
"A Letter to a Royal Academy" was composed in response to a call for scientific papers from the Royal Academy of Brussels. Franklin believed that the various academic societies in Europe were increasingly pretentious and concerned with the impractical. Revealing his "bawdy, scurrilous side," Franklin responded with an essay suggesting that research and practical reasoning be undertaken into methods of improving the odor of human flatulence.

Franklin never submitted the essay to the Brussels Academy, but enclosed it in a letter of 16 September 1783 to British philosopher and clergyman Richard Price with whom Franklin had an ongoing correspondence, with the jocular suggestion that he should forward it to English chemist Joseph Priestley, who was famed for his work on gases, "who is apt to give himself Airs." Price did so, reporting back that "I convey’d this to Dr Priestley, and we have been entertained with the pleasantry of it and the ridicule it contains."

Franklin's essay begins:

I have perused your late mathematical Prize Question, proposed in lieu of one in Natural Philosophy, for the ensuing year [...] Permit me then humbly to propose one of that sort for your consideration, and through you, if you approve it, for the serious Enquiry of learned Physicians, Chemists, &c. of this enlightened Age. It is universally well known, that in digesting our common food, there is created or produced in the bowels of human creatures, a great quantity of wind. That the permitting this air to escape and mix with the atmosphere, is usually offensive to the company, from the fetid smell that accompanies it. That all well-bred people therefore, to avoid giving such offence, forcibly restrain the efforts of nature to discharge that wind.

The essay goes on to discuss the way different foods affect the odor of flatulence and to propose scientific testing of farting. Franklin also suggests that scientists work to develop a drug, "wholesome and not disagreeable", which can be mixed with "common Food or Sauces" with the effect of rendering flatulence "not only inoffensive, but agreeable as Perfumes". The essay ends with a pun saying that compared to the practical applications of this discussion, other sciences are "scarcely worth a fart-hing."

Copies of the essay were privately printed by Franklin at his printing press in Passy. In the 1960s, it was included in volume 32 of the American Philosophical Society's Papers of Benjamin Franklin.

== In modern times ==
Since 1929, the essay has sometimes been printed alongside a note from "the publisher to the reader," which claims that the original letter "has been owned by the United States nation since 1881," before going on to further flatulence-related puns: "Dark hints by Franklin's biographers have tainted the air behind its back, but the maiden modesty of even the most contemporary of them has blushed and halted on the brink of its release." The foreword also ironically thanks engraver Thomas Bewick (d. 1838), who, being long dead, "has graciously made no objection" to the use of his illustrations to accompany the piece.

In 2021, on the 240th anniversary of Franklin's letter, MEL Magazine commissioned a response from scientists at the Young Academy of Belgium, a department of the modern Royal Flemish Academy (and thus a successor to Franklin's Royal Academy of Brussels).

== See also ==
- "Advice to a Friend on Choosing a Mistress"
- Flatulence humor
