= Advice to a Friend on Choosing a Mistress =

Letter by Benjamin Franklin

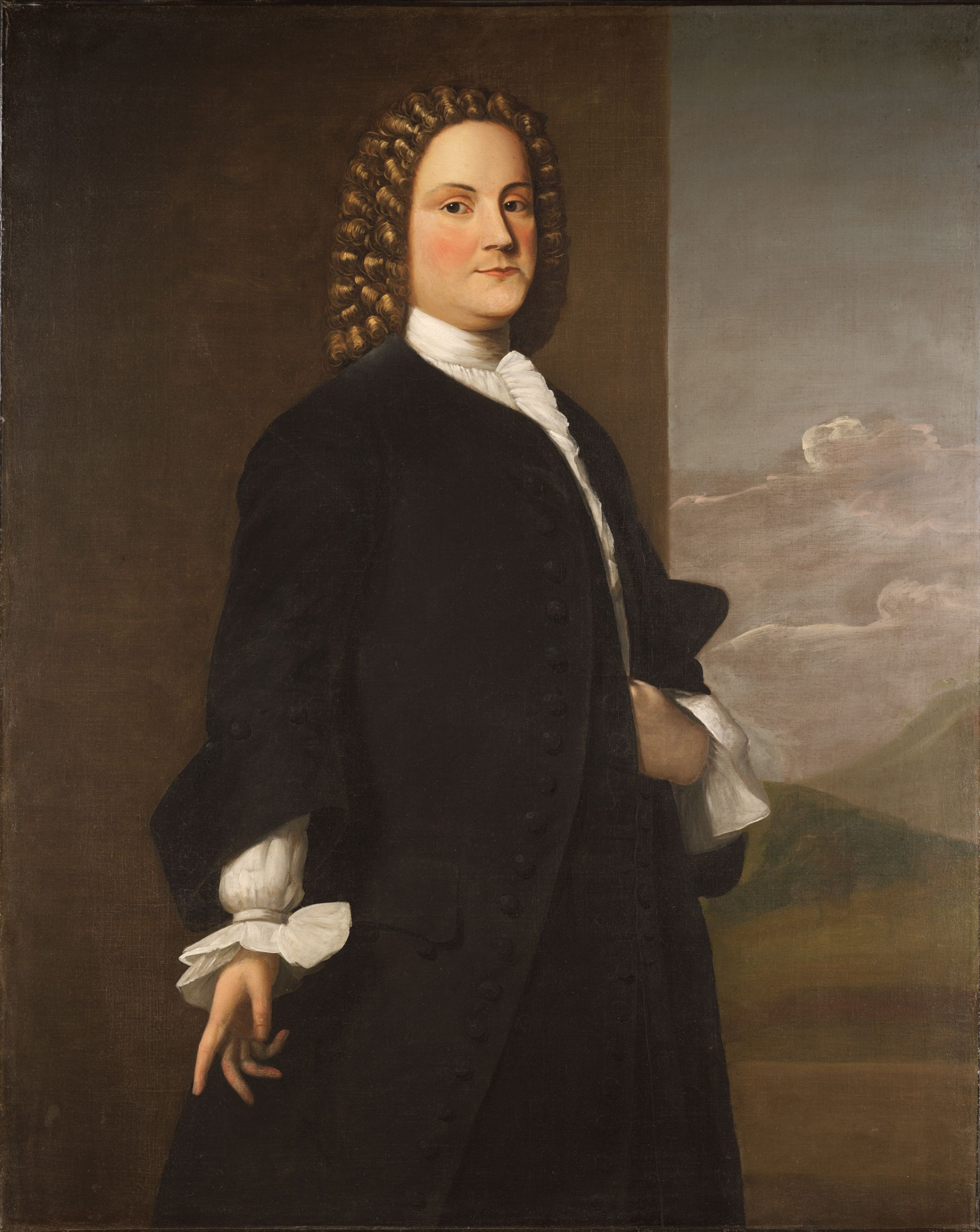
Benjamin Franklin, the writer of letter.

"Advice to a Friend on Choosing a Mistress" is a letter by Benjamin Franklin dated June 25, 1745, in which Franklin counsels a young man about channeling sexual urges to marry. Due to its licentious nature the letter was not published in collections of Franklin's papers in the United States during the 19th century. Federal court decisions from the mid- to late- 20th century cited the document as a reason for overturning obscenity laws.

== Summary ==
The text begins by advising a young man that a cure for sexual urges is unknown, and the proper solution is to take a wife. Then, expressing doubts that the intended reader will actually marry, Franklin names several advantages of marriage. As supplementary advice in case the recipient rejects all previous arguments, Franklin lists eight reasons why an older mistress is preferable to a young one. Advantages include better conversation, less risk of unwanted pregnancy, and "greater prudence in conducting an intrigue."

According to John Richard Stevens, the unnamed correspondent is a friend of Franklin's named Cadwallader Colden, and it remains unknown whether Franklin was serious or if the letter was ever delivered. Whether serious or humorous, the letter is frankly sexual:

The Face first grows lank and wrinkled; then the Neck; then the Breast and Arms; the lower Parts continuing to the last as plump as ever: So that covering all above with a Basket, and regarding only what is below the Girdle, it is impossible of two Women to know an old from a young one. And as in the dark all Cats are grey, the Pleasure of corporal Enjoyment with an old Woman is at least equal, and frequently superior, every Knack being by Practice capable of Improvement.

== Censorship ==
The letter is not the only document by Franklin that was later censored. The bawdy portion of Franklin's writing was accepted during his own era. Although the letter was not published during his lifetime, Franklin's public works include an essay called "Fart Proudly". A passage from his autobiography describes an unsuccessful attempt to seduce a friend's mistress. As John Semonche observes in Censoring Sex: A Historical Journey Through American Media, the autobiography was widely read during the 19th century because of its moral lessons, but the passage about the failed seduction was variously altered or deleted entirely. The Mistress letter was omitted from 19th century publications of Franklin's works, and by some accounts it was singled out for suppression.

This censorship occurred both informally and under law. The first state to enact obscenity legislation was Vermont in 1821. During the following decades every state except New Mexico adopted similar laws. Then the Comstock Act of 1873 made it a federal crime to circulate "obscene, lewd, and/or lascivious" material through the mail.

Although Franklin had mistresses throughout his life (including one still-unknown mistress who bore William Franklin, his only son who survived to adulthood), such circumstances were incompatible with patriotic sensibilities a century afterward. Amy Beth Werbel opines:

At a time when America was scant one hundred years old, Benjamin Franklin was an important part of its founding mythology. Some Americans felt it their patriotic duty to hide the fact that the conqueror of electricity and continental congressman was also a raunchy (and probably unfaithful) lout.

== Citations ==
By the mid-20th century, United States federal judges were citing the letter in originalist reasoning to overturn obscenity laws. A Jerome Frank appellate opinion of 1957 named "Advice to a Young Man on Choosing a Mistress" along with "The Speech of Polly Baker" as two examples that would have convicted one of the nation's leading founding fathers on federal obscenity charges if they had been written and mailed under subsequent law.

The most notable of these citations occurred in the United States Supreme Court case, United States v. 12 200-ft. Reels of Film. In a dissenting opinion, Justice William O. Douglas states:

The First Amendment was the product of a robust, not a prudish, age... This was the age when Benjamin Franklin wrote his "Advice to a Young Man on Choosing a Mistress" and "A Letter to the Royal Academy at Brussels". When the United States became a nation, none of the fathers of the country were any more concerned than Franklin with the question of pornography... The Anthony Comstocks, the Thomas Bowdlers and Victorian hypocrisy—the predecessors of our present obscenity laws—had yet to come upon the stage.

== Full text ==
The entire text is as follows:

Advice to a Friend on Choosing a Mistress (1745)

June 25, 1745

My dear Friend,

I know of no Medicine fit to diminish the violent natural Inclinations you mention; and if I did, I think I should not communicate it to you. Marriage is the proper Remedy. It is the most natural State of Man, and therefore the State in which you are most likely to find solid Happiness. Your Reasons against entring into it at present, appear to me not well-founded. The circumstantial Advantages you have in View by postponing it, are not only uncertain, but they are small in comparison with that of the Thing itself, the being married and settled. It is the Man and Woman united that make the compleat human Being. Separate, she wants his Force of Body and Strength of Reason; he, her Softness, Sensibility and acute Discernment. Together they are more likely to succeed in the World. A single Man has not nearly the Value he would have in that State of Union. He is an incomplete Animal. He resembles the odd Half of a Pair of Scissars. If you get a prudent healthy Wife, your Industry in your Profession, with her good Œconomy, will be a Fortune sufficient.

But if you will not take this Counsel, and persist in thinking a Commerce with the Sex inevitable, then I repeat my former Advice, that in all your Amours you should prefer old Women to young ones. You call this a Paradox, and demand my Reasons. They are these:

1. Because as they have more Knowledge of the World and their Minds are better stor’d with Observations, their Conversation is more improving and more lastingly agreable.
2. Because when Women cease to be handsome, they study to be good. To maintain their Influence over Men, they supply the Diminution of Beauty by an Augmentation of Utility. They learn to do a 1000 Services small and great, and are the most tender and useful of all Friends when you are sick. Thus they continue amiable. And hence there is hardly such a thing to be found as an old Woman who is not a good Woman.
3. Because there is no hazard of Children, which irregularly produc’d may be attended with much Inconvenience.
4. Because thro’ more Experience, they are more prudent and discreet in conducting an Intrigue to prevent Suspicion. The Commerce with them is therefore safer with regard to your Reputation. And with regard to theirs, if the Affair should happen to be known, considerate People might be rather inclin’d to excuse an old Woman who would kindly take care of a young Man, form his Manners by her good Counsels, and prevent his ruining his Health and Fortune among mercenary Prostitutes.
5. Because in every Animal that walks upright, the Deficiency of the Fluids that fill the Muscles appears first in the highest Part: The Face first grows lank and wrinkled; then the Neck; then the Breast and Arms; the lower Parts continuing to the last as plump as ever: So that covering all above with a Basket, and regarding only what is below the Girdle, it is impossible of two Women to know an old from a young one. And as in the dark all Cats are grey, the Pleasure of corporal Enjoyment with an old Woman is at least equal, and frequently superior, every Knack being by Practice capable of Improvement.
6. Because the Sin is less. The debauching a Virgin may be her Ruin, and make her for Life unhappy.
7. Because the Compunction is less. The having made a young Girl miserable may give you frequent bitter Reflections; none of which can attend the making an old Woman happy.
8. [thly and Lastly] They are so grateful!!

Thus much for my Paradox. But still I advise you to marry directly; being sincerely Your affectionate Friend.

== See also ==
- Censorship in the United States
