= I'm Nobody! Who are you? =

Poem by Emily Dickinson

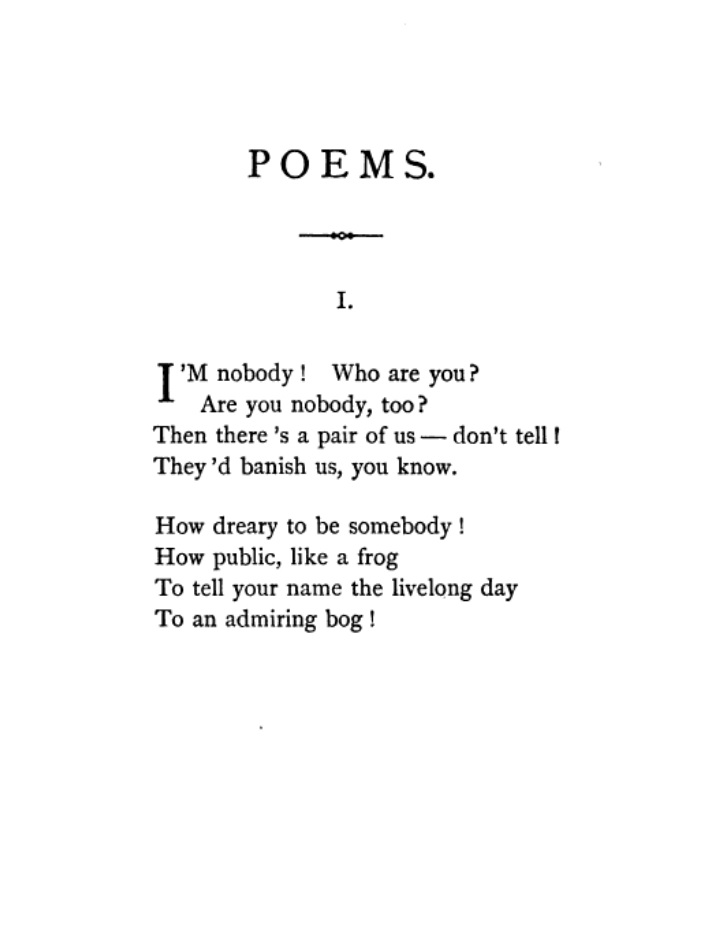
The poem as it appeared when published posthumously in 1891

"I'm Nobody! Who are you?" is a short lyric poem by Emily Dickinson first published posthumously in 1891 in Poems, Series 2. It is one of Dickinson's most popular poems.

== Summary ==
The poem is composed of two quatrains and, with an exception of the first line, the rhythm alternates between iambic tetrameter and iambic trimeter. The poem employs alliteration, anaphora, simile, satire, and internal rhyme but no regular end rhyme scheme. However, lines 1 and 2 and lines 6 and 8 end with masculine rhymes. Dickinson incorporates the pronouns you, we, us, your into the poem, and in doing so, draws the reader into the piece. The poem suggests anonymity is preferable to fame. It was first published in 1891 in Poems, Series 2, a collection of Dickinson's poems assembled and edited by Mabel Loomis Todd and Thomas Wentworth Higginson.

== Text ==
Close transcription

I'm Nobody! Who are you?
Are you - Nobody - too?
Then there's a pair of us!
Don't tell! they'd advertise - you know!

How dreary - to be - Somebody!
How public - like a Frog -
To tell one's name - the livelong June -
To an admiring Bog!

First published version

I'm nobody! Who are you?
Are you nobody, too?
Then there's a pair of us — don't tell!
They'd banish us, you know.

How dreary to be somebody!
How public, like a frog
To tell your name the livelong day
To an admiring bog!

== Critique ==
"I'm Nobody!" is one of Dickinson's most popular poems, Harold Bloom writes, because it addresses “a universal feeling of being on the outside." It is a poem about "us against them"; it challenges authority (the somebodies), and "seduces the reader into complicity with its writer."
