= I taste a liquor never brewed =

Poem by Emily Dickinson

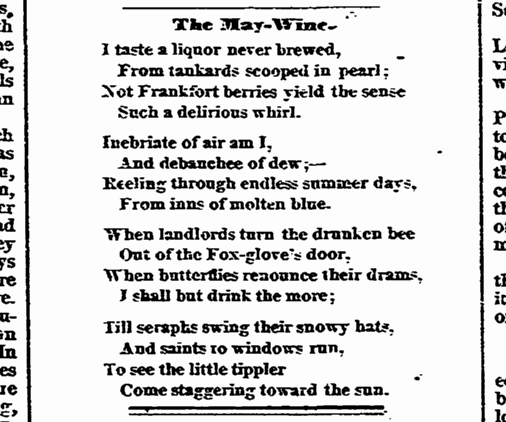
The poem as published in the Springfield Daily Republican of 4 May 1861

"I taste a liquor never brewed" is a lyrical poem written by Emily Dickinson first published in the Springfield Daily Republican on May 4, 1861, from a now lost copy. Although titled "The May-Wine" by the Republican, Dickinson never titled the poem so it is commonly referred to by its first line.

The poem celebrates Dickinson's intoxication with life in an ironic and transformative manner, drawing on themes of popular temperance reform of the time.

== Text of the poem ==
Close transcription

I taste a liquor never brewed —
From Tankards scooped in Pearl —
Not all the Frankfort Berries
Yield such an Alcohol!

Inebriate of air — am I —
And Debauchee of Dew —
Reeling — thro' endless summer days —
From inns of molten Blue —

When "Landlords" turn the drunken Bee
Out of the Foxglove's door —
When Butterflies — renounce their "drams" —
I shall but drink the more!

Till Seraphs swing their snowy Hats —
And Saints — to windows run —
To see the little Tippler
Leaning against the — Sun!

First published version (1890)

I taste a liquor never brewed,
From tankards scooped in pearl;
Not all the vats upon the Rhine
Yield such an alcohol!

Inebriate of air am I,
And debauchee of dew,
Reeling, through endless summer days,
From inns of molten blue.

When landlords turn the drunken bee
Out of the foxglove's door,
When butterflies renounce their drams,
I shall but drink the more!

Till seraphs swing their snowy hats,
And saints to windows run,
To see the little tippler
Leaning against the sun!

== Description ==
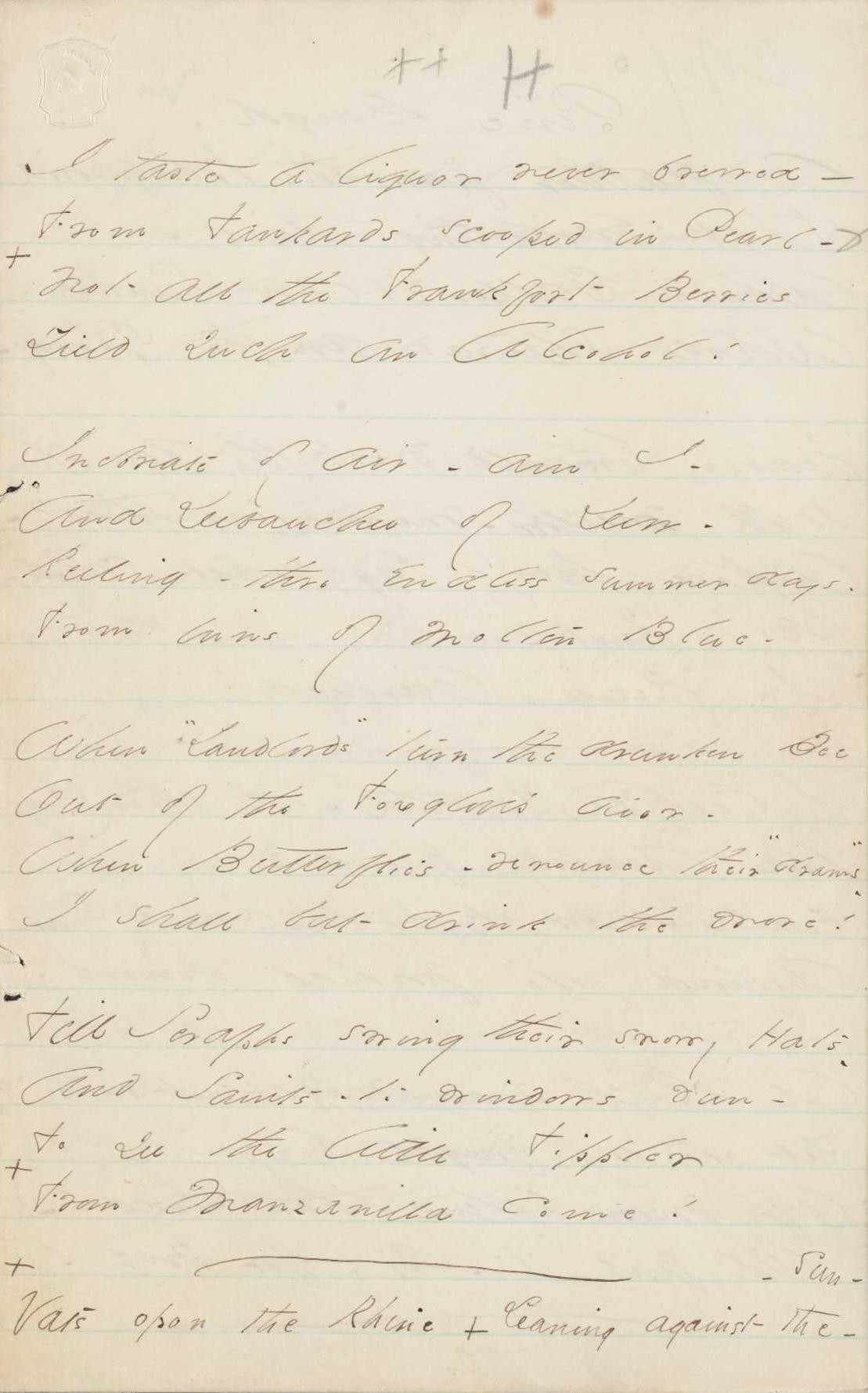
Manuscript version in the Houghton Library (72a), J214, Fr207.

Emily Dickinson's manuscript version differs significantly from the Republican version in the last two lines of the first verse and in its final line (from Manzanilla come!).

The poem exhibits several typical features of Dickinson's poems. Like most of Dickinson's poems, it was written in ballad metre, iambic lines that alternate between four and three beats to the line. This is a less regular, more intimate, version of the common metre used in hymns such as Amazing Grace. The syllable count is not so strict and only the second and fourth lines are required to rhyme.

Because I could not stop for Death,
He kindly stopped for me;
The Carriage held but just Ourselves
And Immortality.

— from Emily Dickinson's poem #712

As in most of her poems, dashes typically replace punctuation and there is an idiosyncratic use of capitalization. These were edited from the poem by the Republican, but Emily regarded them as an integral part of her verse.

The poem begins with a paradox (a liquor never brewed) and finishes with a striking image (a tippler supported by the sun rather than the traditional lamppost), both common devices in Dickinson's poetry. It employs slant rhyme in the first quatrain, where pearl is made to rhyme with alcohol. Dickinson was censured for this (precisely this example by Andrew Lang) by some early critics while others celebrated it as avant-garde. That Dickinson used the slant rhyme in her manuscript version (it is not in the Republican version) demonstrates she preferred it and indeed examples occur in most of her verse. She famously remarked, "Tell all the Truth, but tell it slant".

== Temperance reform ==
In his essay Emily Dickinson and popular culture, David S. Reynolds considers Emily Dickinson's receptiveness to popular culture. Temperance literature was a fertile seedbed of imagery, both for her and for other writers of the period such as Thoreau she was familiar with. In the first verse, Dickinson ironically revises the popular trope of the intemperate temperance advocate, as both completely drunk and completely temperate ("a liquor never brewed"). Succeeding verses revise other popular images. For example, the third verse brings to mind Timothy Shay Arthur's Ten Nights in a Bar Room. Her use of quotation marks underscores that she is borrowing from others. Her purpose however is to transform these images, intoxicating her readers themselves with the force of her imagination.
