= Imperial and Royal Academy of Brussels =

The Imperial and Royal Academy (French: Académie impériale et royale de Bruxelles; Dutch: Keizerlijke en koninklijke academie van Brussel) was founded in Brussels by letters patent of the Empress Maria Theresa dated 16 December 1772, to promote the study of science and literature (in the broadest senses of both words). The sessions of the academy were to take place in the Royal Library in Brussels, which at the same time became an institution open to the public. The first session was held on 13 April 1773.

The first director of the Academy was an Englishman, John Needham FRS. The Dutch grammarian Jan Des Roches was secretary.

Members were encouraged to write "dissertations" on particular topics or questions. The impact of this practice on the writing of history was to encourage discussion of technical and historiographical problems, rather than an antiquarian approach to uncovering the past.

In 1794 the academy was closed down by the French Revolutionaries who had taken power in Brussels.

== Proceedings ==
From 1777, proceedings were published under the title Mémoires de l'Académie impériale et royale des sciences et belles-lettres.

- Mémoires de l'Académie impériale et royale des sciences et belles-lettres, vol. 1 (Brussels, 1777). Available on Google Books.
- Mémoires de l'Académie impériale et royale des sciences et belles-lettres, vol. 2 (Brussels, 1780). Available on Google Books.
- Mémoires de l'Académie impériale et royale des sciences et belles-lettres, vol. 3 (Brussels, 1780). Available on Google Books.
- Mémoires de l'Académie impériale et royale des sciences et belles-lettres, vol. 4 (Brussels, 1783). Available on Google Books.
- Mémoires de l'Académie impériale et royale des sciences et belles-lettres, vol. 5 (Brussels, 1788). Available on Google Books.

== Bibliography ==
- Hervé Hasquin, ed., L'Académie impériale et royale de Bruxelles: ses académiciens et leurs réseaux intellectuels au xviiie siècle (Brussels, 2009).
