= The God Machine (comics) =

- Date: October 2010
- Page count: 160 pages
- Publisher: Archaia Studios Press

Creative team
- Writers: Chandra Free
- Artists: Chandra Free
- Letterers: Chandra Free
- Colourists: Chandra Free
- ISBN: 1932386874

The God Machine is a 2010 graphic novel published by Archaia Studios Press. It is written and illustrated by Chandra Free.

== Plot summary ==
After the death of his girlfriend, Sith, Guy Salvatore can no longer make sense of his own world. He has hallucinations of monsters that besiege him with requests and threaten his life wherever he goes. He is completely unsure if these manifestations are real or are born in his mind. As the line between reality and insanity is blurred Guy comes across a man who calls himself Satan and claims holds the answers to all of Guy’s worries. Satan restores Guy's hope promising Sith is still alive, but the two Gods that oversee existence let her be ripped from her world by unknown forces. She is now drifting through dimensional planes known as “Dream Worlds.” Satan pleads Guy to use his power to leave his world’s plane, search for Sith, and seek retribution from the Gods that caused the ordeal.

The chapter takes place in the present day in the town of Salem. Things start off with our main character, Guy, waking up and going to school after seeing a massive "hallucination" come out of his bathroom mirror and ask for floss. At school he is only reminded of the loss of his girlfriend and leaves. After a night of more strange creatures, he struggles to sleep and finally does so only to meet with a woman calling herself "sickness" in his dream. She turns into a hideous creature, kissing Guy and holding him in her clutches. Guy wakes up started and upset.

We are then taken to the entrance of Heaven, the domain of the character Good God. Her character comes in hoping to get back into her office in, but has lost her key to the door to Heaven. She calls for the aid of her friend and fellow god Evil God, second in command to Good God and ruler of hell. Together they go look for the key in the last place she was, a graveyard in Guys town.

At the same time this is happening, Guy has gone to the graveyard and is mourning the loss of his girlfriend. When the gods show up, he is able to see them, which shouldn't be possible for normal human beings. Upon seeing Good God, Guy locks eyes with her, but the gods disappear. Guy grows more frustrated with the series of events taking place around him, and as he expresses his anger, a man claiming to be Satan appears suddenly. He claims Guy's girlfriend is alive and that he can still find her in another dimension. Initially Guy shrugs the man off as one of his hallucinations, but as his hallucinations become more vivid and physically threatening, he begins to question our perception of reality and his own sanity.

The second chapter opens in an area called "The Door Nexus" which is described as being between you, the devil and the deep blue sea". Good God and Evil God come through a door, Evil God yelling about the fact that Guy saw them. Good God says they can simply look Guy up, and go into the Limbo dimension. There they run into Limbo God, third in command and keeper of Limbo, who goes with them to go eat before looking up Guy.

Meanwhile Guy is in math class, where Mortia, the girlfriend of Andrew who is Guy's best friend, is hitting on Guy. He yells at her drawing the attention of the teacher, but begins to see horrific things in class while his teacher is talking to him. His teacher is able to snap him out of this situation by yelling at him to go to the principal's office.

In the realm of Heaven, the gods are investigating Guy Salvatore and why such strange events keep taking place around him. They find nothing abnormal about him, but his ability to see the gods says otherwise, leaving the gods feeling apprehensive about Guy.
