= Because I could not stop for Death =

Poem by Emily Dickinson

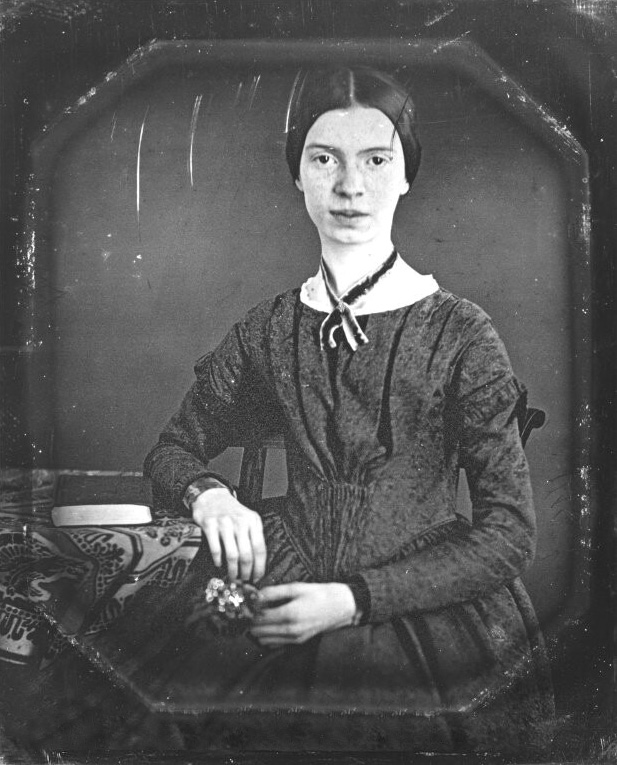
Emily Dickinson in a daguerreotype, circa December 1846 or early 1847

"Because I could not stop for Death" is a lyrical poem by Emily Dickinson first published posthumously in Poems: Series 1 in 1890. Dickinson's work was never authorized to be published, so it is unknown whether "Because I could not stop for Death" was completed or "abandoned". The speaker of Dickinson's poem meets personified Death. Death is a gentleman who is riding in the horse carriage that picks up the speaker in the poem and takes the speaker on her journey to the afterlife. According to Thomas H. Johnson's variorum edition of 1955 the number of this poem is "712".

== Summary ==
The poem was published posthumously in 1890 in Poems: Series 1, a collection of Dickinson's poems assembled and edited by her friends Mabel Loomis Todd and Thomas Wentworth Higginson. The poem was published under the title "The Chariot". It is composed in six quatrains in common metre. Stanzas 1, 2, 4, and 6 employ end rhyme in their second and fourth lines, but some of these are only close rhyme or eye rhyme. In the third stanza, there is no end rhyme, but "ring" in line 2 rhymes with "gazing" and "setting" in lines 3 and 4 respectively. Internal rhyme is scattered throughout. Figures of speech include alliteration, anaphora, paradox, chiasmus, and personification.

The poem personifies Death as a gentleman caller who takes a leisurely carriage ride with the poet to her grave. She also personifies immortality.

A volta, or turn, occurs in the fourth stanza. Structurally, the syllables shift from its regular 8-6-8-6 scheme to 6-8-8-6. This parallels with the undertones of the sixth quatrain. The personification of death changes from one of pleasantry to one of ambiguity and morbidity: "Or rather—He passed Us— / The Dews drew quivering and chill—" (13–14). The imagery changes from its original nostalgic form of children playing and setting suns to Death's real concern of taking the speaker to the afterlife.

== Text ==
Close transcription

Because I could not stop for Death —
He kindly stopped for me —
The Carriage held but just Ourselves —
And Immortality.

We slowly drove — He knew no haste
And I had put away
My labor and my leisure too,
For His Civility —

We passed the School, where Children strove
At Recess — in the Ring —
We passed the Fields of Gazing Grain —
We passed the Setting Sun —

Or rather — He passed Us —
The Dews drew quivering and Chill —
For only Gossamer, my Gown —
My Tippet — only Tulle —

We paused before a House that seemed
A Swelling of the Ground —
The Roof was scarcely visible —
The Cornice — in the Ground —

Since then — 'tis Centuries — and yet
Feels shorter than the Day
I first surmised the Horses' Heads
Were toward Eternity —

First published version

THE CHARIOT

Because I could not stop for Death,
He kindly stopped for me;
The carriage held but just ourselves
And Immortality.

We slowly drove, he knew no haste,
And I had put away
My labor, and my leisure too,
For his civility.

We passed the school where children played,
Their lessons scarcely done;
We passed the fields of gazing grain,
We passed the setting sun.

We paused before a house that seemed
A swelling of the ground;
The roof was scarcely visible,
The cornice but a mound.

Since then 'tis centuries; but each
Feels shorter than the day
I first surmised the horses' heads
Were toward eternity.

== Critique and interpretation ==
Dickinson has been seen as a "pagan" poet by some (sometimes referring to herself as such), and classified by others as a Christian poet in the meditative tradition. There are interpretations that relate "Because I could not stop for Death" specifically to Christian belief in the afterlife, reading the poem from the perspective of a "delayed final reconciliation of the soul with God."

In the poem, the speaker joins both "Death" and "Immortality" inside the carriage that collects her, thus personifying a two part process. If one interprets this according to Christian scripture, the poem imagines an afterlife most similar to the book of Revelation. First life stops following death, but, à la Revelation, we only encounter eternity at time's end (by way of resurrection and last judgment). While death is the guaranteed of the two, immortality "remains ... an expectation." The horses that lead the carriage are only facing "toward Eternity," which indicates either that the speaker has yet to reach it or that it can never be reached at all.

Dickinson's tone contributes to the poem as well. In describing a traditionally frightening experience, the process of dying and passing into eternity, she uses a passive and calm tone. Critics attribute the lack of fear in her tone as her acceptance of death as "a natural part of the endless cycle of nature."

In 1936 Allen Tate wrote,

[The poem] exemplifies better than anything else [Dickinson] wrote the special quality of her mind ... If the word great means anything in poetry, this poem is one of the greatest in the English language; it is flawless to the last detail. The rhythm charges with movement the pattern of suspended action back of the poem. Every image is precise and, moreover, not merely beautiful, but inextricably fused with the central idea. Every image extends and intensifies every other ... No poet could have invented the elements of [this poem]; only a great poet could have used them so perfectly. Miss Dickinson was a deep mind writing from a deep culture, and when she came to poetry, she came infallibly.

== Musical settings ==
The poem has been set to music by Aaron Copland as the twelfth song of his song cycle Twelve Poems of Emily Dickinson. John Adams set the poem to music as the second movement of his choral symphony Harmonium. It has also been set to music by Natalie Merchant (on Retrospective: 1995–2005). Additionally, a setting was made by Lynette Westendorf for her cantata Lonesome as the Land: The Civil War Through the Diaries of Boy Soldiers (2015.)
