= Twins (disambiguation) =

Twins are two offspring produced in the same pregnancy.

Twins may also refer to:

== Arts, entertainment and media ==
=== Fictional characters ===
- Twins (The Matrix)
- The Twins (Transformers)
- Leonel and Marco Salamanca, Breaking Bad and Better Call Saul characters referred to as "The Twins"
- The Twins, or Spazmatism and Retinazer, a pair of bosses in the video game Terraria
- The Twins, a pair of fictional characters in the animated series Shaun the Sheep

=== Films ===
- The Twins (1923 film), an Australian silent film
- Twins (1925 film), an American comedy film starring Stan Laurel
- Twins (1988 film), an American comedy film starring Arnold Schwarzenegger and Danny DeVito
- The Twins (2005 film), a South Korean film
- The Twin (2022 film), a psychological horror film

=== Literature ===
- Twins (Dermansky novel), a 2006 young adult novel by Marcy Dermansky
- Twins (graphic novel), a 2020 graphic novel by Varian Johnson and Shannon Wright
- Twins, a 1977 novel by Jack Geasland and Bari Wood, based on the story of Stewart and Cyril Marcus
- Twins, a series of 26 children's books by Lucy Fitch Perkins
- Twins, a 1999 photobook by Steven Underhill
- The Twins (De Loo novel), by Tessa de Loo, 1993
- The Twins (1930 novel), a novel by Abd Al Quddus Al Ansari
- "The Twins", a poem by Henry Sambrooke Leigh (1837–1883)
- Twins: A Variety Store Named "The End of the World", a novel by Novala Takemoto
- "The Twins" (folktale), an Albanian folktale

=== Music ===
==== Bands ====
- Twins (group), a Hong Kong Cantopop duo
- The Twins (Australian duo), an EDM and house group
- The Twins, twin sisters who performed together as actresses and as a dance/pop duo in the 1990s, Gayle and Gillian Blakeney
- The Twins (German duo), a synth-pop and Eurodisco group
- TWiiNS, a Slovak pop group
- Twinz, an American hip hop duo

==== Albums ====
- Twins (By2 album), 2009
- Twins (In the Nursery album) or the title song, 1986
- Twins (Ornette Coleman album), 1971
- Twins (Super Junior album) or the title song (see below), 2005
- Twins (Ty Segall album), 2012
- Twins (2001 EP), by Twins
- Twins (2002 EP), by Twins

==== Songs ====
- "Twins" (Philip Bailey and Little Richard song), from the 1988 film
- "Twins (Knock Out)", by Super Junior, 2005
- "Twins", by Gem Club, 2011
- "Twins", by Maritime from We, the Vehicles, 2005

=== Television ===
- Twins (TV series), a 2005 American sitcom
- The Twins (1979 TV series), a Hong Kong television series
- "The Identical Twins", an episode of Strange Experiences
- "Twins" (Doctors), a 2003 episode
- "The Twins" (Star Wars: Visions), a 2021 episode

== Science and technology ==
- TWINS (Two Wide-Angle Imaging Neutral-Atom Spectrometers), a NASA program
- Temperature and Winds for InSight (TWINS), a meteorological suite onboard InSight Mars lander
- Twins, in crystal twinning

== Sports ==
- LG Twins, a Korean baseball team
- Minnesota Twins, an American baseball team
- Thunder Bay Twins, a defunct Canadian hockey team
- Thunder Bay K&A Twins, a defunct Canadian hockey team

== Other uses ==
- Gimmigela Chuli, or The Twins, a mountain in the Himalayas

== See also ==
- Gemini (disambiguation)
- The Twin (disambiguation)
- Twin (disambiguation)
- Twin Sisters (disambiguation)
- Twin Towers (disambiguation)
