= Twinn =

Twinn may refer to:

- Ian Twinn (born 1950), British Conservative politician
- Peter Twinn (1916–2004), British mathematician, World War II codebreaker and entomologist
- Schwinn Twinn, a tandem bicycle
- Walter Patrick Twinn (1934–1997), Canadian Chief of the Sawridge First Nation

== See also ==
- Twin (disambiguation)
- Twinning (disambiguation)
