= Notre Dame Queer Film Festival =

LGBTQ film festival in Indiana, USA

- Location: University of Notre Dame
- Inaugurated: February 11–14, 2004

The Notre Dame Queer Film Festival was cofounded by Liam Dacey and Richard Friedman in 2004 and ran in 2005 under the same moniker. In 2006, under pressure from a new administration led by University President Rev. John I. Jenkins, the name of the festival was changed to Gay and Lesbian Film: Filmmakers, Narratives, Spectatorships. The 2007 incarnation of the festival again changed names to Qlassics: Reimagining Sexuality and the Self in Recent American Cinema. More recently, the series has been titled the GlobaLGBTQ+ Film Festival, with a primary focus on films produced outside of the United States.

== 2004 ==
The first Notre Dame Queer Film Festival ran from February 11, 2004–February 14, 2004, on the campus of the University of Notre Dame. All films were shown at the Hesburgh Library Auditorium. The festival was sponsored by The Gay and Lesbian Alumni/ae of the University of Notre Dame and Saint Mary's College (GALA-ND/SMC) as well as several university academic departments, including the Department of Film, Television, and Theater, Department of English, Department of Anthropology, Gender Studies Program, and OutreachND (an unrecognized gay and lesbian student group). The festival ran just over a year after Richard Friedman had coordinated bringing transgender activist S. Bear Bergman to the university for a multimedia theater presentation, one of the first times a member of the LGBTQ+ community was featured in a public event co-sponsored by departments with the university.

The original official mission of the festival was to promote discussion and awareness of queer films in a context of acceptance of all sexualities at the University of Notre Dame, and, in the words of Liam Dacey, co-founder and festival student chair, to "normalize the existence of gay students on this campus and offer to the entire community the opportunity to enjoy and study the extraordinary accomplishment of gay cinema artists in the United States." The other co-founder, Richard Friedman, a fifth year architecture and psychology major, worked to establish University and community support and to promote the event. After gaining the support of academic departments, the Queer Film Festival was sanctioned an official academic event. Notre Dame, under president Rev. Edward Malloy, allowed the festival to occur on the principle of academic freedom. As stated by Richard Friedman at the time, "You have to understand what a breakthrough this is - the University's administration had even barred gay groups from advertising in the student newspaper." Unlike its second year, the first Queer Film Festival did not experience public protests.

Liam Dacey, a senior film major at the time, worked with Gus Hinojosa, co-founder and GALA ND/SMC Chair, to raise funds, attract national filmmakers, and seek community support. Other notable GALA ND/SMC members who worked on the festival included David Pais and Kevin Heffernan.

In a 2004 interview, Dacey said: "We want to create an awareness that the gay members of the Notre Dame community are members like anyone else. We also wanted to exhibit a lot of different films by gay artists that you wouldn't normally see."

On February 11, 2004, the documentary Jim in Bold screened with producer Malcolm Lazin and Young Gay America co-founders Michael Glatze and Scott MacPhae. On February 12, 2004, Hedwig and the Angry Inch was shown to a sold-out audience. A question and answer session followed with director and star John Cameron Mitchell. Go Fish was shown on February 13, 2004, with an introduction by Notre Dame Professor Jill Godmilow. The final day of the festival featured two films and talkback sessions: All Over the Guy with producer/star Dan Bucatinsky, and The Opposite of Sex with director Don Roos.

Three panels also took place during the festival. Tom O'Neil led a panel called "Gay Hollywood: Still in the Closet" on February 12, 2004. Don Roos hosted a screenwriting workshop on February 13, 2004, and Ron Gregg, Programming Director and Lecturer for the Committee on Cinema and Media Studies at the University of Chicago, moderated an academic panel entitled "Film and the Construction of Sexual Identity" on February 14, 2004.

The Queer Film Festival attracted national media attention and was covered in such outlets as The Chicago Tribune and The Fox News Channel. Dacey said at the end of the festival that "it's been the best weekend I've had at Notre Dame."

== 2005 ==
The second Notre Dame Queer Film Festival was held from February 10, 2005–February 12, 2005. The venue of the festival moved to the state-of-the-art Debartolo Center for the Performing Arts Browning Cinema. Dacey shifted his role from student chair to director of operations and media relations for the festival. Joanna Basile was the student chair and GALA ND/SMC Chair Gus Hinojosa remained the alumni chair.

The second festival featured Saved! on February 10, 2005, with a talkback with director Brian Dannelly. On February 11, 2005, the documentary In Good Conscience: Sister Jeannine Gramick's Journey of Faith screened preceded by a panel on gay marriage with producer Brendan Faye, director Barbara Rick, Rick Garcia, Notre Dame Proefessor Gail Bederman, and Sister Jeannine Gramick. The panel was moderated by GALA ND/SMC member David Pais. A second documentary entitled Gay Pioneers also was shown that day with a talk by the late longtime gay and lesbian civil rights activist Barbara Gittings (1932–2007). The film adaptation of Angels in America was shown on the evening of February 11 and afternoon of February 12 while Love! Valour! Compassion! screened on that evening with a question and answer session by director and Tony award-winner Terrence McNally.

Matthew V. Storin, University of Notre Dame Vice President of News and Information, said of the 2005 festival: "There are people who object to it and we respect those opinions. But if we attempted to stop the culture of the United States of America in the year 2005 at the gate on Notre Dame Avenue and on Juniper Road, not only would that be a fruitless exercise, but we really wouldn't be preparing our students for the world they're going to enter into."

Bishop John D'Arcy of the Ft. Wayne-South Bend, Indiana, diocese condemned the festival as "an abuse of academic freedom." Storin responded in a written statement, which said: "within reason, we would prefer that our students encounter the secular American culture, with all its faults, in the context of their Catholic education rather than attempting to cloister them till the time they graduate, only then to confront reality."
