= I Am Michael =

2015 film by Justin Kelly

- Theatrical release poster
- Directed by: Justin Kelly
- Screenplay by: Justin Kelly; Stacey Miller
- Based on: "My Ex-Gay Friend" by Benoit Denizet-Lewis
- Produced by: Vince Jolivette; Michael Mendelsohn; James Franco; Scott Reed; Ron Singer
- Starring: James Franco; Zachary Quinto; Emma Roberts; Charlie Carver
- Cinematography: Christopher Blauvelt
- Edited by: Aaron I. Butler
- Music by: Jake Shears; Tim K
- Production companies: Rabbit Bandini Productions; Patriot Pictures, LLC.
- Distributed by: Brainstorm Media
- Release dates: January 29, 2015 (Sundance); January 27, 2017 (United States)
- Running time: 101 minutes
- Country: United States
- Language: English

I Am Michael is a 2015 American biographical drama film written and directed by Justin Kelly. Based on the journalist Benoit Denizet-Lewis' New York Times Magazine article "My Ex-Gay Friend", the film stars James Franco, Zachary Quinto, Emma Roberts, and Charlie Carver. Franco plays Michael Glatze, a gay activist who renounces homosexuality and becomes a Christian pastor. Filming ran in New York City from August 11 to August 30, 2014.

The film was released in a limited release and through video on demand on January 27, 2017, by Brainstorm Media.

== Synopsis ==
In the late 1990s and early 2000s, Michael Glatze (James Franco) is a highly influential and articulate figure within the American LGBTQ movement. Residing in San Francisco, he serves as a managing editor for XY Magazine, a popular publication dedicated to young gay men. Michael is defined by his fierce intellect, confidence, and uncompromising advocacy for queer identity. He shares a deeply committed, loving, and stable ten-year relationship with his partner, Bennett (Zachary Quinto), a clothing designer. Seeking to expand their impact, Michael and Bennett co-found Young Gay America (YGA), a new magazine and non-profit organization designed to support, educate, and empower closeted youth living in conservative areas of the United States. During a cross-country road trip to film a documentary for the magazine, they meet Tyler (Charlie Carver), a charismatic young man. A mutual attraction develops, and Tyler joins them back in San Francisco, transitioning their relationship into a harmonious and mutually supportive polyamorous triad. At this peak of his life, Michael is a celebrated champion of gay rights, completely secure in his sexuality and social circle.

Michael's world is upended when he begins experiencing sudden, debilitating physical symptoms, including sharp chest pains, shortness of breath, and severe palpitations. Because his father died of a sudden heart attack when Michael was only thirteen, followed by the death of his mother when he was nineteen, Michael becomes deeply paranoid that he has inherited a fatal, congenital heart condition. He falls into a state of hyper-fixation on his mortality. He undergoes extensive medical examinations and undergoes multiple tests. The doctors inform him that his heart is perfectly healthy and that his physical symptoms are entirely psychosomatic, diagnosed as a severe panic disorder fueled by deep-seated trauma and grief. Despite the medical clearance, the psychological damage remains. The brush with what he believed was impending death triggers a profound existential crisis. Michael is consumed by a debilitating fear of death, non-existence, and the potential of eternal damnation. Desperate for comfort and an absolute truth that science cannot provide, he begins turning away from his secular lifestyle and starts an obsessive spiritual search, exploring Buddhism, Taoism, and Mormonism.

Michael's quest eventually leads him to orthodox and fundamentalist Christianity. He begins reading the Bible in isolation, interpreting his intense panic attacks not as a medical condition, but as a literal, divine warning from God. Through his solitary study, Michael undergoes a psychological shift: he begins to view his homosexuality not as a core facet of his identity, but as a spiritual affliction, a symptom of past trauma, and an obstacle to God's grace. He starts a personal blog to document his radicalizing beliefs. This causes immediate and severe friction within his household. Bennett and Tyler watch in disbelief and growing horror as Michael’s online rhetoric shifts from progressive activism to conservative, anti-gay theology. The absolute breaking point arrives when Michael writes a highly controversial article for a conservative Christian website titled "How a 'Gay Rights' Leader Became Straight." The piece goes viral, spiking immense national outrage, media scrutiny, and a profound sense of betrayal throughout the LGBTQ+ community. Bennett attempts a series of desperate interventions. He pleads with Michael to seek secular mental health therapy, reminding him of their decade of shared love, and arguing that he is merely reacting to trauma. However, Michael remains cold and detached, dismissing his past relationship and his entire identity as a sinful illusion. Realizing that the man they loved is gone, Bennett and Tyler break ties with him. Michael packs his belongings, abandons his career, and leaves San Francisco, completely severing contact with his entire social network.

Seeking formal validation for his conversion and a completely new environment, Michael relocates to a remote, conservative Bible college in rural Wyoming. Upon his arrival, he faces immediate skepticism and distrust from both the faculty and the student body due to his highly publicized and notorious past as a gay activist. Determined to prove the authenticity of his faith, Michael adopts a strictly traditional lifestyle, throws himself into rigorous theological studies, and vocally reinforces the school's anti-LGBTQ+ doctrines. During his time at the college, Michael meets Rebekah (Emma Roberts), a pious, gentle, and deeply religious young student. Michael begins a traditional, conservative courtship with her. To Michael, pursuing a heterosexual relationship and marriage is the ultimate, tangible proof of his spiritual redemption and psychological healing. While the film explicitly portrays his genuine affection for Rebekah, it also highlights lingering moments of silent internal conflict, subtextual tension, and the immense psychological willpower required for Michael to suppress his natural inclinations and conform to his new reality. Despite these underlying complexities, Michael remains unwavering in his chosen path. He successfully graduates, marries Rebekah in a traditional Christian ceremony, and is officially ordained. The film concludes with Michael fully established in his new life as the pastor of a small, rural, conservative church in Wyoming, presenting a final look at a man who completely remade his identity in the pursuit of spiritual survival and salvation.

== Cast ==
- James Franco as Michael Glatze
- Zachary Quinto as Bennett
- Emma Roberts as Rebekah
- Charlie Carver as Tyler
- Avan Jogia as Nico Gladstone
- Devon Graye as Cory
- Leven Rambin as Catherine
- Daryl Hannah as Deborah
- Lesley Ann Warren as Susan
- Blake Lee as Benoit
- Kevin Cahoon as Peter
- Ahna O'Reilly as Laura

== Production ==
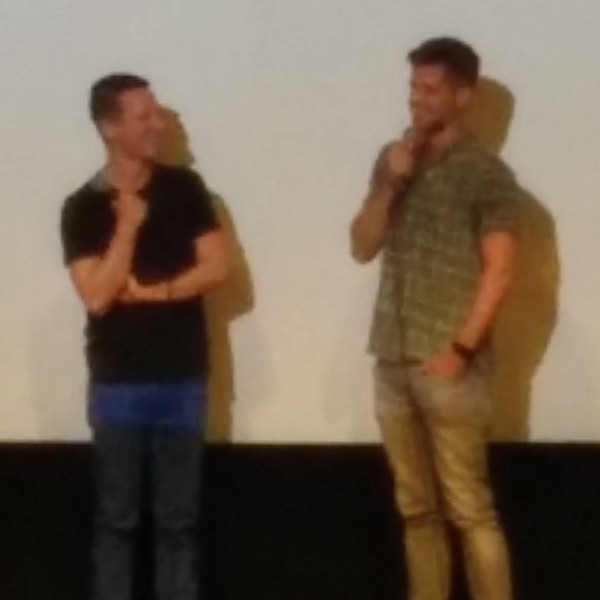
Director Justin Kelly with Charlie Carver, who plays Tyler

On April 1, 2014, James Franco was added to the film to play Michael Glatze, a gay activist who later renounced homosexuality. Justin Kelly was set to direct the film Michael based on Benoit Denizet-Lewis' New York Times Magazine article "My Ex-Gay Friend", while Gus Van Sant would executive produce the film. On July 14, Zachary Quinto, Emma Roberts, and Chris Zylka joined the cast of the film. Quinto would play Bennett, the former boyfriend of Franco's character, Roberts would play his girlfriend, and Zylka would play another past love interest.

Director Justin Kelly said that "this isn't just a story about an 'ex-gay', it's actually a very relatable story about the power of belief and the desire to belong". On August 14, Charlie Carver joined the film to play Tyler, who gets involved in a relationship with Michael and Bennett and is heartbroken when Michael rejects homosexuality. On August 15, Avan Jogia joined the film as Nico, a young man whom Michael meets and falls for along his journey. On August 18, Lesley Ann Warren joined the film's cast to play Quinto's character's mother. On August 25, Daryl Hannah joined the film to play Deborah, who runs a Colorado Buddhist retreat where Michael goes to find solace.

=== Filming ===
Principal photography began on August 11, 2014, in New York City as actor Franco shared images from the set. On August 20, Franco was spotted during filming on Ocean Avenue in East Rockaway. The production wrapped on August 31, 2014 in Baldwin, New York. Also present in film is Musician/Artist Soda, seen as a dancer in a few scenes. He also supplied artwork for the set. This is notable to mention as he is an alumnus of East Rockaway High School under his birth name.

== Release ==
The film was released at the 2015 Sundance Film Festival, and also screened in the Panorama section of the 65th Berlin International Film Festival. It received its California premiere during the 17th FilmOut San Diego. The film was the opening night film of the Frameline Film Festival on June 18, 2015 at the Castro Theatre in San Francisco. Brainstorm Media acquired distribution rights to the film, and set the film for a limited release and through video on demand on January 27, 2017.

== Reception ==
The film drew mostly mixed reviews. On review aggregator website Rotten Tomatoes, the film holds an approval rating of 62% based on 37 reviews, and an average rating of 6.1/10. The website's critical consensus reads, "I Am Michael takes a determinedly balanced approach to its complex subject, and although the results don't always add up, they're anchored by strong work from James Franco." On Metacritic, the film has a weighted average score of 56 out of 100, based on 19 critics, indicating "mixed or average".

Peter Debruge of Variety wrote, "An unusually nuanced James Franco carries this complex portrait of a man who came out and fought to encourage other LGBT youth before converting to conservative Christianity," but concluded that the film was too dry and kept the title character too distant and veiled in its attempt to be impartial.

Boyd van Hoeij wrote in The Hollywood Reporter, "Thankfully, the screenplay doesn't portray the story in simple terms of good or evil, but that doesn't mean that there's quite enough nuance or insight to constantly elevate the material above the level of a well-made-but-TV-ready biopic." Indiewire's Eric Kohn gave the film a B+ grade.

== See also ==
- List of lesbian, gay, bisexual or transgender-related films of 2015
