= Menace =

Menace may refer to:

== Arts and entertainment ==
=== Film and television ===
- The Menace (1928 film), an Australian silent film
- The Menace (1932 film), an American crime drama
- The Menace (1961 film)
- Menace (1934 American film)
- Menace (1934 British film), directed by Adrian Brunel and starring Victor Varconi
- La Menace, a 1977 French-Canadian film
- Menace (TV series), starring Michael Gothard
- "Menace" (Stargate SG-1), a season-five episode of the television series Stargate SG-1
- "Menace", a season-seven episode of the television series Law & Order

== Literature ==
- Menace (Marvel Comics), a foe of Spider-Man
- Menace (DC Comics), a villain from DC Comics
- Menace (Atlas Comics), a 1950s science-fiction/horror comic-book series
- The Menace, the main villain of the first 12 books of the Goosebumps Horrorland children's novella series
- Menace (Queen's Blade), a character from Hobby Japan's Queen's Blade media franchise
- The Menace (newspaper), an anti-Catholic weekly newspaper published in Aurora, Missouri, from 1911 to 1920

== Music ==
- Menace, a UK punk rock band
- The Menace (album), by English alternative rock group Elastica
- "Menace", a song by Five Finger Death Punch from the album American Capitalist

=== Games and toys ===
- Menace (video game), a 1988 horizontal scrolling shooter game
- Menace, the final boss of 2005 video game Castlevania: Dawn of Sorrow
- Schumacher Menace, a radio-controlled car made by Schumacher Racing Products

== Sports teams ==
- Des Moines Menace, an American soccer team
- New Mexico Menace, an Independent Women's Football League team in the 2008 and 2009 seasons, based in Albuquerque, New Mexico
- Steel City Menace, a short-lived American Indoor Football team that played part of the 2016 season

== People ==
- "The Menace", a nickname of Dennis Priestley (born 1950), English former professional darts player
- Darragh Ennis, Irish scientist and quizzer known as "The Menace" on the television series The Chase

== Other uses ==
- Menace (Greek settlement), an ancient Greek settlement to the southeast of Spain, according to Strabo
- Operation Menace or Battle of Dakar, an unsuccessful World War II Allied operation
- The menace reflex, a form of blink reflex
- MENACE, a short name for the Matchbox Educable Noughts and Crosses Engine
- A threat

== See also ==
- Master Menace, a Marvel Comics character
- Madame Menace, a persona of Sunset Bain, a Marvel Comics character
- Menaces, a legal term in the UK
- Menacing, a criminal offense in many US states
