= Twin (disambiguation) =

A twin is one of two offspring produced in the same pregnancy.

Twin may also refer to:

- Twin, Alabama, a city in the United States
- Twin, Belgium, Walloon name of the Belgium city of Thuin
- Twin (production team), a Swedish record production and songwriting team
- Twin (TV series), a Norwegian television crime drama series from 2019
- Twin (windowing system), a windowing environment for text mode displays
- "Twin (song)", a song by Roddy Ricch featuring Lil Durk
- "Twin", a song from the album Ruby by Jennie
- Twin pattern, a software design pattern
- Willows TWIN, a Windows emulator
- Twin, a member of the Minnesota Twins baseball team
- Flat-twin engine
- V-twin engine
- Straight-twin engine, also referred to as a parallel-twin
- Crystal twin, a crystal sample with two domains containing a twin boundary
- Twin house, semi-detached housing
- Twin towns and sister cities, towns and cities involved in town twinning
- Air Creation Twin, a French two seat ultralight trike design

== Surname ==
- Peter J. Twin (born 1937), English nuclear physicist

== See also ==
- Twin paradox, a thought experiment
- Twin prime, a type of prime number
- Twin Range, a mountain range in the U.S. state of New Hampshire
- Twin Cone, a volcanic cone in British Columbia, Canada
- Twinning (disambiguation)
- Twins (disambiguation)
- The Twin (disambiguation)
- Twin Sisters (disambiguation)
- Gemini (disambiguation)
