= The Twin =

The Twin may refer to:

- The Twin (album), a 2017 album by Sound of Ceres
- The Twin (EP), an EP by The Twin alias Boy George
- The Twin (1984 film), a 1984 French comedy film
- The Twin (2017 film), a 2017 American horror film
- The Twin (2022 film), a Finnish horror film
- The Twin (novel), a 2006 novel by Gerbrand Bakker

== See also ==
- Twin (disambiguation)
- Twins (disambiguation)
