= Benoit Denizet-Lewis =

American journalist

- Born: Benoit Denizet-Lewis; June 19, 1975 (age 51); San Francisco County
- Citizenship: U.S., French
- Education: French American International School; Medill School, Northwestern University (B.S.)
- Occupations: Journalist, non-fiction writer, college professor
- Parent(s): Benedicte Denizet (French, mother); Dennis Lewis (American, father)
- Writing career
- Period: 1997-present
- Notable works: Travels with Casey (2014); America Anonymous (2009) "My Ex-Gay Friend" (2011; The NYT Magazine, basis for film, I Am Michael, 2015)
- Notable awards: Alicia Patterson Foundation grant (2004); The Advocate Forty-under-40 list (2009); New America National Fellow (2022); NEH Public Scholars award (2023)
- Website: benoitdenizetlewis.com

Benoit Denizet-Lewis (IPA, /bəˈnwa dəniˈze - ˈluːɪs/ (Note: Note the mixed pronuncation, per Minzesheimer (2014), op. cit.—here presented as the Wikipedia IPA standard—with French accenting and pronunciation of the given name "Benoit", and the adopted mother's maiden name, "Denizet" (e.g., the "ze" of the Denizet accented third syllable rhyming with "say"), and with English accenting and pronunciation of the father's surname, "Lewis".)) (born June 19, 1975) is a journalist, author, and a frequent contributor to The New York Times Magazine. He is the author of four books, all published by Simon & Schuster, including the 2015 New York Times best-selling Travels with Casey. As of May 2026 he continued a more than decade-long commitment to Emerson College, where he was serving as an associate professor in their Writing, Literature and Publishing department.

== Early life and education ==
Denizet-Lewis was born on June 19, 1975, in San Francisco County to a French mother, Benedicte Denizet, and an American father, Dennis Lewis. He has described his parents as "new agey" in interview, and he was raised, over the years, in San Francisco. He graduated from the high school program at French American International School, there, in 1993, and during school, "he played varsity basketball and soccer, wrote and acted in school theater productions, and founded the school's muckraking and generally scandalous newspaper", The Exposer.

He obtained a bachelor's degree in journalism from Medill School of Journalism at Northwestern University, graduating in June 1997, where he was a feature writer and columnist for the Daily Northwestern and a member of Phi Delta Theta fraternity.

== Career ==
A high school alumni feature states that Denizet-Lewis began his journalism career at the Walnut Creek, California-based Knight-Ridder newspaper, the Contra Costa Times. The piece indicates that his next employment was as a news and features editor at XY magazine, followed by a "short stint" on staff at the San Francisco Chronicle; it then states that he next moved to a position as senior writer at Boston Magazine, "where he wrote about sports, business, crime, and youth culture." He is also reported, by his College employer's news service, to have served, prior to 2013, as editor-in-chief at The Good Men Project, also in Boston.

Denizet-Lewis states in a grant application that he began as a contributing writer for The New York Times Magazine in 2002, when he was 26, and remained in that position, per Erin Clossey of Emerson College, as late as August 2023. His writing there, again per Clossey of Emerson, as reported in 2021, has been "about sexual identity and LGBTQ life, mental health, politics, and culture". As of May 1, 2026, he was an associate professor in the Writing, Literature and Publishing department of Emerson College.

=== Faculty positions ===
Prior to Denizet's hiring as an assistant professor at Emerson College, he taught non-fiction and magazine writing at Northeastern University and Tufts University, and held, in 2012, the position of Merton M. Sealts Jr. Writer-in-Residence in Ohio at The College of Wooster, with Denizet-Lewis' 2023 National Endowment for the Humanities grant application indicating his responsibility there was for teaching non-fiction writing. The application then has him beginning his commitment at Emerson College in 2013, with eventual responsibility for the college's Publishing Series, and further teaching responsibilities over time that included undergraduate and graduate teaching in longform writing, interdisciplinary studies, and "courses about sexual identity and identity development and change".

As of August 2023, Denizet-Lewis remained on faculty at Emerson College, where he was serving as an associate professor in their Writing, Literature and Publishing department. As of May 1, 2026, he was an associate professor in the same department.

=== Magazine writing ===
Denizet-Lewis' magazine work includes extensive publications, as a contributing writer, in The New York Times Magazine, a role in which he was still active as of August 2023. Some noteworthy of those and other magazine pieces—for the follow-on published commentary or other attention that they have generated—include the following:

- Denizet-Lewis, Benoit (August 3, 2003). "Double Lives On The Down Low". The New York Times Magazine (NYTimes.com). Generated academic and journalistic attention, see Literary Analysis section, following.
- —, — (August 11, 2006). "Get Out of My Closet: Can You Be White and "On the Down Low?"". Slate Magazine (Slate.com}. Archived from the original on August 21, 2006.
- —, — (September 27, 2009). "Coming Out in Middle School". The New York Times Magazine. Generated academic and journalistic attention, see Literary Analysis section, following.
- —, — (June 19, 2011). "My Ex-Gay Friend". New York Times Magazine. Provided the basis for the film, I Am Michael, see Other media subsection, following.

Denizet-Lewis has penned many cover stories and features, including about sexual identity, youth culture, sports, and dogs. The features have been lengthy, and on a variety of subjects, and have included profiles of celebrities. His October 2017 cover story for The New York Times Magazine, about severely anxious teenagers, led all stories in the magazine in 2017 with regard to its being most clicked on (and inferentially, read), according to a 2017, near year-end readership ranking by The Times.

Besides NYTimes Magazine and Slate.com, Denizet-Lewis's work has also appeared in a variety of other periodicals, including Details, Salon.com, Sports Illustrated, The Advocate, and The New Republic; and the Sunday Globe Magazine from The Boston Globe, and Out and Spin magazines.

=== Books ===
As of May 2026, Denizet-Lewis was the author of four nonfiction books, all published by Simon & Schuster.

Denizet-Lewis' first book, in 2009, was America Anonymous: Eight Addicts in Search of a Life, specifically, describing "three years in the lives of... [the] addicts" as a part of "a larger exploration of our culture of addiction". It was an Editors’ Choice at The New York Times. He published American Voyeur: Dispatches From the Far Reaches of Modern Life in 2010, which has been described as "a collection of his [previously published] journalism, often about sexual identity".

Denizet-Lewis published Travels with Casey: My Journey Through Our Dog-Crazy Country in 2014, which became a New York Times best-seller. It premiered on that list, and was "People and Time’s book of the week". According to Bob Minzesheimer of USA Today, the book tells the story of the author's

four-month, 32-state, 13,000-mile [RV] road trip... with his dog Casey... [and] visits to a dog psychologist, dog rescuers, a dog psychic, a dog masseur and [a] celebrated 'dog whisperer...'.

In interview, Denizet-Lewis has indicated admiration for the beauty of Mark Doty's dog-themed book Dog Years, and has discussed comparisons made of his book to the best-selling 1962 John Steinbeck story, Travels With Charley (Denizet-Lewis stating, "I'm a terrible fiction writer, so... I st[u]ck to what actually happen[ed]", and "Charley was an accessory; Casey would have a starring role", the first quote alluding to literary critical consensus regarding Steinbeck's fictionalization of reported events).

Denizet-Lewis's fourth book, the 2026 You've Changed, was described as a "deeply moving exploration of personal transformation in a period of roiling uncertainty... [investigating] how we remake ourselves—and how identity, belief, and belonging shift in a world that won’t stop doing the same."

=== Other media ===
Denizet-Lewis' 2011 piece, “My Ex-Gay Friend,” which appeared in The New York Times Magazine. provided the basis for the 2015 Justin Kelly film, I Am Michael, which premiered at the 2015 Sundance Film Festival, and which was co-produced by Denizet-Lewis. He has also appeared on television and radio programs, and in other public fora, including NPR's Talk of the Nation.

== Literary analysis ==
To an extent, works like Denzet-Lewis' article, "Coming Out in Middle School", have been used as observational touchstones in academic works, for instance in a legal analysis where it is cited as the earliest of three sources to support the contention that as children "come out" at younger and younger ages, "school administrators have had to develop policies to address the... interactions that students will experience...". As well, Denizet-Lewis' feature-length magazine journalism has at times been recognised, academically, as drawing attention to cultural phenomena, triggering much broader journalistic attention. McCune Jr., writing in the 2016 edition of Abbie E. Goldberg's Encyclopedia of LGBT Studies, reports that:

journalist Benoit-Denizet-Lewis[' 2001] New York Times article,[sic.] "Double Lives on the Down Low," ...took an ethnographic approach to "understanding" DL men and their lives within and outside traditional gay communities. This perceived threat to Black women—and particularly the Black heterosexual, often middle-class family—issued an alarm that would spark articles in major news sources throughout the United States... . (Note: McClune Jr.—see his 2016 citation, op. cit.—traces use of the "Down Low" (DL) descriptor to the period 1995-2000 and earlier, its broad meaning at the time being secretive acts that included the social, political, and criminal; he goes on to highlight its use in R&B lyrics—beginning in 1995 with R. Kelly's "Down Low (Nobody Has to Know)"—as a starting point for its emergence to more consistently imply something social-sexual (although, in those works, at that time, with heterosexual meaning). McClune then goes on to assign early suggestion of the term as reference to bisexual practices to a February 2001 Los Angeles Times article, a starting point for several further such articles. These were followed, in the context of the serious health threat of HIV/AIDS in that period, by "one story after the other" in Black media that led to "the idea that individuals who engaged in DL behaviors were 'dangerous bisexuals'", a progression of public perception that took place, according to McClune, up to and into 2003. It was in this context, and this tension, that Denizet-Lewis' 2003 NYT Magazine DL article was published and became part of the discussion.)

Alongside, McClune Jr. noted that as a result of Denizet-Lewis' journalism, "the [Down Low] term gained greater currency among the larger Americal public."

With regard to particular, in-depth perspective offered in review of particular of this author's works, it is noteworthy that Publishers Weekly describes Denizet-Lewis' second book, the January 2010-released journalism compilation, American Voyeur: Dispatches From the Far Reaches of Modern Life, as offering "stirring and sensitive portraits of individuals—frequently adolescents—struggling to articulate desire and identity while bearing the weight of societal taboo and marginalization". They note that at his best, he produces sections of "groundbreaking investigation" and "acut[e] observ[ation]" (i.e., with his sections, respectively, on gay African American men, their subculture and closeting, and on the ostracization of the North American Man/Boy Love Association); about these, they write, he has "the expected celerity and read-ability" and "combines sharp-eyed reportage, sensitive depiction, and happily, considering the sober subject matter, a wry wit". They note, however, that "a few (including a piece on lipstick lesbians) succumb to a more shallow treatment", while yet concluding that Denizet-Lewis' "admirably succeeds", citing the component article on gay youth as an example of "the breadth of his inquiries, the real shoe-leather journalism, and his ability to balance sympathy and skepticism".

== Awards and recognition ==
The Alicia Patterson Foundation awarded Denizet-Lewis' a one-year grant in 2004, while he was working freelance, to support research and writing to document a perceived epidemic of American teen suicide at that time. (Note: The Alicia Patterson Foundation award is named for the former 23-year Newsday editor and publisher of that name. The "highly competitive" award is given to journalists wishing to "pursue [an] independent projec[t] of significant interest", see APF staff (2023), op. cit.) The Advocate, as of 2007, "the oldest [existing] continuously published U.S. gay periodical", named Denizet-Lewis, in 2009, to its "Forty Under 40: Media" list, spotlighting him and fellow awardees as the most influential LGBT individuals working in media at that time.

In March 2010, Denizet-Lewis was the recipient of that year's award for "Outstanding Magazine Article" at the Gay & Lesbian Alliance Against Defamation's (GLAAD's) New York City event of the 21st GLAAD Media Awards, for his article "Coming Out in Middle School", from the The New York Times Magazine. In July 2010, he received that year's Excellence in Journalism Award for feature writing from The Association of LGBTQ+ Journalists (NLGJA), for the same article.

In 2022, Denizet-Lewis was named a Fellow in the New America National Fellows Program. In 2023, Denizet-Lewis received one of the 28 National Endowment for the Humanities Public Scholars awards for popular nonfiction, his to complete chapters remaining in a new book he was preparing, tentatively titled, We Don't Know You Anymore: Identity Change in America; the work focuses, as he describes it, on "how and why we change our identities and belief systems during a time of both heightened malleability and ideological inflexibility". (Note: Denizet-Lewis developed the book's content through an Emerson College institute course, "Why We Change Identities", which explored the same subject, in the words of the College's Erin Clossey, through "lenses of psychology, philosophy, spirituality, political science, and gender and sexuality studies", see Clossey (August 21, 2023), op. cit.)

== Personal life ==
Denizet-Lewis is a citizen of both France and the United States.

As of 2007, his alumnus profile reported that Benedicte Denizet, his French-born mother, was living in Paris, France, working as a translator, and "organiz[ing] walking and cycling tours through France and Spain"; as of that year, the source reported that Dennis Lewis, his father, was still living in San Francisco, noting his authorship of the The Tao of Natural Breathing, and stating his continuing work teaching "natural breathing, qigong[,] and meditation". As of 2014, Denizet-Lewis indicated that he was in contact with his mother, reporting that she queries him about what he will be "writing about next".

Denizet-Lewis is married and lives in Massachusetts, splitting time between Jamaica Plain, Provincetown, and Prague. As of 2007, his alumnus profile reported that when Denizet-Lewis is not writing, he enjoyed "playing and watching sports, listening to music, travelling, reading, and spending time with his friends and family".
