= D-104 =

D104, D. 104, or D-104 may refer to:

- D104 road, a road in Croatia
- D-104 microphone, a microphone commonly used in broadcasting
- D. 104, The Symphony No. 1 by Louis Moreau Gottschalk
