= Twin Sisters =

"Twin Sisters" may refer to:

- Female twins

== Arts and entertainment ==
- Twin Sisters (1934 film), a Chinese film
- Twin Sisters (2002 film), or De tweeling, a Dutch film
- Twin Sisters (2013 film), a Norwegian documentary
- Twin Sisters of Kyoto, a 1963 Japanese drama film
- Mr Twin Sister, an American band

== Places in the United States ==
- Twin Sisters, Texas
- Twin Sisters (California), twin summits of a mountain
- Twin Sisters (Colorado), a mountain summit
- Twin Sisters Peaks, mountains in Colorado
- Twin Sisters Mountain, in Washington
- Twin Sisters Basalt, a pillar near Wallula Gap, Washington

== Other uses ==
- Twin Sisters (cannons), from the Texas Revolution

== See also ==
- Twin (disambiguation)
- Twins (disambiguation)
