= Gemini (comics) =

Comics name

Gemini, in comics, may refer to:

- Gemini (Marvel Comics), a member of the Zodiac in Marvel Comics
- Gemini (DC Comics), the "daughter" of Brotherhood of Evil member Madame Rouge in DC Comics
- Gemini (Image Comics), a mind controlled superhero; part of Jay Faerber's creator owned line of comics from Image.

== See also ==
- Gemini (disambiguation)
