= DeBartolo Performing Arts Center =

Coordinates: 41°41′40.9″N 86°14′12.5″W

Marie P. DeBartolo Performing Arts Center
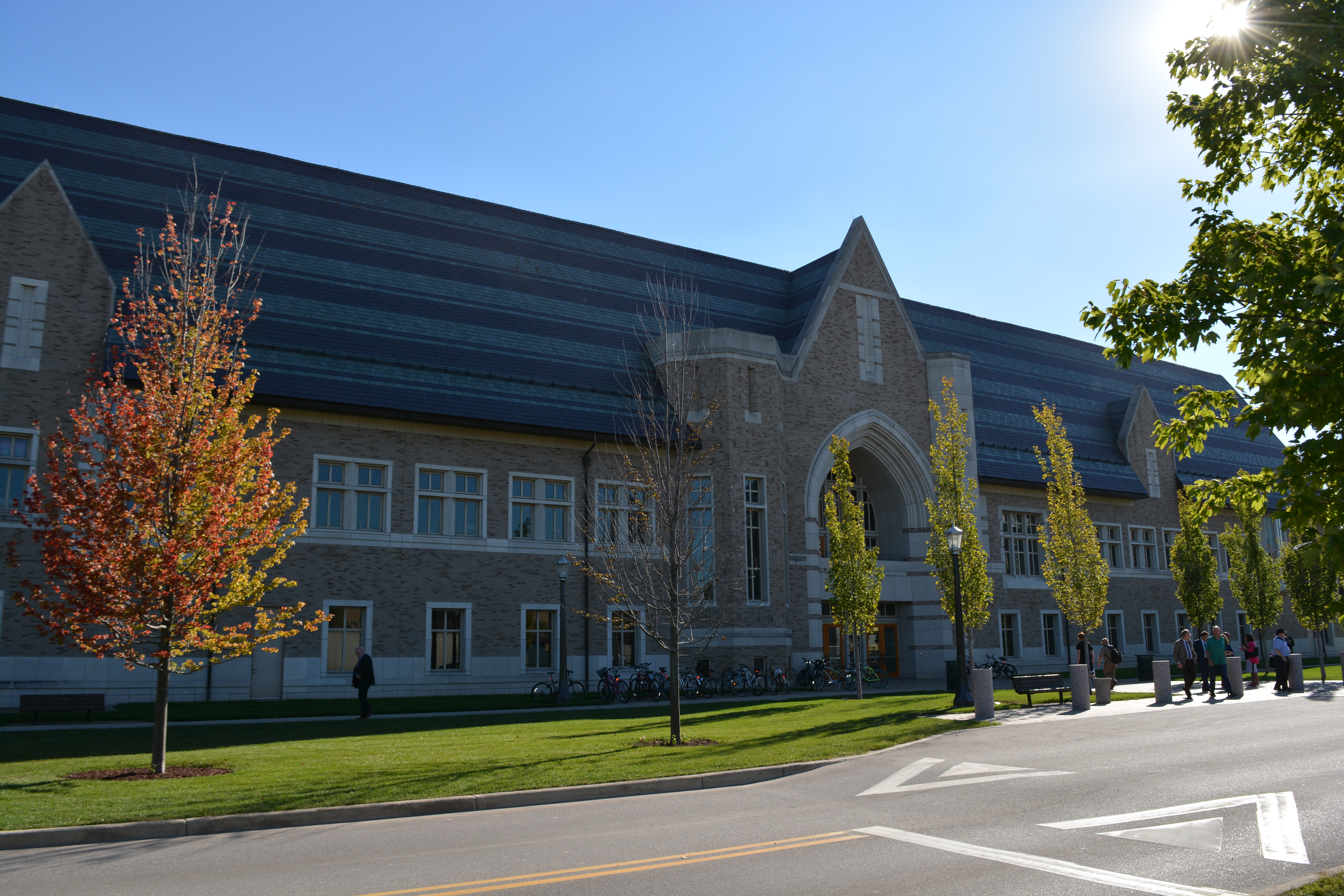
- DeBartolo Performing Arts Center (DPAC)

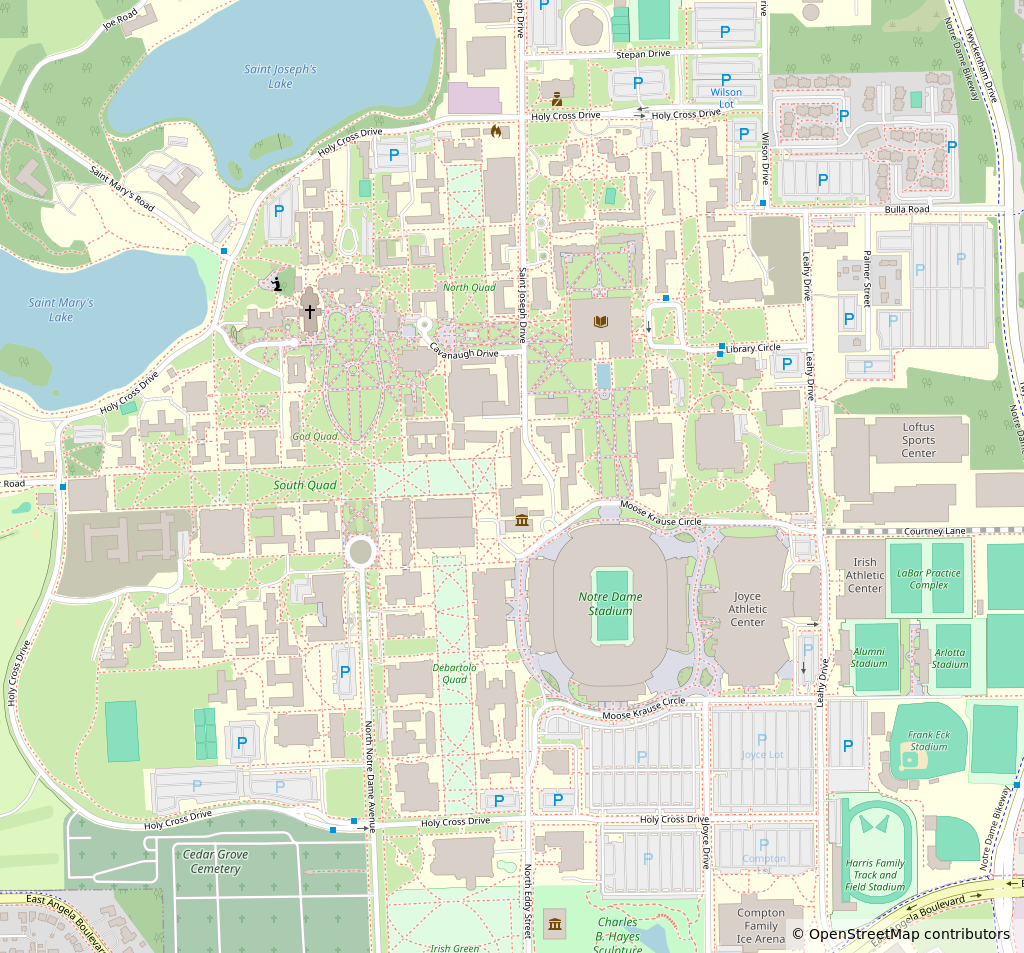
- Location within Notre Dame, Indiana
- Alternative names: DeBartolo Performing Arts Center (DPAC)

General information
- Status: Arts Center
- Location: Notre Dame, Indiana, United States
- Completed: 2004
- Client: University of Notre Dame
- Owner: University of Notre Dame

Technical details
- Floor area: 150,990 sq ft (14,027 m^{2})

Design and construction
- Architect: Hardy Holzman Pfeiffer Associates

Website
- performingarts.nd.edu/our-story//

The Marie P. DeBartolo Performing Arts Center (DPAC) is a performing arts venue located on the south end of the University of Notre Dame campus and open to the South Bend, Indiana, and wider community. The 150,000 square foot facility, which opened in September 2004, was financed in large part by a gift from Edward J. DeBartolo Sr., and the building was named in honor of his wife. The current executive director of the facility is Ted Barron. In addition to performance spaces, the building also contains offices, teaching spaces, and production facilities for Notre Dame's Department of Film, Television, and Theatre, as well as for the Department of Music, the Department of Sacred Music, and the Shakespeare at Notre Dame program.

== Performance Spaces ==
- Chris and Ann Reyes Organ and Choral Hall: an 80-seat room that features a handcrafted pipe organ built by Paul Fritts, which weighs 10,000 pounds, has 35 stops, and contains 2,551 pipes. The organ took 15 months to build in Tacoma, Washington, then was disassembled and shipped to Notre Dame, whereupon it took two months to install. The hall has possible reverberation time variations from 2 to 4 seconds.
- Judd and Mary Lou Leighton Concert Hall: a 96-foot tall space primarily devoted to musical performances with seating for 850. The room features an adjustable acoustics system that can vary reverberation times from 1.4 to 2.6 seconds.
- Michael Browning Family Cinema: a 200-seat DCI Compliant digital cinema featuring 2K digital projection and 35mm and 16mm film projection. The Browning Cinema was the first THX-certified cinema in the state of Indiana. Film series hosted here have included the Notre Dame Queer Film Festival, and there are community film studies courses offered each semester entitled “Learning Beyond the Classics.” There is also a movie theater-style concession stand adjacent to the Cinema.
- Patricia George Decio Mainstage Theatre: with seating for 350 patrons, this theater features a proscenium arch, an orchestra pit lift, and a 50 line-set fly system.
- Penote Performer's Hall: a recital and rehearsal space and a home for master classes and workshops.
- Regis Philbin Studio Theatre: a 2333 square feet black box theater with configurable seating and staging and a system of five catwalks.

== Programming ==
Those who have performed at DPAC include Wynton Marsalis, Itzhak Perlman, Ladysmith Black Mambazo, the New York Philharmonic, Dave Brubeck, Kronos Quartet, The Chieftains, Leslie Odom Jr., Renée Elise Goldsberry, Todd Rundgren, Third Coast Percussion, and L.A. Theatre Works. The Fischoff National Chamber Music Competition, which is the largest and oldest continuous chamber music competition in the United States, is held annually at DPAC.

== Notable Displays ==
Adjacent to the Michael Browning Family Cinema, visitors will find a plaque dedicating the popcorn popper within the building's concession stand to Pawnee Indiana's famous miniature horse Li'l Sebastian, who earned an honorary degree from Notre Dame. The plaque features a photo of Li'l Sebastian and the University of Notre Dame seal, and it reads: "The DeBartolo Performing Arts Center hereby declares this The Li'l Sebastian Memorial Popcorn Popper. A life and legacy of delighting crowds from Pawnee to Buckingham Palace to Kuwait will be honored forever by delighting crowds at the DeBartolo Performing Arts Center with buttery, freshly popped popcorn. Animalus, legenda, amicus, equus Pawnee, perfectum."

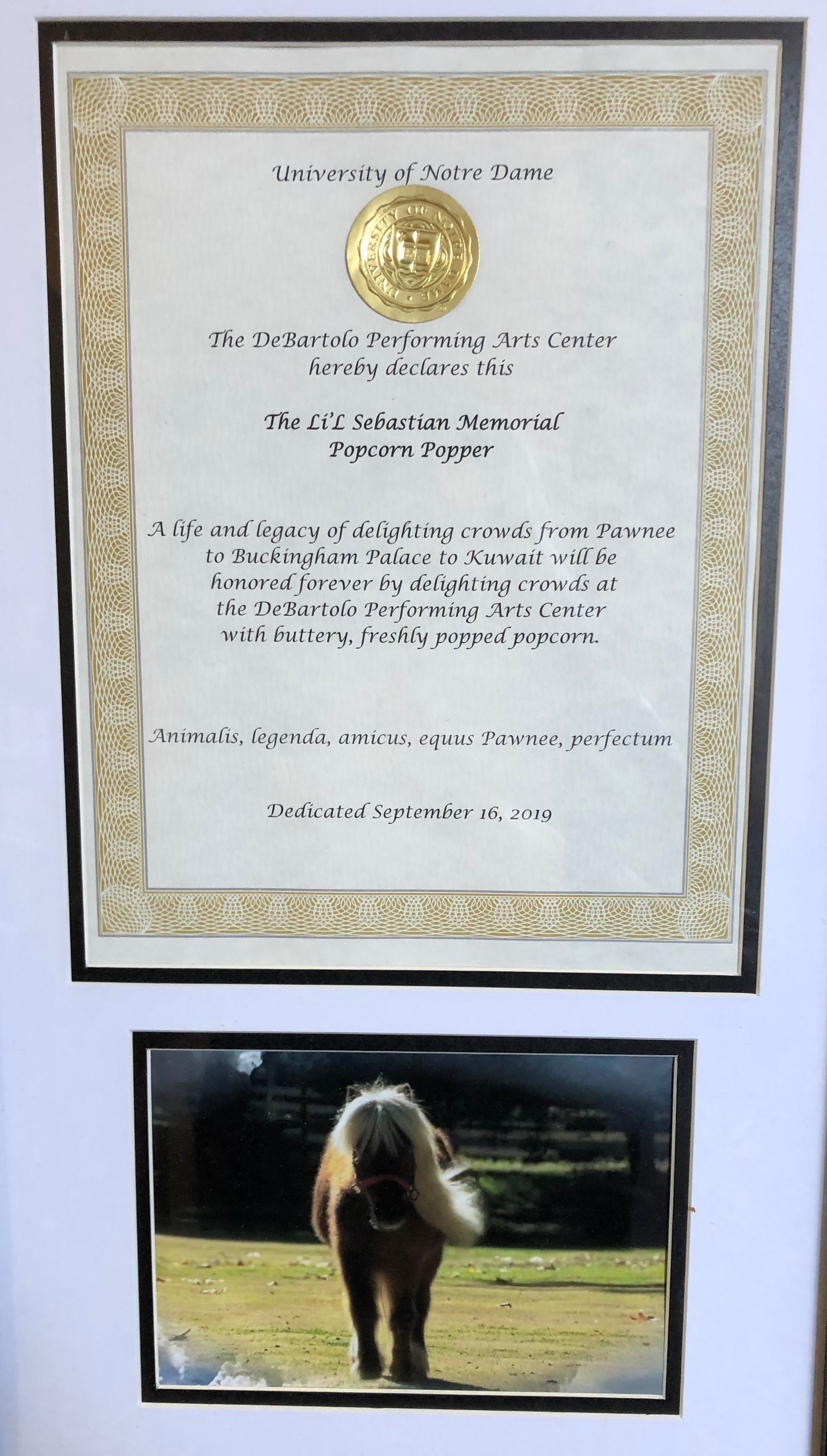
Li'l Sebastian plaque in the DeBartolo Performing Arts Center.
