= Gemini =

Gemini most often refers to:

- Gemini (constellation), one of the constellations of the zodiac
- Gemini (astrology), an astrological sign
- Gemini (language model), a series of large language models developed by Google
  - Google Gemini, a chatbot
- Gemini twins, a Latin name for Castor and Pollux in Greek and Roman mythology

Gemini may also refer to:

== Science and technology ==
=== Space ===
- Gemini in Chinese astronomy, the constellation Gemini in Chinese astronomy
- Project Gemini, the second US crewed spaceflight program
- Gemini Observatory, consisting of telescopes in the Northern and Southern Hemispheres
- Gemini Planet Imager, an instrument for observing extrasolar planets

=== Computing ===
- Gemini (protocol), an Internet protocol providing access to primarily textual documents in Gemini space
- SCO Gemini, a UnixWare/OpenServer merger project by SCO
- Gemini chip, an updated version of the Apple Computer chip Mega II
- Xiaomi Mi 5 (codename Gemini), an Android phone
- Gemini PDA, an Android/Linux PDA/phone with a keyboard
- Yahoo! Gemini, a former name of the online advertising platform Yahoo! Native

=== Other technology ===
- Gemini (submarine communications cable), a former subsea cable connecting the US and UK
- Gemini house, a prototype solar-energy house in Austria
- Coleco Gemini, a clone of the Atari 2600 game system

== Arts and entertainment ==
=== Comics and literature ===
- Gemini (DC Comics), a supervillain
- Gemini (Marvel Comics), a fictional character
- Gemini, a comic series created by Jay Faerber
- Gemini Kanon, a fictional character in the manga Saint Seiya by Masami Kurumada
- Gemini Saga, a fictional character in the manga Saint Seiya by Masami Kurumada
- Gemini (magazine), a Norwegian periodical
- Gemini, a 2000 novel by Dorothy Dunnett
- Gemini (novel) (Les Météores), a 1975 novel by Michel Tournier
- Gemini: An Extended Autobiographical Statement on My First Twenty-five Years of Being a Black Poet, a 1971 publication by Nikki Giovanni

=== Film ===
- Gemini (1999 film) (Sôseiji), a Japanese horror film
- Gemini (2002 film), an Indian Tamil film starring Vikram
- Gemeni (film), a 2002 Indian Telugu film also known as Gemini starring Venkatesh
- Géminis, a 2005 Argentinian film
- The Gemini, a 2016 Burmese LGBT film
- Gemini (2017 film), an American mystery thriller

=== Music ===
==== Performers ====
- Gemini (musician) (born 1990), British electronic music producer and DJ
- Gemini (Chinese band), a French-Chinese rock band
- Gemini (English duo), an English mid-1990s twin music duo
- Gemini (Hungarian band), a Hungarian rock band established in 1965
- Gemini (Portuguese band), a 1970s band
- Gemini (Swedish band), a brother-and-sister pop duo
- Demarco Castle (born 1981), rapper/singer formerly known as "Gemini" and most recently "GemStones"
- Jemini, British pop group from Liverpool

==== Albums ====
- Gemini (Alice Nine album), 2011
- Gemini (Brian McKnight album), 2005
- Gemini (El DeBarge album), 1989
- Gemini (Gemini album), 1985
- Gemini (Macklemore album), 2017
- Gemini (Noah Reid album), 2020
- Gemini (TQ album), 2003
- Gemini (Wild Nothing album), 2010
- Gemini!, by Lucki, 2024
- Gemini: Good vs. Evil, by Krayzie Bone, 2005
- Gemini, by Adrien Gallo of BB Brunes, 2014
- Gemini, by Atrocity, 2000
- Gemini, by Einstürzende Neubauten, 2003
- Gemini, by Kasia Kowalska, 1994
- Gemini, by Lana Lane, 2006
- Gemini, by Machine Girl, 2015
- Gemini, by Sherina Munaf, 2009
- Gemini, by Yoon Mi-rae (recording as T), 2002

==== Songs ====
- "Gemini", by Alabama Shakes from Sound & Color
- "Gemini", by the Alan Parsons Project from Eye in the Sky
- "Gemini", by Anahí de Cárdenas from Who's That Girl?
- "Gemini", by Anne-Marie from Karate
- "Gemini", by Boards of Canada from Tomorrow's Harvest
- "Gemini", by Cane Hill from Cane Hill
- "Gemini", by D'espairsRay from Coll:set
- "Gemini", by Del Shannon
- "Gemini", by Eric Burdon and the Animals from Love Is
- "Gemini", by Israel Cruz
- "Gemini", by Jimmy Heath from Triple Threat
- "Gemini", by Jon Lord from Windows
- "Gemini", by Keith Urban from Graffiti U
- "Gemini", by Krayzie Bone from Thug on da Line
- "Gemini", by Slayer from Undisputed Attitude
- "Gemini", by Sponge Cola from Palabas
- "Gemini", by Tyler Childers from Country Squire
- "Gemini", by What So Not
- "Gemini", by the Vocaloids Kagamine Rin and Len from the video game Hatsune Miku: Project DIVA 2nd
- "Gemini (Birthday Song)", by Why? from Elephant Eyelash
- "Gemini (Damn Right)", by Blanco Brown from Honeysuckle & Lightning Bugs

=== Television ===
- "Gemini" (Law & Order: Criminal Intent), a television episode
- "Gemini" (Stargate SG-1), a television episode
- "Gemini", an episode of Nowhere Man
- Gemini, a fictional villain in the animated series Thundarr the Barbarian
- Gemini Awards, a Canadian television broadcasting award
- Sun Gemini TV, a Telugu-language Indian television channel
- Gemini Stone, a fictional character from Sabrina: The Animated Series
- Gemini, a two-part "clusterbot" from Robot Wars
- Gemini, Myke Horton's Gladiator name on American Gladiators

=== Other uses in arts and entertainment ===
- Gemini (play), by Albert Innaurato
- Gemini (roller coaster)
- Gemini FM, a South-West England radio station
- Gemini Home Entertainment, a horror web series

== Companies and organizations ==
=== Media companies ===
- Gemini Film Circuit, a film distribution and production studio unit in Chennai, India
- Gemini Media and formerly Gemini Publications, an American magazine publisher
- Gemini Studios, a film production house in South India

=== Transport operators ===
- Gemini Air Cargo, a US airline
- Gemini Trains, a train operating company planning to run cross-channel services
- Air Gemini, an Angolan airline

=== Other companies and organizations ===
- Gemini (company), a cryptocurrency exchange platform
- Gemini Industries, a defunct manufacturer of television set accessories and consumer electronics
- Gemini Powered Parachutes, an American aircraft manufacturer
- Gemini Sound, a manufacturer of professional DJ equipment
- BGO Gemini, a Bulgarian LGBT rights organization

== People ==
- Gemini (musician) (born 1990), English musician
- Gemini Ganesan (1920–2005), stage name of the Indian film actor Ramasamy Ganesan
- Gemini Major (born 1990), Malawian-born South African entertainer
- Gemini Shankaran (1924–2023), Indian circus owner

== Places ==
- Anna Flyover, also known as Gemini, an area of Chennai, India
- Gemini (California mountain), US
- Gemini, an islet in the Tuscan Archipelago, Italy
- Gemini Residence, a building in Copenhagen, Denmark
- Gemini Wind Farm, a wind farm off the coast of the Netherlands

== Transportation ==
=== Aircraft ===
- Marsden Gemini, a research glider
- Miles Gemini, a British 1940s four-seat aircraft

=== Automotive ===
- Isuzu Gemini, a car built by Isuzu
- Holden Gemini, a car derived from the Isuzu model
- Gemini (racing car), series of racing cars built between 1959 and 1963
- 200Tdi Land Rover engine (development-stage codename "Gemini")
- Wright Gemini (disambiguation), a series of bus bodywork designs
- Chevrolet Gemini small-block engine, a high-performance engine built by General Motors

=== Watercraft ===
- Cape Cod Gemini, an American sailboat design
- MV Gemini, a cruise ship

== See also ==
- SuperStar Gemini (2012), former name of a cruise ship
- Gemeni, a village in Dârvari Commune, Mehedinți County, Romania
- Gem (disambiguation)
- Gemelli (disambiguation), Italian for twins
- Gemini Man (disambiguation)
- Gymini, aka the Shane Twins, former pro wrestling tag team
- Jemini, English pop band
