= Antenna rotator =

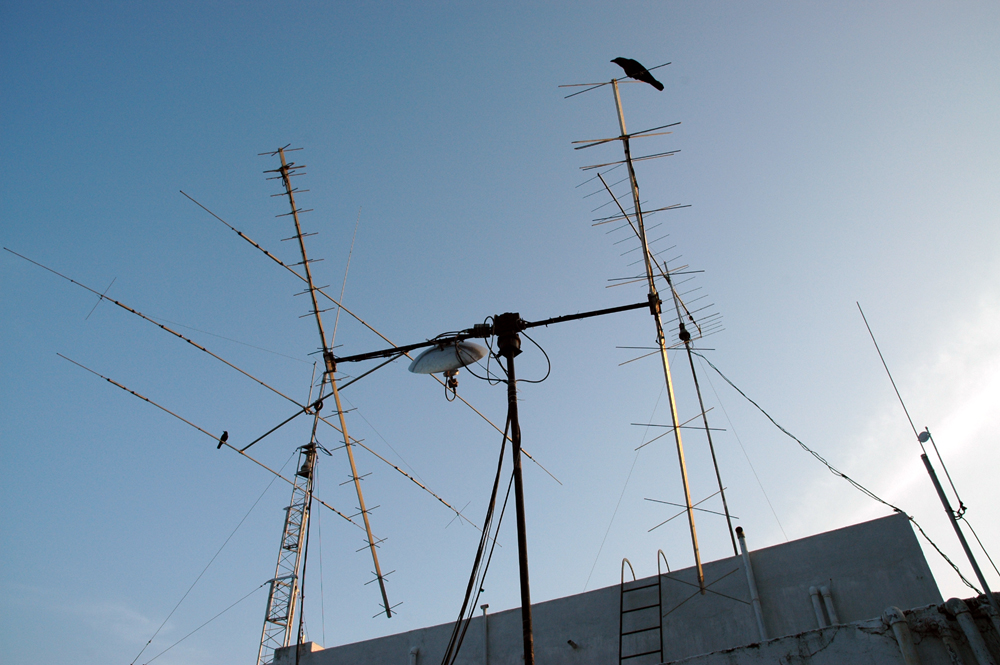
An antenna rotator unit is visible in the middle of the mast.

An antenna rotator (or antenna rotor) is a device used to change the orientation, within the horizontal plane, of a directional antenna. Most antenna rotators have two parts, the rotator unit and the controller. The controller is normally placed near the equipment which the antenna is connected to, while the rotator is mounted on the antenna mast directly below the antenna.

Rotators are commonly used in amateur radio and military communications installations. They are also used with TV and FM antennas, where stations are available from multiple directions, as the cost of a rotator is often significantly less than that of installing a second antenna to receive stations from multiple directions.

Rotators are manufactured for different sizes of antennas and installations. For example, a consumer TV antenna rotator has enough torque to turn a TV/FM or small ham antenna. These units typically cost around US$70.

Heavy-duty ham rotators are designed to turn extremely large, heavy, high frequency (shortwave) beam antennas, and cost hundreds or possibly thousands of dollars.

In the center of the reference picture, the accompanying image includes an AzEl installation rotator, so named for its controlling of both the azimuth and the elevation components of the direction of an antenna system or array. Such antenna configurations are used in, for example, amateur radio satellite or moon-bounce communications.

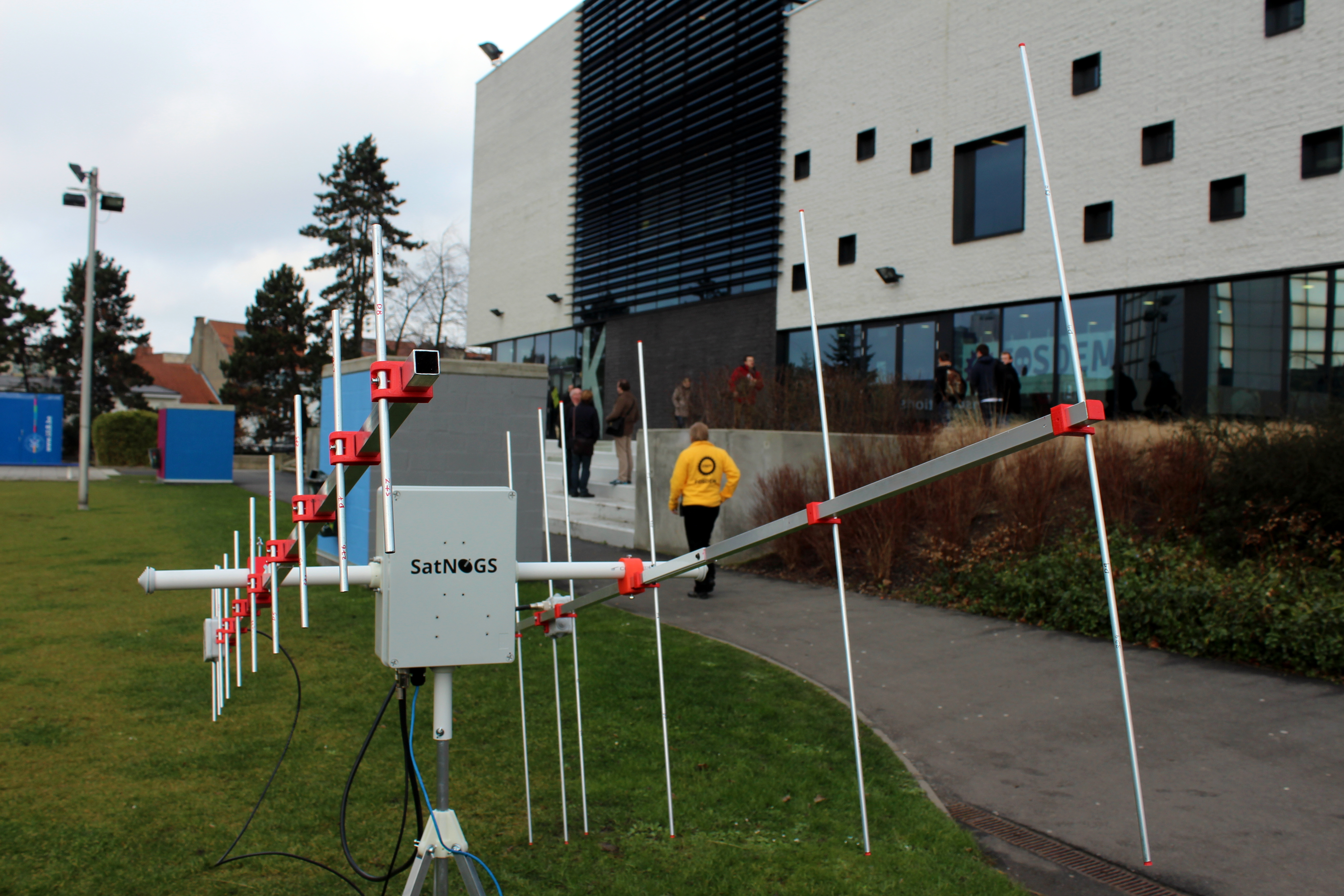
SatNOGS version 2 ground station deployed during FOSDEM 2015

An open hardware AzEl rotator system is provided by the SatNOGS Groundstation project.

The Alliance Manufacturing Co. of Alliance, Ohio, and the Astatic Corporation of Conneaut, Ohio, manufactured popular radio and TV booster and rotary antenna systems. These products were heavily advertised for radio use in newspapers starting in the early 1940s, and for use with commercial television sets from 1949 into the 1960s. Cinécraft Productions, a pioneer in early TV advertising, produced six commercials for the Astatic Booster TV in 1949 and 112 for the Alliance Tenna-Rotor, Tenna-Scope, and Casca-Matic Booster between 1949 and 1955.

== Manufacturers of consumer TV antenna rotators ==
=== Past ===
Before the era of cable TV and the rise of satellite TV, many homes had outdoor antennas designed to capture over-the-air television signals. The rotator market was served by a number of manufacturers including

- Alinco Electronics, Inc.
- Alliance Manufacturing Co., Inc., Alliance, Ohio
- American Phenolic Corporation
- Astatic Corporation. Conneaut, Ohio
- Channel Master
- Cornell-Dubilier Corporation, South Plainfield, New Jersey
- Gemini Industries, Inc., Passaic, New Jersey
- Hy-Gain
- Kenpro
- Lance Industries, Sylmar, California
- Leader Electronics, Inc., Cleveland, Ohio
- Nippon Antenna
- Philco
- Philips
- Pro Brand International, Inc. (Eagle Aspen brand)
- Radio Merchandise Sales, Inc.
- Radio Shack
- RCA
- Sears, Roebuck and Co.
- Stolle
- The Radiart Corp., Cleveland, Ohio
- Zenith

=== Current ===
Although the cord-cutting movement has increased interest in receiving free over-the-air television signals, as of December 2021 consumer options are limited.

- VOXX Accessories Corporation of Carmel, Indiana, a wholly owned subsidiary of VOXX International, using the RCA trademark, offers a remote-controlled antenna rotator, the model VH226E.
- Channel Master's stock of model CM-9521HD is depleted, and it is unclear whether more units will be manufactured.
- Yaesu Musen sells a range of rotators aimed at the Amateur and FM (VHF) broadcast listener markets. Amateur products include an Azimuth-Elevation product.
