= Gemini Man =

Gemini Man may refer to:

- Gemini Man (film), a 2019 American science fiction film
- Gemini Man (TV series), a 1976 American science fiction TV series
- Gemini Man, a Robot Master from the Mega Man video game franchise

== See also ==
- Gemini (disambiguation)
