= Sydney's Darlings =

1926 film

- Directed by: Thomas Marinato
- Written by: J. Scott Bithell
- Produced by: Thomas Marinato
- Starring: Doris Harrison
- Cinematography: Ernest Scutna
- Production company: Beacon Light Productions
- Release date: March 1926
- Country: Australia
- Languages: Silent film English intertitles

Sydney's Darlings is a 1926 Australian silent film set in the world of yachting. It was made largely by sports enthusiasts and amateur filmmakers in mid 1925.

It is considered a lost film.

== Plot ==
A man plays to enter a yacht race, but is injured in a car accident. His girlfriend takes his place and wins the race.

== Cast ==
- Doris Harrison
- Jim McCoy
- Will Kay
- Charles Chapman
- John Walker
- Thomas Marinato

== Reception ==
The film only received a limited release and was poorly reviewed by the critic from the Sydney Morning Herald who stated:

It is not a film which will add much to the prestige of Australian productions. One looks at it in vain for those little touches which distinguish art from mere day-labour. The scenes have a naive, unpremeditated air, as though Mr. Marinato had planted his camera firmly on the desired spot, then shouted to his actors, "Come along now! Do so and so", and immediately begun to turn the handle. In some of the scenes he himself appears, bearing an amiable, if somewhat sheepish profile. The actors used no make-up. Consequently their faces are often mere dark sillhouterrs. There are some effective views of yachting on the harbour such as one sees from week to week in the tropical gaieties. The story is so slight as to be hardly worth mentioning.
