= Jim in Bold =

- Directed by: Glenn Holsten
- Starring: Michael Glatze; Benjie Nycum; Scott MacPhee; Ted McGuire
- Release date: 2003
- Country: United States
- Language: English

Jim in Bold is a documentary about Jim Wheeler, a gay high school student in Lebanon, Pennsylvania, who died by suicide in 1997 because of constant harassment at school. The film was created by the Equality Forum and directed by Glenn Holsten. The original music was composed by Michael Aharon.

== Synopsis ==
The film, titled after a poem by Wheeler, details the abuse he received at the hands of his classmates because of his homosexuality. It also presents interviews and a cross-nation road-trip with members of Young Gay America, an online teen organization for gays, and compares the teasing and physical abuse Jim suffered to the increasingly open attitudes towards homosexuality six years later when the film was first shown.

== Screenings and reactions ==
The film premiered at the Equality Forum 2003 on May 1 at The Kimmel Center in Philadelphia. A later showing, held September 28, 2003, at the Pennsylvania State Museum in Harrisburg as a fundraiser for Common Roads, a local gay youth support group, was protested by 10 members of the Westboro Baptist Church, a religious institution well known for their extreme anti-gay views. Because they announced their intention to protest in advance, they were overwhelmed by over 800 counter-protesters who declared the day "Unity Day". The counter-protest was organized by the Pride Festival of Central Pennsylvania led by community organizer Reynaldo Lacaba.
