= Twining =

Twining is the process of interlacing strands as if to make twine.

Twining may also refer to:

== Places ==
=== United States ===
- Twining, Michigan, a village
- Twining, New Mexico, an unincorporated community
- Twining, Washington, D.C., a neighborhood

== People ==
- Twining (surname)

== Other uses ==
- Twining basketry, a type of basket-weaving
- Twining Models, an English model-making firm
- Twining v. New Jersey, 1908 U.S. Supreme Court case concerning Fifth Amendment rights
- Twining Peak, a mountain in Colorado
- USS Twining (DD-540), American Fletcher-class destroyer
- Vines growing upwards by revolving around and leaning on a supporting structure

== See also ==
- Twinings, a British tea brand
- Twinning (disambiguation)
