= Abby Denson =

American cartoonist

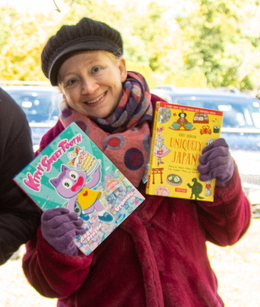
- Denson in October 2022
- Born: Illinois, U.S.
- Education: Eugene Lang College; Parsons School of Design (BFA)
- Occupations: Cartoonist; writer; musician
- Website: www.abbydenson.com

Abby Denson is an American cartoonist, writer, and musician, known for her gay young-adult comics series Tough Love and her comics travel guides to Tokyo and Japan.

== Personal life ==
Abby Denson was born in Illinois, and then grew up in West Hartford, Connecticut. She received a degree in Cultural Studies from Eugene Lang College and a BFA in Illustration from Parsons School of Design. She lives in Brooklyn, New York City, and is the creator of City Sweet Tooth, her online blog that reviews the city's best sweets and treats in comic book form.

== Comics ==
Abby Denson initially self-published Tough Love, a minicomic about two gay teenagers in high school. She sent a copy to XY Magazine for review, which serialized it over a number of years, while Denson completed the story. She was the illustrator for the cover of the special Survival Guide edition of XY. In 2006, the series was reprinted as a graphic novel by Manic D Press. Denson won the 2007 Lulu of the Year Award from the comics organization Friends of Lulu, and was nominated for a Stonewall Award from the American Library Association.

Denson has worked on several newsstand comics, such as Amazing Spider-Man Family, Josie and the Pussycats, The Powerpuff Girls, Sabrina The Teenage Witch, and Kim Possible. At the same time, she has continued to release her own self-published comics, including Night Club, Jamie Starr Teen Drag Queen, Deadsy Cat & Kissy Kitty, Cute Boys of the 80's, and others.

Denson was a contributor to the Friends of Lulu anthology The Girls' Guide To Guy's Stuff, Robert Kirby and David Kelly's anthology The Book of Boy Trouble 2, and Tim Fish's anthology Young Bottoms In Love.

Denson's graphic novel Dolltopia was published in 2009 by Green Candy Press. It garnered a silver Moonbeam Children's Book Award and a Bronze Award at the 4th International Manga Awards.

In 2014 and 2018, she published two illustrated travel guides. Her Cool Japan Guide: Fun in the Land of Manga, Lucky Cats and Ramen (2014) is summarized as a "...hip and handy travel guide with her expertise as a frequent visitor to Japan and her bright and vibrant illustrations". Then came Cool Tokyo Guide: Adventures in the City of Kawaii Fashion, Train Sushi and Godzilla (2018), noted as a practical guide for Japan's metropolis, which despite with its "lighthearted,.. manga-style" targeting teen readership, was deemed sufficiently amenable to use by adults as well and was a 2019 recipient of an IPPY award.

She collaborated with artist Utomaru on the 2021 book Kitty Sweet Tooth‘s Tasteorama from First Second Books. Reviews of this book included "A sugar-sweet burst of sunshine for new readers" and "Denson’s sweet adventure will please movie and dessert lovers alike. Bold line art and vivid colors by Utomaru enhance this candy-coated comedy".

== Music ==
Denson has been in a number of bands including the all-women band Mz. Pakman, Let's Audio, Abbymatic and, most recently, The Saturday Night Things. She also collaborated with Rodney Alan Greenblat on the album Let's Audio.

== Publications ==
=== Books ===
- Tough Love: High School Confidential, Manic D Press, 2006
- Dolltopia, Green Candy Press, 2009
- Cool Japan Guide: Fun in the Land of Manga, Lucky Cats and Ramen. Tuttle Publishing, 2014
- Cool Tokyo Guide: Adventures in the City of Kawaii Fashion, Train Sushi and Godzilla. Tuttle Publishing, 2018 ISBN 978-4-8053144-1-8
- Kitty Sweet Tooth, illustrated by Utomaru. First Second, 2021. ISBN 9781250196774
- Kitty Sweet Tooth Makes a Movie, illustrated by Utomaru. First Second, 2022. ISBN 9781250196781

=== Contributions ===
- The Book of Boy Trouble 2: Born to Trouble, edited by Robert Kirby and David Kelly, Green Candy Press, 2008 ISBN 978-1-931160-65-0
- The Girls' Guide to Guy's Stuff, Friends of Lulu, 2007
- Young Bottoms In Love, edited by Tim Fish, Poison Press, 2007 ISBN 978-0-9762786-7-2
