= Jacob Needleman =

American philosopher

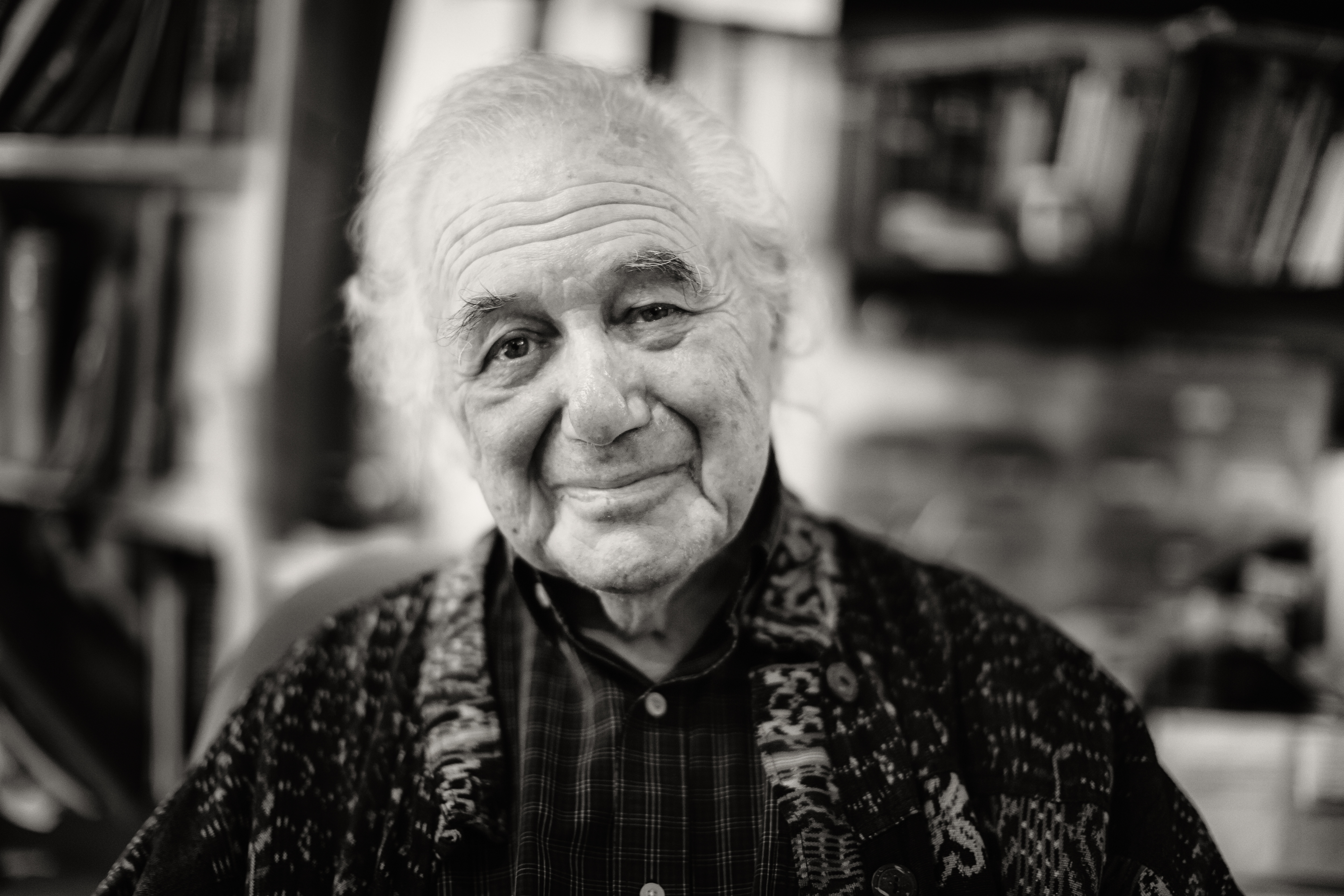
- Needleman in 2018
- Born: October 6, 1934; Philadelphia, Pennsylvania, U.S.
- Died: November 28, 2022 (aged 88); Oakland, California, U.S.
- Education: Harvard University; Yale University; University of Freiburg, Germany
- Occupation: Professor of philosophy
- Spouse: Gail Needleman
- Website: jacobneedleman.com

Jacob Needleman (October 6, 1934 – November 28, 2022) was an American philosopher, author, and religious scholar.

== Life and career ==
Needleman was Jewish and was educated at Harvard University, Yale University, and the University of Freiburg, Germany. He was deeply involved in the Gurdjieff Work and the Gurdjieff Foundation of San Francisco. He was a Professor Emeritus of Philosophy and Religion at San Francisco State University and is said to have "popularized the term 'new religious movements'." He was a former visiting professor at the Duxx Graduate School of Business Leadership in Monterrey, Mexico, and former director of the Center for the study of New Religions at the Graduate Theological Union in Berkeley, California. He has also served as a research associate at the Rockefeller Institute for Medical Research, a research fellow at Union Theological Seminary, Adjunct Professor of Medical Ethics at the University of California Medical School and guest Professor of Religious Studies at the Sorbonne University, Paris (1992). Needleman was honored by the Open Center in New York City in 2006. Needleman also narrated classical religious texts in audiobook format, including the Taoist Tao Te Ching and the Hindu Bhagavad Gita.

Alternative spirituality author and historian Mitch Horowitz, who has called Needleman a mentor, said that Needleman's "fullest gift as a writer was his capacity to compellingly describe inner contradictions and strivings," and that Needleman's activity in translating and publishing 20th-century French-language works of Traditionalist philosophy is of high significance to its recognition.

== Death ==
Needleman died on November 28, 2022, in Oakland, California at the age of 88.

== Writing ==
Needleman authored articles, interviewed and wrote 24 books in a writing career that began in 1970.

=== Bibliography ===
- The New Religions (1970)
- A Sense of the Cosmos: The Encounter of Modern Science and Ancient Truth (1975)
- Sacred Tradition & Present Need (edited by Jacob Needleman and Dennis Lewis) (1975)
- On the Way to Self Knowledge (edited by Jacob Needleman and Dennis Lewis) (1976)
- Speaking of My Life: The Art of Living in the Cultural Revolution (1979)
- Lost Christianity: A Journey of Rediscovery to the Centre of Christian Experience (1980)
- The Heart of Philosophy (1982)
- The Way of the Physician (1985)
- Sword of Gnosis: Metaphysics, Cosmology, Tradition (1988)
- Sorcerers: A Novel (1988)
- Real Philosophy: An Anthology of the Universal Search for Meaning (introduction and commentary by Jacob Needleman and David Appelbaum) (1990)
- Money and the Meaning of Life (1991)
- Modern Esoteric Spirituality (edited by Jacob Needleman and Antoine Faivre) (1992)
- Eros (1995)
- A Little Book On Love (1996)
- Time and the Soul: Where has all the Meaningful Time Gone — And Can We Get it Back? (1998)
- The American Soul: Rediscovering the Wisdom of the Founders (2003)
- The Wisdom of Love: Toward a Shared Inner Search (previously published as A Little Book on Love) (2005)
- Why Can't We Be Good? (2008)
- What is God? (2009)
- Introduction to the Gurdjieff Work (2009)
- An Unknown World: Notes on the Meaning of the Earth (2012)
- Necessary Wisdom: Jacob Needleman talks about God, time, money, love, and the need for philosophy, in conversations with D. Patrick Miller. (2013)
- The Essential Marcus Aurelius (2014) with John P. Piazza
- I am Not I (2016)
