= The Tenth Straw =

1926 film

- Directed by: Robert G. McAnderson
- Cinematography: Claud C. Carter
- Production companies: Broadway Theatres Limited; Pacific Films
- Release date: 27 March 1926
- Running time: six reels
- Country: Australia
- Languages: Silent film English intertitles

The Tenth Straw is a 1926 Australian silent film heavily inspired by the novel For the Term of His Natural Life. Little is known of the director and cast, but most of the film survives today.

== Plot ==
Aristocrat Bruce Lowe is convicted for a crime he did not commit and is transported from England to Australia. An army officer, Matthew Marr, pretends to be a friend of Lowe's to gain access to his fortune and seduce his sister, Marie.

On board ship, Lowe stands up to a bully and gains a friend in Richard Groves. Lowe escapes from prison, and heads to the bush.

Some aboriginals discover a goldfield. Lowe proves his innocence, and Marr is arrested.

== Cast ==
- Peggy Paul as Marie Lowe
- Ernest Lauri as Bruce Lowe
- James Cornell as Matthew Marr
- Jack Fisher as Richard Groves
- Syd Everett as Bully Carey
- Robert Ball as Tiddley Harris
- Robert G. McAnderson as Major Orville

== Production ==
Ernest Lauri was a Brisbane actor and singer. Lauri would appear at cinemas showing the film and appear in a live prologue.

The film was mostly shot on Sydney Harbour and in the National Park. Prison scenes were shot at a Veterans' Home on Bear Island.

== Reception ==
Contemporary reviews noted the similarities of the story to For the Term of His Natural Life.

The Daily Telegraph said the film "proves definitely that Australia can produce a motion picture that can hold Its own with the best produced in other parts of the world."

The Brisbane Sunday Mail said "there is not one objectionable feature in the whole six reels. The predominating note is one of kindness and sympathy. True, it has its fighting reels, and real fights, too, while the love interest is ever present."

Everyone's said "Evidently there has been no great expense incurred in its making, and the many crudities will not pass un-noticed, but it has the saving grace of interest, and will be followed attentively from the first to the last reel."
