= The Shattered Illusion =

1928 film

- Directed by: A. G. Harbrow
- Written by: A. G. Harbrow
- Starring: J. Robertson Aiken
- Cinematography: Reg Robinson
- Production company: Victorian Film Productions
- Release date: January 1928
- Running time: 5,000 feet (45 mins)
- Country: Australia
- Languages: Silent film English intertitles

The Shattered Illusion is a 1928 Australian silent film about a rich financier who is shipwrecked. Unlike many Australian silent films, a copy of it exists today.

== Plot ==
Financier Lewis Alden has a nervous breakdown and loses his memory. He joins the crew of a ship and is marooned after a storm at sea, along with Joyce. The shock of this causes him to regain his memory. One day, he discovers a drifting lifeboat containing several newspapers and he reads, to his dismay, that his companies have thrived in his absence and he is not as important as he once thought. He finds comfort from Joyce and after the two of them are rescued, decides to live on her family's plantation in New Guinea.

== Cast ==
- J. Robertson Aiken as Lewis Alden
- Gret Wiseman as Joyce Hilton
- Don Winder as John Galway
- Mary McDermott as Alice Newton
- Jack Hooper as Dr Haynes
- A.G. Harbrow as Dr Haynes
- Alec Sutherland as tramp
- Norman Arthur as John Elsworth
- Clare Dight as Mrs Elsworth

== Production ==
The film was shot in July and August 1927, with interiors filmed in a backyard studio in Abbotsford, Melbourne.

It was the first movie from Victorian Film Productions, who later made a comedy short, The Tramp (1929), and the feature Tiger Island (1930).
