= Dennis Lewis =

American spiritual writer

Dennis Lewis (born 1940) is a non-fiction writer and teacher in the areas of breathing, qigong, meditation, and self-enquiry.

In the book The Complete Idiot's Guide to Taoism Lewis is recommended as a source of instruction in Taoism for people who don't have much time for study and practice. His breathing instruction and practices have also been recommended to augment meditation techniques, to improve singing ability, as a support for recovery from injury, for stress reduction, and for greater calm, presence, and clarity.

In a 2004 critique of New Age literature by Jeremy Carrette and Richard King, he's cited as drawing upon the traditional Taoist interest in longevity but his writing is also categorized as an example of the "flattening out" of subtle cultural and philosophical religious ideas for the commercial and modern self-help and personal development movement. In the preface and introduction to The Tao of Natural Breathing, however, Lewis states that his intention in this book wasn't just to explore "the relationship of breathing to health and inner growth" from the Taoist perspective, but also from his "observations and discoveries" from Advaita Vedanta, the Gurdjieff Work, Ilse Middendorf, Feldenkrais, and others, along with scientific principles from anatomy, neurochemistry, and physiology.

== Biography ==
Born in Milwaukee, Wisconsin, Lewis spent most of his adult life in San Francisco, California. He moved to Scottsdale, Arizona in 2006. He attended the University of Wisconsin initially but has a degree from San Francisco State University awarded in 1967 in Philosophy of Religion.

Lewis was the co-founder and president of Hi-Tech Public Relations, San Francisco, which was sold to Shandwick P.L.C (UK) in 1988.

Lewis studied Taoism and Qigong with Mantak Chia, Dr. Wang Shan Long, and Bruce Frantzis. In the Gurdjieff tradition his main teacher was Lord John Pentland, from whom he learned breath-awareness practices as part of Gurdjieff's overall teachings. Lewis also worked with Advaita Vedanta teacher Jean Klein, with whom he studied self-enquiry, yoga and pranayama.

His son is the author Benoit Denizet-Lewis.

== Teachings ==
Lewis conducts Authentic Breathing workshops and retreats at venues such as Esalen Institute and the National Qigong Association conferences with the stated goal of helping people develop natural, conscious breathing and also integrating that breathing into one's everyday life. He believes that "breathing exercises are a dime a dozen" and often applied in manipulative or even dangerous ways. In his books he describes ways to avoid that by safely opening up the breathing spaces of the body. His techniques employ a mix of mindfulness and awareness practices, movements, postures, touch, and sound, with a stated emphasis on learning how to exhale fully and effortlessly. He writes in his articles and books that when the exhalation is full and natural, the inhalation usually takes place spontaneously in the most appropriate way for the demands of the moment.

Lewis claims that most people are unaware of their breathing until they have some kind of major problem. This lack of breathing awareness, he believes, is a manifestation of a larger issue: a general lack of self-knowledge and self-awareness. Reflecting the teachings of G. I. Gurdjieff, Lewis maintains that people often live unconscious, mechanical, disharmonious lives, unaware of the miracle of their own being. Lewis leads "harmonious awakening" gatherings, on occasion with harmonic chant pioneer David Hykes. He describes those gatherings as helpful for seeing and going "beyond the boundaries of the conditioned mind--the habitual constellation of thoughts, emotions, sensations, beliefs, and judgments that each of us calls 'myself'." He also claims they can help people "awaken to who they really are". In the gatherings he employs self-enquiry, natural breathing, qigong, meditation, and special self-sensing and awareness practices.

In his writing and teaching about breathing, Lewis maintains that many people habitually hyperventilate — by which he means taking rapid shallow breaths from the top of the chest instead of breathing more naturally with the entire abdomen and back — and this reduces carbon dioxide levels in the blood too rapidly and thus causes an oxygen shortage in the brain and body. The result of lower oxygen he claims is, among other things, anxiety, tension, or irritability. There is disagreement about the benefits of increased oxygen blood levels. According to Dr. Mary Purucker, a pulmonary specialist in the U.S. Food and Drug Administration Center for Drug Evaluation and Research, there are no long-term, well-controlled scientific studies that support claims of benefit for increased oxygen in healthy people. There are many like Lewis today, however, including breath therapists, breathing teachers, MDs, and researchers, who maintain that good breathing increases the likelihood of a longer, healthier, more-rewarding life—physically, emotionally, and spiritually.

== Published works ==
- Breathe Into Being: Awakening to Who You Really Are (Quest Books, 2009)
- Free Your Breath, Free Your Life (Shambhala Publications, 2004)
- The Tao of Natural Breathing (Rodmell Press, 2006).
- Natural Breathing (audio program, Sounds True, 2005)
- Sacred Tradition & Present Need (out of print, co-editor with Jacob Needleman)
- On the Way to Self Knowledge (out of print, co-editor with Jacob Needleman)

== Other sources that reference Lewis' work ==
- Bailey, Steven (2001) The Fasting Diet ISBN 0-658-01145-6
- Carrette, Jeremy and King, Richard (2004) Capitalist Spirituality: The Silent Takeover of Religion ISBN 0-415-30208-0
- Goddard, Gabriella (2008) Gulp! The 7 Day Crash Course to Master Fear and Break Through Any Challenge ISBN 978-0-553-38498-7
- Jameson, Timothy J. (1998) Repetitive Strain Injuries ISBN 0-87983-802-7
- Lazarus, Judith (2000) Stress Relief & Relaxation Techniques ISBN 0-658-00385-2
- Mccarthy, Jenna (April 2001), "Breathing Lessons - how breathing properly aids health" - article in Los Angeles Magazine
- Irwin, Lee (2004) Daoist Alchemy in the West: The Esoteric Paradigms- article in Michigan State Universities' Esoterica Journal which lists Lewis' main teachers
- Rogers, Scott (2006) Mindful Parenting ISBN 0-9773455-0-5
- Toropov, Brandon and Hansen, Chad (2002) The Complete Idiot's Guide to Taoism ISBN 0-02-864262-7
