= Wright Gemini =

Wright Gemini, a generic name for a style of low-floor double-deck bus bodywork built by Wright may refer to:

- Wright Eclipse Gemini, on Volvo-based chassis
- Wright Gemini 2 DL, an integral double-decker with VDL chassis modules
  - Wright Gemini 2 HEV, an integral hybrid double-decker
- Wright Pulsar Gemini, on VDL DB250 chassis
