= Gemini Powered Parachutes =

American aircraft manufacturer

- Type: Privately held company
- Industry: Aerospace
- Founded: circa 2002
- Defunct: 2007
- Fate: Out of business
- Headquarters: Culver, Indiana, United States
- Products: Powered parachutes

Gemini Powered Parachutes was an American aircraft manufacturer based in Culver, Indiana. The company specialized in the design and manufacture of powered parachutes in the form of ready-to-fly aircraft under the US FAR 103 Ultralight Vehicles rules and the European Fédération Aéronautique Internationale microlight category.

The company was founded by a former employee of Buckeye Industries. It seems to have been founded about 2002 and gone out of business in 2007.

Gemini produced a series of single-seat powered parachutes, including the Gemini Classic, Gemini Star, Gemini Ultra Star and Gemini Viper. There was also one two-seat trainer model, the Gemini Twin which had sold 60 aircraft by 2005.

== Aircraft ==
Summary of aircraft built by Gemini Powered Parachutes
Model name	First flight	Number built	Type
Gemini Classic			Single-seat powered parachute
Gemini Star			Single-seat powered parachute
Gemini Ultra Star			Single-seat powered parachute
Gemini Viper			Single-seat powered parachute
Gemini Twin		60 (2005)	Two-seat powered parachute
