= Twin Sisters (Colorado) =

Mountain in Colorado

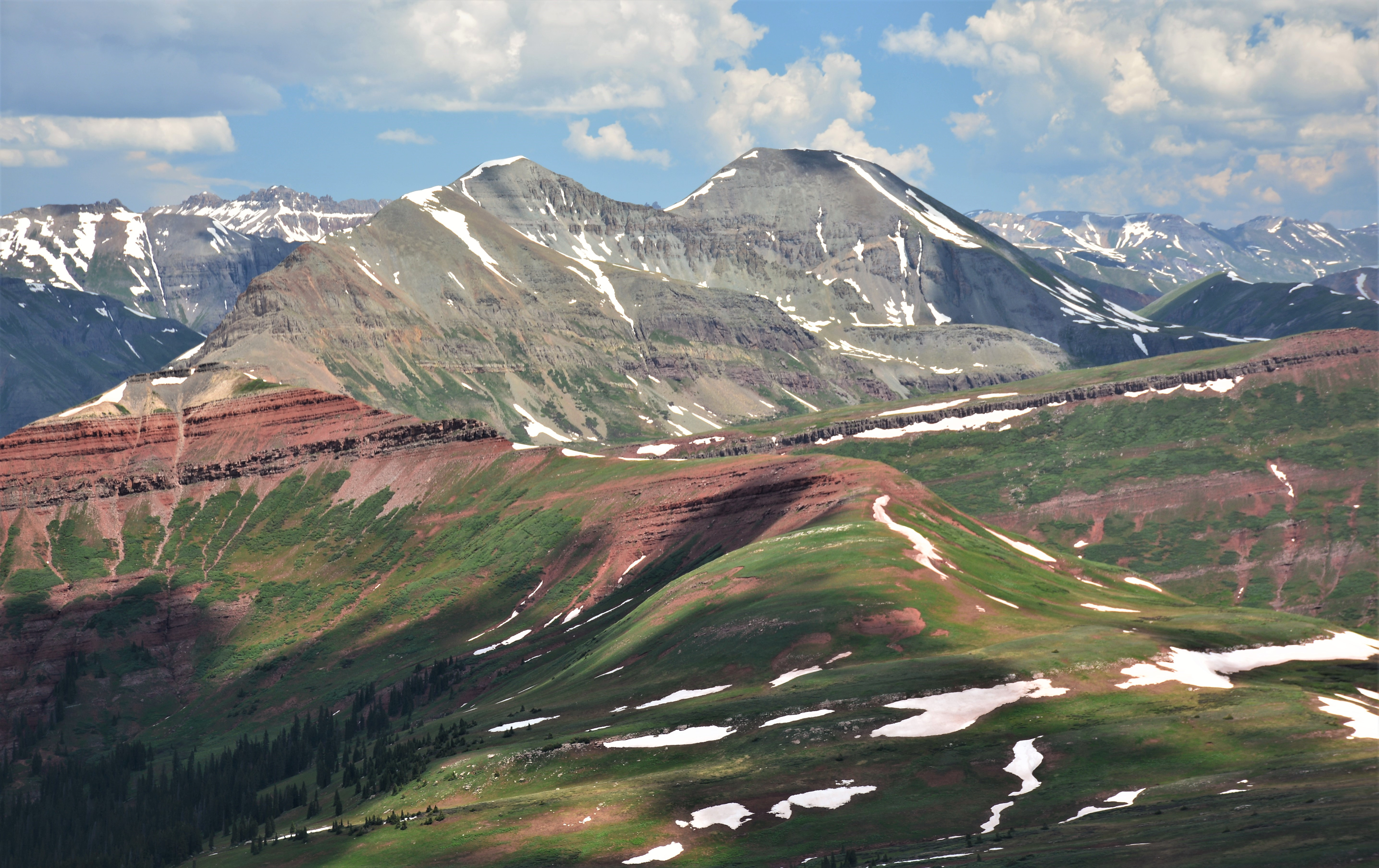
- South aspect, from Engineer Mountain

Highest point
- Elevation: 13,432 ft (4,094 m)
- Prominence: 1,112 ft (339 m)
- Parent peak: Rolling Mountain (13,693 ft)
- Isolation: 2.23 mi (3.59 km)
- Coordinates: 37°46′18″N 107°47′09″W

Geography
- Location within Colorado Location within the United States
- Location: San Juan County, Colorado, US
- Parent range: Rocky Mountains; San Juan Mountains
- Topo map: USGS Ophir

Climbing
- Easiest route: class 2

Twin Sisters is a 13,432-foot-elevation (4,094-meter) mountain summit located in San Juan County, Colorado, United States. The lower west summit has an elevation of 13,374 feet (4,076 meters) and 0.43 mile separates the pair. Twin Sisters is part of the San Juan Mountains range which is a subset of the Rocky Mountains, and is west of the Continental Divide. It is situated 7.5 miles southwest of the community of Silverton, on land managed by San Juan National Forest. It is set 5.5 miles north of Engineer Mountain, and 2.2 miles east of Rolling Mountain, the nearest higher neighbor. Other neighbors include Snowdon Peak seven miles to the southeast, and Golden Horn, 3.5 miles to the northwest. Topographic relief is significant as the north aspect rises 3,000 feet (910 meters) above South Fork Mineral Creek in approximately 1.5 mile. The mountain's name, which has been officially adopted by the United States Board on Geographic Names, was in use in 1906 when Henry Gannett published it in A Gazetteer of Colorado.

== Climate ==
According to the Köppen climate classification system, Twin Sisters is located in an alpine subarctic climate zone with long, cold, snowy winters, and cool to warm summers. Due to its altitude, it receives precipitation all year, as snow in winter, and as thunderstorms in summer, with a dry period in late spring. Precipitation runoff from the mountain drains into tributaries of the Animas River.

== See also ==
- Mountains of San Juan County, Colorado
