= YGA (magazine) =

Magazine for LGBT youth

Cover of premier issue of YGA Mag

YGA was a bimonthly magazine for LGBT youth launched in December 2004. It was established by Benjie Nycum and Michael Glatze and published in Halifax, Nova Scotia, since Nycum grew up there although was born an American. Nycum and Glatze had met while both were working for XY Magazine in San Francisco. The two would end up being partners for 10 years.

The magazine had the distinction of being the only English language publication catering for all queer and questioning youth, as opposed to the male-only youth-oriented magazine XY.

The magazine was an offshoot of Young Gay America, a non-profit organization founded by Nycum and Glatze in 2001.

The magazine became respected as a resource by high school and public libraries, youth groups, counsellors and parents. Many looked at the launch of YGA as a sign that the queer youth movement was beginning to take shape. The magazine attracted notability and received awards, including the National Role Model Award from Equality Forum, a major gay organization.

== See also ==
- XY (magazine)
