= The Twin (EP) =

The Twin EP

EP by The Twin alias Boy George
- Released: 2003–2004
- Recorded: 2002–2003
- Genres: Electronica, techno, synthpop, electropop, electroclash
- Label: More Protein
- Producer: Kinky Roland

The Twin alias Boy George chronology
U Can Never B2 Straight (2002)	'''The Twin EP''' (2003)	Yum Yum (2004)

The Twin EP is Boy George’s fourth EP, promoted in late 2003 and early 2004, under the same pseudonym of The Twin. The project includes vocalist and DJ Boy George and dance producer Kinky Roland, who helped George write and produce many of his most recent tracks, either as a solo singer for his albums, and as an independent DJ for his numerous mix compilations.

Both George and Roland explain what is The Twin. The former, on his MySpace page, defines The Twin as his "alter ago, after all I am a Gemini, and I always joke that you’re never alone with a Gemini, not even when you’re on your own". The latter, in an interview for The Devil in Sister George Homepage, when asked "if The Twin is George and Kinky Roland or is the Twin: George and his alter Ego featuring the Replicant or is The Twin George and Leigh Bowery or what?", answers instead that "The Twin is Boy George's project I'm doing writing and producing for his new alter ego".

George points to David Bowie, along with Gene Pitney, as the most important early influences for The Twin project. As regards The Twin, actually, the new character was first born, as it seems, after George played the role of the Australian performance artist and designer Leigh Bowery, in the musical Taboo, co-written by Boy George himself, who also composed both soundtrack albums for the London and Broadway shows. The singer, turned into an actor, has revealed that it was easier for him to play someone else's role instead of his own (who was also in the show among the main characters), and that he is not new to working under the guise of some pseudonym, as he already did, most notably, with the band Jesus Loves You or under the pseudonym Angela Dust as producer and composer =: not being exposed as Boy George, too famous a name to dangerously depart from the established path, allowed him much more experimentation (the same happened when leaving his former group, Culture Club, who obliged him to always stick to the same vocal style), at the same time permitting him to possibly hide under some other label, in case of commercial and critical failure (which never happened, by the way, on such a huge scale as not to come out in the open).

As concerns The Twin's extreme image (Bowery was famous for creating gravity-defying dresses, as well as outrageous make-up and exaggeratedly gorgeous looks), Boy George admits that he had been almost dressing down, following his personal standards, of course, for a few years, when he suddenly found himself thrown into Leigh's extraordinary looks and make-up, one of the most famous of which consisted in latex drips over his head, a green tutu and a specially designed corset so as to make him look as he had a prosperous real breast: it was this experience that reminded him that he was ultimately a freak, pushing him to create The Twin project, where the extreme looks are matched by a hard pumping music, mostly consisting in electronica beats, strong dance rhythms and outrageous lyrics. Though The Twin never attained commercial success, even because most of the singles and the one album, Yum Yum, released so far, didn't get airplay, and were only available for a short time and only in limited editions, his personal MySpace page and YouTube offer many possibilities to listen and watch the project in live shows, made unique by the acid house sound and the gorgeous look. The most popular track on The Twin EP is the opener called "Nothing", of which many versions and remixes exist, as well as many promotional live videos.

== Track listing ==
1. "Nothing" (O'Dowd/The Droyds)
2. "Don't Go Draggin' Me Down" (O'Dowd/AdamSky)
3. "Sorrow" (Bob Feldman, Jerry Goldstein, Richard Gottehrer)
4. "Second Chance" (O'Dowd/T-Total)

== Musicians ==
- Boy George: vocals, lyrics and turntables
- Kinky Roland: producer
