= Gemini Industries =

Defunct American consumer electronics manufacturer

Gemini Industries, Inc.
- Company type: Public
- Industry: Consumer electronics
- Founded: 1964; 62 years ago in Clifton, New Jersey
- Founder: Sandor "Sandy" Garfinkle
- Defunct: 2004; 22 years ago
- Fate: Acquired by Philips
- Successor: Philips Accessories and Computer Peripherals North America
- Headquarters: United States
- Website: gemini-usa.com at the Wayback Machine (archived December 5, 1998)

Gemini Industries, Inc., was an American consumer electronics manufacturer based in Clifton, New Jersey, and active from 1964 to 2004. The company began as a small metal fabrication firm, producing mostly consumer television antenna rotators before branching out to various other consumer electronics in the 1980s, eventually becoming a multi-million dollar player in the industry. In 1994, with the purchase of PC Accessories, Inc., of Dallas, Texas, the company began offering peripherals for personal computers. In 2004, the company was purchased by Philips and restructured as an American division of their Dutch parent company, Philips Accessories and Computer Peripherals North America.

== History ==
Gemini Industries, Inc., was primarily founded by Sandor "Sandy" Garfinkle (c. 1937 – January 26, 2004) in Clifton, New Jersey, in 1964 as small metal fabrication firm. The company's most popular commodity in its early days was consumer antenna rotators for television sets. In the first couple decades of their existence, the company also produced residential mailboxes. In 1985, the founders sold the company to Wesray Capital in a leveraged buyout, who in turn Gemini to a branch of Merrill Lynch in 1988. Garfinkle all the while stayed on board as president of the company.

Logo of the Rabbit VCR Multiplying System

In the late 1980s, the company began selling the VideoCaster, a consumer television transmitter intended to allow households to receive the output of a videocassette recorder (VCRs) from any television set in the house without having to buy additional VCRs, a somewhat costly proposition at the time. In 1990, Gemini acquired Rabbit Systems, Inc., a company founded in 1984 that was the progenitor of this type of VCR transmitter product with the release of the Rabbit VCR Multiplying System in 1986. Advantageous to Rabbit's system was the ability of its transmitter to repeat the infrared signals coming from the VCR's remote.

In December 1993, Gemini established a telecommunications unit of the company, dedicated to developing and contracting the manufacture of accessories for cellular phones under their Gemini and Axiom brands. These accessories included aftermarket antennas, carrying cases, power cords, battery packs, chargers, and savers, and phone mounts.

Logo of PC Accessories

In 1994, the company acquired PC Accessories, Inc., of Dallas, Texas, a manufacturer of peripherals for personal computers. Under ownership of Gemini, PC Accessories developed trackballs, ergonomic keyboards, headphones, floppy disks, and CD-ROM cases and containers, among others.

In 1995, Gemini became the first licensee of the Magnavox name, after both Philips and Southwestern Bell (rightsholders to the Magnavox name) agreed to sign a contract with Gemini to license the name for a line of consumer electronics in the United States.

Gemini was acquired again in 2000 by York Management Services of Somerset, New Jersey. Garfinkle was deposed as president, replaced by Michael O'Neal, who was also named CEO. Under O'Neal's leadership, Gemini acquired all of the remaining assets of Zenith Accessories, the parts and supplies arm of Zenith Electronics, in 2001, and planned to acquire the recently bankrupted Recoton around the same time before losing their bid to Thomson SARL in 2003.

Gemini reported annual sales of $200 million and employment numbers of 500 in 2003. In July 2004, Philips announced its intention to acquire Gemini Industries for an undisclosed sum, later revealed to be roughly $67 million in cash and assumption of debts.
