= The Twins (1923 film) =

1923 film

- Directed by: Leslie McCallum
- Written by: Ray Whiting
- Produced by: Leslie McCallum
- Starring: Ray Whiting
- Cinematography: Leslie McCallum
- Production companies: Blue Gum Company, for the Charity Moving Picture Company
- Release date: 28 June 1923
- Country: Australia
- Languages: Silent film English intertitles

The Twins is a 1923 Australian silent film directed by Melbourne cinematographer Leslie McCallum. It is a rural farce-melodrama and is considered a lost film.

== Plot ==
Characters from the country visit the city. Among the characters are a female vamp, who winds up committing suicide.

== Cast ==
- Ray Whiting and Jim Paxton as the twins
- Cath McMicking as heroine
- Aubrey Gibson as villain
- Doreen Gale as vamp
- Jim Doods as Horace Hothouse
- Keith McHarg
- Billy Begg
- Norman Carlyon

== Production ==
The film was made to raise funds for various charities including the Melbourne Women's Hospital. It was sponsored by Carlyon's ballroom in St Kilda; Norman Carlyon appeared in the cast and a fund raising ball was held on 19 June 1923.

== Reception ==
According to contemporary reports, response to the film was positive and money was made from its release.
