= Michael Glatze =

American former gay rights activist and pastor

- Born: Michael Elliot Glatze; 1975 (age 50–51); Tacoma, Washington, United States

Michael Elliot Glatze (/ɡlæts/; born 1975) co-founded Young Gay America and is a former advocate for gay rights. He subsequently renounced homosexuality and became a non-denominational Christian pastor.

== Biography ==
Glatze was born in Tacoma, Washington. His mother was a non-denominational Christian and his father was agnostic. His father died of a heart condition when Glatze was 13, and his mother died when he was 19. Glatze earned a bachelor's degree from Dartmouth College where he majored in English literature and creative writing, with a minor in music.

While working at XY Magazine in San Francisco, Glatze met Benjie Nycum. Glatze and Nycum coauthored the book XY Survival Guide (2000). They later co-founded their own magazine, Young Gay America.

In 2003, Glatze starred in Jim in Bold, an LGBT-related film, with his then-partner Benjie.

In 2005, Glatze was quoted by Time magazine saying "I don't think the gay movement understands the extent to which the next generation just wants to be normal kids. The people who are getting that are the Christian right."

Glatze turned toward Christianity after a health scare due to palpitations. Worried that he was affected by the same heart condition which claimed his father's life, he sought medical help. The palpitations turned out to be due to anemia, caused by celiac disease. He joined the Church of Jesus Christ of Latter-day Saints in the first half of 2007 but left the church shortly thereafter.

He has received media coverage in other publications and in the book 16 Amazing Stories of Divine Intervention as well as several blogs.

In 2011, he began studying at a Bible college in Wyoming where he met Rebekah. He married her in 2013.

=== Ministry ===
After graduating, he became pastor of a small Presbyterian church in Yoder, Wyoming. In June 2014, Glatze decided to end his affiliation with the Presbyterian Church (USA), due to the Church's decision to accept the blessing of same-sex marriages, and to become non-denominational Christian.

His story is told in the 2015 indie film, I Am Michael starring James Franco and Zachary Quinto and the short 2017 documentary Michael Lost and Found.
