= Steven Underhill =

American photographer (born 1962)

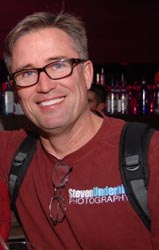
- Born: Steven Underhill; January 25, 1962 (age 64); Northern California
- Education: University of California, Los Angeles
- Occupation: Photographer
- Employer: XY Magazine
- Known for: photographing twin models and actors Bruce and Seth Hall
- Website: www.stevenunderhill.com

Steven Underhill (born January 25, 1962) is an American photographer. He grew up in Northern California and graduated from University of California, Los Angeles.

He has produced seven photo books featuring nude and semi-nude male models, titled Straight Boys, Twins, Jeff, Boys Next Door, Happy 2gether, Straight Boys Volume 2, and Rassle. He is best known for photographing identical twins Bruce and Seth Hall.

Steven Underhill was an early contributor to the gay youth publication XY Magazine.

== Published works ==
- Straight Boys (1997, 2004; English and German); ISBN 9783861873891
- Twins (1999; also known as Frisky Memories);
- Jeff (1999); ISBN 9783861871477
- Boy Next Door (2000); ISBN 9783861871668
- Happy 2gether (2003); ISBN 9783861872849
- Straight boys Volume 2 (2004; English and German); ISBN 9783861873891
- Rassle (2006; English and German); ISBN 9783861878735
