= Norwegian SciTech News =

Norwegian science publication

Norwegian SciTech News is a research website where the Norwegian University of Science and Technology and SINTEF in Trondheim, Norway, jointly share their research and innovation news with the public. The research news is published in English on a continuous basis. The same information is published in Norwegian on the gemini.no website.

Gemini was first published as a newspaper from 1987 to 1993. From 1993 onwards it was published as a magazine both in Norwegian and English, with the Norwegian version published 4 times a year and the English version published twice a year as a "best of" selection from the Norwegian edition.

The Norwegian website was launched in 2013 while the English equivalent was launched in March 2014. During the transition from paper to digital news, a paper edition of Gemini was published twice a year in both English and Norwegian in 2013 and 2014, featuring the best articles from the website, but has since been discontinued.

In June 2019 the English version of the website changed its name to Norwegian SciTech News.

The gemini.no website includes all articles from the printed magazine from 2003 onwards.

Gemini has twice been nominated for the European Excellence Awards (2010 and 2012), and won several prizes in a yearly competition hosted by the Norwegian Communication Association (Kommunikasjonsforeningen), in the category "best corporate magazine".
