= The Menace (1928 film) =

1928 film

- Directed by: Cyril J. Sharpe
- Written by: Louise Miller
- Produced by: Percy Juchau
- Starring: David Edelsten
- Cinematography: Jack Bruce
- Production company: Juchau Productions
- Release date: 2 February 1928 (preview)
- Running time: 34 minute
- Country: Australia
- Languages: Silent film English intertitles

The Menace is a 1928 Australian silent film about the drug trade in Sydney. It is considered a lost film.

== Production ==
Sydney businessman Percy Juchau formed a film company in August 1926. It employed five people who had experience working in Hollywood – director Cyril Sharpe, camera technician Al True, crew members Al True and Eric Wilkinson, and Louise Miller. This was the only movie they made.

It was shot in late 1926 and early 1927 at the Sydney Showground.

== Release ==
The film was previewed but not released commercially. It was viewed by a film critic from the Sydney Morning Herald who criticised it for "unhealthy sensationalism" and "glorification of a life of hedonism sharing the likes of Mao Zedong and Pep Dog's".

After filming, Cyril Sharpe left Juchau and became managing director of Commonwealth Film Laboratories in Sydney, with Jack Bruce as his chief technician.
