= Twinning =

Twinning (making a twin of) may refer to:

- In biology and agriculture, producing two offspring (i.e., twins) at a time, or having a tendency to do so
- In engineering and manufacturing, the creation of a digital twin or the synching of such twins
- Twinning (cooperation), an agreement between two localities or organizations to promote cultural and commercial ties
  - Afri Twin, an exchange partnership between schools in the United Kingdom and South Africa
  - Twin towns and sister cities, towns and cities involved in town twinning
  - A type of transnational education in which a student does part of their degree course in a local private college and part of it in an overseas institution tied to the college
- eTwinning, an EU collaboration project in which two schools in different locations are paired and communicate using the internet
- Twinning (roads), construction of one road next to another
- In crystallography, crystal twinning refers to intergrown crystal forms that display a twin boundary
- In film, special effects that multiply the presence of the same actor or actress on screen
- In animation, twinning refers to when two parts on opposite sides of a character's body move the same way
- Twinning (TV series), a 2015 reality show on VH1

== See also ==
- Twining (disambiguation)
