= Astatic Corporation =

American microphone company

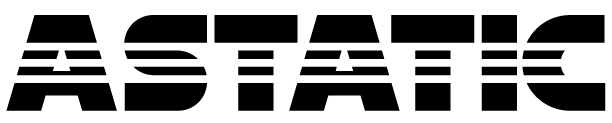
- Type: Private
- Founded: 1931; 95 years ago
- Founders: Creed M. Chorpening, F.H. Woodworth
- Headquarters: Solon, Ohio, United States
- Products: Pro audio, microphones, sound equipment
- Owner: DAS Companies, Jam Industries
- Website: www.cadaudio.com

The Astatic Corporation is a commercial audio products manufacturer founded in Youngstown, Ohio, in 1931.

== History ==
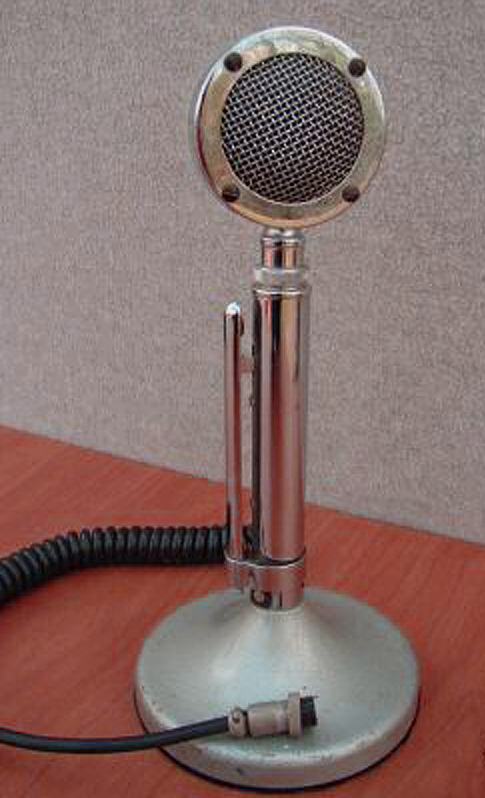
Astatic model D-104 microphone

In 1930, two amateur radio operators, Creed M. Chorpening, W8WR (later W8MJM) and F.H. Woodworth, W8AHW began experimenting with different types of microphones for their "ham" stations. Their mutual friend, Charles Semple, worked for Brush Development Company where he had been experimenting with Rochelle salt crystals. Semple demonstrated some crystal pick-ups that Brush was working with, leading Chorpening and Woodworth to found The Astatic Microphone Laboratory, Inc. in Youngstown, Ohio in 1933. Semple was brought into the company as general manager to manufacture and market the company's model D-104 Crystal Microphone as well as other crystal microphones, crystal phonograph pickups and recording heads. In early 1944, Astatic moved operations to Conneaut, Ohio and supplied microphones, pickups and crystal cartridges as well as hydrophone and sonar devices to the military during World War II. After World War II, Astatic Microphone Laboratory became The Astatic Corporation.

Astatic formed CAD Professional Microphones in 1988 as a division of Astatic. The company reorganized as Omnitronics LLC in 2000, and later combined CAD, Astatic and Omnitronics under the CAD Audio brand. The company offers audio products for recording, live performance, commercial and personal audio, and is located in Solon, Ohio.

In 2012, the Citizens Band (CB) product division of Astatic that had been acquired from Omnitronics by Barjan LLC in 2006 was sold to DAS Companies, a communications product distributor for interstate truck stops. DAS expanded the Astatic name to non-microphone accessories including coaxial cables, meters and antennas.

== JT-30 microphone ==
Astatic also manufactured bullet style microphones, which are extremely popular among harmonica players. The original Astatic model JT-30 was introduced in late 1939. There were many variations in different colors such as the JT-30-C, W-30, 31, JT-31, JT-40, JT-50, and Model A. It is one of the most popular microphones for blues harp players. Production of the mic continued in different versions such as the JT-30VC and the CAD HM-50 that were marketed to harmonica players before being discontinued in 1999. In 1999 Hohner bought the molds to the JT-30 shell and Astatic's very last batch of crystal elements and it was sold as the Hohner 1490 Blues Blaster. The Blues Blaster elements were Astatic MC-151 Crystal elements until 2001. Later versions of the Blues Blaster used a Japanese element. The Astatic JT-30 Roadhouse was the same as the Blues blaster except with a different connector. Both microphones were discontinued in 2013 marking an end of production for the JT-30 after 74 years. The JT-30 is still popular among harmonica players. It was lightweight, cupped in the hands easily and distorted the sound when run through a Tube Amplifier. The JT-30 was used by, Little Walter, James Cotton Big Walter Horton, Junior Wells, Carey Bell, George "Harmonica" Smith, William Clarke, Gary Primich, Dennis Gruenling Kim Wilson and countless others. Many players modify them by putting in Shure Controlled Magnetic Transducers after the original elements fail.

== D-104 microphone ==
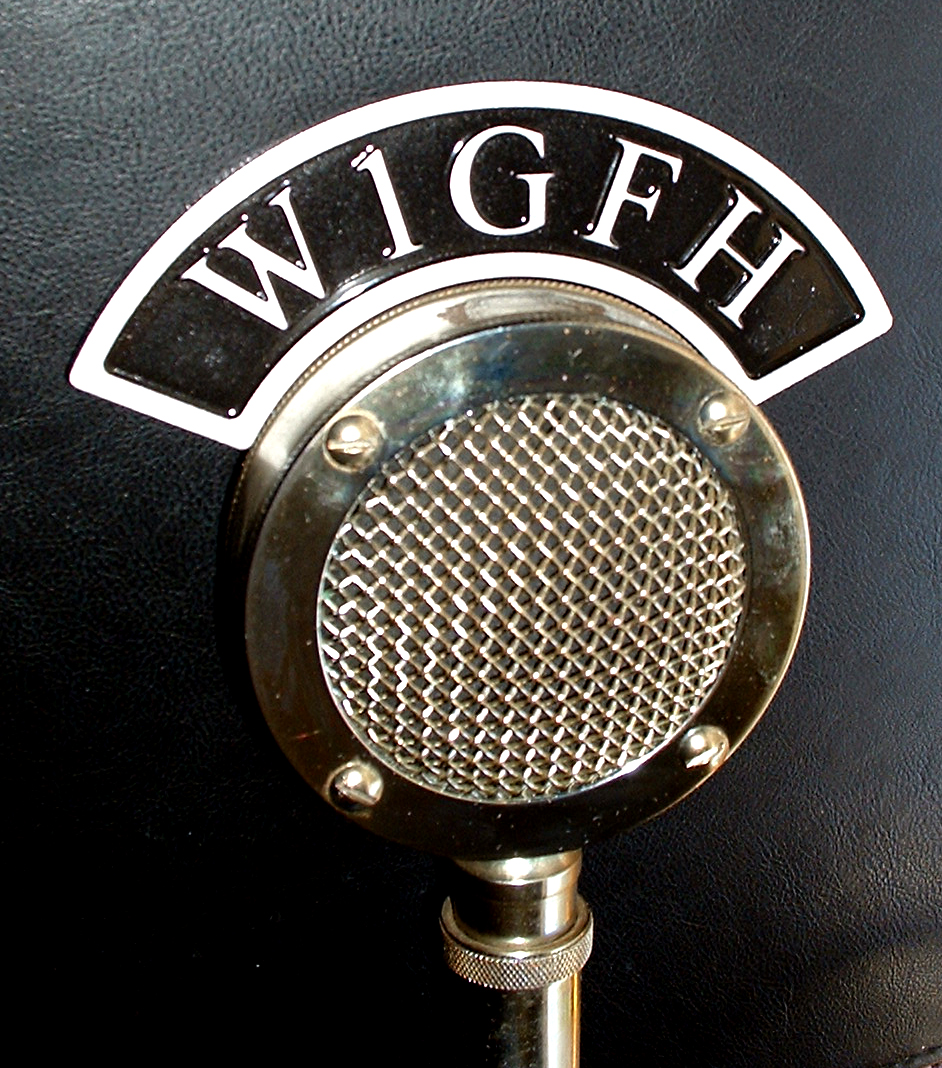
Vintage D-104 microphone head

Introduced in 1933, the Astatic model D-104 became known for its high frequency response that contributed to better communications audio quality. Early D-104 mikes used a 1" thick case, a large ID tag, and holes for "ring & spring" mounts. The design was modified in April 1937 with smaller tags and reduced thickness. A black "grip" switch stand ("G" Stand) with a metal ID tag was manufactured in January 1938. A solid-state amplifier was incorporated into the "G" stand in the 1960s. A US Bicentennial model D-104 was manufactured in 1976 featuring a 18k gold plated finish, and an eagle and shield design on the back plate. Also released at that time, was a slightly different chrome version that featured a press to talk bar on the base in addition to the standard "grip" to talk. They were known as the Golden Eagle and the Silver Eagle (respectively). Of the two, only the Silver Eagle remained in constant production since its inception, and remained one of Astatic's most popular D-104 microphones. There were other variations as well, but production ceased in 2001. The D-104 is often used by CB radio hobbyists and vintage amateur radio enthusiasts as part of their operating activities.

== See also ==
- Vintage amateur radio
