= XY (magazine) =

American gay men's magazine

XY Magazine
- Sample cover of XY
- Type: Gay magazine
- Format: Glossy Magazine
- Owner: XY Magazine
- Founded: 1996
- Political alignment: Left
- Headquarters: West Hollywood, CA
- Circulation: 44,000
- Website: www.xymag.org

XY is a gay men's magazine which has been published in the United States since 1996. XY started as a gay male youth-oriented magazine and social network. Its name is a reference to the XY chromosome pair found in males.

XY published issue 50 in October 2016 (with its original staff) after an eight-year hiatus since 2008, during which most of its staff published as B Magazine.

== Background ==
XY was founded by Peter Ian Cummings in San Francisco in 1996, and moved its operations to San Diego, California in 2001, and West Hollywood, California in 2004. It published roughly four editions a year until 2008; the Fall 2016 is Issue 50, the Wonderland Issue. The magazine contains political and cultural articles, pictures, and submissions by readers. Featured photographers included Steven Underhill (cover of issue 1, 1996), Bradford Noble, James Dawson, and many others. Featured comic series included Tough Love by Abby Denson (who still appears in Issue 50) and Joe Boy by Joe Phillips. Issue 50, “Wonderland,” which looks at the future of the U.S., includes well-known writers Douglas Rushkoff, Scott Santens writing about Basic Income, David Leddick, and Mark Simpson.

XY is a magazine for the teen to mid twenty year old gay male. Published from 1996 to 2007, this groundbreaking publication saw majority of this generation's gay youth through the hardest times of their lives.

— Amazon.Com, product description

XY is a glossy, color magazine, published bi-monthly, and known best for its original photography, brazenly honest commentary on politics and culture, review of film, music and literature, reader contributions, advice on surviving young and gay, and a rather dark sense of humor.

— XY magazine, self description

From its inception in 1996 through 2007, 49 issues were published. In issue 49 of XY (the winter 2008 issue), founding editor Peter Ian Cummings announced that he would be leaving the magazine for personal reasons; that he and his investors were looking for a new team to take it over.

When an exhaustive search produced no suitable buyers, the magazine remained in limbo until 2010, when Cummings filed for bankruptcy. During the bankruptcy proceedings, Cummings, seeking to protect users' privacy, complained to the Privacy Division of the Federal Trade Commission (FTC), a Federal Regulatory Agency, who warned the investors; the xy.com profile data and XY mailing addresses were ordered destroyed to protect users' privacy (more below).

XY's investors then sold the valuable XY.Com domain name to a Chinese game developer. After six more years of limbo, Cummings and the original team relaunched XY in 2016 after reforming XY as XY Magazine Foundation, a public-interest L3C Foundation.

== Special editions and other publications ==
As well as its regular issues, the magazine has published a series of specials:

- Two editions of the "Survival Guide" have been produced. They were more serious than usual editions with articles on everything from coming out to age of consent laws to suicide. The cover was illustrated by Abby Denson.
- "The Best of XY" contained the best of the magazine's articles, as selected by editors, contributors, and readers.
- "XY: The Photos" contained the best photos from the magazine.
- "XY: The Photos 1996+2007" contained additional photos

=== XYFoto ===
A bimonthly companion magazine XYFoto was launched in 2003 containing only photographs. This magazine was printed on matte paper and contains erotic but non-pornographic images of young men. Most issues are centered on a different city or state. Eight issues have been published, each by a different photographer, including Jevpic ("Palm Springs," 2016, which was announced in XY #50), Sean Bentz, Adam Raphael, Steven Underhill, Christopher Makos, James Patrick Dawson and Peter Ian Cummings.

=== Website ===
XY operated the website xy.com, which featured magazine content as well as an online dating service "for young gay men." The publisher notes that XY.Com was the world's largest social network for young gay men "before Facebook and Grindr, with an estimated 500,000 members." XY's new website is at xymag.org.

== Reader demographic ==
When XY launched in 1996, according to the publisher, the average age of its readers was 22. By 2001 this had lowered to 18, a demographic shift largely attributable to an increase in under-18 readers, "because people were coming out at younger ages." The publisher states that the new XY is aimed at "all ages and planets."

== Controversy ==
As a publication for young gay and bisexual men, XY has sometimes had a difficult time attracting advertisers, and often ran editorials on the topic.

Another controversy involved XY's longtime Managing Editor, Michael Glatze, who left the magazine in 2001, co-edited the "XY Survival Guide" in 2003, and in 2007 announced that he no longer identified as a homosexual, and denounced homosexuality. He is now a conservative Christian who opposes gay rights.

In July 2010, the Bureau of Consumer Protection of the Federal Trade Commission denied a request by XY's investors to obtain the customer database for the old XY magazine and profile files on the xy.com web site, which list about 100,000 and 1 million subscribers, respectively. Conforming with Cummings's and his staff's privacy policy of the magazine and site, which stated that they would "never sell its list to anybody", was found to take precedence over the desire of these investors to obtain the data for unspecified use. Many of those customers would still be underage and would not be out to their families yet, thus making their privacy of particular concern. As a result of this FTC warning, the names, addresses, and online profiles were ordered destroyed.

== See also ==
- YGA
- XY: Men, Sex, Politics: a profeminist men's magazine, Australia, 1990-1997
