= Malcolm Lazin =

American lawyer

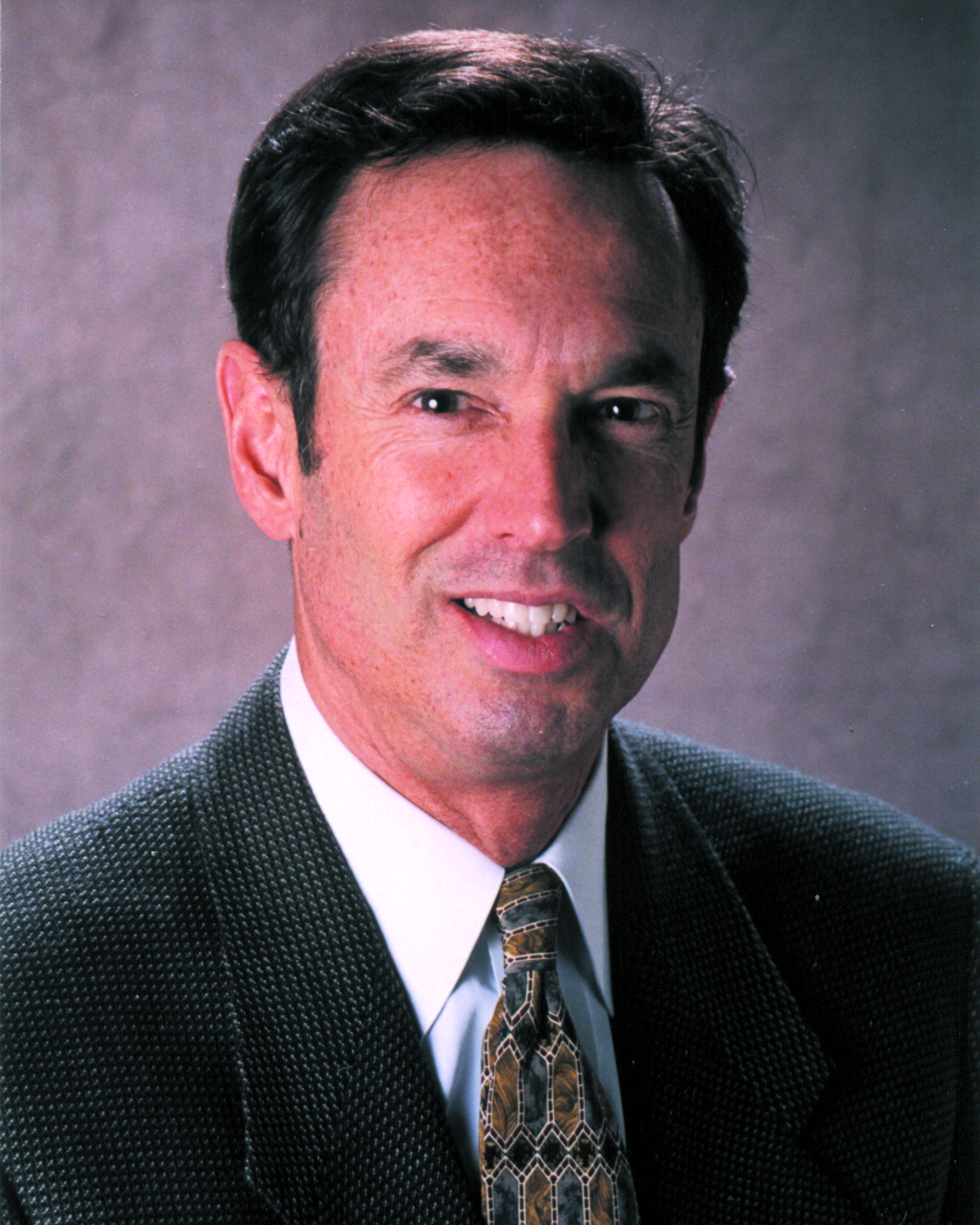
Malcolm Lazin

Malcolm L. Lazin (born December 5, 1943) is an American social activist, prosecutor, entrepreneur, and educator.

Lazin is the founder and executive director of Equality Forum, a national and international LGBTQ+ civil rights organization with an educational focus. In this role, he produced the largest annual national and international LGBTQ+ civil rights forum, facilitated the installation of 13 government-approved historic markers, and organized the 40th and 50th anniversary celebrations of the start of the LGBTQ+ civil rights movement in front of Independence Hall. Additionally, Lazin established and supervises LGBT History Month, the largest online educational resource of its kind in the world.

Previously, Lazin served as a federal prosecutor overseeing grand jury investigations into white-collar crime and public corruption. He chaired the Pennsylvania Crime Commission, which investigated organized crime. He is credited with lighting the Benjamin Franklin Bridge in celebration of the 200th anniversary of the U.S. Constitution. Lazin also successfully spearheaded the effort to include Washington Square, the largest burial site for Washington's army, located in Philadelphia, in Independence National Historical Park.

Among other honors, Lazin has received the U.S. Attorney General's Distinguished Service Award (the Department of Justice's highest honor) and the highest civil rights awards from both the National Education Association (NEA) and the American Psychiatric Association (APA).

Lazin resides in Sarasota, Florida, and Santa Fe, New Mexico.

== Early life and education ==
The oldest of five children, Lazin was raised in Lebanon, Pennsylvania. His father was an osteopathic physician and his mother a homemaker.

Lazin attended Lebanon High School. In his junior year, he won the Lebanon County Optimist Oratorical Contest. In his senior year, against the advice of his teacher, he selected the topic "The Plight of the American Negro" for the school's contest, which began his lifetime of activism. He was also president of the Lebanon AZA, a Jewish youth organization, and became president of the AZA's Southeast Pennsylvania and Delaware region.

In 1961, Lazin enrolled in Lebanon Valley College, his father's alma mater. He was president of his college class (freshman, junior, and senior years) and became president of the faculty student council in his senior year. In 1963, he participated in the March on Washington for Jobs and Freedom—the civil rights demonstration at which Martin Luther King Jr. delivered his famous "I Have a Dream" speech. In 1964, Lazin stood among the crowd in the nation's capital to witness President John F. Kennedy's funeral cortege.

At Lebanon Valley College, Lazin majored in biology and minored in chemistry. He attended Boston University School of Law, where he graduated with a J.D. in 1968.

Lazin was married for 10 years to Terry Weinstein.

== Career ==
=== Federal Prosecutor ===
After fulfilling active training in the U.S. Army reserves, Lazin began his career in 1969 at the U.S. Department of Housing and Urban Development (HUD) in the Philadelphia regional office. He went on to become an Assistant United States Attorney for the Eastern District of Pennsylvania from 1970 to 1974.

In the early 1970s, The Philadelphia Inquirer ran front-page stories on alleged abuses in the Federal Housing Administration's (FHA) low-income mortgage insurance programs. U.S. Attorney Louis Bechtle asked Lazin to examine the allegations. Lazin enlisted the help of neighborhood activists who accompanied FBI agents on interviews. After a preliminary investigation suggested a pattern of abuse, Lazin involved the IRS as well as the U.S. Department of Housing and Urban Development Office of Inspector General. The probe resulted in the convictions of 18 real estate brokers; the largest FHA mortgage company in Pennsylvania; and the Director, the deputy director and the Chief of the Property Management Section of the Philadelphia FHA Insuring Office. At the request of the U.S. Department of Justice, he taught his white-collar-crime investigative techniques to nine U.S. Attorney's offices.

Lazin also led a successful investigation into fraudulent relocation payments made by the Philadelphia Redevelopment Authority. He brought the first successful civil litigation in the nation under the Federal Water Pollution Control Act and the first criminal environmental prosecutions in the Eastern District of Pennsylvania.

In 1972 in the Great Hall of Justice, Lazin received the U.S. Attorney General's Distinguished Service Award, the department's highest honor.

=== Private Practice and Philadelphia Politics ===
In 1973, Lazin left the U.S. Attorney's Office to enter private practice as a litigation associate. Two years later, he accepted a partnership at Fell Spaulding Goff & Rubin, a Philadelphia law firm.

In early 1977, the Philadelphia Republican City Committee approached Lazin to run for district attorney against incumbent Emmett Fitzpatrick. In May, Fitzpatrick faced an upset in the Democratic primary by Edward G. Rendell, Philadelphia's former Homicide Division Chief. In the general election, Lazin received the Philadelphia Inquirer's endorsement. Democrats outnumbered Republicans by roughly 4 to 1; Lazin lost the race by roughly 3 to 2.

=== State Politics and the PA Crime Commission ===
In 1978, Pennsylvania governor Dick Thornburgh named Lazin a leader of his gubernatorial campaign. Lazin "played a key role in the campaign." In prior gubernatorial elections, Republicans lost the city by approximately 300,000 votes. Thornburgh lost Philadelphia by only about 70,000 and garnered enough votes statewide to win the election.

Under the Thornburgh administration, Lazin served as the volunteer Pennsylvania co-chair for the International Year of the Child. With the first lady of state, Ginny Thornburgh, Lazin successfully lobbied to make Pennsylvania the first state to mandate child automobile safety seats.

In 1979, Governor Thornburgh appointed Lazin to the five-member Pennsylvania Crime Commission—the principal state agency investigating organized crime with a staff of 60. On April 20, 1982, Lazin was named chairman of the commission. He helped champion the Mid-Atlantic Great Lakes Organized Crime Network (MAGLOCN)—the first computerized organized crime law-enforcement database, which resulted from the work of the commission, and which aggregated and shared information inter- and intrastate. During his tenure as chair, the New York and Philadelphia organized crime families were warring over Atlantic City, where gambling had been recently approved. Mob murders were rampant. Lazin became a media point person, commenting regularly on regional and national news programs. Lazin resigned from the commission April 27, 1983.

Lazin also ran for City Council in 2011, losing by 250 votes.

=== Commentaries ===
Lazin's political commentaries following the 2016 U.S. presidential election have been published in the Chicago Tribune, Philadelphia Inquirer, and Washington Blade and following the U.S. Capitol insurrection on January 6, 2021, by Smerconish. On February 15, 2023, acting as a former federal prosecutor, Lazin asked the office of Congressional Ethics to investigate U.S. Representative George Santos for immigration fraud. Lazin's request and accompanying letter were covered the same day by The New York Times.

== Philadelphia Leadership ==
=== American Bicentennial Rodeo ===
In 1974, Lazin conceived the idea to hold a rodeo as part of Philadelphia's U.S. Bicentennial Celebration. A neophyte to both rodeos and public event organizing, he visited major rodeos across the country and acquainted himself with Howard Harris III, one of the most highly regarded stock contractors. Through Harris, Lazin secured endorsement from the Professional Rodeo Cowboy Association to hold a sanctioned American Bicentennial Rodeo in Philadelphia. The rodeo took place at JFK Stadium in late June through early July 1976. It included six competitions over five days with Congressman Clem McSpadden, the voice of American rodeos, announcing. Five of the six 1975 world champions and top competitors in the women's barrel racing participated. Each rodeo also featured Buffalo Bill Cody's grandson riding an Appaloosa horse, an antique stagecoach that traveled between Cheyenne and Deadwood City, Wyoming, a performance by the Kiowa Tribe of Oklahoma, and a race between the Philadelphia mounted police unit and the Cheyenne Sheriff's Posse.

=== Philadelphia Waterfront Development ===
At a time when Baltimore's Inner Harbor was a thriving tourist destination, Philadelphia's waterfront remained largely undeveloped.

In 1983, Lazin became president of Penn's Landing Development Corporation. Under his leadership, the corporation won the rights from Philadelphia to develop five piers in the central waterfront district. It rehabilitated a 180,000-square-foot pier for entertainment use, built a 90,000-square-foot parking deck where charred pilings once stood and constructed a 15,000-square-foot outdoor entertainment deck. The corporation also rehabilitated another 70,000-square-foot pier for servicing boats and developed Philadelphia's first full-service marina with 300 slips.

Other companies initiated projects in the area; however, the district lacked sufficient infrastructure to accommodate and enhance the development. Lazin founded and was elected chair of the Philadelphia Waterfront Developers Council (1986–1989), which created a plan to redesign and rebuild the then dilapidated Delaware Avenue into a waterfront boulevard and successfully lobbied for access ramps to and from Interstate 95.

=== Benjamin Franklin Bridge Lighting ===
In 1985 when few buildings in Philadelphia were lit at night, Lazin conceived the notion to light the Benjamin Franklin Bridge. He presented the idea to the mayors of Philadelphia and Camden, New Jersey, and helped organize a bi-state development committee to undertake the project. The goal was to light the bridge named for a founding father, which connects two of the colonies, in time for the bicentennial of the Constitution. Lazin and City Representative Diane Semingson successfully co-chaired the project's finance and public relations sub-committee, The Benjamin Franklin Bridge was lit on September 17, 1987, for the bicentennial celebration. The lit bridge has become an iconic Philadelphia landmark.

=== Washington Square ===
In 1989, with support from U.S. Senators John Heinz III and Arlen Specter, Lazin organized and chaired the Washington Square Committee. Its purpose was to secure inclusion of Washington Square into Independence National Historical Park (INHP) and to have an honorary military guard posted at the Tomb of the Unknown Revolutionary War Soldier. Situated across from Independence Hall, the area is the largest Revolutionary War burial ground.

Lazin successfully led a nearly two-decades-long campaign for the historical site. In 1992, Secretary of the Interior Manuel Lujon signed a Memorandum of Understanding whereby the Department of the Interior committed to incorporate Washington Square into INHP, if the site could be brought up to National Park Service standards.

After a 13-year undertaking to fund improvements and meet requirements, Washington Square was made part of Independence National Historical Park, which thereafter has overseen management and guided tours. In 2005, Lazin chaired the transfer ceremony from the City of Philadelphia to Independence National Historical Park. U.S. Senator Specter and representatives from Philadelphia, the U.S. Department of Defense and the U.S. Department of the Interior participated in the event.

As part of the 250th anniversary of the United States, Lazin served as National Chair of the Haym Salomon Remembrance, a formal ceremony held at Washington Square on October 19, 2026. The Remembrance commemorated the anniversary of the Battle of Yorktown and the British surrender, and celebrated the contributions of Haym Salomon, a Philadelphia financier who made the battle possible.

Lazin continues to chair the Washington Square Committee (as of 2002), with the goal of having an honorary military guard posted at the Tomb of the Unknown Revolutionary War Soldier.

=== Other Public Service ===
Lazin served for approximately 10 years as the Chair of the Local Legislative Committee of the Greater Philadelphia Chamber of Commerce. He has also served as President of the Society Hill Civic Association, Vice President of the Society Hill Synagogue, Vice President of the Golden Slipper Club, board president of the Academy House Office Complex Association, board president of the Gulf & Bay Club Condominium Association in Sarasota, Florida, and on the boards of various nonprofit organizations.

== Equality Forum and LGBT Civil Rights ==
Lazin is the founder and executive director of Equality Forum, a nonprofit 501(c)3 organization that coordinates LGBT History Month, produces documentary films, undertakes high-impact initiatives and annually presents an international LGBT civil rights summit.

=== History and Annual Summit ===
In 1993, Lazin founded PrideFest Philadelphia and served as its board co-chair. In the early 1990s, gay pride parades abounded. PrideFest focused instead on gay and lesbian organizations and on civil rights issues and aspirations.

The first PrideFest involved 15 regional organizations presenting panel discussions over a weekend. By 1996, what was now PrideFest America had become a week-long event, including 60 regional, state and national organizations. In 1999, PrideFest named Lazin its first executive director. In 2003, the organization changed its name to Equality Forum, and its annual event included international organizations.

At its peak, the annual Equality Forum was the largest national and international LGBT summit, featuring panel discussions, art exhibits, parties, programs and special events. Beginning in 2004, it included a Featured Nation.

The annual Equality Forum employed groundbreaking strategy: It framed gay issues as civil rights, it championed bisexual and transgender inclusion, it created the longest-standing role model award, it presented the first annual LGBT art exhibit, it embraced religious programming, and it encompassed international LGBT civil rights by annually exploring the conditions of a featured country or region, including Germany, Russia, Canada, China, Israel, and the Muslim world.

=== LGBT History Month ===
In 2006, at Lazin's initiative, Equality Forum assumed responsibility for LGBT History Month. Celebrated in October, LGBT History Month honors 31 Icons, one each day, with a video, bio, bibliography and other online resources. The website archives the Icons, which are searchable from a tag cloud of approximately 150 descriptors.

=== Film Credits ===
Co-Executive Producer, Gay Pioneers

==== Gay Pioneers ====
Gay Pioneers was conceived by Lazin, who wanted to document the start of the organized LGBT civil rights movement. The movement began with protests in New York and Washington D.C. which led to milestone demonstrations in Philadelphia known as Annual Reminders, held each Fourth of July from 1965 to 1969 in front of Independence Hall. Lazin approached Philadelphia PBS affiliate WHYY, which agreed to co-produce the film. Directed by award-winning documentarian Glenn Holsten, Gay Pioneers includes on-camera interviews with the movement's seminal leaders and participants, most notably Frank Kameny and Barbara Gittings. It premiered on PBS and has been screened widely at film festivals; by high school and college GSAs; at the CIA in Langley, Virginia; and at annual meetings of national organizations, including the American Historical Association.

==== Jim in Bold ====
Executive Producer, Jim in Bold

Jim in Bold was the first feature-length documentary produced about the impact of bullying on LGBTQ youth. It has been screened at the annual meetings of the American Academy of Child and Adolescent Psychiatry and the American Psychiatric Association, and in other venues on four continents. For his work on the film, Lazin received the National Education Association's Virginia Uribe Award for Creative Leadership in Human Rights, the NEA's highest annual civil rights honor.

==== Saint of 9-11 ====
Executive Producer, Saint of 9-11

Saint of 9-11 film poster

Saint of 9/11 is a feature-length documentary about Father Mychal Judge, Chaplain of the New York City Fire Department and the first official victim of 9/11. Narrated by Ian McKellen, the film premiered at the 2006 Tribeca Film Festival and was an official selection of the Montreal World Film Festival. It received a favorable review by The New York Times.

==== I Am Michael ====
Co-Executive Producer, I Am Michael

I Am Michael, written and directed by Justin Kelly, is a 2015 drama based on The New York Times Magazine article, "My Ex-Gay Friend," by Benoit Denizet-Lewis, and the film JIM IN BOLD. The movie stars James Franco, Zachary Quinto, Emma Roberts and Charlie Carver.

=== Theater Credits ===
Lazin is Executive Producer of 217 Boxes of Dr. Henry Anonymous, an Off-Broadway play.

=== Special Projects ===
As the executive director of Equality Forum, Lazin led numerous initiatives.

The FORTUNE 500 project lobbied the nation's largest companies to provide anti-discrimination protection for sexual orientation. The project launched in 2004 when just under 64% of the FORTUNE 500 offered their employees this assurance; today the number is nearly 94%.

Project 1138 increased public awareness of the 1,138 federal marital benefits and protections denied to same-sex couples as the result of marriage inequality.

Lazin chaired the National LGBT 50th Anniversary Celebration, July 2–5, 2015, in Philadelphia.

=== Philanthropy ===
In 2018, Lazin established the Lazin Scholarship, awarded annually to a high-achieving, financially needy graduate of Lebanon High School, Lazin's high school alma mater. The Lazin Scholarship provides tuition for an associate degree at Harrisburg Area Community College, Lebanon Campus. If the student matriculates to Lebanon Valley College, Lazin's college alma mater, the scholar receives tuition assistance for a baccalaureate degree.

== Awards and recognition ==
1972: Distinguished Service Award, Office of the U.S. Attorney General, Department of Justice

1972: Honorary Special Agent Award, IRS Intelligence Division

1984: Guest, White House State Dinner, Hosted by President and Mrs. Ronald Reagan for President Jaime Lusinchi of Venezuela

2005: Virginia Uribe Award for Creative Leadership in Human Rights, National Education Association

2006: Distinguished Alumnus Award, Lebanon Valley College

2007: Prime Mover, Hunt Alternatives Fund

2016: Lifetime Hero Award, Delaware Valley Legacy Fund

2020: Special Presidential Commendation, American Psychiatric Association

2021: John Fryer Award, American Psychiatric Association
