= Escapism =

Mental diversion from unpleasant or boring aspects of life

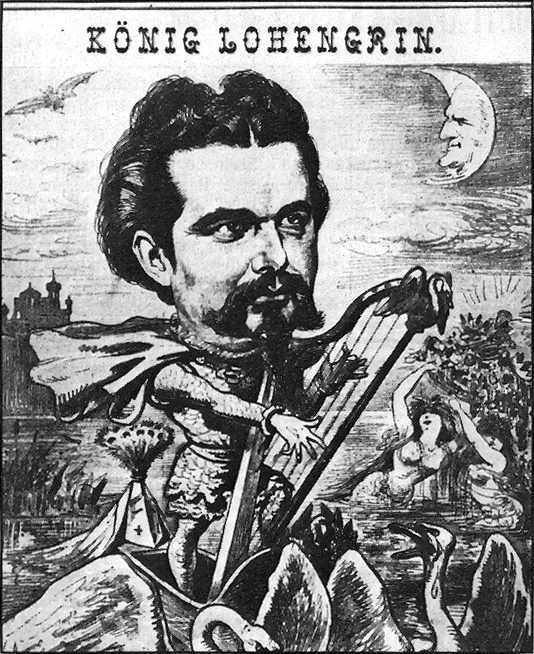
King Ludwig II of Bavaria was famous for his escapism, which involved his admiration for the work of Richard Wagner. In this caricature, he is portrayed in the role of King Lohengrin.

Escapism is mental diversion from unpleasant aspects of daily life, typically through activities involving imagination or entertainment. Escapism also may be used to occupy one's self away from persistent feelings of depression or general sadness.

== Perceptions ==
Entire industries have sprung up to foster a growing tendency of people to remove themselves from the rigors of daily life – especially into the digital world. Many activities that are normal parts of a healthy existence (e.g., eating, sleeping, exercise, sexual activity) can also become avenues of escapism when taken to extremes or out of proper context; as a result the word "escapism" often carries a negative connotation, suggesting that escapists are unhappy, with an inability or unwillingness to connect meaningfully with the world and to take necessary action. The Oxford English Dictionary defined escapism as "The tendency to seek, or the practice of seeking, distraction from what normally has to be endured". Such forms of escapism can also be observed in media consumption practices such as comfort television, where individuals return to familiar content for relaxation and emotional regulation.

However, many challenge the idea that escapism is fundamentally and exclusively negative. C. S. Lewis was fond of humorously remarking that the usual enemies of escape were jailers and considered that, used in moderation, escapism could serve both to refresh and to expand the imaginative powers. Similarly, J. R. R. Tolkien argued for escapism in fantasy literature as the creative expression of reality within a secondary (imaginative) world (but also emphasised that they required an element of horror in them, if they were not to be 'mere escapism'). Terry Pratchett considered that the twentieth century had seen the development over time of a more positive view of escapist literature. Apart from literature, music and video games have been seen and valued as artistic media of escape, too.

== Psychological escapes ==
Sigmund Freud considered a quota of escapist fantasy a necessary element in the life of humans: "[T]hey cannot subsist on the scanty satisfaction they can extort from reality. 'We simply cannot do without auxiliary constructions', Theodor Fontane once said, "His followers saw rest and wish fulfilment (in small measures) as useful tools in adjusting to traumatic upset"; while later psychologists have highlighted the role of vicarious distractions in shifting unwanted moods, especially anger and sadness.

However, if permanent residence is taken up in some such psychic retreats, the results will often be negative and even pathological. Drugs cause some forms of escapism which can occur when certain mind-altering drugs are taken which make the participant forget the reality of where they are or what they are meant to be doing.

== Escapist societies ==
Some social critics warn of attempts by the powers that control society to provide means of escapism instead of bettering the condition of the people – what Juvenal called "bread and the games".

Social philosopher Ernst Bloch wrote that utopias and images of fulfillment, however regressive they might be, also included an impetus for a radical social change. According to Bloch, social justice could not be realized without seeing things fundamentally differently. Something that is mere "daydreaming" or "escapism" from the viewpoint of a technological-rational society might be a seed for a new and more humane social order, as it can be seen as an "immature, but honest substitute for revolution".

Escapist societies appear often in literature. The Time Machine depicts the Eloi, a lackadaisical, insouciant race of the future, and the horror of their happy lifestyle beliefs. The novel subtly criticizes capitalism, or at least classism, as a means of escape. Escapist societies are common in dystopian novels; for example, in the Fahrenheit 451 society, television and "seashell radios" are used to escape a life with strict regulations and the threat of a forthcoming war. In science fiction media escapism is often depicted as an extension of social evolution, as society becomes detached from physical reality and processing into a virtual one, examples include the virtual world of Oz in the 2009 Japanese animated science fiction film Summer Wars and the game "Society" in the 2009 American science fiction film Gamer, a play on the real-life MMO game Second Life. Other escapist societies in literature include The Reality Bug by D. J. McHale, where an entire civilization leaves their world in ruin while they 'jump' into their perfect realities. The aim of the anti-hero becomes a quest to make their realities seemingly less perfect to regain control over their dying planet.

== Escape scale ==
The Norwegian psychologist Frode Stenseng has presented a dualistic model of escapism in relation to different types of activity engagements. He discusses the paradox that the flow state (Csikszentmihalyi) resembles psychological states obtainable through actions such as drug abuse, sexual masochism, and suicide ideation (Baumeister). Accordingly, he deduces that the state of escape can have both positive and negative meanings and outcomes. Stenseng argues that there exist two forms of escapism with different affective outcomes dependent on the motivational focus that lies behind the immersion in the activity. Escapism in the form of self-suppression stems from motives to run away from unpleasant thoughts, self-perceptions, and emotions, whereas self-expansion stems from motives to gain positive experiences through the activity and to discover new aspects of self. Stenseng has developed the "escape scale" to measure self-suppression and self-expansion in people's favorite activities, such as sports, arts, and gaming. Empirical investigations of the model have shown that:

- the two dimensions are distinctively different with regard to affective outcomes
- some individuals are more prone to engage through one type of escapism
- situational levels of well-being affect the type of escapism that becomes dominant at a specific time

== During the Great Depression ==
Alan Brinkley, author of Culture and Politics in the Great Depression, presents how escapism became the new trend for dealing with the hardships created by the stock market crash in 1929: magazines, radio and movies, all were aimed to help people mentally escape from the mass poverty and economic downturn. Life magazine, which became hugely popular during the 1930s, was said to have pictures that give "no indication that there was such a thing as depression; most of the pictures are of bathing beauties and ship launchings and building projects and sports heroes – of almost anything but poverty and unemployment". Famous director Preston Sturges aimed to validate this notion by creating a film called Sullivan's Travels about a director of lightweight comedies wanting to make a serious message picture titled O Brother, Where Art Thou?. The film ends with a group of poor destitute men in jail watching a comedic Mickey Mouse cartoon that ultimately lifts their spirits. Sturges aims to point out how "foolish and vain and self-indulgent" it would be to make a film about suffering. Therefore, movies of the time more often than not focused on comedic plot lines that distanced people emotionally from the horrors that were occurring all around them. These films "consciously, deliberately set out to divert people from their problems", but it also diverted them from the problems of those around them.

== See also ==
- Bread and circuses
- Daydream
- Deindividuation
- Sehnsucht
- Primitivism
- Peter Pan syndrome
- Quixotism
- Self-deception
- Utopianism
- Metaverse
- Wanderlust
- Escapist fiction
- Literary fiction
- Social realism
