= The Rivers of Zadaa =

2005 novel by D. J. MacHale

- First edition cover
- Author: D. J. MacHale
- Cover artist: Victor Lee
- Language: English
- Series: Pendragon
- Genre: Fantasy novel
- Publisher: Simon & Schuster
- Publication date: June 28, 2005
- Publication place: United States
- Media type: Print (Hardback)
- Pages: 405 pp (first edition, hardback)
- ISBN: 1-4169-0710-6 (first edition, hardback)
- OCLC: 57393076
- LC Class: PZ7.M177535 Ri 2005
- Preceded by: Black Water
- Followed by: The Quillan Games

The Rivers of Zadaa is the sixth novel in the Pendragon series by D. J. MacHale.

== Plot introduction ==
This story takes place mainly on a territory called Zadaa. There will be two main tribes here: The Rokador and the Batu. The Rokador live in tunnels and are fair-skinned, while the Batu are dark-skinned and live in a sunbathed city called Xhaxhu in the desert. For years, the Rokador have relied on the Batu to protect them from other savage tribes on Zadaa, and the Batu have relied on the Rokador to provide them with water. But the Rokador seem to be holding back the water, causing all the Batu to starve.

== Plot summary ==
As in the other Pendragon books, this book covers Bobby's adventures and those of Mark and Courtney, his friends on Second Earth. Bobby's adventures are chronicled as an epistolary novel and those of his friends in the third-person narrative.

=== Zadaa ===
The story starts after Bobby Pendragon has spoken with Loor, who explains to him, the lead Traveler and main character, the situation on Zadaa, introduces Bobby to her sister and her acolyte Saangi and her friends, Bokka and Teek. Soon afterwards, Saint Dane, who is disguised as a Batu warrior, beats Bobby up with a wooden staff. Bobby is almost killed but is rescued by Pelle a Zinj, the kind prince, and recovers quickly in a Batu hospital. After Bobby has recovered, he decides to start training to be a warrior. Alder, the Traveler from Denduron, joins Loor and Saangi to help train him. For 3 weeks, Bobby works hard in a deserted training camp. Finally, at the end of the 3 weeks, they all celebrate his successful training but are interrupted by an attack by a group of Rokador, who shoots Bokka with several arrows and flees. As Bokka dies, he gives Bobby and Loor a map to the underground city Kidik, and tells them that Saint Dane is there.

Loor and Bobby decide to attend the Batu Festival of Azhra first, because Pelle a Zinj has invited them personally. At the festival, Pelle a Zinj is killed by a Rokador. After this, it rains, but still there is no ready supply water for the Batu. This convinces the Batu that the Rokador are indeed holding back the water and they start making preparations for war. Meanwhile, Bobby and Loor begin their journey to the city of Kidik. There, they find an underground ocean of fresh water. They take a boat across this, arriving on an island where Saint Dane finds them and puts them in a prison-like room. Bobby and Loor later escape and learn that after an epidemic virus had killed most of the Rokador, Saint Dane was able to convince the survivors to attack the Batu. The plan was to hold back the water, making the Batu starve; when the Batu attacked, the Rokador would flood the entire village, drowning all.

Saangi and Alder join Bobby and Loor. As the Rokador prepare to flood the underground, the protagonists foil their plans by flooding it prematurely, presumably to the ruin of both tribes. Rather than abandon one another, warriors of both tribes co-operate to escape the flood. The heroes escape from the floods by riding a "dygo", the machine that the Rokador use for making tunnels. All the water shoots out from the underground and creates a river which flows by the city of Xhaxhu, providing water for both people.

Bobby then returns to Loor's house, where he attempts to share a kiss with her. She refuses him, arguing that to become lovebirds would distract them from their purpose of preventing the destruction of Halla. Bobby accepts this without complaint.

Bobby goes back to the flume to try to return to Second Earth (Earth in modern-times), whereupon Saint Dane comes out of the flume in a fury and kills Loor with a sword. He then tries to kill Bobby, but Bobby uses his training to disarm him. Bobby then raises the same sword that killed Loor as Saint Dane jumped on top of him, impaling him in a way that should have killed him. However, Saint Dane disappears and reappears at the entrance to the flume, proving the suggestion given in earlier books that he cannot be killed. Saint Dane then travels to a territory called Quillan.

Bobby goes back to Loor. His own desire that she lives rather than dies appears to resurrect or revive her, in that her wound closes of its own accord while she resumes full faculty, memory, and mobility. Moments later, Bobby gets a message from Quillan from people named Veego and LaBerge; to investigate this, he embarks for Quillan. The final journal ends with him writing his record in what is revealed to be the residence of those who sent him the message.

=== Second Earth ===
The story begins when Mark and Courtney have realized that they have accidentally destroyed the flume to Eelong trying to help Bobby. Courtney therefore becomes severely depressed and stops coming to school.

Eventually she decides to go to summer school for six weeks in order to recover, so that Mark is left to read Bobby's journals alone. Throughout the summer, Mark collects Bobby's journals and reads them, and begins to have conversations with Andy Mitchell, the former school bully. Mark soon realizes that Mitchell is an adept in mathematics and became a bully for having been a misfit. Gradually Mark and Mitchell become friends.

At her summer school, Courtney meets a boy named Whitney Wilcox, whom she befriends and of whom she begins to entertain romantic thoughts. Before long, he invites her out for pizza. En route, she is struck down by a black car which seems to have been following her. From the car emerges Whitney, who is here revealed to be Saint Dane. Looking upon Courtney, he remarks cryptically "I give, and I take away" and departs in the form of a raven. As Courtney loses consciousness as a result of her injuries, she sends a cellphone message to Mark, who upon inferring that she is in danger convinces Andy Mitchell to drive him to Courtney's summer school. There they find Courtney, badly injured and unconscious. They call the local ambulance and hurry Courtney to the hospital. Courtney slowly begins to recover. In the last scene of the book, Courtney's heart rate suddenly begins to slow, whereupon Andy Mitchell, unseen, brings it to normal by a means, implied, to be the same kind of "thing" used by Bobby to revive Loor. This suggests that Andy Mitchell is another alter-ego assumed by Saint Dane.

== Characters ==
- Bobby Pendragon: A teenage boy who used to live a normal life until his uncle took him through time and space to a "territory" called Denduron, where he stopped an evil man named Saint Dane from causing chaos and destruction. Since then, he has been to many other worlds, battling Saint Dane. In this book, he goes to Zadaa.
- Saint Dane: An evil human-like "demon" who wants to send Halla (everything/everybody that ever existed and everything/everybody that will ever exist) into chaos, then he will rebuild it in his image. He is able to change shape, making his discovery difficult.
- Loor: The Traveler from Zadaa, Bobby's friend. Loor is a Batu warrior, living according to a strict discipline. Bobby has admitted to desiring her love, and she has admitted to reciprocating his feelings. Bobby has also admitted that Loor was hot after seeing her in Zadaa festival clothing. They have agreed to set their love aside to fulfill their mission.
- Saangi: Loor's acolyte; also her sister. Not related by blood. She took her job very seriously.
- Pelle a Zinj: A Batu prince from Zadaa who is very kind but who is assassinated by a Rokador during an important Batu ceremony. Pelle wanted peace between the Rokador and the Batu tribes. He is killed by a Rokador that Saint Dane probably sent.
- Bokka: A Rokador, who has known Loor since she was born and is one of her closest friends. He is described as handsome. Had it not been for Loor's being a Traveler, she and Bokka would have most likely ended up together. He is killed by Rokador assassins with a shot of an arrow straight through the chest.
- Teek: Bokka's best friend, also a Rokador.
- Alder: The Traveler from Denduron. Alder comes to Zadaa to help Bobby train to be a warrior.
- Mark Dimond: Bobby's best friend from Second Earth and also one of Bobby's acolytes.
- Courtney Chetwynde: Bobby's girlfriend from Second Earth and also one of Bobby's acolytes.

== Reception ==
Torin Kelley, writing for Children's Book and Media Review, called the book "an excellent read", noting that "the journal style writing really draws you in", and "McHale keeps you captivated with new and difficult challenges". Discussing the novel's overarching messaging, Kelley highlighted the book showcases "the importance of moving on and learning from mistakes and not backing down from a challenge".

It was also reviewed by Walter Minkel in School Library Journal, Arlene Garcia in Voice of Youth Advocates, and James Blasingame in the Journal of Adolescent & Adult Literacy.
