= Tower of Terror (1997 film) =

Film by D. J. MacHale

- VHS cover
- Based on: Disney's Tower of Terror
- Written by: D. J. MacHale
- Directed by: D. J. MacHale
- Starring: Steve Guttenberg; Kirsten Dunst; Alastair Duncan; Melora Hardin; John Franklin; Wendy Worthington; Amzie Strickland; Lindsay Ridgeway; Nia Peeples; Michael McShane
- Music by: Louis Febre
- Country of origin: United States
- Original language: English

Production
- Executive producers: D. J. MacHale; George Zalooom; Les Mayfield; Joey Plager
- Producer: Iain Paterson
- Cinematography: Stephen McNutt
- Editor: Barry Zetlin
- Running time: 89 minutes
- Production companies: Zaloom/Mayfield Productions; Walt Disney Television

Original release
- Network: ABC
- Release: October 26, 1997

Tower of Terror is a 1997 American supernatural horror television film written and directed by D. J. MacHale, and starring Steve Guttenberg and Kirsten Dunst. It is based on the theme-park attraction, The Twilight Zone Tower of Terror, at the Walt Disney World Resort in Bay Lake, Florida, and aired on ABC on October 26, 1997, as a presentation of The Wonderful World of Disney. It is Disney's first film based on one of its theme-park attractions, and the only one produced for television.

The film, which has no connection to any incarnation of The Twilight Zone, was partly filmed at the actual attraction in Disney-MGM Studios (now known as Disney's Hollywood Studios), while the rest was filmed on a stage in Hollywood, Los Angeles. As of 2025, the film is not available on any streaming service nor is it available to purchase new on physical media.

== Plot ==
Journalist Buzzy Crocker writes for a supermarket tabloid, The National Inquisitor, after his termination from the Los Angeles Banner (where his then-girlfriend Jill works as editor) for publishing a fake news story. Helping him in his job is young niece Anna, with whom he is close friends. Sometime later, an elderly woman named Abigail Gregory comes to visit Buzzy, and explains that on Halloween in 1939, she was witness to a bizarre incident in the Hollywood Tower Hotel, when five hotel guests – singer Carolyn Crosson, Crosson's boyfriend: actor Gilbert London, (Note: The novelization, written by Ron Fontes and Justine Korman, refers to Gilbert as Gilbert Lawrence.) much-loved child star Sally Shine, her nanny Emeline Partridge, and bellhop Dewey Todd, (Note: Dewey Todd appears in D. J. MacHale's 2003 novel, The Never War, book 3 of his series The Pendragon Adventure. The Manhattan Tower Hotel is also a major setting, the sister to the Hollywood Tower Hotel. Additionally, in The Pilgrims of Rayne, Dewey Todd is reported missing, as he was in an elevator in the Hollywood Tower Hotel the moment it was struck by lightning.) – mysteriously disappeared without a trace when lightning struck the elevator they were in on their way up to a party at the hotel's Tip Top Club.

Abigail states that the nanny, Emeline, was a bitter witch who tried to put a curse on Sally, only for the curse to misfire, trapping all five of the people who were in the elevator as ghosts, who haunt the hotel. Buzzy investigates the shuttered hotel and finds a book of spells mentioned in Abigail's story, also discovering the curse can be reversed by its "contrary". Abigail also explains that items belonging to the passengers must be found, and what happened in 1939 must be repeated to break the curse. Buzzy and Anna enlist the help of Chris "Q" Todd, the hotel caretaker and grandson of Dewey Todd. Q is reluctant, but he decides to help his deceased grandfather and the four guests, especially as he stands to inherit the hotel if an explanation to the 1939 event is revealed.

Inside the hotel, Buzzy and Anna meet an actress named "Claire Poulet", who had been hired so Buzzy could take fake pictures of the "ghosts" for the supermarket tabloid. Buzzy tries to develop a relationship with Claire, but she is dismayed when Buzzy expresses more interest in restoring his career than helping the spirits. Fearing an intrusion, some of the ghosts appear and repeatedly attempt to frighten off Buzzy and Anna, but Anna steadfastly offers to help the ghosts escape the curse. Finally, the ghost of Carolyn appears. Apparent immediately, she is the same "Claire Poulet" to whom Buzzy already talked. Anna accuses Emeline of cursing the other guests, but a shocked Emeline states her innocence, to which the other ghosts agree.

Researching Buzzy's story, Jill discovers that Abigail is the sister of Sally Shine. Abigail was secretly jealous of her younger sister's talents and fame. Although Halloween was Abigail's birthday, no one seemed to have remembered. After finding out that Abigail caused the curse, she also discovers that Abigail has been in a sanitarium ever since, but is allowed out on day release.

Buzzy realizes that finding the personal effects of the guests (a lock of Sally's hair, Ms. Partridge's handkerchief, Dewey's spare bell-boy hat, Gilbert's Oxford spectacles, and Carolyn's locket) and repairing the elevator have given Abigail the means to complete the curse. He and Jill rush back to the hotel, but they are too late. Unaware that they are about to walk into a trap, Carolyn, Gilbert, Dewey, Emeline, and Sally enter the repaired elevator. Anna runs in, but only Sally makes it out of the elevator before the doors close and the car moves up the shaft. The group confronts Abigail, who then tearfully admits her actions before Sally appears.

The elevator continues to move up, but gets stuck on the 11th floor again, with only minutes left before the final phase of the curse takes effect. Sally explains that the party was a surprise birthday party for Abigail and apologizes to Abigail for not being able to get to it, but of course, Abigail did not know about it. Sally has kept the present she wanted to give to Abby - a golden friendship bracelet with two hearts engraved with their names - assuming she would forgive her. Buzzy then explains that Abigail was the one who started the curse all out of jealousy over Sally, which makes Sally surprised that Abigail is an old woman now and was the one responsible. Abigail is distraught at her mistake, but does not know how to stop the spell. Buzzy, Q, Jill, Abby, and Sally board the service elevator, catching up with the others on the 11th floor. Anna manages to leap from an emergency escape hatch, rejoining Buzzy and the others, but at exactly 8:05 pm, lightning strikes the hotel again, and both cars plummet towards the basement. Amid the chaos, Sally and Abby reconcile, breaking the curse. As they hold hands, they both dissolve into a shower of golden sparkles that safely stops both elevators just before they crash.

Buzzy and his group follow up behind as Carolyn, Gilbert, Dewey, Emeline, and Sally finally ascend to the party at the Tip-Top Club, restored to its former glory; Gilbert proposes to Carolyn after the latter performs for the party. One by one, the ghosts then ascend to Heaven, along with the other partygoers. Abigail, now a child again, appears with Sally, and thanks her for the present. The sisters then hold hands and vanish into golden sparkles, reversing the curse on the hotel. With the spell broken, the Hollywood Tower Hotel is restored and reopened to the public, with Q taking charge as the new owner.

== Cast ==
- Steve Guttenberg as Buzzy Crocker
- Kirsten Dunst as Anna Petterson
- Nia Peeples as Jill Perry
- Michael McShane as Chris "Q" Todd
- Amzie Strickland as Abigail "Abby" Gregory
  - Shira Roth as Young Abby
- Melora Hardin as Carolyn Crosson / Claire Poulet
- Alastair Duncan as Gilbert London
- Lindsay Ridgeway as Sally "Sally Shine" Gregory
- John Franklin as Dewey Todd
- Wendy Worthington as Emeline Partridge
- Lela Ivey as Patricia Petterson
- Richard Minchenberg as Dr. Daniels
- Marcus Smythe as The Surgeon
- Don Perry as Great Grand Dad
- Michael Waltman as Reporter
- Ben Kronen as Mr. Galvao
- Bill Elliott as Bandleader
- Lynne Donahoe as Chloe
- Dean Marsico as Photographer

== Production ==
=== Writing ===
DJ MacHale was chosen to write the film, and he finished his draft March 20, 1997. The film was written without any attachment to The Twilight Zone brand. Executive producer George Zaloom said, "What we've done is to create a story line based on some action things that occur at the attraction." He went on to say, "We've taken the free-fall elevator, as well as the Hollywood milieu, and have come up with a whole scenario."

On March 22, 1997, when it was announced that ABC would be reviving The Wonderful World of Disney, it was revealed that Kirsten Dunst would be starring in a new film for their Sunday line up, entitled Tower of Terror.

=== Filming ===
According to Knight Ridder, filming began in May 1997.

When asked why the film would be shot in California, rather than at Disney-MGM Studios' production facilities, Disney spokesperson Craig Martinelli said, "...it's logistics more than anything else." But he did go on to say exterior shots would be filmed at the Orlando attraction in the summer of 1997.

== Release ==
To promote the film, on October 16, 1997, Kirsten Dunst appeared on Live with Regis and Kathie Lee.

On Tuesday, October 21, Dunst appeared at Disney-MGM Studios to sign novelizations of Tower of Terror in front of The Twilight Zone Tower of Terror. The following day, she participated in the handprint ceremony at the park, then hosted a Q&A at the Theater of the Stars.

== Reception ==
The Olympian called the film, "a fairly interesting tale," and applauded MacHale, saying, "[he] has directed beautifully."

== See also ==
- List of ghost films
- List of films set around Halloween
