= Carla Speed McNeil =

American comics creator

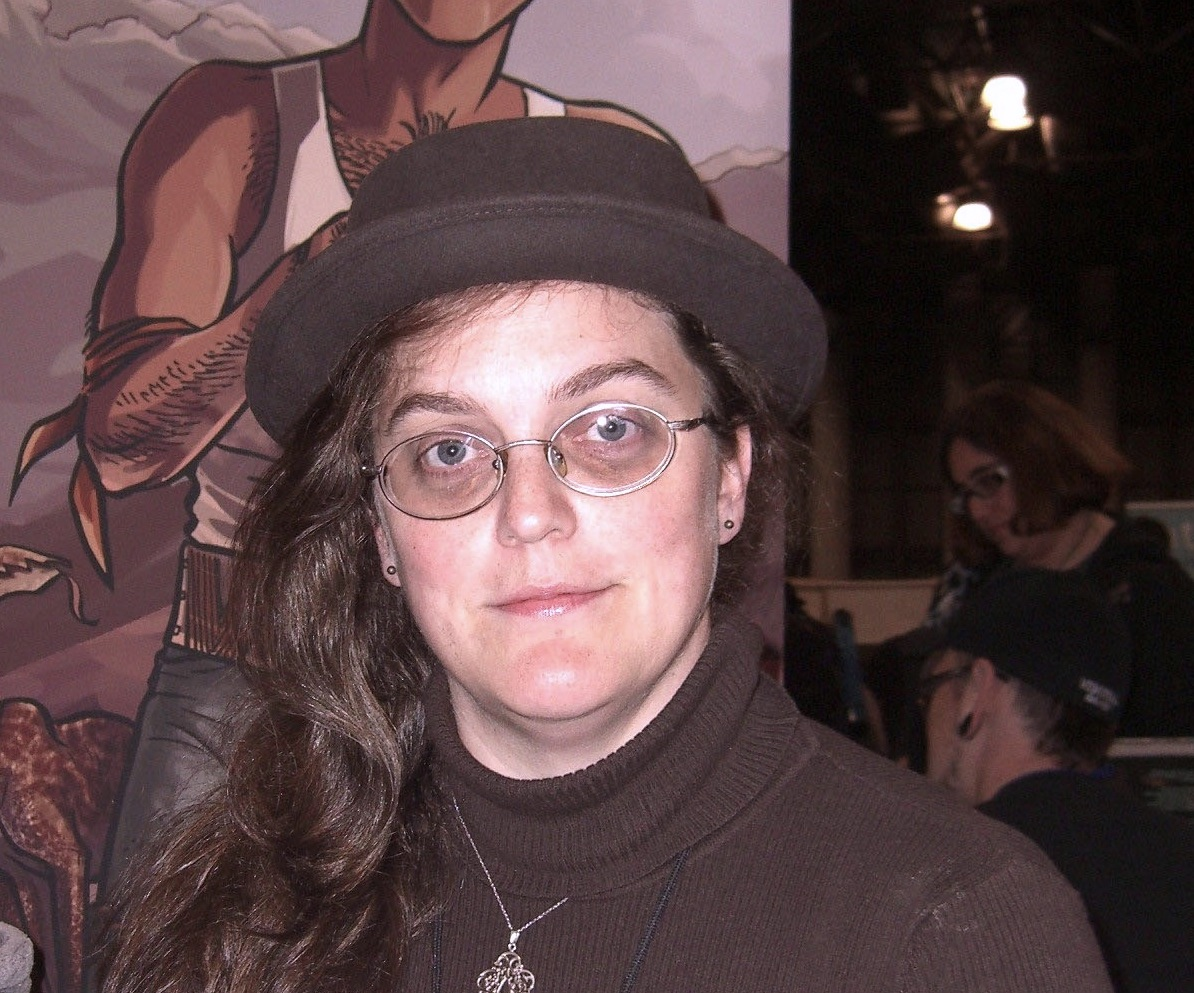
- McNeil at the New York Comic Con in Manhattan, October 10, 2010
- Areas: Cartoonist, Writer, Penciller, Inker, Editor, Publisher, Letterer
- Notable works: Finder
- Awards: Lulu Award, Ignatz Award, Eisner Award

Carla Speed McNeil is an American science fiction writer, cartoonist, and illustrator of comics, best known for the science fiction comic book series Finder.

== Career ==
McNeil's chief work is the ongoing science fiction comic series Finder, which they began self-publishing in 1996. In 2005, they started to publish Finder as a webcomic. The comic was published and available to read on their website until it began to be published by Dark Horse Comics in 2011.

A majority of McNeil's career is focused on collaborations with other comic artists and writers. In 2001, McNeil provided a two-page guest-illustrator spot for Warren Ellis' Transmetropolitan: Filth of the City. They continued their work with him in 2005 by illustrating the one-shot "Frank Ironwine" in Ellis' Apparat Volume 1." McNeil also worked as an illustrator alongside Greg Rucka on the Oni Press series Queen & Country in 2004. In 2008, McNeil adapted and illustrated D. J. MacHale's first Pendragon book, The Merchant of Death, into a graphic novel, and it was released by Simon and Schuster on May 20, 2008. In 2013, McNeil participated in multiple collaborations with other artists. They collaborated with Alex de Campi for two comics: they illustrated a few pages of the graphic novel Ashes, as well as the first issue of My Little Pony: Friends Forever, which was released by IDW Publishing. They also did illustrative work for Devin Grayson's Legends of Red Sonja. Together with Sara Ryan, they released Bad Houses in 2013 from Dark Horse Comics, which received general acclaim upon release. In April 2015, McNeil started illustrating No Mercy, a series written by Alex de Campi and colored by Jenn Manley Lee. The series is published by Image Comics, and is ongoing.

McNeil has also worked on numerous anthologies throughout their career. In 2005, McNeil wrote a comic for the anthology Dignifying Science, which is a collection about women scientists. They have also illustrated Elizabeth Genco's "Here. In My Head" for the 2008 anthology Comic Book Tattoo, which is a collection based on the songs of Tori Amos. They have done work for Saucy Goose Press' anthology Smut Peddler, which is a collection of comics centered around sex positivity. McNeil wrote and drew a story in the first edition, and illustrated the cover and end piece of Smut Peddler: 2014 Edition, which was one of the most successful Kickstarter comics of 2014. They wrote and drew the story "Frog and Snake Never Play Together" for the popular anthology Cautionary Fables and Fairy Tales Vol 2: Africa Edition in 2014.

In 2015, McNeil wrote and illustrated "Both Ends of the Leash," a story that appeared in Sensation Comics Featuring Wonder Woman, for DC Comics.

== Awards ==
In 1997, at San Diego Comic-Con, McNeil won the Lulu Awards' Kimberly Yale Award for Best New Talent for their work on Finder and Shanda the Panda. McNeil also won the Ignatz Award for Promising New Talent in 1998.

McNeil was nominated for Lulu Award Lulu of the Year in 2001 and 2002, and for an Ignatz Award for Outstanding Artist in 2001. Finder won the Ignatz for Outstanding Series in 2004 and 2005. Their work has been nominated for Eisner Awards in several categories over the years (including "Best Writer/Artist" in 2002 and 2003, and "Best Lettering" for Finder and Bad Houses in 2014), and won "Best Webcomic" for Finder in 2009. Finder: Voice won the 2011 Los Angeles Times Book Prize (Graphic Novel).

In recognition of their work Finder, ComicsAlliance listed McNeil as one of twelve women cartoonists deserving of lifetime achievement recognition.

In 2017, Finder was nominated by readers for NPR's "Let's Get Graphic: 100 Favorite Comics and Graphic Novels," and was chosen for the list by a panel of award-winning comic artists.

== Bibliography ==
=== As writer and artist ===
- Cautionary Fables and Fairy Tales Vol. 2: Africa Edition (2014)
- Finder (1997–present)
- Sensation Comics Featuring Wonder Woman #15 (2015)
- Smut Peddler: Impeccable Pornoglyphics for Cultured Ladies (and Men of Exceptional Taste!) (2012)

Illustrator

- Ashes (2013)
- Bad Houses (2013)
- Comic Book Tattoo (2008)
- Legends of Red Sonja (2013)
- My Little Pony: Friends Forever #1 (2013)
- No Mercy (2015 - ongoing)
- Pendragon Graphic Novel: The Merchant of Death (2008)
- Warren Ellis' Apparat Volume 1 (2005)
- Queen and Country, Vol. 5: Operation Stormfront (2004)
- Transmetropolitan: Filth of the City (2001)

=== Cover work ===
- Smut Peddler: 2014 Edition: A Superior Pornucopia for Classy Dames (and the Forward-Thinking Gentleman) (2014)
