= Pendragon: Before the War =

Novel trilogy by Carla Jablonski and Walter Sorrells

- Cover for Book One, which focuses on Spader, Kasha and Gunny
- Author: Carla Jablonski (book one); Walter Sorrells (book two/three)
- Language: English
- Series: Pendragon
- Genre: Fantasy novel
- Publisher: Aladdin
- Publication date: January–March 2009
- Publication place: United States
- Media type: Print (Paperback and Hardback)

Pendragon: Before the War is a set of three novels that expands upon the fictional universe of The Pendragon Adventure created by writer D. J. MacHale. Although MacHale originated the primary series, the first novel of Before the War was written by Carla Jablonski, and the second and third were written by Walter Sorrells. As of November 25, 2008, all three of the covers have been revealed. The three novels intend to show what the nine Travelers other than Bobby Pendragon were doing before the beginning of MacHale's first Pendragon book, The Merchant of Death.

== The books ==
- Book One of the Travelers: The first book deals with Kasha (Eelong), Spader (Cloral), and Gunny (First Earth). Gunny's story will feature him involved in a murder case, Spader's features a part of his aquaneer training, and Kasha's will show her as she begins to see changes in parts of her life.
- Book Two of the Travelers: The second book features Elli Winter (Quillan), Aja Killian (Veelox), and Alder (Denduron). Elli's story shows when she first discovers Mr. Pop, Alder's shows him learning what it takes to be a Bedoowan Knight, and Aja's features a competition between her and a classmate. This second book was released February 24, 2009.
- Book Three of the Travelers: The third, and final, book features Patrick Mac (Third Earth), Siry Remudi (Ibara), and Loor (Zadaa). Patrick's story shows him trying to find the culprit in a series of burning books, Loor is sent to retrieve a stolen item in her story, and Siry's story includes him meeting a captured flighter and the troubles that follow.
