= The Pilgrims of Rayne =

Book by D.J. MacHale

- First edition cover
- Author: D. J. MacHale
- Cover artist: Victor Lee
- Language: English
- Series: Pendragon
- Genre: Fantasy novel
- Publisher: Simon & Schuster
- Publication date: May 8, 2007
- Publication place: United States
- Media type: Print (Hardcover)
- Pages: 547
- ISBN: 1-4169-1416-1
- OCLC: 78993223
- LC Class: PZ7.M177535 Pil 2007
- Preceded by: The Quillan Games
- Followed by: Raven Rise

The Pilgrims of Rayne is the eighth book in D. J. MacHale's Pendragon series. On October 17, 2006, D. J. MacHale announced the title would be The Pilgrims of Rayne in place of the previously announced title, Pendragon the Great. The book was released on May 8, 2007.

== Summary ==
=== Journal #28 ===
Bobby and Courtney arrive on Third Earth only to find that it has changed quite noticeably. Patrick, the local Traveler, arrives and takes them to the library to find out about their friend Mark, whom they believe is on First Earth. Startlingly, information pertaining to Mark originates from both First Earth and Second Earth. Both sources tell of him disappearing. In the flume, on First Earth November 1, 1937, Courtney and Bobby run into a dado (a type of android) in ragged clothing. Bobby tells Courtney to escape while he fights it off. Soon the dado backs into the tunnel and into an oncoming train. The dado is torn in half. Bobby takes the pieces to the flume and sends it back to Quillan. Then Bobby goes to First Earth to find Mark but he knows that Ibara needs him so he goes there and leaves Courtney behind.

=== Ibara ===
Bobby is in Ibara, the next territory he must save from Saint Dane's plans. Though the people there live simply, by growing or fishing for their food and living in grass huts, there are signs of advanced civilization, including artificial lights and other technological advances. No one, whether out of ignorance or desire to conceal, can explain these anachronisms.

Bobby meets the Jakills, a group of teens outside of the main social group, who are determined to discover the truth of Ibara's unusual character. Leading them is Siry, Remudi's son. Bobby agrees to join the Jakills after proving his skills against a group of Flighters (humanoids that attack Ibara relentlessly). Together the Jakills and Bobby steal a ship and set off to find the truth. They eventually land in a city known as Rubity, a city far away from Rayne.

Bobby, Siry, and a few of the Jakills explore Rubity. After a while, Bobby discovers that Ibara is a manifest future version of Veelox/an island on the territory Veelox and that Rubity is Rubic City, 300 years after Bobby failed to stop Saint Dane from causing chaos there.

The Flighters attack them as they find this out, however, and only Bobby and Siry make it back to the ship, which they find is burning. They believe that most of the Jakills are killed, apparently leaving only Bobby and Siry alive. They escape from the enraged Flighters, only to meet Saint Dane in the now abandoned Lifelight pyramid.

Aja Killian's journal is interrupted by Saint Dane. Bobby then finds out that the Jakills' name comes from Aja Killian [aJAKILLian] and that Flighters were the people who didn't leave Lifelight [liFeLIGHTERS].

Saint Dane reveals that he is bringing an army of tens of thousands of dados to Ibara to make Veelox's second turning point a disaster. Bobby and Siry barely escape on Skimmers, which are high speed boats from Cloral, brought by Saint Dane.

The two of them get back to Ibara and tell the ruling Tribunal what has happened. The Tribunal then reveals that the ship that the Jakills stole was one of ten ships that they were going to use to repopulate Veelox. After sending them out early, the ships are destroyed by Flighters, and the threat of the impending army looms on the horizon.

Bobby and Siry travel to Veelox to obtain maps of Ibara from Aja Killian. They then go to Zadaa to borrow a dygo, then to Denduron in order to unearth the explosive tak. When they leave, the Traveler Alder goes with them. Bobby then goes to Quillan alone in order to get the black dado-killing rods for extra protection.

After a gigantic battle with archers firing tak at the dados, it appears that the battle is won. When a second wave of dados arrive, Bobby throws almost all the tak they have left in a tunnel and lures the army over it. As he is about to detonate the tak, Saint Dane catches up with Bobby and has a fight with him, in which he reveals that there is a "King of the territories", and that he wants to be it. When Bobby asks who the king is now, Saint Dane merely says, "And now you see the truth..."

Siry arrives in time to prevent Bobby from being killed, and Bobby blows up the tak bomb. The dado army is destroyed but as they begin to celebrate, Bobby decides that the time has come to go after Saint Dane.

Bobby goes with Siry and Alder to take the various things they had taken from the other territories back to their places of origin. After they leave, Bobby destroys the flume with a tak arrow, trapping both himself and Saint Dane on Ibara. Bobby hopes that this means Halla is safe.

In the final chapter, however, Saint Dane and his accomplice Nevva Winter speak on top of the Lifelight pyramid. By unearthing the tak, Bobby has doomed Denduron. Just as Saint Dane had said long ago, Denduron would be the first territory to fall. It is revealed that Saint Dane has more power in realizing the future of Halla than thought, and that Telleo is actually Nevva Winter in disguise.

== Trivia ==
It is said that Dewey Todd went to manage a hotel in Hollywood, CA. This is a reference to the Tower of Terror film where a person named Dewey Todd is a bellhop who manages the elevator. In the movie and the book, the elevator was struck by lightning and neither of them survive, just as the relationship between Gunny and Dodger developed.

The working title of the book, Pendragon the Great, was posted on the cover of The Quillan Games.
