= The Quillan Games =

Book by D. J. MacHale

- First edition cover
- Author: D. J. MacHale
- Cover artist: Victor Lee
- Language: English
- Series: Pendragon
- Genre: Science fiction
- Published: May 16, 2006 Simon & Schuster
- Publication place: United States
- Media type: Print (Hardback)
- Pages: 486 pp (first edition, hardback)
- ISBN: 978-1-4169-1423-5 (first edition, hardback)
- OCLC: 62492955
- LC Class: PZ7.M177535 Qui 2006
- Preceded by: The Rivers of Zadaa
- Followed by: The Pilgrims of Rayne

The Quillan Games is the seventh book in D.J. MacHale's Pendragon book series. The book takes place after The Rivers of Zadaa and was released on May 16, 2006 in Canada and the US. It was released on November 16, 2006 in the United Kingdom, Australia, New Zealand and in other countries.

== Setting ==
The story takes place on a territory called Quillan, in the city of Rune, whose population live dreary lives under the rule of the megacorporation "BLOK". Many people gamble on the eponymous games in hope of a better life; but may lose their lives, their families, or their professions if the bet fails. The games' celebrity players are called 'challengers', and often kill each other during the competition.

== Plot summary ==
Like the other Pendragon books, The Quillan Games follows protagonist Bobby Pendragon's adventures on Quillan, while showing his friends Mark Dimond and Courtney Chetwynde on their home territory of Second Earth.

=== Pendragon ===
Upon arrival on Quillan, Bobby witnesses a fellow Traveler die in the games; but is soon captured by the android 'dados' of Quillan's police force, and recruited as a 'challenger' by the siblings LaBerge and Veego. He is also befriended by another Traveler, Nevva Winter, who explains the social situation. Subsequently, antagonist Saint Dane offers a 'secret' of the Travelers to Bobby, in exchange for Bobby's participation in the Grand X, an upcoming series of games. Bobby initially refuses; but is persuaded to join the Grand X by a secret society of 'revivers' bent on overthrowing Blok. Before this competition, Bobby learns that LaBerge and Veego originated the territory of Veelox, but were taken to Quillan by Saint Dane, and later shown Eelong, Cloral, and Zadaa from which they derive the games' structure. Ultimately, Bobby wins the game and the support of the people, who revolt against Blok; but Nevva, secretly in league with Saint Dane, reveals the revivers' archive 'Mr. Pop' to the dados, who suppress the rebellion. In leaving Quillan, Bobby encounters Nevva's mother, Elli Winter, who assumes the position of Traveler.

=== Mark and Courtney ===
Courtney recovers from near-fatal injuries inflicted by Saint Dane, while Mark studies science with Andy Mitchell, a former school bully, with whom he invents "Forge", a mechanized polymer capable of assuming geometric shapes on command. En route to witness the display thereof in Florida, Mark's parents are killed by the collapse of their aircraft, and Mark flees to another territory. Courtney, investigating this, discovers Saint Dane, who identifies Andy Mitchell as an alter-ego of his own, and returns her to Second Earth. There, Courtney discovers a lifelike robotic cat, and an unusually-advanced computer. When Bobby returns to Second Earth, he and Courtney discover these technologies trademarked 'Dimond Alpha Digital Organization'. Suspecting this name to derive from Mark's own, they also realize that the initials spell the word DADO, the name of the robot police on Quillan. Hoping to discover the precise changes made in Earth's history, they embark for Third Earth, concluding the book.

Characters in The Quillan Games

- Bobby Pendragon: Pendragon is the lead Traveler from Second Earth. He becomes a member of the revival and also becomes Challenger Red in this book.
- Saint Dane: Saint Dane is the antagonist of the story. He said to Bobby if he competed in the Quillan Games, he will tell him the truth about the Travelers. He acted as a Blok Trustee Mr. Kayto, and Challenger Green a competitor who competed in the Quillan Games. At the end of the book he revealed a mysterious event he called "The Convergence".
- Nevva Winter: Nevva is the adopted daughter of Elli Winter. She pretends to be Traveler but she betrays them after Nevva had destroy Mr. Pop. She works for Blok but also was a member of the revival.
- Elli Winter: Elli is the adopted mother of Nevva Winter. She takes her place as a Traveler when Nevva joined sides with Saint Dane.
- Mark Dimond: Mark is an acolyte of Bobby Pendragon on Second Earth. In this book Mark created an invention called "Forge" along with Andy Mitchell (who later to be reveal to be Saint Dane in disguise). Mark had run away from Second Earth in the end of the Quillan Games knowing that the flume would be destroyed.
- Courtney Chetwynde: Courtney is an acolyte of Bobby in Second Earth. She later came back home after her accident with Whitney Wilcox in the book "The Rivers of Zadaa".
- Veego: She is the co-host of the Quillan Games. She has a gruff attitude over Bobby. Veego was recently from Veelox, but was brought to Quillan, after Saint Dane in the form of Mr. Kayto arrived on Veelox.
- LaBerge: He is the co-host of the Quillan Games alongside his sister Veego. He was the one who designed the games while Veego makes them real. LaBerge was a former phader in Veelox, and was also brought to Quillan, when Saint Dane came in the form of Mr. Kayto. He enjoys clowns, playing a toy called Runkle, and eating a carrot known as Tribbun.
