= The Lost City of Faar =

2001 novel by D. J. MacHale

- First edition cover
- Author: D. J. MacHale
- Language: English
- Series: Pendragon
- Genre: Fantasy novel
- Publisher: Aladdin
- Publication date: January 1, 2003
- Publication place: United States
- Media type: Print (Paperback & Hardback)
- Pages: 385 pp (first edition, paperback)
- ISBN: 0-7434-3732-2 (first edition, paperback)
- OCLC: 51821293
- LC Class: MLCS 2006/42634 (P)
- Preceded by: The Merchant of Death
- Followed by: The Never War

The Lost City of Faar is the second book in the Pendragon series by D. J. MacHale.

== Plot ==
After leaving for home after his first adventure on Denduron, Bobby finds out that his entire history and proof of existence had simply vanished, including his house. After seeing this, he decides to go to Cloral in order to stop Saint Dane, a demon traveler who wants the territories to go the wrong way, so he can recreate them in his own image. After Bobby, his uncle Press, and Loor, the traveler from Zadaa, arrive at the flume, Loor heads back to Zadaa and Bobby and uncle Press head to Cloral.

When they arrive, they find the clothes used by the people of Cloral, which were brought by acolytes, people on the territories who help the travelers. They also quickly realize that Cloral is an advanced society. They swim out of the cavern they arrived in, and they are attacked by sharks. Bobby is saved by Vo Spader, the traveler from Cloral. However, Spader does not know it yet. They board a jet-ski like vehicle called a skimmer, and head to Grallion, a giant barge called a habitat that serves as a city. Grallion is a farming habitat responsible for growing food on Cloral. When they arrive, Press informs Bobby that he has to tell Spader he is the new traveler of the territory soon.

The three of them stay there for a few weeks. One day, another habitat called Magorran, which is responsible for manufacturing, suddenly appears in the distance and is speeding full throttle towards Grallion. Despite auquaneer's and the barge officers efforts, the Barge does not slow down and Magorran crashes into Grallion. Bobby, Press, and Spader board Magorran, and find that everybody on Magorran is dead due to eating poisoned crops. Spader's father was also killed, although he gets half of a map that his father wanted him to have. Just as they were trying to figure out what happened on Magorran, Grallion was attacked by raiders (the Cloran equivalent of pirates) who bombarded Grallion with water cannons.

The raiders threatened to destroy Grallion with the cannons if Grallion does not pay a fee of ten cargo barges of food. The leader of the raiders said that apparently, all habitat's food, except for Grallion's, was poisoned too. Bobby recognizes the leader, Zy Roder, as Saint Dane in disguise. Spader comes up with a solution to save Grallion- diving over to the raider's ship, they disabled the engines which provided water for the cannons. However, halfway through their plan, they are discovered and chased by the raiders.

After the raiders chased them, Bobby decided to lead Spader to the flume. (Uncle Press was left on board.) Bobby then reaches the flume with Spader and activates it, taking both of them to Zadaa. The raiders were left behind. On Zadaa, after an encounter with a Rokador, they made it to the surface and went to a Batu (the name of the tribe) tournament to find Loor. Soon after, Bobby and Loor explained to Spader about how Saint Dane wanted to destroy all the territories in Halla. Sadly, Spader was only concerned with avenging his father by killing Saint Dane, whom they suspect poisoned the crops.

Bobby and Spader flume back to Cloral, where they find themselves heroes as Grallion defeated the raiders when their cannons were useless. Saint Dane (Zy Roder) escaped on a speedboat, though.

Bobby then advises Spader to go to Panger City, another habitat, to find his mother. When they get there, they discover that the only thing left is the other half of the map to the Lost City of Faar. It is then that Bobby, Press, and Spader are confronted by Roder. He takes the map from them and looks at it, although they grab it back and escape to search for Faar.

Several hours later, they arrive right over the point where Faar is. Bobby, Press, and Spader sink down and enter the city, where they learn that the Faarians have invented something to cure the crops. They send out haulers (like a submarine) to start curing the crops. Because of this, Saint Dane knows where to strike missiles to keep the haulers inside. Press then tells Bobby and Spader to go get the people to evacuate the city, while he keeps trying to help.

Bobby and Spader warn the city and escape with them, and just afterwards the city collapses. Bobby decides to go with Spader back into the ruined city to find Press. After they find him, Bobby passes through the Council of Faar and find that the Old Man that he has talked to earlier in the book died desperately trying to reach a button. They decide to press it for him, and this causes Faar to rise back to the surface, so that now the haulers are able to get out. Saint Dane escapes, and they follow him to a second flume on Cloral, where they watch him escape to the territory of Veelox.

== Characters in "The Lost City of Faar" ==
- Bobby Pendragon - Bobby is a boy from Stony Brook, Connecticut. He was the best basketball player in his school, but right before the state semi-finals, while talking to his crush, Courtney Chetwynde, in came Uncle Press and took him to Denduron tearing Bobby's life apart. His best friend is Mark Dimond. After a while his journey led him through many dangerous missions.
- Saint Dane/Zy Roder/Po Nassi - Saint Dane is an evil Traveler that wants to destroy Halla, so he can remake it how he wants it and rule as the leader of Halla. All he needs is one territory, he says, and the other Territories will be like dominoes, falling after the first. He usually changes his name and appearance in order to pass unnoticed by the Travelers. In this book, he goes by the name Zy Roder, a pirate, and tries to attack Grallion. Also another disguise is Po Nassi, an agronomer who pushed Ty Manoo to create the fertilizer that turns crops poisonous and also makes them grow faster. His plan in this book is to find and destroy Faar so they can't send out haulers that turn the crops unpoisonous.
- Press Tilton - Press Tilton (or Uncle Press) is Robert "Bobby" Pendragon's uncle. In "The Merchant of Death", he told Bobby he was a Traveler and started him on his adventure. In the end of the book he is killed by bullets that fly through the portal to First Earth.
- Vo Spader - Spader is the Traveler from Cloral. He is an enthusiastic teen and is also the Aquaneer of the Grallion. His father died because of a fertilizer that poisoned the food in some of Cloral. Saint Dane turned out to be behind the fertilizer and now Spader needs to learn to control his anger in order to defeat Saint Dane.
- Wu Yenza - Spader's boss, a good-looking middle-aged woman who later becomes the receiver of Spader's journals, she is the Chief Aquaneer of Grallion.
- Ty Manoo - The creator of the fertilizer that turns crops poisonous. The fertilizer was supposed to speed up crop growth but made them turn deadly.
- Loor - Robert "Bobby's" traveler partner who is in Zadaa military and is a fierce fighter. They met in The Merchant of Death, and saw each other during Press's funeral in The Lost City of Faar.
- Faar council- the leaders of faar who help Robert "Bobby" bring Faar back to the surface.
- Benn Spader- The previous Traveler from Cloral and a father of Vo Spader. He gives Vo Spader a map to find the lost city of Faar

== Reception ==
Kirkus Reviews gave the book a negative review, stating that the characters and setting are flat, and the world-building "is devoid of either logic or wonder". They also criticized the main character as being unlikeable. Publishers Weekly gave a more positive review, stating that the setting would likely appeal to fans of Jules Verne's books. They also noted that the book had just enough "silly touches" to leaven the mood. Writing for the School Library Journal, Susan Rogers also gave a positive review, stating that the book had clever ideas and an exciting plot, and while the characters tended to be stereotypical in their development, they did enlist the readers' sympathy and involvement.
