= The Soldiers of Halla =

Novel by D.J. MacHale

- Author: D.J. MacHale
- Cover artist: Tim O'Brien
- Language: English
- Series: Pendragon
- Genre: Fantasy novel Science fiction
- Publisher: Simon & Schuster, Aladdin Paperbacks
- Publication date: May 12, 2009
- Publication place: United States
- Media type: Print (Hardback) (Paperback)
- Pages: 594
- ISBN: 978-1-4169-1420-4
- Preceded by: Raven Rise

The Soldiers of Halla is the tenth and final book in the Pendragon Adventure series by D. J. MacHale. It concludes the battle between the Travelers and Saint Dane. The title was revealed by D. J. MacHale on December 9, 2008, and was taken from a closing line in the preceding book, Raven Rise. The jacket cover was revealed on March 3, 2009; the book itself was released on May 12, 2009.

== Summary ==
The Soldiers of Halla begins with the eleven Travelers arriving in a ruined wasteland version of New York City on Third Earth. They are immediately attacked by mysterious helicopters, which forces them to scatter through the collapsed city. During the chaos, Bobby and Loor become separated, while others witness groups of civilians being captured. After regrouping, the Travelers are joined by allies from earlier generations, including Osa and Seegen, who help guide them toward safety. Bobby is reunited with his family, who reveal the truth behind the wasteland. It is a distorted version of the New York City zoo, shaped by the larger conflict across Halla. They also reveal the deeper cosmic reality behind everything Bobby has experienced. Halla is sustained by a balance of light and dark energy, embodied in the being known as Solara. Every victory or defeat between the Travelers and Saint Dane affects this balance. The souls of the dead feed into Solara, and the exiles who escaped through the flumes represent the last major force of positive energy resisting collapse. Bobby continues traveling across multiple territories, including Third Earth, where resistance groups are forming among the exiles. He eventually learns that Saint Dane has begun targeting these survivors across worlds. On Eelong, the Travelers confront a major assault involving both the klees and gars. They manage to repel the attack, but tensions rise over how best to preserve what remains of the exiles. Uncle Press argues for protection and preservation, while Bobby believes they must take a more aggressive approach to end the conflict. Bobby’s strategy ultimately leads the Travelers into direct confrontation with Saint Dane. In the final battle, Saint Dane is defeated as he exhausts his power. This brings the war across Halla to an end and restores balance to Solara. In the aftermath, the Travelers are granted the chance to live out the lives they would have had if they were never chosen. The story ends with an older Bobby and Courtney, hinting at a life beyond their journey, as Bobby’s journals are passed on. These journals contain the record of everything that happened, beginning the cycle of the story once again.

== Trivia ==
Bobby Pendragon wrote a grand total of 37 journals throughout his entire journey as a Traveler. Mark Dimond was the keeper of all of Bobby's Journals.
