= Morpheus Road =

Novel trilogy by D. J. MacHale

- The Light; The Black; The Blood
- Author: D. J. MacHale
- Country: United States
- Language: English
- Genre: Young adult fiction Horror
- Publisher: Aladdin
- Published: 2010 – 2012
- Media type: Print

Morpheus Road is a horror fantasy novel trilogy written by D. J. MacHale. The first book in the series, The Light, was released on April 20, 2010. The second, The Black, was released on April 19, 2011. The third and last book of the series, The Blood, was released on March 27, 2012.

== The Light ==
The first book in the series, The Light, is about a boy named Marshall "Marsh" Seaver who is being haunted by a character that he created called Gravedigger. His mother died when he was younger. He looks to his friend Cooper for help but soon figures out that he has gone missing. Marshall goes to Cooper's sister Sydney because he was chased out of his house by Gravedigger, who wants Marshall to walk the Morpheus Road, the way of life and death, with him to find the Poleax. Marshall, and Sydney then go up to the lake house where Cooper was staying for the summer. Gravedigger finds Marshall again and while trying to get away from him he swims out to a floating dock a short distance from the shore. Gravedigger appears there too. Marshall hops back into the water and while trying to swim back to shore Gravedigger grabs his foot from underneath the water and pulls him under. Sydney then comes to his aid and pulls him out of the water before he drowns, right before Gravedigger mysteriously disappears again. The book goes on to detail Marshall and Sydney's findings on the connections between Cooper being missing and the appearances of the Gravedigger. They then find out that Cooper is dead and was killed by an unknown murderer, who they discover is a character called Damon. Gravedigger attacks Marshall and Sydney in a graveyard they are in, shortly after Cooper's funeral. Sydney is carried off by a marble angel only to appear safe in her car. Gravedigger turns into the real mastermind: Damon. Marshall is saved by Cooper, who is now a spirit.

== The Black ==
The Black is the second book in the Morpheus Road trilogy and was released on April 19, 2011. The Black is in Cooper's point of view. This book explains who Damon is, where Cooper is, and gives answers to some of the questions brought forth at the end of the first book. Cooper ends up in a replica town of the one he lived in life. The Black is kind of like a place you go to after death. Everybody goes there. You get sent to Hell/ The Blood or Heaven /- based on the choices you make there and once you come to terms with your old life you move on to the options. You have to come to terms and earn forgiveness for what wrongs you did in life. All the people in the replica town had died earlier like Cooper's grandpa. He meets a girl named Maggie. Maggie knew Cooper's grandfather when they were young. Cooper stays in his grandfather's house in the Black. His grandfather shows him how to see the living but forbids him from making things happen in the living world. He meets up with Damon and Damon makes a deal with him. Cooper has to find the enemy of Damon by using his cut off ear to track him down. Damon hopes this will help him find the poleax. If he succeeds he gets to be brought back to life. Cooper has a change of heart when he meets up with Marshall's mom. She is working with the man who is leading something much like resistance against Damon. The book ends with Cooper visiting Marshall.

== The Blood ==
The Blood is the third book in the Morpheus Road Trilogy, with the title referring to the dark place where the most evil souls go after moving on from the Black. The Blood explains most of the mysteries of the previous books, such as where the evolved souls go after the Black. It also ties the entire series into the Pendragon series by revealing Solara to be the heaven to which souls go after the Black, and the "Watchers" to be the Travelers from Pendragon.

== Reception ==
Critical reception for the Morpheus Road series has been mixed to positive, with Kirkus Reviews panning both The Light and The Black, stating that The Black had "too many plot twists, too much explanation and too little motivation to keep readers journeying down this road". Publishers Weekly called The Light "Spooky and fraught with peril" but said that "as the first act in a larger piece, few answers are revealed, and numerous questions are left unresolved in anticipation of the next installment". Booklist wrote that the plot for The Light was "baldly laid out rather than elegantly spun" but that "readers will find themselves racing through this thriller". Of The Black, Booklist wrote "Fans will gobble it down and wait eagerly to see how MacHale ties it all together in the trilogy's final book". The School Library Journal positively reviewed both books, stating that The Black was "Often a little over-the-top, the narrative is intriguing enough to hook even reluctant readers."
