= Finder (comics) =

Comic book series by Carla Speed McNeil

- Author: Carla Speed McNeil
- Website: http://www.lightspeedpress.com/
- Genre: Science fiction

Finder is a science fiction comic book series written and drawn by Carla Speed McNeil, and is currently published by Dark Horse Comics. McNeil describes Finder as "aboriginal science fiction" and their storylines throw together characters from recognizable aboriginal and modern urban societies in a far-future Earth. Finder is the recipient of numerous awards and award nominations.

Finder was also listed in the British Science Fiction Association's journal Vector among six groundbreaking science fiction comics. "The world-building is immense..." and compared it to Dave Sim's Cerebus in terms of "...sheer scale of storytelling".

== Setting ==
The series is set in a vastly depopulated far-future Earth where numerous hunter-gatherer cultures, some human and some not, surround densely overpopulated domed city-states of recognizably modern urbanites functioning at a high technological level. Our own civilization and its considerably more advanced successors are lost to prehistory save for a few twentieth-century pop cultural artifacts conveniently recovered by well-paid psychics.

The cities, particularly the city state of Anvard, are dominated by wealthy and exclusive clans which self-select their members for physical and psychological homogeneity and head up a hierarchy of half-clan culls, clanless half-citizens, slaves, visiting nomads (some non-human), and genetic "constructs" with animal features. Large corporations and a decentralized info-trader/media network both wield considerable and at times quite nefarious influence. Office workers routinely jack in to virtual reality environments while walking the city as zombies.

The societies outside the domes endure less overt injustice but much more privation and danger. These include, but are not limited to, several aboriginal human cultures, an all-but-matriarchal civilization of lion-women, enigmatic raptor lizards with organs adapted specifically to brain surgery and genetic engineering, and cow-horned farmer-pirates harvesting enemy crops in giant militarized combines, and they are all constantly in low-grade conflict with each other for scarce resources.

== Characters ==
All storylines thus far feature one of two aboriginal characters although several focus chiefly on their urban contacts.

=== Jaeger ===
The main character is "Jaeger" Ayers, who is half-redneck and half "Ascian" (McNeil's stand-in culture for real-world Native Americans). Jaeger has featured in all storylines thus far, whether as protagonist or in cameos and flashbacks, although McNeil has stated the intention to continue the series without him at some future date, when his story is completed.

Jaeger is the son of an Ascian mother of whom he knows nothing, and a rural white father whose death in Jaeger's early teens set him travelling with a nomadic Ascian camp which ordained Jaeger as both a "Sin-eater," or ritual scapegoat, and a "Finder," a member of a secret society of extremely skilled hunter-trackers bound to give aid when asked. He divides his time inside and outside of cities, where he sleeps with strings of fascinated women to have a place to sleep and makes a living as fighter/killer for hire.

His personality is best characterized by his astonishing self-sufficiency, and his ability to travel nearly anywhere, relate to nearly anyone, and survive nearly anything. He's assisted in this by a nearly miraculous physical healing ability for which he himself has no explanation. Both of these gifts are balanced by self-destructive tendencies, a need to sustain (or self-inflict) serious physical injuries to remain healthy, and a corresponding (and seemingly connected) inability to remain in any one place or relationship for long. There are hints that he is aging slowly or not at all.

=== Vary ===
Vary L. S. (Lakya Sagarananda) Krishna, who is the main character of only one story collection thus far, has come to the big city from a Hautami (Indian (Asian)) community. She's joint-majoring in anthropology and prostitution, the latter recognized as a prestigious art form, and serving as assistant to both of her anthropology professors, a cantankerous human and a giant plumed lizard, with both of whom she is quite frustratedly in love.

=== Grosvenor-Lockhart family ===
Jaeger's chief acquaintances in the city of Anvard are Emma Lockhart, Brigham Grosvenor, and their three daughters, one of whom is biologically male. Brigham, Jaeger's sergeant from army days, comes from a stoic clan of cops and soldiers, but glamorous Emma's clan self-selects for theatricality and feminine gender characteristics in both sexes. Their union, which is held as anathema to both of their clans, has contributed to Brigham's derangement, the handling of which is Jaeger's primary task in Sin-Eater.

Of the three children, the eldest child Rachel's attempt to gain admittance to her mother's clan (and to perhaps do something by herself for once in her life) appeared on McNeil's website for collection in 2008 as Finder volume 9; youngest child Marcie's quest to find a certain lost book if only by writing it is the subject of volume #4; while the story of middle-child Lynne has yet to be written but may complete a hypothetical "three sisters" hardcover McNeil has speculated about releasing.

=== Others ===
- a celebrity virtual reality artist named Magri White;
- Chief Coward's Ascian tribe, including young rebel Jackdaw and a band of his followers helping him explore the city
- Grazie Maugheri, who broadcasts an unlicensed TV program on healthcare as a sexual fetish - a subject she researches quite intimately, at times with Jaeger as subject;
- Brom, Jaeger's closest and oldest male friend seen thus far, who Jaeger won't sleep with and who once beat Jaeger near to death with a chair leg;
- Vary Krishna's professors and fellow students in Xenology/Anthropology and The Art.
- Royal "Roy" Sudamer Ayers, Jaeger's half-brother and possible love interest of Rachel.

== Themes ==
Finder tends to focus on the primarily Western/liberal social norms of and media consumption habits of its urban characters, seen from the viewpoint of their aboriginal neighbors, and on all her characters' strategies, chiefly through travel or artistic endeavor, to escape the often quite intractable limits their societies (and others) place on them.

The series makes allusions to various genres of science fiction and fantasy; apparent influences include Ursula K. Le Guin, Samuel R. Delany, and cyberpunk for thematic content, and a wide range of work for the visual aspects, from old horror comics and simple line cartoons to the science fiction work of Mœbius.

== Awards ==
McNeil and Finder have been nominated for seven Eisner Awards and won in 2009 for Best Digital Comic. Finder has also won one Kimberly Yale Award and three Ignatz awards. Finder: Voice won the 2011 Los Angeles Times Book Prize (Graphic Novel). In 2013, ComicsAlliance ranked Jaeger Ayers as #8 on their list of the "50 Sexiest Male Characters in Comics".

== Publication ==
McNeil first self-published the series through their Lightspeed Press. They began the series in the customary comics format of 24-page magazine/pamphlets, which they soon began collecting on a roughly annual basis in trade paperback editions containing extensive footnotes explaining particulars of the story and of the richly detailed world the characters are moving through.

In 2005, prompted both by low profits on the single-issues and by the format's implicit limitations on story pacing, McNeil ended the pamphlet format of the series with issue #38, and moved regular publication of the story onto their website, with two fresh pages a week appearing free on her website, formerly called www.lightspeedpress.com. The solidly profitable trade-paperback collections continued to appear annually in time for the summer convention season, although in 2007, Finder Book 1, a hardcover collection of the first two volumes, was issued as that year's book, and Volume 9's release pushed ahead to summer 2008.

With a few additions, the volumes have presented the single issues (and then the webcomic) in their original order of production, except for issue #22 (included with vols 1 & 2 in the hardcover "Book 1"), issue #30 (batched with issue #38 (and its online continuation) in Volume 8); and the two issues of McNeil's connecting side project Mystery Date which, with issue #31, form the bulk of Finder Volume 6. The collections have included short stories such as "Counting Coup" or "The Model's Artist" and "Brief Wake" while rare shorts such as "Free Trade" have appeared on the website.

In 2010, McNeil made a publishing deal with Dark Horse Comics. Finder Library Volume One, which is a reprint of the first three stories, was released under Dark Horse in 2011, along with Finder Library Volume Two later that year. Dark Horse also individually published the arcs Voice, Third World, and Talisman; Talisman also has a limited-edition hardcover version that is signed by McNeil. These arcs, along with the two omnibus collections, are also available in digital versions.

=== Volumes ===
1. Part 1 and
2. Part 2 of Sin Eater. Introducing Jaeger, the city of Anvard, and the Grosvenor-Lockhart family. Emma and her three daughters. All are terrified their father will someday get out of prison. What Jaeger can't tell them: he already is. (issues 1-7 and 8-14. volumes available separately in trade paperback (ISBN 0-9673691-0-X and ISBN 0-9673691-1-8) or collected as "Finder Book One" in digest-sized hardcover (hardcover includes expanded version of otherwise-uncollected issue 22) (ISBN 978-09673691-9-8).
3. King of the Cats. Jaeger plays messenger between a disapproving tribe of his own people and a clan of warlike lion-women as they strive to make peace while stuck in the nightmare territory of their shared enemy, the Finder-verse version of Disneyland. (issues 15-18. Paperback - ISBN 0-9673691-2-6)
4. Talisman. Emma's young daughter Marcie, "the kid with the book", grows to adulthood in three chapters. (issues 19-21. ISBN 0-9673691-3-4)
5. Dream Sequence. The series timeline leaps forward. A hapless Internet celebrity, his mind the mainframe for his own wildly popular virtual reality environment, finds a monster inside it that's eating the guests: a monster who resembles Jaeger. (issues 23-29. ISBN 0-9673691-4-2)
6. Mystery Date. Vary Krishna is majoring in prostitution, but minoring in anthropology with a crush on the world's crabbiest professor. Jaeger has a cameo. (collecting Mystery Date issues 1&2, Finder issue 31, add'l material. ISBN 0-9673691-5-0)
7. The Rescuers. There's a kidnapping at the manor house. Jaeger knows who did it but that's just not going to help. (issues 32-37. ISBN 0-9673691-6-9)
8. Five Crazy Women. Jaeger returns to town and gets entangled with various women. Introducing Grazie Maugeri. Cameo by Grosvenor-Lockhart family. (issues 30 & 38 with web serialized material. ISBN 0-9673691-7-7)
9. Voice. Rachel Grosvenor struggles with claiming her birthright, clan membership. (serialized on McNeil's website in rough form, completed in November 2008; published by Dark Horse in March 2011. ISBN 978-1-59582-651-0)
10. Third World. (serialized in Dark Horse Presents Volume 2 #1 - 2, 4 - 7, 10 - 18, 20-21. Collected in Finder: Third World (1st full-color Finder graphic novel), published by Dark Horse in September 2014. ISBN 978-1616554675)
11. Chase the Lady (serialized in Dark Horse Presents Volume 3 #15 - 20, 22 - 25, 27, 29 - 31 & 33. Collected in Finder: Chase the Lady (full-color), published by Dark Horse in May 2021. ISBN 978-1506705439)
- The Finder Library Vol. 1 (issues 1-22, ISBN 978-1-59582-652-7)
- The Finder Library Vol. 2 (issues 23-38, ISBN 978-1-59582-653-4)
