= Raven Rise =

2008 novel by D.J. MacHale

- Book cover
- Author: D.J. MacHale
- Cover artist: Dawn Austin
- Language: English
- Series: Pendragon
- Genre: Fantasy novel
- Published: May 20, 2008 Simon & Schuster
- Publication place: United States
- Media type: Print (Hardback)
- Pages: 544
- ISBN: 978-1-4169-1418-1
- OCLC: 190872371
- LC Class: PZ7.M177535 Rav 2008
- Preceded by: The Pilgrims of Rayne
- Followed by: The Soldiers of Halla

Raven Rise is the ninth book in The Pendragon Adventure by D.J. MacHale. It was published on May 20, 2008.

== Plot ==
The book begins with separate narratives focusing on Patrick Mac and Alder, the Travelers of Third Earth and Denduron respectively. It follows the changes in their home territories and their realization that they are without Bobby Pendragon. On Denduron, the Bedoowan and Milago tribe are using the explosive tak that Bobby unearthed with a dygo from Zadaa to start a war with a neighboring tribe, the Lowsee tribe. On Third Earth, the once Utopian planet has morphed into a waste world. Bobby Pendragon, meanwhile, has been living comfortably on Ibara, the island community located on Veelox. Pendragon's own description states that he has been a contributor and leader of the rebuilding of Ibara, which was destroyed in the previous book by Saint Dane's Dimond Alpha Digital Organization D.A.D.O.army. Days after an unsettling conversation with Saint Dane, Pendragon encounters a drifting skimmer bearing a dying passenger on board (this passenger being Loque, one of the Jakills from The Pilgrims of Rayne who amazingly survived having a large amount of broken glass fall on him and slaving underneath Saint Dane while trying to dig up the flume in Rubic City along with the other Flighters). After hearing Loque's story, Bobby assumes that Saint Dane is after the flume and decides to prevent the flume from being reopened. He fails, and later discovers that Nevva Winter, Saint Dane's ally, has been living on Ibara disguised as Tribune Genj's daughter, Telleo, whom she killed months before. Hearing from her that Denduron is in danger, Bobby reluctantly sets out to rescue it.

Emerging onto Denduron, Pendragon is nearly killed by a quig, later to be healed by Alder, whom he rescues from prison. Later, after failing to reseal the newly opened tak mine, the two of them realize that the territory is lost; therefore they travel to Second Earth to battle Saint Dane.

On First Earth (1937) Mark and Courtney find that they have failed to prevent Mark's inventions from altering Earth's history. Mark is then black-mailed into giving up his Traveler ring to Nevva. They then head to the flume only to be intercepted by Patrick who came to First Earth in search of Bobby after realizing he couldn't save Third Earth alone. Mark and Courtney then return to Second Earth with Patrick in tow. Upon arriving they find that many people are worshiping a new cult, Ravinia, and both flumes have been revealed by Alexander Naymeer who is the leader of Ravinia and the "new" traveler of Second Earth as Bobby has quit. He is using the ring Nevva took from Mark. The goal of Ravinia is to reward the people who contribute to society, while punishing those who do not. Mark, Courtney, and Patrick head to the other flume to get off of Second Earth only to be intercepted by Naymeer. A chase ensues and Patrick narrowly gets away but not before being shot. Mark and Courtney are captured and brought to Naymeer's home which happens to be on top of one of the flumes, in the Sherwood house.

A mortally wounded Patrick arrives on Denduron just as Alder and Bobby are about to leave. They heal him and send him back to Third Earth to find out what a possible Second Earth turning point could be. They then head to Second Earth to find Mark and Courtney. Bobby comes out in the flume below Naymeer's house. Just before Bobby arrives, Naymeer tells Mark and Courtney that the flumes and Traveler rings are made of dark matter. Bobby, Alder, Mark, and Courtney all talk with Naymeer who tells them he can't be stopped. They disagree and escape to Courtney's family's boat where they all decide that a vote to nominate Ravinia as "spiritual advisor" to the entire world is the turning point of Second Earth. Courtney's parents then show up with the cops. Another chase ensues and Mark and Courtney are captured but Bobby and Alder escape and take refuge with the main protester of Ravinia, Haig Gastigian.

Patrick, on Third Earth, learns that the destruction there has begun with a mostly forgotten event known as the Bronx Massacre. He is killed while trying to convey word of this, but succeeds in telling Bobby about the event by sending him a message through his ring. Bobby and Alder witness what they think is the Bronx Massacre when Naymeer sends 12 people, including Mark and Courtney, into the flume to an unknown destination. Bobby and Alder later hear from Haig Gastigian, that he is holding a rally of 70,000 people in Yankee Stadium. At the rally the UN's vote is revealed to favor Ravinia, whereupon the 70,000 protesters gathered in Yankee Stadium are pulled into a giant flume which Naymeer creates, causing the true Bronx Massacre. Alder tries to stop him, but is killed in the process. Bobby is brought to a helicopter and flown above the stadium to witness everyone's deaths. It is revealed that Haig Gastigian was really Nevva who lured all the people to the stadium. Realizing this, Bobby throws Naymeer into the flume. At this, Saint Dane claims victory because Bobby had stooped to his level and failed his last test. Naymeer, falling into the flume, causes a beam of light to strike the helicopter. It spins out of control and falls into the flume. Saint Dane and Nevva escape and later tell the Conclave of Ravinia, the head of Ravinia, that Naymeer is dead but that Nevva is trained to take his place.

Bobby then finds himself in space, looking down at the flumes, and watches them explode. He wakes up in the middle of an oblivious landscape, where he is confronted by his Uncle Press and the other nine travelers of his generation, both dead and alive. Uncle Press says that now is the right time to kill Saint Dane, since he believes that he has won. He also says that it is time for the current Travelers to learn the truth about themselves. The Travelers decide to finish the fight with Saint Dane, once and for all.

== Cover art unveiling ==
The cover art was hyped on the official site by a complete redesign of the site, and a countdown to December 17, 2007, when the cover would be released.

== Reception ==
The book reached the #2 spot in numerous categories on Amazon.com.
