= Escapist fiction =

Genre of fiction

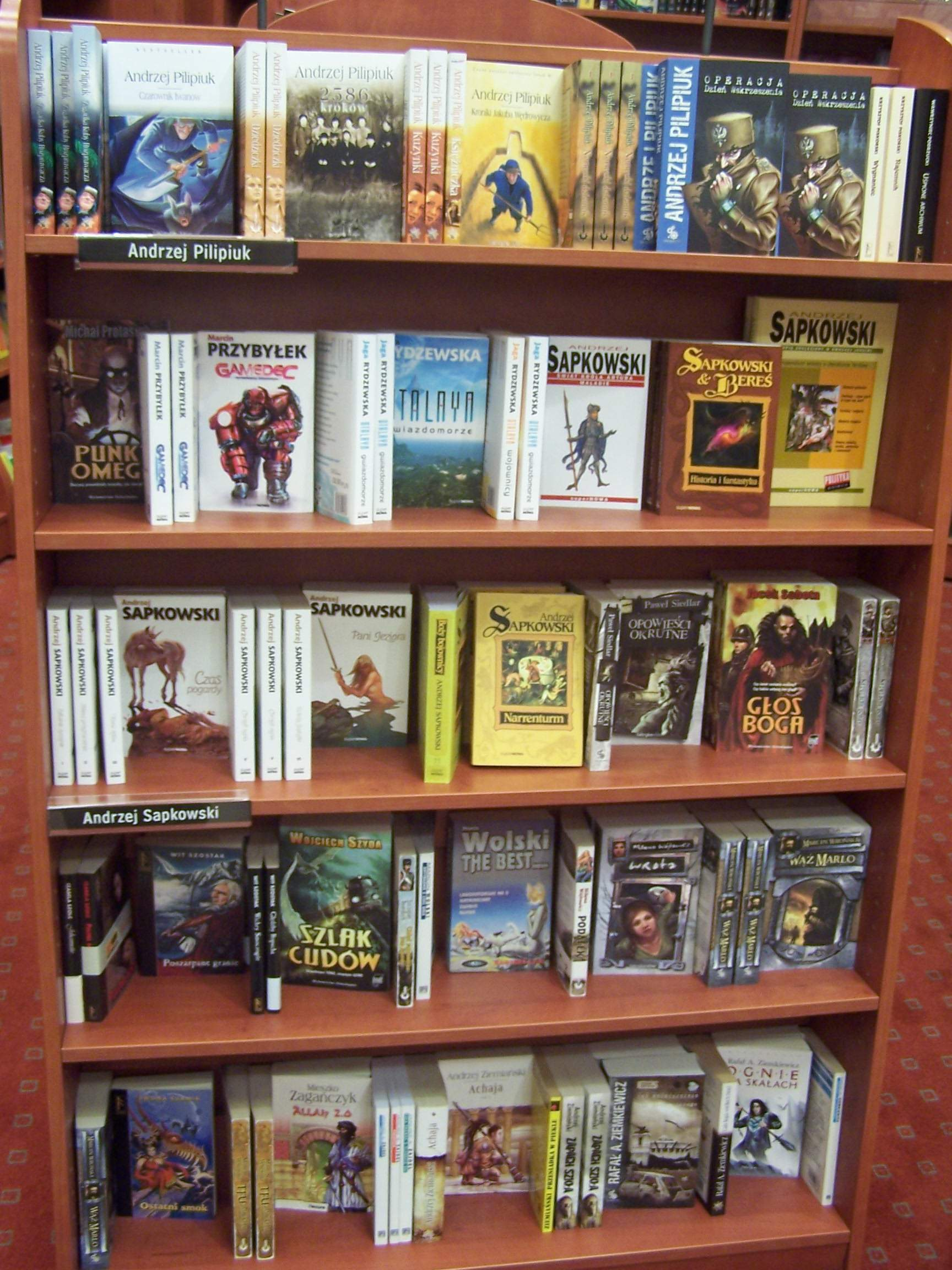
Bookstores will typically shelve science fiction and fantasy books separately from the general or literary fiction section. Katowice, Poland.

Escapist fiction, also known as escape fiction, escapist literature, or simply escapism, is fiction that provides escapism by immersing readers in a "new world" created by the author. The genre aims to compensate for a real world the reader perceives as arbitrary and unpredictable compared to the clear rules of the constructed "new world". Typically, an author of escapist fiction offers structure, rationality and resolution to real world problems throughout their medium. The genre facilitates mentalisation; that is, escapist fiction encourages psychological engagement from the reader. Escapist fiction is often contrasted with realism, which confronts the reader with the harsh reality of war, disease, family dysfunction, crime, foreclosure, death, etc. It encompasses a number of different genres within it; any fiction that immerses the reader into a world different from their own is fundamentally escapist fiction. Escapist literature aims to give readers imaginative entertainment rather than to address contemporary issues and provoke serious and critical thoughts.

Historically, the arts, and literature in particular, have been acknowledged for its ability to distract readers from the hardships of reality. During the Great Depression, readers turned to escapist fiction as it provided them a mental escape from the bleakness of the economy during that period of time. Fiction books and novels were an affordable and easy means for readers to escape into another world, so people used escapist fiction to provide them with a temporary psychological escape from the realities of their world.

Labelling a work "escapist fiction" can be to minimise it. Those who defend works described as escapist either assert that they are not escapist—for example, that a science fiction novel's satiric aspects address real life—or defend the notion of "escape" as such, not "escapism".

Escapist fiction does not have a formal literary definition and can variously be used as a synonym for genre fiction, commercial fiction, popular fiction, or formula fiction. Genres that can function as escapist fiction include:

- Bodice rippers/Romance novels
- Fantasy fiction
- Horror fiction
- Pulp fiction
- Science fiction, Utopian and dystopian fiction
- Thrillers, Detective novels, and Spy novels
- Action/Adventure fiction
- Superhero films
- Supernatural fiction
- Soap Opera
- Saturday Morning Cartoons
- Puppet Show
- Dinner theatre
- Midnight Movie
- Farce

== Characteristics ==
The concept of individuals using different forms of medium, such as fiction, to "escape" from the limitations and dissatisfaction of everyday life is known as "escapist fiction". It is because of this that some people may argue that most fiction and the act of reading itself, is a pursuit of escapism.

J. R. R. Tolkien, a linguistic scholar, is one of the essential figures in escapist fiction. He is the author of The Lord of the Rings, which is a classic example of escapist fiction. He wrote it to illustrate the meaning of his essay "On Fairy-Stories". He admitted that fairy stories were something of an escape, he believed people should be provided an escape from the world of factories, machine guns and bombs. Though fairy-stories are by no means the only medium of escape, they are one of the more obvious and (to some) outrageous forms of "escapist" literature. The popular titles such as the Harry Potter series by written by J. K. Rowling, The Chronicles of Narnia by C. S. Lewis, Suzanne Collins' The Hunger Games, and Tolkien's The Lord of the Rings, are examples of escapist fiction. Each of these novels allow the reader to essentially escape into a fantasy world that is not their own. It can be argued that these novels, and similar novels, add to the understanding that escapist fiction is not a negative thing stating that literary fiction critics misunderstood the term as denial or evasion of real life issues instead of layered and complex way of looking at the world and that escapism and realism are not mutually exclusive.

These novels can provide readers with a moral compass or teach them lessons, they can be interpreted as a medium to represent and overcome an individual's personal fears, shortcomings, and, at times the need for this "escape". The secondary world, or fantastical one, is something that closely mirrors the primary one and would not be successful or satisfying if readers could not imagine it as realistic and relatable. Escapist fiction employs narrative strategies that engage and immerse readers whilst also distancing reader from their world and society. Escapist fiction seeks to engage readers in reflective and inquisitive processes encouraging readers to question and challenge their own cultural and social realities. A key element in escapist fiction is using techniques that encourage readers to enter into a new world whilst dually constructing a position of critical engagement. That is, a position whereby readers are encouraged to think critically and reflect upon contemporary social ideologies; identity, agency, the environment, social constructs, politics etc.

== Context and origin ==
During the Great Depression in the 1930s, people began to turn to escapist fiction because it provided readers with a mental escape from the alarming rates of unemployment and the overall decline of the economy during that period of time. Despite the economic devastation of the Great Depression during this period of time people were granted the opportunity to experience leisure time. Popular culture, and the entertainment and amusement it provided may be considered crucial in maintaining the public's well being during the harsh reality of the period. Reading genres such as escapist fiction during this period allowed people to escape from the uncertainties, anxieties and loss of self-esteem resulting from the Great Depression period. Popular culture, in particular escapist fiction as a genre, thrived and evolved during the 1930s unlike other industries. Owing to the unemployment during the depression, people had more free time and sought-after ways to fill their time and escape the bleak reality they faced. Most popular culture and fiction created during the period of 1929 to 1941 did not deal with or contain any explicit references to the harsh realities of the Great Depression as a topic. This further supports this idea that in this context popular culture and fiction were largely utilised as a vehicle to escape the deprived and alienated living conditions characteristic of the period. In the 1950s and 1960s people tended to view the topic of escapism through a socio-political perspective, analysing how the dysfunctions of society trigger peoples need for escape. Reading fiction during the Great Depression was popular, readers searching for escapist literature had a vast array of materials to choose from, such as "pulps", comic strips, comic books, fiction novels, etc.

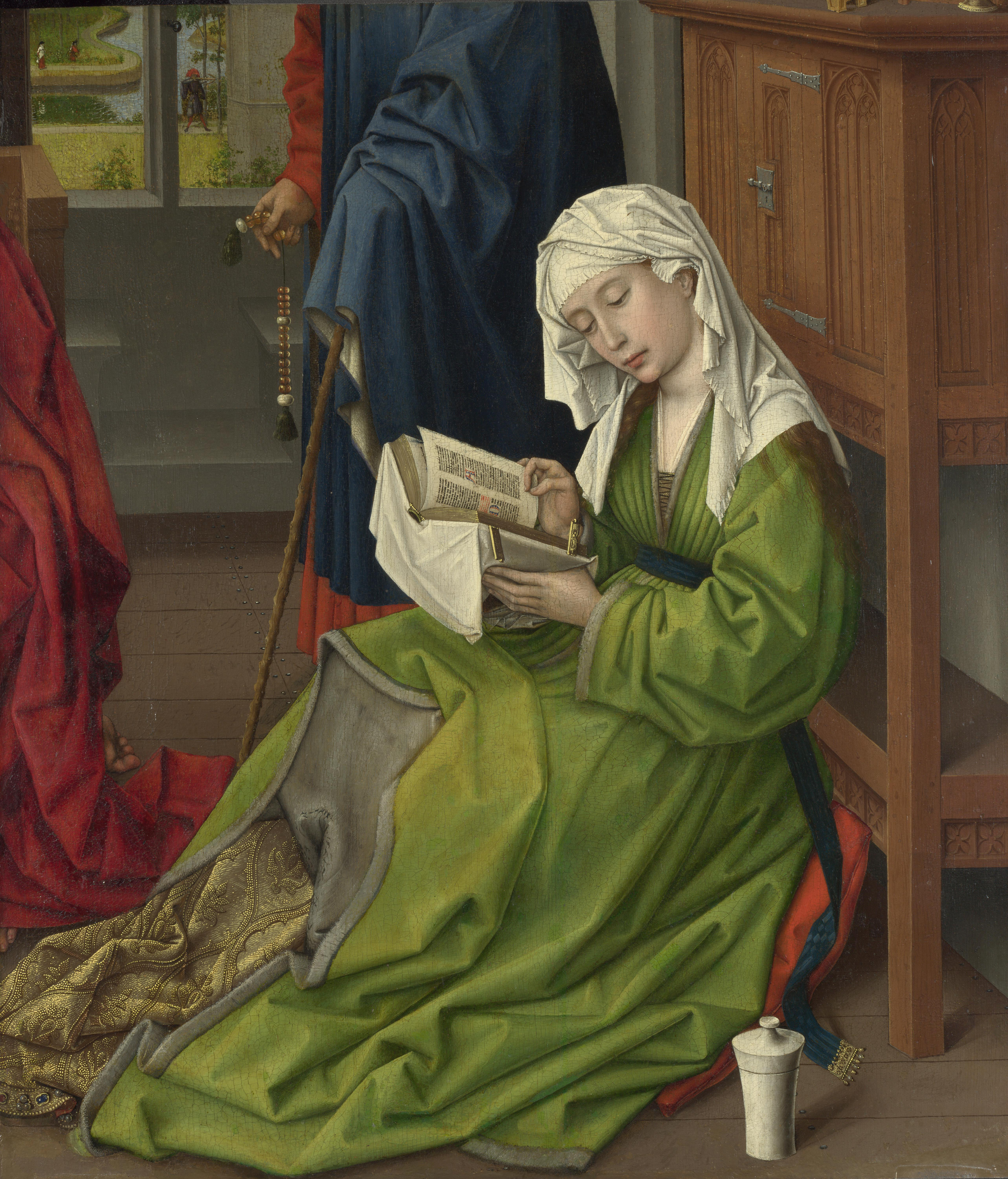
Historically reading has been a way to "escape" from the harshness of reality

The designation of escape in literature, known as escapist fiction, dates back to the 1930s. The word "escapism" was born in the 1930s and grew rapidly in usage. In the 1940s and the 1950s the term escapism in terms of literature was largely criticised. In the 1960s and 1970s the concept of "escape" in literature emerged as a mode of dealing with imperfect existence where the reader could temporarily escape reality. The conceptual idea and intention of escapist literature is to erase difference and to free readers of the intricacies and responsibilities of historical specificity.

== Ideology ==
Fantasy literature is escapist in nature, creating another world where the reader and protagonist escape their familiar surroundings and enter into a different and new environment. Escapist fiction creates these alternate, fantasy worlds to escape the immediate socio-political and economic settings of the real world. The secondary world created in works of escapist fiction is something that closely mirrors the primary one. The secondary world is also a way of understanding and coping with the things we want to escape from in our primary world. This secondary world would not be successful if readers did not see it as plausible, real, and relating to their own world. Escapist fiction, in particular fantasy fiction, does allow a departure from our world in that it frees itself from the restraints of normality and everyday life. Much of escapist fiction is allegorical and utilises features of worldliness in a variety of ways in order to comment on modern life. Escapist fiction often seeks to examine a deeper element of human existence and purpose. Escapist literature tends to confront contemporary issues, in particular moral and political matters, through a moral journey the reader undertakes where they can learn important life lessons in the fictional world. Escapist fiction can provide readers with a rich literature that deals with universal issues of humanity, especially the matters of childhood experience and adolescence. Escapist fiction authors construct alternate worlds in order to comment on our world implicitly through the differences and explicitly in the similarities. The fundamental purpose of escapist fiction is to comment on the real world and explore the moral, social, political and philosophical dilemmas that exist within it. Through confronting contemporary issues, escapist fiction authors aim to shift conventional perspectives and reveal a moral insight. As a genre of fiction that requires a substantial level of immersion into the world of the text, escapist fiction has the potential to greatly influence readers.

== Scholarship and criticism ==
There are many negative connotations attached to escapist fiction. Some literary critics and academics have classified escapist fiction and genres of science-fiction, thriller, mystery, romance and fantasy, as sub-literary and unworthy of being regarded as true literature. Early critics complained that escapist fiction as a literary genre misleads readers in terms of the harsh truths of reality. Early entertainment and literature tended to view escapist fiction as a lower-class phenomenon. Assuming that the alienation, deprivation and restriction of lower-class life caused a desire to escape in these "underprivileged" individuals. These critics deem escapist fiction to be shallow and superficial, with its worth being degraded to simply a source of entertainment. Some literary critics have deemed escapist fiction as frivolous and frequently dismiss it as a literary genre. These people argue that escapist fiction has little value for adolescent socialisation.

On the other hand, some literary critics hold escapist fiction in high regard, expressing it as a genre possessing a thematic depth and ideological complexity that is both appealing to readers and influential. These people argue against the negative connotations associated with escapist fiction. They argue that through encouraging readers to "escape" escapist fiction has the ability to position its readers to be perceptive to didactic and potentially formative ideological assumptions. Those who advocate for escapist fiction as a genre believe it holds a formative value for adolescents as they mature and can therefore offer similar socialising value to readers. For a long time creators and consumers of escapist fiction have been placed (and still are placed) in a position of inferiority, therefore, escapist fiction is an excluded genre from recognition and scholarship. The ideological views presented in escapist fiction are often implicit, that is, representations throughout escapist literature are informed and structured according to the accepted cultural and societal constructions.

== Examples ==
Most genres that belong under the title of popular fiction are considered to be escapist literature, including, romance novels, mystery novels, fantasy novels, horror fiction, science fiction, pulp fiction, thrillers. Popular fiction authors, such as, Jilly Cooper, Agatha Christie, Enid Blyton, Barbara Cartland, Stephen King, J. K. Rowling, J. R. R. Tolkien, and Danielle Steel can be categorised as authors of escapist literature.

=== Common characteristics, techniques and features ===
One of the most well-known canonical examples of escapist literature is Tolkien's The Lord of the Rings. This work of escapist fiction describes characters in an entirely new, fictional universe complete with its own history and languages. Tolkien explores the themes of right and wrong, and emphasises the significance of small acts of bravery. These are themes that are prominent in most escapist literature.

Escapist literature aims to create a relatable and believable alternate world, where the inhabitants struggle with dilemmas that the reader may encounter. Escapist fiction contains elements of reality, self-improvement and deep-seated truths, and can explore moral and ethical themes within an entertaining medium. There is an intrinsic need for escape that is embedded within humans to maintain sanity, escapist literature allows a window for readers to view historical and instinctual lessons. Escapist fiction can be a representation for how things ought to be in the world, encouraging readers to understand underlying problems and challenges of the real world within the context of an alternate world.

As a multifaceted literary from containing several genres, escapist fiction contains thematic depth and complex ideologies that seek to persuade the reader to reconsider their views of the world. Escapist fiction uses techniques that seek to encourage readers engagement and fulfilment of "escape" through the use of closely focalised narration. The use of present tense narration is also prevalent in escapist fiction as it invites readers to engage directly with character, story and setting. Narration is a significant feature of escapist fiction as it is imperative for maximum engagement, as such, the displacement of readers into another world affects ideological interpellation and interpretations.

== See also ==
- Escapism
- Formula fiction
- Genre fiction
- Pulp magazines
- Literature
- Fiction
- Metafiction
