= The Merchant of Death =

Book by D.J. MacHale

- Author: D. J. MacHale
- Cover artist: Victor Lee, Aladdin Fantasy
- Language: English
- Series: Pendragon
- Genre: Fantasy novel
- Publisher: Aladdin
- Publication date: September 1, 2002
- Publication place: United States
- Media type: Print (paperback and hardback)
- Pages: 372 pp (first edition, paperback)
- ISBN: 0-7434-3731-4 (first edition, paperback)
- OCLC: 50612343
- LC Class: PZ7.M177535 Me 2002
- Followed by: The Lost City of Faar

The Merchant of Death is the first book in the Pendragon series by D. J. MacHale. It follows the adventures of Bobby Pendragon as he travels to Denduron.

== Plot introduction ==
The story takes place in a "territory" (universe separate from the "Second Earth" universe of the story, there are ten territories in all) called Denduron. Denduron has three suns, to the east, the north and the south, but otherwise has most of the same characteristics as Earth. The story is based around two tribes: the Milago and the Bedoowan. The Milago are treated very poorly by the Bedoowan, who live in luxury; they live in little huts without running water or even outhouses and have to mine for a valuable stone called glaze every hour of the day to meet the demands of Kagan, the queen of the Bedoowan. If the Milago do not meet the required supply of glaze which changes each day, one of them is killed by being pushed into an abandoned mine shaft. This process is used by a weight system that weighs the person in glaze. The Bedoowan have more advanced tools and technologies such as running water, stoves and artificial light.

== Plot ==
The story starts with Bobby Pendragon, a normal fourteen-year-old boy, preparing to leave his home to play in the state basketball semi-finals, but before he leaves, Courtney Chetwynde, a popular girl at his school, comes to his house and admits her feelings toward him. While they are kissing Bobby's Uncle Press arrives and tells Bobby some people need their help and to come with him.

They drive on a motorcycle to a boarded-up subway station in the Bronx. Press leaves the motorcycle outside with the keys in ignition, this surprises Bobby but when he asks, Press says they do not need it anymore. They head into the abandoned subway, where they meet the main villain, Saint Dane, whose goal is to destroy the barriers between the ten territories of Halla; every territory, person, and living thing. Saint Dane controls a homeless man to jump in front of a subway train, and says this is to "Give the boy a taste of what he's in for,". He attacks Uncle Press and Bobby. Then Uncle Press tells Bobby to go to a door with a star on it and yell Denduron.

When Bobby and Press arrive in Denduron, they change their clothing to fit the local customs, and find a bobsled, along with two spears and a dog whistle, left by an acolyte (a person native to a territory who aides the Travelers by leaving items such as clothing and means for transportation). Bobby and Press start their descent from the mountain, and they are attacked by twelve quigs (animals Saint Dane uses to patrol the gates of the flumes; the appearance of quigs vary among the territories). They manage to live through the situation by using the dog whistle and the spears, but the sled crashes, and Press is kidnapped by Bedoowan knights. Bobby is rescued by a Traveler warrior named Osa, a wise woman whose daughter, Loor, is disgusted by him for most of the book. They are acquainted with Alder, a Bedoowen knight who is the Traveler from Denduron in disguise. Bobby, Alder and Loor try to rescue Press from the Bedoowan castle, armed with a backpack full of tools brought from Bobby's home, Second Earth, to make the job of rescuing Uncle Press easier, despite the warning Press gave Bobby that territories are not to be mixed (through items or otherwise). During this time, Bobby realizes that the Bedoowan live a luxurious and lazy life, as they listen to music, relax on pillows, and eat, attended by the pallid, taciturn Novans. Also, technologically speaking, the Bedoowan are years ahead of the Milago with inventions and devices including dumbwaiters, running water, and artificial light. After rescuing Press, Bobby learns that bringing items from Second Earth turns out to be a mistake. While Bobby was sleeping in a mine ventilation shaft before the rescue attempt, a homely merchant of the Milago by the name of Figgis had stolen a flashlight from Bobby's bag. When Bobby, Loor, Alder, and the newly rescued Press return to the Milago village, they discover that Figgis, the native merchant, had been selling tak, an unstable explosive that is to be used as a weapon to free themselves from Bedoowan rule. The final component to build a weapon that will destroy the Bedoowan (and probably all of the Milago village, though the Milago are willing to take that risk) is the battery and the switch from the flashlight, which Bobby accidentally supplied. Their plan was to present the tak bomb to the Bedoowan during the transfer ceremony (where the Bedoowan receive the glaze), disguised as a rather large mine cart of glaze, and destroy the remaining Bedoowan with smaller amounts of tak.

Bobby, Loor, Alder, and Press manage to stop the chief miner Rellin from setting the bomb off, and all the Bedoowan and the Novans evacuate to a field, where the battle between the Milago and the Bedoowan is to take place. Before this, though, Bobby and Loor are faced with the task of getting rid of the bomb. After waking up some of the quigs, which were in a pen off to the side of the stadium in which they were presenting the glaze ( and tak), and having Loor open the pen door, the quigs rush out and slaughter some of the men there. Right before Relin set the bomb Uncle Press nails a spear into his arm. Rellin lies there struggling. Uncle Press picks up the bomb to disarm it and then he realizes that the quigs were getting the upper hand. He took desperate measures and threw the switch with some tak into the quig's mouth. It left the quig in little bits. Afterwards, Bobby and Loor use water to liquidate it and spread it across the field. The bomb is gone except for one small ball, which Bobby slips into his pocket. At this point, Figgis the merchant lures Bobby and Loor into the mines, where they find an immense supply of tak. They soon realize that Figgis is really Saint Dane. The real Figgis died when one of his own traps backfired. Disguised as Figgis, Saint Dane sold the tak to the Milago, urging them to rebel against the Bedoowan. At the same time, Saint Dane has disguised himself as Mallos, Queen Kagan's chief adviser, and had turned Bedoowan minds further against their neighbors. The traps that the real Figgis set trap Bobby and Loor with Saint Dane in the mine. Seeing it is the only way out, Bobby throws his small ball of tak at the large supply, which ignites the tak and will cause all of it to explode underground. Saint Dane escapes the impending destruction by using the flume in the mine to go to the territory of Cloral. By sending a high speed wave of water and a giant shark back through the flume, Bobby can't follow. To make matters worse for Bobby, the water knocked Loor against the wall of the cavern knocking her unconscious. Bobby just manages to escape the explosion by pushing a mine cart that held the unconscious Loor into the ocean through a ventilation shaft. When Bobby swims back to the shore and surveys the damage, they find that although the explosion had effected much destruction, most of the people are still alive, including Uncle Press and Alder. The castle, symbolic of Bedoowan rule over the Milago, falls into the ocean because of the force of the explosion, most of the Milago huts are destroyed, and the glaze mines are forever closed. Thus, the two tribes can use their best strengths to rebuild and improve each other's lives (Milago-farming and building and Bedoowan-engineering and chemistry).

Bobby travels back to Second Earth with Uncle Press, hoping to find his family and carry on with his former life. Unfortunately, he soon learns that his house and family have disappeared, leaving not even a trace to show that Bobby had once lived there, so he decides to travel to Cloral and continue his mission to avert Saint Dane's evil mission. We, as the reader are privy to Saint Dane and Bobby's struggle against each other. These two people are fighting for Halla, the universe and whether or not it should be kept stable or be destroyed.

While all this is going on for Bobby, his friends Courtney Chetwynde and Mark Dimond are on the receiving end of his Traveler journals, through a Traveler ring that Osa gave Mark in the middle of one night. Following the advice of Osa, Bobby and Loor are using their spare time to write logs of their journeys, which are sent to their respective home territories via the Traveler rings. These rings are made of the same stone which lines the flume; when the desired territory is named, the ring becomes a minuscule version of the flume, through which the journals are dropped.

Although initially reluctant to believe the astonishing story, Mark and Courtney accept it in time. They soon have no choice; Bobby's family, his home, and all record of his existence have vanished without a trace. Only memory remains.

When Bobby returns, he too must face this difficult fact. As his Uncle Press sets off for the territory of Cloral, Bobby goes with him to fulfill his duties as a Traveler.

== Characters ==
- Robert "Bobby" Pendragon - Bobby is a 14-year-old boy from the territory of second earth. The main character of the series and the Lead Traveler. He was taken from his old life on his home by his eccentric uncle and sent into a strange new world called Denduron. He works to outsmart Saint Dane throughout and saves the territory
- Saint Dane - The villain of the story, an evil Traveler capable of shape-shifting. His goal is to bring chaos to Halla and re-build it for himself. Halla is everything that separates good from evil. It is very common of Saint Dane to make himself in an important position so he can create war and chaos on the inside feeding information and causing wars in all the territories.
- Press Tilton - Bobby's uncle. A very experienced Traveler, who helps Bobby learn as he becomes one. He is one of the older generation of Travelers, so he is able to answer most of Bobby's questions. Later, he told Bobby that he was not his real, blood-related uncle. All the Milago look up to him and he will always fight for the good of things.
- Mark Dimond - Bobby's best friend from Second Earth; described as a science nerd, long black hair that "always looks as if it should have been washed yesterday", and extremely intelligent. He is the one Bobby sends all his records to while he is in other territories. He teams up with Courtney to help their friend.
- Courtney Chetwynde - Another of Bobby's buddies from Earth and his love life; described as doing pretty well academically with the exception of math, and is amazing at sports. She is Bobby's best friend. She teams up with Mark Dimond.
- Loor - The traveler from Zadaa. She is described as an extremely attractive warrior. Loor travels to Denduron with her adoptive mother Osa to help stop Saint Dane. She shuns Bobby because of her mother's death, but later makes up with him. She is very mean to Bobby but when he does a heroic act at the end, Bobby is forgiven.
- Osa - Loor's adoptive mother, who is also extremely attractive and a warrior. She is the one to tell Bobby to send the letters to his friends back on Second Earth.
- Alder - The Traveler from Denduron. Although he is a trained Bedoowan knight, he is concerned about the Milago and helps the rest of the Travelers whenever he can. He is described as being very clumsy and not very good looking.
- Kagan - The queen of the Bedoowan. It was the fault of Kagan that the Milago have to live so poorly, even though she was being influenced by Saint Dane. She is described that she has an annoyingly high voice and is extremely obese with eating. She was originally thought of as a man by Bobby because of her name. She likes it when Milago are killed by quigs in the arena.
- Rellin - The leader of the Milago miners, and leader of their revolution.
- Mallos - The adviser to Queen Kagan. He is Saint Dane in disguise.
- Figgis - A mysterious merchant, later revealed to also be Saint Dane. The real Figgis died years ago according to Saint Dane. He is sneaky and always trying to sell any item he has. Figgis found this explosive called tak down in the mines and was trying to protect it with traps but the traps backfired, and he dies instead.

== Reception ==
Publishers Weekly also reviewed the audiobook narrated by William Dufris. They highlighted how Dufris "us[es] his upbeat delivery and believable teen rhythms to keep listeners enthralled", concluding that "fans of the books will want to hear Dufris's gripping interpretation" and "newcomers will quickly get hooked".

Booklist also reviewed the graphic novel.

== Graphic novel ==
A The Merchant of Death illustrated by Carla Speed McNeil was released on May 20, 2008, the same day as Raven Rise.
