= The Reality Bug =

Book by D.J. MacHale

- First edition cover
- Author: D. J. MacHale
- Cover artist: Victor Lee
- Language: English
- Series: Pendragon
- Genre: Fantasy novel
- Publisher: Aladdin
- Publication date: September 1, 2003
- Publication place: United States
- Media type: Print (Paperback & Hardback)
- Pages: 384 pp (first edition, paperback)
- ISBN: 0-7434-3734-9 (first edition, paperback)
- Preceded by: The Never War
- Followed by: Black Water

The Reality Bug is the fourth book in the Pendragon series by D. J. MacHale.

== Plot ==
Bobby arrives on the territory of Veelox with Gunny, where they land in the dark room outside the Veelox flume. Bobby and Gunny briefly encounter Saint Dane before he escapes to the territory of Eelong. Bobby and Gunny decide to split up: Gunny will immediately go to Eelong and report back later with news while Bobby stays on Veelox to try and unravel Saint Dane's plan.

Bobby meets Aja Killian, the traveler from Veelox, and discovers a planet and society very similar to Second Earth. The major difference is that it is nearly deserted: Aja explains that Lifelight, a virtual reality program that allows people to live in their own perfect fantasies, has drawn nearly everyone on Veelox out of living in the real world and into large Lifelight pyramids housing thousands of "jump" simulators. The jumps are monitored by "phaders", who monitor the Lifelight program the jumpers' fantasies, and "vedders", who act as caretakers for the jumpers' physical bodies. Aja works at the Lifelight pyramid in Rubic City as a senior phader.

Bobby experiences his own fantasy "jump": he meets his family, plays with his dog, Marley, and stars in a basketball game for his hometown high school team. Aja then explains that nearly everyone has simply abandoned real life to live in their perfect fantasy. Cities are falling into decay, no food is being grown, and the territory is slowly dying. Aja then reveals her plan to stop Lifelight: a "Reality Bug" virus designed to make the fantasies less-than-perfect and coax people to reenter the real world.

After testing the Reality Bug on Bobby's jump, Bobby and Aja learn through a pre-recorded hologram that Saint Dane had altered the code of Aja's virus, bringing the jumpers' worst fears into their fantasies- and making the effects of pain and death in Lifelight real outside of it. Alex, a phader monitoring their jump, is killed by a quig that appears in Bobby's fantasy, and Bobby and Aja must make a dangerous escape from Lifelight. Upon returning to reality, they find Alex dead in his chair and Bobby's injuries appearing as scars or headaches, confirming Saint Dane's manipulation of the code. With thousands of jumps across the territory going awry, Aja suspends the grid to put all active jumps on 'pause'.

Bobby and Aja realize that the only way to purge the Reality Bug from Lifelight is to get the origin code from Dr. Zetlin, the founder of Lifelight, who is living in his own fantasy on an independ alpha grid. Not knowing what dangers they may encounter in his fantasy if the Reality Bug reaches it, Bobby travels to the territory of Zadaa and asks Loor, the traveler from Zadaa, to accompany him into the alpha grid.

After accidentally landing in a series of fantasy jumps pulled from Bobby's mind, Aja is able to get them into Zetlin's jump. At the edge of a dreary city, Bobby and Loor find Zetlin residing in a giant rotating structure called the "Barbican". The travellers navigate multiple levels of the tower, including a dense jungle, and underwater racecourse, and a snow-covered landscape before finding Zetlin and convincing him to give up the origin code. However, after Aja enters the origin code back in the pyramid, and the Reality Bug takes the physical form of a black shape-shifting amoeba that chases Bobby, Loor, and Zetlin throughout the tower. Saint Dane had altered the code of Aja's virus again, causing it to fuel itself and grow with the fears of every jumper on Veelox. Eventually, the bug grows too large and powerful, and begins breaking through the fantasy to escape into reality. After escaping the jump, the Reality Bug begins breaking through to the real world, but Zetlin is convinced to shut down the Lifelight program just in time, which starves the virus and eradicates it.

In the days following their success, Loor returns to Zadaa, and Aja and Dr. Zetlin assist with an inquiry into the events leading to Lifelight's shutdown. At a public ceremony to announce the inquiry's findings, Dr. Zetlin thanks Aja publicly for helping save the lives of jumpers all over Veelox and announces his intent to keep Lifelight shut down until he and the directors can determine how Lifelight can fit with reality. However, Dr. Sever, the program's prime director, announces afterward that those discussions will occur with Lifelight in full operation. Everyone on Veelox rushes back into their fantasies, leaving nearly nobody to keep the real world functioning. Dr. Sever reveals herself to Bobby as Saint Dane, who revels in his first victory.

In between Bobby's journals on Second Earth, Mark Dimond and Courtney Chetwynde navigate the challenges of becoming acolytes. Mark follows a glow on his acolyte ring to discover a new flume in the basement of an abandoned property in their neighbourhood, and Courtney is suspended from the junior varsity soccer team after a scrimmage incident against the varsity squad. At the end of the story, Mark accidentally triggers the new flume and summons Saint Dane, who gloats in his victory and leaves a small sack as a 'gift' for Bobby. Just as Saint Dane leaves, Bobby arrives, and they find Gunny's severed hand inside the sack. Bobby chastises Mark and Courtney, telling them "things have changed" since the loss on Veelox and not to activate the flume again, before disappearing to return to Eelong.

== Characters ==
- Robert "Bobby" Pendragon - The traveler from Second Earth and the "Lead Traveler", according to several other travelers. He is trying to unravel Saint Dane's plan on Veelox.
- Saint Dane - a traveler and shape-shifting demon attempting to push critical events on the territories of space and time toward chaos. He is revealed to have tampered with Lifelight and the "Reality Bug" virus intended to disrupt it.
- Aja Killian - the traveler from Veelox, and a senior phader in the city of Rubic City.
- Loor - the traveler from Zadaa.
- Dr. Zetlin - the inventor of Lifelight.
- Mark Dimond - Bobby's best friend on Second Earth, who is seeking to become an acolyte to help Bobby in his journey.
- Courtney Chetwynde - Bobby's friend from Second Earth, who joins Mark in becoming an acolyte.

== See also ==
- Simulated reality
