= The Never War =

Novel by D. J. MacHale

- First edition cover
- Author: D. J. MacHale
- Language: English
- Series: Pendragon
- Genre: Fantasy novel
- Publisher: Aladdin
- Publication date: May 1, 2003
- Publication place: United States
- Media type: Print (Paperback & Hardback)
- Pages: 352 pp (first edition, paperback)
- ISBN: 0-7434-3733-0 (first edition, paperback)
- OCLC: 52143216
- LC Class: MLCS 2006/42146 (P)
- Preceded by: The Lost City of Faar
- Followed by: The Reality Bug

The Never War is a book in the Pendragon series by D.J. MacHale. In this book, the main character, Robert "Bobby" Pendragon follows the antagonist, Saint Dane, to a territory called First Earth, which is essentially Earth in the year 1937.

== Plot summary ==
Bobby Pendragon and Vo Spader, the Traveler from Cloral, arrive on Veelox a few weeks after the death of Bobby's uncle, Press Tilton, only to figure out from Aja Killian, the Traveler from Veelox, that Saint Dane went to First Earth. They flume there (New York City, 1937) to be greeted by bullets from gangsters that Saint Dane has hired. They then met the First Earth Traveler, who saved them from the gangsters. He is a bell captain at the Manhattan Tower Hotel named Vincent Van Dyke, nicknamed "Gunny". Bobby and Spader become employed as bellhops there, and investigate the ties between First Earth's Turning Point, rival crime godfathers Max Rose and Winn Farrow, and the Nazi party.

The critical connection is revealed to be the Hindenburg zeppelin. To understand its significance, Bobby and Gunny visit Third Earth, in the 51st Century. The Traveler of Third Earth, Patrick, accesses a computer that predicts the future in which they save the Hindenburg: industrial spies working for Max would lead to the Nazis developing an atomic bomb and disastrously winning World War Two.

Bobby and Gunny return to First Earth, only to find that Spader and Rose have gone ahead, seeking to stop Winn Farrow from shooting a firework rocket into Hindenburg. Bobby was flown to the LZ-129's launch site by a female aeroplane pilot called Nancy Olsen (Jinx), who has been his friend and client at the hotel. Once parachuting from the aeroplane, Bobby tracks down Max and Spader, who are seconds from departing to meet Max's airship arrival. Bobby accompanies them, and with Third Earth foresight, manages to save the entire entourage's lives. While on Third Earth, the young Traveler learns that Max Rose was destined to die on the same highway, on the same day, after crashing into a motorcycle cop. With Max unconscious and Spader, convinced stopping the Hindenburg will save First Earth, heading for the airfield, Bobby uses Max's car to follow them. Spader, misunderstanding, tries to stop the rocket from launching; Gunny holds him back, but fails. Spader tries to save the Hindenburg on his own, but is stopped by Winn Farrow. Spader begs Bobby to save the Hindenburg. Looking up, Bobby sees the faces of those who will die in the explosion and is reluctant to let them die. Gunny again intervenes, holding him until the rocket launches and the zeppelin burns.

After the whole incident is over, Bobby is upset that Spader's emotions nearly got the better of him which almost lead to the destruction on all three earth territories. Bobby tells Spader to return to Cloral until he learns to control his emotions.

Full of angst over his role in the tragedy, Bobby returns to his home on Second Earth (the 21st-century) for a pause in his Travels. After a week, he receives a call from Gunny, and meets him back at Bobby's old house a few hours later. Gunny arrives in a limousine with an elderly man claiming to know Bobby's great-grandfather (unknowingly referring to Bobby when he was on First Earth), and explains how Uncle Press had died, describing how an accomplice (who the Gangster revealed to be Saint Dane) persuaded Tony, the gangster's partner, into shooting a Tommy Gun into the flume. He states clearly that he never fired a bullet. He then gives Bobby his Traveler ring which the gangster took from him on First Earth. Bobby thanks the gangster, and he and Gunny accompany the gangster down town to the flume. This is where The Reality Bug begins.

== Characters in The Never War ==
- Robert "Bobby" Pendragon - Bobby is the main character of the story and is the Traveler from Second Earth. He goes to First Earth after his victory over Saint Dane on Cloral,
- Vo Spader - The Traveler from Cloral, as well as Bobby's friend and ally. However, his hatred for Saint Dane almost results in a victory for Saint Dane in First Earth.
- Saint Dane - The story's antagonist. A six-half foot-tall demon shapeshifter, he takes the form of quite a few people, including a spy, Max Rose's girlfriend Esther Amaden, and most likely a raven.
- Vincent "Gunny" Van Dyke - The Traveler from First Earth. He is the bell captain of the Manhattan Tower Hotel. This is our first encounter with Gunny. He is the reason that First Earth was saved, by holding back Bobby when he tried to kick over the rocket. Gunny got his name because he simply couldn't fire a gun, no matter how hard he tried.
- Maximillian Rose - A ruthless gangster who operates a spy ring out of the Manhattan Tower Hotel. Among his many criminal enterprises, he sells government secrets to the highest bidder, whether friend or foe. He supposedly dies trying to save all of his money, in the form of diamonds and valuable art, that were aboard the Hindenburg.
- Nancy "Jinx" Olsen - A pilot for the Coast Guard who longs for adventure and finds it when Bobby asks her to fly to where the Hindenburg will be docking. Jinx's dream is flight, but the misogynistic Coast Guard has made her their poster girl, who simply goes around to conferences and talks to people about being a pilot. When Bobby says he must reach the Hindenburg's docking site, she has been grounded from flying by the Coast Guard, but she sees how important it is for Bobby, and does it anyway.
- Winn Farrow - He is the nemesis of Max Rose who would stop at nothing to destroy Rose and his criminal empire. He hates Max because Max has become wealthy, whereas Winn's own, more reckless actions made him resort to living in an abandoned slaughterhouse in the Meatpacking District of New York and hiring gangsters to do his bidding. He is ultimately responsible for the blowing up of the LZ-129 (Hindenburg), for which he used a rocket.
- Aja Killian - The Traveler from Veelox. She is the one who showed Bobby and Spader that Saint Dane flumed to First Earth from Veelox. At the end of the book, she contacts Bobby to tell him that he needs to come back to Veelox.
- Patrick Mac -The Traveler from Third Earth. He plays a critical role when he shows Bobby and Gunny that the Nazis would win World War II if the Hindenburg is saved.
- Ludwig Zell - A Nazi Operative who worked with Maximillian Rose. Bobby and Spader searched everything about Ludwig Zell or about the Hindenburg, but they came out with nothing. Saint Dane had murdered Zell and assumed his form to prevent him to the Nazis that the Hindenburg was in danger.
- Peter Nelson - The gangster working for Winn Farrow. He is called Mr. Nervous Gangster because he is very hesitate about killing. He was brought to the flume to warn Bobby, Press and Spader on the territory of Cloral.
- Tony - The Bold Gangster that works with Winn Farrow alongside Peter Nelson. He is the gangster in charge when Bobby and Spader got to First Earth. Later on Tony got pushed off the Manhattan Tower Hotel by Saint Dane. He was the one who stole Bobby's Traveler ring.
