= Pendragon: Journal of an Adventure Through Time and Space =

Series of science fantasy novels by D. J. MacHale

- First, second, and third installments along with the box set casing
- The Merchant of Death, The Lost City of Faar, The Never War, The Reality Bug, Black Water, The Rivers of Zadaa, The Quillan Games, The Pilgrims of Rayne, Raven Rise, and The Soldiers of Halla.
- Author: D. J. MacHale
- Country: United States
- Language: English
- Genre: Young Adult, Science fiction novels
- Publisher: Simon & Schuster
- Published: 2002–2009
- Media type: Print (hardback and paperback)
- No. of books: 10

Pendragon: Journal of an Adventure Through Time and Space, abbreviated The Pendragon Adventure or simply Pendragon, is a series of ten young-adult science fiction and fantasy novels by American author D. J. MacHale, published from 2002 to 2009. The series chronicles the adventures of Bobby Pendragon, an American teenager who discovers that he must travel through time and space to prevent the destruction of the ten "territories": critical times and locations throughout the universe. The series has sold over a million copies.

Each book deals with the battle over a particular territory, fought by Bobby's side against the forces of Saint Dane, a shapeshifting demon, who exploits a decisive turning point for the local people of each territory. At this turning point, Saint Dane steps in to guide the territory towards utter chaos, while Bobby and his allies attempt to stop these efforts.

The novels use a first-person perspective through Bobby's handwritten journal entries, in which he recounts the events of his adventures to his loyal friends back home, Courtney Chetwynde and Mark Dimond, as well as a third-person narrative to tell the stories of characters other than Bobby—often, Courtney and Mark themselves. Each book of the series repeatedly alternates between these two narrative perspectives.

== Publication history ==
The first five books in the series, The Merchant of Death (2001), The Lost City of Faar (2001), The Never War (2002), The Reality Bug (2002), and Black Water (2003) were originally published in paperback by Aladdin Paperbacks. In 2004, Black Water made The New York Times' weekly nationwide top-ten list in the category "Children's Paperback Books," and a month later, for the first time, the series as a whole ranked in the category of "Children's Best Sellers: Series." The remaining five books, The Rivers of Zadaa (2005), The Quillan Games (2006), The Pilgrims of Rayne (2007), Raven Rise (2008), and The Soldiers of Halla (2009) were all originally published in hardback by Simon & Schuster. As of 2011, all books have been released in both formats.

A graphic novelization of The Merchant of Death was also released around the time of the ninth book. The tenth and final novel, The Soldiers of Halla, was released on May 12, 2009. A prequel trilogy created by MacHale but authored by other writers has also been published, collectively called Pendragon: Before the War.

== Plot overview ==
Robert "Bobby" Pendragon is an everyday athletic junior high school student from (fictional) Stony Brook, Connecticut, located in the greater New York metropolitan area. Bobby's Uncle Press reveals that he will train Bobby to become one of the "Travelers": wormhole-journeying young warriors from a variety of different planets and cultures, who are tasked with stopping or reversing the destruction being enacted by the villainous Saint Dane. Saint Dane is a shapeshifting demon whose favorite form is a tall human with icy blue eyes and long grey hair, but who can variously transform into a raven, a cloud of smoke, and a variety of other forms. He plans to destroy "what separates order from chaos"—the very fabric and structure of the universe, known as "Halla"—so that he can rebuild it according to his own twisted design. Uncle Press, the lead Traveler, introduces Bobby to the "flumes": enchanted tubes used by Travelers to journey among the ten "territories", which are especially eventful locations and time-periods in the universe. Press explains that Bobby is a resident and designated Traveler of the territory known as "Second Earth", which means planet Earth (especially centering on New York City) during the early 2000s (the present moment at the time of the series' publication).

Most of the novels in the series are structured around a similar basic conflict: as one of Halla's ten territories reaches a crucial turning point, in which its people must make a critical global decision for their future, Saint Dane arrives, hoping to lead the people towards self-destruction, especially through cultural homogenization, social inequality, discrimination, and totalitarianism. Bobby must then travel to each threatened territory to thwart Saint Dane's plans, sending journals back home (to Second Earth) to be received and kept safe by his best friends, Mark Dimond and Courtney Chetwynde, who become sometimes involved with the action and are deemed Bobby's "acolytes": personal helpers and record-keepers along Bobby's journey. There is one Traveler from each territory, and Bobby cooperates with all ten along his journey. Throughout the series, Saint Dane often confronts Bobby personally and asks him to join his side, but Bobby consistently refuses.

Bobby soon realizes his central role in the battle for Halla: that he is to replace his uncle as the lead Traveler, pursuing Saint Dane and helping to guide the territories back toward stability with the assistance of the other Travelers, their acolytes, and further allies. The turning points of the ten territories, in order, occur on: the medieval wilds of Denduron; the ocean-wide planet of Cloral; First Earth (the approximate time and location of the 1937 Hindenburg disaster); the virtual-reality wastelands of Veelox; the rainforests of Eelong; the deserts of Zadaa; the corporate monopoly-controlled arenas of Quillan; the semi-civilized island of Ibara (located on the planet Veelox, though 300 years after the "Veelox" territory); Second Earth; and, lastly, Third Earth (New York City in the year 5010).

Along his journeys, Bobby also learns martial arts, sometimes even dueling with Saint Dane one-on-one. Bobby also comes to respect the diverse peoples of Halla, who wildly differ in their social structures, technologies, philosophies, traditions, and other cultural aspects. He also has to adapt to each territory's environment to be ready to confront Saint Dane at a moment's notice. Bobby gradually learns the nature of what it really means to be a Traveler, first hinted at when Saint Dane mysteriously begins referring to the Travelers as "illusions". Saint Dane's long-term strategy also eventually surfaces, centering on a mysterious event called "the Convergence", in which the territories' turning points all begin to coincide, potentially causing an escalating chain reaction of chaos throughout Halla. Matters worsen when the Traveler from Quillan, named Nevva Winter, treacherously defects to Saint Dane's side. Meanwhile, the Convergence causes some territories to undergo a devastating and unanticipated second turning point.

By the ninth book, Bobby and his friends have successfully prevented the destruction of five territories, but they have failed in their fight against Saint Dane on Second Earth, Veelox, Ibara, and Quillan. Even worse, by overrunning Second Earth, Saint Dane manages to reverse all previous Traveler victories, allowing him to establish an elitist and genocidal cult called Ravinia. Ravinia openly marches its robot army of humanoid soldiers, "dados", throughout the territories, freely breaking down the boundaries between the territories. In the tenth and final book, Bobby finally learns about the true nature of Travelers: that he and the others are not actually humans at all, but rather, human-shaped guardian spirits created by something called Solara: the accumulated energy of all positive sentient knowledge and creativity. Contrarily, Saint Dane is a spirit arisen from a dark antithesis of Solara. Reuniting one last time, Bobby and the Travelers confront Saint Dane in a final battle on Third Earth to begin Halla's process toward recovery at last.

== Terminology ==
MacHale uses a variety of terms and ideas within the series, which are listed in fuller detail below.

- Acolyte: A person native to some territory who is chosen by that territory's Traveler as his or her own personal aid, including the receiver and keeper of that Traveler's journals.
- The Convergence: The chain-reaction event toward which Saint Dane manipulates Halla in which all the territories reach critical turning points simultaneously, spiraling them all toward joint chaos.
- Dado (/ˈdædoʊ/): Any humanoid robot member of the security and police forces of the monopolistic mega-corporation Blok (on Quillan) and which Saint Dane later mass-produces on Third Earth and elsewhere into his own personal armies. The name originates from the acronym D.A.D.O. (Dimond Alpha Digital Organization), a First Earth corporation that produces forge technology.
- Flume: Any of the tunnels that link each one of the territories with the other nine. At the entrance to a flume, a Traveler must speak the name of a territory, causing the flume to writhe to life, turning its rock walls into transparent crystal, emanating a jumble of pleasant musical notes, and lifting and pulling the Traveler gently into the flume towards the spoken destination.
- Forge: A shapeshifting, voice-activated technology patented by D.A.D.O. (though seemingly actually invented in Third Earth and stolen from that territory by Saint Dane) consisting of an object with flexible, elastic skin that can change into various simple geometric forms including a pyramid, a cube, and a sphere. Apparently, it is the main technology inside the robotic bodies of dados.
- Gar: The human race on Eelong, though the gar of Eelong tend to be of smaller stature than the humans of Earth and most are not educated or civilized, largely kept as "pets" or "live stock" in klee society.
- Halla: The multiverse, including every person, thing, time, and territory there ever was. Press Tilton describes it also as "what separates order from chaos." It includes at least seven worlds with human beings; Halla, however, is also physically divided (by Saint Dane's flumes) into ten distinct territories.
- The Jakills /ˈdʒækɪlz/: a rebellious youth subculture of seventeen critically thinking teenagers on the island territory Ibara, including Loque, Krayven, Twig, and their leader, Siry Remudi, who help Bobby Pendragon seek the world beyond their island's oceanic boundaries.
- Klee: the dominant, sapient species of Eelong, who have bipedal feline bodies and live in treetop village societies. They are the only non-human sentient species who has a Traveler any of the ten territories.
- Pentagram: The symbol of a five-pointed star made by interlocking lines, used by the spirits of Solara to designate the entrance to every flume and later adopted by the Ravinia cult.
- Quig: Any yellow-eyed, supernatural animal created by Saint Dane to guard the flume(s) of any territory where he is present to attack the Travelers and their allies. Local people of the territories do not recognize quigs as being anything more than indigenous animals. The territories each have their own type of quig: Cloral has 20-foot-long (6.1 m) sharks; Denduron has spike-backed, bear-like beasts; the Earth territories have giant dogs; Eelong has cannibalistic gars (humans); Ibara has swarming bees; Quillan has robotic spiders; and Zadaa has snakes; Veelox's quigs are never revealed.
- Ravinia: A militaristic political movement and religious cult, originating on Second Earth and led by Alexander Naymeer under the manipulation of Saint Dane, embracing the view that the elite and talented members of all territories should create a ruling class that subjugates and ultimately destroys everyone else. Saint Dane uses the cult as the main driving force in his plan to bring Halla into chaos.
- Solara: "The spiritual reflection of the state of Halla." Solara is the essence of all positive sentient thought and creativity and it looks different to every individual—a spiritual realm or state that is neither a territory itself nor part of any territory. When every person dies, their spiritual weight is added to the accumulation called Solara. As Saint Dane manipulates the people of the territories into making self-destructive decisions, Solara begins to split into a weakening "light" Solara and a strengthening "dark" Solara.
- Territory: Any of Saint Dane's divisions of Halla, the space-time continuum, characterized by some particular world in some particular time-period. There are ten territories in total: Cloral, Denduron, Veelox, Ibara (located on the same planet as Veelox), Eelong, Quillan, Zadaa, and three different time-periods of Earth (known as First Earth, Second Earth, and Third Earth).
- Traveler: Any person indigenous to one of the ten territories, given certain supernatural abilities and tasked with guarding that territory against Saint Dane, who calls Travelers "illusions". There are arguably two generations of Travelers, the first of which mentor the second. All Travelers, except the klee Traveler from Eelong, take the form of humans. Travelers have occasionally demonstrated the following superpowers: heightened persuasiveness; hearing all speech and reading all writing as their own native language (also known as omnilinguality); remarkable and rapid powers to heal both oneself and others; the apparent ability to read the minds of those around them; the (exceptionally rare) ability to transform into other living beings.
