= D. J. MacHale =

American writer and director

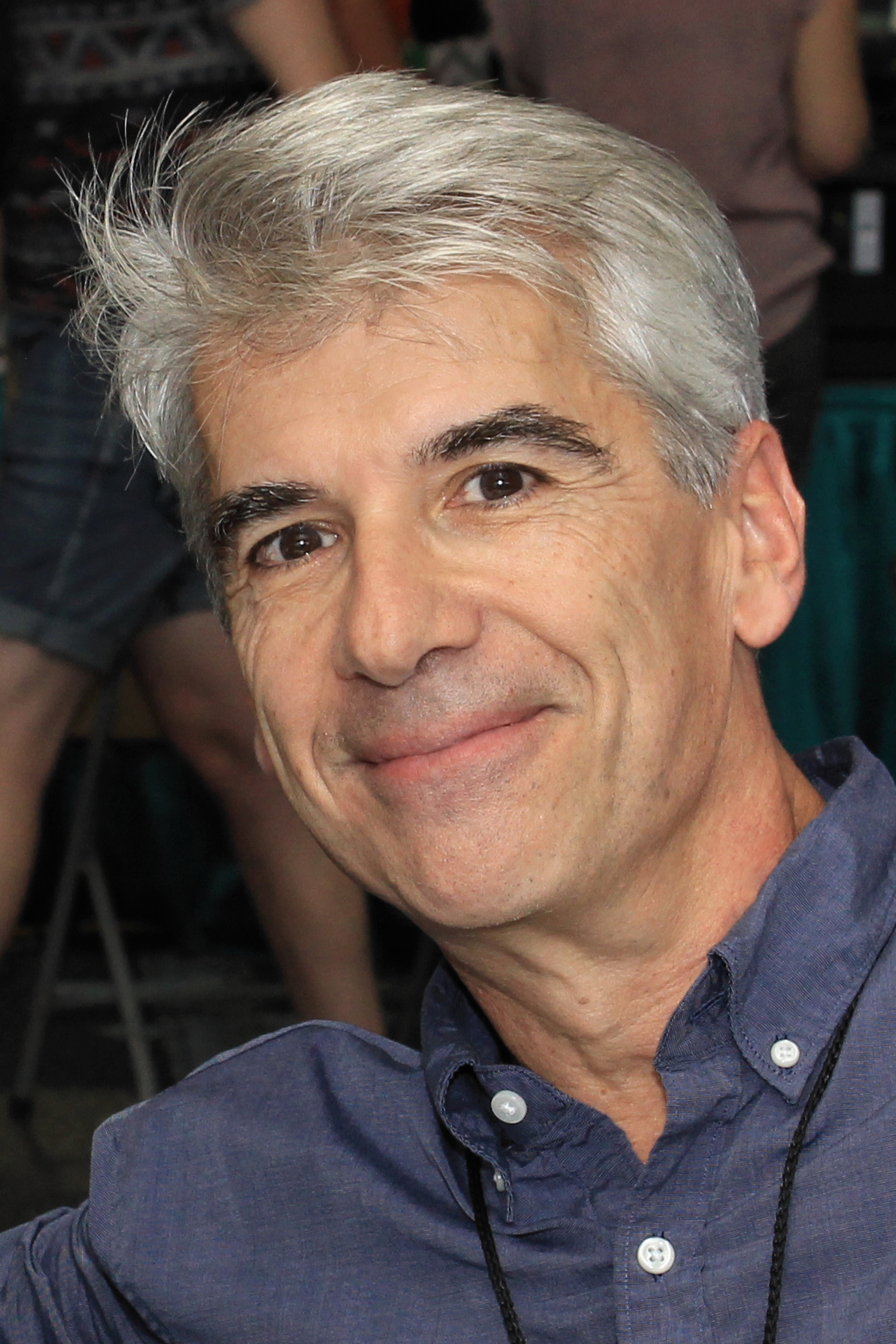
- MacHale at the 2016 Texas Book Festival
- Born: Donald James MacHale; March 11, 1956 (age 70); Port Chester, New York, U.S.
- Education: New York University
- Occupations: Writer and director
- Writing career
- Notable works: Pendragon; Morpheus Road
- Notable awards: CableACE Award; Gemini Award
- Website: djmachalebooks.com

Donald James MacHale (born March 11, 1956) is an American writer, director, and executive producer. He has been affiliated with shows such as Are You Afraid of the Dark?, Flight 29 Down and Seasonal Differences. MacHale is also the author of the popular young adult book series, Pendragon and Morpheus Road.

== Early life ==
MacHale was born on March 11, 1956, in Port Chester, New York and grew up in Greenwich, Connecticut where he had several jobs including collecting eggs at a poultry farm, engraving sports trophies, and washing dishes in a steakhouse. In school he played football and ran track. It was while attending Western Junior High School that he and friends began making video productions that ranged from short documentaries to a feature-length Marx Brothers comedy.

Upon graduation from Greenwich High School, MacHale attended Villanova University for three semesters, then transferred to New York University where he graduated with a BFA in film production.

== Awards ==
MacHale won the CableACE Award for his series Chris Cross and the Gemini Award for Are You Afraid of the Dark?

He received a Writers Guild of America award as well as a second WGA nomination for his work on the TV series Flight 29 Down.

He received a Directors Guild of America award nomination for his work on the TV series Flight 29 Down.

== Works ==
- ABC Afterschool Special (Multiple episodes of the TV Series)
- Are You Afraid of the Dark? (TV Series)
- Tower of Terror (Movie)
- Flight 29 Down (TV Series)
- Seasonal Differences (Episode of the Afterschool Special TV Series)
- Ghostwriter (Pilot episodes of the TV series)
- Encyclopedia Brown (TV Series)
- Pendragon: Journal of an Adventure Through Time and Space (Book Series)
- East of the Sun and West of the Moon (Penned Adaptation)
- Chris Cross (TV Series)
- The Guide to the Territories of Halla (2005): provides information about the Pendragon Adventure book series up to book five, Black Water, including the era, land mass, events, currency, and recreation.
- Morpheus Road (Book Series)
- The Monster Princess (Picture Book)
- The SYLO Chronicles (book series) SYLO, STORM, and STRIKE
- The Library (book series) Curse of the Boggin; Black Moon Rising; The Oracle of Doom
- Voyagers (1st book of the series)
- The Equinox Curiosity Shop (Audible Original audio book)
- Trinity (Novel featured in the Ghostwriter TV series)
- Beyond Midnight - Seven Peculiar Tales of Mystery and Suspense (short story collection)
- The Paper Trail (novel)
- The Tyrian League (Book Series)
