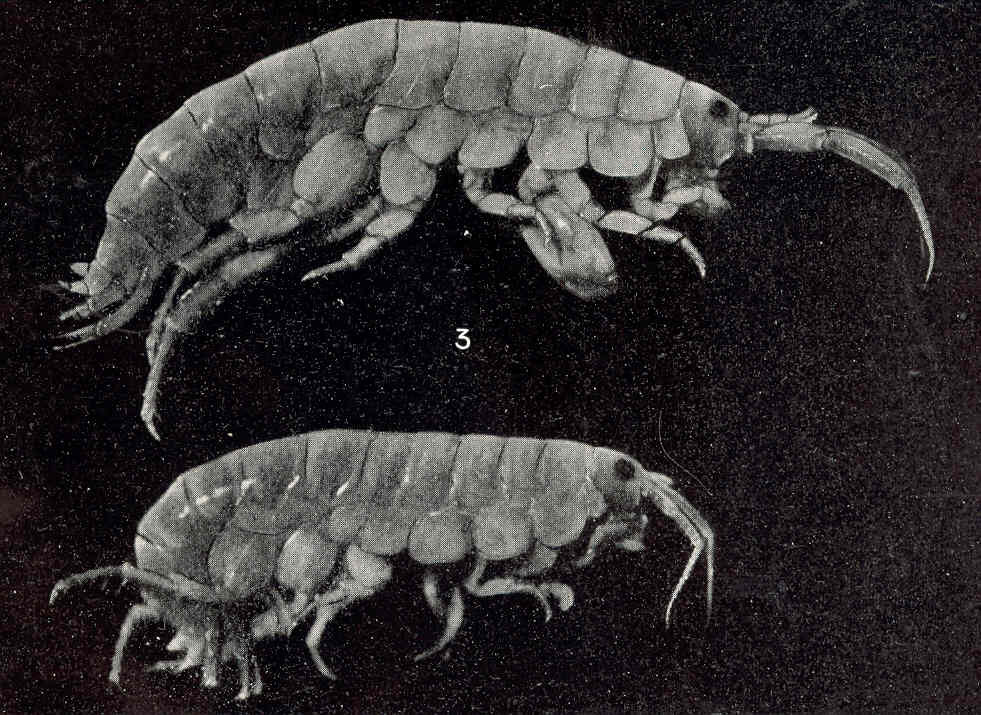
- Male and female

Scientific classification
- Kingdom: Animalia
- Phylum: Arthropoda
- Class: Malacostraca
- Order: Amphipoda
- Family: Talitridae
- Genus: Platorchestia
- Species: P. platensis

Binomial name
- Platorchestia platensis (Krøyer, 1845)

Synonyms
- Orchestia agilis

= Platorchestia platensis =

Species of crustacean

Platorchestia platensis is a species of sand flea, an amphipod crustacean that lives on beaches.

== Ecology ==
In common with other sand fleas of the family Talitridae, P. platensis lives above the littoral zone in moist sand or rotting seaweed. There appears to be competitive exclusion between P. platensis and the native Orchestia gammarellus on European beaches.

== Distribution ==
The native range of P. platensis is not known in detail, but it is probably circumtropical. The species description was based on specimens collected near the commercial port of Montevideo, and the species probably spreads through ship's ballast. It was first discovered in northern Europe in 1860 on a beach near Humlebæk, Denmark. By the 1940s, it was common on both sides of the Kattegat; it reached the Netherlands around 1950, and the United Kingdom in 1978.

== Taxonomy ==
Platorchestia platensis was originally described as Orchestia platensis by Henrik Nikolai Krøyer in 1845, based on type material from the Río de la Plata in Uruguay.
