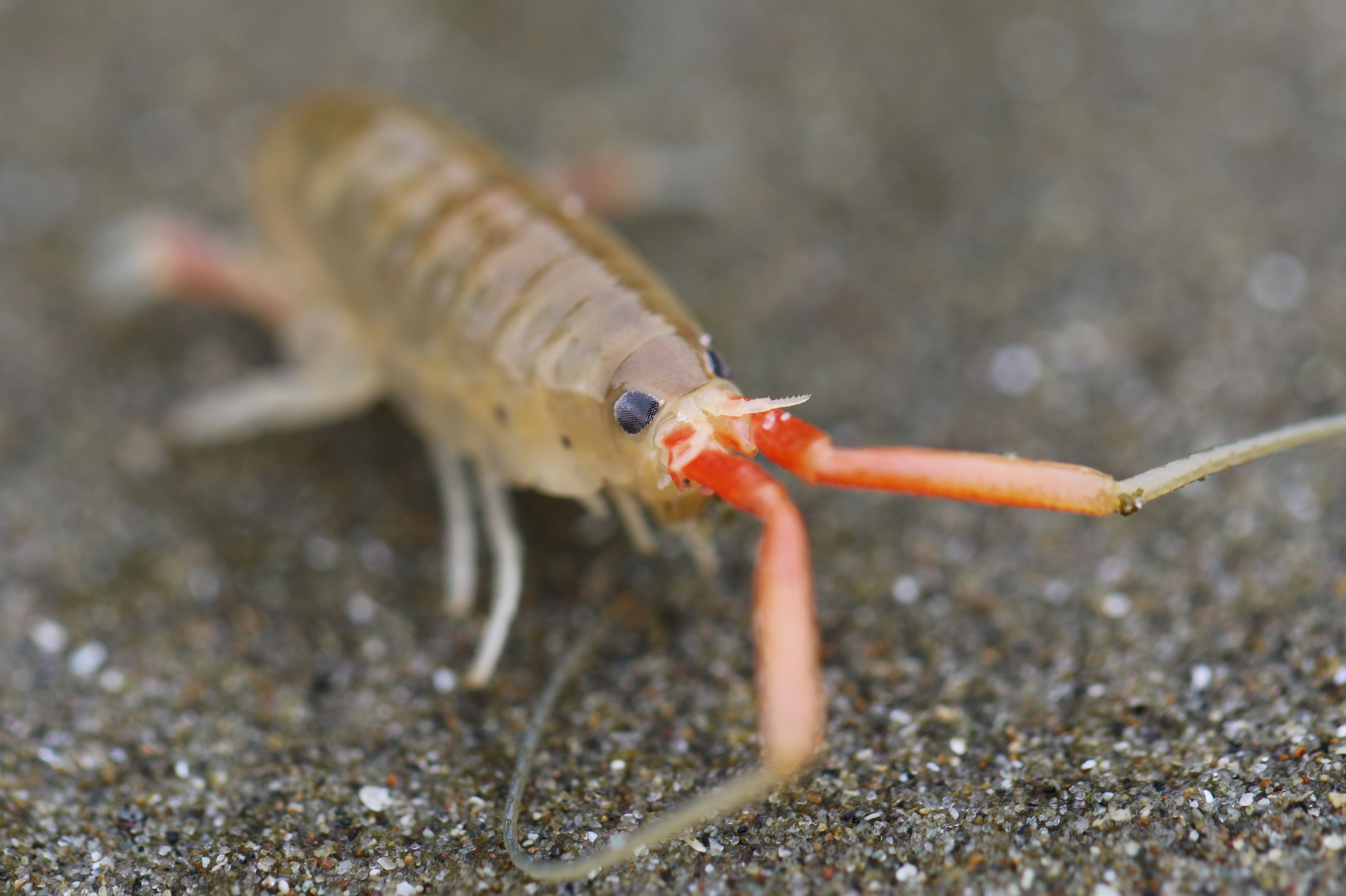

Scientific classification
- Kingdom: Animalia
- Phylum: Arthropoda
- Class: Malacostraca
- Order: Amphipoda
- Family: Talitridae
- Genus: Megalorchestia
- Species: M. californiana

Binomial name
- Megalorchestia californiana Brandt, 1851

Synonyms
- Orchestoidea californiana

= Megalorchestia californiana =

Species of crustacean

Megalorchestia californiana is a species of sand-hopper in the family Talitridae. It was first described in 1851 by the German naturalist Johann Friedrich von Brandt and is the type species of the genus Megalorchestia. It is commonly known as the long-horned beach hopper or the California beach flea.

== Distribution and habitat ==
M. californiana is native to the west coast of North America where its range extends from Vancouver Island in British Columbia to Laguna Beach, California. It is found on slightly sloping sandy beaches and retreats far up the beach, in contrast to the short-horned beach hopper (Megalorchestia corniculata) which is found on steeply sloping sandy shores and does not occur so high up the beach.

== Description ==
M. californiana grow to about an inch long. They have gray-white or ivory-colored body, which is typically semi-transparent, but it becomes opaque before the organism molts. Adults have red antennae, while those of juveniles tend to be more orange in color.

== Ecology ==
M. californiana tends to hide in a shallow burrow or under heaps of dead seaweed during the day, emerging at night or in dull weather to feed on decaying seaweed or organic debris left behind by beach-goers. Just before dawn the beach hoppers retreat under the sand, and males can sometimes be seen fighting each other for possession of an existing burrow in preference to digging a new one.
