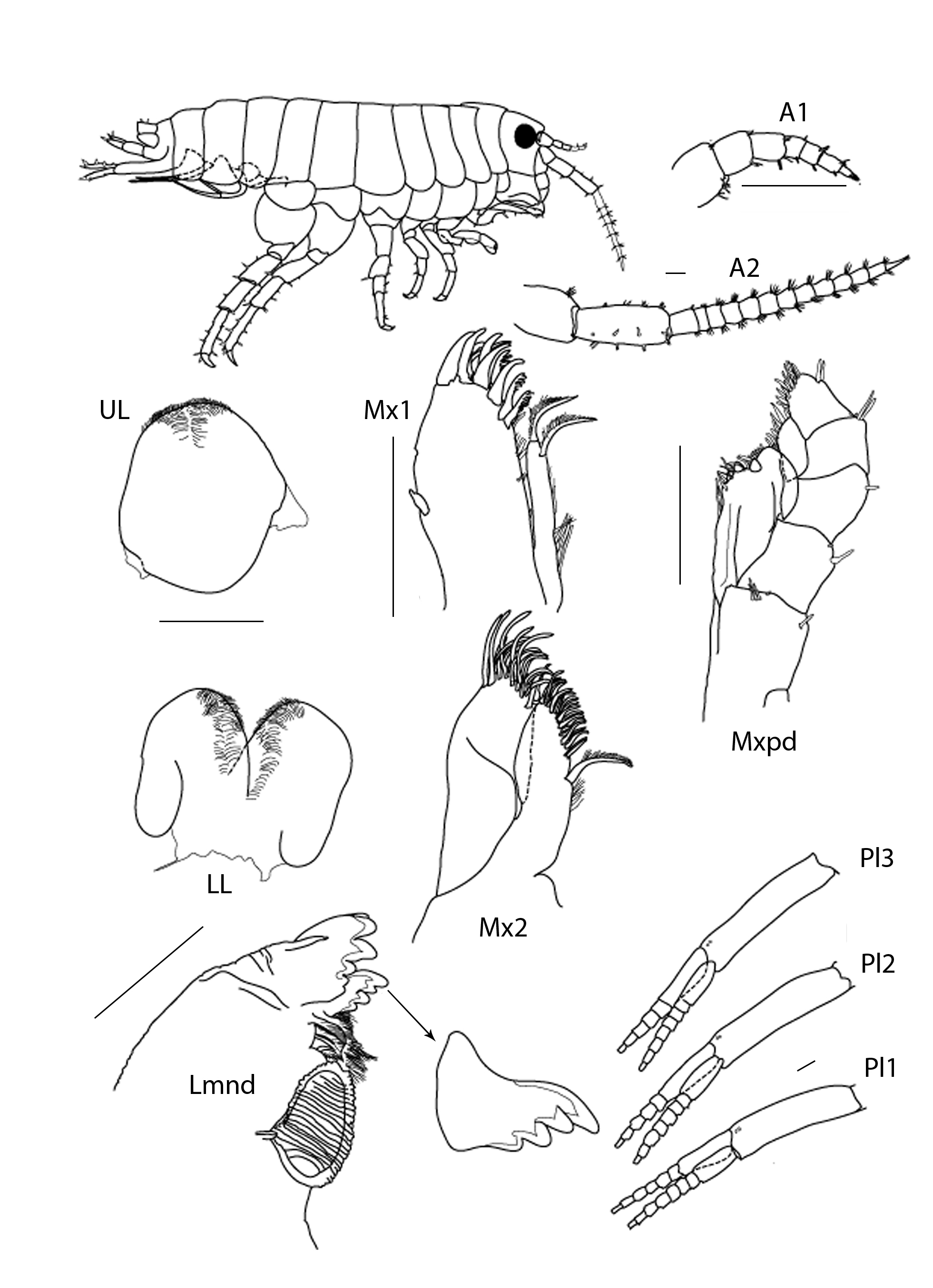

Scientific classification
- Kingdom: Animalia
- Phylum: Arthropoda
- Clade: Pancrustacea
- Class: Malacostraca
- Order: Amphipoda
- Family: Talitridae
- Genus: Orchestia
- Species: O. mediterranea

Binomial name
- Orchestia mediterranea A. Costa, 1853

Synonyms
- Neotenorchestia kenwildishi Wildish, 2014; Orchestia laevis

= Orchestia mediterranea =

Species of crustacean

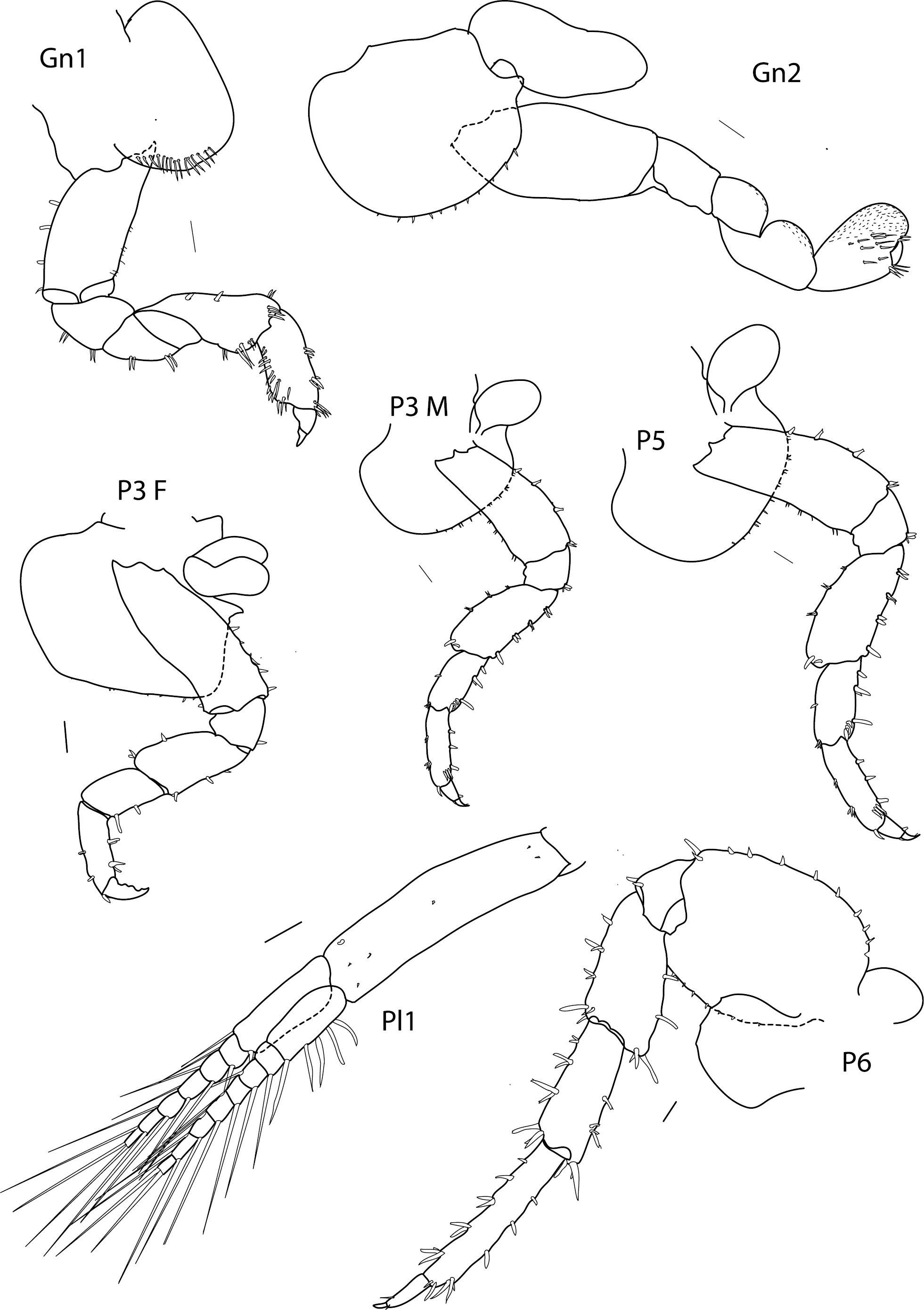
Drawings of Orchestia mediterranea limbs

Orchestia mediterranea, sometimes called the Mediterranean beach hopper, is a species of amphipod in the family Talitridae (sandhoppers).

== Description ==
This species grows to a maximum length of 19 mm (0.75 in) and is pink in colour. It can be distinguished from Orchestia gammarellus by the ramus (branch) of its pleopods (swimming legs), which are as long as, or longer than, the peduncle (base segment of the antenna); in O. gammarellus the ramus of the pleopods is much shorter than the peduncle.

== Distribution ==
Orchestia mediterranea is found in the Mediterranean Sea, Black Sea and the seas around Great Britain and Ireland.

== Behaviour ==
Infection with the parasite Paramarteilia orchestiae can cause intersexual attributes in male Orchestia mediterranea.

A study in Bizerte found that Orchestia mediterranea was more common in autumn than summer.
