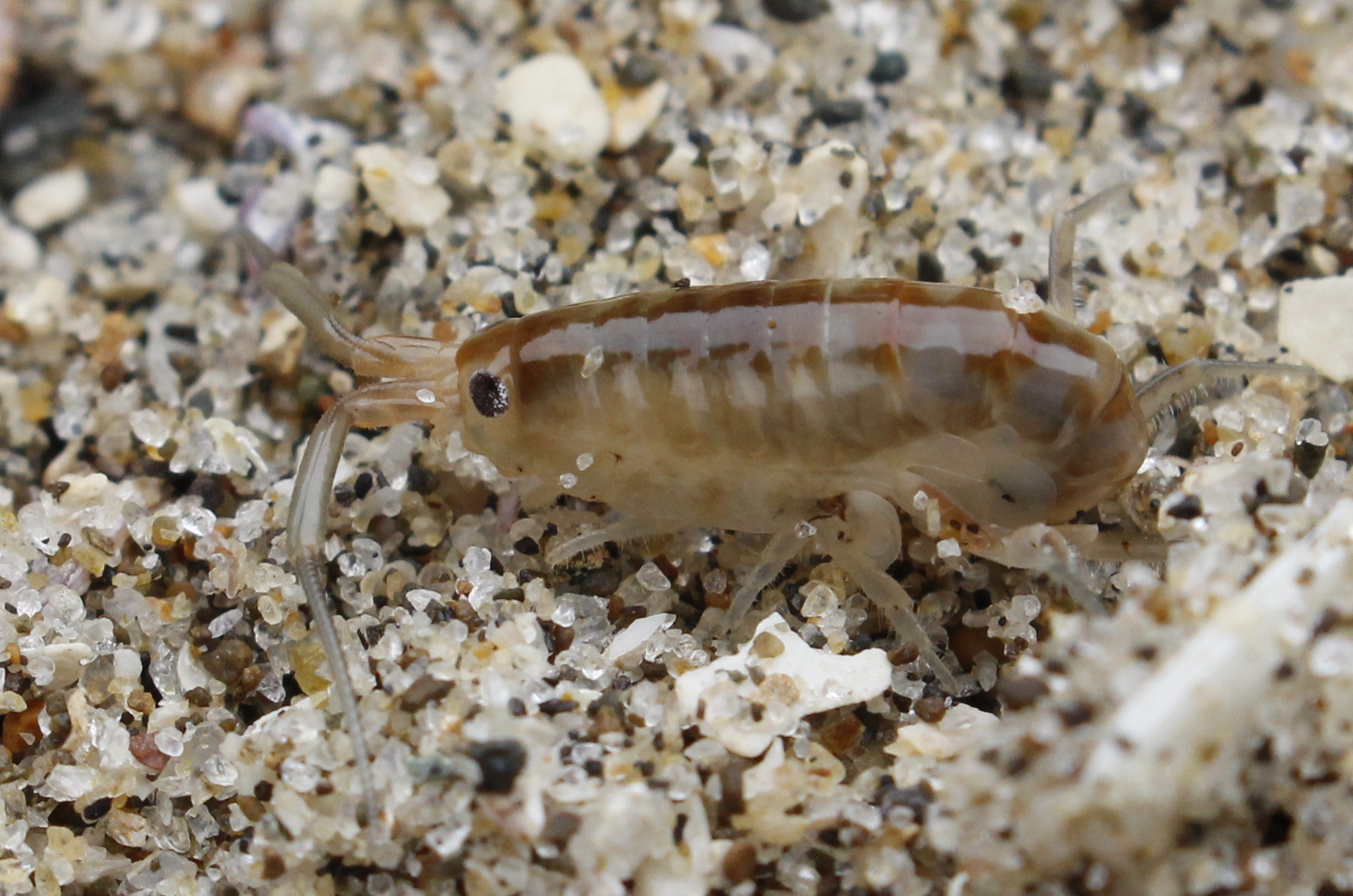

Scientific classification
- Domain: Eukaryota
- Kingdom: Animalia
- Phylum: Arthropoda
- Class: Malacostraca
- Order: Amphipoda
- Family: Talitridae
- Genus: Bellorchestia
- Species: B. quoyana

Binomial name
- Bellorchestia quoyana (H. Milne-Edwards, 1840)

Synonyms
- Talitrus brevicornis Milne-Edwards, 1840; Talorchestia quoyana (H. Milne-Edwards, 1840); Orchestia quoyana H. Milne-Edwards, 1840

= Bellorchestia quoyana =

Species of crustacean

Bellorchestia quoyana (formerly Talorchestia quoyana) is the largest and most common species of sandhopper endemic to New Zealand. It was originally described as Orchestia quoyana in 1840 by French zoologist Henri Milne-Edwards and transferred to the genus Bellorchestia in 2008. Its length is up to 29 millimetres (1.1 in). They help to keep the beaches clean by breaking down any organic material, which is vital for plant succession. They are nocturnal and bury themselves up to 30 centimetres (12 in) during the day (the drier the sand, the deeper they go).

== Taxonomy ==
Bellorchestia quoyana (H. Milne-Edwards, 1840) was originally described as Orchestia quoyana H. Milne-Edwards, 1840 by French zoologist Henri Milne-Edwards. The species was transferred to Talorchestia in 1906 by Thomas Stebbing, and later to the newly-described genus Bellorchestia in 2008 by carcinologists Cristiana S. Serejo and James K. Lowry.

== Description ==
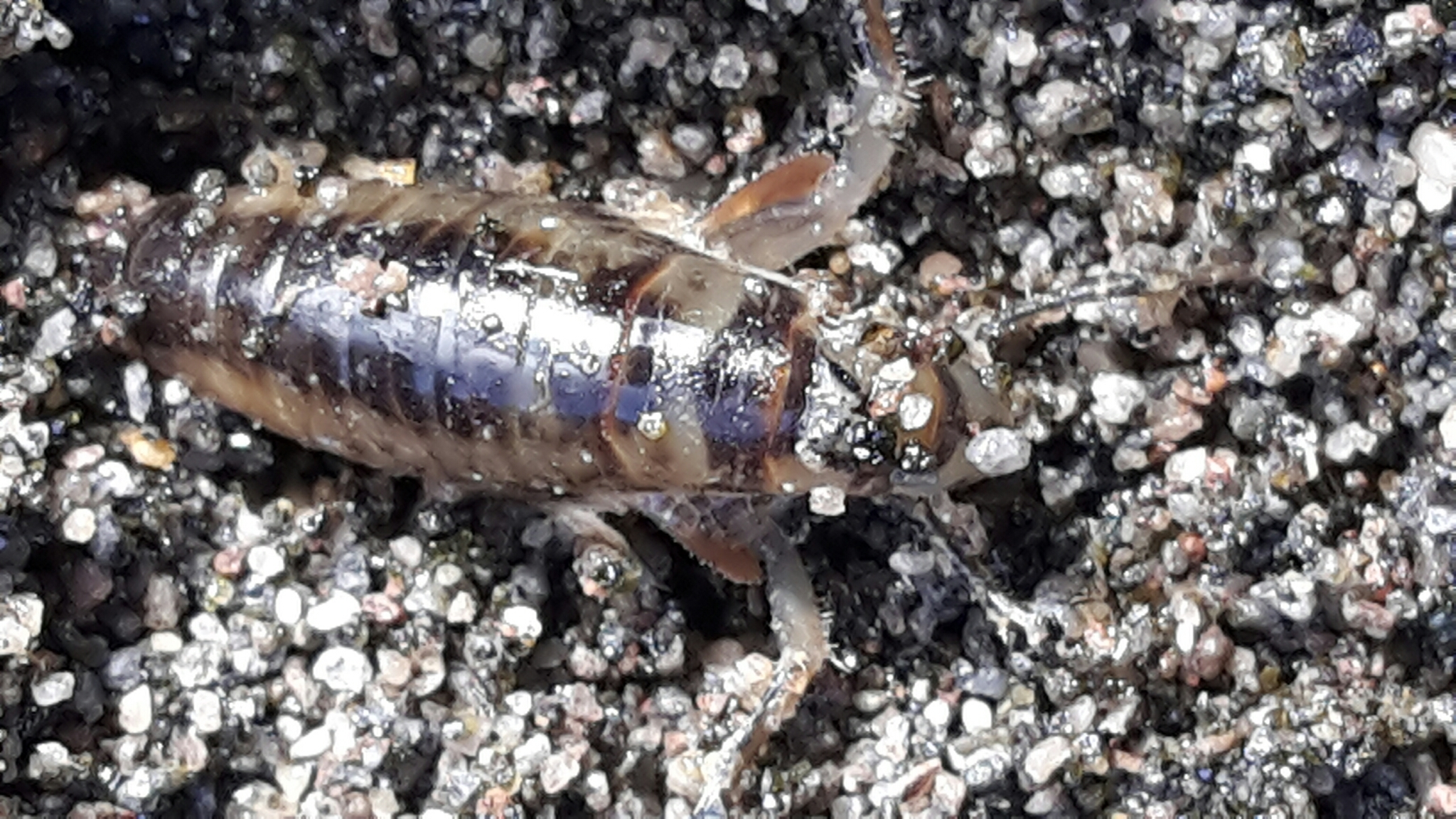
B. quoyana observed on sand near New Plymouth, North Island, New Zealand

Bellorchestia quoyana reaches lengths of 29 millimetres, with males being slightly larger than females. The body is typically light-yellowish brown with marbled markings of a darker brown generally simulating the appearance of sand. It has a single pair of black eyes and two distinct pairs of antennae. The first pair of antennae are short and extend a little beyond the first joint of antennae 2. The second pair are more robust and extent beyond the head and first three body segments in females, and over half the body length in males. The second section of antennae 2 is twice the length of the first.

Jumping action is achieved by balancing on third to last pair of legs while turning the abdomen under the body so the end of the uropods and telson press on to the ground. The last two pairs of legs are held parallel to but not touching the ground. When the abdomen is suddenly straightened out the animal is propelled into the air. On landing the abdominal limbs and last two pairs of legs are used as shock absorbers to cushion the impact.

== Distribution ==
Bellorchestia quoyana is found on sandy beaches all around the coasts of New Zealand.
