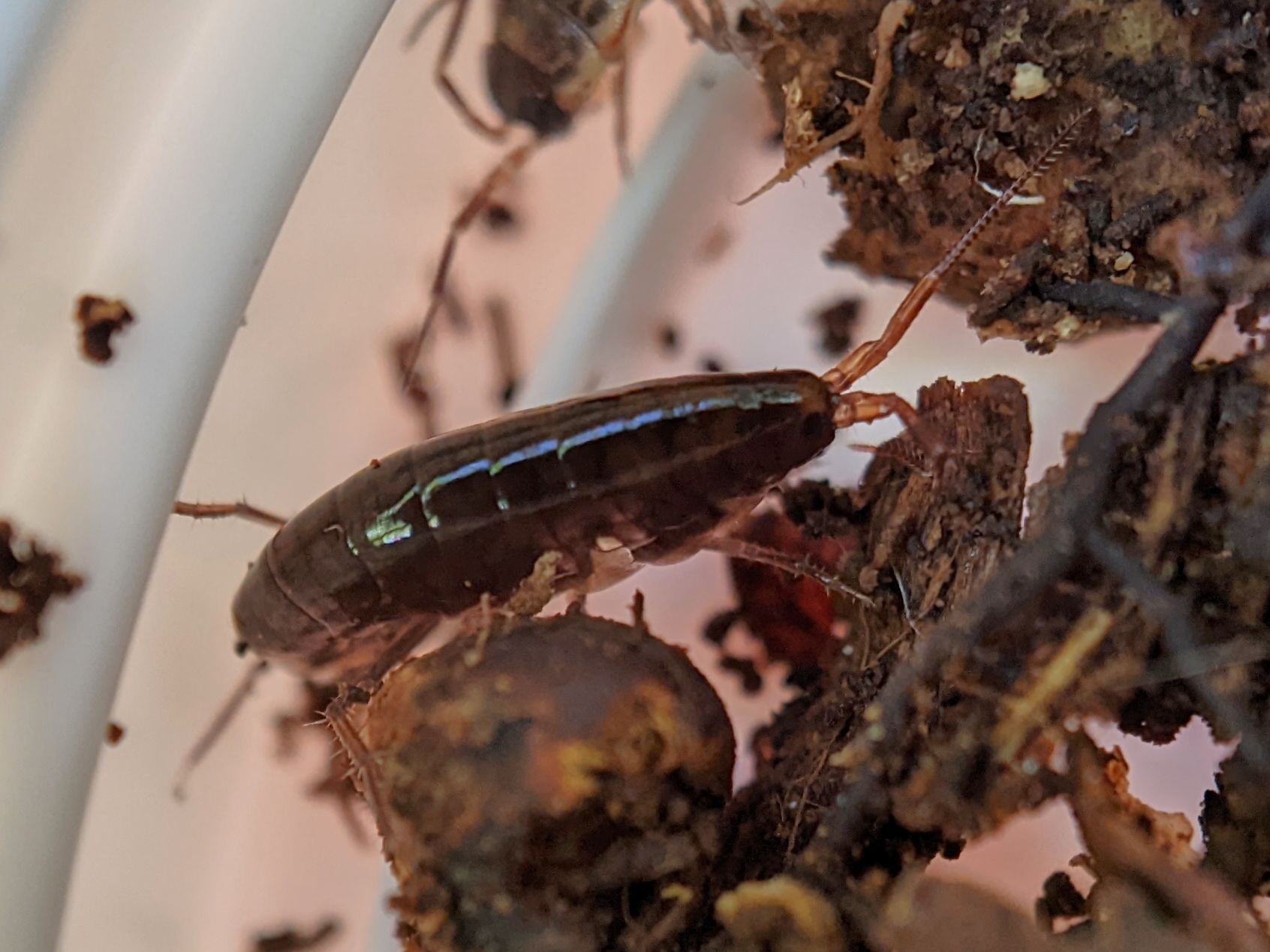

Scientific classification
- Kingdom: Animalia
- Phylum: Arthropoda
- Clade: Pancrustacea
- Class: Malacostraca
- Order: Amphipoda
- Family: Talitridae
- Genus: Arcitalitrus
- Species: A. dorrieni

Binomial name
- Arcitalitrus dorrieni (Hunt, 1925)

Synonyms
- Talitrus dorrieni Hunt, 1925; Talitroides dorrieni (Hunt, 1925)

= Arcitalitrus dorrieni =

Species of crustacean

Arcitalitrus dorrieni, commonly known as the landhopper, woodhopper or lawn shrimp, is a crustacean in the family Talitridae. It is the only truly terrestrial amphipod found in the British Isles.

== Description ==
Arcitalitrus dorrieni is a small, land-dwelling shrimp-like creature. Unlike its marine relatives, it breathes air through gills housed in a gill chamber beneath its thorax. This adaptation allows it to survive on land, but it requires moist environments to prevent its gills from drying out.

== Distribution and habitat ==
Arcitalitrus dorrieni is an introduced species in Britain and Ireland, being native to Australia and nearby islands. It is believed to have arrived in the early 20th century, possibly through the transport of plants. It is most commonly found in the west and south of these regions, where the climate is milder and more humid. Its preferred habitat is damp and sheltered areas with a thick layer of leaf litter, such as woodlands, gardens, and hedgerows.

== Ecology ==
Arcitalitrus dorrieni is a detritivore, feeding on decaying organic matter such as fallen leaves and dead wood. It plays a role in the decomposition process and helps to recycle nutrients in the soil. Due to its specific habitat requirements, it is not considered a pest.
