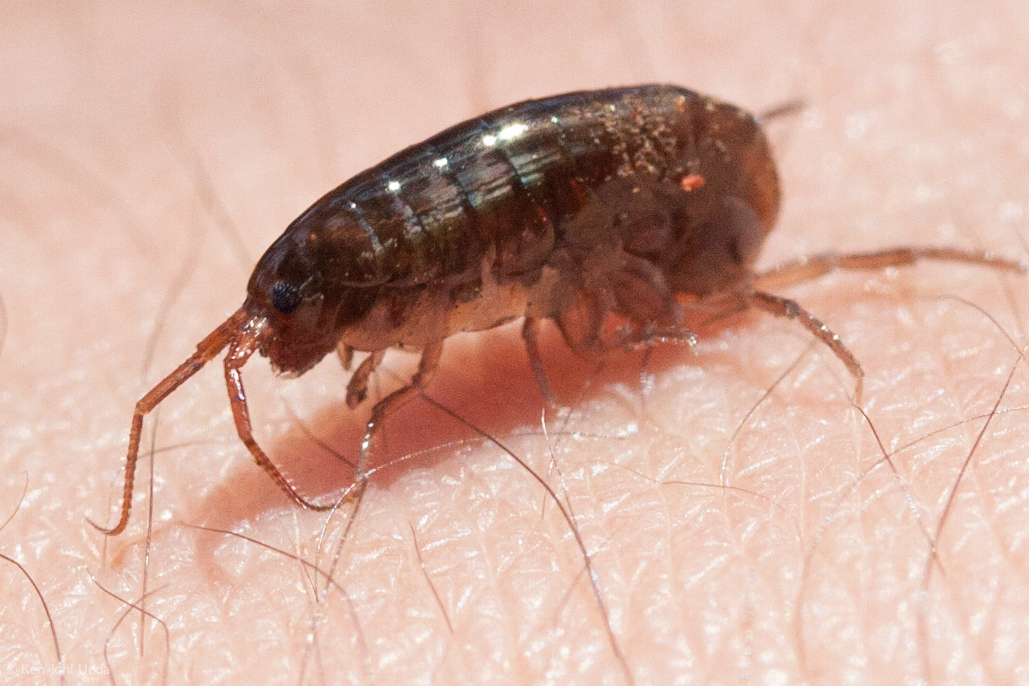
- Arcitalitrus sylvaticus

Scientific classification
- Domain: Eukaryota
- Kingdom: Animalia
- Phylum: Arthropoda
- Class: Malacostraca
- Order: Amphipoda
- Family: Talitridae
- Genus: Arcitalitrus; Hurley, 1975

= Arcitalitrus =

Genus of crustaceans

Arcitalitrus is a genus of beach hoppers in the family Talitridae. There are nine described species in Arcitalitrus.

== Species ==
These nine species belong to the genus Arcitalitrus:

- Arcitalitrus bassianus Friend, 1987
- Arcitalitrus belbucca Peart & Lowry, 2006
- Arcitalitrus bundeena Peart & Lowry, 2006
- Arcitalitrus dorrieni (Hunt, 1925)
- Arcitalitrus moonpar Peart & Lowry, 2006
- Arcitalitrus nana Peart & Lowry, 2006
- Arcitalitrus orara Peart & Lowry, 2006
- Arcitalitrus sylvaticus (Haswell, 1879) (lawn shrimp)
- Arcitalitrus thora Peart & Lowry, 2006
