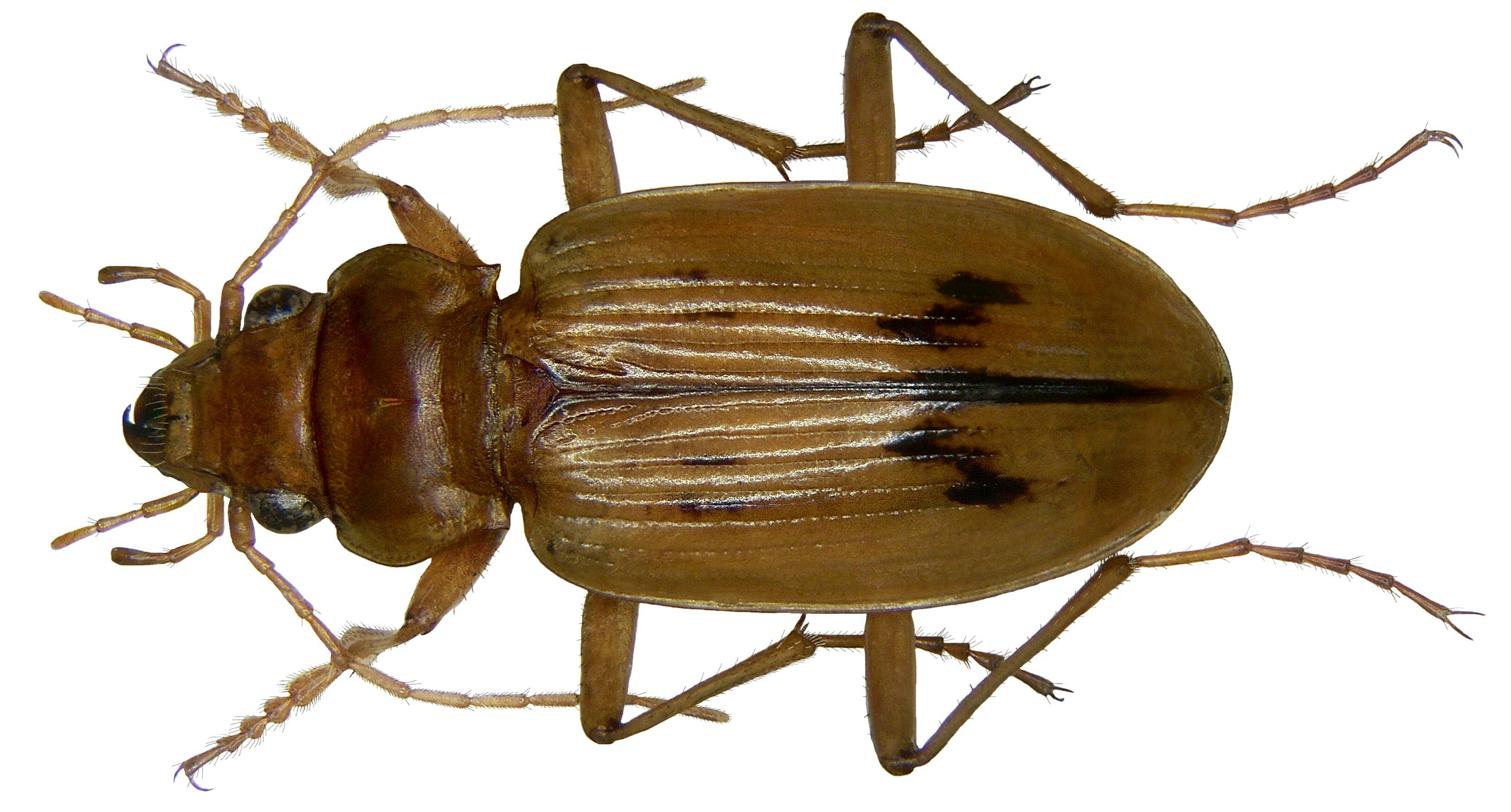

Scientific classification
- Kingdom: Animalia
- Phylum: Arthropoda
- Clade: Pancrustacea
- Class: Insecta
- Order: Coleoptera
- Suborder: Adephaga
- Family: Carabidae
- Genus: Nebria
- Species: N. complanata

Binomial name
- Nebria complanata (Linné, 1767)

= Nebria complanata =

Species of beetle

Nebria complanata is a species of ground beetle native to West and South Europe. It is a coastal species predatory on Talitrus saltator and Talorchestia brito.
