= Uhlorchestia uhleri =

Scientific classification
- Domain: Eukaryota
- Kingdom: Animalia
- Phylum: Arthropoda
- Class: Malacostraca
- Order: Amphipoda
- Family: Talitridae
- Genus: Uhlorchestia
- Species: U. uhleri

Binomial name
- Uhlorchestia uhleri (Shoemaker, 1930)

Species of crustacean

Uhlorchestia uhleri is a species of beach hopper in the family Talitridae.
