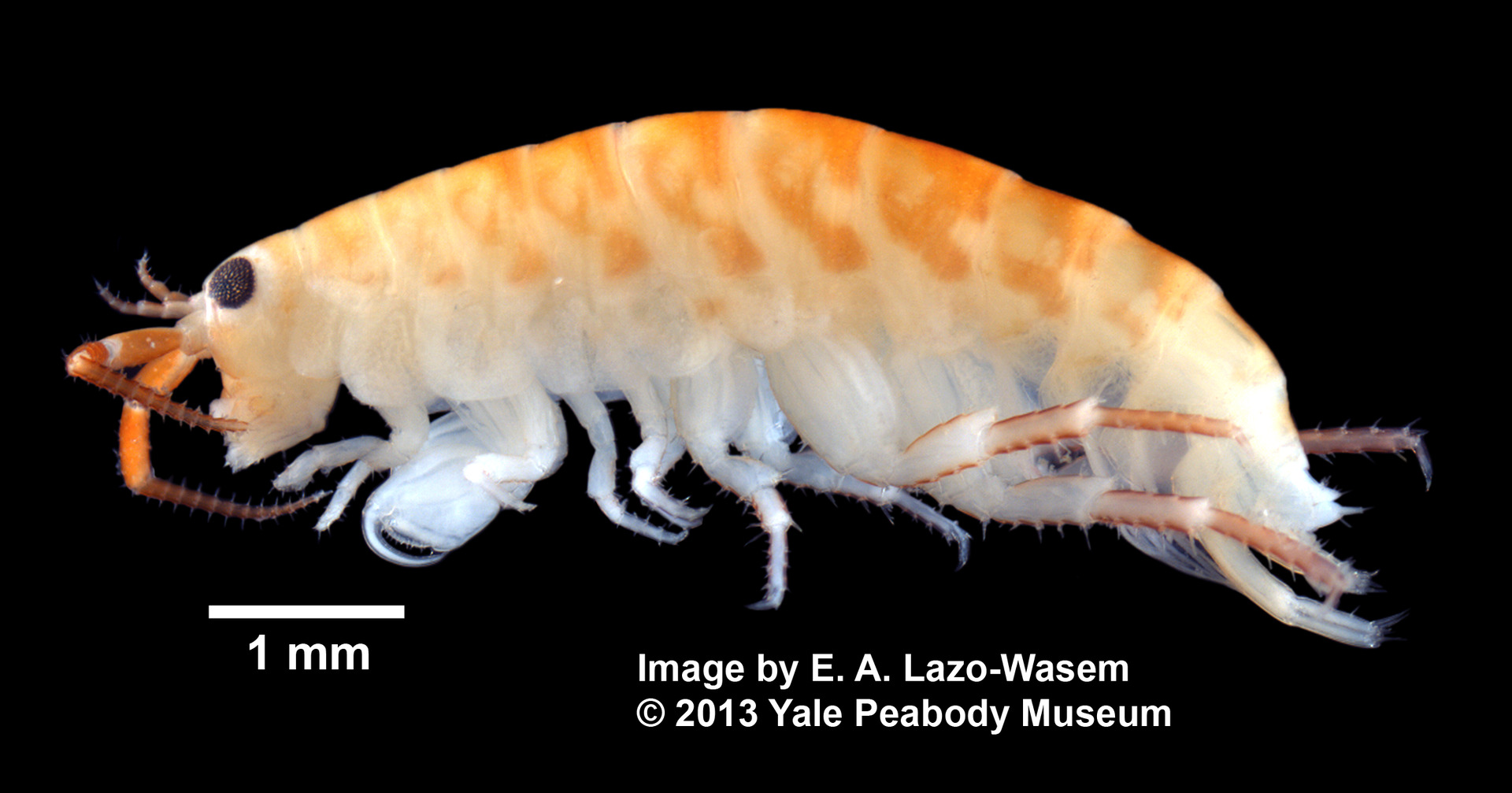

Scientific classification
- Domain: Eukaryota
- Kingdom: Animalia
- Phylum: Arthropoda
- Class: Malacostraca
- Order: Amphipoda
- Family: Talitridae
- Genus: Orchestia
- Species: O. grillus

Binomial name
- Orchestia grillus (Bosc, 1802)

= Orchestia grillus =

Species of crustacean

Orchestia grillus is a species of beach hopper in the family Talitridae. It is found in South America.
