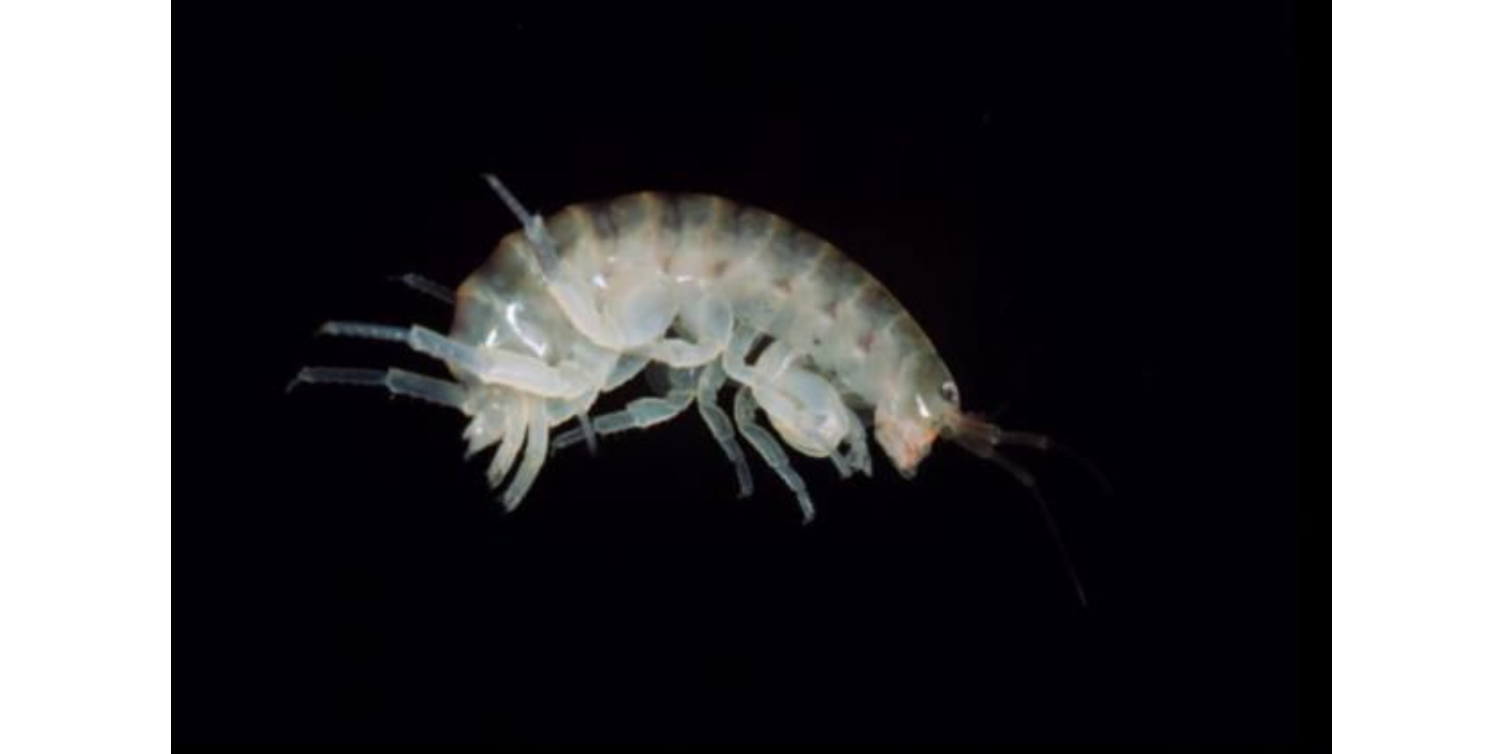
- NMV J20374

Scientific classification
- Kingdom: Animalia
- Phylum: Arthropoda
- Clade: Pancrustacea
- Class: Malacostraca
- Order: Amphipoda
- Family: Talitridae
- Genus: Bellorchestia
- Species: B. marmorata

Binomial name
- Bellorchestia marmorata (Haswell, 1880)

Synonyms
- Talorchestia marmorata Haswell, 1880; Orchestia marmorata Stebbing, 1906

= Bellorchestia marmorata =

Species of crustacean

Bellorchestia marmorata is a marine amphipod in the Talitridae family.

It was first described in 1880 by William Aitcheson Haswell as Talorchestia marmorata, was also described by Thomas Roscoe Rode Stebbing in 1906 as Orchestia marmorata, and in 2008 was reassigned to the genus, Bellorchestia.

It is found only in the supralittoral zones of Tasmania's coastlines.
