= Oxwich Bay =

Bay in Swansea, Wales

Coordinates: 51.56581°N 4.14679°W

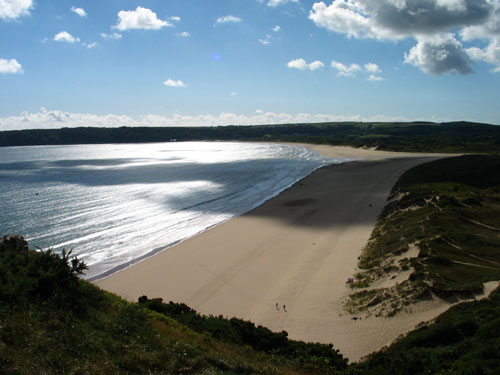
Oxwich Bay on the Gower Peninsula of South Wales

Oxwich Bay (Welsh: Bae Oxwich) is a bay on the south of the Gower Peninsula, Wales.

== Bay ==
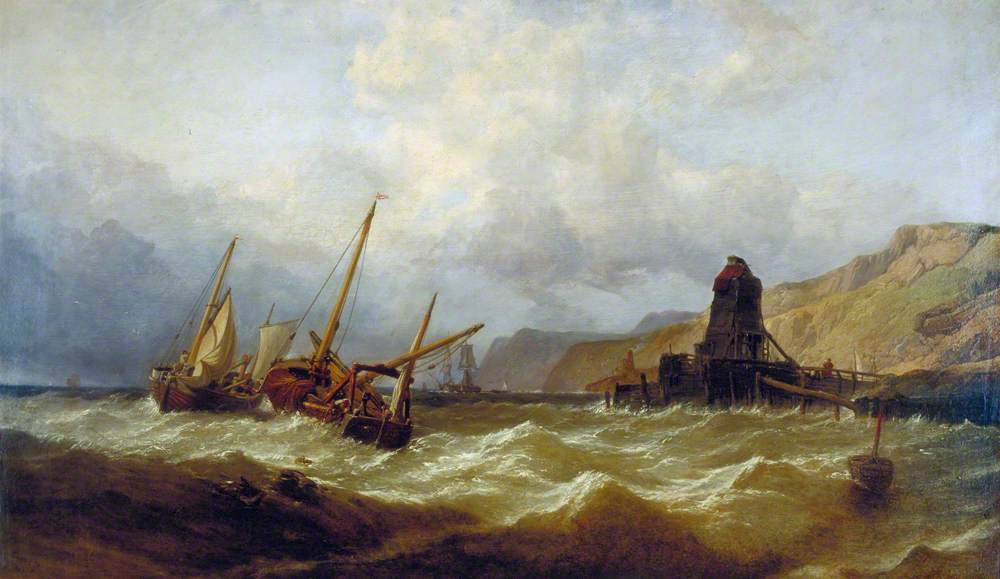
Oxwich Bay by Clarkson Stanfield, 1851

Its landscape features sand dunes, salt marshes and woodland. Oxwich Bay includes a 2 1/2-mile (4 km) long sandy beach, accessible from the village of Oxwich. It is a popular spot for swimming and watersports including diving, sailing, water skiing and windsurfing. There is a public footpath along the cliffs from Oxwich Bay, around Oxwich Point, and to Port Eynon Bay. Buses run every couple of hours between Oxwich and Port Eynon.

A wetland site at the rear of the dunes forms Oxwich Burrows National Nature Reserve. The dunes are crossed by a small stream called Nicholaston Pill. The bay ends at the eastern end with the cliffs of High Tor; but at low tide, a continuous sandy beach connects with Three Cliffs Bay beyond. Within the nature reserve there are rare plants such as the dune gentian and the round-leafed wintergreen, insects such as the small blue, beachcomber beetle and the hairy dragonfly while the wetlands are important for birds, a bird hide is located at Whitestones which is accessed by a boardwalk through the wetlands. The birds present include water rail, little grebe and wildfowl, as well as the occasional wintering great bittern.

Submarine cables leave the mainland of Britain from Oxwich. These include the SOLAS cable across the Irish Sea, and the TAT-11 and Gemini North transatlantic telephone cables. These latter two do not terminate here but instead continue on to France (TAT-11) and England (Gemini).

On 1 February 2007, Oxwich beach was named the most beautiful in Britain.
