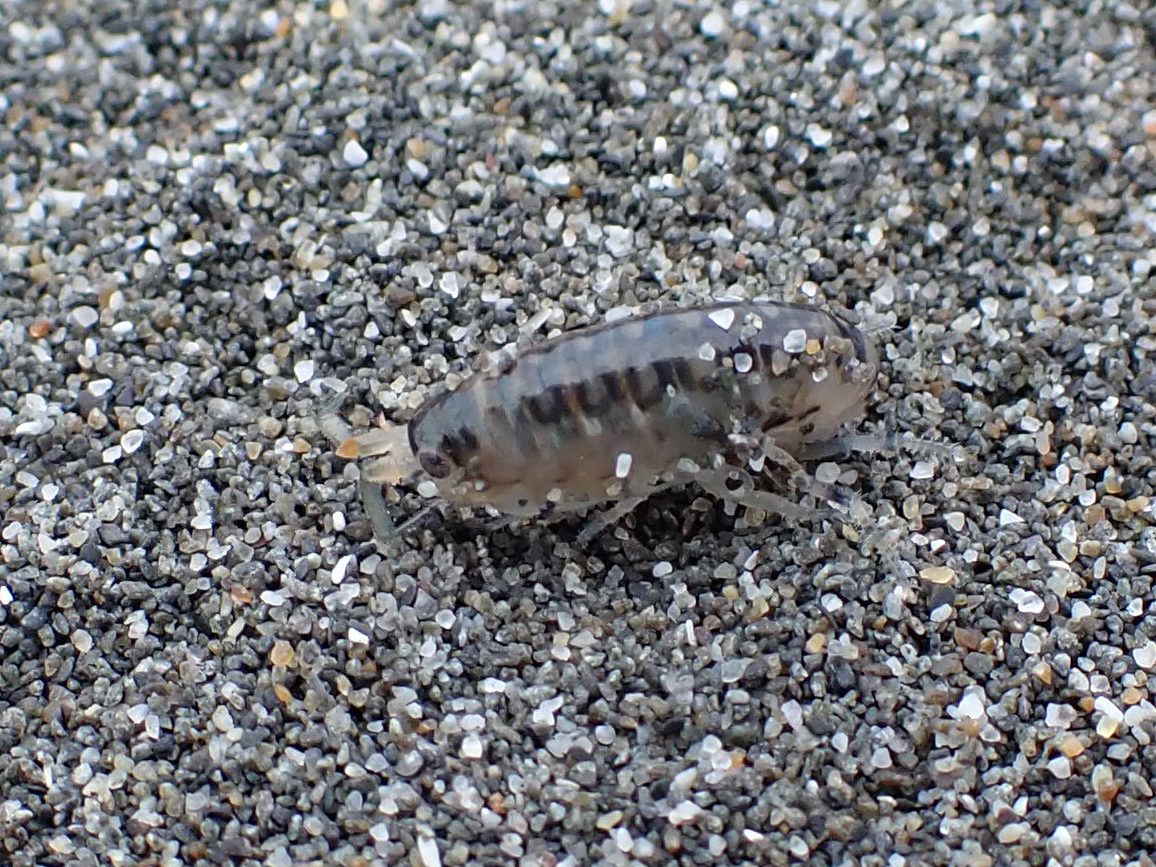

Scientific classification
- Domain: Eukaryota
- Kingdom: Animalia
- Phylum: Arthropoda
- Class: Malacostraca
- Order: Amphipoda
- Family: Talitridae
- Genus: Megalorchestia
- Species: M. pugettensis

Binomial name
- Megalorchestia pugettensis (Dana, 1853)

Synonyms
- Orchestia pugettensis Dana, 1853; Orchestoidea pugettensis Dana, 1853; Talorchestia tridentata Stebbing, 1899

= Megalorchestia pugettensis =

Species of crustacean

Megalorchestia pugettensis is a species of sand-hopper in the family Talitridae.

== Taxonomy ==
Megalorchestia pugettensis was initially placed under the genus Orchestoidea. The classification had four dentate species in the southern hemisphere under Orchestoidea and five dentate in the northern hemisphere under Megalorchestia. This differentiation was proposed by Johann Friedrich von Brandt in 1851. M. pugettensis was subsequently moved to this new genus.

== Distribution and habitat ==
Megalorchestia pugettensis is found along the west coast of North America, specifically in the Pacific Northwest, British Columbia, and southern Alaska. It lives on coarse sand beaches with minimal seaweed, distinguishing it from beach fleas.
