= Cochinorchestia =

Scientific classification
- Kingdom: Animalia
- Phylum: Arthropoda
- Clade: Pancrustacea
- Class: Malacostraca
- Order: Amphipoda
- Family: Talitridae
- Genus: Cochinorchestia; Lowry & Peart, 2010

Genus of crustaceans

Cochinorchestia is a genus of amphipod belonging to the family Talitridae.

== Species ==
- Cochinorchestia lindsayae Lowry & Springthorpe, 2015
- Cochinorchestia metcalfeae Lowry & Springthorpe, 2015
- Cochinorchestia morini (Peethambaran Asari, 1998)
- Cochinorchestia morrumbene Lowry & Springthorpe, 2015
- Cochinorchestia notabilis (K.H. Barnard, 1935)
- Cochinorchestia poka Lowry & Springthorpe, 2015
- Cochinorchestia tulear Lowry & Springthorpe, 2015
