= Americorchestia longicornis =

Scientific classification
- Domain: Eukaryota
- Kingdom: Animalia
- Phylum: Arthropoda
- Class: Malacostraca
- Order: Amphipoda
- Family: Talitridae
- Genus: Americorchestia
- Species: A. longicornis

Binomial name
- Americorchestia longicornis (Say, 1818)

Species of crustacean

Americorchestia longicornis, the common Atlantic sandhopper, is a species of beach hopper in the family Talitridae.
