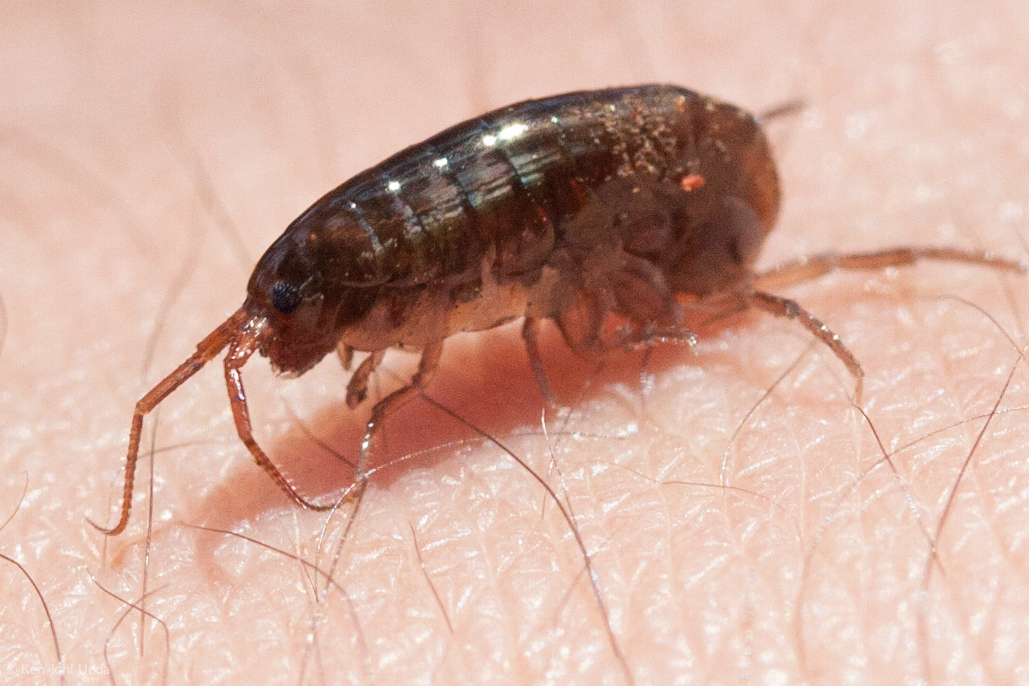

Scientific classification
- Kingdom: Animalia
- Phylum: Arthropoda
- Class: Malacostraca
- Order: Amphipoda
- Family: Talitridae
- Genus: Arcitalitrus
- Species: A. sylvaticus

Binomial name
- Arcitalitrus sylvaticus (Haswell, 1879)

Synonyms
- Talitrus sylvaticus

= Arcitalitrus sylvaticus =

Species of crustacean

Neotype site: Nurragingy Reserve'"`UNIQ--ref-00000005-QINU`"'

Arcitalitrus sylvaticus, known generally as the lawn shrimp, lawn prawn or landhopper, is a species of beach hopper in the family Talitridae. It was first described in 1879 by William Aitcheson Haswell as Talitrus sylvaticus.

It is found in Australia and nearby areas of the Pacific but has been introduced to other places, like California, New Zealand, North Carolina and Florida. The first recorded instance in California was in 1967.

They die in dry conditions and drown if it is too wet. In California, especially, they are a sign of overwatering, as they will leave their homes to avoid drowning. Their main diet is decaying leaves and their density in the habitat is greater than other soil arthropods, therefore, they are significant primary decomposers of leaf litter in their habitat.
