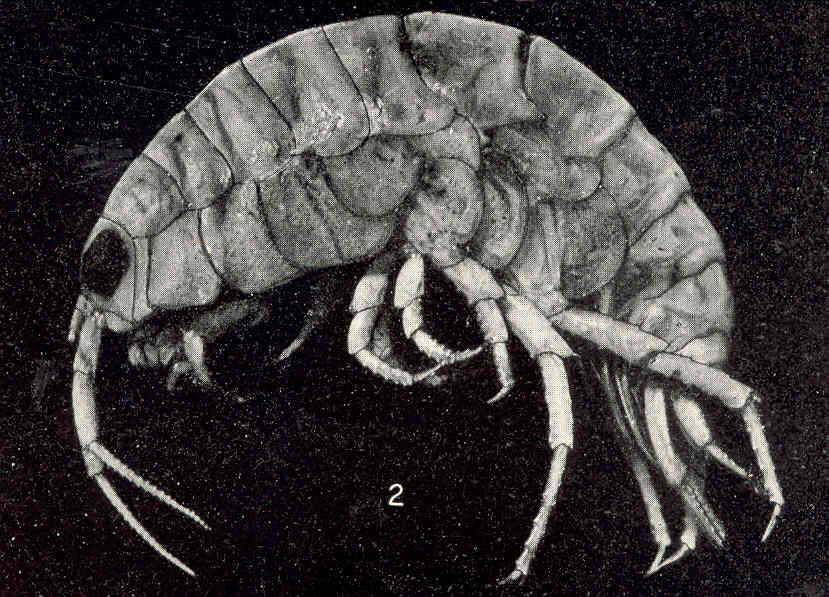

Scientific classification
- Domain: Eukaryota
- Kingdom: Animalia
- Phylum: Arthropoda
- Class: Malacostraca
- Order: Amphipoda
- Family: Talitridae
- Genus: Americorchestia
- Species: A. megalophthalma

Binomial name
- Americorchestia megalophthalma (Bate, 1862)

= Americorchestia megalophthalma =

Species of crustacean

Americorchestia megalophthalma, the northern big-eyed sandhopper, is a species of beach hopper in the family Talitridae.
