= Uhlorchestia =

Scientific classification
- Domain: Eukaryota
- Kingdom: Animalia
- Phylum: Arthropoda
- Class: Malacostraca
- Order: Amphipoda
- Family: Talitridae
- Genus: Uhlorchestia; Bousfield, 1984

Genus of crustaceans

Uhlorchestia is a genus of beach hoppers in the family Talitridae. There are at least two described species in Uhlorchestia.

== Species ==
These two species belong to the genus Uhlorchestia:

- Uhlorchestia spartinophila Bousfield & Heard, 1986
- Uhlorchestia uhleri (Shoemaker, 1930)
