= Gemini (submarine communications cable) =

Former submarine communications cable

Gemini (North/South)
- Owners: Gemini SCSL
- Landing points: 1. (United States) Charlestown, Rhode Island, US; 2. (United Kingdom) Oxwich Bay, Wales, UK; 3. (United States) Manasquan, New Jersey, US; 4. (United Kingdom) Porthcurno, England, UK
- Total length: Ca. 12600 km
- Design capacity: 60 + 55 Gb/s SDH
- Technology: Fiber optics

Gemini was a submarine communications cable system privately owned by Gemini SCSL linking the United States and the United Kingdom via parallel north and south routes.

== Cable system ==
The installation of the system was a joint venture between Cable & Wireless and WorldCom Inc. The cable system was considered operational in 1998. The cable system was approximately 12600 km combined between its north and south routes, with landing stations in Charlestown, Rhode Island; Oxwich Bay, Wales; Manasquan, New Jersey; and Porthcurno, England.

The cable was decommissioned in 2004, because the terminal transmission technology became obsolete. Portions of the cable were recovered for redeployment for the HUGO cable system. Additional pieces of the Gemini cable were reused in systems connecting Bermuda, Tortola and Jamaica to the United States.
