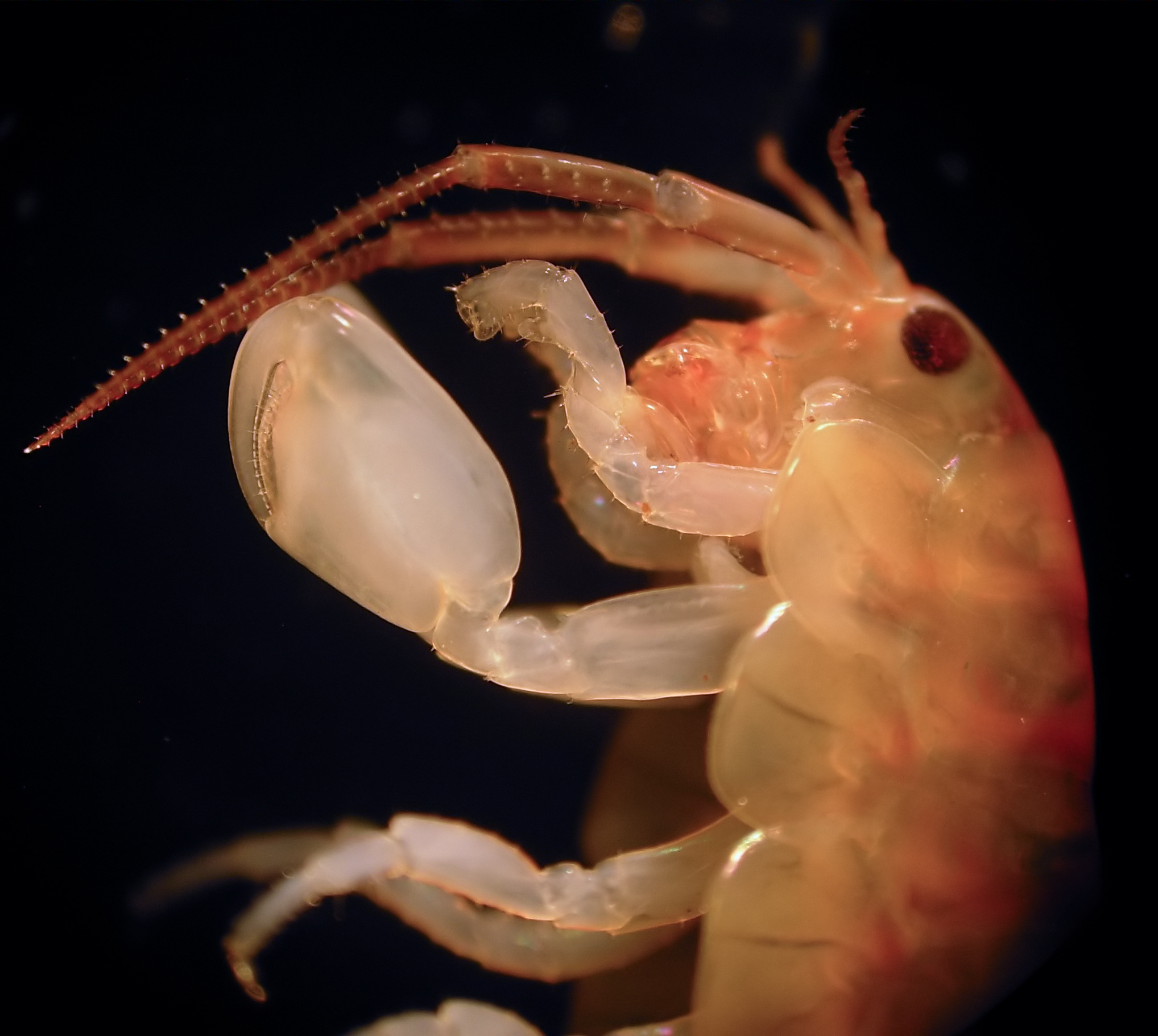
- Orchestia gammarellus

Scientific classification
- Kingdom: Animalia
- Phylum: Arthropoda
- Clade: Pancrustacea
- Class: Malacostraca
- Order: Amphipoda
- Family: Talitridae
- Genus: Orchestia; Leach, 1814

Species
- See text

= Orchestia =

Genus of crustaceans

Orchestia is a genus of amphipods in the family Talitridae. Species in Orchestia are parasitized by the Filozoan species Txikispora philomaios.

== Species ==
The genus contains the following species:

- Orchestia aestuarensis Wildish, 1987
- Orchestia aucklandiae Bate, 1862
- Orchestia bottae Milne-Edwards, 1840
- Orchestia canariensis Dahl, 1950
- Orchestia cavimana Heller, 1865
- Orchestia chevreuxi de Guerne, 1887
- Orchestia dassenensis (K. H. Barnard, 1916)
- Orchestia gambierensis Chevreux, 1908
- Orchestia gammarellus (Pallas, 1766)
- Orchestia ghigii Vecchi, 1929
- Orchestia gomeri Stock, 1989
- Orchestia grillus (Bosc, 1802)
- Orchestia guancha Stock & Boxshall, 1989
- Orchestia guernei Chevreux, 1889
- Orchestia kokuboi Uéno, 1929
- Orchestia kosswigi Ruffo, 1949
- Orchestia magnifica Vecchi, 1931
- Orchestia marquesana Stephensen, 1935
- Orchestia mateusi Afonso, 1977
- Orchestia mediterranea Costa, 1853
- Orchestia microphtalma Amanieu & Salvat, 1963
- Orchestia montagui Audouin, 1826
- Orchestia monticola Stock & Abreu, 1992
- Orchestia ponapensis J. L. Barnard, 1960
- Orchestia pyatakovi Derzhavin, 1937
- Orchestia scutigerula Dana, 1853
- Orchestia selkirki Stebbing, 1888
- Orchestia solifuga Iwasa, 1939
- Orchestia stephenseni Cecchini, 1928
- Orchestia stocki Ruffo, 1990
- Orchestia sulensoni Stebbing, 1899
