= Africorchestia =

Scientific classification
- Kingdom: Animalia
- Phylum: Arthropoda
- Clade: Pancrustacea
- Class: Malacostraca
- Order: Amphipoda
- Family: Talitridae
- Genus: Africorchestia; Lowry & Coleman, 2011

Genus of crustaceans

Africorchestia is a genus of sand-hoppers in the family Talitridae.

== Species ==
- Africorchestia fischeri (H. Milne-Edwards, 1830)
- Africorchestia quadrispinosa (K. H. Barnard, 1916)
- Africorchestia skoogi (Stebbing, 1922)
- Africorchestia spinifera (Mateus, 1962)
- Africorchestia tricornuta (Shoemaker, 1920)
