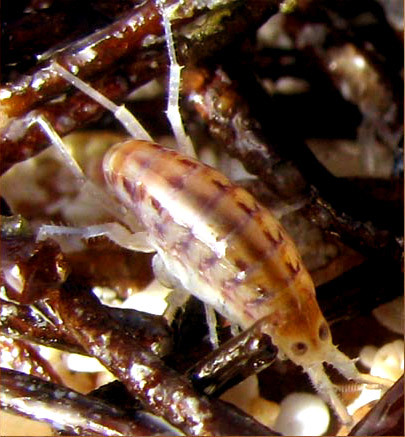
- Mexorchestia carpenteri raduloviciae

Scientific classification
- Kingdom: Animalia
- Phylum: Arthropoda
- Clade: Pancrustacea
- Class: Malacostraca
- Order: Amphipoda
- Family: Talitridae
- Genus: Mexorchestia; Wildish & LeCroy, 2014
- Species: M. carpenteri

Binomial name
- Mexorchestia carpenteri Wildish & LeCroy, 2014

= Mexorchestia =

Genus of crustaceans

Mexorchestia is a monotypic genus in the family Talitridae, members of which often are called sandhoppers or sand fleas. The only species in the genus is Mexorchestia carpenteri.

== Description ==
As with all amphipods, Mexorchestia carpenteri displays these features:

- It looks like a "shrimplike sowbug".
- It has two pairs of antennae.
- It lacks a hard back covering (carapace).
- Its eyes are not on stalks.
- Its body consists of several segments with legs, gills and other appendages.
- Its body is arched and flattened sideways.
- Its gills arise on the thorax segments, not on the abdomen.

In common with other members of the family Talitridae, Mexorchestia carpenteri is relatively large, and of its two pairs of antennae, the lower two are much longer and broader than the upper two.

While several microscopic anatomical features distinguish Mexorchestia carpenteri from similar sandhoppers in different genera, some relatively easy features to see include these:

- The eyes are notably large, constituting a third of the head length.
- The shorter top pair of antennae are about half the length of the lower pair.

== Distribution ==
The map documenting observations of Mexorchestia carpenteri on the GBIF page for the species page indicates its presence along shores of the Gulf of Mexico and the Caribbean including southern Texas and Florida in the US, perhaps as far south as Panama, and maybe as far east as Bermuda.

== Habitat ==
In the publication in which the genus and its single species and subspecies were described, the habitat is described as "sub-tropical, non-substrate modifying, wrack generalists".

The type locality of Mexorchestia carpenteri, in Florida, was in a saltmarsh behind the main beach facing the Gulf of Mexico, in a brackish pool subject to tidal changes, where the beach-hoppers sheltered under damp digging wastes. An individual illustrated on this page was one of an enormous number on Shoalgrass, Halodule wrightii, washed onto a Caribbean beach of Mexico's Yucatan Peninsula.

A study on the diversity of crustaceans in macrobenthic environments on some of Mexico's sandy beaches found that the association of Mexorchestia carpenteri raduloviciae with "... macroalgal wrack underscores the critical role of stranded algae in providing food and refuge, enhancing habitat complexity, and supporting high macrofaunal abundance." Of 3,352 organisms collected for this study, Mexorchestia carpenteri raduloviciae accounted for 66.4% of the total abundance.

== Ecology ==
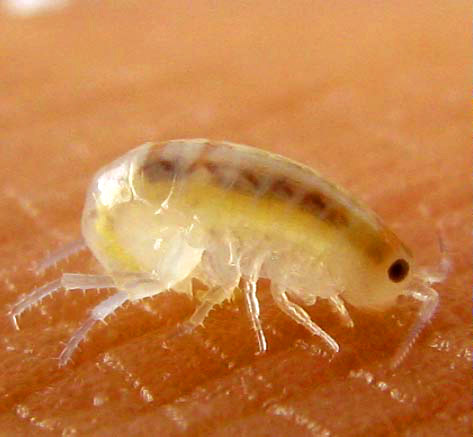
Mexorchestia carpenteri raduloviciae chewing on human skin

In the coastal environments in which Mexorchestia carpenteri occur, they are regarded as important in the trophic chain of which they are part. They serve as primary consumers by feeding on detritus and, in turn, they are part of the diet of polychaetes, mollusks, birds, and fishes, some of those being commercially important.

It's to be noted that Mexorchestia individuals are not necessarily easy food for their predators. As the observer noted when the picture at the right was taken, "... sand fleas have a shrimp-like tail they flick downward when they jump." In the picture, the bent-under rear end is ready to propel a mighty jump. The picture also shows that Mexorchestia can feed on more than detritis; it is nibbling on the skin of the citizen scientist who took the picture.

== Taxonomy ==
The genus Mexorchestia is a member of the family Talitridae, and the subfamily Platorhestiinae. The genus is closely related to the genus Tethorchestia, into which originally it was placed.

The single species in the genus, M. carpenteri, is recognized as comprising these two subspecies:

- Mexorchestia carpenteri carpenteri Wildish & Lecroy, 2014
- Mexorchestia carpenteri raduloviciae Wildish & LeCroy, 2014

The two subspecies are distinguished by these microscopic details:

- differences in size
- number of articles in the flagellum of antenna 2 (the lower, longer one)
- the number of marginal setae on oostegite 2 of the female
- the number of distal dorsolateral robust setae on the telson

== Etymology ==
In the genus name Mexorchestia, the Mex- refers to the Gulf of Mexico where the new taxon originally was found, and the -orchestia relates to the genus Orchestia, to which Mexorchestia is related.

In the subspecies name Mexorchestia carpentri raduloviciae, the raduloviciae most likely honors Dr. Adriana Radulovici, who collected talitrids in Mexico for the study upon which the erection of the genus and species was based.
