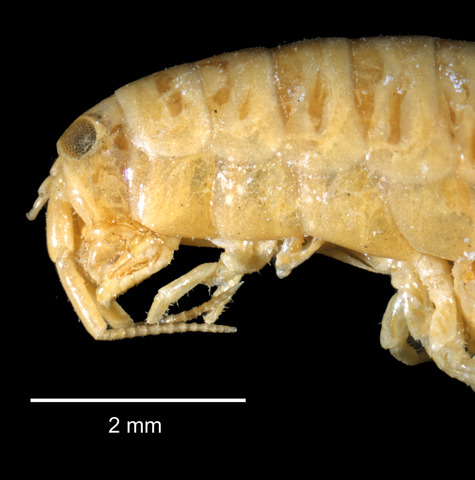
- A preserved specimen of P. platensis, the first species of the genus to be described

Scientific classification
- Domain: Eukaryota
- Kingdom: Animalia
- Phylum: Arthropoda
- Class: Malacostraca
- Order: Amphipoda
- Family: Talitridae
- Genus: Platorchestia; Bousfield, 1982

= Platorchestia =

Genus of crustaceans

Platorchestia is a genus of sand flea, containing the following species:

- Platorchestia ashmoleorum Stock, 1996
- Platorchestia bousfieldi Hou & Li, 2003
- Platorchestia chathamensis Bousfield, 1982
- Platorchestia crassicornis (Costa, 1867)
- Platorchestia dispar (Dana, 1852)
- Platorchestia humicola (Martens, 1868)
- Platorchestia japonica (Tattersall, 1922)
- Platorchestia joi Stock & Biernbaum, 1994
- Platorchestia kaalensis (J. L. Barnard, 1955)
- Platorchestia lanipo Richardson, 1991
- Platorchestia monodi Stock, 1996
- Platorchestia munmui Jo, 1988
- Platorchestia pachypus (Derzhavin, 1937)
- Platorchestia pacifica Miyamoto & Morino, 2004
- Platorchestia paraplatensis Serejo & Lowry, 2008
- Platorchestia pickeringi (Dana, 1853)
- Platorchestia platensis (Krøyer, 1845)
- Platorchestia zachsi (Derzhavin, 1937)
