= TAT-11 =

Transatlantic telephone cable

TAT-11 was AT&T Corporation's 11th transatlantic telephone cable, in operation from 1993, initially carrying 2 x 565 Mbit/s between the United States and France.

The cable ran between Manahawkin, New Jersey, United States to Saint-Hilaire-de-Riez in France and Oxwich Bay in Wales.

Its capacity was 3x565 between the US and the UK or between France and the US or between the UK and France. Its usual working configuration was 2x565 between UK - US, 1x565 between UK - France and 1x565 between US and France. The system was retired in 2004.
