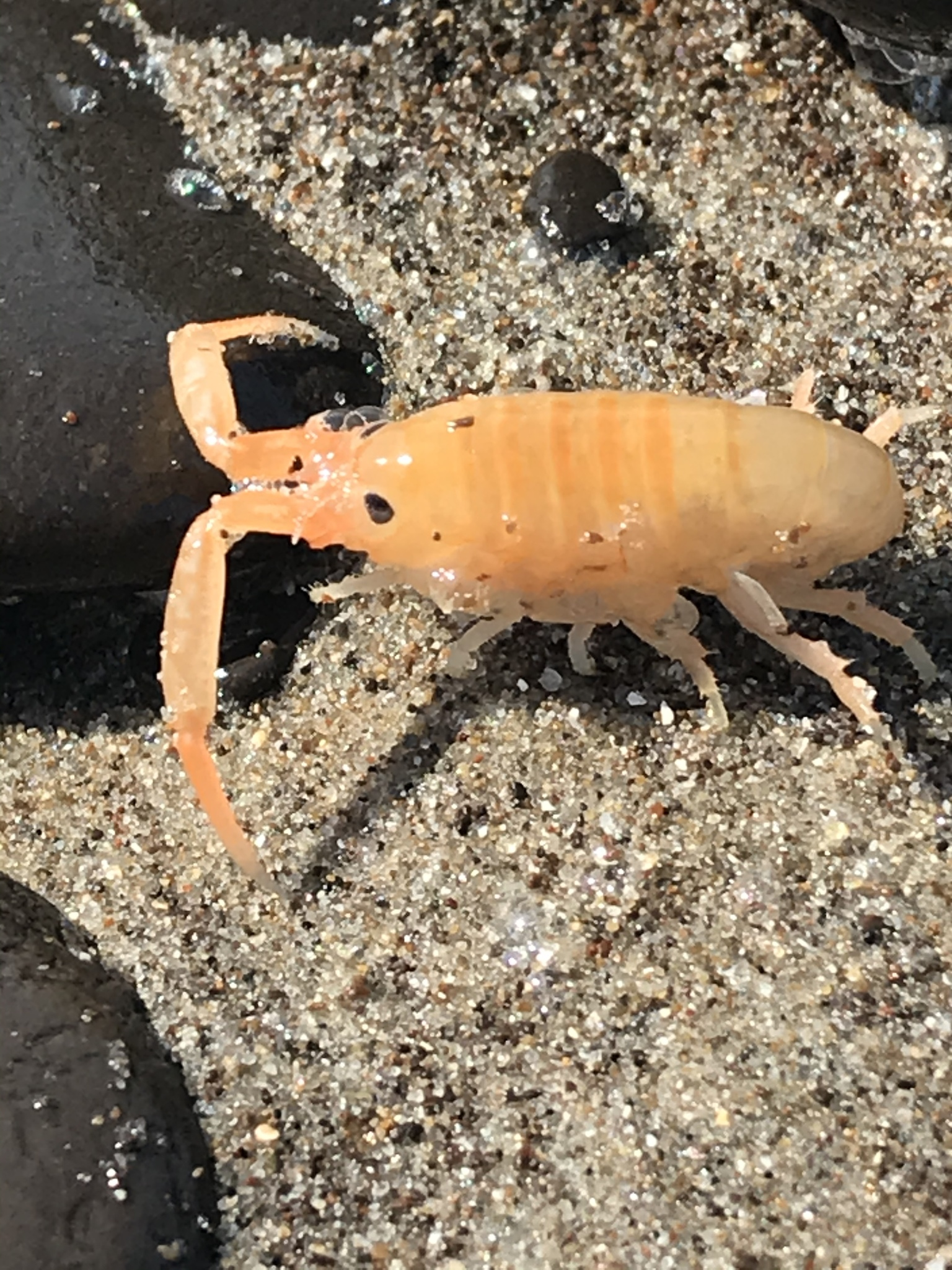

Scientific classification
- Domain: Eukaryota
- Kingdom: Animalia
- Phylum: Arthropoda
- Class: Malacostraca
- Order: Amphipoda
- Family: Talitridae
- Genus: Megalorchestia
- Species: M. corniculata

Binomial name
- Megalorchestia corniculata (Stout, 1913)

= Megalorchestia corniculata =

Species of crustacean

Megalorchestia corniculata is a species of beach hopper in the family Talitridae.

== Ecological role ==
Megalorchestia corniculata is a crucial consumer of wrack. By consuming washed-up seaweed, Megalorchestia corniculata helps process it and contributes to nutrient cycling in sandy beach ecosystems. Megalorchestia corniculata plays a vital role in breaking down organic matter like kelp, which promotes nutrient availability in intertidal environments. Consuming it and excreting ammonium enhances the nutrient cycling in sandy beaches.
