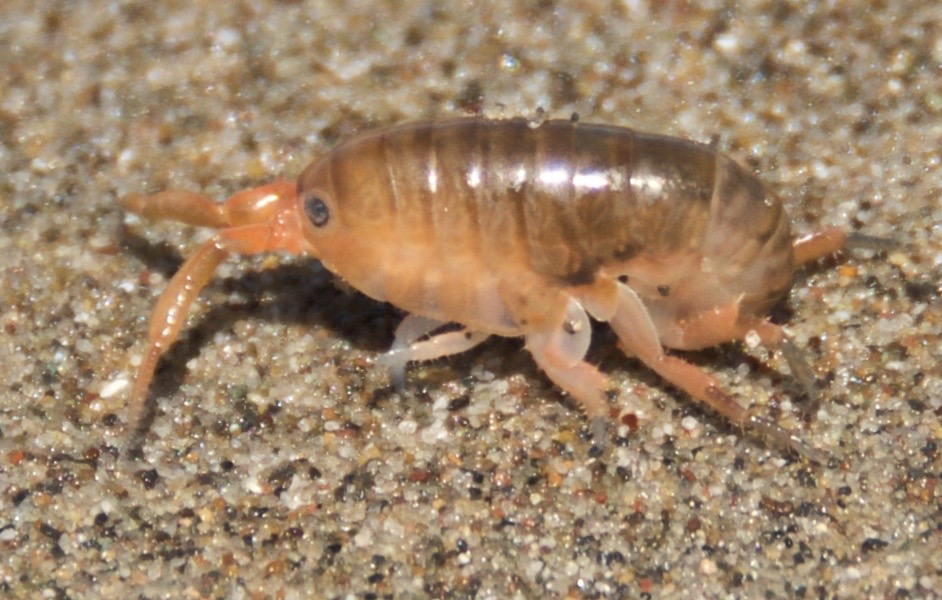
- Megalorchestia corniculata

Scientific classification
- Domain: Eukaryota
- Kingdom: Animalia
- Phylum: Arthropoda
- Class: Malacostraca
- Order: Amphipoda
- Family: Talitridae
- Genus: Megalorchestia; Brandt, 1851

= Megalorchestia =

Genus of crustaceans

Megalorchestia is a genus of sand-hoppers in the family Talitridae. The genus was erected by the German naturalist Johann Friedrich von Brandt in 1851 and the type species is Megalorchestia californiana.

== Species ==
The World Register of Marine Species includes the following species in the genus:-

- Megalorchestia benedicti (Shoemaker, 1930)
- Megalorchestia californiana Brandt, 1851
- Megalorchestia columbiana (Bousfield, 1958)
- Megalorchestia corniculata (Stout, 1913)
- Megalorchestia dexterae Bousfield, 1982
- Megalorchestia minor (Bousfield, 1957)
- Megalorchestia pugettensis (Dana, 1853)
