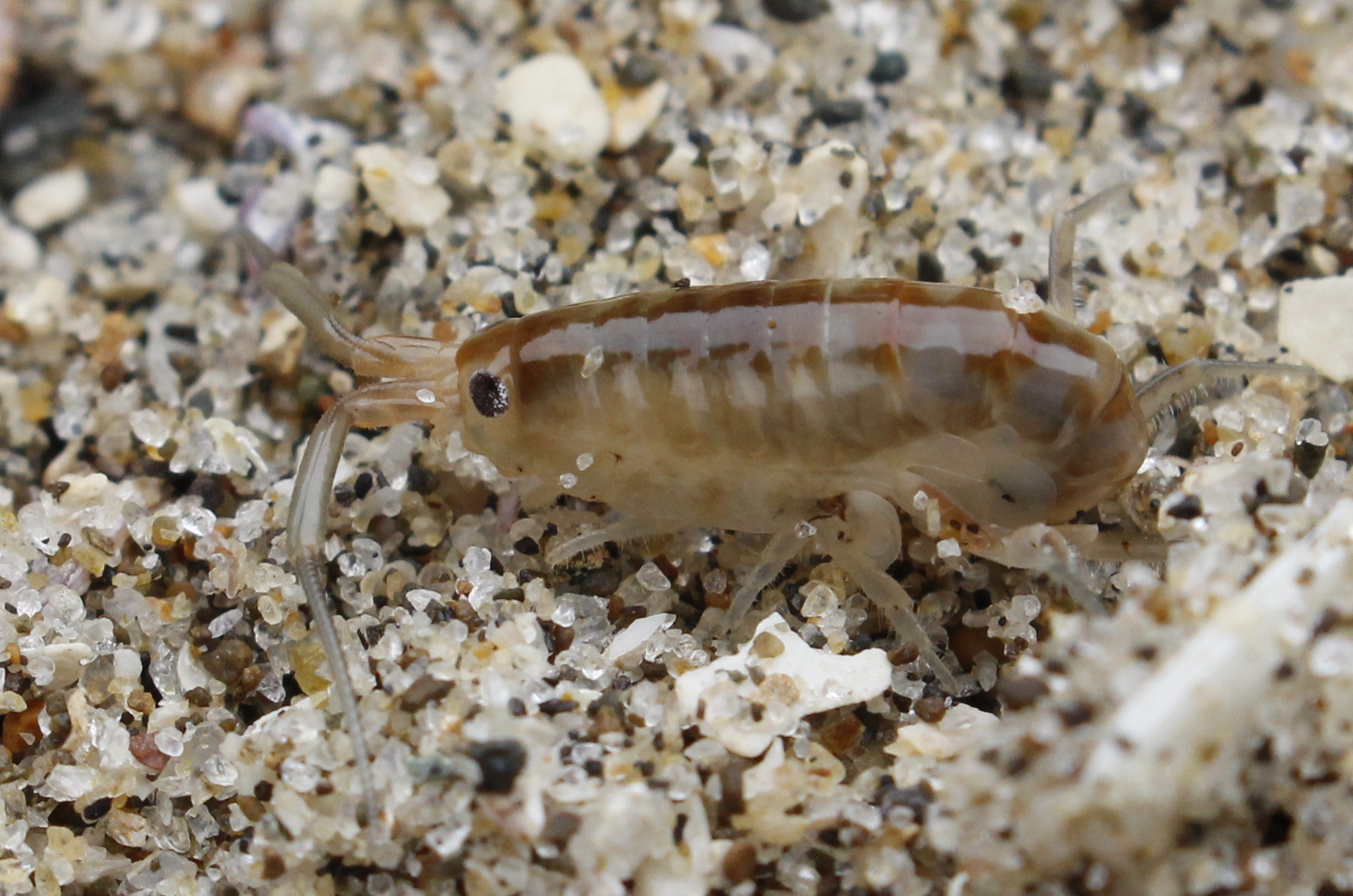
- Bellorchestia quoyana

Scientific classification
- Kingdom: Animalia
- Phylum: Arthropoda
- Clade: Pancrustacea
- Class: Malacostraca
- Order: Amphipoda
- Family: Talitridae
- Genus: Bellorchestia; Serejo & Lowry, 2008

= Bellorchestia =

Genus of crustaceans

Bellorchestia is a genus of amphipods of the family Talitridae, containing the following species:

- Bellorchestia chathamensis (Hurley, 1956)
- Bellorchestia kirki (Hurley, 1956)
- Bellorchestia marmorata (Haswell, 1880)
- Bellorchestia pravidactyla (Haswell, 1880)
- Bellorchestia quoyana (Milne-Edwards, 1840)
- Bellorchestia richardsoni Serejo & Lowry, 2008
- Bellorchestia spadix (Hurley, 1956)
- Bellorchestia tumida (Thomson, 1885)
