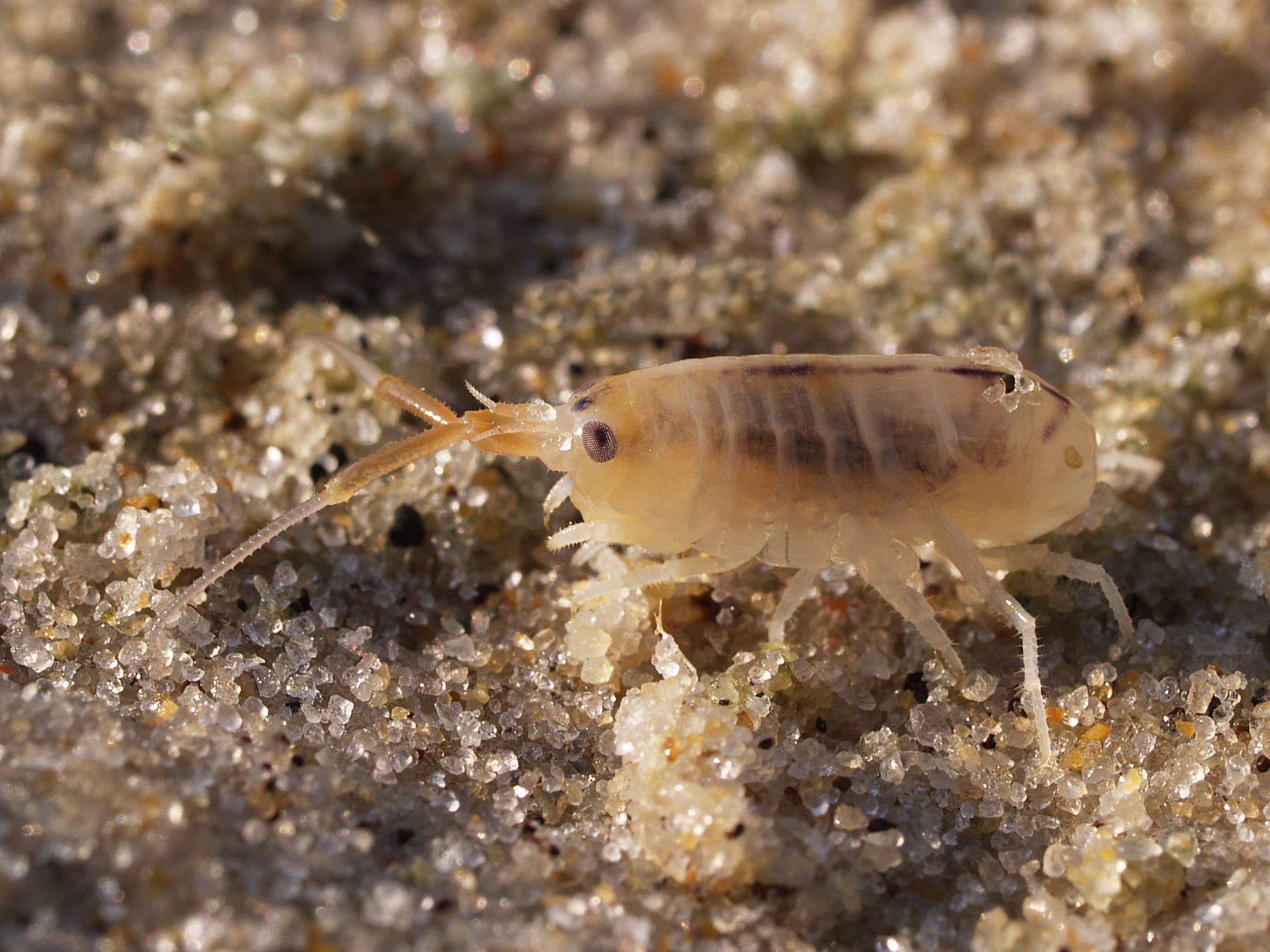
- Talitrus saltator

Scientific classification
- Kingdom: Animalia
- Phylum: Arthropoda
- Class: Malacostraca
- Order: Amphipoda
- Family: Talitridae
- Genus: Talitrus; Latreille & Bosc, 1802

Type species
- Talitrus saltator Montagu, 1808

Species
- See text

= Talitrus =

Genus of crustaceans

Talitrus is a genus of amphipod crustaceans, including the familiar European sandhopper Talitrus saltator. In includes the following species:

- Talitrus curioi Javier & Coleman, 2010
- Talitrus gulliveri Miers, 1875
- Talitrus platycheles Guerin & Cagliari, 1832
- Talitrus saltator (Montagu, 1808)
- Talitrus trukanus K. H. Barnard, 1960
