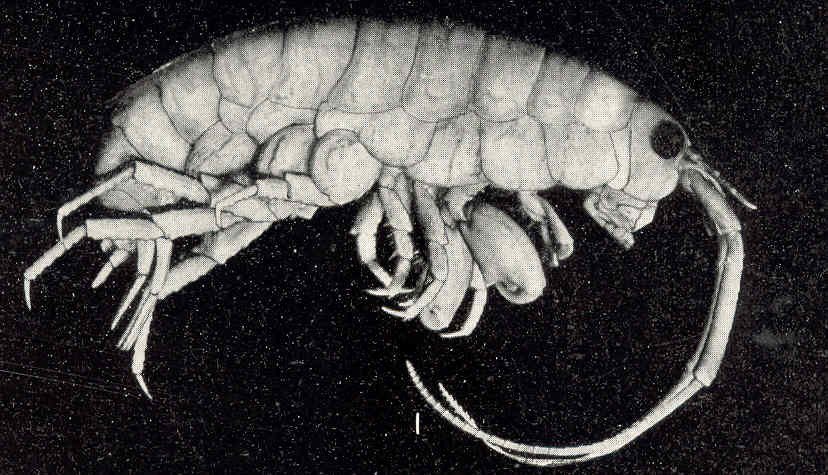

Scientific classification
- Domain: Eukaryota
- Kingdom: Animalia
- Phylum: Arthropoda
- Class: Malacostraca
- Order: Amphipoda
- Family: Talitridae
- Genus: Americorchestia; Bousfield, 1991

= Americorchestia =

Genus of crustaceans

Americorchestia is a genus of beach hoppers in the family Talitridae. There are about five described species in Americorchestia.

== Species ==
These five species belong to the genus Americorchestia:

- Americorchestia barbarae Bousfield, 1991
- Americorchestia heardi Bousfield, 1991
- Americorchestia longicornis (Say, 1818) (common Atlantic sandhopper)
- Americorchestia megalophthalma (Bate, 1862) (northern big-eyed sandhopper)
- Americorchestia salomani Bousfield, 1991
