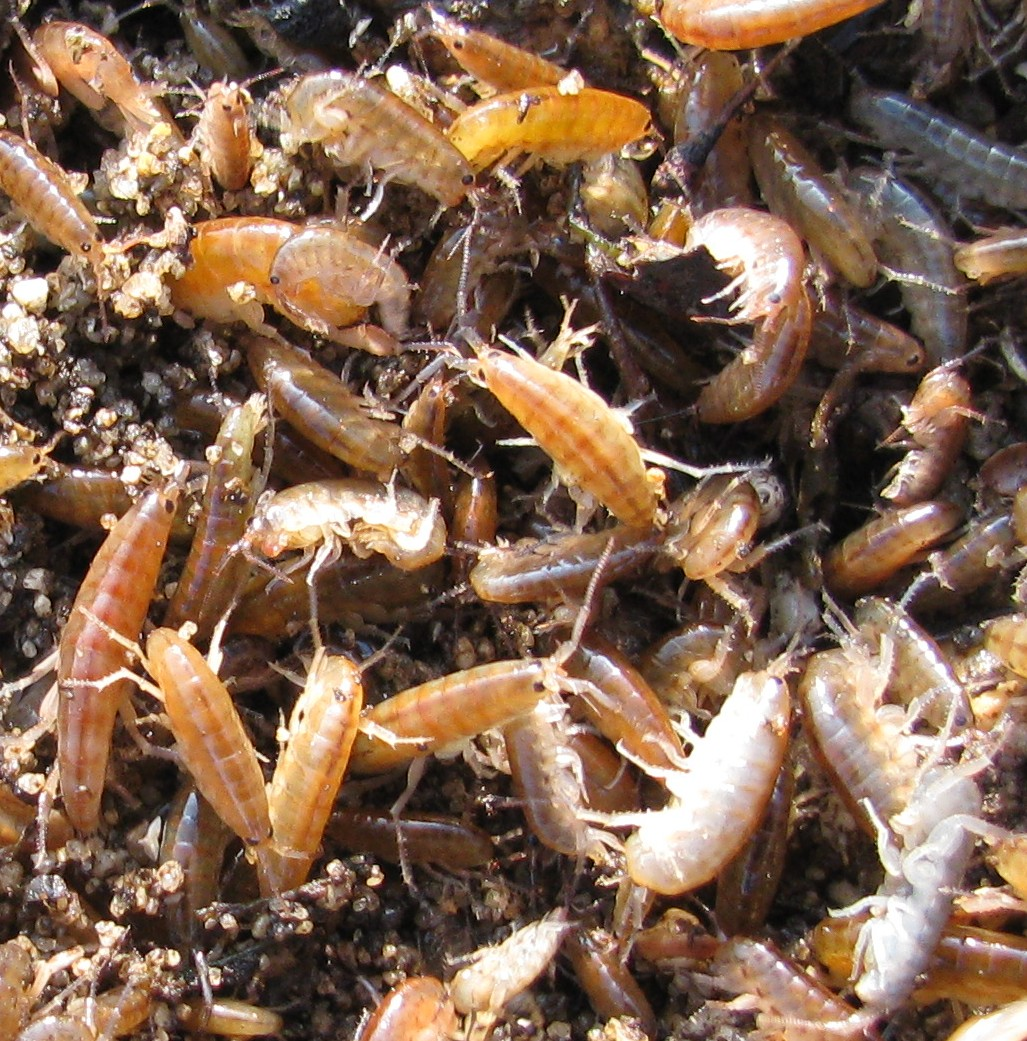

Scientific classification
- Kingdom: Animalia
- Phylum: Arthropoda
- Clade: Pancrustacea
- Class: Malacostraca
- Order: Amphipoda
- Family: Talitridae
- Genus: Orchestia
- Species: O. gammarellus

Binomial name
- Orchestia gammarellus (Pallas, 1766)

Synonyms
- Orchestia gammarella Pallas, 1766; Orchestia littorea

= Orchestia gammarellus =

Species of crustacean

Orchestia gammarellus is a species of amphipod in the family Talitridae.

== Description ==
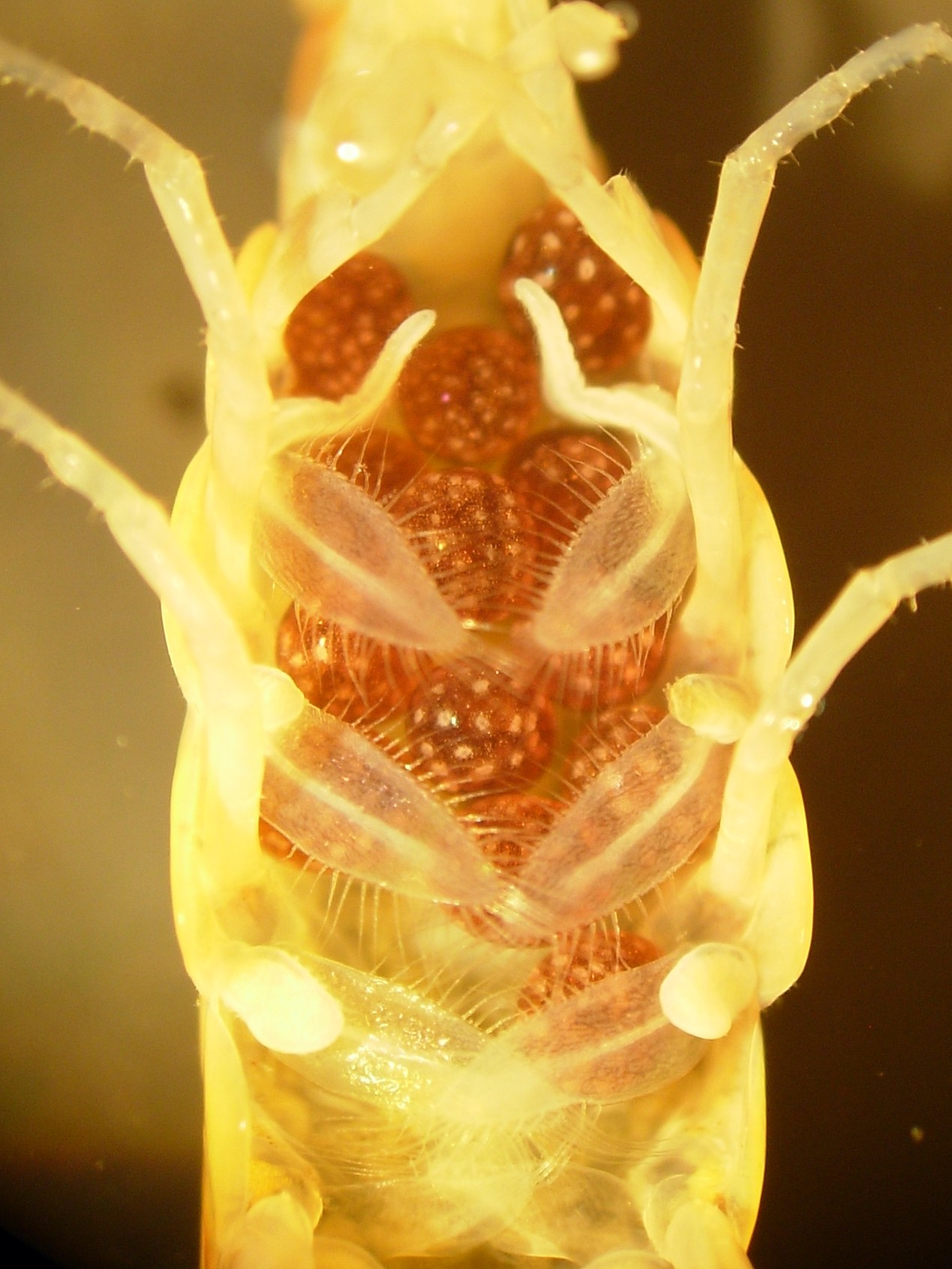
A female specimen with eggs protected by oostegites

This species grows to a maximum length of 1.8 cm and is brown or greenish brown in colour. It has a layer of pores that it secretes wax through to prevent desiccation.

== Distribution ==
Orchestia gammarellus is widely distributed from Norway and Iceland in the north, in coastal waters of European countries, and down to southwest Africa. It also occurs in the Mediterranean Sea and Black Sea.

== Habitat ==
This amphipod lives in a wide range of habitats, occurring in marine environments such as shallow waters, the intertidal zone, and in estuaries. It also lives in semi-terrestrial areas away from water, provided those areas are damp enough. It can be commonly found on shingle shores, under decaying debris concentrated around the high water mark.

== Role in plastic pollution ==
A study by the University of Plymouth found that organisms such as O. gammarellus may contribute to the production of secondary microplastics. The creatures can shred discarded plastic bags of various sorts into around 1.75 million microscopic fragments. In the presence of a biofilm, this activity increased fourfold.
