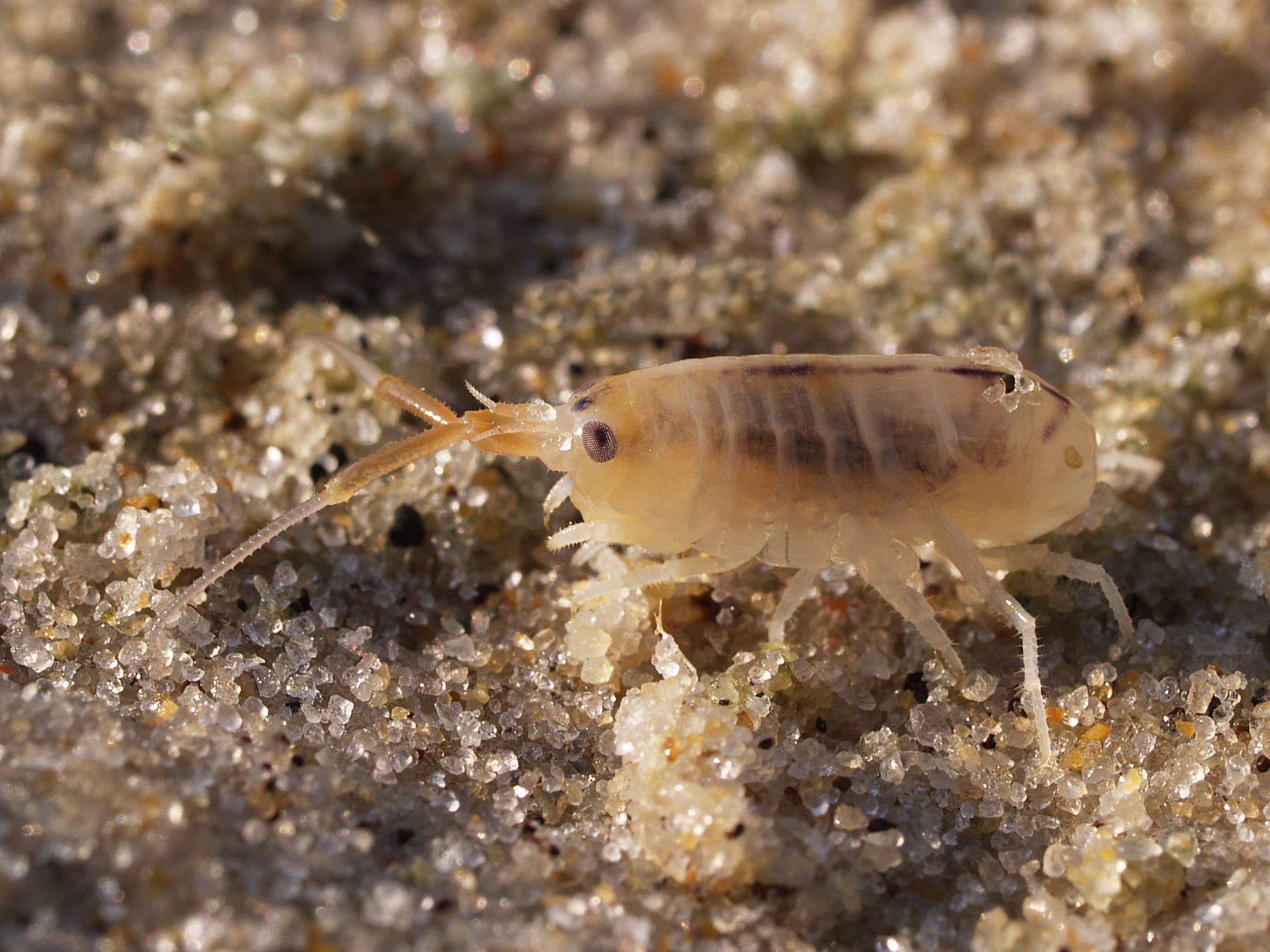

Scientific classification
- Kingdom: Animalia
- Phylum: Arthropoda
- Clade: Pancrustacea
- Class: Malacostraca
- Order: Amphipoda
- Family: Talitridae
- Genus: Talitrus
- Species: T. saltator

Binomial name
- Talitrus saltator (Montagu, 1808)

Synonyms
- Talitrus locusta Sars, 1890

= Talitrus saltator =

Species of crustacean

Talitrus saltator, a species of sand hopper, is a common amphipod crustacean of sandy coasts around Europe. The animal's typical "hopping" movement gives it its common name, and is produced by a flexion of the abdomen. In order to do this, it must stand on its legs (amphipods usually rest on their sides) and suddenly extend its abdomen from under its body. It can thus leap several inches into the air, although without any control over its direction. A great deal of scientific research has been carried out on the animal, to determine the environmental cues which it uses to control its behavior.

== Description ==
T. saltator reaches lengths between 8.2 millimetres (0.32 in) and 16.5 mm (0.65 in), with males being slightly larger than females. The body is grayish-brown or grayish-green in colour, with a single pair of black eyes. It has a distinct pair of antennae, with one antenna being more robust than the other.

== Distribution ==
T. saltator is found around the coasts of the North Sea and north-east Atlantic Ocean from southern Norway to the Mediterranean Sea. In most of its range, its daily cycle is strongly linked to the tides, with daily migrations of up to 100 metres (330 ft), but where there are no significant tides (as in parts of the Mediterranean), visual cues are used instead.

== Life cycle ==
Mating occurs in T. saltator once the photoperiod exceeds 14 hours; this is in contrast to other shoreline animals such as isopods which use air temperature or sea temperature to control breeding times. Mating occurs during the animal's nightly migration down the beach, after the female has moulted. Broods of 13–15 eggs are carried by the females. When they first hatch, juveniles are sensitive to desiccation but are unable to burrow, and so they live in washed up seaweed with a humidity of 85%–90%. Although the juveniles become sexually differentiated within a few months, they do not contribute to the second reproductive wave later in the year, but first reproduce the following year. Females die before the males, in their second winter (males live for 21 months, compared to 18 months for females). During the winter, adults burrow into the sand until they reach a moisture content of 2%; this may require them to dig up to 50 centimetres (20 in) deep.

== Ecology ==
Talitrus saltator spends the day buried at depths of 10–30 cm (3.9–11.8 in) above the strandline, but emerges at night on the falling tide to feed. They are capable of navigating where the sea is using multiple indicators; including the angle of the sun, moon, or even by detecting the blue wavelengths of light from the sea and the red-brown colors of land. Their diet is composed chiefly of the rotting seaweed which accumulates on the strandline. T. saltator is an important food source for shore birds.
