= Talorchestia =

Scientific classification
- Kingdom: Animalia
- Phylum: Arthropoda
- Clade: Pancrustacea
- Class: Malacostraca
- Order: Amphipoda
- Family: Talitridae
- Genus: Talorchestia; Dana, 1852

Genus of crustaceans

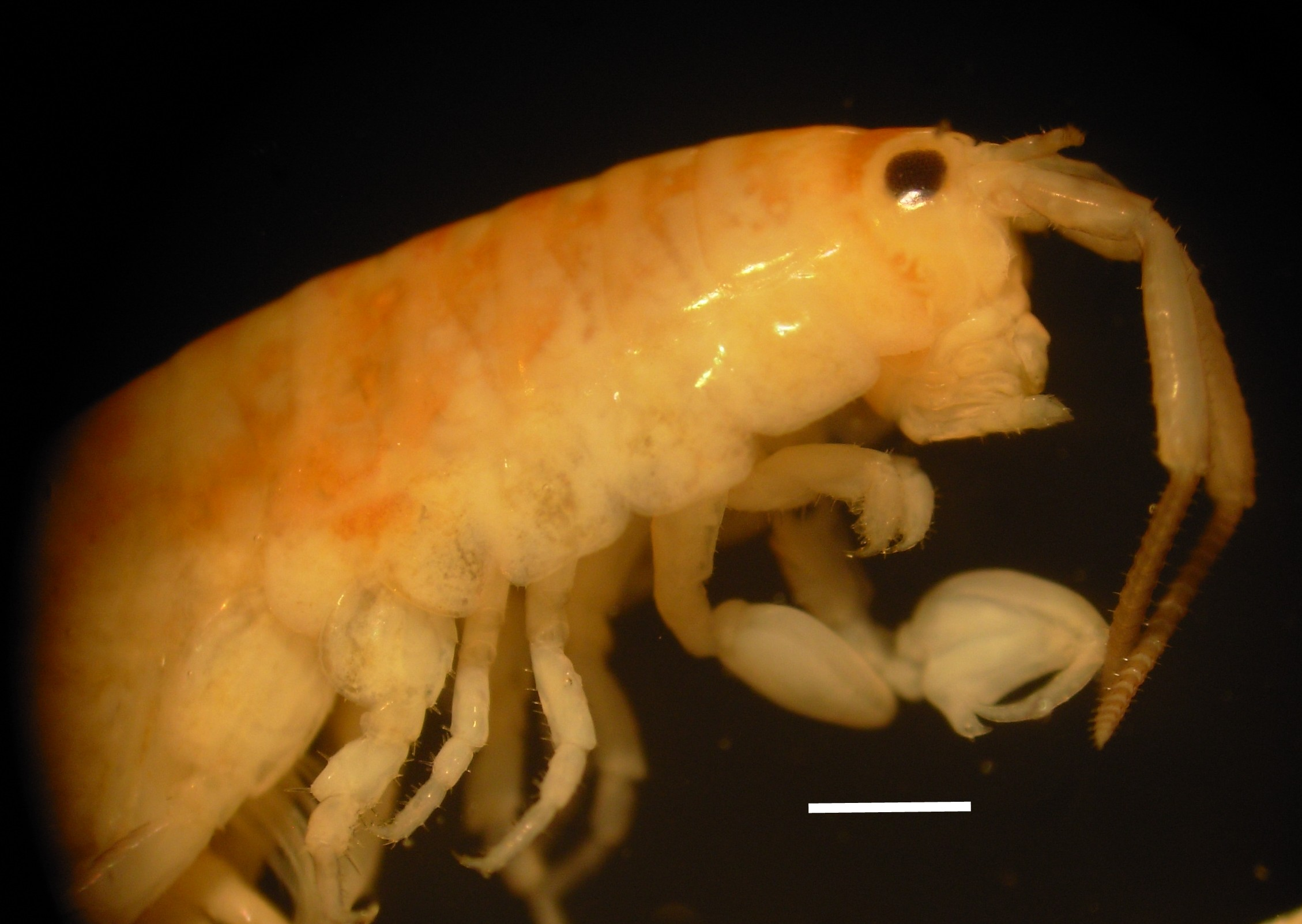
Talorchestia deshayesii = Deshayesorchestia deshayesii (Audouin, 1826), anterior part of animal

Talorchestia is a genus of amphipod of the family Talitridae, containing the following species:

- Talorchestia affinis Maccagno, 1936
- Talorchestia africana Bate, 1862
- Talorchestia antennulata Chevreux, 1915
- Talorchestia australis K. H. Barnard, 1916
- Talorchestia brito S.C. Gonçalves, 2003
- Talorchestia brucei Lowry & Springthorpe, 2009
- Talorchestia capensis (Dana, 1853)
- Talorchestia cookii Filhol, 1885
- Talorchestia dentata (Filhol, 1885)
- Talorchestia diemenensis Haswell, 1879
- Talorchestia fisheri (Milne-Edwards, 1830)
- Talorchestia franchetti Maccagno, 1936
- Talorchestia fritzi Stebbing, 1903
- Talorchestia gracilis (Dana, 1852)
- Talorchestia inaequalipes K. H. Barnard, 1951
- Talorchestia kempi Tattersall, 1914
- Talorchestia landanae Schellenberg, 1925
- Talorchestia marcuzzi Ruffo, 1950
- Talorchestia margaritae Stephensen, 1948
- Talorchestia martensii (Weber, 1892)
- Talorchestia mindorensis Oleröd, 1970
- Talorchestia morinoi Othman & Azman, 2007
- Talorchestia palawanensis Morino & Miyamoto, 1988
- Talorchestia pollicifera Stimpson, 1855
- Talorchestia quadrimana (Dana, 1852)
- Talorchestia quadrispinosa (K. H. Barnard, 1916)
- Talorchestia rectimana (Dana, 1852)
- Talorchestia skoogi stebbing, 1922
- Talorchestia spinifera (Mateus, 1962)
- Talorchestia spinipalma (Dana, 1853)
- Talorchestia sulensoni (Stebbing, 1899)
- Talorchestia telluris (Bate, 1862)
- Talorchestia terraereginae Haswell, 1880
- Talorchestia tricornuta Shoemaker, 1920
- Talorchestia tucurauna (Müller, 1864)
- Talorchestia ugolinii Bellan-Santini & Ruffo, 1991
