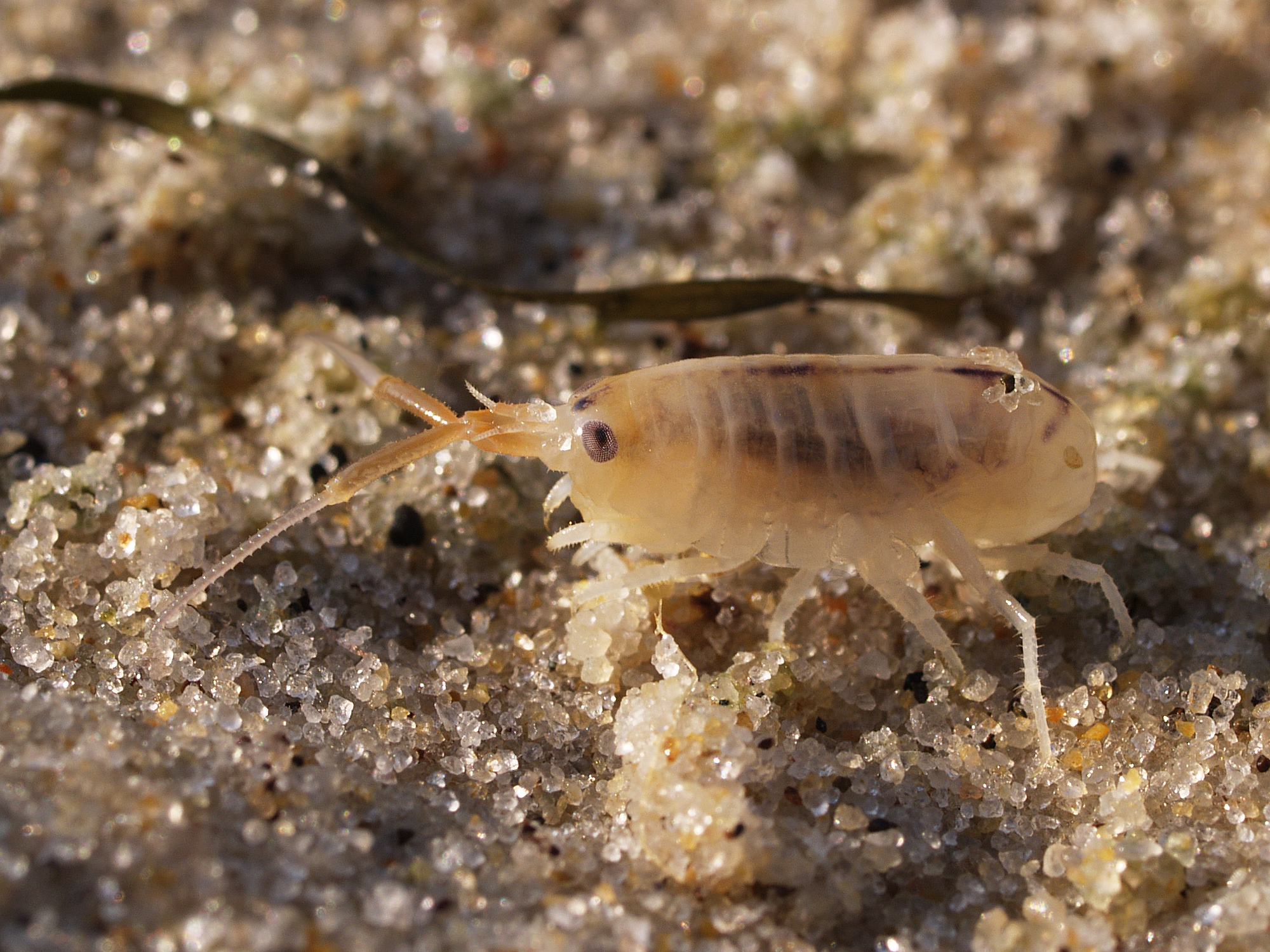
- Talitrus saltator

Scientific classification
- Kingdom: Animalia
- Phylum: Arthropoda
- Clade: Pancrustacea
- Class: Malacostraca
- Order: Amphipoda
- Superfamily: Talitroidea
- Family: Talitridae; Rafinesque, 1815

= Talitridae =

Family of amphipoda

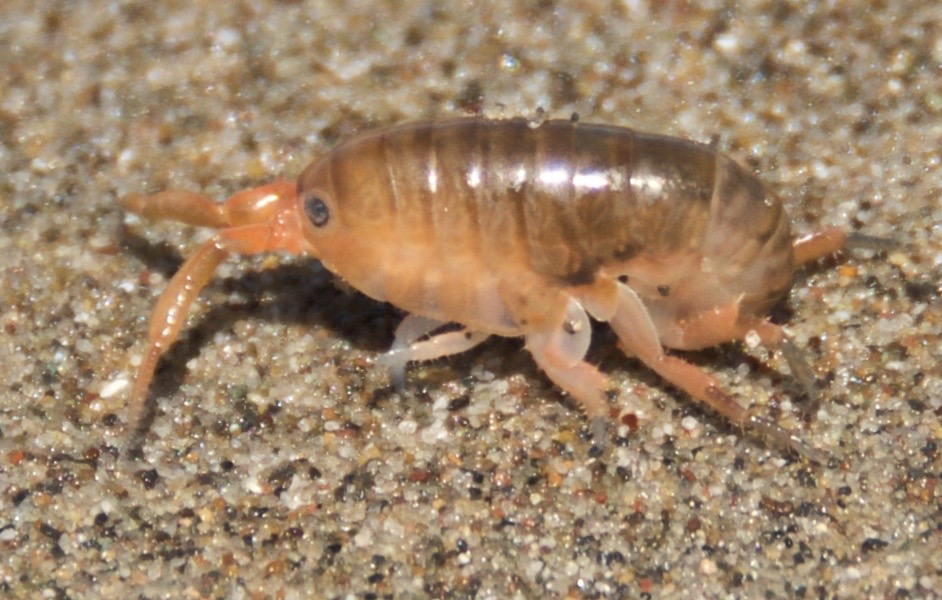
Megalorchestia corniculata

Talitridae is a family of amphipods. Terrestrial species are often referred to as landhoppers and beach dwellers are called sandhoppers or sand fleas. The name sand flea is misleading, though, because these talitrid amphipods are not siphonapterans (true fleas), do not bite people, and are not limited to sandy beaches.

Marine amphipods are often washed up in the strandline, but die rapidly on drying out. Talitrids differ in being able to survive for a long time out of water; some Southern Hemisphere species are entirely terrestrial.

It contains these genera:

- Austropacifica Lowry & Springthorpe, 2019
- Floresorchestia Bousfield, 1984
- Gazia Lowry & Springthorpe, 2019
- Americorchestia Bousfield, 1991
- Asiaorchestia Lowry & Myers, 2019
- Britorchestia Lowry & Bopiah, 2012
- Persianorchestia Momtazi, Lowry & Hekmatara, 2017
- Pseudorchestoidea Bousfield, 1982
- Sardorchestia Ruffo in Tafani, Ugolini, Bazzicalupo, Mengoni & Ruffo, 2004
- Africorchestia Lowry & Coleman, 2011
- Amphiatlantica Lowry & Myers, 2019
- Aokiorchestia Morino, 2020
- Atlantorchestoidea Serejo, 2004
- Australorchestia Serejo & Lowry, 2008
- Bellorchestia Serejo & Lowry, 2008
- Bulychevia Lowry & Myers, 2019
- †Caecorchestia Hegna & Lazo-Wasem in Hegna, Lazo-Wasem, Serrano-Sánchez & Barragán, 2020
- Canariorchestia Lowry & Myers, 2019
- Capeorchestia Lowry & Baldanzi, 2016
- Cariborchestia Smith, 1998
- Chelorchestia Bousfield, 1984
- Chevreuxiana Lowry & Myers, 2019
- Chroestia Marsden & Fenwick, 1984
- Clippertonia Lowry & Myers, 2019
- Cryptorchestia Lowry & Fanini, 2013
- Dallwitzia Lowry & Myers, 2019
- Defeo Lowry & Myers, 2019
- Derzhavinia Lowry & Myers, 2019
- Deshayesorchestia Ruffo, 2004
- Ditmorchestia Morino & Miyamoto, 2015
- Ezotinorchestia Morino & Miyamoto, 2016
- Galaporchestia Lowry & Myers, 2019
- Gondwanorchestia Lowry, Myers & Pérez-Schultheiss, 2020
- Hermesorchestia Hughes & Lowry, 2017
- Houlia Lowry & Myers, 2019
- Indiorchestia Lowry & Myers, 2019
- Kaalorchestia Lowry & Myers, 2019
- Kokuborchestia Morino & Miyamoto, 2015
- Laniporchestia Lowry & Myers, 2019
- Lanorchestia Miyamoto & Morino, 2010
- Leptorchestia Morino, 2020
- Lowryella Morino & Miyamoto, 2016
- Macarorchestia Stock, 1989
- Megalorchestia Brandt, 1851
- Mexorchestia Wildish & LeCroy, 2014
- Minamitalitrus White, Lowry & Morino, 2013
- Miyamotoia Morino, 2020
- Mizuhorchestia Morino, 2014
- Morinoia Lowry & Myers, 2019
- Nipponorchestia Morino & Miyamoto, 2015
- Notorchestia Serejo & Lowry, 2008
- Opunorchestia Lowry & Myers, 2019
- Orchestia Leach, 1814
- Orchestoidea Nicolet, 1849
- Paciforchestia Bousfield, 1982
- Palmorchestia Stock & Martin, 1988
- Pickorchestia Lowry & Myers, 2019
- Pictonorchestia Lowry & Springthorpe, 2021
- Platorchestia Bousfield, 1982
- Pyatakovestia Morino & Miyamoto, 2015
- Sinorchestia Miyamoto & Morino, 1999
- Speziorchestia Lowry & Myers, 2019
- Talitrus Latreille, 1802
- Talorchestia Dana, 1852
- Tethorchestia Bousfield, 1984
- Tongorchestia Lowry & Bopiah, 2013
- Transorchestia Bousfield, 1982
- Traskorchestia Bousfield, 1982
- Trinorchestia Bousfield, 1982
- Tropicorchestia Lowry & Springthorpe, 2015
- Vallorchestia Lowry, 2012
- Vietorchestia Dang & Le, 2011
- Yamatorchestia Takahashi & Morino, 2020
- Protaustrotroides Bousfield, 1984
