= List of Lulu Award winners =

Lulu Awards
- Awarded for: To celebrate the people and projects that expose comics and cartooning work by and/or about women.
- Venue: San Diego Comic-Con (1997–2007); MoCCA Festival (2008–2009); Long Beach Comic Con (2010)
- Country: United States
- Presented by: Friends of Lulu
- First award: 1997
- Final award: 2010

The Lulu Awards were a group of literary awards in the field of comics, presented by the Friends of Lulu from 1997 to 2010. The awards were intended to "recognize the people and projects that help open the eyes and minds to the amazing comic and cartooning work by and/or about women." The awards were presented at San Diego Comic-Con from 1997 to 2007, at the MoCCA Festival in 2008–2009, and the Long Beach Comic Con in 2010.

== Award categories and voting process ==
The awards were separated into five categories: Lulu of the Year, Kimberly Yale Award for Best New Talent, Volunteer of the Year Award, Women of Distinction Award, and the Women Cartoonists Hall of Fame. In 2009, two additional awards were created: the Leah Adezio Award for Best Kid-Friendly Work and Best Female Character.

Originally, award nominations and voting were limited to Friends of Lulu dues-paying members. In 2007, nominations were opened for the first time to non-members. In the Awards' penultimate year, 2009, a judges panel provided "the list of nominees," and "then the public ... [voted] for the winners in each category." The 2009 judges were Brigid Alverson, Jennifer Babcock, Abby Denson, Cheryl Lynn Eaton, Chris Eberle, Karen Green, and Robert Randle.

== Award winners and nominees ==
=== Lulu of the Year ===
The Lulu of the Year honor went to creator(s), book(s), or other projects "whose work best exemplifies Friends of Lulu’s mission." "Nominees must have published comic book, strip, or editorial cartoon work, whether self-published, company-published, or net-published."

- 1997 The Great Women Superheroes, by Trina Robbins (Kitchen Sink Press)
  - Action Girl, Sarah Dyer, editor (Slave Labor Graphics)
  - Girl Talk, Isabella Bannerman, Ann Decker, & Sabrina Jones, editors (Fantagraphics)
  - Leave It To Chance, by James Robinson & Paul Smith (comics)
  - Marilyn: The Story of a Woman, Kathryn Hyatt, (7 Stories Press)
  - Strangers in Paradise, Terry Moore (Homage Comics)
- 1998 Action Girl, Sarah Dyer, editor (Slave Labor Graphics)
  - Abby Denson, Tough Love: High School Confidential, Freedom Set, and work in XY Magazine
  - Linda Medley, Castle Waiting (Olio)
  - Dave Roman and John Green, Quicken Forbidden
  - Jill Thompson, Scary Godmother (Sirius Entertainment)
- 1999 Scary Godmother, by Jill Thompson (Sirius Entertainment)
  - Akiko, by Mark Crilley (Sirius Entertainment)
  - The Amazing "True" Story of a Teenage Single Mom, by Katherine Arnoldi (Hyperion Books)
  - Castle Waiting, by Linda Medley (Olio)
  - A Child's Life and Other Stories, by Phoebe Gloeckner (Frog, Ltd., an imprint of North Atlantic Books)
  - Queen of the Black Black, by Megan Kelso (Highwater)
- 2000 Trina Robbins, From Girls to Grrrlz
  - Mark Crilley Akiko
  - Ellen Forney, Monkey Food
  - Jim Ottaviani, Dignifying Science
  - Dori Seda Dori Stories, edited by Kate Kane and Don Donahue
  - Jill Thompson, Scary Godmother comics and books
- 2001 Trina Robbins, and Anne Timmons, Go-Girl!
  - Greg Beettam & Stephe Geigen-Miller Xeno's Arrow
  - Chynna Clugston-Major, Blue Monday
  - Mark Crilley, Akiko
  - Les Daniels, Wonder Woman: The Complete History
  - Roberta Gregory
  - Rachel Hartmann, Amy Unbounded
  - Lea Hernandez, Cathedral Child and Rumble Girls
  - Janet Hetherington, Eternally Yours
  - Lynn Johnston, For Better or For Worse
  - Lawrence Marvit, Sparks
  - Kevin Mason & Alex Szewczuk Sleeping Dragons
  - Scott McCloud, Reinventing Comics
  - Dave McKinnon and Terry Wiley, Sleaze Castle/Petra Etcetera
  - Linda Medley, Castle Waiting (Olio)
  - Terry Moore, Strangers in Paradise
  - Carla Speed McNeil, Finder
  - Mark Oakley, Thieves and Kings
  - Paul Pope, THB
  - Powerpuff Girls comics, various, Joan Hilty, editor
  - Dave Roman and John Green, Quicken Forbidden
  - Sequential Tart, Marcia Allas, editor, and staff
  - Posy Simmonds Gemma Bovery
  - Jeff Smith, Bone
  - Jeff Smith and Charles Vess, Rose
  - Jill Thompson, Scary Godmother
  - Andi Watson, Breakfast After Noon
  - Mary Wilshire
- 2002 Sequential Tart, Marcia Allas, editor
  - Chynna Clugston-Major, Blue Monday
  - Lea Hernandez, Cathedral Child
  - Carla Speed McNeil, Finder
  - Jill Thompson, Scary Godmother
- 2003 Free Comic Book Day (2002: inaugural year), Joe Field, organizer
  - Alison Bechdel , Dykes to Watch Out For
  - Chynna Clugston-Major, Blue Monday
  - Clamp (four female creators of manga, including Card Captor Sakura, Magic Knight Rayearth, and X/1999)
  - Jen Van Meter and Christine Norrie Hopeless Savages trade paperback
- 2004 Lea Hernandez, editor, Girlamatic.com
  - Jen Contino, Comicon.com/Pulse.com
  - Jane Irwin, Vogelein
  - Lawrence Klein, founder of the Museum of Comic and Cartoon Art
  - Marjane Satrapi, Persepolis
- 2005 Shaenon Garrity, (Girlamatic.com, the Cartoon Art Museum)
  - Devin Grayson (DC Comics)
  - Megan Kelso, Scheherazade
  - TokyoPop website (tokyopop.com)
  - Flight Anthology website (flightcomics.com)
- 2006 Scholastic/Graphix (publisher of The Baby-sitters Club, Queen Bee, Breaking Up)
  - Jen Contino (Comicon.com/Pulse, contributor)
  - Gail Simone (writer of Birds of Prey)
  - Girlamatic.com (Comics hosting website)
  - Zeus Comics/CAPE (Retailer/Comics and Pop Culture Expo)
- 2007 Abby Denson (Tough Love: High School Confidential)
  - Alison Bechdel (Fun Home, Dykes to Watch Out For)
  - Donna Barr (The Desert Peach, Stinz)
- 2008 Marjane Satrapi
  - Audra Furuichi
  - gURL Comix
  - Stephanie McMillan
  - Rutu Modan
- 2009 Danielle Corsetto for Girls with Slingshots
- 2010 Kate Beaton
  - Channel M Publishing
  - Hope Larson
  - Miss Lasko-Gross
  - Françoise Mouly
  - Mirror Mind, Tory Woollcott
  - The Road to God Knows by Von Allan
  - Katie Skelly
  - Tara Tallan
  - Raina Telgemeier
  - Jill Thompson
  - Carol Tyler

=== Women Cartoonists Hall of Fame ===
"Nominees must have published comic book, strip, or editorial cartoon work, whether self-published, company-published, or net-published. An individual cannot win more than once." In 2010, shortly before the demise of the Friends of Lulu, the Women Cartoonists Hall of Fame was renamed The Female Cartoonists and Comic Book Writers Hall of Fame.

- 1997 Marie Severin, EC and Marvel Comics
  - Marge Henderson Buell, creator of Little Lulu
  - Edwina Dumm
  - Ramona Fradon, Silver Age artist (Aquaman, Metamorpho) and Brenda Starr, Reporter comic strip
  - Dale Messick, creator, Brenda Starr, Reporter
- 1998 Dale Messick, Brenda Starr, Reporter
  - Marjorie Henderson Buell
  - Ramona Fradon
  - Lynn Johnston, For Better or For Worse
  - Trina Robbins, cartoonist; author, A Century of Women Superheroes
- 1999 Ramona Fradon
  - Marge Henderson Buell
  - Lynn Johnston
  - Trina Robbins
- 2000 Marge Henderson Buell
  - Fran Hopper, (Fiction House comics, 1940s)
  - Tarpe Mills, (Miss Fury)
  - Lily Renee (Fiction House comics, 1940s)
  - Hilda Terry, Teena
  - Rumiko Takahashi, Ranma ½, Urusei Yatsura, other manga
- 2001 (tie) Trina Robbins and Hilda Terry
  - Roberta Gregory
  - Lea Hernandez
  - Lynn Johnston
  - Lee Marrs
  - Linda Medley
  - Wendy Pini, Elfquest
  - Dorothy Woolfolk Roubicek
  - Dori Seda
  - Rumiko Takahashi
- 2002 Lynn Johnston
  - Nell Brinkley, early 20th century cartoonist/illustrator
  - Wendy Pini, Elfquest
  - Barb Rausch, Barbie
  - Dorothy Woolfolk Roubicek
  - Rumiko Takahashi
- 2003 Wendy Pini
  - Lynda Barry, Marlys and One! Hundred! Demons!
  - Barb Rausch, Vicki Valentine and Barbie
  - Dorothy Woolfolk Roubicek
  - Rumiko Takahashi
- 2004 Lynda Barry (Marlys, 100 Demons)
  - Amanda Conner, Vampirella, Soulsearchers & Co.
  - Barb Rausch
  - Dorothy Woolfolk Roubicek
  - Rumiko Takahashi
- 2005 Rumiko Takahashi
  - Nell Brinkley, The Three Graces
  - Amanda Conner
  - Phoebe Gloeckner, The Diary of a Teenage Girl
  - Donna Barr, A Fine Line Press
  - Jill Thompson, Scary Godmother, Death: At Death’s Door
- 2006 Roberta Gregory (Naughty Bits, Artistic Licentiousness)
  - Phoebe Gloeckner (The Diary of a Teenage Girl)
  - Linda Medley (Castle Waiting)
  - Rose O'Neill (creator, Kewpie dolls)
  - Jill Thompson (Scary Godmother)
  - Carol Tyler (The Job Thing, Late Bloomer)
- 2007 Colleen Doran (A Distant Soil, The Book of Lost Souls)
  - Lily Renee Phillips (The Lost World, Werewolf Hunters)
  - Donna Barr (The Desert Peach, Stinz)
- 2008 Nell Brinkley
  - Marty Links
  - Tarpe Mills
  - Louise Simonson
- 2009 Gail Simone
- 2010 Alison Bechdel
  - Carla Speed McNeil
  - Louise Simonson
  - Devin Grayson
  - Zelda Mavin Jackson aka Jackie Ormes
  - Diana Nock
  - Athena Currier
  - Roz Chast
  - Dori Seda

=== Kimberly Yale Award for Best New Talent ===
"Awarded to a woman who has worked in the comic book & comic strip industry for less than two years. The category [was] named for a comic book writer & Friends of Lulu founding member who died in 1997."

- 1997 Jessica Abel, Artbabe
  - Jen Benka, Manya
  - Ariel Bordeaux, Deep Girl
  - Kris Dresen, Manya; Action Girl
  - Jennifer Graves, Robin; Supergirl
  - Kathryn Hyatt, Marilyn: The Story of a Woman
  - Carla Speed McNeil, Finder, Shanda the Panda
  - Ursula O'Steen, Girl Talk, Pure Friction
  - Elizabeth Watasin, A-Girl, Action Girl
  - Christina Z, Witchblade
- 1998 Carla Speed McNeil, Finder
  - Jenny Gonzalez, Kronikle Komix
  - Devin Grayson, Catwoman
  - Tara Jenkins, Galaxion
  - Ariel Schrag, Definition; Potential
- 1999 Devin Grayson, Catwoman, Black Widow
  - Dawn Brown, Little Red Hot
  - Chynna Clugston-Major, "Blue Monday" in Action Girl and Oni Double Feature
  - Jane Fisher & Kirsten Petersen, WJHC
  - Rachel Hartman, Amy Unbounded
  - Ariel Schrag, Definition; Potential
  - Jen Sorensen, Slowpoke
  - Tara Tallan, Galaxion
  - Maggie Whorf, BoHoS
- 2000 Rachel Hartman (Amy Unbounded)
  - Kalah Allen (Jann of Renew)
  - Rachel Nacion, misspelled "Rachel Ancion" (Shades of Blue)
  - Suzanne Baumann, misspelled "Suzanne Bowman" (Fridge Magnet Stories)
  - Chynna Clugston-Major (Blue Monday)
  - Leela Corman, misspelled "Leelah Corman" (Flim Flam, Queen's Day)
  - Alison Williams (Sorcerer's Children)
- 2001 Anne Timmons (Go Girl)
  - Fiona Avery (No Honor, Rogue, Fionaverse)
  - Robyn Chapman (Theater of the Meek)
  - Catherine Doherty (Can of Worms)
  - Rachel Dodson (Harley Quinn)
  - Jennifer Feinberg (Little Scrowlie)
  - Shaenon K. Garrity (Narbonic)
  - Rebecca Guay (Green Lantern: 1001 Emerald Nights)
  - Gisele Lagace (Coolcatstudio.com)
  - Gail Simone (Simpsons comics)
  - Jen Sorenson
  - Elizabeth Watasin (Charm School)
- 2002 (tie) Gisele Lagace (Cool Cat Studio) and Ashley-Jane Nicolaus (writer, Haven)
  - Dorothy Gambrell (Cat and Girl, New Adventures of Death)
  - Layla Lawlor (Raven's Children)
  - Lark Pien (Stories from the Ward)
- 2003 Raina Telgemeier (Take-Out)
  - Layla Lawlor (Raven's Children)
  - Jenn Manley Lee (Dicebox)
  - Joanne Mutch (Rummblestrips)
  - Justine Shaw (Nowhere Girl)
- 2004 Lark Pien (Long Tail Kitty)
  - Sara Beeves (Girly Comic: Mockaroni & Cheese)
  - Dylan Meconis (Bite Me!)
  - Christina Weir (Skinwalker, New Mutants)
- 2005 Vera Brosgol (Flight, Hopeless Savages B-Sides)
  - Stephanie Freese (Ripped from the Headlines)
  - Dorothy Gambrell (Cat and Girl)
  - Emily Horne (www.asofterworld.com)
  - Tintin Pantoja (Sevenplains, Girlamatic.com, and MentalTentacle.com)
- 2006 Leigh Dragoon (By the Wayside)
  - Hope Larson
  - Clio Chiang, misspelled "Clio Chang"
  - Liz Prince
  - MK Reed
- 2007 Rachel Nabors (Crow Princess, Rachel the Great)
  - June Kim (12 Days)
  - Rivkah (Steady Beat)
  - Joëlle Jones (12 Reasons Why I Love Her)
- 2008 Martina Fugazzotto
  - Kiki Jones
  - Julia Wertz (The Fart Party)
- 2009 Kate Beaton, for Hark! A Vagrant
- 2010 Kathryn Immonen: Runaways
  - Von Allan: The Road To God Knows
  - Tory Woollcott: Mirror Mind
  - Diana Nock: The Intrepid Girlbot
  - Athena Currier: Action Athena
  - Lisa Hanawalt: I Want You
  - Carolyn Belefski: Curls

=== Volunteer of the Year Award ===
"Voted on by the Friends of Lulu board." Not presented at the 2010 awards.

- 2003:
  - Dave Roman (Editor, Broad Appeal)
  - Chris Kohler (webmaster)
- 2004 Charlie Boatner
- 2005 Marc Wilkofsky (New York Chapter)
- 2006 Donnie Tracey (Gotham City Limits)
- 2007:
  - MK Reed
  - Robin Enrico
- 2008 Lee Binswanger
- 2009 Marion Vitus

=== Women of Distinction Award ===
Criteria for inclusion were similar to the Women Cartoonists Hall of Fame, except that the award was open to all women in the comic book field, not just writers and artists.

- 2004 Maggie Thompson, editor, Comics Buyer's Guide
  - Carol Kalish (posthumous) former vice-president, New Product Development, Marvel Comics
  - Trina Robbins, author, historian
  - Mimi Rosenheim, editor, AIT-PlanetLar
  - Diana Schutz, editor, Dark Horse Comics
- 2005 Heidi MacDonald, editor, The Beat
  - Karen Berger, editor, DC Comics / Vertigo Comics
  - Vijaya Iyer, editor, Cartoon Books
  - Mimi Rosenheim, editor, AIT-PlanetLar
  - Diana Schutz, editor, Dark Horse Comics
- 2006 Diana Schutz (Editor, Dark Horse Comics)
  - Karen Berger (Editor, DC/Vertigo)
  - Jackie Estrada (Exhibit A Press, Administrator Eisner Awards)
  - Françoise Mouly (Art Director, The New Yorker)
  - Ronee Garcia Bougeious (Comics News Editor and columnist, PopCultureShock.com)
- 2007 Jennifer de Guzman (Editor-In-Chief, Slave Labor Graphics)
  - Joan Hilty (Editor, DC)
  - Karen Berger (senior VP, DC/Vertigo)
- 2008 Shelly Bond
  - Cindy Fournier
  - Janna Morishima
- 2009 Joanne Carter Siegel
- 2010 Lauren Sankovitch: editor, Marvel Comics
  - Amy Adams: co-proprietor of Bergen Street Comics
  - Sam (Samantha) Boswell: assisted on Von Allan's The Road To God Knows
  - Peggy Burns: Associate Publisher, Marketing & Sales, Drawn & Quarterly
  - Elizabeth Dingmann: Lerner Publishing Group publicist
  - Laura Hudson: ComicsAlliance
  - Jenette Kahn: Former Publisher, DC Comics
  - Katie Merrit: retailer, Green Brain Comics
  - Françoise Mouly: Publisher/Editorial Director, Toon Books

=== Leah Adezio Award for Best Kid-Friendly Work ===
- 2009 Shannon, Dean, and Nathan Hale, Rapunzel's Revenge
- 2010 Diana Nock: The Intrepid Girlbot
  - Jennifer L. Holm and Matthew Holm: Babymouse: The Musical and Babymouse: Dragonslayer
  - Tory Woollcott: Mirror Mind
  - Teddy Riawen, Phuong Hong Au Nguyen, and Malcolm Harris: Witch Girls Tales vol. 2, issue #1
  - David Petersen: Mouse Guard: Winter 1152
  - Roger Langridge: The Muppet Show Comic Book: The Treasure of Peg-Leg Wilson
  - Art Baltazar and Franco Aureliani: Tiny Titans

=== Best Female Character ===
- 2009 Monica Villarreal, from Wapsi Square by Paul Taylor
- 2010 Ramona Flowers: Scott Pilgrim, Bryan Lee O'Malley
  - Marie Levesque: The Road To God Knows by Von Allan
  - Creepy Carly: Creepy Carly, Carly Mizzou
  - Girlbot: The Intrepid Girlbot, Diana Nock
  - Ivy: Ivy, Sarah Oleksyk
  - Mot Fleishman: Eros Inc., Michael Jonathan
  - Hannelore Ellicott-Chatham: Questionable Content, Jeph Jacques

== See also ==
- Female comics creators
- List of literary awards honoring women
- List of 20th century women artists
