= For Better or For Worse =

Canadian comic strip

- The Patterson family, the central focus of For Better or For Worse
- Author: Lynn Johnston
- Website: www.fborfw.com
- Current status/schedule: Concluded; reruns
- Launch date: September 9, 1979
- End date: August 31, 2008 (original) July 11, 2010 (new "reruns")
- Syndicate(s): Universal Press Syndicate (1979–1997, 2004–present); United Feature Syndicate (1997–2004)
- Publisher: Andrews McMeel Publishing
- Genre(s): Humour; Family; Drama; Slice of Life

For Better or For Worse is a Canadian comic strip by Lynn Johnston that originally ran from 1979 to 2008, chronicling the lives of the Patterson family and their friends, in the town of Milborough, a fictional suburb of Toronto, Ontario. For Better or For Worse is still rerun in over 2,000 newspapers throughout Canada, the U.S., Mexico, and around 20 other countries.

== History and background ==
Johnston's strip began in September 1979 and ended its original daily black-and-white run on August 30, 2008, with a postscript epilogue (as a full-colour Sunday strip) running the next day. Starting on September 1, 2008, the strip began retelling its original story, using a mixture of straight reruns and retouched strips with altered dialogue. This new format was dropped after less than two years, and in July 2010, the strip switched entirely to reruns (with some minor alterations). The strips seen in papers in 2016 were from 1987.

A signature element of For Better or For Worse during its original run was that the characters aged in real time. The strip's title is a reference to the marriage service found in the Anglican Book of Common Prayer as well as in the wedding ceremonies of other faith traditions:

...to have and to hold from this day forward, for better for worse, for richer for poorer, in sickness and in health...

Johnston's work on the comic strip earned her a Reuben Award in 1985 and made her a nominated finalist for a Pulitzer Prize in editorial cartooning in 1994. The strip led the Friends of Lulu to add Johnston to the Women Cartoonists Hall of Fame in 2002. The same year, Will Eisner called For Better or For Worse "the best strip around", saying, "It's humane, human, it has humor to it, and good artwork."

== Characters ==
=== Original characters ===
The strip focuses on a family, the Pattersons:

- Elly Patterson (née Richards) is a stressed yet loving wife and mother of three. Elly tried night classes, writing columns for a small local paper, and periodically filling in as a dental assistant in John's office before landing a job in a library. Nearing menopause, Elly was surprised to learn she was pregnant with April. After the library job ended, Elly began working in a bookstore that she and John eventually bought and expanded to include toys and hobby supplies (such as model railroads). She then sold the store to her friend and began retirement.
- John Patterson is the husband of the strip's protagonist Elly. A mild-mannered dentist and loyal family man who is a big kid at heart. Over time he develops interests in cars and model railroads, even going so far as to try and run them through the house and back to his workshop.
- Michael Patterson started in the strip as a rambunctious preschooler, then grew into a sullen teenager and a mature young man. Michael became a freelance writer, married his childhood crush Deanna Sobinski, and is a father to Meredith and Robin.
- Elizabeth Patterson started in the strip as a bratty and demanding toddler, then grew into a cute little girl, an awkward preadolescent, and a confident, bright young woman. When the strip ends, she is a teacher who has just married her ex-boyfriend Anthony Caine and become stepmother to his daughter, Françoise. Elizabeth gave birth to a son, James Allen Caine, whom she and her husband named in honour of her grandfather.

In 1991, a third child was born:

- April Patterson is the youngest, so named because she was born on April Fool's Day, 1991. She nearly drowned during a spring flood when she was four years old: the family sheepdog, Farley, lost his life saving her. She developed over the years into a bright tomboy who was a talented musician with a love of animals. When the series ends, she is about to go off to university to study veterinary medicine.

As John and Elly's children grow older, the strip starts to focus on neighbours and friends as well, creating an ever-changing roster of characters.

The comic's main characters were initially based upon Johnston's real family, but Johnston made significant changes. When her children were younger, she asked their permission before depicting events from their lives; and she only once used a "serious" story from their lives, when Michael and Josef photographed an accident before Michael realized he knew the victim. Unlike Deanna, the real-life victim did not survive. Johnston says that she dealt with the bad news of her own infertility by creating a new child (April) for the strip.

== Key storylines ==
The fictional suburban town of Milborough is near Lake Simcoe. On the For Better or For Worse website, Milborough is said to be about a 45-minute to one-hour drive from Toronto and resemble Newmarket or Etobicoke, and a location map places it on Highway 12 near Cannington and Beaverton in the northernmost part of Durham Region. The family's house is on Sharon Park Drive.

Otherwise, the Canadian aspects of the strip's setting are presented subtly in details such as the presence of institutions such as Canada Post and practices such as the family buying milk in milk bags, a common packaging in Ontario. One major exception is having Michael take his post-secondary education in London, Ontario, a midsize city 300 km west of Toronto. Johnston chose that setting considering a native of Ontario could choose it with its major educational institutions such as Fanshawe College and the University of Western Ontario, while it would allow Michael some distance from his parents yet still be within driving distance for vacations and summer breaks. Johnston also intended that story turn partially as a prank, anticipating ignorant readers assuming that Michael was studying in London, England, and enjoying imagining their embarrassment when the regional geography is explained to them. Johnston later confessed it had backfired on her and she had been fooled along with her targeted crowd when she got a congratulatory letter from Texas along with an earlier strip showing Michael in a cowboy hat, saying the Lone Star State would be a great place to tend to his education. Johnston jokingly remarked she got a taste of her own medicine and realization she did not know all regional geography, due to the other community of the same name. For their part, the citizenry of London, Ontario, welcomed their city's inclusion in the strip, including an official welcome from the University of Western Ontario when Michael switched to that institution.

In its quarter century, the strip featured various storylines, as the characters and their friends aged. These include Elly's return to the paid work force ("The Last Straw"), John's midlife crisis, the birth of a friend's six-fingered daughter ("Keep The Home Fries Burning"), Elizabeth wearing glasses ("What, Me Pregnant"), friends' divorces and relocations to distant towns, the coming out of Michael's best friend Lawrence Poirier ("There Goes My Baby"), child abuse (by Gordon's alcoholic parents), the death of Elly's mother Marian Richards ("Sunshine and Shadow"), and Elizabeth's experience with sexual harassment and assault by a co-worker ("Home Sweat Home").

The strip has a multiracial cast intended to reflect Canada's demographics. While the Pattersons are a white English-speaking family, there have been recurring characters of diverse backgrounds, including African-Caribbean, Asian, Latin American, Franco-Ontarian and First Nations ethnicities. Elizabeth's favourite high school teacher, who inspired her to study education herself, was paraplegic.

Other issues are also addressed. During her second year at college, Elizabeth moves in with her boyfriend, Eric Chamberlain, but promises not to cohabit. Elizabeth later breaks up with Eric when she finds out he is cheating on her. The Pattersons deal with difficult acquaintances such as Thérèse, the ex-wife of Elizabeth's friend Anthony, who resents Elizabeth's presence, or the helicopter parenting of Deanna's mother, Mira Sobinski.

=== Farley's death ===
Since the comic happens in real time, the Pattersons' first Old English Sheepdog, Farley, begins to get old. When he is 14 years old (April 18, 1995), Farley saves four-year-old April from drowning in a stream near the Patterson home. Farley cannot take the shock of the cold water or the exertion of saving April and dies of a heart attack after getting April to shore.

The death provoked a lot of reaction from fans. "People's emotions were kind of raw," Johnston said. "I received 2,500 letters, about one-third negative. I didn't expect the response to be so great. The letters were open and emotional and honest and personal, full of stories and love."

When Johnston told fellow cartoonist (and close friend) Charles M. Schulz that Farley was going to die, Schulz jokingly "threatened to have Snoopy hit by a truck if Johnston went through with the plan". In the end, Johnston kept the timing of Farley's death a secret from Schulz.

For Better or For Worse's website has a section dedicated to Farley that includes the strips depicting his heroism and death, plus a selection of "Farley's Spirit" strips. Farley was named after Canadian author Farley Mowat, a longtime friend of Johnston.

Johnston has allowed the Ontario Veterinary Medical Association (OVMA) to use Farley's name and likeness for the "Farley Foundation", a charity it established to subsidize the cost of veterinary care for pets of low-income seniors and people with disabilities in Ontario.

=== Lawrence comes out ===
Panel showing the coming out of Lawrence to his mother

Michael Boncoeur, a friend of Johnston's, was murdered in Toronto in 1991. Although the murder was not due to Boncoeur's homosexuality, there were some homophobic attitudes in the media coverage of it, and Johnston felt that a gay character should be brought into the strip to help combat anti-gay stereotypes and discrimination.

In April 1993, Lawrence Poirier's coming out generated controversy, with readers opposed to homosexuality threatening to cancel newspaper subscriptions. Johnston also received supportive mail, generally from social workers and politicians, who praised her for her realism and avoiding vulgarity. Readers who believed a gay character was inappropriate for a family-oriented strip wrote Johnston many letters. While a few were vicious, Johnston said that many who opposed the story arc did so poignantly. She said one that was particularly hurtful was from a longtime fan who said she felt it was against her conscience to continue reading the strip; the woman's letter had no foul remarks, but the envelope contained returned yellowed FBoFW strips the fan had kept on her refrigerator. Over 100 newspapers (including New Hampshire's Union Leader) ran replacement strips during this part of the story or cancelled the comic altogether. Much more favourable was the article "Coming Out in the Comic Strips", by David Applegate, editor of the Comic & Fantasy Art Amateur Press Association, which ran in Hogan's Alley No. 1. The next year, Lawrence introduced his boyfriend, giving rise to another, though smaller, uproar.

Explaining her decision to have Lawrence come out as gay, Johnston said that she had found the character, one of Michael's closest friends, gradually "harder and harder to bring... into the picture". Since the Pattersons are an average family in an average neighbourhood, she felt it only natural to introduce this element in Lawrence's character and have the characters deal with it. After two years of development, Johnston contacted her editor, Lee Salem. Salem advised Johnston to send the strips well ahead of time so that he could review the plot and suggest any necessary changes. So long as there was no overt or licentious material, and Johnston was fully aware of what she was doing, Universal Press would support the action. Johnston's personal reflections on Lawrence, an excerpt from the comic collection It's the Thought That Counts..., are included on the strip's official webpage.

One result of the storyline was that Johnston was a jury-selected "nominated finalist" for the Pulitzer Prize for Editorial Cartooning in 1994. The Pulitzer board said the strip "sensitively depicted a youth's disclosure of his homosexuality and its effect on his family and friends."

The story goes that Connie adopts a dog to deal with her pre-empty-nest syndrome, and as Michael and Lawrence are talking about her desire for grandchildren, Lawrence mentions that he probably will not be giving her any, and then confesses that he's in a relationship with another young man. Michael reacts in disbelief and struggles to understand. Realizing that Lawrence is not "hot for him", Michael understands Lawrence sees him as a friend, not a sexual prospect. Michael then insists that Lawrence tell his parents. Lawrence is unsure about this, saying it could be hurtful to them, which is not his intent, but Michael retorts, "it'll be a lie if you don't". Hearing the news, Connie reacts with desperate denial, then orders her husband, Greg, to speak to him. Greg throws Lawrence out of the house, challenging him to see if "his kind" will take care of him the way Connie and Greg have all these years.

In the middle of the night, Elly wakes Michael and tells him to find Lawrence (as he was the primary instigator). Connie and Greg fought for hours over Greg's banishment of Lawrence, and now Connie simply wants Lawrence back. Michael finds Lawrence at a donut shop, where they talk until dawn, and Lawrence returns home, welcomed by Connie and an apologetic Greg, who tells Lawrence that he accepts him as long as his son endeavours to be a good man, and address life afterward with "Que Sera Sera". From this, Connie decides to name the new dog "Sera". Johnston originally said she would address the issue only once, but she later wrote more story arcs about Lawrence's homosexuality.

In 2001, when Michael chose Lawrence to be best man at his wedding, Johnston ran two sets of strips. In the primary storyline, Mira Sobinski objects to having a gay man in the wedding party, while in the alternate storyline, which uses the same art but modifies the dialogue, she instead objects to the flowers that Lawrence, by this time a professional landscape architect, has given Michael and Deanna to decorate the church. The alternate storyline was for newspapers that had not published the 1993 debut of Lawrence's homosexuality.

In 2007, when asked about why she did the storyline, Johnston said:

Because it was such a good story. For me Lawrence had always been particularly [long pause] I don't know: gentle, unique, sensitive. It just seemed right – he just always appeared that way to me. Plus, I've had a number of friends who were gay, and what made me decide to do this story was that one of them [Michael Boncoeur] was murdered. Michael was a wonderful comedy writer for the CBC, and I had known him since we were in about Grade 8, and when Michael was murdered the authorities in Toronto reacted to it in a very cavalier manner – like "Well, that's one more of them off the streets." In the end, the young man who took a knife to him [following a scuffle over his bicycle] was ultimately seen as the victim. His death really prompted that story, because I wanted people to know that this young man, that you've grown up with for so many years, is still the same person. Just because his sexual orientation is suddenly different, he's still the young man who helped you in the garden, helped carry your groceries and sat with you when you cried at school.

=== Mtigwaki ===
Mtigwaki is a fictional Ojibwe community in Northern Ontario near Lake Nipigon where Elizabeth Patterson taught from 2004 to 2006. While in school, Elizabeth took a practice teaching job in Garden Village near North Bay.

The community was created with Baloney & Bannock comic creator Perry McLeod-Shabogesic, of the N'biising Nation (Anishinabek Crane Clan). McLeod-Shabogesic worked with Johnston to create an authentic world for the characters to inhabit. His son, Falcon Skye McLeod-Shabogesic, created the Mtigwaki First Nation's logo, which is inspired in part by a dreamcatcher, and his wife Laurie assisted Johnston with the Ojibwe language and was written directly into the strip as a teaching assistant in Elizabeth's classroom. Mtigwaki is shown like many Indigenous villages, with private houses, a meeting hall, a medical station and a casino.

For the strips in Mtigwaki, Johnston was awarded the Debwewin Citation for excellence in Aboriginal issues journalism by the Union of Ontario Indians in 2004.

== 2007 and 2008 changes ==
Johnston planned to retire in the fall of 2007, but in January 2007, she announced that she instead would tweak her strip's format beginning in September. Storylines would focus primarily on the second-generation family of one of the original children; scenes and artwork from older strips would be reused in new contexts; and the characters would stop aging. Johnston announced that the changes were to provide more time for travel and to accommodate health problems, including a neurological condition (dystonia) she managed with medication.

In September 2007, Johnston said she and her husband, Rod, were separated and probably would divorce, telling the Kansas City Star:

I have a new life. My husband and I have separated. I am now free to do just about anything I want to do. We still communicate. We still have children in common. It's a positive thing for both of us. And I just see so many things in the future.

Asked whether this would be a storyline in the strip, Johnston replied, "No, not a chance. I only want to live through this once." Johnston said in September 2007 that she would continue to produce new installments.

The changes in the strip over the next year were not major, although, as announced, the stories did focus more on Michael, Elizabeth and April than on Elly and John.

During the summer of 2008, Elizabeth and Anthony carry out their wedding plans, which culminate in a ceremony in late August. This occasion is marred by a crisis: Grandpa Jim has had another heart attack. Elizabeth hears about it after the ceremony and visits her grandfather and her step-grandmother, Iris, in the hospital. Jim is hanging on and responding with his post-stroke responses of "yes" and "no". In the final daily strip, Iris gives advice to Elizabeth and Anthony, who are both touched by her devotion to Jim. The strip concludes with Iris saying "It's a promise that should last a lifetime. It defines you as a person and describes your soul. It's a promise to be there, one for the other, no matter what happens, no matter who falls ... For better or for worse, my dears ... for better or for worse". This final daily strip had a message from Johnston saying, "This concludes my story ... with grateful thanks to everyone who has made this all possible. ~Lynn Johnston".

The Sunday strip on August 31, 2008, revealed what each character would do in years to come. Elly and John retire to travel, volunteer in the community, and help raise their four grandchildren. Elizabeth continues to teach. She and Anthony have a child, James Allen, presumably named in honour of his great-grandfather Jim Richards. Grandpa Jim lives to welcome the child, then dies at age 89 with Iris at his bedside. Anthony continues to manage Mayes Motors and its various related businesses, introduces Elizabeth to ballroom dancing, and hopes to open a bed-and-breakfast. Michael has four books published before signing a film contract. Deanna opens a sewing school and teaches Robin to cook. Meredith enters dance and theatre. April graduates from university with a degree in veterinary medicine. Following her love of horses, she gets a job in Calgary with the Calgary Stampede, continues to live in western Canada, and has an unnamed boyfriend there.

== Reruns ==
In the last panel of the strip's original run (August 31, 2008), along with a caricature of herself at the drawing table, Johnston thanked everyone for supporting her and concluded, "If I could do it all over again... Would I do some things differently?... I've been given the chance to find out!! Please join me on Monday as the story begins again... With new insights and new smiles. Looking back looks wonderful!"

The next day, September 1, For Better or For Worse ran as usual, but Michael was once again a small boy, asking his young mother, Elly, to get him a puppy. This began what Johnston called "new-runs", restarting her storyline with a roughly 50/50 mixture of reruns of early strips and reworkings of 1980s strips that featured the original artwork (sometimes slightly retouched) with new dialogue. The time frame appeared to be 29 years before the present day; the family is correspondingly younger. Michael looks about five or six years old, Elizabeth is a small child learning to talk, and the family is also raising a puppy.

For the next 22 months, the strip ran in this format. On July 12, 2010, without fanfare, the strip quietly switched to straight reruns of material from the 1980s. But these reruns have had slight alterations as well. The daily strips, originally inked, have been digitally colourized. In the December 31, 2012, installment, dialogue that referred to the initial date of publication (1984) was altered, so that the strip was seen to be taking place in the present day. In another slight touch-up to show a present-day timeline, when Michael invites his friends over to play on a video game console he recently got as a present, they are seen using a Wii; in the original strip a second generation video game console was played. Some strips have had altered panels, in particular those dealing with child discipline, because of increased social and cultural opposition to corporal punishment. In the original strips Michael and Elizabeth were occasionally spanked. The new strips have modified the artwork to eliminate the device of stars coming out children's bottoms denoting the aftereffect of a spanking, or in certain cases, have a new panel to change the punishment to a "time out" (being made to sit in a corner or like isolation) instead of a spanking.

This format continues, with strips being republished approximately 29 years after their initial appearance.

== Legacy ==
The strip is perhaps best known for the fact that, unlike most comic strips, it took place more or less in real time for most of its run. Michael and Elizabeth were a young child and a toddler at the strip's beginning, and by the end have grown into adults, with Michael married and raising his own children and Elizabeth married. The youngest child, April, was born 11 years into the strip's run and was 17 at its conclusion.

Panel excerpt of April and her friends commenting on sixth grade students and their fashion choices. Johnston received praise for her ability to take real world events and incorporate them into her story.

During its run, the strip was also celebrated for its realism, eschewing cartoon stereotypes in favour of a nuanced, relatable look at typical adult, child and teen concerns. For example, in the early 2000s, there was a Western trend in which students as young as ten years old wore thong underwear above their pants. In September 2004, Johnston used this trend as inspiration for a storyline in which April and her friends return to school to see the incoming sixth-graders dressing in revealing clothing and exposing their thongs. Johnston did not need to look far for inspiration; she noted, "We actually do get days that are warm enough for young girls to hang wildly out of their clothing."

The storyline in which Lawrence comes out as gay cemented this reputation, as well as various stories dealing with prejudice, bullying, the mentally and physically disabled, theft, cheating and abuse. The Pattersons were often shown as a good, "normal" family forced to deal with others from broken homes or worse situations.

== Animated series and specials ==
In 1985, Atkinson Film-Arts of Ottawa, in association with the CTV Television Network, produced an animated Christmas special based on For Better or for Worse entitled The Bestest Present. In the USA, it was first broadcast on HBO, and in later years, on The Disney Channel. Lynn's own children, Aaron and Katie, provided the voices of Michael and Elizabeth, and Rod Johnston made a cameo appearance as the voice of a mailman.

Beginning in 1992, another Ottawa-based studio, Lacewood Productions, produced six more specials, also for CTV. In the USA, these were seen on The Disney Channel, and then on TLC. According to Johnston, the set designs (for instance, for the Pattersons' house) these and subsequent television programs required led her to develop a much more sophisticated background style in the comic strips, with the layouts of homes and even towns consistent from story to story.

The six specials produced by Lacewood were:

- The Last Camping Trip (July 1992)
- The Good-for-Nothing (Halloween) (November 1992)
- A Christmas Angel (December 1992)
- A Valentine from the Heart (February 7, 1993)
- The Babe Magnet (a.k.a. The Sweet Deal) (September 1993)
- A Storm in April (June 1995)

In 2000, Funbag Animation (Note: As Funbag FBFW (Series 1) Production Company Inc. (season 1) and Funbag FBFW (Series 2) Production Company Inc. (season 2)), IMX Communications (Note: As IMX Better/Worse Inc.), Sound Venture, and Salter Street Films produced a new animated series for cable television network Teletoon, which began airing on November 5, 2000, and ran until December 16, 2001. Featuring introductions by Lynn Johnston herself, the show looked at three related storylines from three different eras of the strip—the mid-1980s, the early 1990s, and the late 1990s.

The series consisted of two seasons with eight episodes each. On March 23, 2004, Koch Vision released the complete series on DVD.

== Exhibits ==
In 2001, Visual Arts Brampton's Artway Gallery exhibited Johnston's work.
