= Girls With Slingshots =

Webcomic

- Official logo as of May 2014
- Author: Danielle Corsetto
- Website: http://www.gwscomic.com/
- Current status/schedule: Completed
- Launch date: September 29, 2004
- End date: March 13, 2015
- Genre(s): Comedy, humor, slice of life, gag strip

Girls With Slingshots is a completed webcomic series by Danielle Corsetto that premiered on September 29, 2004. The series follows several friends as they deal with life events like unemployment, marriage, and their sexuality. Corsetto self-publishes Girls With Slingshots on her website and has released ten volumes of the collected strips through Lulu.com and TopatoCo. Corsetto has received praise for her depiction of LGBTQ characters and characters with disabilities.

A related webcomic by Bill Ellis and Dani O'Brien entitled All New Issues, which follows Hazel's cousin Robyn, was launched in 2010 and put on semi-permanent hiatus in April 2014.

In 2017, Girls With Slingshots was included in the first set of 39 webcomics archived by the Library of Congress.

== Synopsis ==
Girls With Slingshots primarily centers around friends Hazel Tellington and Jamie McJack, but later grows to encompass a wider cast of characters. The series occasionally crosses over with other webcomics, most notably a story arc with Something Positive where Davan's cat Choo-Choo Bear impregnates Hazel's cat Sprinkles. Story lines are generally humorous, such as presenting restless leg syndrome as a sexually transmitted infection. However, the strip sometimes addresses serious topics like sexual identity and orientation.

== Development ==
Corsetto came up with the webcomic's name at the 2004 Pittsburgh Comicon, where she exhibited some of her work and drew commissions for congoers. Many of the congoers requested pictures of women holding guns and as Corsetto could not draw guns very well, she replaced the guns with slingshots. Corsetto came up with the title as a joke and after one of the attendees asked when the comic would be released, she decided to officially begin the webcomic. She focused the strip around Hazel Tellington, a character Corsetto had introduced in a strip she created while in high school, Hazelnuts.

When Corsetto launched Girls With Slingshots in 2004 she initially saw it as a way to "keep [her] chops up" and did not plan for it to become her primary source of income, but as the webcomic's popularity grew, Corsetto found that she could support herself on funds made via Girls With Slingshots. While writing the character of Jamie's girlfriend Erin, Corsetto stated that she did not intend for her to become a regular cast member and did not originally see Jamie as bisexual, but found that the two characters worked well together. As Erin did not fit into any typical label for sexuality, Corsetto researched the character and found that Erin most fit into the asexual community. Corsetto has used the website's open comments section as a way to address reader concerns within the webcomic, notably in 2014 when she addressed concerns about Hazel's drinking patterns and possible alcoholism. She stated that she did not see Hazel as an alcoholic, but did see where the character "has turned it into a problem and needs to take a break from it sometimes." Washington Post blogger Alyssa Rosenberg compared Hazel's drinking with that of Questionable Content character Faye in a January 22, 2015 article.

== Awards ==
- Lulu of the Year award (Friends of Lulu) (2009, won)
- Reuben Award: Online Comics – Short Form (2015, won)
