= Valerie D'Orazio =

American comic book writer and editor (born 1974)

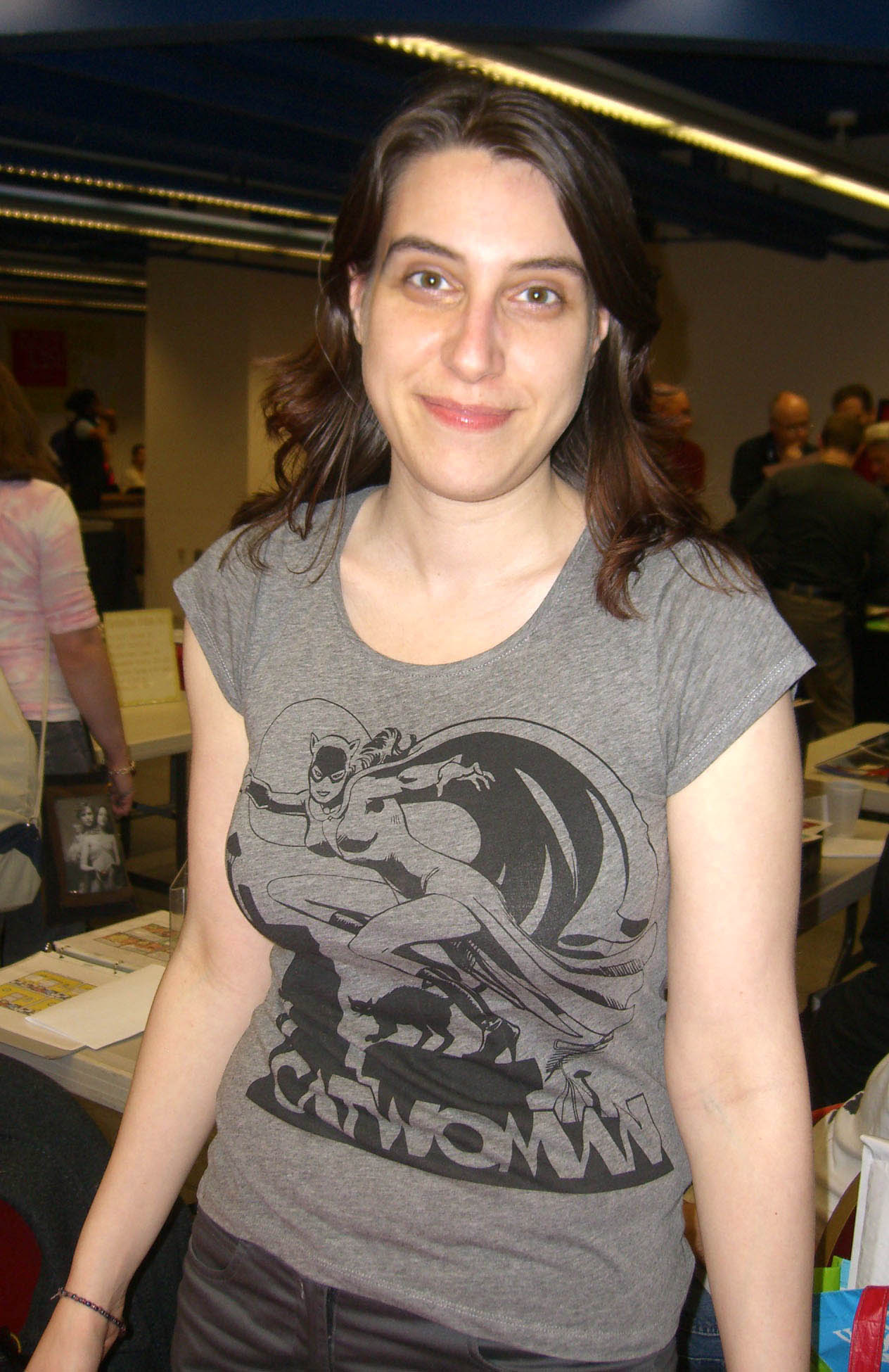
- D'Orazio at the Big Apple Con, 2008
- Born: February 23, 1974 (age 52) Brooklyn, New York, U.S.
- Areas: Blogger, writer, editor
- Pseudonyms: Occasional Superheroine; Kamikaze Girl; The Video Store Girl; Beatrix Kyle
- Notable works: President, Friends of Lulu (2007–2010)

Valerie D'Orazio (born February 23, 1974) is an American comic book writer and editor. She is known as a vocal advocate for women in the comics industry, and for sharing stories of her own struggles with being bullied and harassed.

== Career ==
D'Orazio was hired as assistant editor at Acclaim in 1997. She joined the Creative Services Department at DC Comics in 2000. In 2002, she became assistant editor to Editorial Art Director Mark Chiarello on titles such as Aquaman, Batman Black and White, and JLA.

After leaving DC in 2004, D'Orazio began a career as a blogger under a variety of pseudonyms. In 2006, she wrote a series of posts about her experiences with sexism in the American comic book industry, fandom, and her health struggles, entitled Goodbye to Comics. Soon afterward, in the period 2007–2010, D'Orazio was repeatedly bullied and harassed online by Chris Sims, an independent blogger.

It was announced at the 2008 San Diego Comic-Con that D'Orazio would be writing a five-part Cloak and Dagger limited series for Marvel. The series was never published.

D'Orazio served as a judge for the 2009 Glyph Comics Awards.

D'Orazio was President of Friends of Lulu, a non-profit organization that promoted women comic book creators and readers. She served from 2007 to 2010, after which the group was disbanded.

From 2010 to 2013, D'Orazio was the editor of MTV.com subsidiary MTV Geek.

In 2015, when Chris Sims was hired as a writer for Marvel, D'Orazio wrote about his prior harassment and bullying of her. The issue was covered extensively in the comics press.

== Personal life ==
D'Orazio was born in Brooklyn. She was previously married to comic book writer David Gallaher.

== Bibliography ==
As writer, unless otherwise noted

=== Marvel Comics ===
- Punisher MAX: Butterfly (May 2010)
- X-Men Origins: Emma Frost (July 2010)
- "A Brief Rendezvous," Girl Comics #1 (May 2010)

=== Bluewater Comics ===
- Beyond: Edward Snowden (2014)
- Beyond: The Joker Complex: The Man Who Laughs (2018)

== See also ==
- List of women comics writers and artists
- List of American comics creators
