= Linda Medley =

American cartoonist (born 1964)

- Born: May 17, 1964 (age 62) Stockton, California
- Areas: Artist, Writer, Colorist
- Notable works: Castle Waiting
- Awards: Xeric Award, 1996; Eisner Award, 1998

Linda Medley (born May 17, 1964 in Stockton, California) is an American comic book author and illustrator, known for her Castle Waiting series of comic books and graphic novels.

== Biography and early career ==
Born in Stockton, California, Medley now lives in Seattle, Washington.

Before embarking on Castle Waiting, Medley worked in the comics industry as a penciller, inker, painter, colorist, and sculptor. Her pencilling work includes stints on DC Comics' Justice League America (1991) and Doom Patrol (1993), as well as the Galactic Girl Guides for Tundra Press.

As a colorist, Medley worked for Image Comics in 1994–1995, most consistently on Deathblow. She colored DC's Batman and Robin Adventures for two years spanning 1995–1997.

A freelance illustrator since 1985, Medley has illustrated children's books for Putnam, Grosset & Dunlap, Houghton-Mifflin, and Western Publishing. Her paintings have appeared on the covers of Paradox Press's Family Man, Howard Cruse's Stuck Rubber Baby, and TSR, Inc.'s Dragon magazine.

== Castle Waiting ==
Castle Waiting tells the story of an isolated, abandoned castle and its eccentric inhabitants. Medley illustrates Castle Waiting in a style reminiscent of the work of Arthur Rackham and William Heath Robinson.

Medley conceived of Castle Waiting in 1984, when she was studying folklore and children's book illustration in college. Intending to do her own take on some of Grimm's fairy tales, Medley found herself most interested in the unexplained pasts—and their often unresolved fates—of the tales' background characters.

The first Castle Waiting publication was Castle Waiting: The Curse of Brambly Hedge, which was self-published by Medley with a 1996 grant from the Xeric Foundation. Medley self-published seven issues of an ongoing Castle Waiting series in 1997–98. In 1999, Medley self-published a Castle Waiting hiatus issue. Jeff Smith's Cartoon Books started publishing Castle Waiting (volume two; 4 issues) in 2000. In 2001, Medley went back to self-publishing and put out five more issues of the title. In 2006, Fantagraphics Books began publishing Castle Waiting, and as of April 2009, fifteen new issues have been published by them.

Medley is currently working on a series of nine graphic novels based on L. Frank Baum's Wizard of Oz books.

== Awards ==
Medley was a 1996 Xeric Award recipient. In 1996, she was an Ignatz Award nominee for Outstanding Anthology or Collection. In 1996, she was an Eisner Award nominee for Best Writer/Artist; and in 1998, she won two Eisner Awards, for Best Ongoing Story (Castle Waiting) and for Talent Deserving of Wider Recognition. Also in 1998, Medley was a Lulu Award nominee for Lulu of the Year.
