= John Patrick Green =

American author and illustrator

- Green at the 2026 National Book Festival
- Born: March 20, 1975 (age 51) Long Island, New York
- Areas: Cartoonist, Writer
- Notable works: InvestiGators; Jax Epoch and the Quicken Forbidden

John Patrick Green is an American author and illustrator best known for creating the children's graphic novel series InvestiGators, and illustrating the comic book series Jax Epoch and the Quicken Forbidden.

== Early life & education ==
Green grew up in Long Island, and now lives in Brooklyn. He had asthma and various allergens as a child, and often had to stay home from school. In a 2014 interview with The Beat, Green stated that "drawing was an activity I could do that wouldn't cause an asthma attack or expose me to allergens. My gateway into comics were the funny pages." He especially loved drawing Garfield, which he sold drawings of to friends at school. Green signed his artwork even at an early age, causing his school to ban him from selling these drawings. His first original comic was called The Footsies, about several child characters with very large feet. The Footsies series later expanded into parodies of comic books and movies.

Green attended the School of Visual Arts in New York City, where he met Dave Roman. He started his career as designer and editor for Disney Adventures magazine. He also worked as a freelance book designer.

== Career ==
Green and Dave Roman created the comic book series Jax Epoch and the Quicken Forbidden, with Roman as the writer and Green as illustrator. It was first serialized in issue-format comics in 1996; two volumes were published, subtitled Borrowed Magic and Separation Anxiety respectively. Green also co-created the Teen Boat! series with Roman, as a parody of Saturday morning cartoons such as Turbo Teen. Two books were published, while three more volumes were published as a webcomic.

Starting in 2019, Green developed the InvestiGators series. In 2020, the first book in the series was published, followed by seven sequels. There is also a spin-off series titled Agents of S.U.I.T., which is co-written with Christopher Hastings (Volumes 1-4) and Zac Gorman (Volume 5) and illustrated by Pat Lewis. About the series, Green says, "Of all the comics I’ve created in my professional career, making InvestiGators has come closest to recapturing that feeling of being eleven years old, drawing comics in my bedroom, with the sole intention of making my friends and classmates laugh."

In 2023, a small publishing company named Robert-Leslie Publishing, Inc. sued Green and Macmillan Publishers for trademark infringement. The case was dismissed without prejudice in 2026.

In 2026, it was revealed that Sycamore Studios had acquired the film rights to InvestiGators. In return, Green would create a graphic novel adaptation of Sycamore's upcoming film, Dr. Dolittle: King of the Wild. In an earlier interview, Green revealed that Netflix Animation Studios had previously optioned the rights, but failed to acquire them.

== Bibliography ==
- 2003: Jax Epoch and the Quicken Forbidden: Borrowed Magic
- 2004: Jax Epoch and the Quicken Forbidden: Separation Anxiety
- 2012: Teen Boat!
- 2015: Teen Boat! The Race for Boatlantis
- 2016: Hippopotamister
- 2018: Kitten Construction Company: Meet the House Kittens
- 2019: Kitten Construction Company: A Bridge Too Fur (a nominee of the 2020 Eisner Award for Best Publication for Early Readers)
- 2020: InvestiGators (a Barnes and Noble Best Book of the Year for 2020)
- 2020: InvestiGators: Take the Plunge
- 2021: InvestiGators: Off the Hook
- 2021: InvestiGators: Ants in Our P.A.N.T.S.
- 2022: InvestiGators: Braver and Boulder
- 2022: InvestiGators: Heist and Seek
- 2023: Agents of S.U.I.T. (a New York Times bestseller, with Christopher Hastings, illustrated by Pat Lewis)
- 2023: InvestiGators: All Tide Up
- 2024: InvestiGators: High-Rise Hijinks (with Christopher Hastings, illustrated by Pat Lewis, World Book Day release)
- 2024: Agents of S.U.I.T.: From Badger to Worse (with Christopher Hastings, illustrated by Pat Lewis)
- 2024: InvestiGators: Class Action
- 2025: Agents of S.U.I.T.: Wild Ghost Chase (with Christopher Hastings, illustrated by Pat Lewis)
- 2025: InvestiGators: Case Files (with Steve Behling, illustrated by Chris Fegnolio)
- 2026: Agents of S.U.I.T.: Wild Ghost Chase (with Christopher Hastings, illustrated by Pat Lewis)
- 2026: InvestiGators: Weather or Not
- 2026: InvestiGators: The Big Snappy Joke Book (UK-only release)
- 2027: Agents of S.U.I.T.: Tomb and Gloom (with Zac Gorman, illustrated by Pat Lewis)
- 2027: InvestiGators: Puzzle Adventures (with Steve Behling, illustrated by Alison Acton)
