= Dave Roman =

American cartoonist (born 1977)

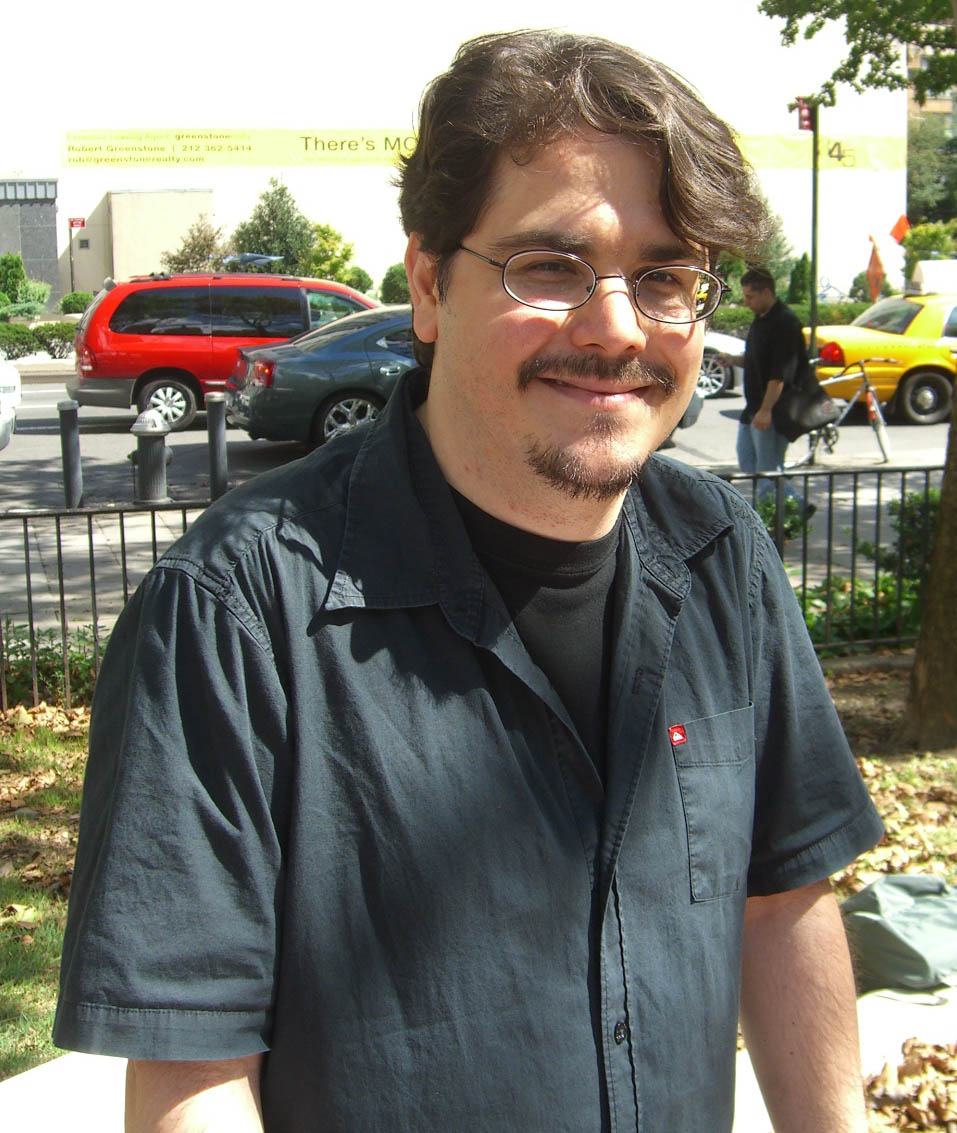
- Roman at the 2009 Brooklyn Book Festival
- Born: May 26, 1977 (age 49)
- Areas: Writer, artist
- Notable works: Jax Epoch and the Quicken Forbidden, Teen Boat
- Spouse: Raina Telgemeier (m. 2006; div. 2015)

Dave Roman (born May 26, 1977) is an American writer and artist of webcomics and comics.

== Career ==
Roman attended the School of Visual Arts in New York. He started working in comics as an intern at DC Comics, then got a full-time job at Nickelodeon Magazine as a comic editor for 11 years, until the magazine ceased publishing in 2009.

=== Works ===
Roman is the co-creator and writer of Jax Epoch and the Quicken Forbidden, a webcomic co-created and drawn by John Patrick Green. The webcomic was first published in 1997; two books of the webcomic were published, subtitled Borrowed Magic and Separation Anxiety respectively. Roman also co-created Teen Boat with Green. Two stories were published in print, while three are available online as a webcomic.

Roman has published three books in his "Astronaut Academy" series, which started as a webcomic. The first, Astronaut Academy: Zero Gravity (First Second, 2011) is about a young boy who leaves behind life as an intergalactic superhero to go to middle school.

Roman created the graphic novel Agnes Quill: An Anthology of Mystery, and in 2008 Paramount Pictures optioned the film rights. In the novel, the title character turns sixteen and inherits an estate and an ability to see and communicate with the dead. In 2009, Del Rey Manga released X-Men: Misfits, which Roman co-authored with his then-wife, Raina Telgemeier. It spent at least five weeks on the New York Times Bestseller list for Paperback Graphic Books.

Unicorn Boy, a children's graphic novel by Roman, was published in 2024. The American Library Association placed it on their 2024 Best Graphic Novels for Children reading list.

Other works include writing a comic adaptation of Avatar: The Last Airbender, co-writing a prequel comic for Avatar called Zuko's Story, and creating a collection of comic strips for Rugrats. He has also designed a CD cover for the wizard rock band Harry and the Potters. Roman has contributed to a number of anthology comic books, including Flight 3, Nursery Rhyme Comics (First Second, 2011), Not My Small Diary, and Bizarro World.

According to a 2011 article, Roman mainly earned a living "by touring the country and speaking to children in schools, libraries and bookstores about the joys of making comics." He has said that he loved to draw and tell stories as a kid and is now "trying to inspire that passion in other kids".

== Awards and reviews ==
Roman was given the Friends of Lulu Volunteer of the Year Award in 2003 for his work editing the Friends of Lulu anthology Broad Appeal.

The webcomic Quicken Forbidden #12 was nominated for a Harvey Award in the Best Single Issue or Story category in 2004, while Astronaut Academy won a Web Cartoonists' Choice Award for Outstanding New Character Design in 2005.

The webcomic Teen Boat #6: Vote Boat won the Ignatz Award for Outstanding Debut in 2004. A reviewer for Geek Dad said that they "thoroughly enjoyed" book one of Teen Boat. However, a reviewer for Kirkus Reviews criticized book one, saying, "[Its h]umor is often sophomoric, and most of the girls—with the exception of Teen Boat’s best friend—are busty caricatures. While some of the jokes will indeed induce a chuckle or two, many are stretched to the point of exhaustion". Of the second book, Kirkus said, "Bright spots aside, this parody of self-obsessed teen protagonists is so successful it gives readers no cause to root for the hero."

The children's graphic novel Unicorn Boy won the graphic novel category of the 2025 The Week Junior Book Awards.

Keith Mayerson, formerly a professor of comics and illustration at the School of Visual Arts, said that Roman was one of the school's "most successful and beloved alumni” and that "many of our students were familiar with their work long before they ever met them."

== Personal life ==
Roman grew up in North Babylon on Long Island, and has lived in Astoria, New York.

Roman was married to fellow cartoonist Raina Telgemeier; they were married in 2006 but they filed for divorce in 2015.
