= X-Men Misfits =

Manga

X-Men: Misfits is an original English-language manga version of the X-Men story written by Dave Roman and Raina Telgemeier, and drawn by Anzu. Published in 2009, it is owned by both Del Rey Manga and Marvel. The book is the story of Kitty Pryde and her time at Xavier's School for Gifted Youngsters.

The book appeared on The New York Times Best Seller list for paperback graphic novels for at least five weeks.

== Plot ==
Kitty Pryde has always been an outcast at school especially when her mutant genes kick in. Shortly after she is visited by a teacher at Xavier's School for Gifted Youngsters. When Kitty arrives at the school she finds she is the first female student at the school, the only other girls being the teachers Jean Grey, and Ororo Munroe (Storm). She is taken in by the Hellfire Club, a group of hot headed mutants.

== Settings ==
The story takes place at Xavier's School for Gifted Youngsters (X-Mansion). The areas shown are the Danger Room, Cafeteria, Girls Wing, and Class Rooms.

== Characters ==
Kitty Pryde
The main character of X-Men Misfits. Kitty feels like she is an outcast even after she begins attending Xavier's School. She is a mutant who has the power to walk through anything. Her powers kick in during school one day. She is given a scholarship to Xavier's School by Erik Lehnsherr (Magneto). She is the first female student of Xavier's School. On her first day at school she meets Bobby (Iceman) who acts very cold to her, and she is taken in by the members of the Hellfire Club. Her family owns the family restaurant Pryde of Chicago. She has two sisters, Sarah and Lindsay, aged 14 and 17.

Pyro (John Allerdyce)
A student at Xavier's school. He is a member of the Hellfire Club and Kitty's (ex)boyfriend. He is a mutant with power over fire. He has a snobbish attitude and sees mutants as the superior race. He loves to cause trouble and is extremely protective of Kitty. Pyro is definitely a hot - headed guy who is normally mean to anyone outside the Hellfire Club. He goes by Pyro instead of his human name.

Iceman (Bobby)
The first student Kitty is introduced to when she enters the school, he acts pretty cold around her and most everyone else, save for a few certain people. He is a mutant with the power over ice. He is very different from Pyro; even though he gives off a cold attitude he is nicer than Pyro. He does not see the mutants as a superior race and this is shown because he still uses his real name. He may act cold to Kitty but he does like her a lot, especially after she tries to protect him during the school trip to New York.

Magneto
A physics teacher at Xavier's school and an alpha mutant who has the power over metal. He is the one who gave the scholarship to Kitty in the beginning. He sees mutants as the superior race and believes that all mutants should go by their mutant name and abandon their mortal ones. He is the main contributor to the Hellfire Club who agree with his philosophy. He tends to stray from his lessons in physics and more toward his philosophy and politics, especially on Mutant Rights. When Kitty has her first class with him, he tells her to call him Magneto (she says "Magneato?").

Xavier (Professor X)
The founder of Xavier's school. He is an alpha mutant who can read people's minds. In the beginning of the series Xavier can walk, but after a trip to New York loses the ability. He sees the humans and mutants as equals. Most of the mutants at the school see the way he does. He is good friends with Magneto.

Angel (Warren Worthington III)
Another student at Xavier's school who - as his mutant name states - has angel wings. He is the leader of the Hellfire Club and is very conceited and egotistic. He's also an incredible flirt and hardly knows what "no" means. As soon as he meets Kitty, he begins flirting with her and asks her to be his girlfriend, but she turns him down. He boasts that 'Countless girls would throw themselves on a cross for me'.

Havok (Alex Summers)
He is the brother of Scott Summers and another student at Xavier's school. He is a mutant with the power of shooting destructive plasma blasts. He is a member of the Hellfire Club and hates his brother Scott. He, like the rest of the members of the Hellfire Club, hates humans and thinks that mutants are better, thus throwing away his human name and taking his mutant one. He loses control on the trip to New York, causing Xavier to lose his ability to walk.

Forge
He is yet another member of the Hellfire Club with the power over mechanics. He seems to be the group's most technical guy and becomes really close with Kitty, which Pyro despises. Kitty views him as the "brother she never had".

Longshot
His human name is Vince and he too is a member of the Hellfire Club. He can shoot anything with perfect aim, as shown when he shoots acorns at human rights protesters. He has the same philosophy as the other members of the club about humans and mutants.

Quicksilver
Another member of the Hellfire Club. He is very fast and also shares the club's philosophy, although not much is known about him at this time.

Kurt (Nightcrawler)
A mutant at the school who possesses a demonic appearance and the ability to teleport. He is Kitty's first training partner in Gym class. He and Kitty become good friends right away.

Fred (Blob)
A friend of Kitty's. He is really nice to her but can get on some people's nerves when he does not think. They become friends right away.

Scott Summers (Cyclops)
A student at Xavier's school and Havok's brother. He fires optic blasts out of his eyes, though he does not have the best control yet so he wears special glasses. He and his brother do not exactly see eye to eye. He agrees with Xavier's philosophy, unlike Havok who agrees with Magneto's. He and Kitty are friends and he's strictly vegan.

Gambit
He is never formally introduced but shows up several times throughout the first volume. He is a great cook and that is how Kitty first meets him. They meet when she is looking to sneak a snack after hiding from the Hellfire Club. Gambit was in the kitchen making a dessert and lets her try one. He becomes an acquaintance of Kitty.

Ms. Munroe (Storm)
She is the environmental teacher at Xavier's school and has the power over weather. She takes on the appearance punk-Storm, sporting a mohawk and wearing very punk-like clothing. She is a good friend of Xavier's.

Beast
He is never introduced by name but he teaches math at the school. He seems to dislike Pyro a lot due to Pyro's attitude.

Professor Rasputin (Colossus)
The history teacher at Xavier's School.

Sabretooth (Victor Creed)
Shown as a sort of servant to the Hellfire Club, his only appearance being in the luncheon Kitty is dragged to early in the manga. He retains a beast-like appearance. After acting a bit rude to Kitty, he is scolded by Longshot "Come now Sabretooth...is that anyway to behave in front of a lady?". Sabretooth 'brightens up' by saying "Care for some fondue, Miss?"

== Volumes ==
Volume 1:

Chapter One: Kitty's first day at the school, Getting accepted into the Hellfire Club and making new friends.

Chapter Two: Kitty's shown all the privileges of being a member of the Hellfire Club and also her first day in Gym Class. She and Pyro are an official couple.

Chapter Three: The trip to New York and Havok losing control.

Epilogue for Volume 1: Kitty going home for Winter break.

== Publications ==
- X-Men: Misfits #1

- Marvel version (ISBN 978-1-302-91859-0, 2019-06-25/2019-08)
- Del Rey Manga (Random House) version (ISBN 978-0-345-50514-9)
