= Comic & Fantasy Art Amateur Press Association =

The Comic and Fantasy Art Amateur Press Association (CFA-APA) was founded in 1985 by Roger Hill. Its membership consists of knowledgeable fans, creators, and collectors of comic and fantasy art who write about various subjects related to those genres. The group self-publishes approximately three times a year and each issue has a theme relating to a specific creator or subject. Currently, membership is limited to 40 persons at any one time and circulation is limited to 55 issues, making the publication itself highly collectible.

The CFA-APA began as an informal forum for original comic art collectors to exchange ideas, experiences and information. It provides serious fans and collectors of comic and fantasy art with a forum/publication for discussion of topics, ideas or opinions relative to the original art marketplace. It is designed for those people who have a genuine interest and love for all types of art collecting: comic book art, illustrations of science fiction, fantasy, horror or adventure stories, pin-up/good-girl art, cover art from paperbacks, hardcover books, magazines or pulps, newspaper strips or cartoon art, animation art, film posters or advertising artwork, and related illustrations or sketches.

Founder Roger Hill was one of the most active comic art collectors, researchers and comic art historians in the United States. He was a comic art consultant to the Sothebys Comic Book and Art auctions held in New York City during the 1990s. He was a contributing writer and Art Editor for the book, Against the Grain: Mad Artist Wallace Wood and a writer and editor for the book Frank R. Paul: The Dean of Science Fiction Illustration. Both of these publications were monographs regarding the life and artwork of each of these two artists. Roger was one of the founding contributors to the Squa Tront EC fanzine along with Jerry Weist. Roger's interest in original art lead to the formation of the CFA-APA, after being inspired by the Edgar Rice Burroughs Amateur Press Association (ERBapa). The ERBapa had previously been founded by John Guidry.

== History ==
A history of the CFA-APA was a chapter in the 2011 The Comic Art Price Guide.

Roger Hill served as editor of the CFA-APA, initially from Mailing #1 (June 30, 1985) to #15. The original membership included 17 members, four of whom were delinquent in sending in contributions to the first mailing. Wallace Harrington was the editor for Mailings #16-30, 33-34. Roger Hill edited Mailings #31, #32 and #53-60, Bob Koppany #35-49, Bill Leach #50-52, and Benno Rothschild #61-89. Wallace Harrington resumed editorial duties again with Mailing #91, followed by David Applegate from Mailing #101 onwards.

Included among the group members who have written articles or books to add to the history of comics are Tom Roberts (Alex Raymond: His Life and Art), Jim Amash (Matt Baker: The Art of Glamour, Carmine Infantino: Penciler, Publisher, Provocateur), Dewey Cassell (The Art of George Tuska, Marie Severin: The Mirthful Mistress of Comics), Wallace Harrington (Neville Colvin: A Modest Man), Gary Land (Edwin Austin Abbey: Master of Detail Illustration Magazine #40), Benno Rothschild (Rough Stuff interview with Brian Stelfreeze in Rough Stuff #6), David L. Applegate ("Coming out in the comic strips" from Hogan's Alley no. 1, 1994, Bullmoose Publishing, Atlanta), Raymond A. Cuthbert (The Two-Gun Kid: The Silver Age Western Super-Hero, Comic Book Marketplace #98, January 2003; Alex Raymond's Flash Gordon: The Comic Strip as Epic Fantasy, Comic Book Marketplace #93, August 2002, An Interview with Hello Betty! Artist, Terry Twigg), and Bill Leach (editor and publisher of Horror From the Crypt of Fear #8-14, the only EC HorrorZine approved by the William M. Gaines Estate); Robert L. Reiner, curator of the Society of Illustrators Museum of Illustration exhibition, "What, Me PANIC? Celebrating Angelo Torres", and the writer of the adaptation of Otto Binder's previously unpublished 1953 story, The Unwanted, illustrated by Angelo Torres and Stefan Koidl, publisher Fantagraphics. Other members such as John Stuart and Steve Nam have included comic and fantasy art in their works of fiction (the novel Cryptic Inks and short story "Streets like Gray Wolves" in Tulane Review, respectively).

== Magazine contents ==
The magazine consists of articles written, laid out, and duplicated by its members that are sent to an editor/collator for distribution. Each issue is dedicated to specific articles or general themes. Each issue is dedicated to a specific artist or general theme.

Some of the featured artists themselves write guest contributions. Occasionally, the CFA-APA has a give-away in an issue, typically giving away a free piece of artwork to a member rendered by the featured artist, or related to the feature artist.

== Membership ==
Annual dues are used to cover the costs of binding, packaging and mailing the CFA-APA. Membership is limited to 40 people at any one time. Vacancies in the membership roll are filled from a waiting list on a first-come, first-served basis.

Each member must contribute at least two pages or original typed text material for each mailing. They can talk about comments from the prior issue, the artist being featured, comic art auctions or anything related to original art in general. It turns out to be only two pages submitted every four months to remain a CFA-APA member (most members typically contribute more). Should a member miss an issue, they must contribute four pages of text to the following issue. If they fail to do so, they forfeit their active membership and go to the end of the waiting list for new members if they like.

If a member is suspected of fraudulent art dealings, they are asked to temporarily relinquish their membership until they are cleared of the charges or until restitution to the parties has been made.

== Past dedications ==
CFA-APA #1 no dedication - Roger Hill, editor - 56 pages (Bernie Wrightson front & back covers), 50 copies, 1985 (erroneously 1987 on the cover)

CFA-APA #2 Wally Wood - Wood cover - Roger Hill, editor - 113 pages (Wally Wood front cover; Vaughn Bodē, back cover), 50 copies, 1985

CFA-APA #3 Bill Everett - Roger Hill, editor - 138 pages (Bill Everett front cover; Neal Adams back cover), only 40 copies, 1985

CFA-APA #4 Michael Kaluta - Roger Hill, editor - 168 pages (Michael Kaluta front cover; Mike Ploog, back cover), 50 copies, 1986

CFA-APA #5 Berni Wrightson - Roger Hill, editor - 150 pages + APA supplement Alfred Andriola by Bart Bush of 41 pages (Berni Wrightson front & back covers), 50 copies, 1986

CFA-APA #6 Frank Frazetta - Roger Hill, editor - 158 pages (Frank Frazetta front & back covers), 50 copies, 1986

CFA-APA #7 J. Allen St. John - Roger Hill, editor - 149 pages (J. Allen St. John front & back covers), 50 copies, 1986

CFA-APA #8 Lou Fine - Roger Hill, editor - 209 pages + APA supplement Lou Fine Checklist of 30 pages (Lou Fine front & back covers), 50 copies, 1987

CFA-APA #9 Roy Krenkel - Roger Hill, editor - 177 pages + APA supplement Chicago Con 1987 (Roy Krenkel front & back covers), 60 copies, 1987

CFA-APA #10 Russ Heath - Roger Hill, editor - 234 pages + APA supplement Russ Heath Checklist (Russ Heath front & back covers), 60 copies, 1987

CFA-APA #11 Pulp Artists - Roger Hill, editor - 228 pages (Norman Saunders, front cover; Hannes Bok, back cover), 60 copies, 1988

CFA-APA #12 Murphy Anderson - Roger Hill, editor - 155 pages + APA supplement EC Checklist by Bill Leach of 64 pages (Murphy Anderson front & back covers), 60 copies, 1988

CFA-APA #13 Dick Sprang - Roger Hill, editor - 186 pages (Dick Sprang, front & back covers), 60 copies, 1988

CFA-APA #14 Syndicated Newspaper Strip Artists v1 - Roger Hill, editor - 214 pages (Hal Foster front cover; Winsor McCay back cover), 60 copies, 1989

CFA-APA #15 Al Williamson - Roger Hill, editor - 186 pages (Al Williamson front & back covers), 60 copies, 1989

CFA-APA #16 Jack Kirby v1 - Wallace Harrington, editor - 253 pages (Jack Kirby front & back covers), 60 copies, 1989

CFA-APA #17 Will Eisner v1 - Wallace Harrington, editor - 165 pages + APA supplement New York Times Article by Will Eisner (Will Eisner front & back covers), 60 copies, 1990

CFA-APA #18 Harvey Kurtzman - Wallace Harrington, editor - 180 pages + APA supplement by David L Applegate 'Heart And Soul Of The Big Red Cheese: Captain Marvel' (Harvey Kurtzman front & back covers), 60 copies, 1990

CFA-APA #19 Hal Foster & Alex Raymond - Wallace Harrington, editor - 226 pages (Hal Foster front cover; Alex Raymond back cover), 60 copies, 1990

CFA-APA #20 Graham Ingels - Wallace Harrington, editor - 253 pages (Graham Ingels front & back covers), 60 copies, 1990

CFA-APA #21 Good Girl Artists v1 - Wallace Harrington, editor - 329 pages (Adam Hughes front cover; Mark Schultz back cover), 60 copies, 1991

CFA-APA #22 Joe Kubert - Wallace Harrington, editor - 253 pages (Joe Kubert front & back covers), 60 copies, 1991

CFA-APA #23 Alex Toth v1 - Wallace Harrington, editor - 287 pages (Alex Toth front & back covers), 60 copies, 1991

CFA-APA #24 The New Breed - Wallace Harrington, editor - 188 pages (word art front cover; Kent Williams back cover), 60 copies, 1991

CFA-APA #25 John Severin - Wallace Harrington, editor - 162 pages (John Severin front & back covers), 60 copies, 1992

CFA-APA #26 Artists of The Studio: Michael Kaluta, Jeffrey Catherine Jones, Barry Windsor-Smith, Berni Wrightson - Wallace Harrington, editor - 264 pages (Michael Kaluta, Jeffrey Jones, Barry Windsor-Smith, Berni Wrightson, front cover; Jeffrey Jones, back cover), 60 copies, 1992

CFA-APA #27 Steve Ditko - Wallace Harrington, editor - 302 pages (Steve Ditko front & back covers), 60 copies, 1992

CFA-APA #28 Reed Crandall - Wallace Harrington, editor - 212 pages (Reed Crandall front & back covers), 60 copies, 1992

CFA-APA #29 Golden Age Artists: Hero & Horror - Wallace Harrington, editor - 244 pages (Norman Saunders front cover; Creig Flessel, back cover), 60 copies, 1993

CFA-APA #30 Syndicated Newspaper Strip Artists v2 - Wallace Harrington, editor - 156 pages (Berkley Breathed front cover; Bill Watterson, back cover), 60 copies, 1993

CFA-APA #31 Milton Caniff - Roger Hill, editor - 178 pages (Milton Caniff front & back covers), 60 copies, 1993

CFA-APA #32 Warren Artists - Roger Hill, editor - 136 pages (Neal Adams front cover; Berni Wrightson, back cover), 1993

CFA-APA #33 Science Fiction Artists - Wallace Harrington, editor - 186 pages (Virgil Finlay front & back covers), 60 copies, 1994

CFA-APA #34 ERB Artists - Wallace Harrington, editor - 236 pages (J. Allen St. John front cover; Reed Crandall, back cover), only 40 copies, 1994

CFA-APA #35 Artists of the Underground Comix - Bob Koppany & John Province, editors, Bill Leach cover designer - 287 pages (Robert Crumb front cover; Montage of various underground cartoonists, back cover), 60 copies, 1994

CFA-APA #36 Artists of the EC Comics - Bob Koppany & John Province, editors, Bill Leach cover designer - 335 pages (Johnny Craig front cover; Graham Ingels, back cover), 60 copies, 1994

CFA-APA #37 Neal Adams - Bob Koppany & John Province, editors, Bill Leach cover designer - 243 pages (Neal Adams front & back covers), 60 copies, 1995

CFA-APA #38 Mac Raboy & the Fawcett Artists - Bob Koppany & John Province, editors, Bill Leach cover designer - 287 pages (Mac Raboy front & back covers), 60 copies, 1995

CFA-APA #39 Carmine Infantino - Bob Koppany & John Province, editors, Bill Leach cover designer - 370 pages (Carmine Infantino front & back covers), 60 copies, 1996

CFA-APA #40 Good Girl Artists 2 - Bob Koppany, editor, Bill Leach cover designer - 271 pages (Bill Ward front & back covers), 60 copies, 1996

CFA-APA #41 Why We Collect - Bob Koppany, editor, Bill Leach cover designer - 271 pages (Joe Kubert, front cover; Basil Wolverton, back cover), 60 copies, 1996

CFA-APA #42 Jim Steranko - Bob Koppany, editor, Bill Leach cover designer - 217 pages (Jim Steranko front & back covers), 60 copies, 1997

CFA-APA #43 The Superman Artists (Boring, Shuster & Swan) - Bob Koppany, editor, Bill Leach cover designer - 237 pages (Joe Shuster front cover; Kurt Schaffenberger, back cover), 60 copies, 1997

CFA-APA #44 Winsor McCay - Bob Koppany, editor, Bill Leach cover designer - 294 pages (Winsor McCay front cover; photo of Winsor McCay, back cover), 60 copies, 1997

CFA-APA #45 Walt Kelly - Bob Koppany, editor, Bill Leach cover designer - 248 pages (Walt Kelly front & back covers), 60 copies, 1998

CFA-APA #46 The Art of Moebius - Bob Koppany, editor, Bill Leach cover designer - 195 pages (Moebius front & back covers), 60 copies, 1998

CFA-APA #47 Quality Comics Artists: Lou Fine, Jack Cole, et al - Bob Koppany, editor, Bill Leach cover designer - 237 pages (Lou Fine front & back covers), 60 copies, 1998

CFA-APA #48 Wally Wood v2 - Bob Koppany, editor, Bill Leach cover designer - 237 pages (Wally Wood front & back covers), 60 copies, 1999

CFA-APA #49 Personal Under-rated Favorites - Bob Koppany, editor, Bill Leach cover designer - 268 pages (Frank Rhodes, front cover; Frank Cho, back cover), 60 copies, 1999

CFA-APA #50 Monsters Past & Present - Bill Leach, editor and cover designer - 343 pages (Johnny Craig, front cover; Xno, back cover) 60 copies, 1999

CFA-APA #51 Russ Manning, Dell & Gold Key Artists - Bill Leach, editor and cover designer - 300+ pages [total not given on contents page] (Russ Manning, front & back covers), 60 copies, 2000

CFA-APA #52 Best Artists from 80's & 90's - Bill Leach, editor and cover designer - 200+ pages [total not given on contents page] (Ken Hooper, front & back covers), 60 copies, 2000

CFA-APA #53 Those Wacky Cartoonists - Roger Hill, editor - 241 pages (Basil Wolverton, front cover; Jack Davis, back cover), 50 copies, 2001

CFA-APA #54 History in Comics - Roger Hill, editor - 216 pages (Warren Tufts, front cover; Joe Kubert, back cover), only 40 copies, 2001

CFA-APA #55 Unpublished Masterpieces, Preliminaries and Sketches - Roger Hill, editor - 300 pages (Roy Krenkel, front cover; Jim Steranko, back cover), only 40 copies, 2001

CFA-APA #56 Obscure Comic, Newspaper Strip, And Fantasy Illustrators - Roger Hill, editor - 262 pages (H.J. Ward, front cover; H.L. Parkhurst, back cover), 40 #d copies, 2002

CFA-APA #57 Alex Raymond - Roger Hill, editor - 274 pages (Alex Raymond, front & back covers), 40 #d copies, 2002

CFA-APA #58 Gil Kane & DC Silver Age Artists - Roger Hill, editor - 237 pages (Gil Kane front & back covers), 40 #d copies, 2002

CFA-APA #59 The Charlton Artists - informally aka Ditko 2 - Roger Hill, editor - 179 pages (Steve Ditko, front cover; Charlton cover collage back cover), 40 #d copies, 2002

CFA-APA #60 The War Artists - Roger Hill, editor - 351 pages (Wally Wood, front cover; Jerry Grandinetti, back cover), 40 #d copies, 2003

CFA-APA #61 The Fleagle Gang: Frank Frazetta, Al Williamson, et al - Benno Rothschild, Troy Pierce, Dave Newton, editors - 223 pages (Roy Krenkel, Al Williamson, Frank Frazetta, montage front cover; Frank Frazetta, back cover), 40 #d copies, 2003

CFA-APA #62 The Chase: The Thrill Of The Hunt - Benno Rothschild, Troy Pierce, Dave Newton, editors - 229 pages (Hal Foster, front & back covers), 40 #d copies, 2004

CFA-APA #63 Artists of the Humor Magazines - Benno Rothschild, Troy Pierce, Dave Newton, editors - 250 pages (Don Martin & Jack Bender, front cover; Jack Davis, back cover), 45 #d copies, 2004

CFA-APA #64 Comic Masters Still Going Strong - Benno Rothschild, Troy Pierce, Dave Newton, editors - 223 pages (Bill Stout, front & back covers), 55 #d copies, 2004

CFA-APA #65 Will Eisner v2 - Benno Rothschild, Troy Pierce, Dave Newton, editors - 330 pages (Will Eisner front & back covers), 55 #d copies, 2005

CFA-APA #66 The Artists of the Fantastic Four - Benno Rothschild & Dave Newton, editors - 251 pages (Jack Kirby, front cover; John Byrne, back cover), 55 #d copies, 2005

CFA-APA #67 Recreations - Threat or Menace? - Benno Rothschild & Dave Newton, editors - 335 pages (Fred Hembeck, front cover; Fred Ray, back cover), 55 #d copies, 2005

CFA-APA #68 Gene Colan - Benno Rothschild & Dave Newton, editors - 388 pages (Gene Colan, front & back covers), 54 #d copies, 2006

CFA-APA #69 Frank Miller - Benno Rothschild & Dave Newton, editors - 288 pages (Frank Miller, front & back covers), 53 #d copies, 2006

CFA-APA #70 Alex Toth v2 - Benno Rothschild & Dave Newton, editors - 360 pages (Alex Toth, front & back covers), 55 #d copies, 2006

CFA-APA #71 Comic Art Around the World - Benno Rothschild & Dave Newton, editors - 397 pages (Saverio Tenuta, front cover; Goseki Kojima, back cover), 55 #d copies, 2007

CFA-APA #72 Modern Good Girl Art - Benno Rothschild & Dave Newton, editors - 374 pages (Travios Charest, front cover; Butch Guice & Mike Perkins, back cover), 55 #d copies, 2007

CFA-APA #73 Best Deals, Worst Deals & Holy Grails - Benno Rothschild & Dave Newton, editors - 349 pages (Cully Hamner, front cover; Frank Frazetta, back cover), 55 #d copies, 2007

CFA-APA #74 Living Legends: Jack Davis, Al Williamson, Frank Frazetta, Steve Ditko - Benno Rothschild & Dave Newton, editors - 330 pages (Jack Davis, front cover; Dan Spiegle, back cover), 55 #d copies, 2008

CFA-APA #75 Western Art: Dick Ayers et al - Benno Rothschild & Dave Newton, editors - 401 pages (Dick Ayers, front & back covers), 55 #d copies, 2008

CFA-APA #76 Commissions - Benno Rothschild & Dave Newton, editors - 298 pages (Sanjulián, front cover; Michael Kaluta, back cover), 50 #d copies, 2008

CFA-APA #77 The Art of Robert E. Howard - Benno Rothschild & Dave Newton, editors - 396 pages (Mark Schultz, front cover; Ken Kelly, back cover), 50 #d copies, 2009

CFA-APA #78 The Art of Inking - Benno Rothschild & Dave Newton, editors - 395 pages (Milton Caniff, front cover; Steve McNiven & Dexter Vines, back cover), 50 #d copies, 2009

CFA-APA #79 The Art of Romance - Benno Rothschild & Dave Newton, editors - 369 pages (Jay Scott Pike, front cover; Dick Giordano & Vince Colletta, back cover), 50 #d copies, 2009

CFA-APA #80 Science Fiction Art - Benno Rothschild & Dave Newton, editors - 389 pages (Frank R. Paul, front cover; Mark Schultz, back cover), 50 #d copies, 2010

CFA-APA #81 Frank Frazetta & Al Williamson - Benno Rothschild & Dave Newton, editors - 434 pages (Frank Frazetta, front cover; Al Williamson, back cover), 50 #d copies, 2010

CFA-APA #82 The Art of Covers - Benno Rothschild & Dave Newton, editors - 400 pages (Alex Schomburg, front cover; Curt Swan & George Klein, back cover), 50 #d copies, 2010

CFA-APA #83 Jeffrey Catherine Jones - Benno Rothschild & Dave Newton, editors - 408 pages (Jeffrey Jones, front & back covers), 50 #d copies, 2011

CFA-APA #84 Gray Morrow - Benno Rothschild & Dave Newton, editors - 299 pages (Gray Morrow, front & back covers), 55 #d copies, 2011

CFA-APA #85 The Collectors - Benno Rothschild & Dave Newton, editors - 401 pages (Pete Alvarado, front cover; Mike DeCarlo, back cover), 50 #d copies, 2011

CFA-APA #86 Short-Run Heroes - Benno Rothschild & Dave Newton, editors - 275 pages (Kurt Schaffenberger, front & back covers), 50 #d copies, 2012

CFA-APA #87 The Art of Illustration - Benno Rothschild & Dave Newton, editors - 500 pages (Barye Phillips, front cover; Gary Gianni, back cover), 50 #d copies, 2012

CFA-APA #88 Jack Davis - Benno Rothschild & Dave Newton, editors - 340 pages (Jack Davis, front & back covers), 50 #d copies, 2012

CFA-APA #89 The Artists of Spider-man - Benno Rothschild & Dave Newton, editors - 341 pages (John Romita, front cover; Steve Ditko, back cover), 50 #d copies, 2013

CFA-APA #90 Gone But Not Forgotten: Artwork We've Sold - Wally Harrington, editor - 315 pages, 50 #d copies, July 2013

CFA-APA #91 Richard Corben - Wally Harrington, editor - 312 page, 50 #d copies, December 2013

CFA-APA #92 Al Feldstein - Wally Harrington, editor - 402 pages, 50 #d copies, March 2014

CFA-APA #93 The Art of Harvey Comics - Wally Harrington, editor, 50 #d copies, July 2014

CFA-APA #94 The Art of Horror Comics - Wally Harrington, editor, 50 #d copies, November 2014

CFA-APA #95 Guilty Pleasure - Artists & Characters Other Collectors Ignore - Wally Harrington, editor, 50 #d copies, March 2015

CFA-APA #96 John and Sal Buscema - Wally Harrington, editor, 50 #d copies, July 2015

CFA-APA #97 Bob Powell - Wally Harrington, editor, 50 #d copies, November 2015

CFA-APA #98 The Artists of Superman and Batman - Wally Harrington, editor, 48 #d copies, March 2016

CFA-APA #99 Russ Manning v2 - Wally Harrington, editor, 50 #d copies, July 2016

CFA-APA #100 Personal Favorites - Wally Harrington, editor; includes supplement Prints Of Milton Caniff, 50 #d copies, November 2016

CFA-APA #101 Bernie Wrightson v2 - David Applegate, editor; 50 #d copies, 2017

CFA-APA #102 Jack Kirby v2 - David Applegate, editor; 50 #d copies, 2017

CFA-APA #103 Artist Invasion: Brits, Euros, Fillipinos - David Applegate, editor; 50 #d copies, 2017

CFA-APA #104 Parody & Political Cartooning - David Applegate, editor; 50 #d copies, 2018

CFA-APA #105 The Art of Collecting - David Applegate, editor; 50 #d copies, 2018

CFA-APA #106 The Art of Book Illustration - David Applegate, editor; 50 #d copies, 2018

CFA-APA #107 The Independent Crowd - David Applegate, editor; 50 #d copies, 2019

CFA-APA #108 The Art of the Comic Strip - David Applegate, editor; 50 #d copies, 2019

CFA-APA #109 Recreations and Reinterpretations - David Applegate, editor; 50 #d copies, 2019

CFA-APA #110 The Art of Fanzines - David Applegate, editor; 50 #d copies, 2020

CFA-APA #111 Women in Comics - David Applegate, editor; 50 #d copies, 2020

CFA-APA #112 The Art Of Tarzan and Friends - David Applegate, editor; 50 #d copies, 2020

CFA-APA #113 State of the Market/Frauds & Fakes - David Applegate, editor; 50 #d copies, 2021

CFA-APA #114 The Art of Commissions - David Applegate, editor; 50 #d copies, 2021

CFA-APA #115 The Art of Swipes - David Applegate, editor; 50 #d copies, 2022

CFA-APA #116: Dedicated to the Art of John Byrne and George Perez (with Special Salutes to the late Neal Adams) - David Applegate, editor; 50 #d copies, 2022

CFA-APA #117 Western and War Art - David Applegate, editor, 50 #d copies, 2022

CFA-APA #118 "All in the Family" (Cartoon Artist Family Members) - David Applegate, editor, 50 #d copies, 2023

CFA-APA #119 "I Can Hear Music" (Fantasy Art and Music) - David Applegate, editor, 50 #d copies, 2023

CFA-APA #120 "Our Original Art" - David Applegate, editor, 50 #d copies, 2023

CFA-APA #121 "The Art of Archie" - David Applegate, editor, 50 #d copies, 2024

CFA-APA #122 "What We Collect: Art v. Nostalgia" - David Applegate, editor, 50 #d copies, 2024

CFA-APA #123 "Artists of the Last Ten Years" - David Applegate, editor, 50 #d copies, 2024

CFA-APA #124 "Tales of Collecting" - David Applegate, editor, 50 #d copies, 2025

The Best of the CFA-APA

As of October 2013, three reprint collections designed to showcase the best articles in the magazines have been published by R. Gary Land, under the umbrella title Giant-Size Fan-Thing. Volume 1 printed selected articles from the first 20 mailings, under the wrap-around cover displaying the artwork on the covers of those same mailings. Volume 2 printed selected articles from the mailings #21-30 with a front cover by comic artist Doug Wildey. Volume 3 printed selected articles from mailings #31-40 with a front cover by noted comic artist Michael Wm. Kaluta. The Giant-Size Fan-Thing books have been limited to 200 copies each.

Special Publications

There have also been occasional special publications of the CFA-APA. Three of these have been entitled CFA-APA Party Special Edition (July 1987), CFA-APA Party Special Edition 2 (August 1989), and CFA-APA Party Special Edition 3. These three publications were created by the CFA-APA Founder, Roger Hill. There has also been a CFA-APA Exclusive EC Check List from Bill Leach Collectibles (1988), CFA-APA Hembeck Special created by R. Gary Land; a Lou Fine Index; a 1997 CFA-APA Original Comic Art Directory; a CFA-APA - 20th Anniversary Index of the CFA-APA Booklet created by Ray Cuthbert; and a Virgil Finlay Companion Book to CFA-APA of a 100 copy print run.

A Look to the Future

The CFA-APA serves as a forum for documenting the history of the ever-growing field of comic and fantasy art collecting, for future generations. Every issue continues to be archived by the Rare Book and Manuscript Library at Columbia University.
