= Castle Waiting =

Graphic novel series by Linda Medley

Publication information
- Publisher: Fantagraphics

Creative team
- Created by: Linda Medley
- Written by: Linda Medley
- Artist: Linda Medley

Castle Waiting is a graphic novel series, created by Linda Medley, first published in 1996. It is set in a world of fairy tales and mythology featuring a mix of old-fashioned storytelling and more ironic, modern touches. The series brings together characters from several classic fairy tales, such as Simple Simon and Iron Henry, as well as referencing several others such as Jack and the Beanstalk and Sleeping Beauty. The story focuses on the daily lives of the characters, their interactions with one another, and their complicated pasts.

== Synopsis ==
The story begins with a stand-alone prologue tale, Castle Waiting: The Curse of Brambly Hedge, which retells the story of Sleeping Beauty mostly from the perspective of those at the periphery of the action. The book then picks up many years later, after the castle, long abandoned by Sleeping Beauty, has become a home for another group of fairytale characters, many of whom have rather troubled pasts. The castle's daily workings are now overseen by Rackham, a stork-headed dandy, and the place has become somewhat run-down and is beset by mischievous but generally friendly sprites and poltergeists. This story originally focused on Lady Jain, a pregnant woman fleeing her abusive husband. The series details backstories for some of the characters, such as elaborating on how the bearded nun Sister Peace arrived at the castle. Later chapters show Jain settling into the castle's keep with her baby with the help of some Hammerlings and the fellow residents of the castle.

== Publishing history ==
Medley initially self-published the series as a series of individual chapters beginning with The Curse of Brambly Hedge through Olio Press using a 1996 grant from the Xeric Foundation. She continued self-publishing, releasing eight issues until the series went on hiatus in 1999. The series was picked up by Jeff Smith's Cartoon Books the following year, after which Medley released four more chapters. The sales through Cartoon Books were disappointing and Medley returned to self-publishing in 2001. She released five more issues, bringing the total issues for the series to sixteen. Castle Waiting was again picked up by a publisher in 2006, Fantagraphics Books, who proceeded to release a hardcover collection of the first nineteen chapters. The 2010 release of Castle Waiting Vol. 2 did not include a credit to Linda Medley as creator on the cover or any interior pages. The only mention of her name was in the fine print of the copyright notice on the last page, and on a retro-actively affixed sticker on the back cover. The sticker read "FANTAGRAPHICS BOOKS \ STORY AND ART BY L. MEDLEY" and was placed over the "Fantagraphics Books" logo. Fantagraphics has stated that this was at Medley's request. This edition included 11 chapters and the story ended abruptly. In 2013, Fantagraphics Books released a "Definitive Edition" of volume 2 which included an additional 60 pages in 7 chapters and epilogue, to complete the volume. Fantagraphics stated in 2010 that Medley was currently taking a break from writing any additional chapters for the series.

=== Volumes ===
Title	ISBN	Release date	Collected material
Castle Waiting	ISBN 1-56097-747-7	May 31, 2006	Vol. 1 Chapters 1-19
Castle Waiting Vol. II	ISBN 1606994050	December 6, 2010	Vol. 2 Chapters 1-11
Castle Waiting Vol. II Definitive Edition	ISBN 1606996339	May 17, 2013	Vol. 2 Chapters 1-18

== Reception ==
Critical reception for the series has been positive, with Publishers Weekly naming Castle Waiting as one of the best comic books of 2006 in a critics' poll. Comic Book Resources praised the final chapter of the second volume for the series, stating that it was "both open ended enough so that Medley can do whatever she likes, but complete enough that it feels finished if need be".

== Awards ==
- Eisner Award for "Best Graphic Album - New" for The Curse of Brambly Hedge (1997)
- Eisner Award for "Best New Series" (1998)

== See also ==
- List of feminist comic books
- Portrayal of women in comics
