= Steady Beat =

2003 manga-inspired comic by Rivkah

- Genre: Yuri
- Author: Rivkah
- Illustrator: Rivkah
- Publisher: (United States) Tokyopop
- Demographic: Teen girls
- Original run: 2003

Steady Beat is an original English-language manga by Rivkah. It tells the story of Leah, a sixteen-year-old girl who finds a love letter addressed to her older sister Sarai, from a girl called Jessica. It tells of how Leah learns to accept her sister's homosexuality. Leah realises how lonely she has become and ends up falling in love with a Jewish boy who has two fathers, thus realising how difficult homosexuality can be to understand in society.

== Development ==
Steady Beat is set in Austin, Texas, where Rivkah grew up.

== Publication ==
In March 2003, Steady Beat was serialized on the internet by Wirepop.com. Rivkah submitted it to Tokyopop's Rising Stars of Manga competition. The first volume was published by Tokyopop in 2005. The second volume was released by Tokyopop in 2006. In June 2008 Rivkah announced that she had been told that Tokyopop would only publish the third volume of Steady Beat online, not as a paperback. The first and second volumes of Steady Beat went out of print in August 2009.

== Reception ==
IGN found the first book clichéd. Johanna Draper Carlson, while noting some cliches, praised Rivkah's artwork, especially in the details of the hair. She disliked how the characters broke the fourth wall during the early part of the second book, but enjoyed the setting of the work, which she felt was more evident in the second volume. Ain't It Cool News regards the work as "ambitious". PopCultureShock reviewed the first book and found the extra plotlines distracting.
