= Quicken Forbidden =

- Cover to Quicken Forbidden issue #3

Publication information
- Publisher: Cryptic Press
- Schedule: Irregular
- Format: Ongoing
- Publication date: 1997 – present?
- No. of issues: 13 as of 2006
- Main character: Jax Epoch

Creative team
- Created by: Dave Roman, John Green
- Written by: Dave Roman
- Artist: John Green
- Inker: Adam Dekraker

Quicken Forbidden was a comicbook title published by Cryptic Press, and created by writer Dave Roman and artist John Patrick Green (under the name John Green). It was first published in 1996, and the first five issues were later collected into a trade paperback; the series concluded with issue 13, published in 2005. AiT/Planet Lar collected the first ten issues in two trade paperbacks, Jax Epoch and the Quicken Forbidden: Borrowed Magic and Jax Epoch and the Quicken Forbidden: Separation Anxiety.

The plot revolves around Jax Epoch, a normal modern-day high school student from New York. Through a series of accidents and moments of poor judgement, she ends up accused of bringing items from a number of fantasy realms into the real world, and thus causing the fantasy realms and the real world to leak into one another, causing havoc and destruction for all realms involved. Most importantly, she is accused of releasing a creature called the Quicken, which must now be captured and contained.
