= Friends of Lulu =

American organization that promoted the participation of women in the comic book industry

- Friends of Lulu logo from 2004, illustrated by Diana X. Sprinkle
- Founded: 1994; 32 years ago
- Founders: Heidi MacDonald, Trina Robbins, Deni Loubert, Anina Bennett, Liz Schiller, Jackie Estrada
- Dissolved: 2011; 15 years ago
- Type: Nonprofit
- Purpose: To promote readership of comic books by women and the participation of women in the comic book industry.
- Region served: United States
- Product: Publications, Lulu Awards
- President: Valerie D'Orazio (2007–2010)
- Key people: Lee Marrs, Kim Yale Mary Wilshire
- Revenue: Membership dues; sales of publications
- Website: friendsoflulu.wordpress.com

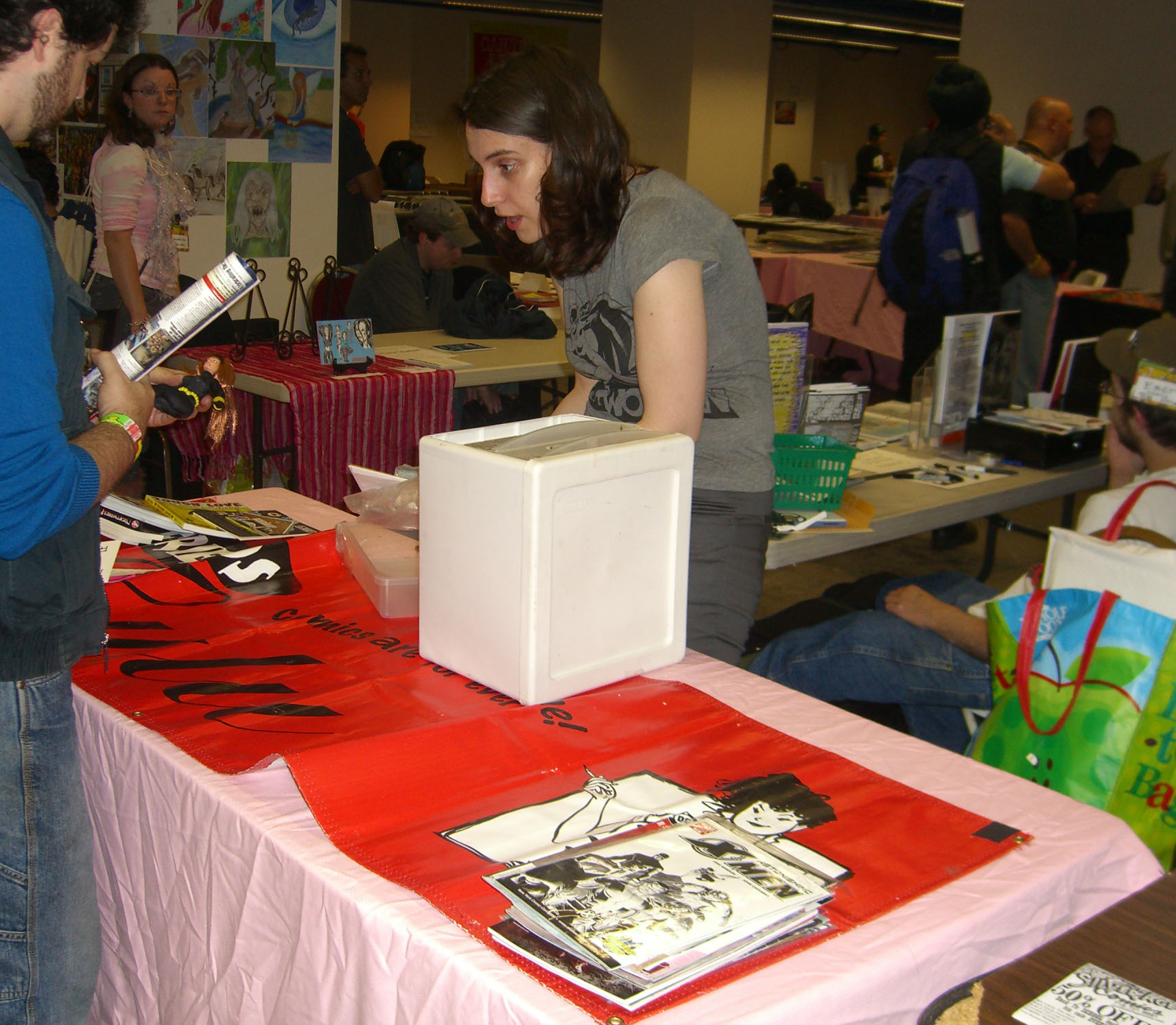
Friends of Lulu President Valerie D'Orazio at the Friends of Lulu table at the Big Apple Con, November 15, 2008

Friends of Lulu (FoL) was a non-profit, national charitable organization located in the United States, designed to promote readership of comic books by women and the participation of women in the comic book industry. FoL operated from 1994 to 2011.

Membership was open to all persons. Friends of Lulu additionally sponsored the Lulu Awards and administered the Women Cartoonists Hall of Fame.

The organization took its name from Little Lulu, the comic strip character created by Marjorie Henderson Buell in 1935. In the comics, Lulu often tries to break into the boys' clubhouse, where girls are not allowed.

== History ==
=== Formation ===
In the early 1990s, comic book professionals Trina Robbins, Heidi MacDonald, Deni Loubert, Anina Bennett, Liz Schiller, and Jackie Estrada banded together to share frustrations, information and aspirations for women in the male-dominated comics industry — at that point, there were roughly "20 women writing and drawing [professionally] amid hundreds of male counterparts...;" furthermore, "90% to 95% of comics readers [were] male."

The first informal Friends of Lulu meeting — a brunch at the 1993 edition of WonderCon, in Oakland, California — was attended by Robbins, MacDonald, Loubert, Bennett, Schiller, and Estrada. Friends of Lulu was officially formed in 1994; co-founder Trina Robbins recalls that a Cherry Poptart lookalike contest sponsored by Comic-Con International was the "last straw" that inspired the creation of the organization. FoL began as an amateur press association which lasted three issues. The Friends of Lulu logo was created by MacDonald.

=== Activities ===
As an organization, Friends of Lulu decided to address three main areas of concern: proving the case that girls and women did indeed read comics (and always had), the reluctance by the comics industry — publishers and retailers — to market comics to females, and the lack of work available to female comics creators.

FoL began tabling at San Diego Comic-Con and continued for many years at other comic book conventions. Activities included meeting with publishers, retailers, and creators, and conducting readership surveys. The organization also raised money through the sales of T-shirts, buttons, stickers, and, later on, their own publications. Artist Lee Marrs was a regular presence at the Friends of Lulu table at these events.

FoL elected its first board of directors in the summer of 1995 at San Diego Comic-Con. (The organization continued the tradition of electing board members during Comic-Con for many subsequent years.) The organization published a newsletter called Lulu's Clubhouse, which it distributed to members. Various FoL regional chapters were formed, some of which produced minicomics to promote Friends of Lulu.

In 1997 the first annual Friends of Lulu conference, titled "Here to Save Comics," was held in San Jose, California (in conjunction with the Alternative Press Expo); the Lulu Awards were presented at that year's San Diego Comic-Con.

1997 also saw the publication of How to Get Girls (Into Your Store), a guide for comics shop retailers on how to make their stores more female-friendly. The guide was edited by Deni Loubert. Diamond Comics Distribution helped get the guide into stores, also providing free full-page ads for the guide in Diamond's retailer catalog.

The organization held two more "LuluCon" conferences, in 1998 in Newark, New Jersey, and in 1999 in Los Angeles.

In 2000, Friends of Lulu was awarded a grant from the Xeric Foundation to self-publish Friends of Lulu: Storytime.

In 2003, the organization published an anthology entitled Broad Appeal.

=== Troubles and dissolution ===
In the spring of 2006, in the wake of revelations of a sexual assault that happened at a 2005 comic convention, FoL vice president Ronée Garcia Bourgeois announced the creation of a Friends of Lulu Women's Empowerment Fund. The fund was "intended to give victims of sexual assault or harassment in a comics-industry context the strength to fight back legally if not physically." However, the empowerment fund "was judged by its administrators to have been insufficiently thought through ... and it was soon abandoned," with FoL forced to return all donations.

The public failure of the Empowerment Fund was difficult for Friends of Lulu, and by the fall of 2007, the presidency of the organization was vacant. In September 2007, Valerie D'Orazio volunteered to fill the empty president of the national board of directors of Friends of Lulu.

By the summer of 2010, FoL's future was uncertain, with D'Orazio announcing she planned to step down as president at the end of the year. In August 2010, an interim Board of Directors was reestablished.

In June 2011, the IRS revoked the organization's tax-exempt status as a non-profit "for failing to file an annual information return or notice with the IRS for three consecutive years." The group ceased operations shortly afterwards.

== Legacy ==
With the dissolution of Friends of Lulu, observers weighed in on the organization's legacy:

...today’s younger female creators don’t see the problems FoL was created in response to (in part due to FoL’s actions) and thus don’t see much of a need for the group. These creators have more avenues available to them — webcomics, book publisher graphic novel contracts, online organization and support — and a formal group may seem old-fashioned.

— Johanna Draper Carlson

Heidi MacDonald added:

...the world that FoL was created to confront doesn't exist anymore. Women are back in comics as creators, readers, retailers... you name it.... The ’90s were a period when women had been driven out of the medium, for the most part....

In 2019, a commemorative panel on Friends of Lulu was held at the 50th San Diego Comic-Con, with Jackie Estrada, Heidi MacDonald, Lee Marrs, Liz Schiller, Trina Robbins, and Anina Bennett serving on the panel, which was moderated by Alexa Dickman of Ladies Making Comics.

== Presidents ==
- 1995–1997 Jackie Estrada
- 1997–1998 Laurel Carpenter
- 1998–2000 Jackie Estrada
- 2000–2001 Liz Schiller
- 2001–2002 Katie Merritt (owner of retail store Green Brain Comics)
- c. 2005 Tasha Lowe
- 2006 Katie Merritt
- 2007 Shannon Crane
- 2007–2010 Valerie D'Orazio

== Lulu Awards ==
The Lulu Awards, presented annually at San Diego Comic-Con (1997 to 2007), MoCCA Festival in New York City (2008 to 2009), and the Long Beach Comic Con in Long Beach, New York (2010) bestowed the Lulu of the Year trophy for overall work; with additional awards, variously over the years, including the Kimberly Yale Award for Best New Talent; the Volunteer of the Year Award; the Women of Distinction Award; the Leah Adezio Award for Best Kid-Friendly Work; Best Female Character; and induction into the Women Cartoonists Hall of Fame.

== Publications ==
Friends of Lulu produced a number of publications, including:

- How to Get Girls (Into Your Store) (1997)
- Friends of Lulu Presents: Storytime (2001), compiled and edited by Anne Chang-Blaeske and Phil Yeh
- Broad Appeal: An Anthology of Comics for Everyone (2003) — anthology of comics by women artists, edited by Dave Roman
- The Girls' Guide to Guys' Stuff (2007) — anthology of over 50 women cartoonists including Roberta Gregory, Abby Denson, and Julia Wertz, edited by Robin Enrico and M. K. Reed.

== Conferences ==
Friends of Lulu held three "LuluCons" in 1997–1999. The events featured panels, workshops, and networking opportunities.

- 1997 (Feb. 2) "Here to Save Comics" (Hyatt Sainte Claire, San Jose, California) — produced by Friends of Lulu NorCal; held in conjunction with the Alternative Press Expo
- 1998 (June 13–14) LuluCon II: "Comics: Reaching Out for the Future" (Marriott Hotel, Newark Airport, Newark, New Jersey)
- 1999 (May 1–2) LuluCon III: "Comics are Books, Too!" (Miyako Inn and Spa, Los Angeles, California) — sponsors included Bongo Comics, Cold Cut Distribution, Dark Horse Comics, Diamond Comic Distributors, Firecracker Alternative Book Awards, GraphicNovels.com, Hysteria Publications, Last Gasp of San Francisco, NBM Publishing, Bud Plant Comics Art, Slave Labor Graphics, and WaRP Graphics.

== See also ==
- List of Lulu Award winners
- Sequential Tart
- Female comics creators
- List of female comics creators
- List of feminist comic books
- Portrayal of women in American comics
